= Buddhi Vardhak Granth =

19th-century reformist journal in British India

- Type: Monthly journal
- Format: Journal
- Publisher: Buddhi Vardhak Hindu Sabha
- Editor: Narmad (initially)
- Founded: 1851; 175 years ago
- Ceased publication: Unknown
- Political alignment: Social reformism
- Language: Gujarati
- Headquarters: Bombay, Bombay Presidency, British Raj
- Country: British Raj

Buddhi Vardhak Granth (lit. 'Book for the Advancement of Knowledge') (Note: Likely also referred to as "Gnan Vardhak" in academic literature) was a 19th-century Gujarati journal published from Bombay (now Mumbai) during British Raj in India. It was the official publication of the Buddhi Vardhak Sabha, a social reform organisation, and served as a platform for advocating social change.

== History ==
The Buddhi Vardhak Sabha was founded in Bombay in 1851 by young, educated members of the Jnayan Prasarak Mandali, a branch of the Students' Literary and Scientific Society of Elphinstone College. The founders included notable figures like Narmad, Karsandas Mulji, Pranlal Mathurdas, and Mohanlal Ranchhoddas Jhaveri. The Sabha's primary objective was to promote the social welfare of the Gujarati Hindu community and to challenge religious orthodoxy and harmful social customs through lectures, debates, and writings.

The Sabha launched a monthly journal, the Buddhi Vardhak Granth, in 1851 to disseminate its ideas, and Narmad assumed the role of its first editor. The publication had an intermittent start, with its first three issues appearing between 1851 and 1853, before beginning regular publication from March 1856.

== Content and ideology ==
The articles published in Buddhi Vardhak Granth dealt primarily with social issues. As a vehicle for the Sabha's reformist agenda, its content focused on advocating for female education, supporting widow remarriage, and mounting critiques against religious superstition and the entrenched power of traditionalist religious leaders.

The journal was one of the few reformist publications in Bombay that included the Parsi-run Rast Goftar and Karsondas Mulji's influential paper Satyaprakash. These papers collectively advocated for social change within Hindu society and often included essays on scientific subjects and critiques of traditional customs, aiming to awaken public opinion.

The paper's advocacy centered on what the reformers considered the key social issues of the time, particularly those affecting women. The journal was instrumental in the public debates surrounding events like the Maharaj Libel Case of 1862, in which the journal's key figures, Narmad and Karsondas Mulji, were deeply involved.

== See also ==
- Media in Gujarati language
- List of Gujarati-language magazines
- Satyaprakash
- Rast Goftar
