= Media in Gujarati language =

Part of a series on

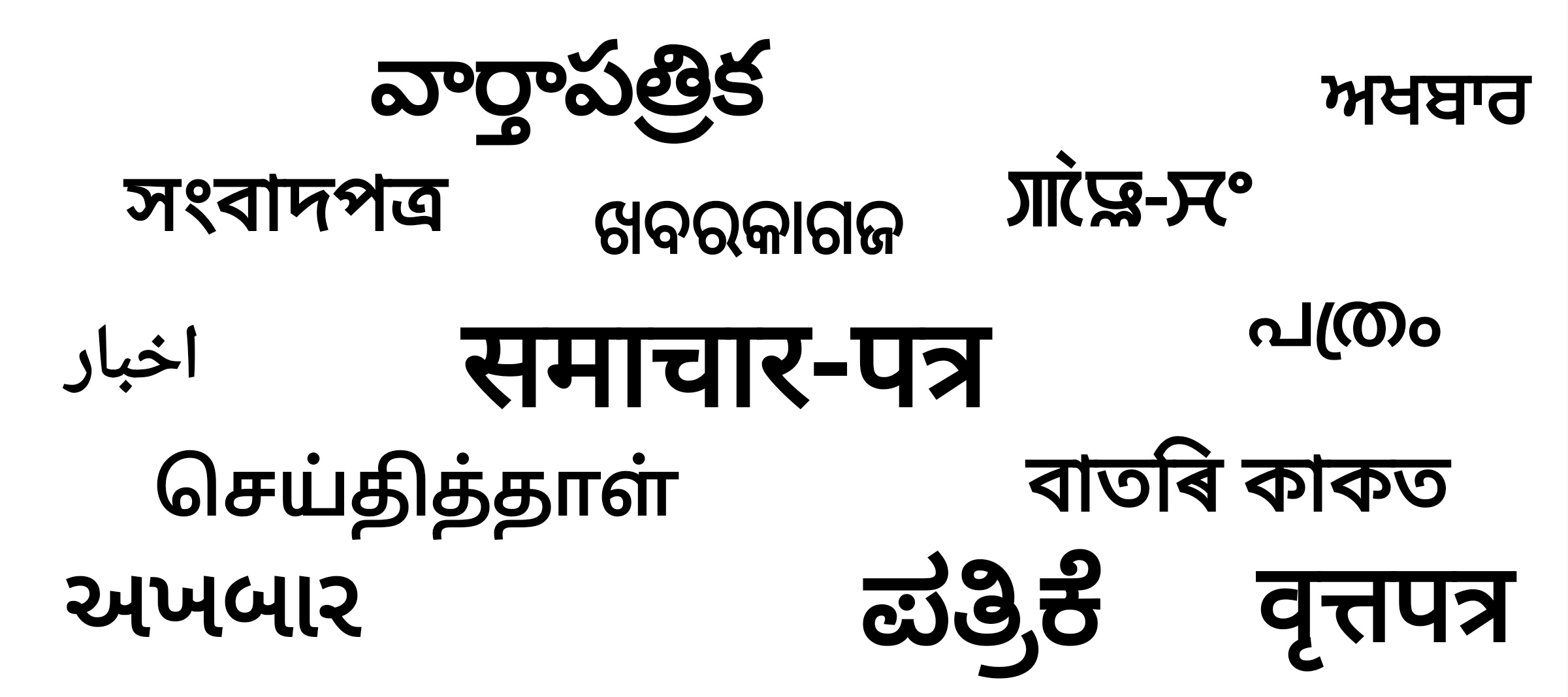

Newspapers of India
Category
Newspapers by languages
- Assamese
- Bengali
- Gujarati
- Hindi
- Kannada
- Malayalam
- Marathi
- Meitei (Manipuri)
- Punjabi
- Tamil
- Telugu
Related
- Newspapers by readership
- Registrar of Newspapers for India
- The Indian Newspaper Society

The Media in Gujarati language started with publication of Bombay Samachar in 1822. Initially, the newspapers published business news and they were owned by Parsi people based in Bombay. Later Gujarati newspapers started published from other parts of Gujarat. Several periodicals devoted to social reforms were published in the second half of the 19th century. After the arrival of Mahatma Gandhi, the Indian independence movement peaked and it resulted in the proliferation of Gujarati media. Following independence, the media was chiefly focused on political news. After the bifurcation of Bombay state, the area of service changed. Later, there was an increase in readership due to the growth of literacy and the media houses expanded their readership by publishing more editions. Later, these media houses ventured into digital media also. The radio and television media expanded after 1990.

== Print media ==
=== History ===
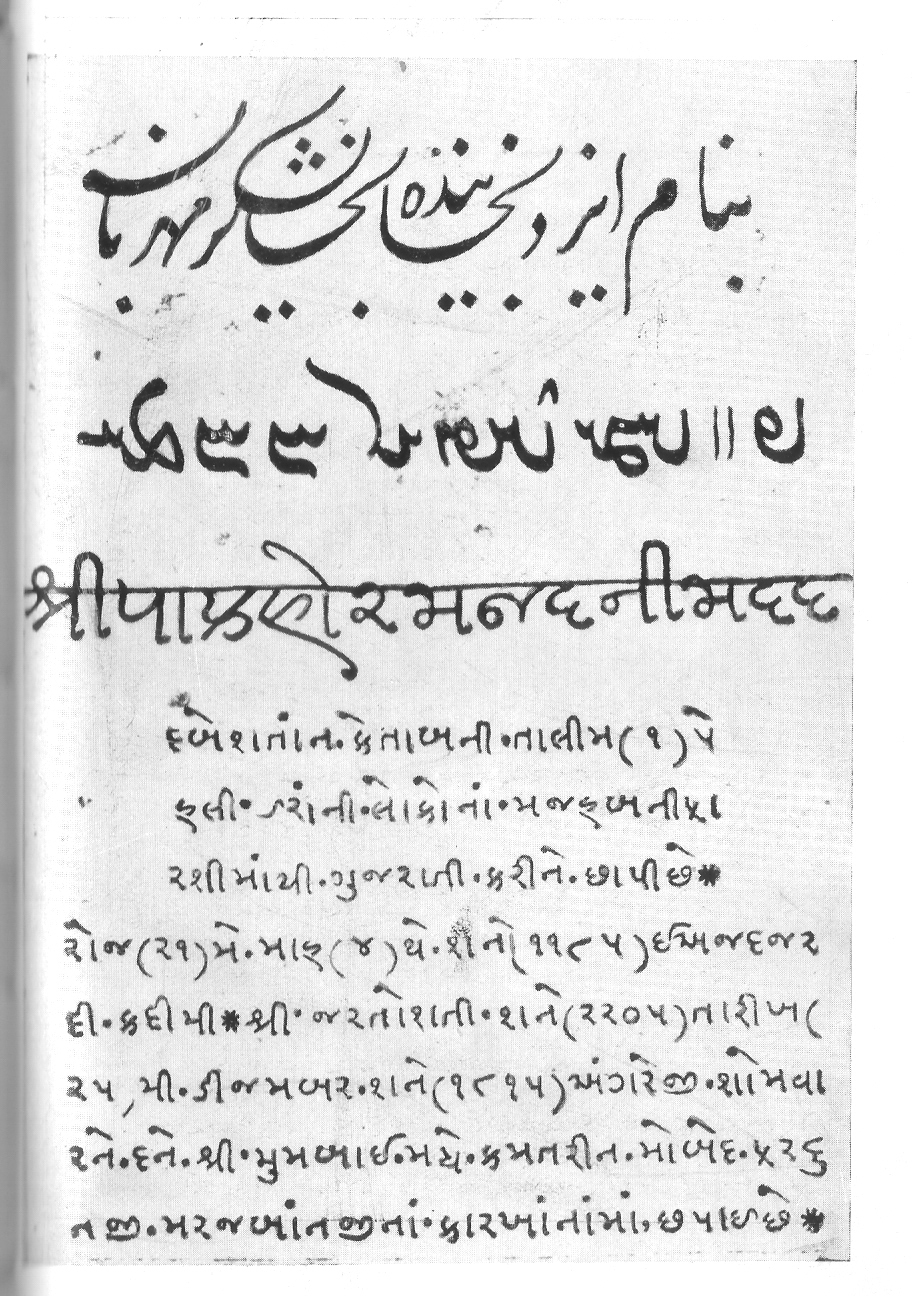
A Page from the Gujarati translation of 'Dabestan-e Mazaheb' prepared and printed by Fardunji Marzban (25 December 1815)

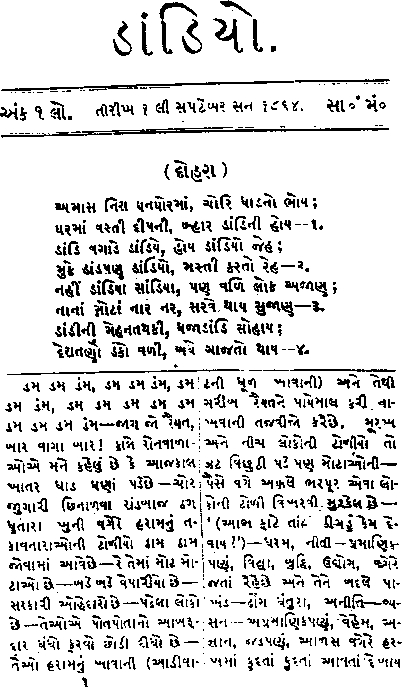
Daandiyo, dated 1 September 1864 (first issue)

==== 1822—1915 ====
The printing was introduced in Gujarati in 1812. The first printed book published was the Gujarati translation of Dabestan-e Mazaheb prepared and printed by Parsi priest Fardunjee Marzban in 1815. Early newspapers in Gujarati were published from Bombay, and they covered commercial and business news chiefly. They were mainly published by Parsi community and served the area of Bombay (now Mumbai). On 1 July 1822, the first Gujarati newspaper Bombayna Samachar was started by Fardunjee Marzban as a weekly business journal with 150 subscribers. In 1832, it was renamed Bombay Samachar and converted into a biweekly. Later, it became daily in 1855. In 1933, its present publisher, the Cama family, bought it. Another Parsi, Naoroji Dorabji Chandaru, started Mumbai Vartman in 1830. A year later was renamed Mumbaina Halkaru Ane Vartaman and converted into a biweekly publication, which was published until 1843. Pestonji Manekji started a weekly Jam-e-Jamshed in 1831, which was later converted into a daily in 1853. Several other newspapers published between 1832 and 1856: Doorbeen, Samachar Darpan, Mombaina Kasud, Chitranjan Darpan and Chabuk. The first women's magazine in Gujarati, Stribodh was established in 1857 by Parsi social activists.

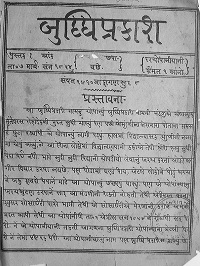
Buddhiprakash, Gujarati periodical, 1850

Vartaman, Gujarati newspaper, 1849

The Gujarat Vernacular Society of Ahmedabad, founded by British Magistrate Alexander Kinloch Forbes, started Vartaman in 1849. The society also published Budhvar weekly and Buddhiprakash magazine. Due to the efforts of Forbes, Surat Samachar, a biweekly, was introduced in Surat in 1850, which ran for a short period. Dinshaw Ardeshir Talyarkhan started Gujarat Darpan in 1863 as a biweekly. It was merged with Gujaratmitra in 1894 and was renamed Gujaratmitra Gujarat Darpan.

Several journals during those times were dedicated to social reform. Parhejhgar of Surat was devoted to prohibition. Lallubhai Raichand launched Shamasher Bahadur in Ahmedabad in 1854. Social reformer Dadabhai Navroji introduced Rast Goftar (The Truth Teller) to clarify Zoroastrian concepts in 1854, which was published until 1921. Narmad launched Dandiyo in 1864 which was inspired by The Spectator. It ran until 1869 and merged with Sunday Review in 1870. Karsandas Mulji started Satyaprakash in 1855 in Bombay.

The first daily published in Gujarat was Hitechchhu. It was launched biweekly in 1861 and later became daily in 1873. Prajabandhu was introduced in 1895. A weekly from Kheda, Kheda Vartman was started in 1861 and completed its centenary. An evening newspaper Sanj Varman of Bombay was introduced in 1902 and published until 1950. Doot, a Gujarati Catholic monthly, was launched from Bombay.

==== 1915—1960 ====
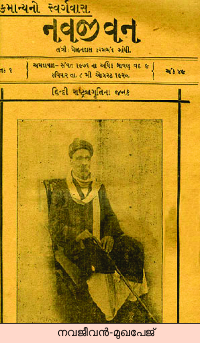
Navjivan dated 8 August 1920 covering death of Lokmanya Tilak

Gujarati journalism was greatly influenced by the Indian independence movement between 1915 and 1947. Mahatma Gandhi who led the independence movement, introduced Navjivan in 1919. It was renamed Harijan Bandhu in 1932 and published until 1940. It was revived and published again from 1946 to 1948. Saurashtra weekly was started in 1921 which was renamed later as Phulchhab. Hajimahamad Allarakha published artistic periodical Visami Sadi from 1916 to 1920.

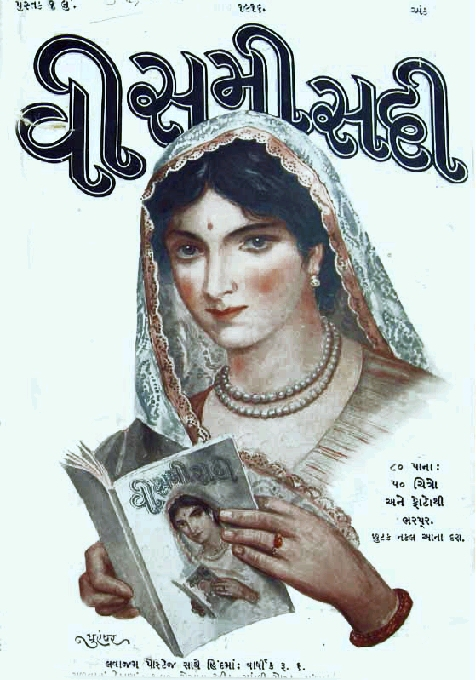
Cover of 1916 issue of Visami Sadi. Cover Art by M. V. Dhurandhar. Edited by Hajimahamad Allarakha.

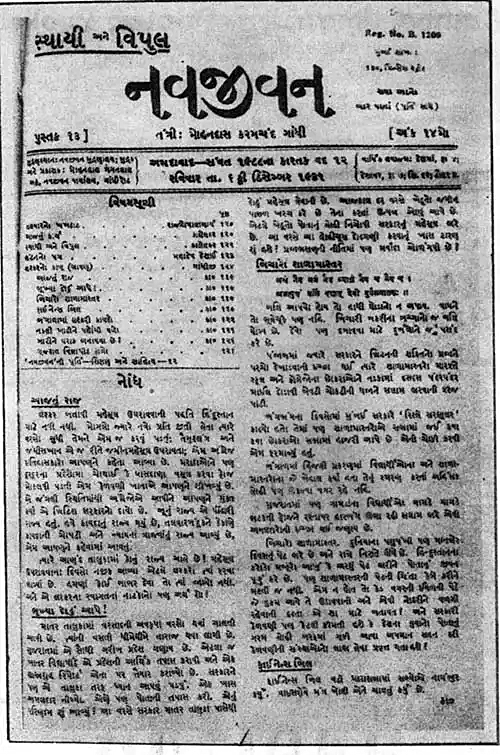
Page of Navjivan dated 6 December 1931

Sandesh was founded by Nandlal Bodiwala in 1923 following Non-cooperation movement. Gujarat Samachar was started in 1932 following Dandi March and civil disobedience movement. Amritlal Seth founded Saurashtra Trust in 1931 and launched Janmabhoomi on 9 June 1934 in Bombay. It was edited by Samaldas Gandhi. After sometime, Samaldas Gandhi left Janmabhoomi and launched Vande Mataram. Following a business war between two newspapers, Amritlal Seth founded the Indian Languages Newspapers Association. He also founded a cooperative society to finance other newspapers. It expanded its reach by publishing and acquiring several magazines and newspapers. It owns Vyapar (1948), the first business magazine in an Indian language, founded in 1948, Phulchhab (1921) publishing from Rajkot and Kutchmitra (1955) publishing from Bhuj. It also owns a weekly, Pravasi and a literary journal Kavita. Jai Hind was founded by Babulal Shah in 1948 which is headquartered at Rajkot. Loksatta—Jansatta was founded in 1953. The Prabhat was founded in 1934 by Kakalbhai Kothari after leaving Phulchhab. He was the driving force of Phulchaab around the years 1932 and later edited the weekly 'Navsaurashtra', a part of the Prabhat Group of Newspapers

==== 1960—2000 ====
Following Mahagujarat Movement in 1960, Bombay state was divided into Gujarat, with Ahmedabad as its capital, and Maharashtra with Mumbai as its capital. The newspapers published from both capital cities changed their area of coverage accordingly. Akila Daily started in 1978 from Rajkot. Gujarat Samachar and Sandesh expanded its number of editions in 1980s. Sandesh was headed by Chimanbhai Patel from 1958, who introduced weekly supplements in Gujarat. Pradyumna Mehta published the monthly Hindustan Patrika in Chicago from 1977 to 1981 for the Gujarati diaspora. Other monthlies abroad were Gujarat Vartaman and Bharat Sandesh, both based in Chicago and stopped in the 1980s. Gujarati Samachar based in New York City was published also. Bhupat Vadodaria established Sambhaav media group in 1986 which publishes evening tabloid Sambhaav Metro in Ahmedabad. It also publishes Abhiyaan, a socio-political weekly. Among the notable Gujarati periodicals published from Mumbai during this period was Samkaleen, a Gujarati daily of the Express Group founded by Ramnath Goenka. Under the editorship of Hasmukh Gandhi, it gained recognition for its coverage of politics, public affairs, and analytical editorial writing and occupied a significant place in late twentieth century Gujarati journalism. Gandhi edited it between January 1984 and February 1995.

==== 2000 onwards ====
Sambhaav was the first media group to enter online media in Gujarat. Divya Bhaskar was introduced in 2003 by Dainik Bhaskar Group which led to another business war in Gujarati print media. It quickly expanded across Gujarat and took over Saurashtra Samachar based in Bhavnagar in 2004. Divya Bhaskar publishes an edition for the Gujarati diaspora in North America. The Times Group which publishes The Times of India, launched Gujarati edition of The Economic Times in February 2007 in Ahmedabad and its Gujarati daily NavGujarat Samay in January 2014.

== Digital media ==
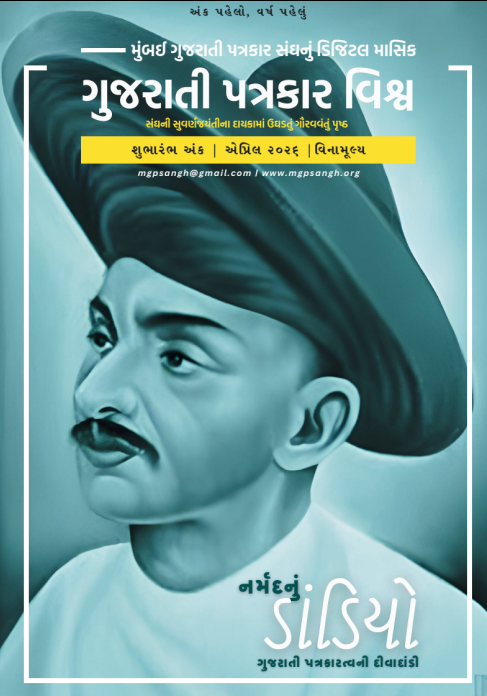

Gujarat was the first state in India where the rural high-frequency television transmitter was established. In 1975, it was established at Pij, Kheda district. The state-owned Doordarshan was the first to enter television, and it operates DD Girnar. Other privately operated TV channels are Colors Gujarati, P7 News, Dainik Gujarat, Gujarat First News, TV 9 Gujarati, Bizz News, VTV Gujarati, Sandesh News, GSTV News, ABP Asmita, PTN News, Live Gujarati News, Gujarati Jagran. In April 2026, the Mumbai Gujarati Patrakar Sangh, an association of Gujarati journalists in Mumbai established in 1973, launched Gujarati Patrakar Vishwa, a monthly digital magazine serving as its official publication.

== Radio ==
The first radio station in Gujarat was founded by Sayajirao Gaekwad III of Baroda State in 1939. Later, it was merged with All India Radio in 1948 after independence of India. In 2011, there were 10 radio stations in Gujarat run by All India Radio, including Vividhbharti. There were several other radio channels owned by private media groups in Gujarat, including Radio Mirchi, Radio City, Red FM, My FM, Radio One, Big FM and Top FM. There are four campus radio stations in Gujarat, Micavaani by MCA, GURU by Gujarat University, Vallabh Vidyanagar Campus radio and a campus radio by Sardar Patel University, Anand. SEWA operates the community radio, Rudi no Radio in Sanand near Ahmedabad.

== Statistics ==
In 1984, there were 735 publications in Gujarati including 43 dailies. It grew to 3005 publications in 2007—2008 as per Registrar of Newspapers for India, including 220 dailies and 1410 weeklies. They further grew to 4836 registered publications in 2014-2015, which include 539 dailies, 19 bi/triweeklies, 2189 weeklies, 548 fortnightly, 1324 monthlies, 105 quarterlies, 17 annuals and 95 others as per Registrar of Newspapers for India. According to the Indian Readership Survey 2013, the top three Gujarati dailies were Gujarat Samachar (4339000 readers), Divya Bhaskar (3770000), Sandesh (3724000).

As per 2011, there were more than 4 million television connections in Gujarat.

== See also ==
- Gujarati literature
- Gujarati language
- List of Gujarati-language writers
- List of Gujarati-language magazines
- Media of India
