= Gokuldas =

Gokuldas may refer to:

== People ==
- Gokuldas Malpani (1839–1909), Marwari millionaire
- Gokuldas Tejpal (1822–1867), Indian merchant
- A. V. Gokuldas, Indian production designer
- Meena Gokuldas, Indian voice actress

== Other uses ==
- Gokuldas Tejpal Hospital, hospital in India
