= Meghani =

Meghani (Gujarati: મેઘાણી) is a Gujarati surname. It is judged by the Oxford Dictionary of Family Names in Britain and Ireland 'probably' to originate in the Sanskrit word मेघ (megha). The name Megha is glossed by the Penguin Book of Hindu Names for Boys as 'sprinkler', 'cloud, mass', the name of a mythical rakshasa, and 'the father of the 5th Arhat of the present Avasarpinī'. In the surname Meghani, Megha is combined with the adjectival suffix -ani, ostensibly implying a name meaning 'to do with cloud' but, since Megha can also be a personal name, more likely meaning 'descended from Megha'. The Oxford Dictionary identifies the name as a Hindu one, and notes that 'this name is also found among people from Sind, Pakistan, who have migrated into India'. The name is associated with the Lohana and shia Nizari Isma'ilism muslim (agakhani)caste. As of about 2016, 219 people bore the name in Great Britain and none in Ireland.

== People ==
Notable people with the name include:

- Jayant Meghani (1938–2020), Indian editor and translator from Gujarat
- Jhaverchand Meghani (1896–1947), Indian poet, writer, social reformer and freedom fighter from Gujarat
- Fez Meghani (1976–), Pakistani-American music producer, composer, songwriter, singer, and performer (ismaili)
