= Tejpal =

Tejpal is a given name and surname. People with the name include:

- Gokuldas Tejpal (merchant and philanthropist)
- Tarun Tejpal (journalist)
- Tejpal Singh (politician)
- Tejpal Singh Nagar (politician)
- Tejpal Tawar (politician)

== See also ==
- Gokuldas Tejpal Hospital
- Tehelka#Sexual assault case against Tejpal
