= Hasmukh Gandhi =

Indian journalist (1932–1999)

Hasmukh Chimanlal Gandhi (19 February 1932 – 26 January 1999) was an Indian journalist, editor, and educator who worked in Gujarati journalism. He served in editorial positions across Gujarati publications, including Janmabhoomi, Janshakti, and Samkaleen.

== Early life and education ==
Hasmukh Gandhi was born on 19 February 1932 in a small temple in the city of Vadodara, Gujarat. Because his father, Chimanlal Gandhi, was a government school teacher, the family faced frequent transfers. Consequently, Gandhi received his primary and secondary education across multiple towns, including Dahegam, Padra, Dhandhuka, Gangadhara (near Bardoli), and Kheralu in the Mehsana district.

He spent his adolescence in Bhavnagar before moving to Mumbai for higher education. He attended Ramnarain Ruia College in Mumbai, graduating in 1955 with a Master of Arts (MA) degree in Gujarati (Second Class). Although he initially aspired to become a college lecturer, circumstances led him to begin his professional career as a high school teacher.

== Career ==
=== Teaching ===
Gandhi spent six years working as a teacher in various schools, including the Ramji Ashar School in Ghatkopar, Mumbai.

=== Journalism ===
In 1958, Gandhi transitioned to journalism by joining Janmabhoomi, a prominent evening daily published by the Saurashtra Trust. He worked there until 1972. During this tenure, the management sent him to Surat to work for Pratap, another daily under the same trust, between 1968 and 1969, before he returned to Mumbai.

In 1972, the Express Group planned to launch a Mumbai edition of the Ahmedabad-based daily Loksatta, appointing Gandhi as its Resident Editor. However, the edition failed to launch, leading to a brief period of unemployment.

Following this, he worked for eight months as an assistant editor at the Parichay Trust, and later joined the daily Janashakti as an assistant editor. After Janashakti ceased operations, he returned to the Saurashtra Trust, serving as the assistant editor for Janmabhoomi Pravasi from 1979 to 1983.

==== The Samkaleen Era (1984–1995) ====
His most influential phase came when he took charge of Samkaleen, a publication launched by the Indian Express Group on 14 January 1984. Under his leadership, Samkaleen rewrote the rules of Gujarati journalism, setting entirely new benchmarks for the industry. Gandhi possessed an extraordinary command over Gujarati and English, a deep understanding of Hindi and Marathi, and an exceptional mastery of grammar.

Under his supervision, the newspaper gained immense popularity for its impeccable content, highly appealing headings, innovative presentation of news and feature articles, and a contemporary layout never seen before in the Gujarati press. The daily became so widely sought after that it was read extensively across various parts of Gujarat and India, with readers eagerly purchasing copies even when they arrived two or three days after publication. Between 1984 and 1995, Samkaleen stood as India's most talked-about Gujarati newspaper.

Alkesh Patel mentioned on Gujarati Vishwakosh about Samkaleen, "Through 'Samkaleen', Gujarati journalism received a new direction, generating significant interest among journalists, scholars, politicians, and general readers alike. During that period, it also came to be known as an 'editors' paper'."

In addition to writing under his own name, Hasmukh Gandhi wrote under several pen names, the best known of which was Trun Talati.

==== Later career ====
Gandhi left Samkaleen in February 1995. Following his departure, he briefly worked with the Abhiyan Group, where he contributed extensively to their evening Gujarati newspaper, Samantar Pravah. Later in his career, he wrote columns for the Mid-Day Group's publication, Gujarati Mid-Day.

== Death and legacy ==
Gandhi died on 26 January 1999 at the age of 66 at a hospital in Vile Parle, Mumbai.

A compilation of his select editorials and articles, titled Mara Mangamta Tantrilekho, was later published by Divyang Shukla.
