= Doot (disambiguation) =

Jan de Doot is the subject of a painting by Carel van Savoyen.

Doot may also refer to:

- Doot (magazine), Gujarati Catholic monthly published from Gujarat, India

== See also ==
- Doot-Doot, a 1983 album by Freur
- "Doot Doot (6 7)", a 2025 song by rapper Skrilla
- Doot Doot Garden, a mini-comics series by Craig Thompson
