= Varghese Paul =

Indian Jesuit priest and author (1943–2021)

- Born: Varghese Paul Chollamadam; 31 May 1943; Enanalloor, Travancore, British India (now in Kerala, India)
- Died: 10 April 2021 (aged 77); Vadodara, Gujarat, India
- Occupation: Writer
- Writing career
- Language: Gujarati, English, Malayalam

Father Varghese Paul Chollamadam (31 May 1943 – 10 April 2021) was a writer, journalist, translator and Jesuit priest from Gujarat, India. Born in South India, he was ordained a priest in 1977. He had written 53 essay books and edited a Catholic magazine Doot for 14 years. He had served on various posts in several press organisations including some which he had founded.

== Biography ==
Father Varghese Paul was born on 31 May 1943 in Enanalloor, a village now in Ernakulam district of Kerala, India. He joined Jesuits of Gujarat on 8 June 1964. He studied theology at Pontifical Gregorian University in Rome, Italy. He was ordained a priest at Church of the Gesù in Rome on 21 June 1977. He graduated in Gujarati literature. He studied journalism in London School of Journalism.

He had served as the president of Gujarati Lekhak Mandal. He also served on the Executive Committee of Guild of Indian English Writers, Editors and Critics.

He edited Gujarati Catholic magazine Doot for 14 years. He was a member of Indian Catholic Press Association and International Catholic Union of the Press. He founded South Asia Religious News in 1981 and served as its director. He was also the founder of Gujarat Catholic Press Association and Catholic Information Service Society (CISS) where he served as the director from 1984 to 2018.

He died in Vadodara on 10 April 2021 following prolonged illness and COVID-19.

== Works ==
Father Varghese primarily wrote in Gujarati. He had written 46 essay books in Gujarati, four in English and three in Malayalam.

He translated Perumbadavam Sreedharan's Malayalam novel Oru Sankeerthanam Pole into Gujarati as Ek Strotgan Ni Jem (2003). He also translated Winged Reason by K. V. Dominic from English to Gujarati.

His works on Christianity include Isu Mari-Tamari Najare (What Does Jesus Mean to You and Me?), Biblena Patro (Personalities of the Bible, 2003) and the Navo Karar Biblena Patro (Personalities of the New Testament, 2012).

== See also ==
- List of Gujarati-language writers
