= Buddhi Vardhak Sabha =

The Buddhi Vardhak Sabha (Society for Advancement of Knowledge), also known as the Buddhi Vardhak Hindu Sabha, was a socio-religious reform organization in Bombay (now Mumbai), in British India. It was founded in 1851 by the members of another Bombay reform association, the Jnayan Prasarak Mandali, whose members included Narmadashankar Dave (Narmad) and his fellow writers. The Jnayan Prasarak Mandali was a branch of the Students' Literary and Scientific Society of the Elphinstone Institution (now Elphinstone College).

The aim and object of the Buddhi Vardhak Sabha was to work for the social welfare of the Gujarati Hindu people, and to awaken public opinion for social change through lectures, debates and writings. Other founding members included Pranlal Mathurdas, Mohanlal Ranchhoddas Jhaveri, Karsandas Mulji, and Dalpatram.

== History ==
Bombay's Elphinstone Institution played an instrumental role in providing an intellectual background for the reform movements in Western India. In June 1848, its students started the Students' Literary and Scientific Society. In September 1848, two other branches of this society were established, one Gujarati, and the other Marathi. The Gujarati branch was known as Jnayan Prasarak Mandali (Society for Promotion of Knowledge), and was presided by Ranchhoddas Girdharbhai Jhaveri. Most of the members of this Mandali were Parsi students.

In 1850, the young Hindu members of the Jnayan Prasarak Mandali felt that a special organization was necessary to devote more attention to Hindu welfare. Accordingly, in June 1850, Narmad, with friends including Mayaram Shambhunath, Kalyanji Shivlal, and Narandas Kalyandas, founded the Juvan Purushoni Anyonya Buddhi Vardhak Sabha with the aim of furthering Hindu discussion of reforms. Narmad was its president.

On 23 March 1851, the decision was made to broaden the society's focus, and change its name to Buddhi Vardhak Hindu Sabha. The first meeting was held that same day, and rules adopted. Pranlal Mathurdas was appointed as the first president of the Buddhi Vardhak Hindu Sabha, with Mohanlal Ranchhoddas Jhaveri and Kishorlal respectively as secretary and treasurer. 70 members enrolled at the inaugural meeting, for a fee of Rs. 2 per month. According to the Sabha's rules, membership was restricted to Hindu people. Others, however, were invited to take part in the discussion.

Over the next 20 years, the Buddhi Vardhak Hindu Sabha and its members played an important role in the social reform movements of Bombay city and other cities of Gujarat. The Sabha's status began to decline after 1876, with the gradual demise of its founders.

== Publication ==
In 1851, the Buddhi Vardhak Sabha began publication of a monthly journal, Buddhi Vardhak Granth, of which Narmad assumed the editorship. The first issue was published in 1851, the second and third issues appearing in 1953. Regular publication began from March 1856. Articles published dealt mainly with social issues.

== Activities ==
The main object of the Buddhi Vardhak Sabha was to awaken the social consciousness of Hindu people through debate, talks and writings. Prominent speakers were to be invited, and each meeting devoted to the discussion of a particular problem and consideration of how to solve it.

In May 1851, the Sabha's members started Bombay's first schools for Hindu girls, one in the Fort area, and another near Bhuleshwar. Members of the Sabha, and students of the Elphinstone Institution, volunteered to teach in these girls' schools. The Buddhi Vardhak Sabha offered prizes for the best essays written on topics of social importance.

The Buddhi Vardhak Sabha's activities were supported by wealthy Gujarati patrons, including Sheth Mangaldas Nathubhai, Laxmidas Khimji, and Gokuldas Tejpal, and by Maharashtrian reformers like Dadoba Pandurang, Atmaram Pandurang, and Bhau Daji.
