= Matthew Richard Sausse =

1st Chief Justice of Bombay High Court

Sir Matthew Richard Sausse

1st Chief Justice of Bombay High Court
- In office 14 August 1862 – 27 April 1866
- Appointed by: Queen Victoria
- Preceded by: Position established
- Succeeded by: Richard Couch

Chief Justice of Supreme Court of Bombay
- In office 1859 – 13 August 1862
- Appointed by: Queen Victoria
- Preceded by: William Yardley
- Succeeded by: Position abolished

Judge of Supreme Court of Bombay
- In office 1856–1859
- Appointed by: Queen Victoria

Personal details
- Born: 1809 Carrick-on-Suir, County Tipperary
- Died: 5 November 1867 (aged 57–58) Killarney House
- Occupation: Lawyer, Judge
- Profession: Chief Justice

Sir Matthew Richard Sausse or Sause (1809 – 5 November 1867) was an Irish barrister and colonial judge whose career culminated in his becoming the last Chief Justice of the Supreme Court of Bombay and the first Chief Justice of the Bombay High Court.

== Early life and family ==
Sausse was born in 1809 at Carrick-on-Suir, County Tipperary, Ireland, into a Roman Catholic family. He was the son of Richard Sausse and Jane Duffey. His brother Sir Richard Frederick (known in Spanish as Ricardo Federico de La Saussaye y Duffey) was governor of Cartagena, Spain, who later achieved distinction in military and public life and is referred to in contemporary probate material as the executor of Matthew Sausse's estate. A contemporary report concerning the administration of Sausse's estate after his death records that his will was proved by his brother, General Sir Richard de la Saussaye, described as the sole executor and residuary legatee.

== Education and legal training ==
Sausse graduated with distinction from Trinity College, Dublin. His education at Trinity preceded his entry into the legal profession at a time when the Irish Bar remained one of the principal professional routes through which Irish lawyers could enter judicial and administrative service throughout the British Empire.

He was called to the Irish Bar in 1829. Twenty years later, in 1849, he attained the rank of Queen's Counsel, demonstrating that he had achieved a substantial degree of professional standing before his appointment to judicial office in India.

Before his judicial career in Bombay, Sausse was employed in England as Secretary and Solicitor to the Commission established to inquire into the state of the Municipal Corporations of England. Later biographical accounts identify this as an important stage in his early professional career, placing him within the wider programme of nineteenth-century British administrative and municipal reform before his eventual appointment to the Indian judiciary.

== Appointment to the Supreme Court of Bombay ==
Sausse entered the judicial service in British India in 1856, when he was appointed a Puisne Judge of the Supreme Court of Bombay. The Supreme Court was then one of the principal superior courts in the Presidency, exercising jurisdiction within the framework of the Crown's judicial institutions in British India.

He served as a Puisne Judge from 1856 until 1859. In 1859, he was elevated to the office of Chief Justice of the Supreme Court of Bombay. His elevation placed him at the head of an institution whose history extended back to the late eighteenth century but whose continued existence was approaching its end as Parliament and the British Government prepared a fundamental reorganisation of the Indian judicial system.

As Chief Justice, Sausse presided during the final years of the Supreme Court of Bombay. His tenure from 1859 to 1862 therefore gave him a particularly important place in the institutional history of Bombay: he became the last Chief Justice of the Supreme Court of Bombay before that Court was replaced by the Bombay High Court.

== The Maharaj Libel Case ==
The most famous judicial episode associated with Sausse is the Maharaj Libel Case, one of the most celebrated trials in the legal and social history of nineteenth-century India. The proceedings arose from a libel action brought by Jadunathji Brijratanji Maharaj against the reformist journalist and writer Karsandas Mulji. The litigation attracted extraordinary public attention because it involved questions of defamation, religious authority, public morality, journalism and the legitimacy of criticism directed towards religious institutions and leaders.

Sausse, then Chief Justice of the Supreme Court of Bombay, heard the case together with Sir Joseph Arnould. The published contemporary volume of the proceedings is expressly titled The Maharaj Libel Case: The Judgements Delivered by Sir Matthew Sausse and Sir Joseph Arnould in the Case of Jadoonathjee Brizruttonjee Maharaj Versus Cursondass Moljee and Another, providing direct evidence of Sausse's role as one of the judges who delivered judgment in the case.

The judgment was delivered on 22 April 1862. Sausse's judgment accepted the defence that the alleged libel was justified by the evidence produced and recognised that the defendant had entered the controversy with the honest object of exposing conduct which he believed to be injurious to public morality. The case subsequently acquired a prominent place in Indian legal and social history because of its implications for public criticism, social reform and the relationship between religious authority and the emerging press.

Sausse's participation in the Maharaj Libel Case was especially significant because the case was decided during the final months of the Supreme Court of Bombay. Within a short period, the judicial system in Bombay was reorganised and Sausse himself would become the first Chief Justice of the institution that succeeded the Supreme Court.

== The creation of the Bombay High Court ==
Sausse's greatest institutional distinction came in 1862. The Indian High Courts Act, 1861 reorganised the superior judicial system in the three Presidency towns by replacing the existing Supreme Courts and Sadr Adalats with newly established High Courts. Bombay was among the first three Presidencies for which a High Court was created.

The formal appointment record provides particularly strong evidence of Sausse's place in this transition. In a notification issued by the India Office on 23 June 1862, The London Gazette recorded that the judges of the Supreme Court and the judges of the Court of Sudder Dewanny Adawlut at Bombay had been appointed judges of the new High Court of Judicature for the Presidency of Bombay. The notification specifically stated:

“Sir Matthew Richard Sausse Knt., Chief Justice of the Supreme Court, to be Chief Justice of the High Court.”

It shows that his appointment was not merely a continuation in an informal sense of his previous office but a specific appointment as Chief Justice of the newly created High Court.

Sausse assumed the leadership of the new High Court at a formative moment in its history. The institution brought together judges from the former Supreme Court and the Sadr Adalat system and was required to develop into a new superior court within the reorganised judicial structure of British India.

His tenure as Chief Justice lasted from 1862 until 1866. Contemporary newspaper material from December 1862 records him presiding over criminal sessions of the newly established High Court as “Chief Justice Sir M. Sausse,” providing contemporary evidence of his active judicial role during the Court's earliest period.

The historical importance of Sausse's tenure lies not simply in its duration but in its position at the beginning of the Court's institutional life. Every subsequent Chief Justice of the Bombay High Court followed a judicial succession that began with him. The Bombay High Court's official list of former Chief Justices accordingly places Sausse first, followed by Sir Richard Couch, who succeeded him in 1866.

== Other judicial work and reputation ==
The surviving material suggests that Sausse was regarded as a careful and technically serious judge. A later official publication discussing a decision of the former Supreme Court of Bombay referred to Sausse as one of the “most careful and accurate Judges that ever sat in a Court in India” and referred to the ability and correctness of his judgments.

His reported judicial work also extended beyond the famous Maharaj Libel Case. Contemporary and later references preserve portions of judgments delivered by him on matters involving commercial transactions and the interpretation of statutory provisions, while another historical source records his consideration of questions involving Muhammadan law and the appointment of a religious office-holder. These surviving references indicate that his judicial work covered a wide range of questions characteristic of the Supreme Court's jurisdiction, rather than being confined to the single case for which he is now principally remembered.

== Personality and private life ==
Despite occupying one of the highest judicial offices in British India, Sausse appears to have cultivated a strikingly private and austere public persona. The Bombay High Court's official biographical account describes him as a “reserved and retiring man” who was strongly averse to mixing in society. According to that official account, Sausse never entered Government House, did not join a club, did not attend dinners or social functions and did not read newspapers. His principal recreation was described as a solitary evening ride along the seashore. His reserved manner became sufficiently associated with his public identity that he was remembered by the sobriquet “Sausse the Silent.” The Bombay High Court's official biography describes him as austere and exclusive in his attitude and associates the sobriquet with his belief in what it calls the “chill isolation of Judges.” The same official account records that Sausse was a devout Roman Catholic and regularly attended Sunday Mass at the Roman Catholic church at Girgaum.

Sausse was married to Charlotte Henrietta, later Lady Sausse. Contemporary probate reporting after his death refers to her as “the Hon. Charlotte Henrietta Lady Sausse” and records provisions made for her under his will.

== Death and will ==
Sausse died on 5 November 1867, approximately one year after his retirement. Contemporary probate material records that he died of gastric fever at Killarney House, seat of Lord Castlerosse. and that his will had been executed in London on 8 July 1867.

The contemporary report concerning his estate provides a revealing insight into his personal connections and religious commitments. It records that his brother, General Sir Richard de la Saussaye, proved the will as executor and residuary legatee. It also records provisions for his widow, his sister and other members of his family.

Particularly significant was a charitable bequest to the Roman Catholic Vicar Apostolic of Bombay, with the income to be applied to the support and education of a student of Irish descent for the Catholic mission in Bombay. This provision is consistent with the Bombay High Court's description of Sausse as a devout Roman Catholic and demonstrates that his connection with Bombay continued even in the arrangements he made shortly before his death.

== Legacy ==
His judicial legacy rests on two principal foundations. The first is institutional: as the first Chief Justice of the Bombay High Court, he presided over the Court during its formative years and stands at the beginning of its succession of Chief Justices. The second is jurisprudential and historical: his judgment in the Maharaj Libel Case remains one of the best-known judicial decisions associated with nineteenth-century Bombay and occupies an important place in the history of Indian journalism, social reform and religious controversy.

Sausse's personality has also become part of his historical legacy. The austere judge who avoided social life, preferred solitary recreation and became known as “Sausse the Silent” presents a striking contrast to the public prominence of the judicial offices he held. The Bombay High Court's own historical account has preserved this image of its first Chief Justice, while his judicial career ensures that his importance extends beyond personality and anecdote.

Ultimately, Sir Matthew Richard Sausse was a lawyer and judge whose career traversed three connected stages: Irish legal practice, judicial service in the Supreme Court of Bombay, and the foundation of the Bombay High Court.
