= Media in Thiruvananthapuram =

Thiruvananthapuram has long been a center of media. Kerala Chandrika, the first newspaper of the state, was published from Thiruvananthapuram in 1789. The media also enjoyed the patronage of the Travancore kings. In 1836, Swathi Thirunal, the Travancore king, organized a government press in the city. The first Superintendent of the Press was the Rev. Sperschneider. The press was under Samathanam Maistry, one of the first batch of workmen trained in the Nagercoil Press.

== Print ==
More than 30 dailies are currently published from Thiruvananthapuram, including prominent dailies The Hindu, The New Indian Express, Desabhimani, Malayala Manorama, Mathrubhumi, Udaya keralam, Kerala Kaumudi, Janayugom, Deepika, Mangalam, Madhyamom, Rashtradeepika, Keralakaumudi Flash and Janmabhoomi. Among English newspapers, 'The Hindu' tops the circulation chart in Thiruvananthapuram with a circulation of 27328, followed by The New Indian Express with a circulation of 26784.. Readership surveys indicated that there was a decline in the readership of all the major dailies in the first quarter of 2010 when compared to 2009.

Several weeklies, fortnightlies, monthlies, bi-monthlies and quarterlies are published from various parts of the city. Government departments and public sector undertakings also publish fortnightlies and monthlies such as Janapadham, Kerala Calling, Vikasana Samanwayam, Kerala Interface, Kerala Karshakan, Punarjani, Vyavasaya Keralam, Grama Deepam, Gramabhoomi, Sahakarana Veedhi, Vidyaarangam, and Panchayat Raj.

The Information and Public Relations Department is the main agency of the government to disseminate information to the public and to provide feedback. At the Government Secretariat, the Department of Information and Public Relations has provided a press room for accredited correspondents. The Tagore Theatre provides both public and private cultural performances and screening of films.

== Electronic ==
=== Radio ===
All India Radio
The Thiruvananthapuram station of All India Radio (AIR) broadcasts and relays daily programs from 5:55 a.m. to 11:05 p.m. FM broadcasting (101.9 MHz), [[Ananthapuri FM, started from Thiruvananthapuram in 1999.

Private FM Stations
Apart from the AIR owned FMs, there are many private FM stations on air in the capital city. On 28 January 2008, 92.7 BIG FM (Reliance Anil Dhirubhai Ambani Group) and Radio Mirchi 98.3 FM (from The Times Group) started its operation. Mathrubhumi launched its Club FM 94.3 the next day. Red FM 93.5 are also on air as of 29 January 2008.

=== Television ===
Doordarshan Logo

Doordarshan
Thiruvananthapuram Doordarshan (DD) Kendra started functioning from the Tagore theatre with a small transmission unit in the latter half of 1982. Later, a full-fledged centre with a high power transmitter was installed at Kudappanakunnu, eight kilometres from the city. Now it covers the entire state, with channel 4 available across Southeast Asia, Africa, Europe, Australia and the America. The DD studios were also set up at Trichur and Kozhikode.

The Asianet logo

Asianet
Asianet is the first and biggest private television channel in the state. It started functioning from Thiruvananthapuram in 1993. Today, it has two more channels, Asianet News and Asianet Plus, and is the private television channel which has an uplinking facility in the city. The Global channel came into being first as a segment catering to the Gulf viewers and grew into a 24-hour channel in 2001. The channel was relaunched as Asianet News on 1 May 2003, signifying an increased stress on news and current affairs in deference to viewers' demands. On 23 July 2005 Asianet launched its third channel, Asianet Plus, a complete entertainment channel for the youth. The signals of Asianet cover the entire Indian sub-continent, Sri Lanka, China, South East Asia, the Persian Gulf, the UK, Europe, USA and the lower half of the former Soviet Union. This is virtually half the globe, reaching sixty-odd countries.

Surya TV Surya Television started operation from Thiruvananthapuram in 1998 as the second private channel of the state. Though Surya has a production facility in Thiruvananthapuram, telecasting is done from Chennai.

Kairali TV
Kairali Television, which went on air in 2000, also has its studio and production facilities in Thiruvananthapuram. The telecasting is from Ernakulam. This channel is known for its support to a major political party in Kerala - the Communist Party of India (Marxist) (CPI(M)). Currently Mammootty, a major actor in Malayalam, holds the post of MD at Kairali. They are planning to build a new state-of-the art building as their headquarters. Now Kairali has launched two more channels : Kairali WE (youth channel) and Kairali News.

Amrita TV
Amrita Television launched in 2005 as a 24-hour Malayalam, general entertainment and news satellite channel.

JaiHind TV
JaiHind TVl is based on Thiruvananthapuram. Programs on the channel are a mix of news and entertainment. The channel is backed by the Congress Party of Kerala. The channel is headed by prominent personalities in the field of journalism.

Mathrubhumi News
Mathrubhumi News launched in 2012 as a 24-hour general entertainment and news satellite channel with a global footprint.

Flowers TV
Flowers TV Flowers TV is an Indian Malayalam language general entertainment pay television channel owned by Insight Media City. The channel was launched on 12 April 2015.

FUNTV
FUNTV, the first interactive gaming channel in India, started operating in Trivandrum from May 2006 through the major cable TV networks SITI Cable and TCN.

Kappa TV
Kappa TV launched in 2013 as a 24-hour entertainment channel. Studio Complex is at Vanchiyoor. Kappa TV is owned by the Mathrubhumi group.

News 18 Kerala
News 18 Kerala is a Malayalam language news television channel It is owned by Network 18. It was launched in 2016 as part of recent expansion plan of News 18 franchise in Tamil Nadu, Kerala and Assam-North East. The channel Headquarters is situated at Akkalum, Trivandrum.

Kaumudy TV
Kaumudy TV is a Malayalam television channel owned by the owners of the Malayalam daily newspaper Kerala Kaumudi. The channel was officially launched on 5 May 2013. Prime Minister Manmohan Singh had already unveiled the logo of the channel a year earlier during the centenary celebrations of Kerala Kaumudi. The programme menu comprises news, talks, interviews and entertainment. The studio complex is situated at Pettah, Trivandrum.

Sakhi TV
Sakhi TV is a complete women's Malayalam language GEC television channel based on Karamana, Trivandrum.

Janam TV
Janam TV is an Indian television channel based in Trivandrum which broadcasts news and entertainment programmes in Malayalam. It is operated by Janam Multimedia Ltd. For the Time being Studio Complex is at Chakka, Trivandrum and new complex is being constructed at Sreevaraham, Trivandrum.

Other channels
Kiran TV (youth channel of Surya TV), Asianet Plus (youth channel of Asianet), and People TV (news and current affairs channel of Kairali TV) also have production facilities and studios in the city.

Jeevan TV, ZeeTV, NDTV, ANI, ETV, and JAYA TV have their bureaus in Thiruvananthapuram. ACV and SITI Cable are cable channels which operate from the city.

== Film ==
Film Studios in Trivandrum

Chitranjali Film City
Kinfra Film and Video Park
Aries Vismaya Max
Accel Studios
Aries Epica
PANACHI Studios

Dolby Atmos Mixing Lab

Toonz Animation
