= Bansilal Verma =

- Born: 23 November 1917; Chotiya, Mehasana, Gujarat, British Raj
- Died: 8 August 2003 (aged 85)
- Occupations: cartoonist, illustrator
- Years active: 1935–2003
- Awards: Ravishankar Raval Award

Bansilal Verma (1917–2003), better known by his pen name Chakor, was a cartoonist and illustrator from Gujarat, India.

== Life ==
Bansilal Verma was born on 23 November 1917 at Chotiya village near Taranga (now in Mehsana district, Gujarat) to Jamnagauri and Gulabrai. His family belonged to Vadnagar from where he matriculated. He was inspired by Raja Ravi Verma and used to draw paintings of gods and goddesses. During his teen years, he moved to Ahmedabad from Vadnagar and joined artist Ravishankar Raval to learn the art in 1935. In 1936, he served as an artist for three months in Lucknow session of Indian National Congress. He also met Nandalal Bose. In 1937, he joined Navsaurashtra, edited by Kakalbhai Kothari, as a cartoonist. He also contributed to the Indian Independence Movement by drawing posters, banners and cartoons. He also drew cartoons for Prajabandhu weekly, Gati and Rekha magazines edited by Jayanti Dalal.

In 1948, he went to Bombay and joined Hindustan daily. After the death of Sardar Patel, Hindustan stopped. Bansilal Verma then worked with Janmabhoomi from 1955 to 1959. In 1959, he joined the English daily The Free Press Journal and his cartoons were also published in the Gujarati daily Janshakti. His cartoons on politics and politician were influential. Due to political pressure, he left that job in 1972. In 1978, he came to Ahmedabad and joined Sandesh where he worked for years. He also illustrated several books and magazines.

He died on 8 August 2003.

== Works ==
He drew under pen names Chakor, Bansi and Kishor Vakil. His illustration of Indian lady welcoming with folded hand is very popular.

His books of cartoons and caricatures are also published. His large number of cartoons are published in newspapers and magazines. He had also painted domes of some Jain temples, 25 paintings, large number of illustrations and covers for books. Vamanmathi Virat is his notable collection of cartoons on Lal Bahadur Shastri. He also illustrated two colouring books published by Khadi and Gramodyog. He has published children's comic books; Hanuman, Shiv-Parvati, Karna, Vikram Ane Vetal and Veer Balko. Some of his paintings are stored in Mysore Art Gallery. His humour articles are collected in Vinod Vatika. He has written essays such as Bharatma Angreji Amal and Shantimay Kranti.

== Recognition ==
He won a prize at Third International Salon of Cartoons in Montreal, Canada for a cartoon titled If Dragon Comes To UN, published in The Free Press Journal. He had also received Sanskar Award, Surat Lions Shield, Kamalashankar Pandya Award and Vadnagar Nagrik Sanman. He received Ravishankar Raval Award instituted by Government of Gujarat. A square near Vasna-Pirana bridge in Ahmedabad is named after him.
