= Kakalbhai Ravjibhai Kothari =

Indian journalist

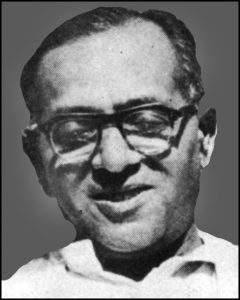
- Kothari
- Born: 1903
- Place: Kathiawar, Gujarat
- Work: Indian Journalist
- Legacy: Founder of Prabhat Prabhat group of Newspapers (1934)
- Death: Ahmedabad (1965)
- Spouse: Soorajba Kothari
- Children: Bachubhai Kothari, Rajnikant Kothari

Kakalbhai Ravjibhai Kothari was an Indian freedom fighter, journalist, editor, and social reformer from the Kathiawar region of present-day Gujarat. His contributions were majorly to the struggle of the Indians to get independence especially in his pioneering work on the Gujarati press. Kothari was also a person active in the mobilization of the nationalist cause and expressing the interests of the population in the princely colonials of the time. He was the founder of The Prabhat, a newspaper which has been continuously published for over 90 years.

== Early life and education ==
Kakalbhai Kothari was born in 1902 in Kathiawar, a historical province that contained several princely states. His childhood was filled with national enthusiasm, and this affected him as a youngster, drawing him toward the ideas of freedom of the press and self-governance.

== Role in the Freedom Movement ==
Kothari actively participated in the Indian freedom struggle. In 1920, he participated in the Tilak Swaraj Fund collection in Saurashtra, which was organized to finance the national movement of the Congress. He also worked in arousing Western India's support against the Non-Cooperation Movement and subsequently the Civil Disobedience Movement.

Kothari also led the political awakening of the princely states becoming a part of the Kathiawar States People Convention in the 1930s. This campaign was aimed at placing awareness in the minds of the subjects to the princely rulers that they had a right and that they needed to associate with the larger freedom movement. In a letter to Kothari dated 2 November 1933, Jawaharlal Nehru talks about the correspondence taking place between the two concerning these activities.

== Journalism and editorial work ==
Kothari began his journalism career at Phulchhab, a Gujarati newspaper known for its reformist and nationalist tone. In 1934, he founded his own daily newspaper, The Prabhat, which quickly became a platform for articulating the nationalist agenda. He later edited the weekly Navsaurashtra, which covered socio-political developments and carried articles in favor of swaraj (self-rule).

Kothari was also associated with the Janmabhoomi group of newspapers, through which he continued to disseminate political awareness and press for reforms. His editorials often challenged British policies and called for solidarity among Indian states and commoners. In 1928, he authored a biographical book titled Narveer Lalaji, which detailed the life and contributions of a fellow nationalist and social worker. The book was among the earliest biographical efforts in Gujarati literature to celebrate contemporary freedom fighters.

== Later activities and social work ==
Apart from his journalism and political work, Kothari was a vocal advocate for education, press freedom, and social equity. He campaigned for literacy among rural populations and supported constructive programs aligned with Gandhian principles, such as khadi promotion and sanitation. He also played a role in developing literary circles in Gujarat, encouraging the growth of independent thought and writing. Several journalists and writers who later emerged as leading figures in Gujarat's literary community credited Kothari for mentoring and supporting their early careers.

== Legacy ==
Kakalbhai Kothari has been acknowledged by the Government of India as one of the unsung heroes of the India independence struggle.He is also included in the official portal of the Azadi Ka Amrit Mahotsav initiative, featuring little-known freedom fighters. His presence has not been quite as well-regarded in popular history, but his contribution to the facturation of the popular opinion, confrontation of the colonial discourse in the press, and democratic reforms in state-states under the princes is substantial.

His work is still remembered at journalism schools and in Gujarat circles of historical knowledge where he is credited as an early leader of politically involved Gujarati journalism.

== Prabhat group of newspapers ==
Kakalbhai Kothari, an Indian journalist, founded the Gujarati daily newspaper The Prabhat, building on his earlier editorial work with Saurashtra and Phulchhab. Prabhat was one of the earliest Gujarati-language daily newspapers and became known for its coverage of socio-political issues, the Indian nationalist movement, and regional affairs. The newspaper earned a reputation for its outspoken criticism of the British colonial administration and its editorials advocating Indian self-rule.

Over the decades, The Prabhat evolved into a credible source of news for Gujarati readers and has continued its publication for over 90 years, making it one of the longest-running Gujarati newspapers in India. It remains influential in Gujarat's journalistic and political circles even today.

The newspaper was printed and published from Prabhat Bhavan, located in Ahmedabad, under the banner of Kothari Printers. It was one of the few newspapers of the time to integrate editorial, publishing, and printing under a single roof. The Prabhat is still run successfully by the Kothari family from Ahmedabad, Gujarat, India.

== See also ==
- Indian independence movement
- Journalism in Gujarat
- Janmabhoomi (Gujarati newspaper)
- Media in Gujarati language
- Phulchhab
- Bansilal Verma
- Chunilal Madia
- List of People from Ahmedabad
