= Jhaverchand Meghani =

Indian poet, writer, social reformer and freedom fighter

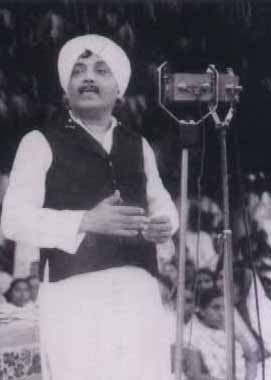
- Born: 28 August 1896; Chotila, Bombay presidency, British India
- Died: 9 March 1947 (aged 50); Botad, Bombay presidency, British India
- Occupations: Poet; playwright; editor; folklorist
- Children: 9, including Jayant Meghani, Mahendra Meghani, Vinod Meghani
- Writing career
- Period: Pre-Independence India
- Notable awards: Ranjitram Suvarna Chandrak (1928)
- Website: Official website

Jhaverchand or Zaverchand Kalidas Meghani (28 August 1896 – 9 March 1947) was an Indian poet, writer, social reformer and freedom fighter. He is a well-known name in the field of Gujarati literature. He was born in a Jain family in Chotila where the Government College has been renamed for this literary figure as Raashtreeya Shaayar Zaverchand Meghani College, Chotila. Mahatma Gandhi spontaneously gave him the title of Raashtreeya Shaayar (National Poet).

Besides this he received many awards like Ranjitram Suvarna Chandrak and Mahida Paaritoshik in literature. He authored more than 100 books. His first book was a translation work of Rabindranath Tagore's called Kathaa-u-Kaahinee titled Kurbani Ni Katha (Stories of martyrdom) which was first published in 1922. He contributed widely to Gujarati folk literature. He went from village to village in search of folk-lores and published them in various volumes of Saurashtra Ni Rasdhar. He was also the Editor of Phulchhab Newspaper of Janmabhoomi group (which is being published till date from Rajkot).

A sample of his collection of folk tales from Saurashtra has recently been published in English, with the translation done by his son Vinod Meghani. The three volumes published so far are titled A Noble Heritage, A Shade Crimson and The Ruby Shattered.

His poems are taught as a part of syllabus in Gujarat Board Schools (GSEB).

== Life ==
Jhaverchand Meghani was born on 28 August 1896 in Chotila, Gujarat, to Kalidas and Dholima Meghani. His father Kalidas worked in the Police force and hence was often transferred to new places causing most of Jhaverchand's education to happen in Rajkot. He had two brothers Lalchand and Prabhashankar. He was married to a woman named Damyanti at the age of 24 and following the demise of his wife, he married Chitradevi at the age of 36. He had 9 children out of which 3 were girls namely Indu, Padmala and Murli, while 6 were boys, namely Mahendra, Mastan, Nanak, Vinod, Jayant and Ashok.

=== Early life ===
He lived a simple and sober life and his simplicity prompted his college mates to call him Raja Janak.

He habitually wore a white long coat, a dhoti reaching well down the knees and a turban typically tied around his head. He finished his matriculation in 1912 and completed his BA in 1917. He started his career in Kolkata and joined Jeevanlal and Co. in 1918 as Personal Assistant and was fondly called Paghadee Babu by his colleagues and workers alike. He was soon promoted as the Manager of the company's factory at Belur, Crown Aluminium. In 1919, he went to England for a four-month tour. After coming back to India, he continued to work in Kolkata for 2 and half-years. Later, he returned to Saurashtra and joined the editorial board of the weekly Saurashtra at Rajkot in 1922.

=== Contribution to the freedom struggle ===
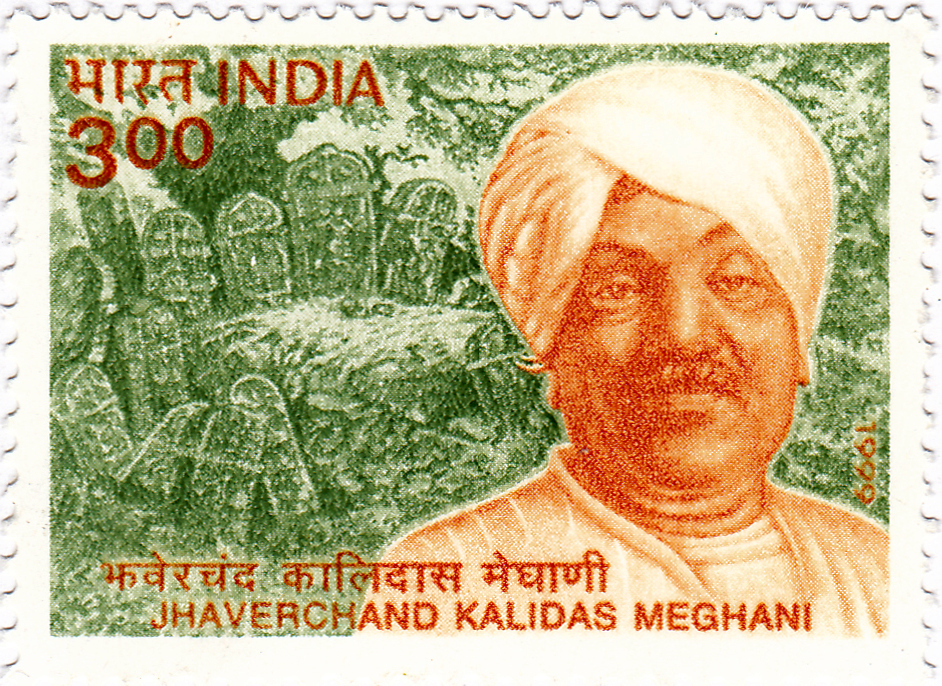
Meghani on a 1999 stamp of India

In 1930, he was sentenced to 2 years in jail for writing the book Sindhudo that contained songs to inspire the youth of India that was participating in the struggle for Independence against the British Raj. It is during this time that he wrote Kavya Triputi based on Gandhiji's visit to London for the Round Table conference. During this period, he also started writing short stories independently and served as editor for Phoolchaab magazine.

== Publications ==
In 1926, he ventured into poetry with his book of children poems Veni Na Phool and started writing in Janmabhumi under the column Kalam Ane Kitaab. He established his reputation as a critic by his independent novels. In 1936, he became the editor of Phoolchaab. In 1942, he ventured into publishing with his book Marela Na Rudhir. In 1945, after retiring from Phoolchaab, he concentrated on personal writing. In 1946, his book Mansai Na Deeva was awarded the Mahida Award. The same year, he was elected to head the Gujarati Sahitya Parishad's Sahitya Section. In 1929, he gave 6 lectures for Gyan Prasarak Mandali. He also lectured at Santiniketan owing to his long association with Rabindranath Tagore. Meghani was also known as a Manbhatt poet due to his significant contribution to folk ballads. A movie song Man Mor Bani Thangat Kare in the 2013 Hindi film Goliyon Ki Raasleela Ram-Leela is written by him.

=== Folklores ===
- Doshi Ni Vato
- Sorathi Baharvatiya
- Sorathi Baharvatiya 3–1929
- Saurashtra Ni Rasdhar 1
- Saurashtra Ni Rasdhar 2
- Saurashtra Ni Rasdhar 3
- Saurashtra Ni Rasdhar 4
- Saurashtra Ni Rasdhar 5
- Kankavati 1–1927
- Kankavati 2–1928
- Dadaji Ni Vato
- Sorthi Santo-1928
- Sorthi Geetkathao-1931
- Puratan Jyot-1938
- Rang Che Barot-1945
- Loksahitya-1939
- Pagandino Panth-1942
- Charano Ane Charani Sahitya-1943
- Dhartinu Dhavan-1944
- Loksahitya Nu Samalochan-1946

=== Poems ===
- Veni Na Phool (1927)
- Killol (1930)
- Sindhudo (1930)
- Yugvandana (1935)
- Ektaro (1940)
- Bapuna Parna (1943)
- Ravindra Veena (1944)
- Midnight Lace (1946)

=== Folk Songs ===
- Radhiyali Raat 1–1925
- Radhiyali Raat 2–1925
- Radhiyali Raat 3–1927
- Radhiyali Raat 4–1942
- Chundadi 1–1928
- Chundadi 2–1929
- Rutugeeto-1929
- Halarda-1929
- Sorthi Santvani-1947
- Sorthiya Duha-1947

=== Drama ===
- Rano Pratap (Translation)-1923
- Raja Rani-1924
- Shah Jahan (Translation)-1927
- Vanthela-1933

=== Travelogue ===
- Saurashtrana Khandaroma-1928
- Sorathne Tire Tire-1933
- Parkamma-1946
- Chellu Prayan-1947

=== Short stories ===
- Kurbani Ni Kathao-1922
- Chinta Na Angara 1–1931
- Chinta Na Angara 2–1932
- Meghani, Jhaverchand (2015) [1934]. Jail Office Ni Baari. Ahmedabad: Sanskar Sahitya Mandir. ISBN 978-93-83815-25-8.
- Dariyaparna Bahrvatiya-1932
- Pratimao-1932
- Meghani, Jhaverchand (2014) [1935]. Palkara. Ahmedabad: Sanskar Sahitya Mandir. ISBN 978-93-83815-11-1.
- Dhup Chaya-1935
- Meghanini Navlikao 1 and 2–1942
- Vilopan-1946
- Anu nam te dhani

=== Novels ===
- Meghani, Jhaverchand (2013) [1932]. Satya Ni Shodhma. Ahmedabad: Rajesh Book Sellers. ISBN 978-93-85588-08-2.
- ''Niranjan''
- ''Vasundharana Vahala Davla''
- ''Sorath, Tara Vaheta Pani''
- Samarangan-1928
- Meghani, Jhaverchand (2013) [1938]. Aparadhi. Ahmedabad: Rajesh Book Sellers. ISBN 978-93-85588-15-0.
- Vevishal
- ''Ra Gangajaliyo''-1
- ''Ra Gangajaliyo'' -2
- ''Bidela Dwar''
- Gujaratno Jay 1–1940
- Gujaratno Jay 2–1942
- Tulsi Kyaro-1940
- Meghani, Jhaverchand (2013) [1943]. Prabhu Padharya. Ahmedabad: Rajesh Book Sellers. ISBN 978-93-85588-17-4.
- Kalchakra-1947
- Garvi Gujarat

=== Biography ===
- Annie Besant-1927
- Hungary no Taaranahaar-1927
- Narvir Lalaji-1927
- Satyavir Shradhdhanand-1927
- Sorathee Santo-1928
- Puraatan Jyot −1938
- Thakkar Bapa-1939
- Akbar Ni Yaadma-1942
- Aapnu Ghar-1942
- Panch Varas Na Pankhida-1942
- Marelana Rudhir-1942
- Aapna Gharni Vadhu Vato-1943
- Dayanand Sarasvati-1944
- Meghani, Jhaverchand (2013) [1945]. Mansaina Deeva. Ahmedabad: Rajesh Book Sellers. ISBN 978-93-85588-09-9.
- Sant Deveedaas-1946
- Vasant-Rajab Smaarak Granth-1947

== See also ==
- List of Gujarati-language writers
