= List of Gujarati-language magazines =

This is a list of magazines published in the Gujarati language of India.

== List ==
- Buddhiprakash
- Chetana
- Chitralekha
- Dalitchetna
- Dhabak
- Doot
- Gazalvishwa
- Gujarati (1880–1929)
- Jnanasudha
- Kavilok
- Kaumudi (1924–1937)
- Kumar
- Parivesh
- Priyamvada (1885–1890)
- Ruchi
- Safari
- Satyaprakash
- Shabdasrishti
- Stribodh
- Sudarshan
- Vismi Sadi (magazine) (1916–1920)
- Vasant (1902–1939)

Sources: Buddhiprakash, Chetana (Surat), Chitralekha.

== See also ==
- Media in Gujarati language
- List of magazines in India
- Media of India
