= Mahendra Meghani =

Mahendra Meghani (20 June 1922 - 3 August 2022) was an Indian journalist, editor, author, and publisher. He was the eldest son of the Gujarati poet Jhaverchand Meghani. He was the founder and editor of the Gujarati magazine Milap. He had edited and translated more than 12 works.

== Early life and education ==
Mahendra Meghani was born in Mumbai on 20 June 1922. He received his primary and secondary education in Bhavnagar. In 1942, he studied for two years at L. D. Arts College in Ahmedabad, but later moved to Mumbai and dropped out during the Quit India Movement. He worked with his father as a writer and journalist from 1944. In 1948, he went to Columbia University in New York to study journalism. He studied there between 1948 and 1949.

== Career ==
Meghani began his career by writing a series of articles for the Gujarati daily Nutan Gujarat based in New York. In 1950, after returning from New York, he started the Milap magazine in Mumbai, which became India's first vernacular monthly digest and was a respected magazine in Gujarat. He ran this magazine until 1978.

In 1953, he traveled to Europe, accompanying the then Prime Minister of India, Jawaharlal Nehru. Following this trip, he transformed Lok Milap Karyalaya into the Lok Milap Trust in 1968, which focused on publishing quality Gujarati books and promoting cultural activities. In 1969, during the centenary year of Mahatma Gandhi's birth, Meghani traveled to various countries across five continents to organize exhibitions of Indian books and promote Indian thought and Gandhi's ideas. Under the aegis of the Lok Milap Trust, he started publishing excellent Gujarati books at affordable prices to make them accessible to the general public. Lok Milap published more than 100 books based on the guiding principles of short text and fewer pages due to readers' limited time, small book size due to limited storage space, and very low book price due to limited purchasing power.

During the emergency in 1975, Meghani opposed the press censorship during the Emergency imposed by the Indira Gandhi government, which led to the closure of his press by the authorities. He also fought against Akashvani (All India Radio) in the early 1950s regarding the royalties for his father's works, considering it a matter of the dignity of writers.

In 1986, on the 90th birth anniversary of Jhaverchand Meghani, he undertook a 90-day 'Vachan Yatra' (reading journey) across 90 villages. He also published Ardhi Sadini Vachanyatra (A Half Century of Reading Journey), a collection of literary works curated from his 50 years as a reader, which gained significant popularity. More than 2 lakh copies of the first four volumes of these books were sold at a very low price of Rs. 75 in a short period.

During the Gujarat assembly elections, he published a sixteen-page booklet called Saune Mate Rajkarananu Samanya Gnan (General Knowledge of Politics for All) free of charge, aiming to provide insights into democracy. In the 2014 Indian general elections, he attempted to campaign for voters to obtain a written guarantee from candidates against misbehavior in the Parliament. He also started "Film Milap" in Bhavnagar showcasing films.

== Death ==
Mahendra Meghani died at his residence in Bhavnagar on the evening of 3 August 2022. He had entered his 100th year on June 20 of the same year. His funeral procession took place on 4 August 2022 from his residence in Bhavnagar.

== Works ==
He had edited and translated more than 12 works.

=== Edited works ===
- Ardhi Sadini Vachanyatra (A Half Century of Reading Journey) - in five volumes, a collection of selected articles from the Milap magazine.
- Vachanyatrano Prasad
- Nahi Visarata Kavyo (Poems Not To Be Forgotten) - a compilation featuring one hundred poems by one hundred poets.
- Aapna Santano (Our Children), Aapni Dharmikta (Our Religiousness), Aapno Gharsansar (Our Household), and Aapna Ba (Our Mother) - collections featuring selected writings from various authors.

=== Translations ===
- Kon-Tiki (translation of The Kon-Tiki Expedition)
- Tibetni Bhitarma (translation of Seven Years in Tibet)
- Bhaibandh (translation of School Boys by Nikolay Nosov)

== See also ==
- List of Gujarati-language writers
