= Stribodh =

Gujarati-language women's magazine

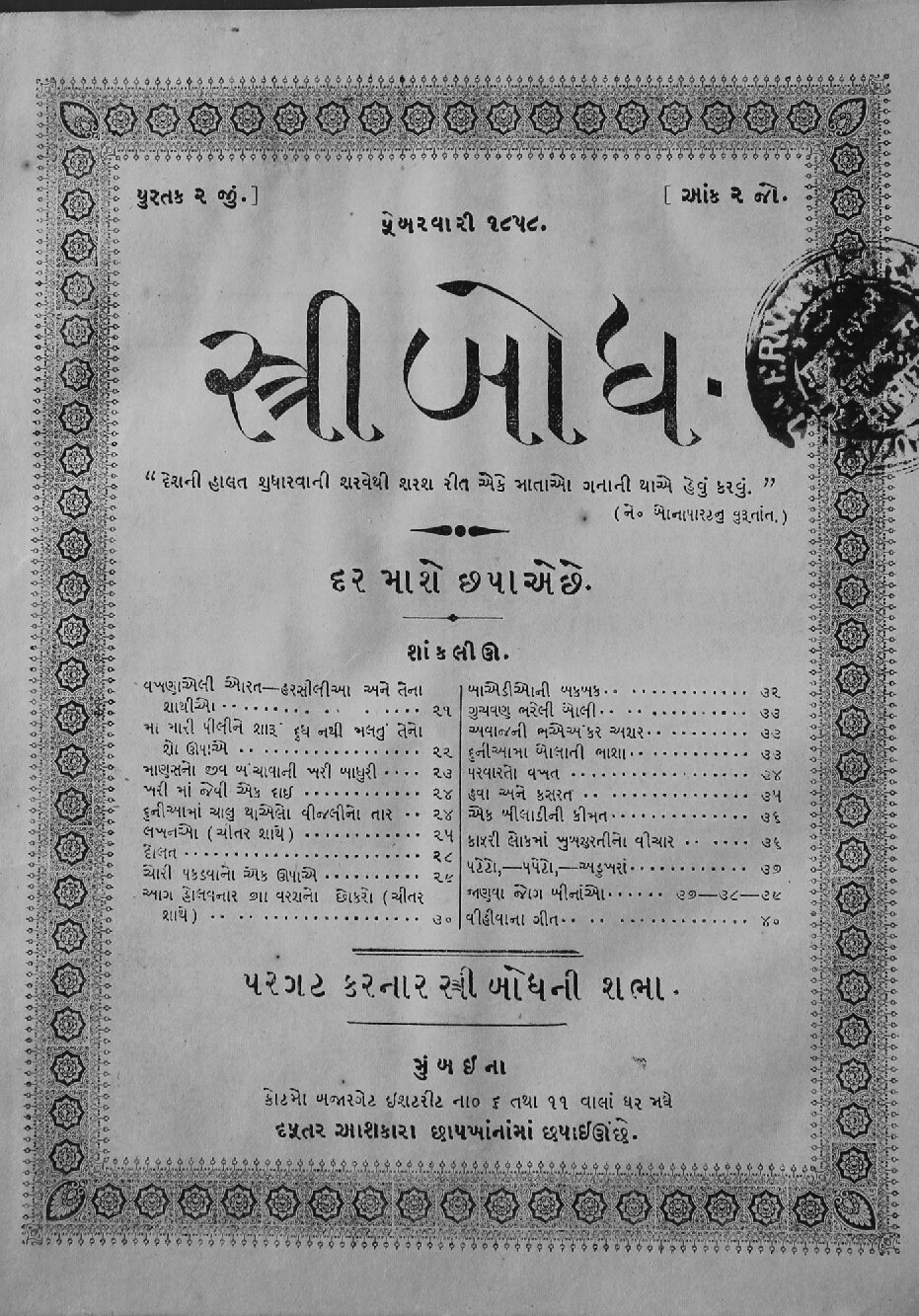
- Cover page of Stribodh issue of February 1858 (vol. 2, no.2)
- Founder: K. N. Kabra
- First issue: 1857
- Final issue: 1952
- Country: India
- Language: Gujarati

Stribodh (Gujarati: સ્ત્રી બોધ; also transliterated as Streebodh) was a monthly journal/magazine in Gujarati language. Founded in 1857 by a group of social reformers, the journal was one of the earliest magazines aimed at a women's audience in India. (Note: Shukla and a few other scholars have deemed Stribodh as the earliest journal/magazine aimed at a women's audience in India. However, Masik Patrika, a monthly magazine launched by Bengali intellectuals Peary Chand Mitra and Radhanath Sikdar, predated Stribodh by about three years and was particularly meant for women. It was launched in 1854 and folded up four years later.)

The magazine was launched to aid in the improvement of female education and improve the overall quality of female domestic life. Advocacy for social reforms was nearly absent, contrary to popular perceptions. It is primarily seen as a medium in conforming upper- and middle-class women to then-prevalent standards of Victorian morality.

It ceased publication in 1952.

== History ==
Stribodh was established in January 1857 by a group of Parsi and Hindu social reformers: Kaikhosro Nowroji Kabraji, editor of the progressive newspaper Rast Goftar, along with businessman Mangaldas Nathubhoy, lawyer Nanabhai Haridas (who would later become the first Indian justice of Bombay High Court), and Karsandas Mulji, a social reformer. Sorabji Shapurji Bengali played an important role as well. It was published from Duftur Ashkara Press and was the earliest magazine directed towards a female audience in Gujarat.

From 1857 to 1863, the magazine was jointly edited by Beheramji Gandhi, Sorabaji Shapurji, Karsandas Mulji, Mangaldas Nathubhoy and Nanabhai Haridas. Karsandas was the editor from 1865 to 1867; thereafter, K.N. Kabra held the position until his death in 1904. It was later edited by his daughter Sirin (who was probably Gujarat's first gynecologist) until 1914, before his daughter-in-law Putlibai Jahangir Kabaraji took over. After Putlibai's death in 1941, Keshav Prasad Desai (who was already co-editing the magazine with Putlibai for the last few years) took over the entire business and editorship.

It was discontinued in 1952.

== Readership ==
Stribodh was primarily aimed at upper- and middle-class women of leisure, because males from those families were most open to primitive gender reforms due to their own dealings with varied elements of the British Raj.

The subscription fees were initially set at ₹3 per year but it was halved in 1914. In its initial years, it also gifted a book to the annual subscribers.

== Contents ==
=== First issue ===
The preface to the first issue noted its core purpose was to aid in the improvement of female education and improve the overall quality of female domestic life. The journal was intended to be a good recreational read, which would help to inculcate a proper interest in reading and then follow up with introductory skills in a variety of menial tasks, so that rich women could spend their time creatively whilst poor women could contribute to the income in their household.

=== General format ===
Issues usually had about 20-22 pages of double-demy size (Note: Double-demy is a size of paper used in old England.) and contained illustrated stories and articles ranging from fiction and poems to travelogues and discourses about historical events, inventions and everyday science. The motto, which was printed on the first page of every issue, was a quote from Napoleon and emphasized the role of female education in nation building.

=== Authors ===
The prominent writers were primarily local Parsee businessmen and social reformers. Barring Dalpatram, Narmad and few others, there was an absence of mainstream figures from the establishment of creative literature in their author roles; this was exacerbated with the increasing affinity of the literary establishment towards conservative cultural revivalism after the 1870s (since referred to as the Pandit era in Gujarati literature). This is reflected in the magazine not being an accurate representation of contemporary vernacular literary styles.

=== Themes ===
Most of the articles were designed to instill general moral values; vices of greed, vanity, laziness, disloyalty, superstitions et al. were denounced whilst the virtues of hard work, honesty et al. were praised. There were frequent pieces about being a "loving house-wife" or an "effective governess". An article that discussed the general necessity of women to preserve their youth garnered widespread popularity among readers. Other pieces offered instruction on domestic topics from sewing and embroidery to arranging furniture and using Western eating utensils. Some of the articles provided health advice (e.g. to menstruating women and pregnant mothers).

Shukla notes that the magazine almost completely distanced itself from advocating for social reforms. During the heyday of advocacy for widow remarriage, a few fictional pieces published in Stribodh described the plight of widows in a negative tone, but nowhere was widow remarriage explicitly called for. There was similar lack of coverage of other contemporary issues of social reform, including sexual exploitation of devdasis, abolition of female infanticide, restitution of conjugal rights in case of child marriage and raising the age of consent for sexual intercourse for all girls. This was contrary to other publications by social reformers, aimed at a general (primarily upper-caste male) audience, which were vocal advocates for various social reforms and covered them extensively. All these issues were not mentioned in the magazine until years later, long after the issues had been conclusively settled.

The fictional articles increased over the course of time, especially as European classics were adapted and serialized under Kabra's tutelage; this led to a considerable increase in readership.

== Reception ==
Scholars have challenged the popular view of the magazine as an advocate for social reforms. In light of the aforementioned themes, scholars now deem Stribodh's primary purpose as to merely conform women to then-prevalent standards of patriarchy. It viewed women as deserving of chivalrous treatment from men but not fit enough to engage in public discourse about social reforms.

== See also ==
- List of Gujarati-language magazines
