= Jai Hind (newspaper) =

Indian newspaper

- Type: Daily newspaper
- Format: Broadsheet
- Owner(s): Jaihind Group
- Publisher: Jaihind Group
- Founded: 1948
- Political alignment: Center
- Language: Gujarati
- Headquarters: Rajkot, India
- Country: India
- Website: jaihindnewspaper.com
- Free online archives: www.jaihindnewspaper.com/epaper/index

Jai Hind is a newspaper published daily in Gujarati from Rajkot, Gujarat, India and owned by Jai Hind Publications.

It is circulated in Rajkot, Ahmedabad, Jamnagar, Junagadh, Porbandar, Bhavnagar, Amreli, Surendranagar and Kutch regions of Gujarat, India. N. L. Shah (Babubhai or Babulal) was the founder of Jai Hind. It was the first daily Gujarati newspaper to be published from Rajkot.

Jai Hind was founded in 1948 in Rajkot, and an Ahmedabad edition began in 1962. It is the first newspaper in Gujarati to have introduced modern printing technology and speedy distribution system of the newspaper. It was also the first daily newspaper in Gujarat to have simultaneous editions from two centers.

== Legal disputes ==
In 1950, the Chief Secretary from the Government of Saurashtra issued an order to the effect that the content of several newspaper, including Jai Hind, dealing with the disturbances in Rajkot that year, should be submitted by the papers before publication to the District Magistrate for scrutiny. The legality of this order was rejected by the High Court of Gujarat at Ahmedabad on 11 September 1950.
