= Jayant Meghani =

Indian editor and translator from Gujarat (1938–2020)

- Born: 10 August 1938; Botad, British India
- Died: 4 December 2020 (aged 82); Bhavnagar, Gujarat, India
- Education: B. Com., Diploma in Library Science
- Alma mater: Gujarat University; Maharaja Sayajirao University of Baroda
- Occupations: editor and translator
- Relatives: Jhaverchand Meghani (father)
- Writing career
- Language: Gujarati, English
- Notable work: Collected Works of Jhaverchand Meghani

Jayant Jhaverchand Meghani (10 August 1938 – 4 December 2020) was an Indian editor, translator and bookman from Gujarat, India. He was the fifth son of Gujarati writer Jhaverchand Meghani whose several works he edited.

== Biography ==
Meghani was born on 10 August 1938 in Botad, Gujarat as the fifth son of Jhaverchand Meghani, a Gujarati writer. After schooling in Botad, he completed his Bachelor of Commerce from Gujarat University, Ahmedabad in 1960, and obtained a Diploma in Library Science from Maharaja Sayajirao University of Baroda in 1962.

He worked as a librarian at Gandhi Smriti Library, Bhavnagar for six years, and then as a manager at Lokmilap Trust, Bhavnagar for eight years. In 1972, he founded Prasar, a book shop in Bhavnagar.

He died on 4 December 2020 in Bhavnagar.

== Works ==
Meghani edited several books including Sona-Navadi : Samagra Kavita, Saurashtra Ni Rasadhar : Sankalit Avritti, Sorathi Baharvatia : Sankalit Avritti, Radhiali Raat : Brihad Avritti, Loksahitya ane Charani Sahitya' : Vyakhyano ane Lekho', Meghani Na Natako (1997), Meghani Ni Samagra Navalika (1998), and Paribhraman: Navsankaran (2009, with Ashok Meghani). These edited volumes were later included in the Complete works of Jhaverchand Meghani, published by Gujarat Sahitya Academy, which were also edited by Meghani himself. He had completed editing of 12 volumes of the 19-volume series.

He has also written Saptaparni, Anukruti, Ravindra-Putravadhu as well as The Story of Gandhi.

He translated four books for the Oxford Illustrated Stories for Adult series: Aladin Ane Alibaba (1984), Columbus (1984), Apaharan (1986), and Hercules (1986). He translated Hiuan-Tsang No Bharat-Pravas (1995) for National Book Trust's Nehru Children Library Series. He translated Rabindranath Tagore's several poems under the title Tanakhala which is also notable for its design. He translated Mittal Patel's book Sarnama Vina Na Manvio (People Without Address) from Gujarati to English.

== Reception ==
Sanjay Shripad Bhave has called his editing "exemplary" and attributed it to his expertise in literature, bookkeeping and library science.

== See also ==
- List of Gujarati-language writers
