= Enanalloor =

- village
- Location in Kerala, India Enanalloor (India)
- Coordinates: 9°58′0″N 76°38′0″E
- Country: India
- State: Kerala
- District: Ernakulam

Population (2011)
  - Total: 22,561

Languages
  - Official: Malayalam, English
- Time zone: UTC+5:30 (IST)
- Vehicle registration: KL

Enanalloor is a village in Ernakulam district in the Indian state of Kerala.

== Demographics ==
As of 2011 India census, Enanalloor had a population of 22561 with 11257 males and 11304 females.
