= Gokuldas Tejpal =

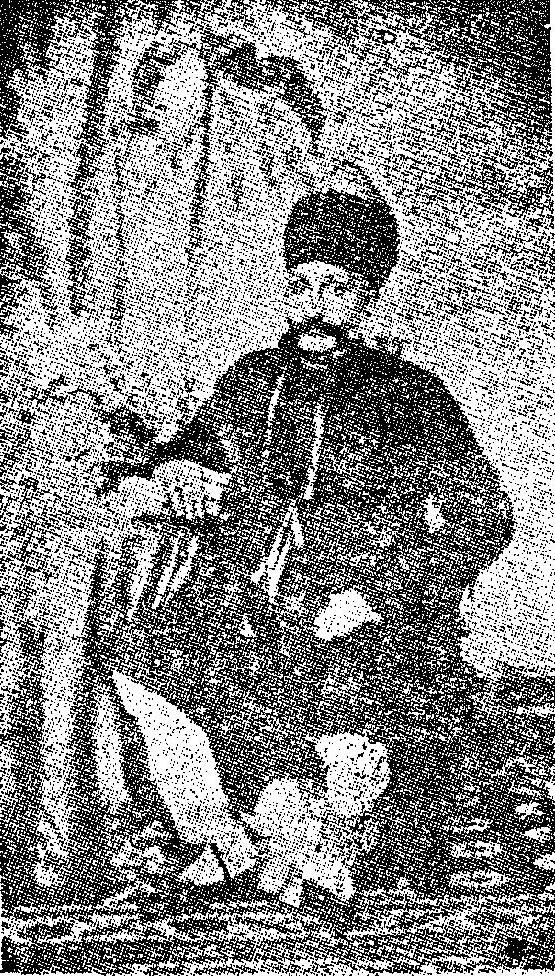
Gokuldas Tejpal from Mahaapurushhula-jiivitamulu (page 212 crop)

Sheth Gokuldas Tejpal or Sheth Goculdas Tejpal (1822–1867) was a merchant, businessman, social reformer and philanthropist from Bombay, British India. Gokuldas, who hailed from Gujarati Bhatia community, was well known for building charity institutions, hospitals, schools, hostels including famous Gokuldas Tejpal Hospital Gokuldas Tejpal Sanskrit College, where the first session of Indian National Congress was held On 28 December 1885. He also built the Gokuldas Tejpal Anglo-vernacular high school and Gokuldas Tejpal Boarding House.

== Life ==
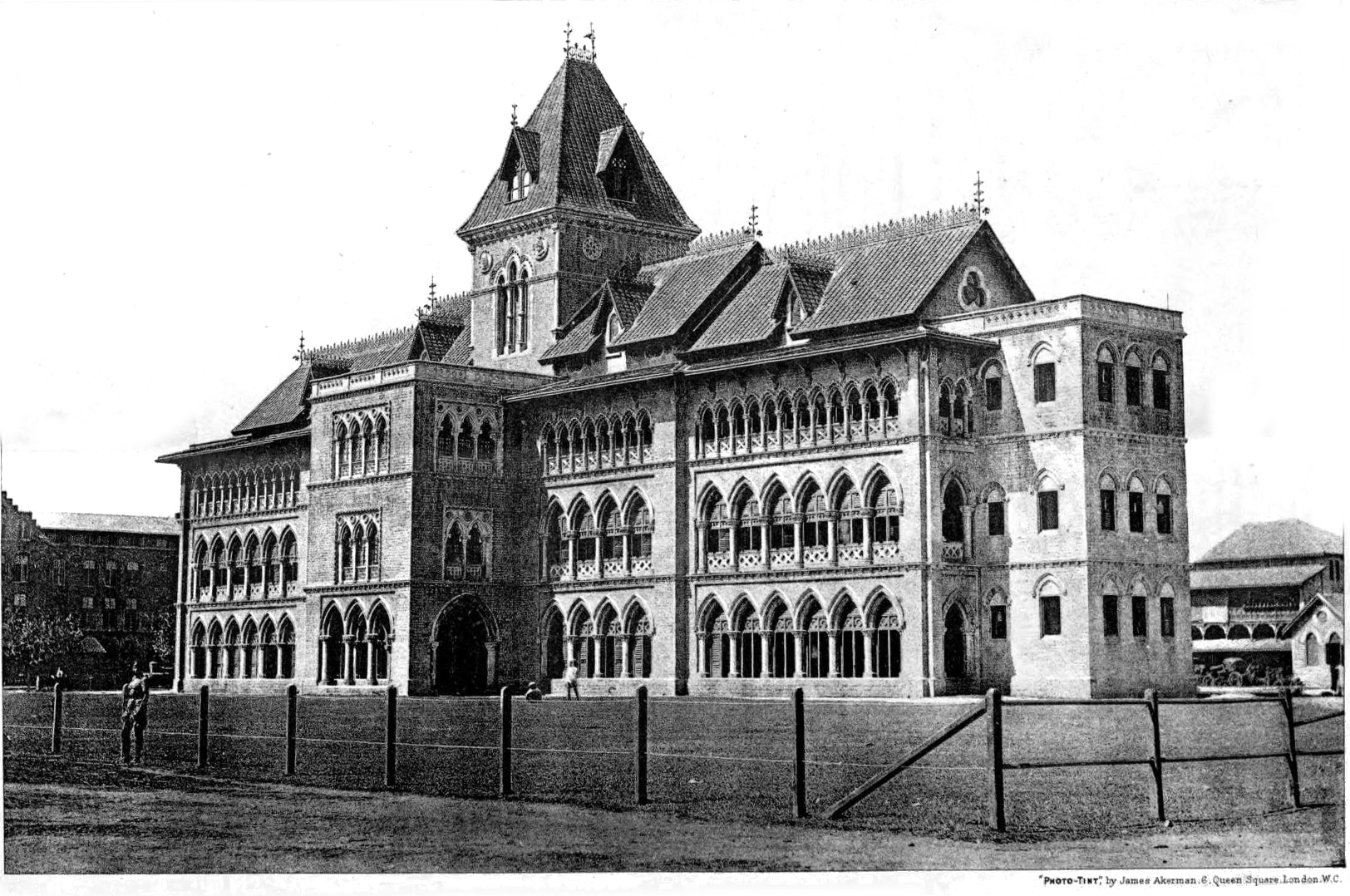
Gokuldas Tejpal Hospital. Bombay in 1887. Designed in early English Gothic style by Colonel Fuller. Blue basalt facings with arches of Kurla stone, paved with Minton's tiles and roofing with Taylor's patent tiles. Columns made of Kurla stone with caps of Porebunder stone.

In 1822, Gokuldas was born in Bhatia community. His father and his uncle began life at early age as hawkers in Bombay. His father, Tejpal, passed his fortune to Gokuldas in 1833 when he died. His uncle too left his own fortune to Gokuldas when he died. Gokuldas died in 1867 by leaving large amounts of money for charitable institutions, including a boarding school and several other schools.

== See also ==
- Bhau Daji
- Gokuldas Tejpal Hospital
- Karsandas Mulji
- Maharaj Libel Case
- Narmad
