= Satyaprakash =

Weekly publication (1855–1861)

- Editor: Karsandas Mulji
- Frequency: Weekly
- Founder: Karsandas Mulji
- First issue: 1855
- Final issue: 1861
- Country: British India
- Language: Gujarati

Satyaprakash (transl. The Light of Truth) was a Gujarati language weekly founded by social reformer and journalist Karsandas Mulji with an intention of social reform. Launched in 1855, it ran until 1861 and later was merged with Rast Goftar, another newspaper published in Bombay.

== History ==
Karsandas Mulji, a social reformer and journalist, previously wrote for the Rast Goftar and Stribodh magazines, but readership of these magazines were mostly limited to Parsis. He therefore established Satyaprakash in 1855 with the help of Mangalbhai Naththubhai. He edited it while Rustomji Ranina was the publisher. His articles addressed forward Hindu caste leaders and attacked social customs and religious practises. Mulji addressed various social issues such as female education, excessive spending in pompous marriages, indecent songs sung during marriages, and the funeral ritual of chest beating. The caste leaders were unhappy about these articles and tried to excommunicate Mulji from his Kapol Vaniya caste, but could not garner support from within the community. Satyaprakash merged with the Rast Goftar in 1861, and the merged entity continued publishing under the latter name until 1921.

== Notable articles ==
Among the notable articles which Mulji wrote for the weekly was one titled Gulamikhat (transl. Letter of slavery), in which he criticised the sign campaign and the process of law-making by Vaishnavas so that Maharaj (religious heads) should not have to visit the court due to religious status. After publication of the article, there were some attempts to appease Mulji with large amounts of money, but these failed. Following this incident, Mulji wrote a few articles—namely Maharajo ne vinanti (transl. Request to Maharaj) and Dharmguruo ni satta (transl. Power of religious leaders)—in which he openly expressed his anger. An article by Mulji published on 21 September 1860, titled Hinduo No Asli Dharam Ane Atyar Na Pakhandi Mato (lit. 'The Primitive Religion of the Hindus and the Present Heterodox Opinions'), criticised Vaishnava Archaryas (Hindu religious leaders) for their behaviour, which resulted in the Maharaj Libel Case in 1862.

== Reception ==
Vaishnava religious heads started publishing a pamphlet called Swadharmvardhak ane Sanshaychedak (transl. Increasing one's own faith and countering doubts). In the pamphlet, they labelled Mulji and other social reformers greedy, atheists, and idiots. In its response, Satyaprakash accused religious heads of being frauds and called their religious books poisonous. Jadunath Maharaj, Vaishnava religious head, wrote a fiery article in Chabuk and in the response, Mulji wrote Hinduo No Asli Dharam Ane Atyar Na Pakhandi Mato. Mulji's articles led to the Maharaj Libel Case, which Mulji won.

== See also ==
- List of Gujarati-language magazines
