= Phulchhab =

Indian newspaper

- Type: Daily
- Format: Print, online
- Founder: Janmabhoomi Media Group
- Publisher: Janmabhoomi Media Group
- Editor: Zaverchand Meghani, Himmat bhai Parekh, Harsukhbhai Sanghani
- Deputy editor: Vipul Rathod
- Founded: 1921; 105 years ago, as Saurashtra
- Political alignment: Centre-Left
- Language: Gujarati
- City: Rajkot, Gujarat
- Country: India
- Website: www.phulchhab.com
- Free online archives: www.phulchhab.com/epaper.aspx

Phulchhab is the Gujarati daily published from Rajkot, Gujarat, India. It was founded in 1921 as a Saurashtra weekly. Saurashtra newspaper shifted to Rajkot in 1950 and its name changed to Phulchhab. Zaverchand Meghani, Amritlal Sheth, Kakalbhai Kothari and many more dignities established truthful daily in Saurashtra region.

Mr. Zaverchand Meghani, Himmat bhai Parekh, Mr. Harsukhbhai Sanghani were the powerful editors of Phulchhab. The role of Phulchhab at the time before independence was very important. Phulchhab is a daily of Janmabhoomi Group of Newspapers. Its slogan is "Saurashtra ni Vichardhara". As of 2018, the Managing Editor is Mr. Kundanbhai Vyas, Editor is Kaushik Mehta and Manager is Narendra Ziba.

Mr. Vipul Rathod, the deputy editor of phulchhab is one of the youngest and dynamic deputy editor in this historic newspaper and he is well known for the most creative headlines in gujarati journalism history. since last 20 years he has been editor of front page of phulchhab.

== Columnists ==
- Nagindas Sanghvi
- Kajal Oza Vaidhya
- Sanjay Chhel
- Kundan Vyas
- Vipul Rathod
- Kaushik Mehta
- Bhadrayu Vachhrajani
- Soli Kapadiya
