= Doot (magazine) =

Gujarati Catholic magazine

Paavan Hriday Doot
- December 2010 issue
- Editor: Jaswant Macwan
- Co-editor: Jaswant Macwan
- Frequency: Monthly
- Circulation: around 5000
- Publisher: Gujarat Sahitya Prakash Society
- Founder: Hermanus Zurhausen
- Founded: January 1911; 115 years ago
- Country: India
- Based in: Anand, Gujarat
- Language: Gujarati

Doot or Paavan Hriday Doot is Gujarati Catholic monthly published from Anand, Gujarat, India since January 1911.

== History ==
The first issue was published by German Jesuit missionary Father Hermanus Zurhausen from the Examiner Press, Bombay (now Mumbai) in January 1911. The publication moved to Anand in 1926 where it is being published by Gujarati Sahitya Prakash Society. The cost of the first issue was two paisa which now increased to ₹ 100 annually.

The monthly published its centenary issue in December 2010, the second ever Gujarati magazine after Buddhiprakash. The commemorative postage stamps were released in January 2011.

The magazine has around 5000 subscribers.

== Controversy ==
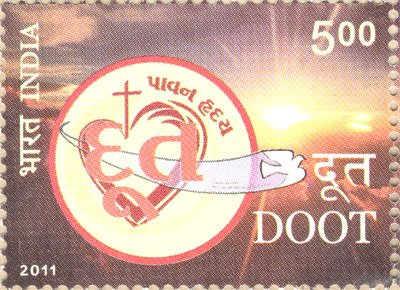
Stamp of India 2011 Centenary of Doot

The February 2012 issue published image of the Most Sacred Heart of Jesus holding a can of beer and cigarette. After controversy, the publisher apologized.

== See also ==
- Varghese Paul, an editor of Doot for 14 years
- List of Gujarati-language magazines
