= Haji Mohammed Allarakha Shivji =

Gujarati literary journalist and author (1878–1921)

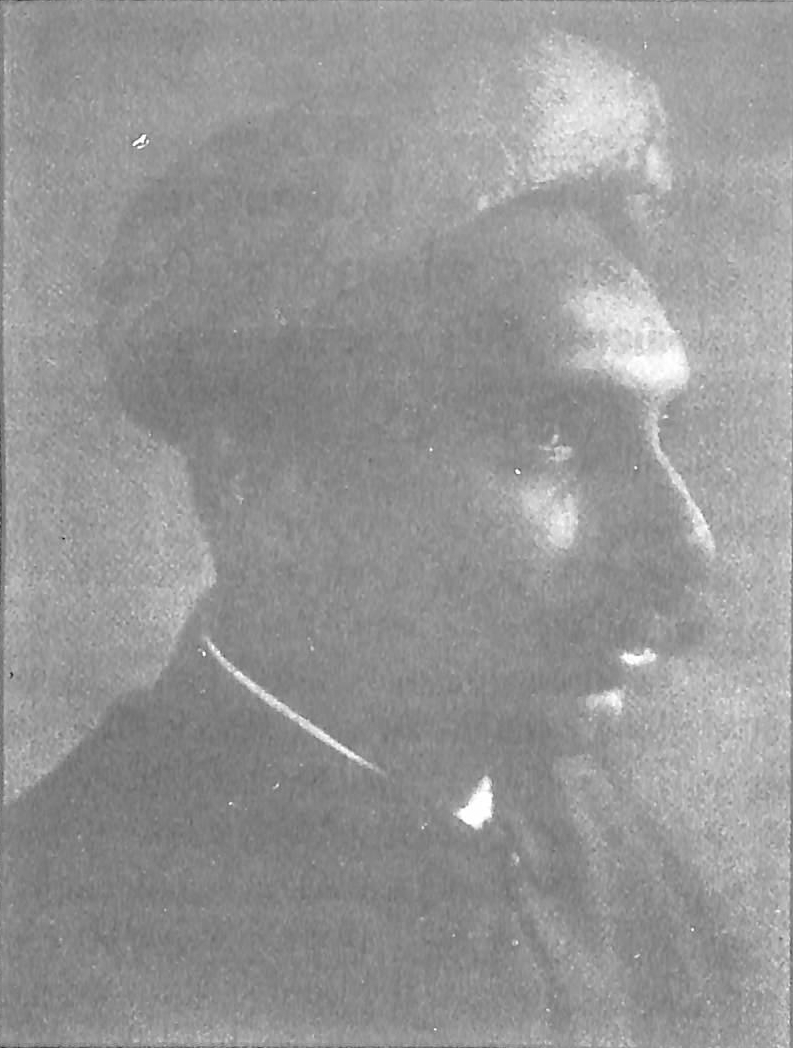
- Born: 13 December 1878; Bombay, British India
- Died: 21 January 1921 (aged 42); Bombay, British India
- Occupations: Journalist, writer
- Years active: 1914–1921
- Known for: Vismi Sadi periodical

Haji Mohammed Allarakha Shivji (13 December 1878 – 21 January 1921), also spelled Hajji Mohammad Alarakhiya, was a Gujarati literary journalist and author.

== Biography ==
Haji Mohammed Allarakha Shivji was born on 13 December 1878 in Bombay to a Khoja Ismaili businessman. He was a native of Kutch. He studied Gujarati initially at home, and later studied up to the sixth grade at Fort Highschool in Bombay. After 1895, he studied Hindi, English and Marathi. To bring magazine like The Strand Magazine in Gujarati, he founded Visami Sadi (The Twentieth Century), a pictorial periodical in 1914 and published it from 1916 to 1920. He sold three family mansions and invested around Rs 15 million for the magazine. It became popular but he never recovered any money from it. He was a connoisseur of art. He died in an accident in Bombay on 21 January 1921.

== Works ==
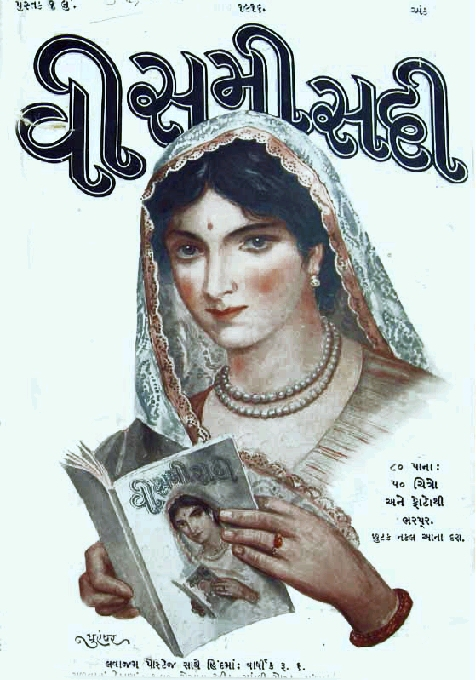
Cover of 1916 issue of Visami Sadi. Cover Art by M. V. Dhurandhar.

Allarakha is best known for his periodical Visami Sadi. He wrote and translated several works under pen name, Salim. Mogal Rang Mahel and Shish Mahel are his stories. Meharunnisa athwa Shahenshah Jahangir ane Noorjahan no Prem (1904) is his play with Urdu shayaris. Rashida (1908) is his novel.

Suchet Singh established Oriental Film Manufacturing Company of Bombay with help of Allarakha in 1919.

== See also ==
- List of Gujarati-language writers
