= Janmabhoomi (Gujarati newspaper) =

Indian Gujarati-language daily newspaper

જન્મભૂમિ (Janmabhoomi)
- Type: Daily Evening newspaper
- Format: Broadsheet
- Founder: Amrutlal Sheth
- Publisher: Saurastra Trust
- Editor: Kundan Vyas.
- Founded: 9 June 1934
- Language: Gujarati
- Headquarters: Mumbai, India
- Website: janmabhoominewspapers.com
- Free online archives: janmabhoominewspapers.com/ePaper.aspx

Janmabhoomi (જન્મભૂમિ) is an Indian Gujarati-language evening daily newspaper, owned by the Saurashtra Trust. It is headquartered in Mumbai, Maharastra. Janmabhoomi was launched in 1934 as an evening paper The newspaper publishes 10-12 pages every day, including an editorial page and an op-ed page. The motto of the newspaper is 'जननी जन्मभूमिश्च स्वर्गादपि गरीयसी' (Mother and motherland are superior to Heaven).

== History ==
Janmabhoomi was founded by Indian freedom fighter Amritlal Sheth, who also founded Saurashtra Trust in 1931. Initially, Amrithal created an English language paper named The Sun, which performed poorly. On 9 June 1934, Amritlal started publishing Janmabhoomi in Gujarati as a nationalist publication. The paper was supportive of Gandhism and instituted a policy of avoiding sensationalist journalism. Jhaverchand Meghani, a popular Gujarati nationalist poet, has been connected to the paper since its inception. Initially, the paper became the face of the movement against the oppression of the Kathiawar Princely States. By covering news of the Burma Campaign and stories relating to the Indian National Army (Azad Hind fauj), the paper reached national status. In 1979, the newspaper started a morning edition under the name Pravasi. On Sundays, the newspaper's morning and evening editions are published together under the consolidated masthead Janmabhoomi Pravasi.

In the 1970s, the newspaper had a circulation of 45,000 to 50,000 copies. During the 1980s, circulation dropped to 40,000. The first feminist Novel of Gujarati Batris Putalini Vedatiya by Ila Arab Mehta was popularized in a Sunday edition of the paper. Another feminist Novel Saat Pagla Aakashamaa written by Kundanika Kapadia also gained attention from the paper.

== Editors ==
Editors in chief of the Janmabhoomi Group of Newspapers have included Kakalbhai Kothari, Harindra Dave and Kanti Bhatt (1967-1977).
