= Gokuldas Tejpal Hospital =

Hospital in Mumbai, India

Coordinates: 18.944614°N 72.831405°E

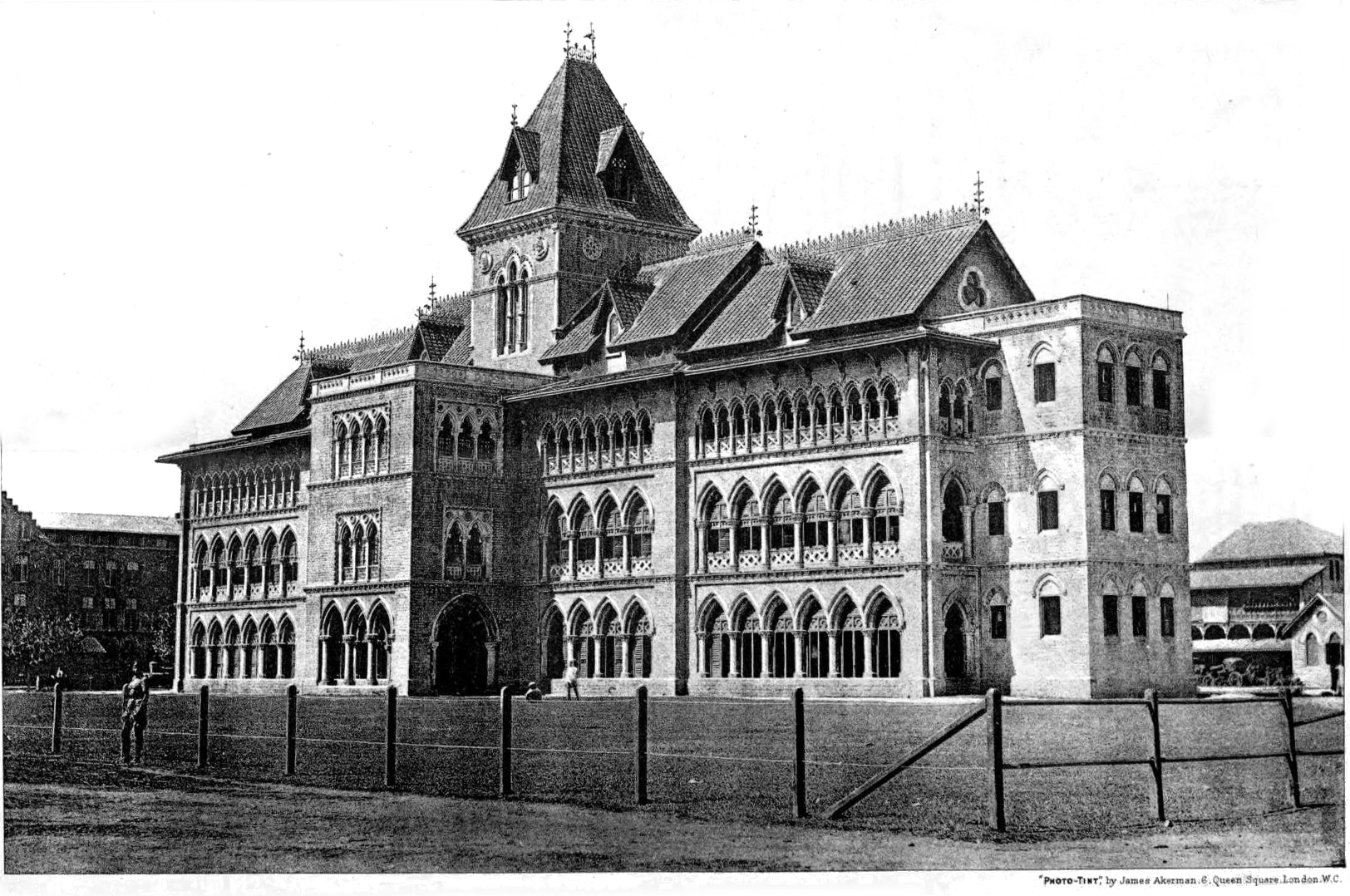
Hospital building in 1888

Gokuldas Tejpal Hospital is a government of Maharashtra run free hospital in South Mumbai, India. It was built in 1875 thanks to the beneficence of Gokuldas Tejpal, a renowned Hindu businessman and philanthropist of Mumbai.

Rustomjee Jamsetjee Jeejeebhoy offered £15,000 for the construction of a native hospital in 1865 if the government would put in £10,000. A financial crisis however led to Rustomjee being unable to follow it. Arthur Crawford helped obtain the £15,000 from Gokuldas Tejpal and getting the government to build it. The building work began on 10 May 1870 and was completed on 8 April 1874. The original building was designed in early English Gothic style by Colonel Fuller. It used blue basalt facings with arches of Kurla stone, was paved with Minton's tiles and roofing with Taylor's patent tiles. Columns made of Kurla stone with caps of Porebunder stone.

The current Gokuldas Tejpal Hospital has its old and new buildings. A new hospital was being built to be privatised but the project ran into problems due to land ownership issues and is currently being contested with the building works being completely shut down.
