= Maharaj libel case =

1862 trial in Bombay Court

- Court: Supreme Court of Bombay
- Full case name: Jadunath Brijratanjee Maharaj v. Karsandas Mulji and Nanabhai Rustomji Ranina
- Started: 14 May 1861
- Decided: April 22, 1862
- Verdict: Plaintiff awarded ₹5; defendant awarded ₹ 11,500 in costs

Court membership
- Chief judge: Chief Justice Matthew Richard Sausse
- Associate judges: Justice Joseph Arnould

The Maharaj libel case was an 1862 trial in the Supreme Court of Bombay, in British India. The case was initiated by Jadunath Brajratanjee Maharaj against Nanabhai Rustomji Ranina and Karsandas Mulji. It stemmed from an editorial article they had published, which accused the Vallabhacharya and Pushtimarg Sect of certain alleged controversial practices by their leaders.

In the 19th century, Pushtimarg encountered attacks from three different fronts. Christian missionaries found it challenging to convert and condemned the tradition's rituals as particularly primitive. Orientalist scholars of Hinduism criticized Pushtimarg as a relatively recent and inauthentic tradition. Reformist intellectuals such as Mulji viewed Pushtimarg as a stereotypical "cult" that kept its followers entrenched in backwardness and superstition. These accusations ultimately coalesced into claims that the Maharajs in Bombay were abusing their female followers under the pretext of reenacting the love between the young Krishna and the milk maidens called Gopis. Jadunath Maharaj, a staunch defender of Pushtimarg, engaged in renowned public debates with Mulji. However, when Mulji published his scathing article in the newspaper Satyaprakash, titled "Hinduo No Asli Dharam Ane Atyar Na Pakhandi Mato" the Maharaj took legal action against him.

== Background ==
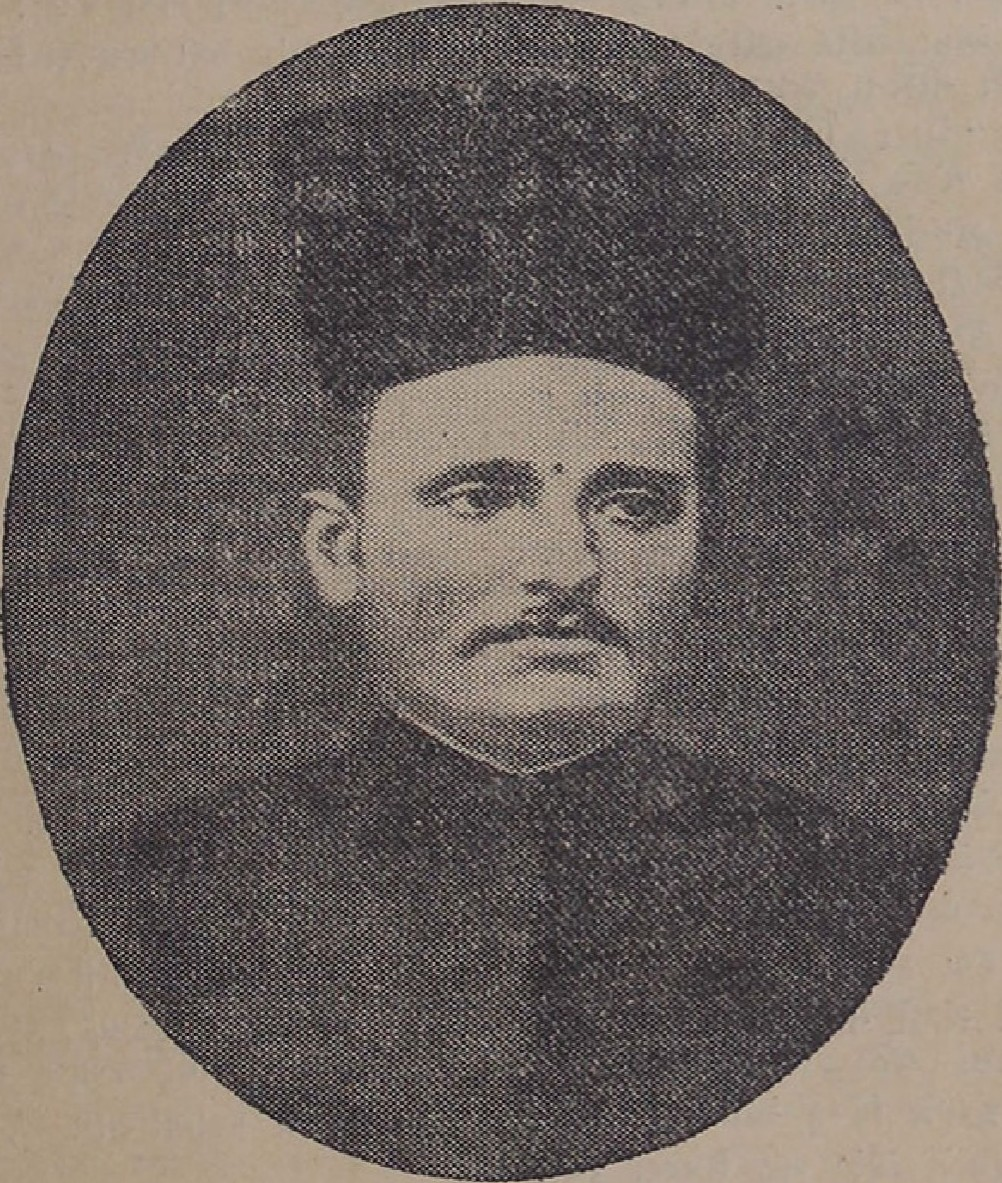
Karsandas Mulji (1832–1871)

In the article "Hinduo No Asli Dharam Ane Atyar Na Pakhandi Mato", Karsandas Mulji questioned the values of a Hindu sect called the Pushtimarg or Vallabha Sampradaya. The article was claimed to be libellous by the plaintiff. In particular were accusations that Jadunath had sexual liaisons with women followers and that men were expected to show their devotion by offering their female family members for sex with the religious leaders.

Jadunath was a religious leader of the Vaishnavite Pushtimarg sect of Hinduism. The sect was founded in the 16th century by Vallabha and worships Krishna as the supreme being. The leadership of the sect remained with Vallabha's direct male descendants, who possess the titles of maharaja. Theologically, Vallabha and his descendants are accorded partial divinity as mediating figures for Krishna's grace who can render Krishna's presence immediately to the devotee.

The Pushtimarg's followers in Gujarat, Kathiyawad, Kutch, and central India were rich merchants, bankers, and farmers, including the Bhatia, Lohana, and Baniya castes. Many of these mercantile groups migrated to Bombay under British rule as the city was the political and financial capital of western India. The merchant groups were headed by merchant-princes or seṭhs who were heavily involved in the political and cultural milieu of Bombay. The seṭhs, despite their general lack of education, ignorance of the English language, and British political traditions were influential in Bombay society as leaders of business communities and maintainers of cultural honour.

By the mid-nineteenth century, the British had established political control over the Indian subcontinent and sought to create an administrative-legal framework to manage their colonial interests. British officials sought to compile Indian legal doctrines and apply them to British common law, effectively stripping native groups of civil and criminal self-governance in favour of a unified legal system. This desire to produce legal codes spawned the Orientalist school of Indology, whose grand narrative of Indian history was that of a decline from an ancient golden age into a degenerate, superstitious modern society. The British established schools and colleges that would educate new generations of Anglicized Indians who would be supportive of social reforms. These institutions created a new class of urban English-speaking Indian professionals who claimed to be superior leaders of society than the seṭhs due to their intricate knowledge of the British administrative machinery. These English-speaking professionals joined various religious reform movements that concurred with the Orientalist view of modern Indian religion, and especially opposed the seṭhs for their role in so-called excessive religious patronage.

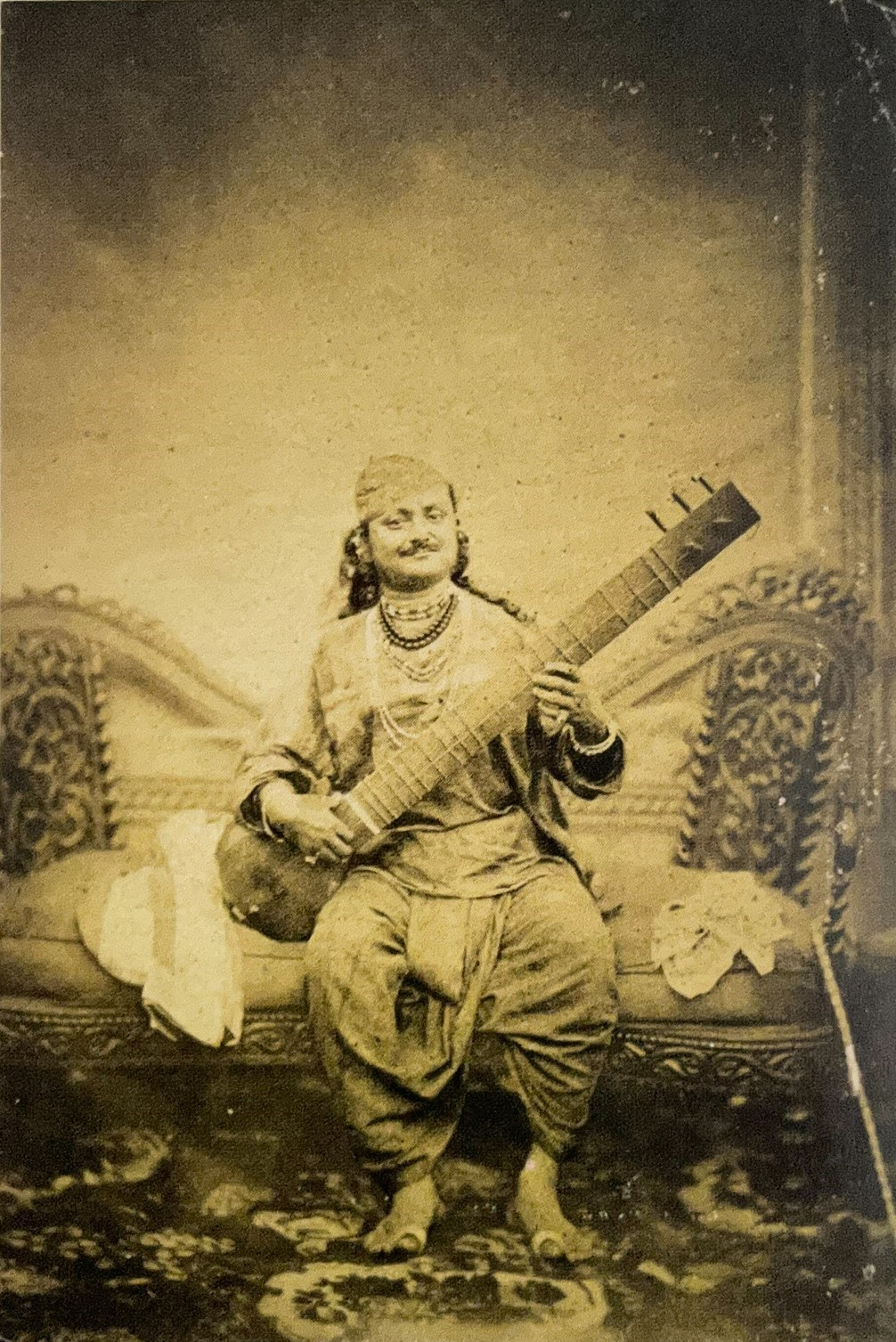
Goswami Jivanlal of Mumbai playing the sitar.

The Pushtimarg religious leaders, known as maharajas, settled in Bombay in the 19th century. Karsandas Mulji, a reformist from an orthodox Pushtimarg family, criticized the maharajas for alleged sexual misconduct. Allegations against the maharajas became public in 1855, leading to a clash between the reformers and the senior-most maharaja, Jivanlal. Jivanlal attempted to silence Pushtimarg critics by threatening excommunication. Mulji responded by publishing a work claiming Pushtimarg was a heretical sect that mistreated women. The Bombay maharajas then brought in Jadunath Brijratan, a prominent maharaja from Surat, to publicly debate Mulji and other reformers.

Eventually, Jadunath Maharaj filed a libel case in the Bombay Supreme Court on 14 May 1861 against Karsandas Mulji, editor of Satyaprakash, a Gujarati weekly newspaper, and its publisher Nanabhai Rustomji Ranina, for defaming the plaintiff in an article published on 21 October 1860.

== Case and judgement ==
The defense's lawyers sought to have the case thrown out on the argument that Mulji's comments did not attack Jadunath personally but rather as a religious leader, and that a secular court did not have jurisdiction over religious matters. These attempts failed, and the British judges stated Jadunath had the right to defend his reputation in court, but that the case would give no value to Jadunath's status as a religious leader nor to Pushtimarg theology, but rather Jadunath would be treated as an ordinary citizen of the British empire whose actions would be viewed through the British laws of universal morality.

Jadunath continued to use his traditional means of authority to defeat Mulji and ordered the seths to ensure the loyalty of devotees. In one instance Bhatia seṭhs (including Gokuldas Lilahadhar) convened a meeting of two hundred people of their caste to further this aim. This meeting came to the attention of the British Supreme Court, which resulted in the Bhatia Conspiracy case in which the seṭhs were convicted of mass witness tampering and forced to pay fines to the court. That case made public the divisions growing in the devotional community over the status of the maharajas and their loyalty to them.

As modern scholars have argued, the Maharaj had already lost the case before the court started to convene. The British court relied on missionaries and Orientalist scholars as experts. The main expert witness was Dr. John Wilson, both a missionary and an Orientalist, who has been "actively engaged in criticizing the contemporary forms of Hindu culture in the vicinity of Bombay since the early 1830s".

== Plaintiff's case ==
Thirty-five witnesses were called by Jadunath's side to serve as character witnesses, all from mercantile castes and including several seṭhs. The devotee witnesses did their best to defend Jadunath with the limited theological knowledge they possessed, but none knew Sanskrit or Braj Bhasha and were not fully versed in Pushtimarg history. One notable witness, Gopaldas Madhavdas, stated he did not know of any sexual immoralities conducted by Jadunath or any other Maharaj, and stated they were highly honoured religious leaders of the merchant communities. Gopaldas viewed and venerated the maharajas as gurus rather than Krishna, but stated that others in the community did view the maharajas as incarnations of Krishna. Another witness, Jamunadas Sevaklal, gave a similar testimony stating he did not know immoralities or sexual orgies of the maharajas, and stated the maharajas in his view were gurus who were the representations of Krishna although others worshipped them as gods. When Gopaldas and Jamunadas were directly questioned on whether the maharajas were gods or humans, they were confused and could not provide definite answers.

Jadunath himself took the stand and claimed knowledge of Sanskrit, Braj Bhasha, and Gujarati, but then later stated he had never actually read any Braj Bhasha Pushtimarg text. When asked about certain texts that supported the veneration of maharajas, Jadunath stated he was personally unfamiliar with those texts and at one point in the trial claimed the Shrinathji Temple was in Kankroli rather than Nathdwara. Jadunath stated that the maharajas were simply mortal spiritual guides and that only their ancestor Vallabha was an incarnation of Krishna. He stated that the veneration the maharajas received was per Hindu scriptures and that only the maharajas could directly worship the Krishna images, so devotees would worship the maharajas. He denied all sexual allegations relating to him and any other maharaja, stating the adulterous love of Krishna and the gopis in Vrindavan was merely a metaphor for the relationship between devotees and Krishna, not an endorsement of infidelity.

== Defense's case ==
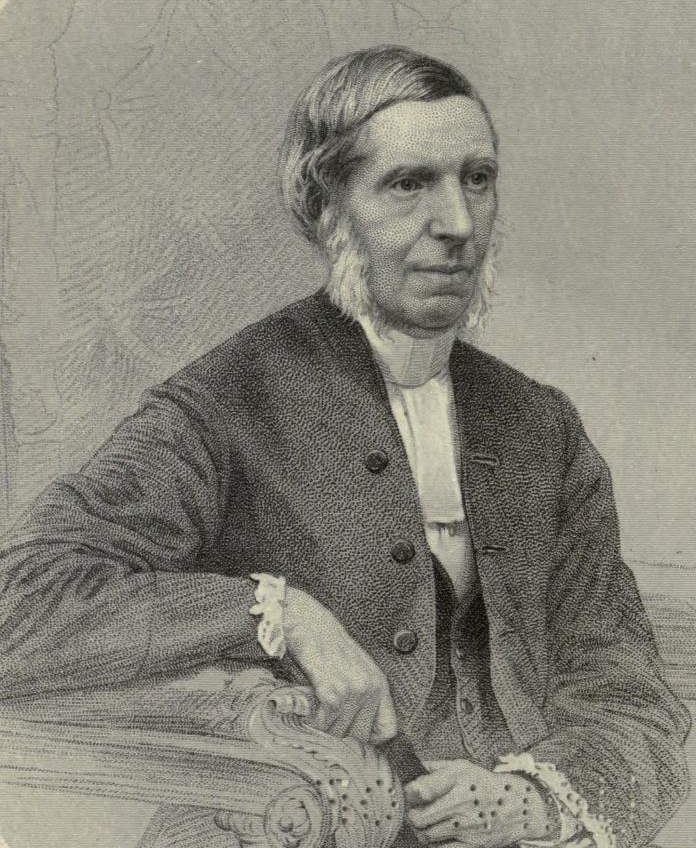
Engraving of John Wilson

Karsandas Mulji himself took the stand and stated the maharajas were oppressive leaders who encouraged sexual debauchery. He stated that Jadunath should rather be sued for libel, given his public attacks against Mulji. Mulji restated his earlier claims that the Pushtimarg was not the "true" Hinduism of the Vedic age, but rather a heretic sect that encouraged devotees to hand over their wives and daughters for the maharajas' pleasure.

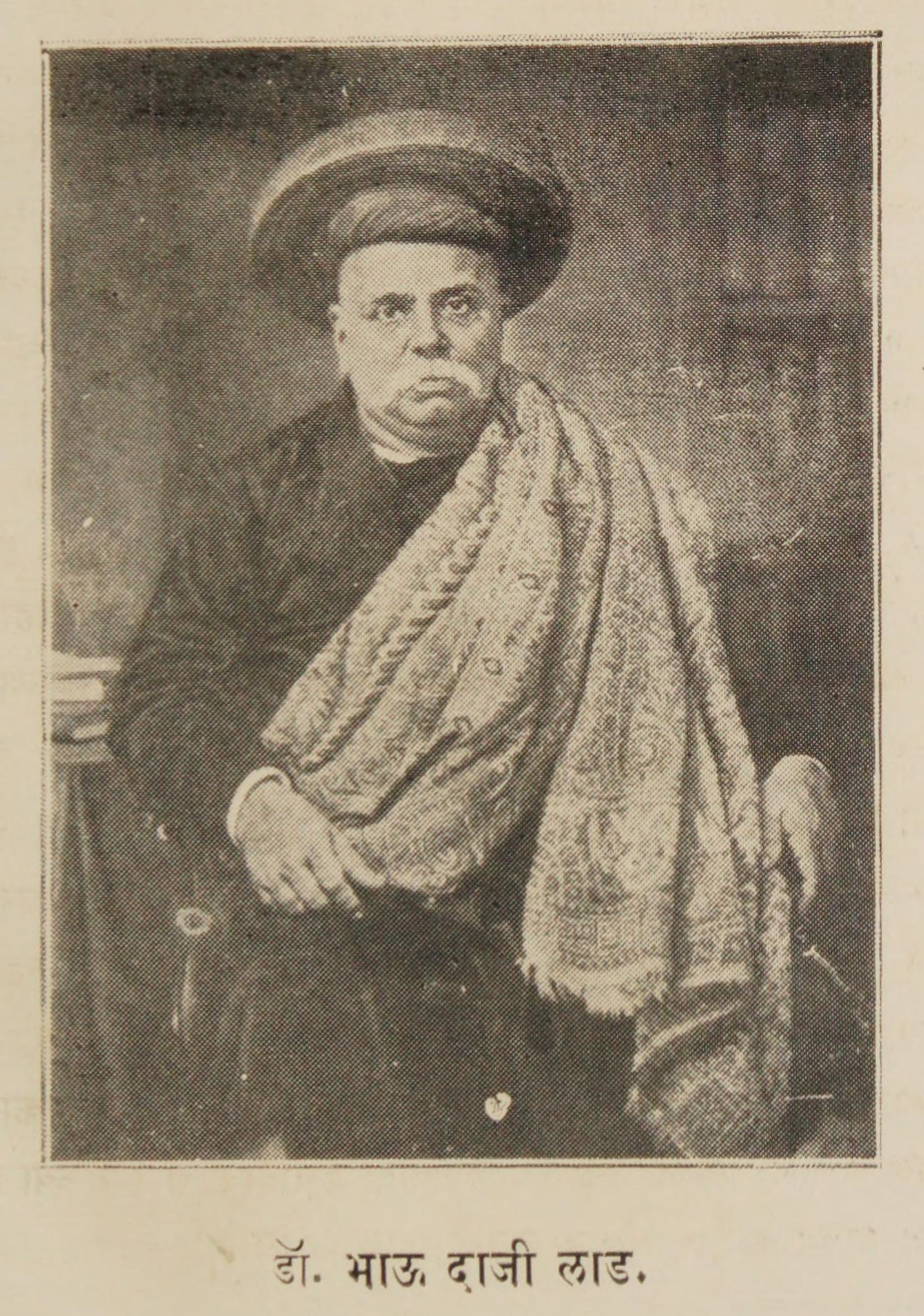
Image of Bhau Daji

A missionary, Reverend John Wilson, also took the stand. Wilson claimed knowledge of Sanskrit and Old Hindi as well as the Vedas, Puranas, and Shastras, and was thus sent by the defense as an authority on Hinduism. Wilson, however was not intimately familiar with the Pushtimarga and referred to Professor H. H. Wilson's works on the sect. He criticized the maharajas for the practice of lavish seva to Krishna, which he stated was in opposition to the asceticism of "true" Hinduism. He stated the maharajas were uneducated spiritual leaders who were worshipped as incarnations of Krishna solely due to their genealogical descent from Vallabha, and that their religious scriptures sanctioned the offering of devotees' wives and daughters to them. Although presented as "neutral" expert, John Wilson had since the 1830s been a public anti-Hindu polemicist. Thus his authority in court relied on his Edinburg university education and associations with European learning societies, all of which promoted a powerful aura of "Western science and rationality".

Two expert witnesses were also brought to the stand, Bhau Daji and Dhiraj Dalpatram, who were physicians to Jadunath. They said that they had treated Jadunath and other maharajas for syphilis, which they stated was due to sexual relations with female devotees. Dalpatram even stated that Jadunath had himself admitted to him that he had caught the disease from a female devotee.

Other witnesses, such as Mathuradas Lowjee, supported the physician's testimonies. Lowjee was a member of the Pushtimarg, but ever since sexual allegations against the maharajas became public in 1855, he kept his distance from the maharajas and refused to venerate them all the while maintaining his theological commitment to the sect. He stated that Pushtimarg devotees, including members of his own Bhatia caste, viewed the maharajas as literal incarnations of Krishna. He stated senior members of the caste had "Ras Mandalis", which re-enacted the dances between Krishna and the gopis. He stated he once stumbled upon a maharaja having sexual intercourse with a female devotee. When Lowjee asked Jivanlal to stop the maharajas illicit behaviour, Jivanlal told him that he could not due to the powerful addiction of male sexual desire, as well as the fact that women's donations were a major source of financial income for the sect.

Lakhmidas Khimji confirmed Lowjee's testimony, stating he once observed Jadunath grope the breasts of a fourteen-year-old girl and later stumbled upon Jadunath having sexual intercourse with her. Khimji stated on a few occasions that he observed a widow companion of Jadunath procure married women for his sexual pleasure. Kalabhai Lalubhai also claimed Jadunath had sexual relations with women and girls as young as fourteen.

== Judgement ==
=== Justice Arnould ===
Justice Joseph Arnould ruled in favour of Mulji. Arnould was particularly influenced by Reverend Wilson's and Bhau Daji's testimonies. Arnould stated that Mulji's comments in Satyaprakash were not false and did not specifically attack Jadunath. Arnould agreed that the Pushtimarg was a degraded sect of Hinduism that promoted debauchery and loose morals. He stated Mulji did nothing wrong in exposing the "evil and barbarous" practices of the maharajas.

=== Chief Justice Sausse ===
Chief Justice Matthew Richard Sausse was the senior of the two judges in the case, and overruled Arnould's judgement to find Mulji guilty of libel. Sausse was also greatly impressed by the defense's witnesses, which in his view affirmed the defendant's claim that the Pushtimarg was a heterodox sect and that Jadunath engaged in salacious behaviour. However, Sausse ruled that Mulji took a private dispute within the Pushtimarg and published his grievances in a public newspaper, which was a form of malice. Sausse stated Mulji attacked Jadunath publicly without provocation, and that even if the sexual allegations against Jadunath were true, they were a private matter and newspapers could not attack people on private matters without public interest. Nevertheless, Sausse suspected the reliability of Jadunath and his witnesses' testimonies and only awarded him five rupees on the libel charge. Sausse sided with the defendants on the pleas that the Pushtimarg was a heterodox sect and agreed that the defendant's publications were true, and awarded Mulji eleven thousand five hundred rupees.

== Reaction ==
The Maharaj Libel Case tried in HM Queen Victoria's Supreme Court of Bombay was hailed at the time as “the most extraordinary of any case tried in any of Her Majesty’s Courts in India” (The Indian Reformer, June 6, 1862, quoted in Mulji 1865, pp. App. 163). It was covered daily by the media in India and even in Europe as one of the trials of the century in British India. The libel case stirred unprecedented interest in the public. Karsandas Mulji's efforts and the court decision received praise from the liberals and the press. For his part, Mulji was cited by the local English press as 'Indian Luther', after the Christian reformer Martin Luther.

During and after the case, Pushtimarg devotees struggled to come to terms with the sexual allegations against the maharajas. Generally, devotees continued to have social contact with the maharajas as their religious leaders. In the next two decades however, some merchant devotees in Bombay built new temples and theological journals independent of the maharajas.

Karsandas Mulji is said to have written a book called "The Sect of the Maharajas", which was published in 1865. This work does not contain his name as its author, but is, however, attributed to him. It is said to have been revised thoroughly by an “English friend” of his, who was perhaps no other than Dr. Wilson. In all probability, it was the latter who had much to do with its origin as well as publication. It is written on the lines of the defence made by Karsondas in the Maharaj Libel Case, painting the entire sampradaya of Vallabhacharya in the darkest of colours. It is altogether negative and destructive the sole purpose of the alleged author or the man behind him being to discredit the movement as much as possible. The book bears on it unmistakably the mark of missionary mentality, and was written and used for the purpose of showing Hinduism in one of its worst aspects. It became an important weapon in the armoury of missionary propaganda concerning the people of India, helping to show them up as stricken with ‘moral plague’.

In 1875, Dayananda Saraswati came to Bombay and attacked the Pushtimarg on similar lines as Mulji, calling it a heterodox sect with false religious leaders who contradicted "true" Hinduism.

== In popular culture ==
In April 2021, a book titled "Doctrines of Pushtibhaktimarga: Allegations, Conspiracies and Facts" was published. The book was authored by multiple generational practitioners of Pushtimarg, most prominently Dhawal Patel, Pratyush Mehrishi, and Maitri Goswami. It aimed to demystify the misconceptions regarding the true and essential characteristics of Pushtimarga, in light of the allegations presented in court during the Maharaj Libel case of 1862 A.D.

Saurabh Shah, a Gujarati author and journalist, wrote a novel titled Maharaj based on the case which was awarded the Nandshankar award by the Narmad Sahitya Sabha.

Netflix's 2024 period drama film Maharaj, directed by Siddharth P. Malhotra and produced by Aditya Chopra under YRF Entertainment, starring Aamir Khan’s son Junaid Khan (in his debut) and Jaideep Ahlawat, is based on the Maharaj Libel Case and Saurabh Shah's novel. The Gujarat High Court stayed the release of the film, based on a Hindu group's plea that claimed the film could incite violence against followers of Pushtimarga Sampradaya. It was finally released on 21 June 2024 for streaming on Netflix.

== Sources ==
- Saha, Shandip (2004). Creating a Community of Grace: A History of the Puṣṭi Mārga in Northern and Western India (1493-1905) (Thesis). University of Ottawa.
- Lütt, Jürgen (1987). "Max Weber and the Vallabhacharis". International Sociology. 2 (3): 277–287. doi:10.1177/026858098700200305. S2CID 143677162.
- Scott, J. Barton (2015). "How to Defame a God: Public Selfhood in the Maharaj Libel Case". South Asia: Journal of South Asian Studies. 38 (3): 387–402. doi:10.1080/00856401.2015.1050161. hdl:1807/95441. S2CID 143251675.
- Haberman, David L. (1993-08-01). "On Trial: The Love of the Sixteen Thousand Gopees". History of Religions. 33 (1): 44–70. doi:10.1086/463355. ISSN 0018-2710. S2CID 162268682.
- Thakkar, Usha (4 January 1997). "Puppets on the Periphery-Women and Social Reform in 19th Century Gujarati Society". Economic and Political Weekly. 32 (1–2). Mumbai: 46–52. ISSN 0012-9976.(subscription required)
- Doctrines of Pushtibhaktimarga: A True representation of the views of Sri Vallabhacharya: In the context of Maharaj Libel Case https://play.google.com/store/books/details?id=yqIqEAAAQBAJ
