= Karsandas Mulji =

Indian journalist (1832–1871)

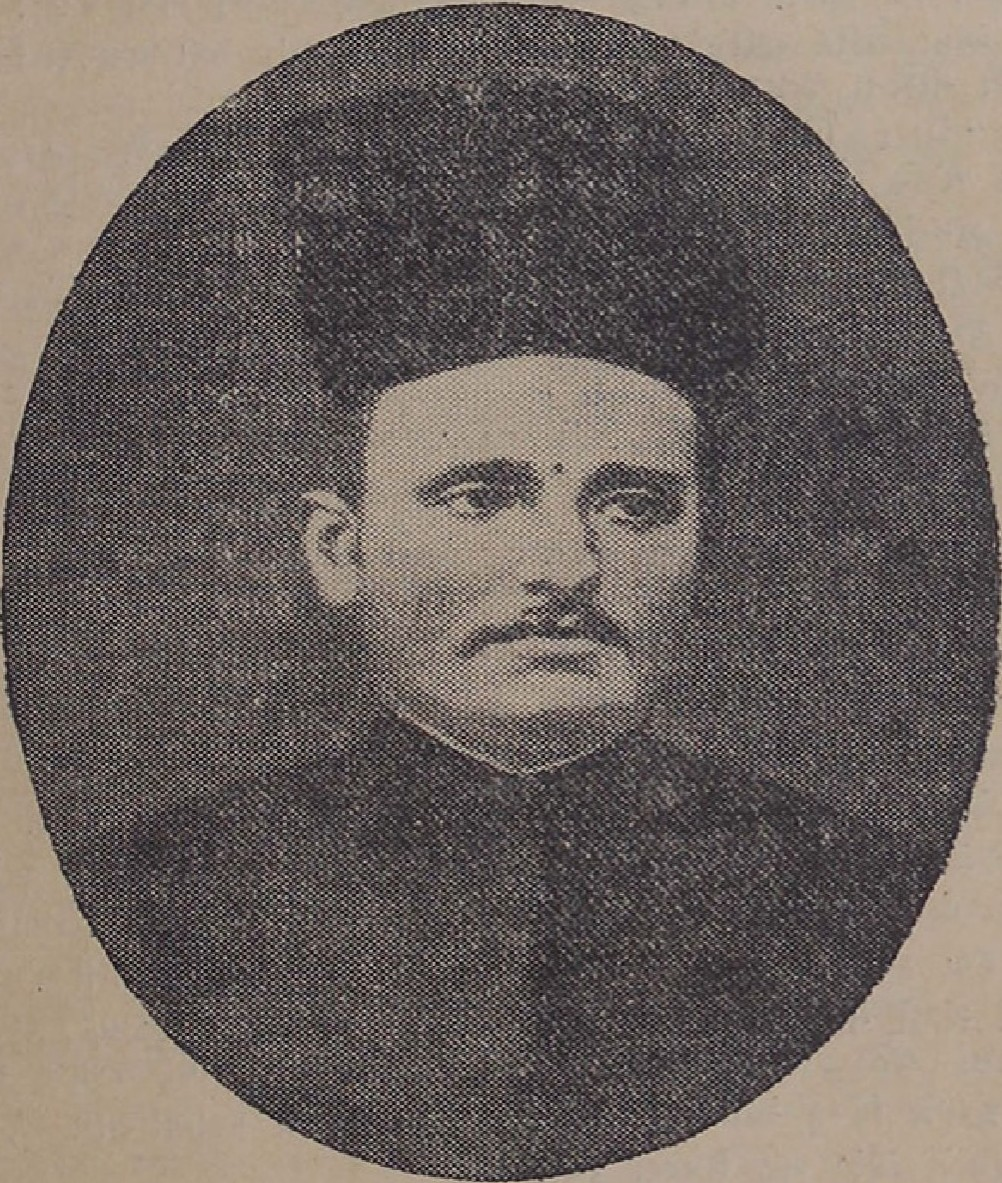
- Karsandas Mulji
- Born: 25 July 1832; Vadal, Near Mahuva, Bhavnagar, Gujarat
- Died: 28 August 1871 (aged 39); Kathiwara State, British India
- Education: Elphinstone College
- Occupation: Editor
- Notable work: Satyaprakash

Karsandas Mulji (25 July 1832 – 28 August 1871) was an Indian journalist, social reformer, administrator and statesman. He is also regarded as one of the founding members of the Indian National Congress who laid a base for the foundation of the Congress party.

He was an alumnus of Elphinstone college and an English-educated Gujarati journalist with an acute dislike for institutional religion.

Karsandas Mulji was appointed by the Victoria's British India's Bombay Government to administer the state of Kathiawar in 1867.

== Family and social background ==
Born to a Gujarati Vaishnav and Kapol bania family. He was raised by his mother's aunt after he lost his mother when he was quite young. Karsandas attended Elphinstone College for his education and took part in Gnan Prasarak Mandal's events. Karsandas started working as a journalist in 1851, when Dadabhai Naoroji created the Anglo-Gujarati Newspaper Rast Goftar. He was later repudiated by his family because of his views on widow remarriage. After a visit to England on business in connection with the cotton trade, which was not successful and brought on him excommunication from his caste because of the notion prevalent at those times regarding crossing the seas.

== Professional life ==
Mulji used to previously write for the Rast Goftar and Stribodh magazines, but readership of these magazines were mostly limited to Parsis. Narmadashankar Lalshankar, popularly known as Narmad, Mahipatram Rupram and Karsandas Mulji were members of Buddhivardhak Sabha. He was a nominated Fellow of the University of Bombay. He was also a member of the Royal Asiatic Society of Great Britain and Ireland.

Unhappy with the limited readership of these magazines, with the help of Mangalbhai Naththubhai, Mulji in the year 1855 founded a Gujarati newspaper named Satyaprakash targeting strictly conventional orthodox people. He edited it while Rustomji Ranina was the publisher. However Satyprakash was published for merely six years before closing in 1861 and latter dissolving into Rast Goftar, the same newspaper which he had previously left due to its lesser audience. His articles addressed forward caste leaders and attacked immoral social customs and practices. Mulji addressed various social issues such as female education, excessive money spending in pompous weddings, wedding ceremonies, and the funeral ritual of chest beating.

== Biographies ==
Mahipatram Rupram Nilkanth wrote his biography in Gujarati entitled Uttam Kapol Karsandas Mulji Charitra (1877) with an introductory sketch in English. Karsandas Mulji: A Biographical Study (1935) is another critical biography written by B. N. Motiwala.

== Death ==
His death was recorded in Chisholm (1911) as August 1875, but some other sources give 1871. Karsandas Mulji Municipal Library Matheran is named after him.

== In popular culture ==
His biopic titled Maharaj was released in 2024. In his film, Siddharth P. Malhotra dramatises the historic Maharaj libel case of 1862, in which imperial British justices mediate a dispute between progressive reform and religious conservatism in a subject country. In the film he is portrayed by Junaid Khan.

== See also ==
- Indian Social Reformer
- Dadabhai Naoroji
- Dalpatram
- Buddhi Vardhak Sabha
- Reform movements
- People from Bombay Presidency
