= Jogi (writer) =

Indian writer, journalist (16 November 1965)

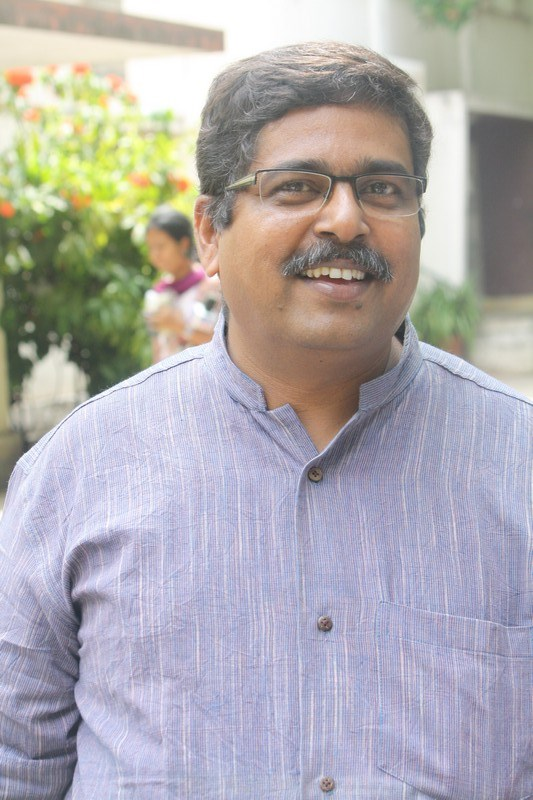
- Girish Rao Hatwar (Jogi)
- Born: Girish Rao Hatwar; 16 November 1965 (age 60); Hosabettu, India
- Occupations: Journalist, Kannada Prabha
- Writing career
- Pen name: Jogi
- Genres: Short stories, Poetry, Novels, Columns, Criticism
- Subjects: Karnataka, Rural life, Urban life, Spirituality
- Literary movement: Neo-literature

Girish Rao Hatwar, popularly known as Jogi, is a Kannada writer and journalist. Being one of the Kannada neo-literature writers, he has written short stories, novels and columns in many Kannada periodicals and daily newspapers. He has also written scripts for television serials, lyrics and screen play for movies. A journalist by profession, Jogi is currently a Magazine Editor of Kannada Prabha daily.

== Early life ==
Born in an agricultural family in Hosabettu near Suratkal in Mangaluru district, Jogi studied in Guruvayankere and Uppinangadi. Elder brother Hatwar Narayana Rao made name in Karnataka rural folk world by writing Yakshagana episodes and as a narrator in Thala Maddale.

Jogi, who started writing at the age of 18, completed his B.Com. in Puttur. In 1989, as Girish Rao Hatwar, he came to Bangalore and was transformed as Jogi by the then editor of Kannada Prabha – Y N Krishnamurthy, popularly known as YNK.

== Career ==
Jogi started by writing a column Bollywood 'Gha'sip in Kannada Prabha. He wrote a column called Ravi Kanaddu in Hi Bangalore, a Kannada weekly and later joined as its assistant editor. Jogi worked as editor of a monthly magazine Acchari. Jogi, Janaki, Girish Rao Hatwar, H Girish Rao, Sathyavratha Hosabeettu were some of his pen names and later worked as Associate Magazine Editor in Kannada Prabha. He gained popularity as movie and book reviewer and slowly started writing stories. Later, he started writing novels also.

Jogi wrote a series for young adults. Titled as Life is beautiful, six books have been published under this series. His novel Ashwatthaman, which has a film actor as central character, has received positive reviews.

Along with journalism and literature activities, Jogi wrote dialogues to Kannada television serials. Jogi wrote the script and dialogue of the movie Mouni, which is based on a novel by U. R. Ananthamurthy. Kaada Beladingalu written by Jogi was adapted as a movie and it bagged Karnataka State Film Awards 2006-07 in the categories of best social film and best story.

Jogi's stories were published in Mayura, Taranga, Tushara, Sudha, O Manase magazines, as well as Kannada Prabha and Prajavani newspapers. He also wrote Essays to Lankesh Patrike in the name of H Girish. He used to write book reviews under pseudo names and was also in charge of Roopatara being published under Manipal group. As of 2022, he is working as Chief Magazine Editor of Kannada Prabha.

Jogi has started a literary group Half Circle in Club House.

== Bibliography ==
=== Novels ===
- Nadiya Nenapina Hangu
- Yamini
- Chitte Hejje Jadu
- Hit Wicket
- Urmila
- Maya Kinnari
- Guruvayanakere
- Devara Hucchu
- Chikkappa
- Chaithra Vaishaka Vasantha
- Ellanu Maduvudu Hottegagi
- VirahadaSankshiptaPadakosha
- L
- Ashwatthaman

=== Bengaluru Series ===
- Bengaluru
- Salam Bengaluru
- B Capital
- Ulida Vivaragalu Labhyavilla
- Mahanagara
- Puchche

=== Story collections ===
- SeeluNalige
- Jogi Kathegalu
- Kadu Hadiya Kathegalu
- Rayabhagada Rahasya Rathri
- Jarasandha
- Sufi Kathegalu
- Katha Samaya
- Facebook Dot Com – Manasa Joshi
- Nale Baa
- Ondanondu Ooralli
- 108- Naki Dashakada kathegalu
- Kathe Pustaka

=== Columns ===
- Bollywood 'Gha'sip
- Ravi Kanaddu – Ravi Kandaddu
- Janaki column
- Jogimane
- Roopa Rekhe
- Secret Diary
- Note Book
- Are Belaku
- AnkanaGaliAata
- MasalaDosege KempuChatney
- Sahaja Khushi
- Janaki with Love

=== Inspirational books ===
- Life is Beautiful
- Thande Thayi Devaralla
- Devarannu Nambabedi
- Preethisuvavarannu Kondubidi
- Nanu Badava Nanu Sukhi
- I hate my wife
- Avaru Ivaru Devaru
- Saavu (The art Of dying)

=== Play ===
- Vishwamitra Menake Dance MadoduEnakke
- SubitreBanna Ba bitre Sunna (NeenasamThirugata 2017)

=== Variety writings ===
- M Rangarao (personality)
- SadashivaAvara Aida Kathegalu (Edited)
- Jogi Reader (Audio collections of Jogi writings – Compiled by Sandhya Rani)
- Mathu, Mouna, Dhyana, Vishnuvardhana – A journalist's perception (Sep 2018)

=== Others ===
- Halage – Balapa (Lessons for new writers)
- Kathe, Chitrakathe, Sambhashane (Along with articles from 18 film directors)
- Edited a tributary under the name Bahuroopi Karnad post Karnad's demise; This is a collection of 37 articles by the who's who of Indian arts and literature

== Awards and recognition ==
1. Karnataka State Award for Best Story for Film Kada Beladingalu
2. Vaddarse Raghuram Shetty Award for Journalism
3. Bangalore Literature Festival Book Prize for achievements in Kannada Literature, 2021
4. Sahithya Rathna
5. Sahityashri Award, Karnataka Sahitya Academy, 2021
