= A. N. Prahlada Rao =

Indian author

A. N. Prahlada Rao (born 24 July 1953) is an Indian author and Kannada-language crossword compiler/ Constructor.

== Career ==
A. N. Prahlada Rao was born at Abbani in the Kolar district of Karnataka, India. He started his career as a journalist and was the founder editor of Honnudi.

Rao's involvement in crossword compilation is a hobby that developed from an interest in solving both Kannada and English crosswords while a student in the mid-1970s. He joined the Karnataka Information Department in 1983 in a public relations role and it was at that time he began to compile seriously. He now works as Media Coordinator to Minister for RDPR and IT BT, Government of Karnataka and compiles daily puzzles, sometimes with assistance from his wife. He specialises in themed puzzles and has a particular fondness for cinema. They have appeared in daily, weekly and fortnightly publications such as Prajavani, Samyukta Karnataka, Shakthi, Mangala, Vijaya Karnataka and Ee Sanje. Now he is creating daily Crosswords for Vijaya Karnataka, Samyukta Karnataka and Prajavani (Sahapati) and also Popular weeklies of Kannad Sudha and Taranga. By the end of April 2026 he has composed more than 55,000 Crosswords and quiz puzzles. Compilation initially took him around two hours but he had reduced that to no more than 20 minutes.

Aside from producing crosswords, Rao also sets quizzes for several publications, drawing on the same trivia and reference books that he has amassed for his compilation efforts. The front wall of his house includes a crossword grid of black and white tiles. Published 26 Kannada Crossword books.

He has contributed his crosswords to more than 40 Kannada periodicals in the 25 years to 2016.

== Crossword books ==
The first volumes of Kannada crossword puzzles compiled by Rao were launched on 14 February 2008. Three of the five Kannada crossword books are based on general knowledge, one on Kannada cinema, and another one for children.

To mark the centenary of the first crossword, in 2013 Rao wrote two Kannada crossword books, titled Pada Kreede and Pada Looka. Each contained 160 crosswords.

5 More Kannada Crossword books has released on 15.01.2017, titled Padajala, Padajaga, Padaranga, Padasampada and Padavyuha. Prof. Doddarangegowda, Poet released the books.

6 One more Crossword book containg of 180 crossword published in 2021. Book has been published by Vasanta Prakashana (https://www.flipkart.com/padahaasu/p/itm9099917badc0a)

7 eight crossword books and two Sudoku books written by him has released at a time on 05.09.2024 by Siddaramaih, Chief Minister of Karnataka at Bengaluru. (https://epaper.deccanherald.com/Home/ShareArticle?OrgId=1297d7be310&imageview=0)

== Limca Book of Record ==
As of 2016, Rao is noted in the Limca Book of Records for creating the greatest number of crosswords in a regional language.

== Karnataka Rajyotsava Award ==
A.N.Prahlada Rao is the recipient of the 2024 Karnataka Rajyotsava Award for creating the highest number of puzzles in India. Chief Minister Siddaramaiah, Deputy Chief Minister D.K.Sivakumar, Home Minister Dr. G. Parameshwar, Minister of Kannada Culture Shivraj Thangadagi, Chairman of Vidhanaparishat Basavaraja Horatti presented the award in front of the Vidhana Soudha on 1 November 2024. https://kannadanewsnow.com/kannada/a-n-prahlada-rao-conferred-with-rajyotsava-award-for-writing-the-most-phrases-in-india/ https://epaper.deccanherald.com/Home/ShareArticle?OrgId=1110e81c33f&imageview=1

== Kalam Book of World Record ==
His name has included in Kalam Book of World Records in 2019.

== ASIAN Record ==
A.N.Prahlada Rao's name has included in Asian Record Academy in 2021.

== Other works ==
- Bangarada Manushya (2005), a biography of Dr. Rajakumar, a popular Kannada film actor. Also translated into English as Dr. Rajkumar: The Inimitable Actor With A Golden Voice (2008).
- Belliterey Belagidavaru (Gems of the Silver Screen) (2007), contains profiles of 115 film stars of Kannada cinema
- Vasanta Mallika (Beginning Blossoms) (2008), a CD containing nine poems that were sung by Vasantha Shashi with music composed by Puttur Narasihma Nayak.
- Nanna Daari Vibhinna Daari - Rajanikanth (2013), about the Tamil film actor Rajanikanth
- Praana Padaka (2013), contains recollections of Rajakumar's wife, Parvathamma.
- Jaitrayaatre, a translation into Kannada of the similarly titled book written in English by K. Jairaj, an Additional Chief Secretary in the Indian Administrative Service. It documents Jairaj's experiences as an administrator over three decades and was serialised in the Kannada daily newspaper Vijaya Karnataka.
- Danivillada Dhani, a Book on B.R.Pantulu, Great Director, Produces and Actor in Kannada and Tamil, written by A.N.Prahlada Rao, published through Karnataka Chalana Chitra Academy has been released by Dr. Bharati Vishnuvardhan in November 2016 at Samsa.
- Hejjegurutu, a 600 pages book Kannada Film History, released by Dr.H.S.Venkateshamurthy, great poet in Kannada.

In 2009, 75 books about people who had contributed to Kannada cinema were released as part of the Platinum Jubilee Kannada Cinema-75 organised by Karnataka Film Chamber of Commerce. Among those books were two by Rao, being his earlier work on Rajakumar and T. S. Karibasaiah.

A.N.Prahlada Rao has inducted into the PR Hall of Fame, and felicitated with prestigious PRCI awards at the 12th Global Communication Conclave held at Pune, March 2018.
