= H. S. Krishnaswamy Iyengar =

Indian Kannada writer, journalist (1920–2008)

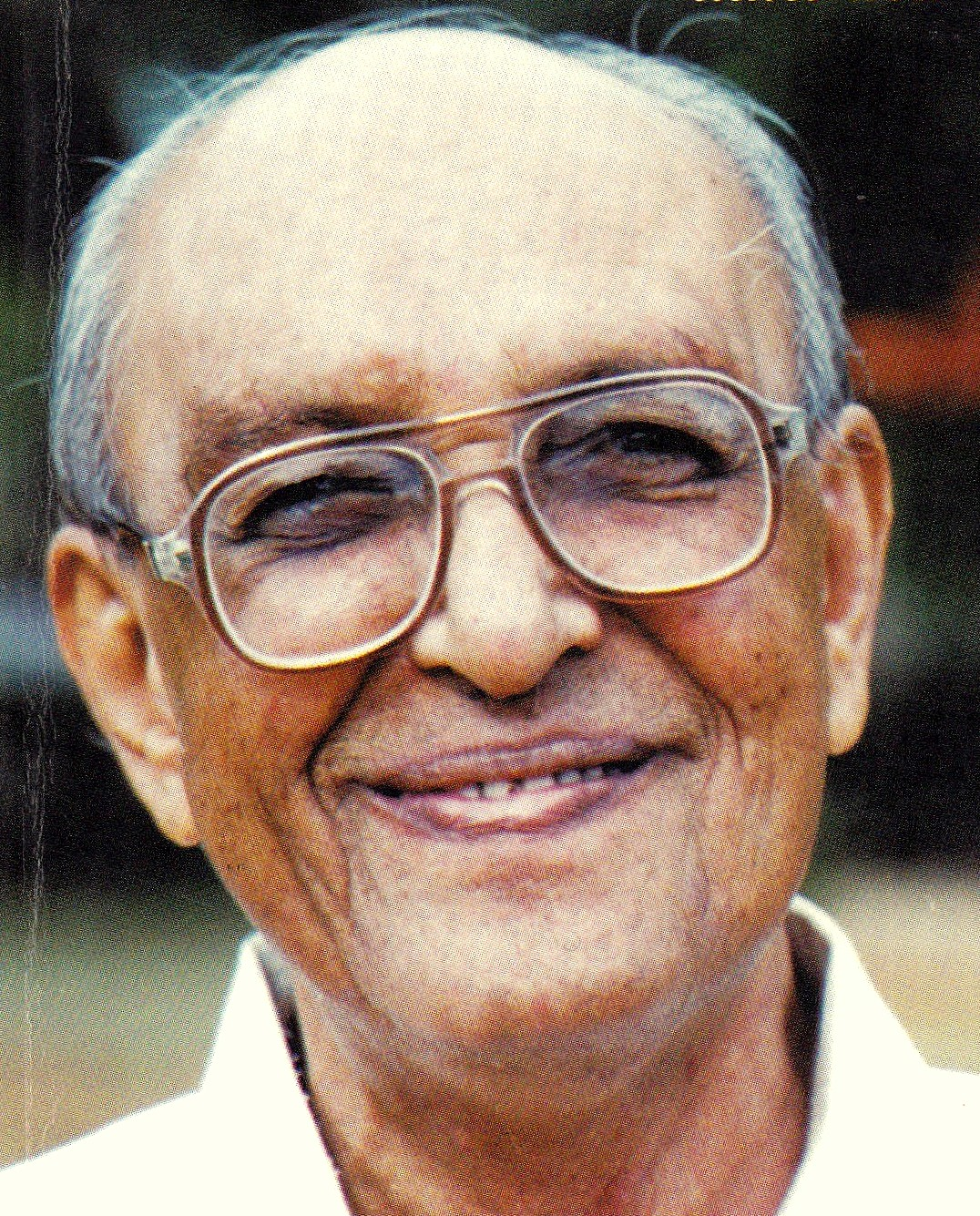
- Born: Haleyuru Srinavasa Krishnaswamy Iyengar (ಹಳೆಯೂರು ಶ್ರೀನಿವಾಸ ಕೃಷ್ಣಸ್ವಾಮಿ ಐಯ್ಯಂಗಾರ್); 26 August 1920; Haleyuru village, Krishnarajanagara, British India
- Died: 29 August 2008 (aged 88); Mysore, Karnataka.
- Education: Central College, Bangalore (then under University of Mysore)
- Occupations: Columnist; writer; essayist; critic; editor; poet; novelist; lecturer
- Spouse: Champalakshmi
- Children: 2
- Writing career
- Pen name: H. S. K. (Eccheske - ಹೆಚ್. ಎಸ್. ಕೆ)
- Language: Kannada, English
- Notable work: see Literary works
- Notable awards: see Recognition
- Website: H. S. Krishnaswamy Iyengar

Haleyuru Srinivasa Krishnaswamy Iyengar (H. S. K.) (26 August 1920 – 29 August 2008) was a Kannada columnist, essayist, novelist, critic and teacher of Economics and Commerce studies in Mysore. He is remembered for his character sketches and short essays on personalities and issues of national & international import, in his weekly column "Varada Vyakthi" (Kan: ವಾರದ ವ್ಯಕ್ತಿ). These appeared in the Kannada magazine "Sudha" continuously for nearly two decades. His literary critique "Kannadadalli Vidambana Sahitya" won him the Kannada Sahitya Akademi Award in 1981. His perspective on elements of Vishistadvaita in the works of Kuvempu were brought forth in his book "Kuvempu Sahityadalli Vishistadvaita – Darshana". H. S. K. penned close to thousand character sketches over two decades. These were later published in four collected volumes. He received the "Rajyotsava Award" from Government of Karnataka in 1997. For his lifetime contribution to Journalism and Kannada literature, the University of Mysore conferred a doctorate degree on him in 2004.

== Early years ==
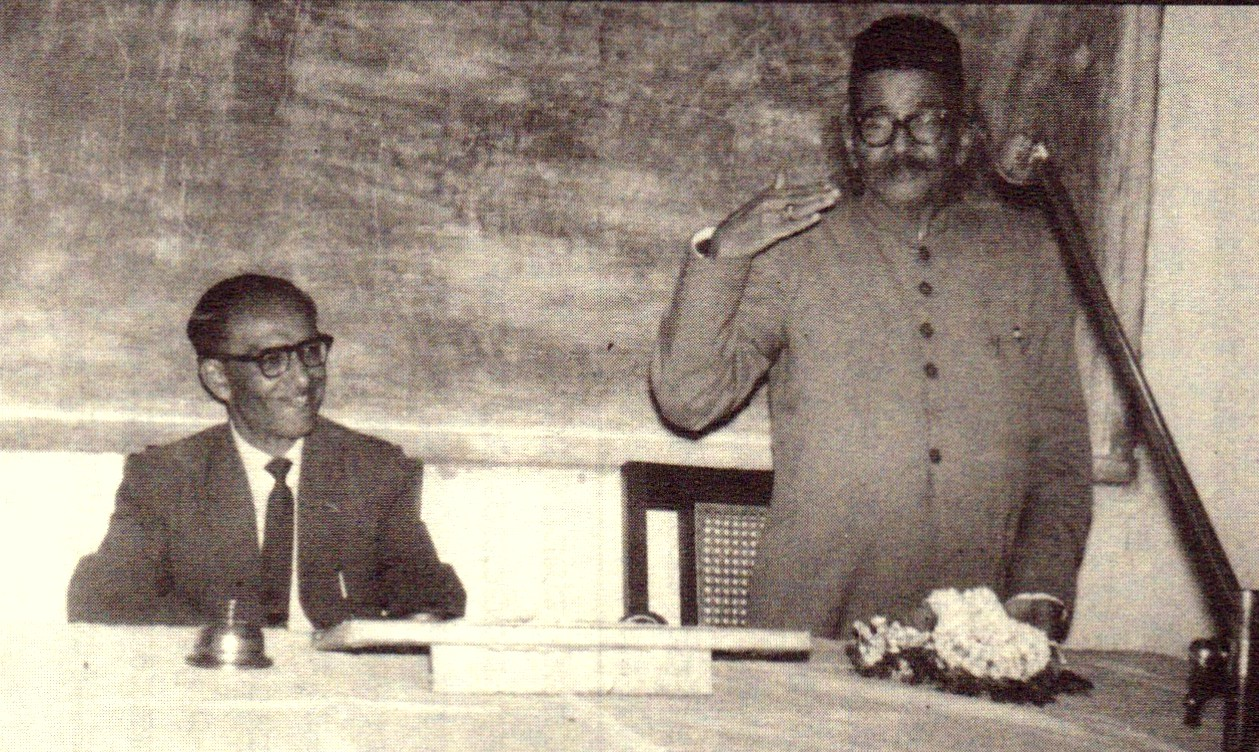
H. S. K. with D. R. Bendre at a function in Kannada Sahitya Parishat, Bangalore (1950s)

H. S. K. was born to a Tamil brahmin family in the village of Haleyuru near the picturesque tourist locale of Chunchanakatte in K. R. Nagar taluk of Mysore district, India. His parents were Srinivasa Iyengar and Alamelamma. Srinivasa Iyengar was a school teacher by profession. H. S. K. had his initial schooling in Siddapura school at Kempegowda Koppal (village) before moving to Dalavayi and Banumaiah High Schools at Mysore. During these years, H. S. K. began the "Kannada Sangha" (local Kannada literary assoc.) at K. R. Nagar. For a brief period, H. S. K. made a living distributing newspapers in and around his village. He worked as a reporter for then-popular Kannada periodicals "Tayinadu" (Kan: ತಾಯಿನಾಡು) and "The Hindu". H. S. K. completed his Intermediate qualification at Mysore and moved to Central College, Bangalore (then under the University of Mysore) in 1940 for his L. Com (Commerce degree) qualification. During the next three years of his L. Com studies at the Central College, H. S. K. scored good marks and thus secured free boarding at the Ramakrishna Student Home (as a scholarship). In this period, he came into contact with stalwarts of Kannada literary movement like B. M. Srikantaiah, G. P. Rajarathnam and D. V. Gundappa. He stood first in the "Kannada Sahitya Parishat's" exam and won the "Kannada Jana" prize which he personally received from B. M. Srikantaiah.

== Academician ==
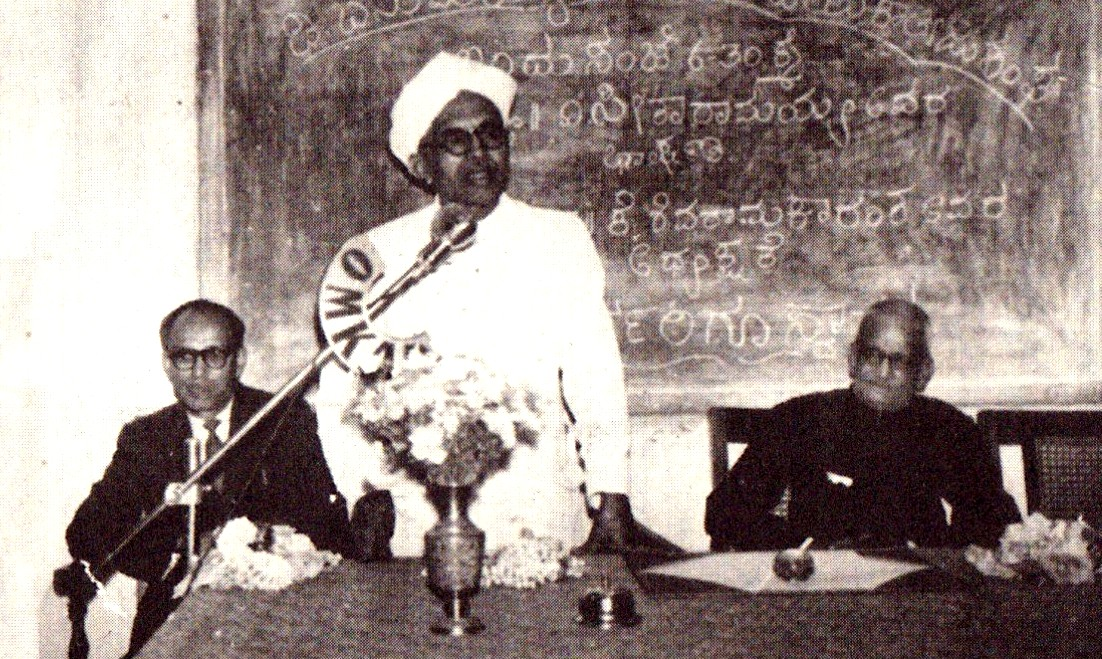
H. S. K. with V. Seetharamaiah at Banumaiah College, Mysore (1950s)

He completed his Bachelor's degree in Economics & Commerce studies in 1948 and joined National High School, Bangalore as a teacher. After a few years at National High School, he moved to 'Ranganatha Institute of Commerce', Bangalore as a member of the faculty. Around this time, Banumaiah College, Mysore invited H. S. K. to join its faculty in the department of Economics & Commerce. While at Banumaiah College, he completed his Master's degree in Economics from Benaras Hindu University in 1951. With a Master's degree, Krishnaswamy Iyengar was able to get promoted to the posts of Associate Professor, Professor and eventually ended up as Principal of the college. He retired from the institution in 1969. At the behest of Prof D. Javaregowda, H. M. Nayak and then Vice Chancellor Srimali, H. S. K. was invited to grace the post of Editor of Humanities Division of the "Kannada Encyclopedia Project" at University of Mysore. For ten years between 1970 and 1980, H. S. K. was additionally the Editor-in-Chief of "Manavika Karnataka" magazine from the University's press. During his tenure at the University of Mysore for eleven years, Krishnaswamy Iyengar also engaged classes for students in the Diploma and Post Graduate studies departments where he delivered lectures on "Indian Cultural Studies". He retired from the University of Mysore in 1980.

== Literary works ==
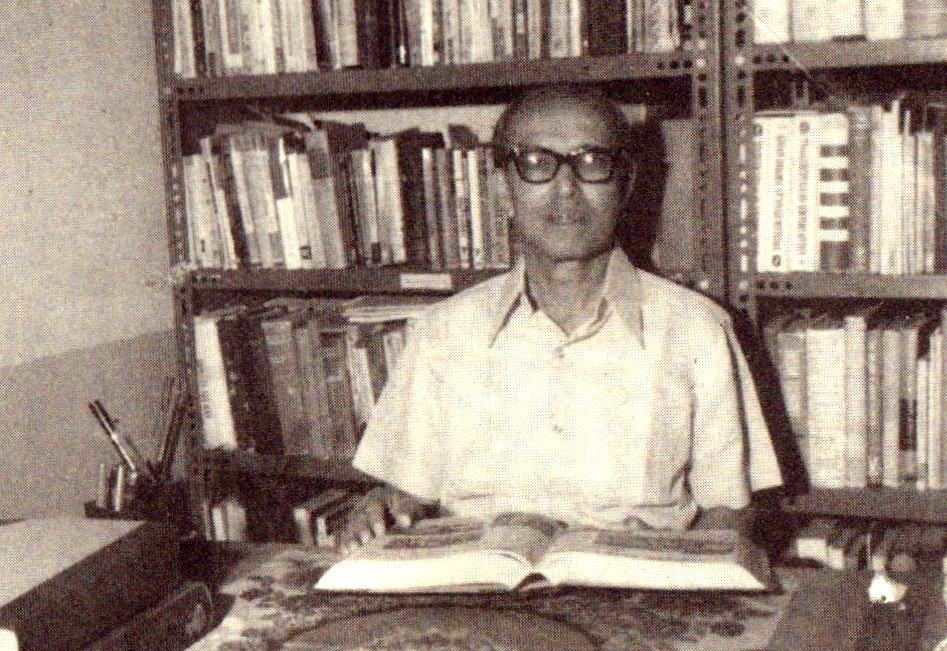
H. S. K. at his home library, Saraswathipuram, Mysore

H. S. K.'s writings span six decades. He wrote mainly in Kannada, but also authored a few works in English. While majority of his writing is essentially biographical in nature, he also experimented with poetry, novels, short stories, economic treatises and socio-political caricatures.

=== Regular columns ===
His earliest foray into writing columns for newspapers was in the form of articles which he submitted for ‘Deshabandhu’, ‘Vishwa Karnataka’ and ‘Chaya’ newspapers. He wrote also for the Kannada Sahitya Parishat's "Kannada Nudi" newspaper. He also wrote columns for "Prajavani", "Taranga", "Star of Mysore" and "Mysooru Mithra" newspapers as well.

=== Biographies ===
H. S. K. authored 1167 character sketches on numerous personalities at home and abroad. These appeared under the banner of "Varada Vyakthi" (Kan: ವಾರದ ವ್ಯಕ್ತಿ - "Person of the Week") columns in the popular "Sudha" Kannada magazine. These character sketches were collected into four volumes (as omnibus editions) under the titles: "Belaku Chellida Baduku", "Manyaru Samanyaru", "Gaganachukki Barachukki" and "Minchu Gonchalu". These volumes contained in them biographical sketches on personalities in India as well as abroad like S. Srikanta Sastri (Indian historian), Kuvempu (Kannada poet laureate), D. R. Bendre (Kannada poet), T. R. Subba Rao (Kannada writer), Nelson Mandela (Anti-apartheid activist), John McEnroe (Tennis player), Amartya Sen (Indian economist and Nobel laureate), Ramanujacharya (11th century Hindu theologian), Jayaprakash Narayan (Indian statesman) and Indira Gandhi (former Indian Prime Minister) to name a few. In the years following Emergency in India, H. S. K. authored a separate biography on Jayprakash Narayan in 1977. His collection of biographies on the leading Kannada litterateurs of the 1960s came out under the title of "Ettarada Vyaktigaḷu" in 1966. His biographical piece on noted Indian Economist V. K. R. V. was published in 1967 by Geetha Book House, Mysore. His next biographical work was on the Indian Film Director, Producer and Cinematographer B. R. Panthalu and this was published in 1979. H. S. K. authored what is often considered to be a definitive biography of Dr B. R. Ambedkar in 1977. Interestingly, H. S. K.'s biographical sketches were seldom limited to those in the socio-political arena and often extended beyond those confines. He wrote a well researched biography of the 10th century Indian theologian and philosopher Ramanujacharya in 1963.

=== Essays ===
His collections of essays came out under four different titles - "Jedana Bale", "Modada Maye", "Chandrakanthi" (Collection of lectures delivered on All India Radio - Akashvani) and "Gaddala" (on the hustle and bustle of city life). His collection of 12 short essays came out in 1980 under the title of "Surahonne: Hanneraḍu alita Prabandhagaḷu". He teamed up with Kannada writer and poet - K. S. Nissar Ahmed and Kannada writer A. R. Mitra to bring out an anthology of Kannada essays from 1974 till 1983 titled "Daśavārṣika Prabandhagaḷu". His collection of articles on the literature of the Haridāsas - a sect in Vaishnavism was published by Maṅgaḷa Bhāratī Prakāśana as "Dāsa Sāhitya Darśana" in 1984. His next collection of essays "Mēghalahari: Prabandha Saṅkalana" was published in 1989.

=== Novels and short stories ===
H. S. K.'s first novel "Mukti Marga" captured the challenges faced by a young idealist who returns to his native village with hopes of developing it. His next novel "Bayakeya Belè" dealt with the challenges and aspirations of a princely state (like Mysore) emerging out in the post-independence years. His third and last novel was "Kurukshetra". His collection of short stories includes"Aa Chitra" & "Muppina Sangathi".

=== Poetry ===
H. S. K. tried his hand at Kannada poetry and brought out collections of poems under titles - "Davanada Kone" (1989) and "Tingalurina Teru" (2001).

=== Economics and commerce ===
An Economist by education, H. S. K. wrote extensively on contemporary economic plans of the day, namely the Five Year Plans of the Government of India. His take on these plans came out as "Namma Abhivr̥ddhi Yojanegaḷu" (1960) and "Kēndradalli Janatā Mantrimaṇḍala" (1977). His 1971 work "Vanijyashastra Parichaya" was an introduction to the world of economics, which H. S. K. penned specifically for students of economics in the University.

=== On Kannada language ===
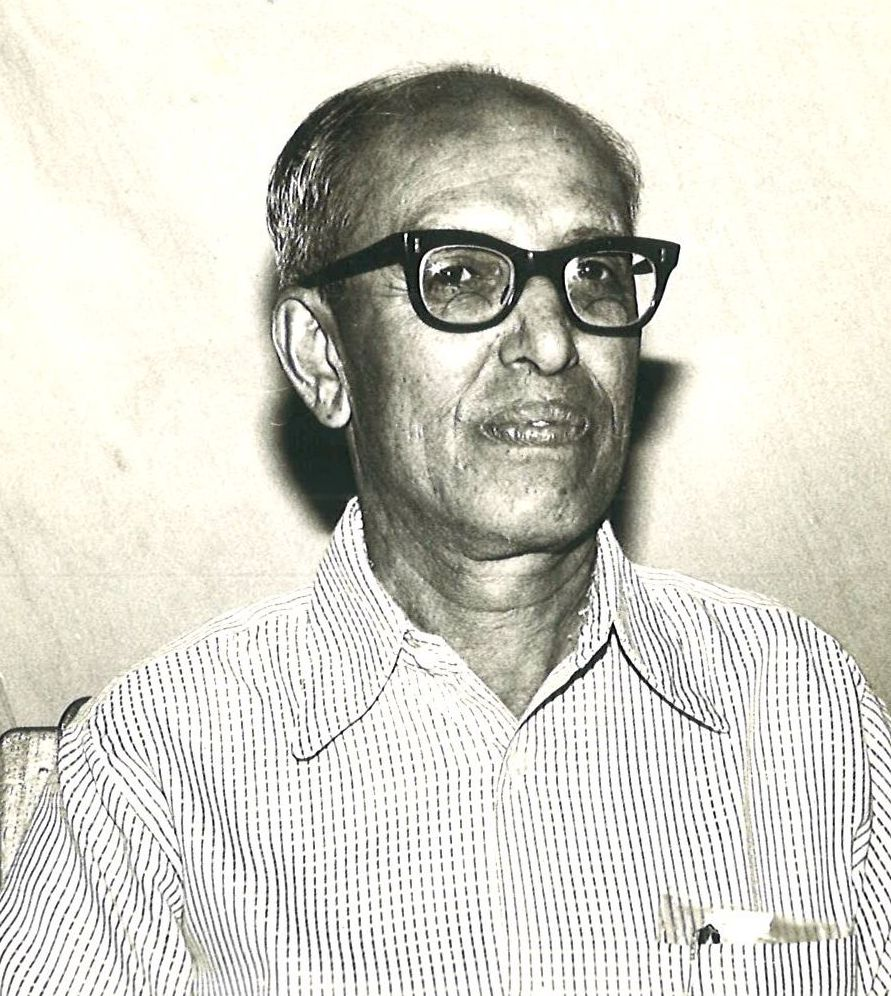
HSK in 1970

H. S. K. almost always wrote in Kannada language and advocated its use even in administrative circles. This perspective was propounded firmly in his works "Vyavaharika Kannada" (2004) and "Adalitha Kannada" (1991).

=== Edited works ===
- "Banking Nighantu"
- "Banking Prapancha"
- "Dasa-Sahitya Darshana"
- "Gandhiji: Ondu Punardarshana"
- "Avalokana : a compendium on Karnataka's heritage"
- “Akashavani"
- "Banuli Baravanige" - Collection of Radio Lectures by H. S. Krishnaswamy Iyengar

=== English works ===
- "Movers and Shakers of Mysore" [Two Volumes]
- “Kuvempu”
- “Bendre”
- "Shivarama Karanth"
- “Masti”

== Recognition ==
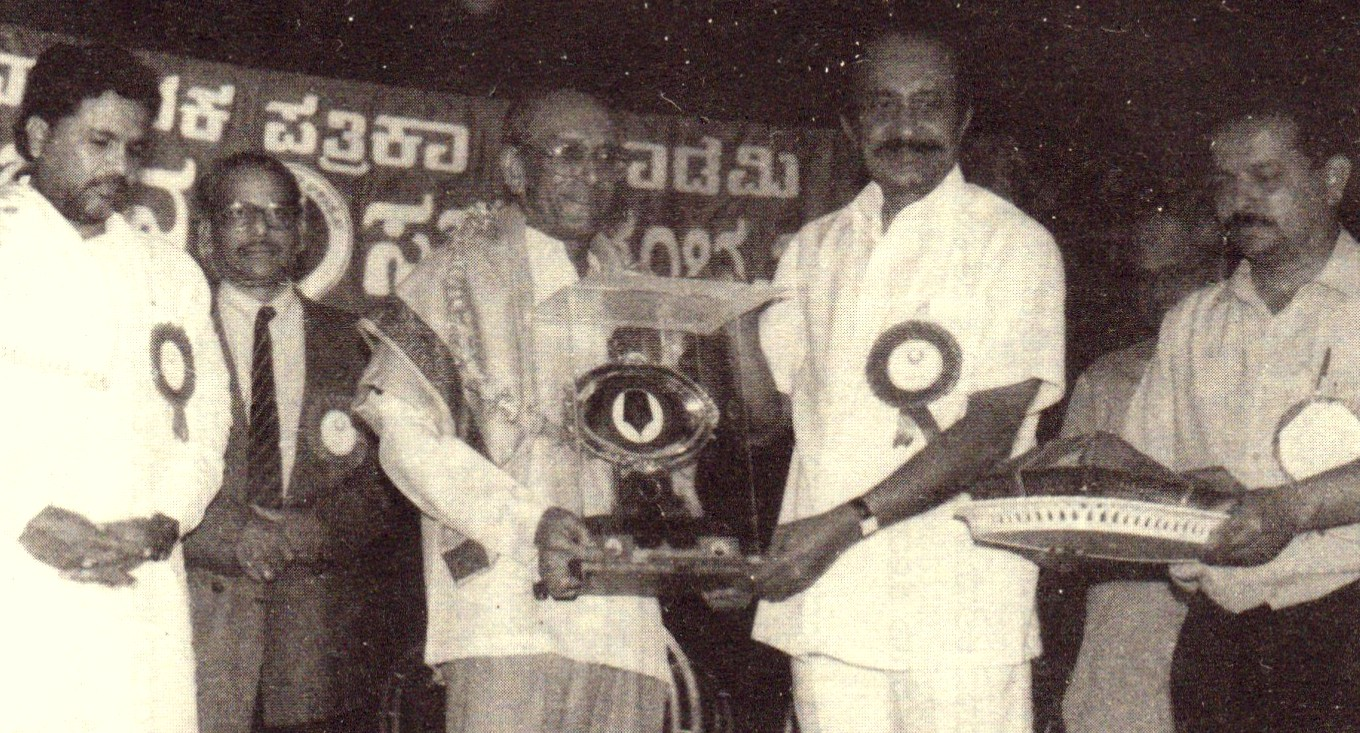
H. S. K. receiving the Karnataka Press Academy Honour (1996)

Six decades of writing, over a thousand biographies and character sketches, essays, anthology of poems, novels and short stories and small treatises on economics and commerce related matters made H. S. K. a household name in Kannada literary and journalistic circles. These are a few of the awards which came his way.

- Karnataka Sahitya Akademi Award (1981)
- Karnataka Patrika Akademi Award (1996)
- Rajyotsava Award (1997)
- Viswamanava Award (1999)
- H. K. Veeranna Gowda Award (1996)
- Ha Ma Na Award (1999)
- Rotary Model Award (2000)
- Ankanashri Award (2000)
- Felicitation Volumes: "Ayda Barahagalu" (60th birthday) & "Samadarśi" (75th birthday)
- Honorary Doctorate - D. Litt from University of Mysore (2004)

== Later years ==
H. S. Krishnaswamy Iyengar continued to write in his retirement years. He was a columnist for dailies such as "Star of Mysore", "Mysuru Mithra" and "Taranga" in the latter years. H. S. K. died at the age of 88 years on 29 August 2008 at Mysore after suffering a brief period of illness.

== Bibliography ==
- East - West Center Library (July 1965) - "Select list of recent publications"; Publishers: Honolulu, East-West Center Library, pp. 15.
- Amaresh Dutta (1988) - "Encyclopaedia of Indian literature / 2 Devraj to Jyoti"; Publishers: New Delhi : Sahitya Academy, pp. 1221.
- S. V. Upendra Charya (2019) - "People You Love to Know About: Of people, famous and forgotten": Publishers: NotionPress.com, ebook.
- K C Dutt; Sahitya Akademi (1999) - "Who's who of Indian writers, 1999"; Publishers: New Delhi : Sahitya Akademi
- Henry Scholberg (1987) - "South Asia biographical dictionary"; Publishers: Zug, Switzerland : IDC.
- Library of Congress, New Delhi (1979) - "Accessions List, India"; Publishers: New Delhi, Library of Congress Office.
- Praful Nandashanker Dave; Debi Prasanna Pattanayak (1974) - "Improving language skills in the mother tongue, a developmental-cum-experimental bridge course project for college entrants studying through the medium of mother-tongue, Kannada: Report"; Publishers: Mysore : Central Institute of Indian Languages; pp. 86
- Karnataka (INDIA) (1965) - "Karnataka State gazetteer: Mysore"; Publishers: Bangalore : Printed by the Director of Print, Stationery and Publications at the Govt. Press; pp. VII
- Dr. C. N. Ramachandran (2011) - "KANNADA: AKYANA-VYAKYANA"; Publishers: Sapna Book House; pp. 55
- Karnataka (INDIA) (1966) - "Karnataka State gazetteer: Mysore"; Publishers: Bangalore : Printed by the Director of Print, Stationery and Publications at the Govt. Press; pp. 691
- Gaṅgā Rām Garg (1992) - "Encyclopaedia of the Hindu World, Volume 3"; Publishers: New Delhi : Concept Pub. Co.; pp. 827
