= K. N. Guruswamy =

Liquor businessman and newspaper publisher

Kanekal Nettakallappa Guruswamy
- Born: 1901; Bangalore, Mysore State, British India
- Died: 1990 (aged 88–89); Bangalore, Karnataka
- Occupations: Publisher; businessman
- Children: K. A. Nettakallappa (adopted son)

Kanekal Nettakallappa Guruswamy (1901–1990) was a liquor businessman and newspaper publisher from Bangalore, Karnataka.

== Founder ==
Guruswamy founded The Printers (Mysore) Private Limited, the company that publishes Deccan Herald, Prajavani, Sudha and Mayura in 1948.

== Deccan Herald and Prajavani ==
Deccan Herald was launched on 17 June 1948. According to Gautham Machaiah, its owners purchased a dance club—Funnel's owned by an Irish couple. The intention was of starting a movie theatre (there were already two other theatres on either side—Plaza and Liberty) but then opted for a newspaper, despite having "zero experience in journalism or print business". Soon after this, a Kannada-language daily Prajavani was also launched.

== Businessman of Ballari (Bellary) ==
Founder K.N. Guruswamy (1901-1990) was the eldest son of a prominent businessman of Ballari (Bellary), who later shifted to Bangalore, and the family belonged to the Ediga community, which was traditionally involved in toddy tapping. They won excise contracts and expanded their business across (then known as Mysore, now Karnataka). Bangalore was then under the Mysore kingdom, ruled by the Wodeyers, and lacked an English newspaper in those times. The then Diwan of Mysore, Arcot Ramaswamy Mudaliar, is believed to have been instrumental in convincing Guruswamy to start an English-language daily and he launched the firm The Printers (Mysore) Pvt Ltd. Justice P P Medappa, later the state's chief justice, suggested the name Deccan Herald.

== Media investments ==
Of the Rs 500,000 capital, some 75% came from Guruswamy. Other shareholders were K. Venkataswamy, Moola Rangappa, M K Swamy and Dondusa, according to Machaiah. He documents the challenges of getting it started. Deccan Herald was initially launched as an eight-page tabloid paper, priced at one anna. It later became a broadsheet. Deccan Herald launched a sister daily in Kannada, called Prajavani. T. S. Ramachandra Rao was its first editor. It has played a prominent role in the world of Kannada newspaper journalism. Subsequent publications launched by the group include lifestyle magazine Sudha (initiated in 1965 and edited by E.R. Sethuram) and the literary magazine Mayura, launched in 1968. Only in 1956, eight years after launch, was the newspaper able to break even. Earlier, Guruswamy had to depend on bank loans and selling all but three of the 35 buildings he had purchased from proceeds of his excise business. Guruswamy moved out of from the liquor business by 1986.

== Other enterprises and initiatives ==
Among the other links online are the K.N. Guruswamy and Company, incorporated in Karnataka in 1970 with an authorised capital of Rs 20 lakh (two million rupees).The K.N.Guruswamy Memorial Trophy, for horse-racing in Bengaluru, has been covered on online racing channels. The K.N.Guruswamy Educational and Charitable Trust is also present. The Ashram School was started by K.N.Guruswamy.

== Philanthropy ==
The 2012-launched Nettakallappa Aquatic Centre (NAC) -- named after his heir and nephew—is currently (as of September 2020) managed by the K. N. Guruswamy Educational & Charitable Trust, which focuses on education and sports. This centre is based at the Uttarahalli Main Road, in Padmanabhanagar, Bengaluru 61. Nettakallappa supported sporting associations including those related to badminton, mountaineering and athletics during the early days of sports in Karnataka.

== Family and heirs ==
Guruswamy, being without an heir, adopted his brother K.N. Anjanappa's son K.A. Nettakallappa, who became a well-known journalist but died young at the age of 47. Nettakallappa and Prajavani editor Ramachandra Rao are credited with playing a pioneering role in founding the Press Club of Bangalore. Nettakallappa's sons—K.N. Hari Kumar, K.N. Tilak Kumar, and K.N. Shanth Kumar—have been at the helm of the publications. The publications adopt a policy of "objectivity, integrity, impartiality and truth flying high". Its tagline currently (2019) is "The Power of Good."
