= Sakhi (magazine) =

- Cover of February 2016 issue
- Categories: Women's Interest
- Frequency: Fortnightly
- Format: Print (Paperback), Online
- Publisher: Express Publications, Madurai
- Founded: 2001
- Company: The New Indian Express
- Country: India
- Based in: Chennai, Tamil Nadu, India
- Language: Kannada
- Website: Sakhi Official website

Sakhi is a Kannada fortnightly women's interest magazine, that is circulated in Karnataka, India. The magazine's headquarters are located in Chennai, Tamil Nadu, India. Originally launched as a monthly publication, Sakhi was initiated by the Dainik Jagran Group in March 2001.

== Sister publications ==
- The New Indian Express, an Indian English-language broadsheet daily newspaper
- Kannada Prabha, a daily Kannada language newspaper

== See also ==
- List of Kannada-language magazines
- Media in Karnataka
