= B. N. Subramanya =

Indian journalist

- Born: Badoor N. Subramanya
- Occupation: Journalist

Badoor N. Subramanya, also known as Banasu or Subbanna, is an Indian film journalist and critic known for his work on Andolana and Viggy.com.

== Life and career ==
Subramanya is from Kasaragod. During college, he participated in theatre. As part of the NCC, he participated in an Advanced Leadership Camp and a mountaineering camp at Manali in 1972 and has a C certificate. He did his post-graduate studies at Calicut University in 1976. He worked as a lecturer at JSS College in Dharwad before joining the Chitradeepa film magazine as a journalist. He worked on several publications such as the Chitratara, Janavaahini, Karmaveera, and Samyuktha Karnataka.

Starting in 1992, Subramanya worked as a media representative at the International Film Festival of India. In 2002, he and fellow journalist Roopa Hegde founded Viggy.com, which was one of the only websites regularly covering Kannada cinema in the 2000s apart from Chitraloka.com. The website featured articles in both English and Kannada. He wrote the Naa Kanda Rajkumar column for Viggy.com. He has also worked in the editorial department on the two volume book series by the Kannada University in Hampi published in 2002 on the history of Kannada cinema titled Kannada Chitrarangada Itihasa. In 2004, he won the Appaji Gowda Memorial award presented by the Karnataka Union of Working Journalists. Starting in 2006, Subramanya was also associated with the Bengaluru International Film Festival. Subramanya worked as an advisory panel member at the CBFC regional office in Bengaluru. He was member for the Southern Region II at the 62nd National Film Awards in 2015.

Subramanya worked for as a freelance journalist for the Wide Angle section of the Mysore-based Andolana daily. He was one of the awardees of Bengaluru Mahanagara Palike's Kempegowda Awards in 2019. In 2023, he was the president for Karnataka Chalanachitra Patrakartara Sangha, an association for Karnataka film journalists that was formed that year. He sent nine articles from Andolana in both Kannada and English to the National Film Awards and won the Critic Special Mention Award at the 69th National Film Awards later that same year.
