= Kasthuri (magazine) =

- May 2018 edition's cover, of magazine
- Head (editor-in-chief): Arun Hegde
- Categories: Family interest
- Frequency: Monthly
- Format: Print (Paperback)
- Publisher: Samyukta Karnataka, Karmaveera
- Founder: Loka Shikshana trust (established 27 April 1933)
- Founded: 1921; 105 years ago
- First issue: 1921
- Company: Samyukta Karnataka, Karmaveera
- Country: India
- Based in: Bengaluru, Karnataka
- Language: Kannada
- Website: Publisher official website

Kasthuri or Kasturi is a major Kannada monthly family magazine published in Karnataka, India, with headquarters in Bengaluru, Karnataka. It is also published in Mangaluru, Gulbarga, Davangere, and Hubli.

Kasthuri covers topics like society, Kannada poetry, science fiction, spirituality, health, travel, technology, cookery, book review, beauty. It publishes a large number of editorial cartoon, on politics and society.

The magazine is subscribed to by educational institutions such as Tumkur University, JSS College of Arts, Commerce & Science, Kuvempu University, Mysore University, Mangalore University, and Gulbarga University etc.

== History ==
Kasthuri (RNI:Reg.No.3633/1957) was first published in 1921. Ranganath Ramchandra Diwakar, a former president of the KPCC, established the ′Loka Shikshana Trust′ (meaning: World Education Trust) on 27 April 1933, which publishes both Kasthuri and Karmaveera, a weekly Kannada magazine.

Kannada writer and poet, P.V. Acharya was one among the many editors of Kasthuri, including Radhakrishna Bhadti and writer-journalist Nagesh Hegde

Cover of magazine's February 2009 edition

== See also ==
- List of Kannada-language magazines
- Media in Karnataka
- Media of India
