= Vasudev V. Shenoy =

Vasudev Vaman Shenoy
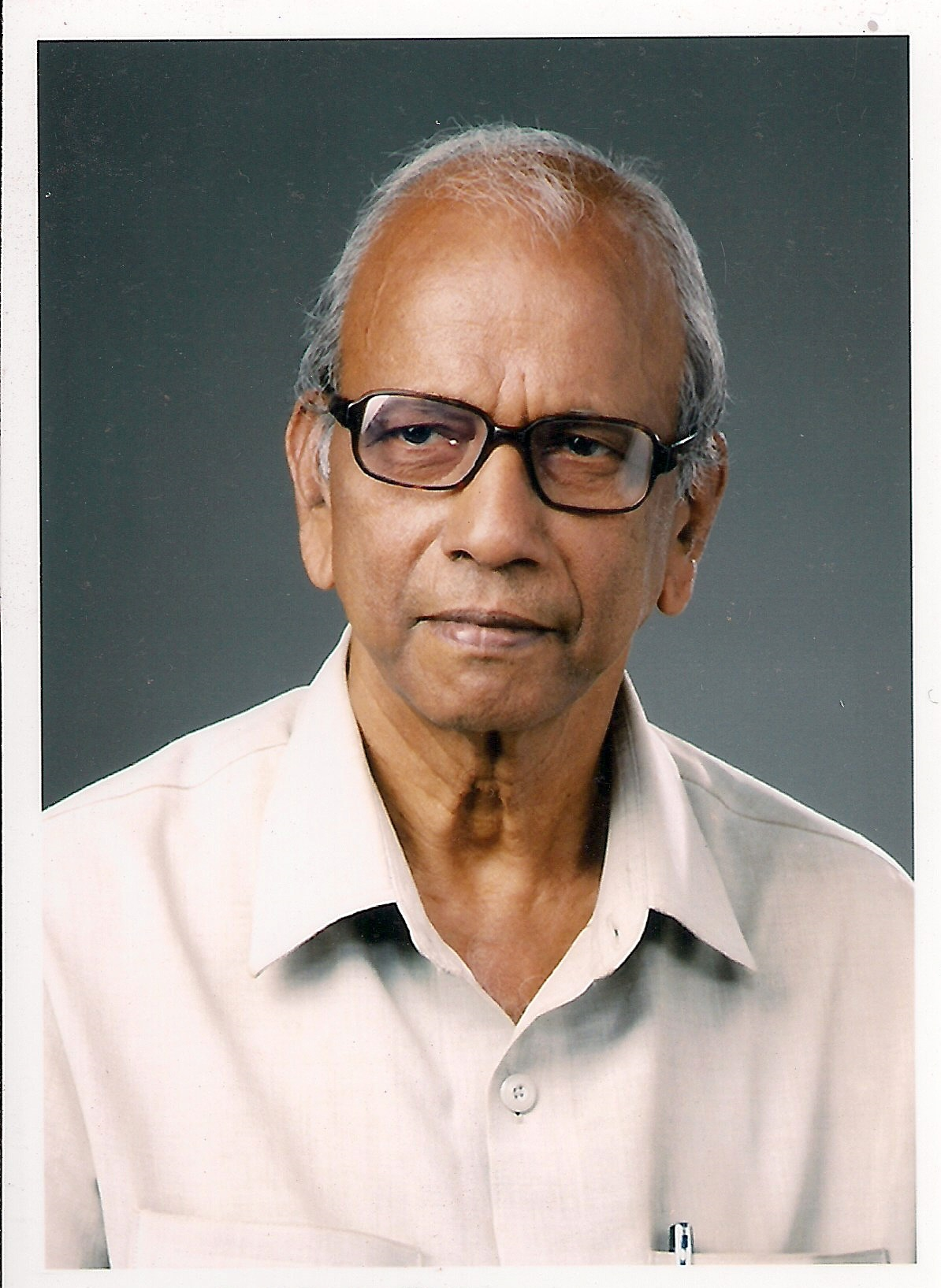
- Born: 15 February 1940; Borkatte, Karkala taluk, Udupi, Karnataka, India)
- Died: 9 March 2015 (aged 75); Belgaum, India
- Occupations: Founder Director of Students' Information & Guidance Bureau; Journalist; Social Activist
- Spouse: Aruna V Shenoy
- Children: 3

Vasudev Vaman Shenoy (15 February 1940 – 9 March 2015), better known as V. V. Shenoy, was a notable educationist, educational counsellor, journalist and a social activist. He was also a plants enthusiast and popular for developing the Panchavati Terrace Gardens on the terrace of his house frequented by several eminent personalities over time. He is the Founder Director of Students' Information & Guidance Bureau, an institution recognised for educational counselling, solving unemployment problems and for supporting, and encouraging students to pursue their educational programs for further employment and choice of career. Shenoy died on 9 March 2015 due to medical complications.

== Early life ==
Shenoy was born on 15 February 1940 in Borkatte, Karkala Taluk, Karnataka. He did his initial schooling in a small village elementary school in Borkatte. Due to poor financial conditions at home, he left at the age of 14 and ventured out in search of work. He then pursued his high school education at S.V.T. Higher Elementary School, St. Thomas High School, Honnavar and then Janata Vidyalaya, Dandeli, part by part, with the help of the finances he managed to earn through the chores he did at various places. He came to Belgaum around 1963 to pursue his higher education and did his Bachelor of Science at the Raja Lakhamagouda Science Institute. He was known for his commanding, leadership qualities for holding a soft corner for his fellow students and other people. Be it academics, extracurricular activities, National Cadet Corps, representing the college, or various other organizations and other social activities, he was known to excel in it all. While getting his Bachelor of Science, he had to support his family back home as well as look after his basic needs in Belgaum. This is when he saw and realized the amount of difficulties students faced at their peak age of career decision making and education attaining phase. He then pursued and successfully completed his Bachelor of Education in Belgaum as he believed that it would help him in understanding the students' issues and the situation of the educational system. In 1968, he started (invented) a unique organization called Students' Information & Guidance Bureau. This organization serves over 60 lac members/students by solving, guiding and helping them achieve their higher education and career choices. In the last ~40 years, he worked and served in innumerable organizations/fields, mainly including journalism, horticulture, Kannada & Konkani culture, literature, and traditions. He always believed that it was not necessary to be a politician, minister, or a celebrity to be a social worker and work for the welfare of the people.

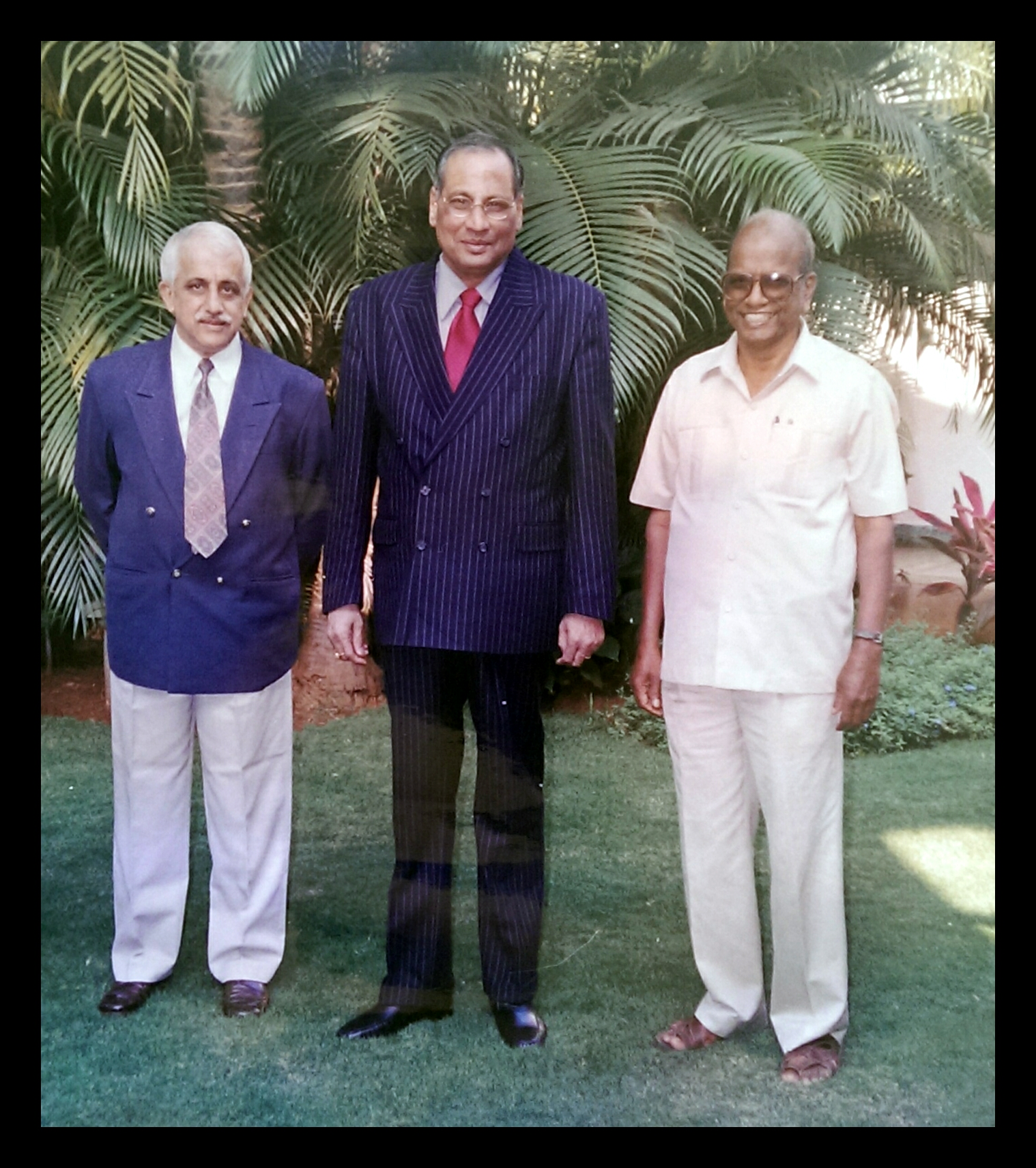
V.V.Shenoy with his classmate of his school days Mr. S.R.Nayak, Former High Court Justice and current Chief of Law Commission India and Sr. Judge Chidanand Rao

== Students' Information & Guidance Bureau ==
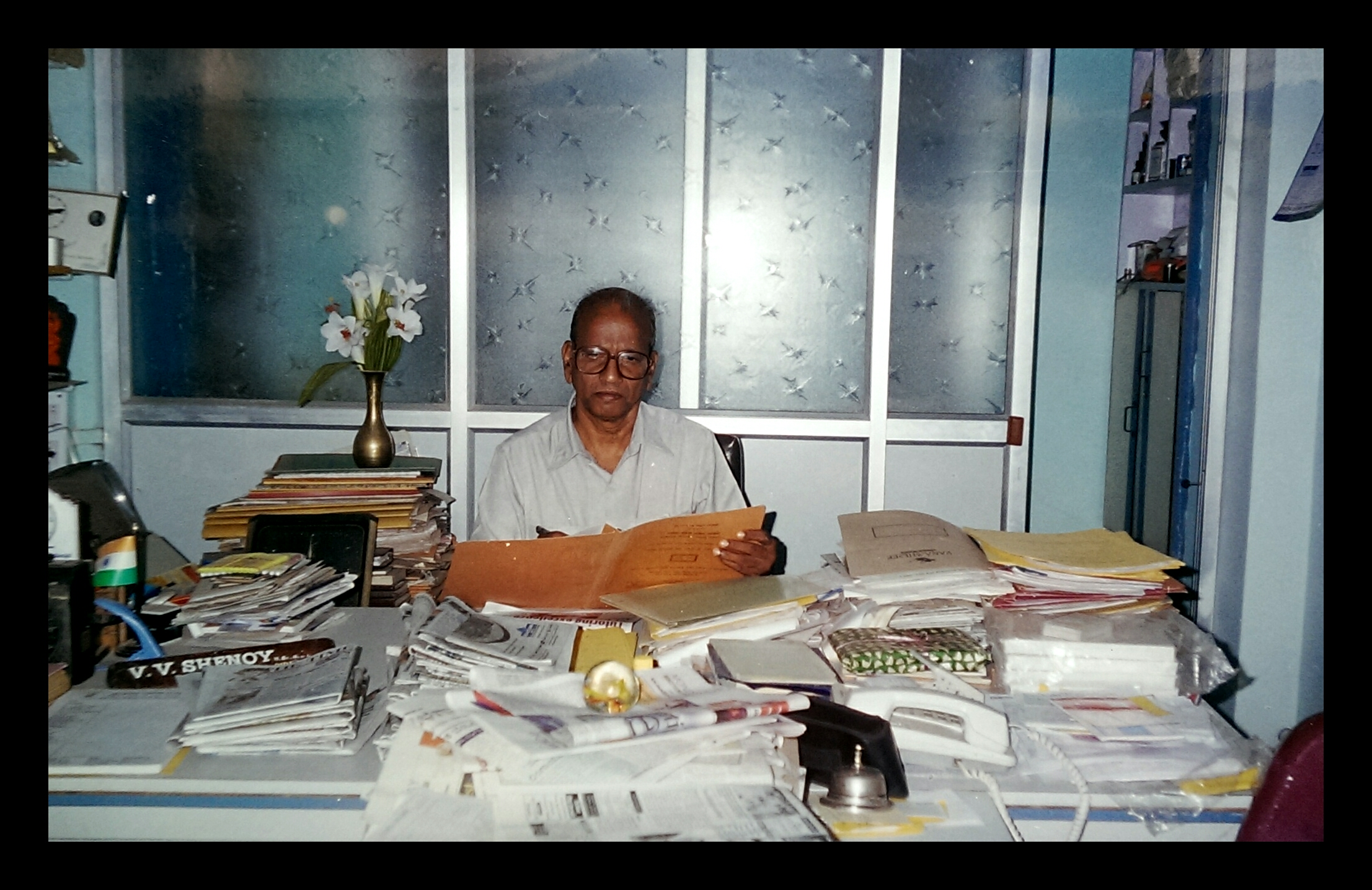
Mr. V.V. Shenoy at SIGB

Students' Information & Guidance Bureau or SIGB was founded by Vasudev V Shenoy in 1968. He was approximately 28 years old when he started the institution. Located at Shanivar Khoot, Kakatives in Belgaum City, the institution provides guidance, detailed information of various courses available at various universities, apprenticeship available at private industrial sectors, scholarships provided by various institutions, government job opportunities, detailed information of banking, LIC and other such examinations, competitive exams, engineering and medical education facilities, job opportunities available for the youth and many other such information in and around Belgaum city and North Karnataka. The institution also had a branch office at Tilakwadi, Belgaum for over 30 years which closed in 2006 as he preferred concentrating and personally attending to and devoting his time at one place at the head office. This Institution is not a government run office, Employment Exchange, University Branch office/Agency or any other Institute but a private run Institution for the well-being of the students. SIGB has further sub sections of functioning i.e. STUDENTS' HELPLINE through which candidates pursue their U.G and P.G correspondence courses for a couple of universities in Karnataka and STUDENTS' BOOK BUREAU where the latest and current job opportunities in various sectors are managed for the candidates.

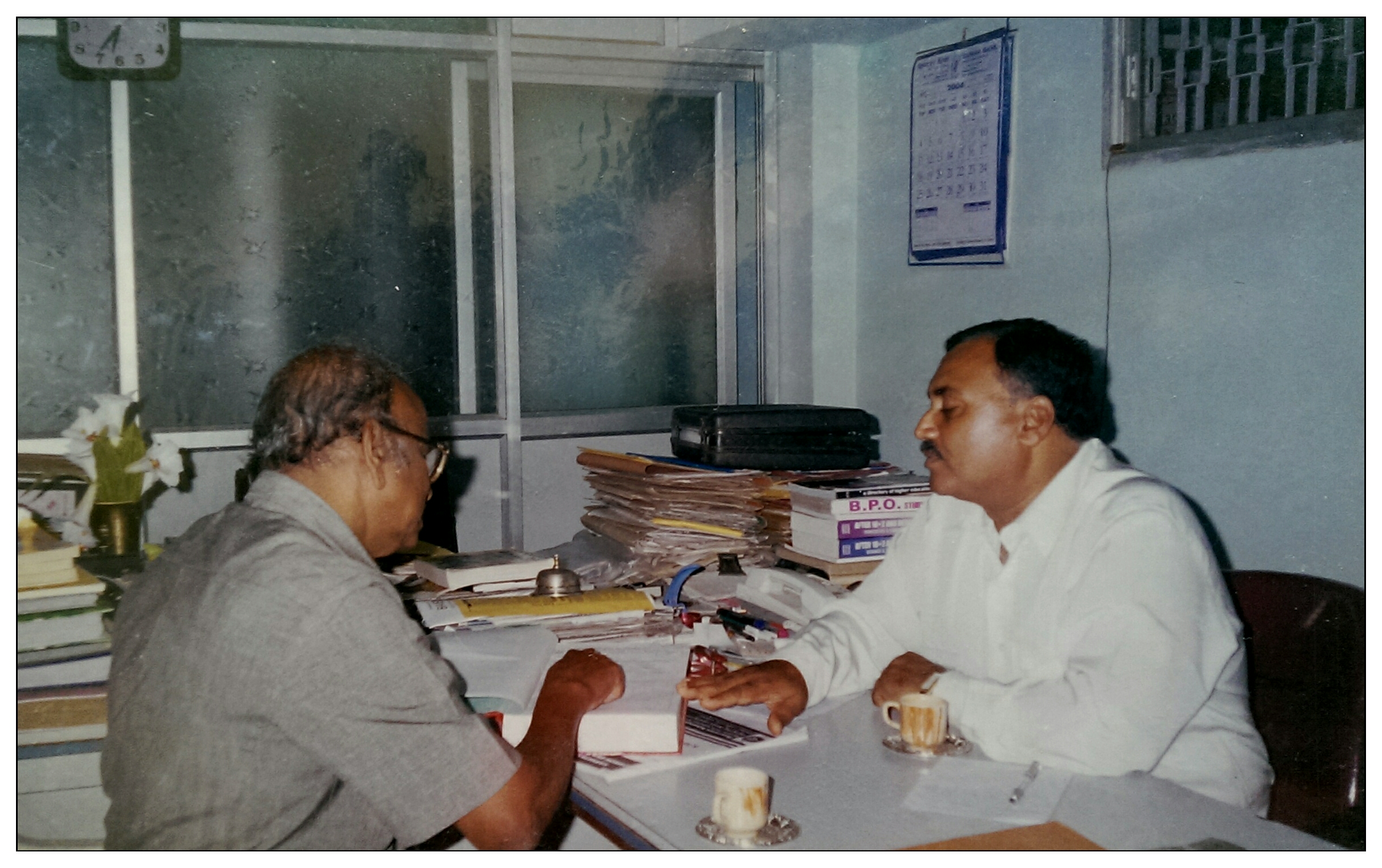
DG and IGP, Karnataka Mr. OmPrakash with Shenoy at his office Students' Information & Guidance Bureau

A separate division was started for providing special guidance to the youth and the underprivileged in 1981. The then Education Minister G.B.Shankar Rao inaugurated this division and officially became the first member on that day.

Shenoy personally attended to and guided most of the students to attain information and achieve education in their particular preferred field of interest. A lot of poor or underprivileged students seeking help guidance or information, have gained much so that they could complete their education. He had a wide range of sources from where he collected all the knowledge and information which he imparted onto the candidates. Important information/ news / ads reported in the various newspapers in various languages are compiled and made available on the notice board for the candidates' perusal on a daily basis. Job opportunities list is made available to all the candidates on the notice board.

Guides, nooks, old/model question papers thousands of reference books and important education, commerce, science, current affairs etc. related documents, collected from over the last 30 years are made available for the candidates' reference. This institution has helped and has had above 60 lakh members over the time.

Several personalities and notable persons have visited over the time and commended Shenoy's unique venture and his desire to work for the society and students in particular. Few of them namely G.B. Shankar Rao, S. R. Nayak, Chairman of Law Commission of Karnataka, OmPrakash, D.G. & I.G.P, Karnataka State, P J Nayak, Deputy Commissioner, PS Ramanujan, S. V. JaishilRao, H. M. Nagaraja Rao, G. V. Naik, Collector Customs Central Excise, H. M. Nayak, R. Shankarappa, Divisional Commissioner, I. M. Vithalmurthy, Charuhasan, Advocate and Film artist etc. Also eminent Kannada writers like Krishnamoorthy Puranik, K. Shivaram Karanth, U. R. Ananthamurthy, Santosh Kumar Gulwadi, Vyasrai Ballal and many more have visited SIGB.

SIGB currently functions and looked after by Mrs. Aruna Vasudev Shenoy.

== Panchavati Terrace Garden / Horticulture Department ==
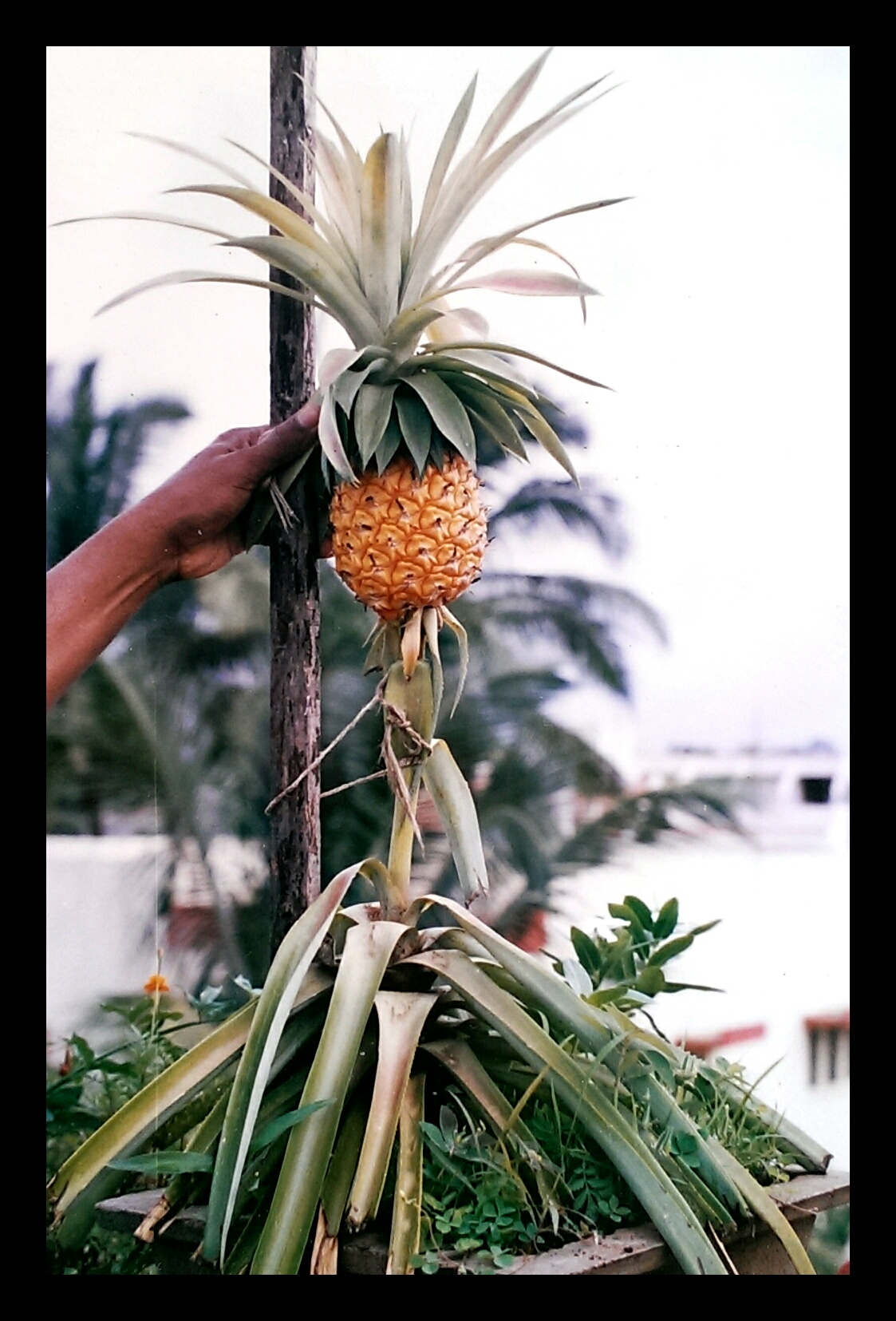
Pineapple grown in a small pot atop the terrace garden

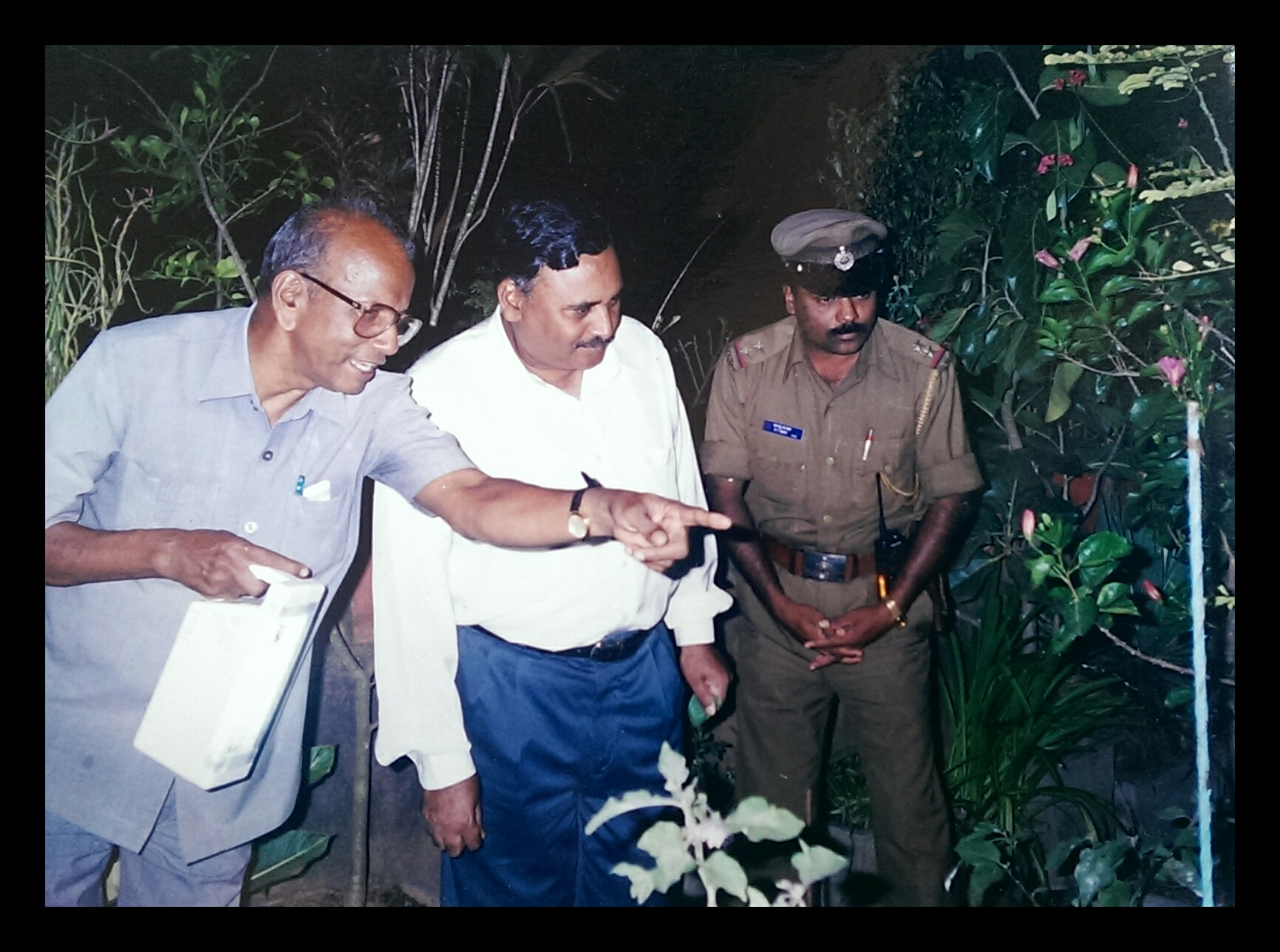
V.V.Shenoy with DG & IGP OmPrakash at Panchavati Terrace Garden.

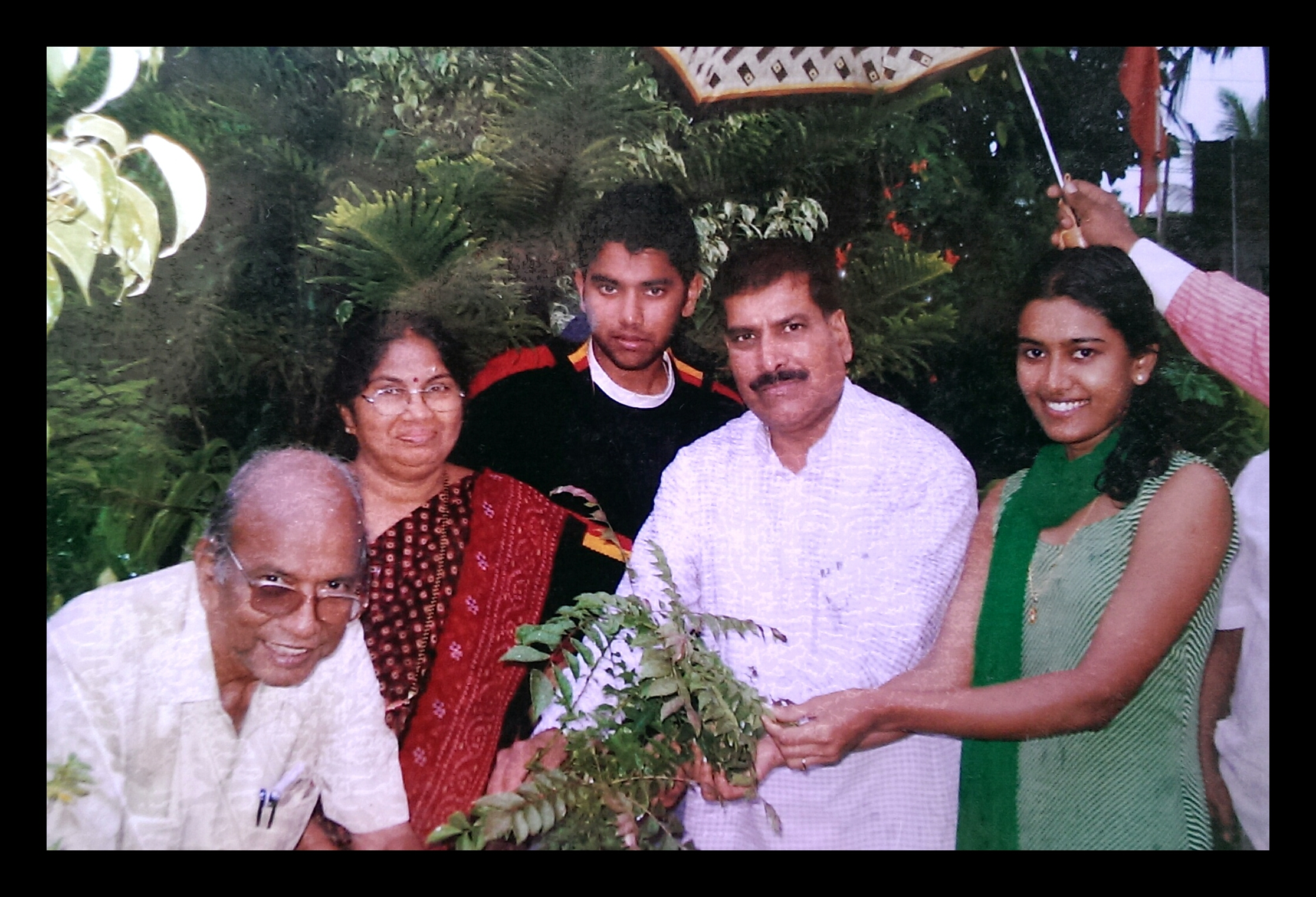
Member of Parliament Shri Suresh Angadi visiting Mr. Shenoy's home terrace garden.

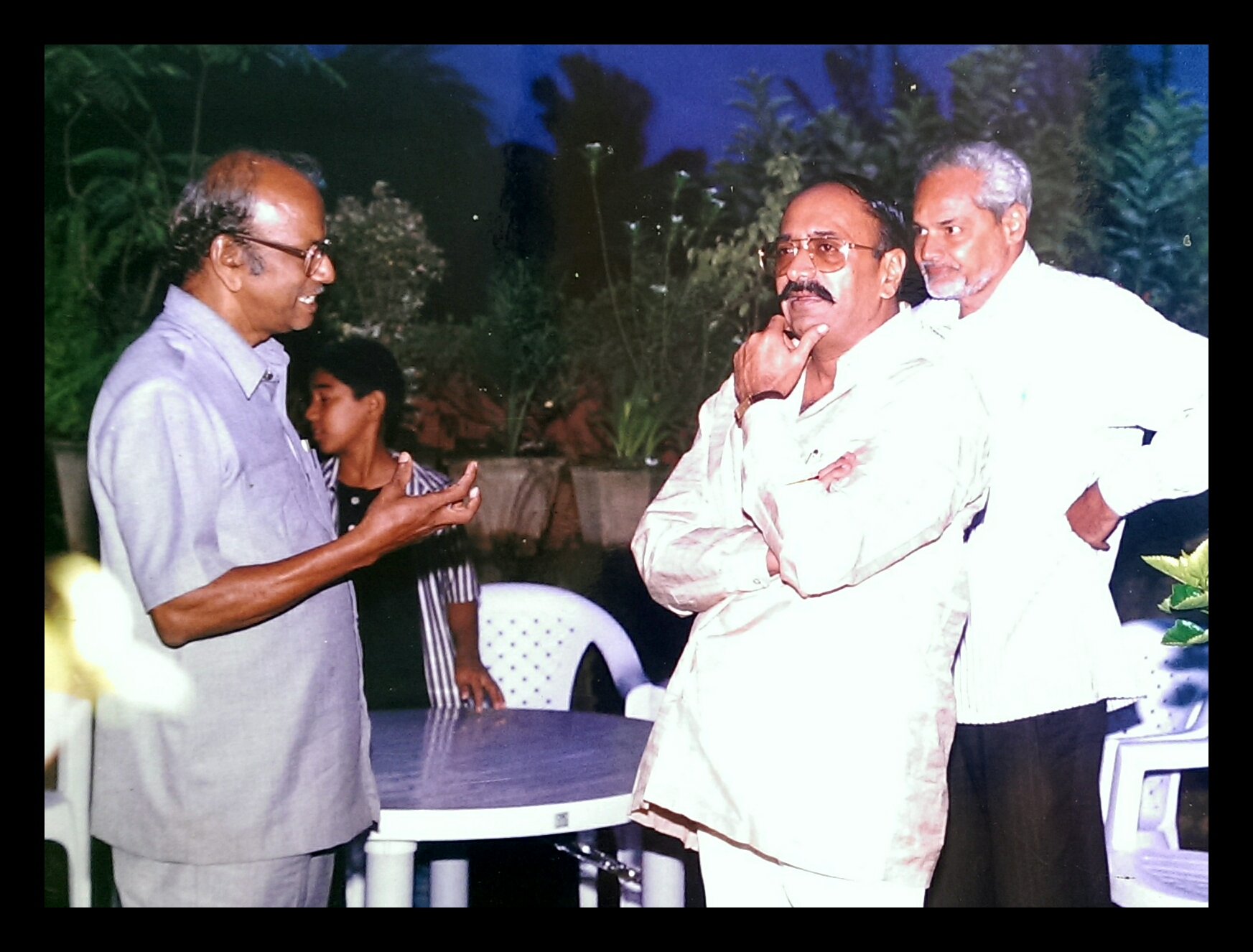
Mr. Veerkumar Patil, Minister for Power and Energy in Karnataka with V.V.Shenoy.

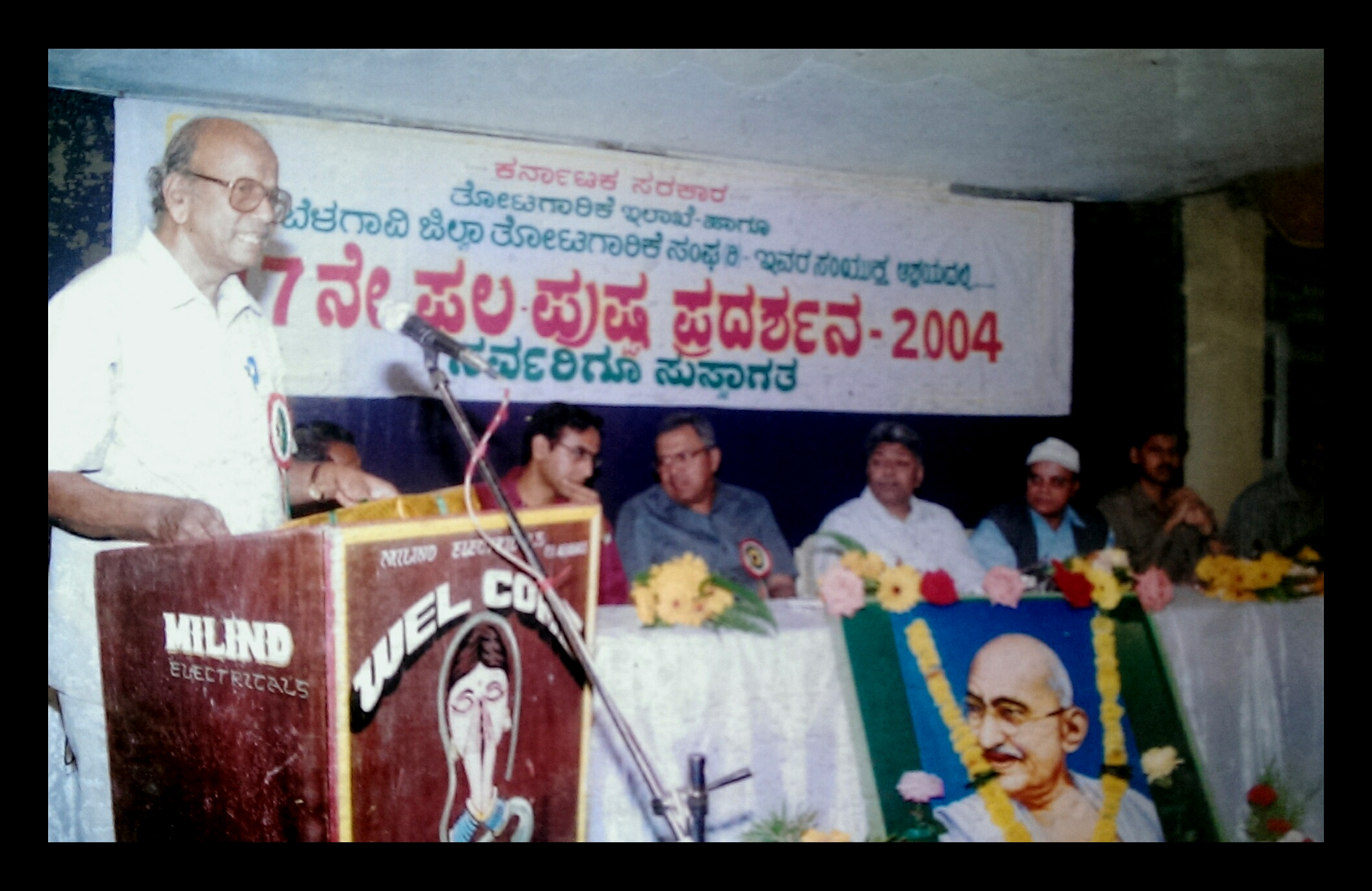
Mr. Shenoy addressing the audience at the Horticulture Show, Hume Park, Belgaum.

Shenoy has developed a terrace garden that is used as a learning space for local students and a social area for the visitors. The garden contains many types of vegetable and fruit trees, flowering plants, and herbs.

Despite of their different sizes, all the plants grow in pots that are 22 inches tall or smaller. For example, large species like Banyan and Coconut trees grow alongside smaller plants like Roses and Tulsi. To use the space efficiently, herbs like Mint and Lemongrass are planted underneath the larger fruit trees. The garden produces various fruits like mangoes on three-foot-tall plants and pineapples in pots. It also includes functional plants like Stevia, which is used by some to manage blood sugar. The garden also have exotic plants like Strawberries, Annapurna (a long leafy plant which put in the cooker while making rice gives an aroma of Basmati rice), AloeVera, Wild Berries, White Jamun or the Jaam, Starfruit, Chayote, Stevia (a plant very famous for diabetes controlling and eradicating powers), Brahmakamal and many more

This garden is tended by the family without any professional gardener. The garden lead to an interest in ornithology, because of the innumerable birds coming in, thanks to the flowers and fruits.

Natural manure consisting of household waste, dried leaves and flowers from the garden etc. is used in place of chemical and artificial manures. This does away with the problem of garbage disposal and the ill effects of chemical fertilizers are avoided. Shenoy followed the phrase "kasa dinda rasa" (best out of waste) very practically. It is not the availability of the water alone that is important but correct management. All the waste water from the kitchen etc. is diverted to the garden for the plants. This terrace garden also serves as a natural air conditioner for the house controlling the temperature inside it. The natural conditions created within the pots guard against extreme temperatures. Thus even seasonal fruits and vegetables are reaped almost throughout the year.

Shenoy has been given accolades by notable visitors to his garden like the then Union Agriculture Minister Balram Jakhar, Mr. Suresh Angadi, M.P, Bharatiya Janata Party . Dr. Vittal Rai, Vice-Chancellor of the Agriculture University, Dharwad, Dr. Beer Singh Chowdary, President of the Bharat Krishika Samaj , U.T. Alwa, Special Secretary to the Government of Karnataka, Forest Department Environment and Ecology. The Shenoy family believes that if everybody follows this practice, of having at least a small group of plants, will keep the cities cool, green and above all healthy.

Shenoy has also worked as one of the Directors of the Horticulture Department, Belgaum. Flower and Fruit shows and exhibitions and competitions have been organized every year in Hume Park, Club Road, Belgaum, under the able guidance and active participation of Shenoy. He organized, conducted and managed to dedicatedly work for the research and development of plants even amidst his busy schedule involving his activities of his office.

== Personal life ==
Shenoy married Aruna, daughter of Smt. Rukmini & Shri. Laxman Prabhu, Headmaster S.V.T. School , Karkala, in the year 1976. They have three children, Dr. Rashmi V. Shenoy, Chetan V. Shenoy and Anupkumar V. Shenoy.

== Institutions And Organisations ==
To quote, a few institutions and organisations in which he has put his heart and soul and worked hard for the welfare of the society at large, are as follows:

- Director, Students' Information & Guidance Bureau
- Founder President, Belgaum District Konkani Parishad, Belgaum.
- Member, Text Book Committee for Konkani Language in Karnataka State.
- Director, Kalasangam.
- Executive Member, All India Konkani Parishad, Panaji, Goa.
- Secretary, Belgaum Press Club, Belgaum.
- Secretary, Kanara Cultural Association.
- Vice-President, Consumer Organisation for Protection and Education (COPE), Belgaum.
- Founder Director, NORMCO, Belgaum.
- Founder Director, SPOCO, Sports School Chandargi, Belgaum.
- President, Terrace and Kitchen Garden Owners Association, Belgaum.
- Director, Sahitya Sampada, Belgaum.
- Director, Students' Helpine, Belgaum.
- Ex General Secretary, Belgaum Dist. Kannada Sahitya Parishat, Belgaum.
- Patron, Kannada Sahitya Parishat, Bangalore.
- Life Member, Bharatiya Vidya Bhavan, Mumbai.
- Ex General Secretary, Bharatiya Vidya Bhavan, Belgaum Kendra.
- Executive member, Ajanta Film Society, Belgaum
- Director, Board of Management, Belgaum Dist Horticulture Society, Belgaum
- Member, Belgaum District Postal Forum, Belgaum.
- Twice General Secretary, All India Kannada Sahitya Sammelana held at Belgaum.
- Worked as District Correspondent for Udayavani 'Daily', Manipal; 'Vishal Karnataka', Hubli; 'Navanadu Daily', Hubli; 'Gomantak Times', Goa; and Jwalamukhi Daily', Bangalore.
- Secretary, Regional Committee, Belgaum; First World Konkani Sammelan held at Mangalore in 1995.

and many more.
