= Vijayalakshmi Shibaroor =

Indian investigative journalist and television correspondent

- Born: April 3, 1979 (age 46); Shibarooru near Mangalore
- Occupation: Investigative correspondent
- Known for: Investigative journalism

Vijayalakshmi Shibaroor is a Special investigative correspondent in Vaicom18 network.

== Early life ==
She was born on 3 April 1979 in Shibarooru village near Mangalore. She completed her post-graduation in mass communication and Journalism from Mangala Gangotri in Mangalore University.

== Career ==
She started her career as an editor in Janavahini newspaper and then she joined Akashvani (radio broadcaster) as a program producer after one year, worked there for one year. Later, she joined Samyukta Karnataka and took the responsibility of Sapthahika, the supplement of Samyukta Karnataka. Later, she worked as a senior reporter cum anchor for 4 years in TV9 (Kannada) and after that, she joined ETV Kannada and worked for some years and she is now working as managing director in Vijaya Times.

== Notable works ==
She is a producer of an investigative program named Cover story which uncovers social issues like adulterated food, bonded child labor, and many other scams. She has exposed scams like lottery scams, betting scams, play home scam, water scams, Anganwadi scams, and food scams in her Cover story program. Apart from television, she has also worked in Print media where she worked as Magazine editor, General desk in charge.
