= Santosh Kumar Gulwadi =

Indian journalist, novelist (1938–2010)

- Born: 2 October 1938; Udupi, Karnataka, India
- Died: 7 December 2010 (aged 72); Bengaluru, Karnataka
- Citizenship: India
- Education: Bachelor of Commerce (University of Mysore); Bachelor of Laws (University of Mumbai); Postgraduate diploma (Bharatiya Vidya Bhavan)
- Occupations: Novelist, writer, columnist
- Spouse: Sudeshna
- Children: 2
- Writing career
- Language: Kannada
- Notable awards: Karnataka Saahitya Academy Award; Rajyotsava Award

Santosh Kumar Gulwadi was an Indian journalist and novelist. He wrote seven books including story compilations in Kannada.

== Early life ==
Santosh Kumar Gulwadi was born on 2 October 1938, to Ratnakarbhat Gulwadi (Father) and Shashikala Gulwadi (Mother). He was an editor in newspaper Prajavani, magazine Sudha, Vijay Sankeshwar's magazine Noothana and the first chief-editor of magazine Taranga, from 1982 to 1999.

== Bibliography ==
- Nañjuṇḍa siri : souvenir
- Gulvadi Venkatarao - Baduku baraha
- Modala Moggu
