= Mangala (magazine) =

- May 2018 edition's cover, of magazine
- Categories: Film
- Frequency: Weekly
- Format: Print (Paperback)
- Founder: Mangalam Publications
- Founded: 1969
- Final issue: 11 October 2023
- Company: Mangalam Publications
- Country: India
- Based in: Kottayam, Kerala
- Language: Kannada

Mangala was a weekly Kannada film magazine circulated in Karnataka, India.

The publisher temporarily halted its operations during the COVID lockdown but resumed publishing once restrictions were lifted. However, it permanently ceased publication in October 2023 due to rising operating costs and high maintenance charges.

== Background ==
Mangala was launched as a monthly magazine in 1969. It later changed its frequency to biweekly and then to weekly. The magazine (RNI:44741/89) is owned by Mangalam Publications (India) Pvt. Ltd., based in Kottayam, Kerala.

== Sister publications ==
- Balamangala, a defunct Kannada fortnightly children magazine

== See also ==
- List of Kannada-language magazines
- Media in Karnataka
- Media of India
- Roopatara, a Kannada monthly film magazine
