= HSK =

HSK may refer to:

== Sport ==
- Helsingfors Segelklubb, a Finnish sailing club
- Helsingfors Skridskoklubb, a Finnish figure skating club
- Henderson Silver Knights, an American hockey team
- Hadsten Sports Klub, a Danish multi-sports club

== Transport ==
- Hassocks railway station, Sussex, England
- Hung Shui Kiu station, Hong Kong
- Hung Shui Kiu stop, Hong Kong
- Huesca–Pirineos Airport, Aragon, Spain
- Handels-Stör-Kreuzer, a German auxiliary cruiser

== Other uses ==
- H. S. Krishnaswamy Iyengar
- Hanyu Shuiping Kaoshi or Chinese Proficiency Test
- Homoserine kinase, an enzyme
- Horrendous Space Kablooie, a Calvin and Hobbes reference to the Big Bang
- Hohlschaftkegel ("hollow shank taper"), a form of machine taper
