= Tunturu =

Indian bi-monthly children's magazine

- Cover of April 2018 issue
- Chief Editor: U. B. Rajalakshmi
- Staff writers: T. G. Shetty, Cheluvayya
- Categories: Children magazine
- Frequency: Bi-monthly
- Format: Print (Paperback), Online
- Publisher: Manipal Media Network Ltd. (MMNL)
- Founder: Manipal Media Network Ltd. (MMNL)
- Founded: 2000; 26 years ago
- First issue: January 2000
- Country: India
- Based in: Bengaluru, Karnataka
- Language: Kannada
- Website: MMNL Official website

Tunturu is a major Kannada bi-monthly children's magazine published in Karnataka, India, with its headquarters in Manipal, Karnataka.

For the past few years, Sandhya Pai has been the managing editor of the magazine.

The magazine has been out of print for four years due to COVID-19.

== History ==
The magazine was launched in January 2000 by Manipal Media Network Ltd. (MMNL).

== Sister publications ==
- Roopatara, a Kannada monthly film magazine
- Taranga, a Kannada weekly family interest magazine
- Tushara, a Kannada monthly literary magazine
- Udayavani, a Kannada daily newspaper

== See also ==
- Balamangala, a defunct Kannada fortnightly children magazine
- Chutuka, Kannada monthly children magazine
- List of Kannada-language magazines
- Media in Karnataka
- Media in India
