= Chutuka =

Kannada monthly children's magazine

- Editor: T. G. Narayana Gowda
- Categories: Children's magazine
- Frequency: Monthly
- Format: Print (Paperback)
- Publisher: T. G. Narayana Gowda
- Founded: 1991; 35 years ago
- Company: Apoorva Printers
- Country: India
- Based in: Bengaluru
- Language: Kannada

Chutuka is a Kannada monthly children's magazine circulated in Karnataka, India.

The magazine is subscribed to by women's educational institutions such as JSS College for Women and BMS College for Women.

== Background ==
Chutuka (RNI:KARKAN/2000/03139) was started in 1991 by N. Sundar Rajan of Sangama Publications and is published by Apoorva Printers, Bengaluru, Karnataka.

== See also ==
- Balamangala, a defunct Kannada fortnightly children magazine
- Champaka, a Kannada monthly children magazine
- Tunturu, a Kannada fortnightly children magazine
- List of Kannada-language magazines
- Media in Karnataka
- Media of India
