= Karmaveera =

- May 2018 edition's cover, of magazine
- Editor: G. Anil Kumar
- Categories: Family interest
- Frequency: Weekly
- Format: Print (Paperback), Online
- Publisher: Samyukta Karnataka,
- Founder: Loka Shikshana trust (established 27 April 1933)
- Founded: 1921; 105 years ago
- First issue: 1921
- Country: India
- Based in: Bengaluru
- Language: Kannada
- Website: Karmaveera

Karmaveera is a major Kannada weekly family magazine published in Karnataka, India, with its headquarters in Bengaluru, Karnataka. It is also published in Hubli, Davanagere, Gulbarga (now Kalaburagi), and Mangaluru districts of Karnataka.

== History ==
Karmaveera was first published in 1921. Ranganath Ramchandra Diwakar, a former president of the KPCC, established the ′Loka Shikshana Trust′ (meaning: World Education Trust) on 27 April 1933, which publishes both Kasthuri and Karmaveera.

Kannada writer and poet P. V. Acharya was one among the many editors of Karmaveera. Its current Editor is G. Anil Kumar.

== See also ==
- List of Kannada-language magazines
- Media in Karnataka
- Media of India
