= Slum Jagathu =

Kannada language magazine

Slum Jagathu (Slum World in English) is a monthly magazine published since 2000 in Bangalore, India, by Isaac Arul Selva, who lives in the Bangalore slums surrounding rich neighborhoods and IT companies. "This is a unique project for slum-dwellers by slum-dwellers", he says. "It is not just a magazine. It is a voice echoing the struggle of slum-dwellers. Our ultimate aim is to inspire a movement to fight for our basic rights and amenities."

The magazine, which has "For slum dwellers, by slum dwellers" as a motto, covers "sex workers, pourakarmikas, and slum demolitions, among others". It is printed in the local language, Kannada, and the local readership as of 2004 was quoted as 2500 monthly. The Hindu reported in 2011 that readership was about 2,000.

== See also ==
- List of Kannada-language magazines
- Media in Karnataka
