= Ravi Belagere =

Indian journalist, editor, writer (1958–2020)

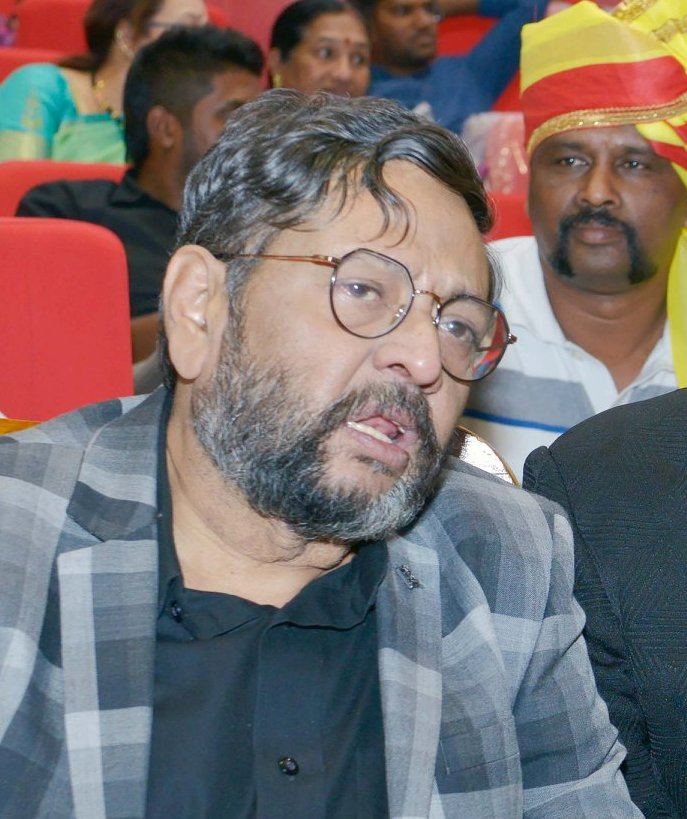
- Born: 15 March 1958; Ballari, Karnataka, India
- Died: 13 November 2020 (aged 62); Bangalore, Karnataka, India
- Occupations: Journalist, writer, novelist, actor
- Writing career
- Genres: Fiction, non-fiction
- Notable works: Himalayan Blunder; Nee Hinga Nodabyada Nanna; Bheema Theerada Hanthakaru; Indireya Maga Sanjaya; D Company
- Website: www.ravibelagere.com

Ravi Belagere (15 March 1958 – 13 November 2020) was an Indian writer and journalist based in Bangalore, Karnataka. He was the editor of the Kannada-language tabloid Hai Bangalore and fortnightly magazine O Manase. He founded Bhavana Prakashana, Prarthana School and Bhavana Audio Reach.

== Personal life ==
=== Early life ===
Belagere was born on 15 March 1958 at Sathyanarayanapete, in Bellary. He studied his high school education from Siddhaganga High School, Tumkur for couple of years and he failed in SSLC. Later, he completed his master's degree in history and archaeology from Veerashaiva College, Bellary.

=== Married life ===
Belagere has been married twice. His first wife is Lalitha and the second wife is Yashomati, who was his colleague at Hai Bangalore office. His first wife has three children namely Chethana Belagere (daughter), Bhavana Belagere (daughter) and Karna (son). His second wife Yashomati has a son named Himavanth. He was an ardent fan of Khushwant Singh and he said he was attracted to leftist ideology and he had no political leanings.

== Career ==
Belagere started his career as a lecturer of history, working as a lecturer of history in Bellary, Hassan and Hubli before heading to Bengaluru in 1984. After coming to Bengaluru, he started his own newspaper Hai Bangalore on September 25, 1995 along with R. T. Vittalamurthy, Ra. Somanath, Jogi and I. H. Sangam Dev which he published from his Padmanabhanagar office in Bengaluru. The columns like Love Lavike, Bottom Item and Khaas Baat apart from Papigala Lokadalli which was about the underworld, created many admirers and his paper was the largest circulated newspaper over the five years. After this success, he started a magazine O Manase which focused on difficulties and troubles of young people. Later, he produced several TV programs and acted in some movies.

== Literary works ==
Year	Title
1980	Daari (Collection of Stories)
1983	Agin Kavya (Collection of Poems) Golibaar (Novel); Vivaaha (Translation)
1984	Nakshatra Jaaridaaga (Translation)
1990	Arti (Novel)
1991	Pyaasa (Biography) Rajeev Hathye Yekayithu? Hegayithu? (History)
1995	Pa. Vem. Helida Kathe (Collection of Stories) Paapigala Lokadalli Part-1
1996	Mandovi (Novel)
1997	Khasabath 1996 (Biography) Paapigala Lokadalli Part-2; Khasabath 1997 (Biography); Khasabath 1998 (Biography)
1998	Lavalavike 1 Maatagaathi (Novel); Mysore Serial Killer Raveendra (Murder mystery)
1999	Omerta (Novel) Himalayan Blunder (Translation); 17 Day war in Kargil (War Story)
2000	Company of Women (Translation) Sarpa Sambandha (Novel); Sanjaya (Biography)
2001	Ottaare Kathegalu (Collection of Stories) Timepass (Translation); Bheema Theerada Hanthakaru (Gangster History); Keli (Collection of Articles); Paapada Hoovu Phoolan (Biography)
2002	Muslim (War Story) Bottom Item Part 1 (Collection of Articles); Indireya Maga Sanjaya (Life Story); Raja Rahasya (Translation)
2003	Heli Hogu Karana (Novel) Gandhi Hathye & Godse (Life Story); Nee hinga nodabyada Nanna (Novel); Khasabath 1999 (Life Story); Khasabath 2000 (Life Story); Bottom Item Part 2 (Collection of Articles)
2004	Lavalavike Part 2
2005	Godfather (Translation) Black Friday (Translation); Paapigala Lokadalli (Crime)
2006	Bottom Item Part 3 (Collection of Articles)
2007	Diana (Biography) Hanthaki I Love You (Translation); Baba Bedroom Hathyakaanda (Investigation); Khasabath 2001 (Life Story); Reshme Rumalu (Translation); Manase (Audio CD)
2008	Khasabath 2002 (Life Story) Chalam (Biography); Dangeya Dinagalu (Translation of "The Devil's Wind" by Manohar Malgonkar); D company (Crime)
2009	Neena Pakistana (War) Avanobbanidda Godse (History); Major Sandeep Hathye (War); Lavalavike Part 3 Bottom Item Part 4 (Collection of Articles); First Half
2010	KamaRaja Marga (Novel) Anil Lad Matthu Nalavattu Kallaru (Novel)
2011	Bottom Item Part 5 (Collection of Articles) Lavalavike Part 4 Khasabath 2003 (Life Story); Khasabath 2004 (Life Story); Bottom Item Part 6 (Collection of Articles)
2012	Kanase (Audio CD) Udugore (Selected Writings); Himagni (Novel); Olave (Audio CD); Amma Sikkidlu (Novel); Kalpana Vilasa (Biography); Khasabath 2005 (Life Story); RangaVilasa Bangaleya Kolegalu (Crime); Idu Jeeva, Iduve Jeevana (Biography); Pramod Mahajan Hathye (Translation)
2013	Enaythu Magale (Life Story) Bottom Item Part 7 (Collection of Articles)
2016	Aatma (Novel) Bottom Item Part 8 (Collection of Articles); Samadhana; Khasabath 2006 (Life Story); Raj, Leela Vinod (Biography) idli vada deadly murder (crime )
2019	Siddharth Aa Mukha ( Non fiction )

== Media works ==
- He was the producer and narrator of the crime investigation show Crime Diary which aired on ETV Kannada and he has also given his voice for the movie Deadly Soma
- He hosted a TV program Endhu Mareyada Haadu, Break fast which aired on Janashri TV
- He has acted in movies like Ganda Hendathi, Madesha and Vaarasdhara and also he has played the role of a judge in Muktha Muktha serial
- He has also produced a TV programs such as Night Beat Crime, Heli Hogu Karana which is based on his own novel on Suvarna TV
- He has also conducted a radio program Bel Belagge Ravi Belagere on Akashvani.
- He was a participant in Bigg Boss Kannada seventh season.

== Awards and honours ==
Award	Work and Year
First Prize in Masti Story Competition	Vandya –1990
Karnataka Sahitya Academy Award	Vivaha (Translation) (1984) Pa. Vem. Helida Kathe (Collection Of stories) –1997
Shivarama Karantha Award	Nee Hinga Nodabyada Nanna (novel)–2004
Computer Excellency award from Central Government (for his school)	2005
Karnataka Media Academy Award for Lifetime achievement	2008
Rajyothsava award	2010
Kempegowda Award	2011

== Controversies ==
In December 2017, Ravi Belagere was accused of contracting the killing of his former colleague and journalist Sunil Heggaravalli. It was alleged that he had paid Rs 15,000 as advance to the contract killers and also provided them with a country-made gun to kill his fellow journalist. He was arrested by the Bangalore Central Crime Branch under IPC Section 307 (attempt to murder), 120B (criminal conspiracy) and sections under the Arms Act. The officials seized a revolver and 53 bullets, a double barrel gun and 41 bullets from his Bengaluru residence. He spent many days at the Parappana Agrahara central jail in connection with the case.

He wrote a controversial article on the actor Rupini which invited strong criticism.

Belagere directed the movie Mukhyamantri I Love You, which was based on the love story of H D Kumaraswamy and actor Radhika Kumaraswamy. The movie never hit the screen as H. D. Deve Gowda brought a stay on its release.

In December 2010, he made a derogatory comment on Pratap Simha, then a writer at Vijaya Karnataka. It led to the resignation of Simha, the editor-in-chief Vishweshwar Bhat, P. Thayagaraj and several others. After that, Pratap Simha hit back at Ravi Belagere on his website and the spat between the two continued for a while.

He had a spat with the producers of the movies such as Bheema Theeradalli and Om (Kannada film) over alleged copyright infringement of his works.

== Death ==
Ravi died at 2:30 AM on 13 November 2020 due to heart attack in Bangalore. He was 62.
