= G. Anil Kumar =

Indian journalist

G. Anil Kumar (Bangalore, India) is noted Indian journalist, columnist and writer. He is the editor of Karmaveera, a 100-year-old Kannada weekly (founded in 1921). He was previously an associate editor of Samyukta Karnataka, the oldest Kannada daily. He is also the founder-editor of its widely acclaimed Saturday supplement for children, Kindari Jogi.

He has contributed many articles to Indian and foreign newspapers, magazines and websites. Trained in computer engineering, G Anil Kumar was with the booming software industry in 1990s. Later he changed his field of work to form a think tank with N. S. Rajaram in Bangalore. Before joining Samyukta Karnataka, he was associated with The Times of India, Kannada daily Usha Kirana and many other papers and magazines. He was also a founder director of a policy research organization.

== Kindari Jogi ==
In April 2007, Kumar created an educational magazine for schoolchildren called Kindari Jogi, an 8-page, all-color weekly educational supplement for young readers. The magazine was named after the Kannada term for the German legend 'Pied Piper'.
