= Prajavani =

Kannada daily newspaper

- Type: Morning Daily Newspaper
- Format: Broadsheet
- Owner: The Printers (Mysore) Private Limited
- Founder: K.N. Guruswamy
- Editor: K.N. Shanth Kumar
- Founded: 1948; 78 years ago
- Political alignment: Independent
- Language: Kannada
- Headquarters: M. G. Road, Bengaluru, Karnataka, India
- Circulation: 355,888 (as of 2022)
- Readership: 2.13 million (IRS 2019 Average Issue Readership)
- OCLC number: 37626596
- Website: www.prajavani.net
- Free online archives: epaper.prajavani.net

Prajavani (Kannada: ಪ್ರಜಾವಾಣಿ, romanized: Prajāvāṇi, lit. 'Voice of the People') is a Kannada-language broadsheet daily newspaper published in Karnataka, India. Having a readership of over 2.13 million, it is one of the largest circulated newspapers in the state.

== History and ownership ==
Prajavani was founded in 1948 in Bangalore by K.N. Guruswamy. The Printers (Mysore) Private Limited, the company that owns the newspaper, continues to be privately held by members of the founding family.

== Stance ==
Prajavani (PV) has a history of being a politically independent newspaper, although it tends to opine with a liberal tilt. It is known for espousing the causes of Dalits, encouraging women's empowerment and taking pro-poor positions on economic issues. It has managed to maintain an independent position, despite an increasingly polarised media landscape in Karnataka. Prajavani uses the tagline "the most trusted Kannada daily newspaper", which appears below its masthead.

== Position in the market ==
Prajavani was the Kannada newspaper for decades, until it was overtaken in circulation by Vijaya Karnataka (VK) in 2004. The gulf between PV and the upstart VK became huge for a while, but the two newspapers appear to be competing much more closely as of 2014, with PV having significantly recovered ground according to industry numbers. Some analysts have also attributed this to the launch of Vijaya Vani, by the original owner of Vijaya Karnataka, Vijay Sankeshwar and his VRL Group, which has apparently eaten into the readership of Vijaya Karnataka. Other regional competitors include Udayavani, Varthabharathi, Kannada Prabha and Samyukta Karnataka.

== Sister publications ==
- Deccan Herald, a daily English newspaper
- Sudha, a Kannada weekly magazine
- Mayura, a Kannada monthly magazine

== See also ==
- List of Kannada-language newspapers
- List of Kannada-language magazines
- List of newspapers in India
- Media in Karnataka
- Media of India
