= Abbani =

- village
- Location in Karnataka, India Abbani (India)
- Coordinates: 13.103870°N 78.218920°E
- Country: India
- State: Karnataka
- District: Kolar
- Talukas: Kolar

Government
  - Body: Village Panchayat

Languages
  - Official: Kannada
- Time zone: UTC+5:30 (IST)
- Nearest city: Kolar
- Civic agency: Village Panchayat

Abbani is a village in the southern state of Karnataka, India. It is located in the Kolar taluk of Kolar district in Karnataka.

== Notable people ==
- A.N.Prahlada Rao, Author and crossword constructor

== See also ==
- Kolar
- Districts of Karnataka
