= Hai Bangalore =

Indian newspaper

- Type: Weekly
- Format: Print
- Owner(s): Bhavana Prakahana
- Publisher: Bhavana Prakahana
- Editor: Ravi Belagere (Editor-in-chief)
- Founded: 1995
- Language: Kannada
- Headquarters: Bangalore, Karnataka
- Country: India
- Website: none

Hai Bangalore is a mass circulation weekly Kannada language tabloid published in Bangalore. It was founded by Ravi Belagere along with R. T. Vittalamurthy, MaSuri, & Jogi in 1995 which he published from his Padmanabhanagar office in Bengaluru. The columns like Love Lavike, Bottom Item and Khaas Baat apart from Papigala Lokadalli which was about the underworld, created many admirers and his paper was the most-circulated newspaper over the five years. The tabloid articles include reports about scandals, scams, affairs, background politics, murders, crime to the public eye, although the accuracy of the reports is often questionable. Apart from these reports, it contains columns and articles about various fields like psychology, sports, science and cinema news.

In 2003, its coverage accounted for 13 of the 46 complaints investigated by a Press Council of India inquiry into defamatory and damaging journalism in the southern states of India.

== Sister publications ==
- O Manase, a fortnightly Kannada language youth magazine

== See also ==
- List of Kannada-language newspapers
- List of Kannada-language magazines
- List of newspapers in India
- Media in Karnataka
- Media of India
