= P. V. Acharya =

Padigaru Venkataramana Acharya
- Born: 15 February 1915; Kunjibettu village, Udupi District, Karnataka, India
- Died: 4 April 1992 (aged 77); Hubli, Karnataka, India
- Occupations: Journalist, writer, poet, thinker, mentor
- Writing career
- Pen name: Langulacharya, Paa vem Acharya, Radha Krishna
- Genres: Fiction, poetry, essays, articles, science
- Notable awards: B.D. Goenka Award (1992); Karnataka Sahitya Academy Award Honorary (1981); Rajyotsava Award (1989); Karnataka Sahitya Academy Diamond Jubilee Medal (1977)

Padigaru Venkataramana Acharya, also known by his pen name Langulacharya, was a Kannada and Tulu scribe, journalist, writer and poet who received the B.D. Goenka award for journalism in 1992.

== Biography ==
=== Early life, education & family ===
P.V. Acharya was born on 15 February 1915 in the town of Kunjibettu in Udupi district near Mangalore in Karnataka. He was born to Padigaru Laxminarayanacharya (father) and Seetamma (mother). He was the youngest of five children and their only son. Acharya was five years old when his father died. With some external financial help from extended family & well-wishers, he studied until high school. He passed matriculation (10th standard) with a 100 percent score in mathematics and 85 percent in English. Impressed with his results, his school's principal offered him to get admission into Mangalore's St. Aloysius College with a full scholarship. However, Acharya could not accept the scholarship as it would have been impossible for him to manage other living expenses while studying in the more expensive city of Mangalore. He also had the responsibility of taking care of his family. He focused on his career instead.

=== Career ===
P.V. Acharya started his career as a primary school teacher in 1932 and quit the job in 1933. He joined Tulunadu Press as an accountant. Which helped him to learn about publishing. He also had a short stint as editor of “Antaranga” previously. He worked as an accountant at several places after that until finally joining Samyukta Karnataka Press as a supervisor for the jobs division in 1942. Luck came his way when H.R. Purohit, the then editor-in-chief of Karmaveera, a popular Kannada weekly magazine of that time had to take a 6 week-long vacation for personal reasons. P.V. Acharya was asked to fill in for H.R. Purohit. From 1947 onward he worked for Karmaveera full-time and penned several satirical and gabby articles (ಹರಟೆ) under the pen name of Langulacharya. His articles gained instant popularity with the mass and they are regarded as being instrumental in increasing the magazine's circulation. His major contributions to Kannada literature and journalism were through the Kannada monthly digest called “Kasturi”, which he modelled after the popular English digest – “Reader’s Digest”. He graced the position of founder-editor for the magazine from 1956 to 1975. During his tenure at Kasturi, the magazine saw success in Kannada publications. Post-retirement from Kasturi as editor, he continued to contribute to the magazine via a unique section called “Padartha Chintamani”, which explored the origins, contextual meanings, and historical references of words. Later, a collection of these articles was published as two-volume book series. The Media and Public Interest Foundation of Hubli have also set up "Pavem Vichara Vedike" since 2009, which presents the "Pavem Award" for lifetime achievement and upcoming talent categories in the Kannada language.

== Bibliography ==
=== Edited Publications ===
- Kasturi (1956–1975)
- Karmaveera (1947–1955)
- Antaranga (1932)

=== Collection of Poems ===
- Housing Colony
- Pengopadeshagalu

=== Collection of Stories ===
- Hindu-Muslim and other short stories

=== Linguistic Work ===
- Padartha Chintamani Vol-I and Vol-II

=== Prominent Articles, Essays and Other ===
- Nanna Drushtiyalli Dharma
- Manavapravrutti mattu maulyagalu
- Brahmanarenu Madabeku?

=== Science ===
- Vijnana Vismaya

== Awards and recognition ==
=== National Awards ===
- B.D. Goenka Award, 1992

=== State Level Awards ===
- Karnataka Rajyotsava Award, 1989
- Karnataka Sahitya Academy Honorary Award, 1981
- Karnataka Sahitya Academy Diamond Jubilee Medal, 1977
