= Udayavani =

Indian newspaper

- Type: Daily newspaper
- Format: Broadsheet
- Publisher: Manipal Media Network Ltd. (MMNL)
- Editor: Ravishankar K Bhat
- Language: Kannada
- Headquarters: Manipal, Karnataka
- Circulation: Manipal, Bengaluru, Mumbai, Hubballi, Gulbarga, Davangere
- OCLC number: 801791748
- Website: www.udayavani.com

Udayavani, launched in January 1970 by T. Mohandas Pai and T. Satish U Pai, is a Kannada daily published by Manipal Media Network Ltd. (MMNL). With editions from Manipal, Bengaluru, Mumbai, Hubballi, Davanagere, and Gulbarga, it reaches a combined circulation of over 300,000 copies. Known as the leading newspaper in coastal Karnataka, Udayavani also has a strong presence in Bengaluru and other regions, enjoying wide readership and brand recognition among readers and advertisers. MMNL, established in 1948, has grown from a small printer in Manipal to a key media player in Karnataka's print and digital spheres.

== Background ==
Udayavani is published by Manipal Media Network Limited promoted by The Manipal Group – a diversified multi-industry conglomerate headquartered at Manipal, Udupi District, Karnataka.

== Sister publications ==
Manipal Media Network Ltd. also publishes

- Roopatara, a cinema monthly magazine, in Kannada
- Taranga, a family weekly magazine, in Kannada
- Tunturu, an illustrated children's magazine, in Kannada
- Tushara, a monthly magazine, in Kannada

== See also ==
- List of Kannada-language newspapers
- List of Kannada-language magazines
- List of newspapers in India
- Media in Karnataka
- Mangalore
- Media of India
