= Tushara (magazine) =

Monthly literary magazine

- May 2018 edition's cover, of magazine
- Managing Editor: Sandhya Pai
- Former editors: K. Shivaram Karanth; Girish Karnad; U. R. Ananthamurthy; Satish U. Pai (ex-Managing Editor); A. Eshwaraiya (ex-Assistant Editor); Udayananda Bhandary
- Categories: Literary
- Frequency: Monthly
- Format: Print (Paperback), Online
- Publisher: Manipal Media Network Ltd. (MMNL)
- Founder: Manipal Media Network Ltd. (MMNL)
- Founded: April 1973; 51 years ago
- Country: India
- Based in: Manipal, Karnataka
- Language: Kannada
- Website: MMNL Official website
- OCLC: 34468126

Tushara is a major Kannada monthly literary magazine published in Karnataka, India, with its headquarters in Manipal, Karnataka.

The magazine features columns such as ′Sarasa′ (meaning: Naughty), ′Mathininda Lekhanige′ (meaning: From speech to pen), ′Sahitya Avalokana′ (meaning: Literature overview), ′Kannada Kathaloka′ (meaning: Kannada story world), ′Makkala Kathe′ (meaning: Children's stories), ′Vishwa Kathe′ (meaning: World story) and ′Masadamathu′ (meaning: indestructible words).

Sandhya Pai is the managing editor of the magazine.

== History ==
The magazine, launched in April 1973, is the second publication of Manipal Media Network Ltd. (MMNL).

== Sister publications ==
- Roopatara, a Kannada monthly film magazine
- Taranga, a Kannada weekly family interest magazine
- Tunturu, a Kannada bi-monthly children magazine
- Udayavani, a Kannada daily newspaper

== See also ==
- Mayura, a Kannada monthly literary magazine
- List of Kannada-language magazines
- Media in Karnataka
- Media in India
