= Roopatara =

Indian monthly film magazine

- Cover of April 2018 issue
- Managing Editor: Sandhya Pai
- Staff writers: Ravi Hedge (Group Editor)
- Categories: Film
- Frequency: Monthly
- Format: Print (Paperback), Online
- Publisher: Manipal Media Network Ltd.
- Founder: Manipal Media Network Ltd.
- Founded: April 1977; 49 years ago
- Country: India
- Based in: Manipal, Karnataka
- Language: Kannada
- Website: Roopatara Official website Manipal medial Network Official website

Roopatara is a Kannada monthly film magazine, published in Karnataka, India, which has its headquarters in Manipal, Karnataka.

Sandhya Pai is the managing editor of the magazine.

== History ==
Roopatara was launched in April 1977 in Manipal, by Manipal Media Network Ltd. The first edition's cover page featured Rajkumar.

== Sister publications ==
- Taranga, a Kannada weekly family interest magazine
- Tunturu, a Kannada bi-monthly children magazine
- Tushara, a Kannada monthly literary magazine
- Udayavani, a Kannada daily newspaper

== See also ==
- Mangala, a Kannada monthly film magazine
- List of Kannada-language magazines
- Media in Karnataka
