= O Manase =

Indian youth magazine

- May 2018 edition's cover, of magazine
- CEO, Editor: Ravi Belagere
- Frequency: Fortnightly
- Format: Print (Paperback), web
- Country: India
- Language: Kannada
- Website: Official website Publisher website

O Manase (meaning: O Mind) is a Kannada-language fortnightly youth magazine published in Karnataka, India. Journalist Ravi Belagere was the CEO and editor of the magazine.

== Sister publications ==
- Hai Bangalore, a weekly Kannada language tabloid

== See also ==
- List of Kannada-language magazines
- Media in Karnataka
- Media of India
