= Taranga (magazine) =

Kannada weekly family interest magazine, published in Karnataka, India

- January 2007 edition's cover of magazine, on occasion of its 25th anniversary
- Managing Editor: Sandhya Pai
- Former editors: H. M. Nayak; K. Shivaram Karanth; Patil Puttappa; Santosh Kumar Gulwadi
- Categories: Family interest
- Frequency: Weekly
- Format: Print (Paperback), Online
- Publisher: Manipal Media Network Ltd. (MMNL)
- Founder: Manipal Media Network Ltd. (MMNL)
- Founded: 2 January 1983; 43 years ago
- Country: India
- Based in: Manipal, Karnataka
- Language: Kannada
- Website: Taranga Official website MMNL Official website

Taranga or Tharanga is a major Kannada weekly family interest magazine published in Karnataka, India, with its headquarters in Manipal, Karnataka.

Taranga covers topics such as short stories, poems, serialized fiction, spirituality, health, travel and technology, cookery, fashion, beauty, film news, sports, culture etc. It publishes cartoons too, on politics and society.

For the past 15 years, Sandhya Pai has been the managing editor, of the magazine.

== History ==
Taranga was initially launched on a trial basis on 28 November 1982 in Manipal and had its official launch on 2 January 1983. The inaugural price of the first edition was ₹1.50.

== Sister publications ==
- Roopatara, a Kannada monthly film magazine
- Tunturu, a Kannada bi-monthly children magazine
- Tushara, a Kannada monthly literary magazine
- Udayavani, a Kannada daily newspaper

== See also ==
- List of Kannada-language magazines
- Media in Karnataka
- Media of India
