= Haleyuru =

- village
- Interactive map of Haleyuru
- Country: India
- State: Karnataka
- District: Mysore
- Talukas: Krishnarajanagara

Government
  - Type: Panchayat raj
  - Body: Gram panchayat

Population (2001)
  - Total: 5,581

Languages
  - Official: Kannada
- Time zone: UTC+5:30 (IST)
- ISO 3166 code: IN-KA
- Vehicle registration: KA
- Website: karnataka.gov.in

Haleyuru is a village in the southern state of Karnataka, India. It is located in the Krishnarajanagara taluk of Mysore district.

== Demographics ==
As of 2001 India census, Haleyuru had a population of 5581 with 2753 males and 2828 females.

== See also ==
- Mysore
- Districts of Karnataka
