= Karnataka Sahitya Academy =

- Formation: 1961
- Headquarters: Kannada Bhavan, Bengaluru
- Location: Bengaluru, Karnataka
- Region served: India
- Official language: Kannada
- President: B.V.Vasanthakumar
- Parent organisation: Directorate of Kannada and Culture, Government of Karnataka
- Website: karnatakasahithyaacademy.org

Karnataka Sahitya Academy is an autonomous organization set up by the government of Karnataka to promote Kannada literature and recognize literary merit by giving awards. It is fully funded by the Directorate of Kannada and Culture, Government of Karnataka. Set up in 1961 as "Mysore State Sahitya Academy" it was renamed as Karnataka Sahitya Academy when the name of the Mysore State was changed to Karnataka in 1973. In 1977 the Government of Karnataka made amendments to its constitution and printed a Charter of the Academies. According to this Charter: (a) the President and Members of Sahitya Academy are nominated by the government (b) the academy can form an executive committee to take care of its day-to-day affairs (c) it also has the authority to form sub-committees as and when required, and (d) the president, the registrar and the finance board members are the officials of the academy, with the registrar functioning as its chief executive.

== Karnataka Sahitya Academy Awards ==
One of the major functions of the academy is to recognize literary merit by giving Karnataka Sahitya Academy Awards in various genres, as well as for total contribution of a writer to Kannada literature. The Karnataka Sahitya Academy Award, given since 1983, is regarded as one of the most prestigious literary awards in Kannada.

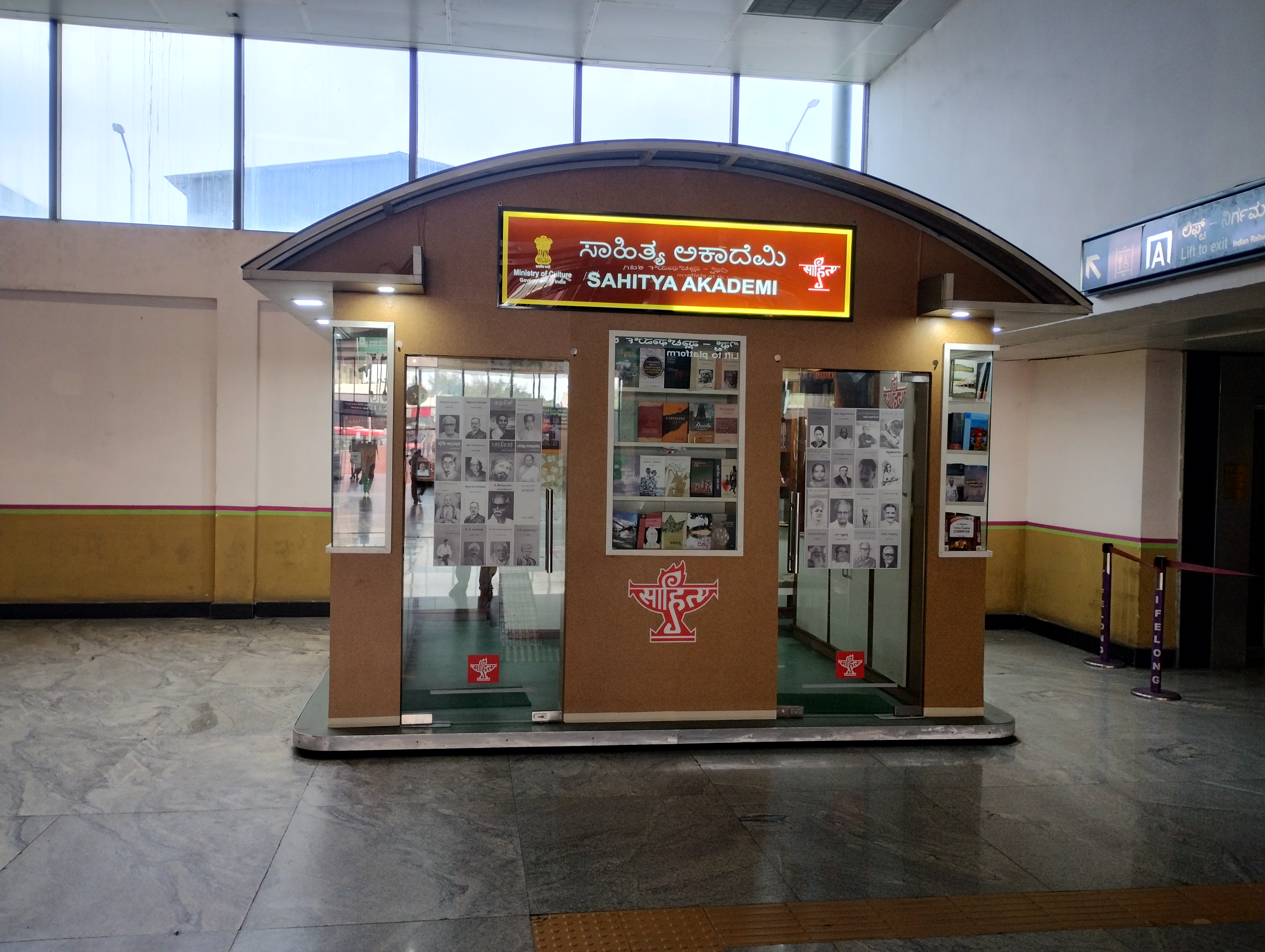
A Karnataka Sahitya Academy store at Majestic metro station, Bangalore (2024)
