= Vijaya Karnataka =

Indian newspaper

- Type: Daily newspaper
- Format: Broadsheet, Online
- Owner: The Times Group
- Publisher: Lokesh K V
- Editor: Sudarshan Channangihalli
- Founded: 4 October 1999; 27 years ago
- Language: Kannada
- Headquarters: 74/2, Sanjana Plaza, 4th & 5th Floor, Elephant Rock Road, Jayanagar 3rd block, Bengaluru-560011
- Website: www.vijaykarnataka.com
- Free online archives: www.vijaykarnatakaepaper.com

Vijaya Karnataka is a Kannada language newspaper published from a number of cities in Karnataka, India. The newspaper is published from Bengaluru, Hubballi, Mangaluru, Shivamogga, Kalaburagi, Gangavathi, Belagavi, Davanagere, Hassan, Chitradurga. It was started by VRL group, headed by entrepreneur and politician, Vijay Sankeshwar in October 1999. The newspaper along with sister publications (Vijay Times) was purchased by the Bennett, Coleman & Co. Ltd., publishers of India's leading newspaper, The Times of India in 2006.

== Controversy ==
In the March 28, 2020 edition of Vijaya Karnataka, it criticised the Muslim community and blamed it for the spread of COVID-19. The Press Council of India has issued a bailable warrant against the editor of Vijaya Karnataka, for not appearing for proceedings in a hate speech complaint against an article published by the newspaper.

== See also ==
- Chanakyaloka
- List of Kannada-language newspapers
- List of Kannada-language magazines
- List of newspapers in India
- Media in Karnataka
- Media of India
