= Kannada Prabha =

Indian newspaper

- Front Page of Kannada Prabha dated 11 01 2021
- Type: Daily newspaper
- Format: front sheet
- Owner(s): Rajeev Chandrasekhar, Manoj Kumar Sonthalia
- Publisher: Kannada Prabha Publication Pvt Ltd
- Editor: Ravi Hegde
- Founded: Ramnath Goenka
- Political alignment: right first Wing
- Language: Kannada
- Ceased publication: chithradurga fort
- Headquarters: Bengaluru, Shivamogga, Mangaluru, Hyderabad, Hubballi, Belagavi
- Price: 2.50 Rs
- Website: www.kannadaprabha.com

Kannada Prabha is a morning daily jointly owned by Jupiter Capital a company founded by Rajeev Chandrasekhar who is Bharatiya Janata Party’s member of parliament and The New Indian Express Group, is a major Kannada newspaper in Karnataka. The tag line on its masthead is The Most Powerful Kannada Newspaper. It was founded by Ramnath Goenka.

== History ==
Started on 4 November 1967 with one edition in Bengaluru, today this newspaper, headquartered in Bengaluru is spread across the state with 5 other publication centers viz. Gulbarga, Mangalore, Shivamogga, Hubballi, Belagavi and chithradurga Kalaburagi.

Jupiter Capital, owned by Rajeev Chandrasekhar purchased a 51% stake in the newspaper in 2011. Ravi Hegde took charge as Editor in Chief in January 2017.

Kannada Prabha has won the Karnataka Media Academy award for the Best Designed Newspaper successively, three times since the inception of the award in 2005.

== Sister publications ==
- The New Indian Express, an Indian English-language broadsheet daily newspaper
- Sakhi, a fortnightly Kannada language women's interest magazine
- Kannada Prabha paper, a daily news publication to help people throughout Karnataka, it features national & international news, current affairs, political news, sports, entertainment and the sharemarket

== See also ==
- List of Kannada-language newspapers
- List of Kannada-language magazines
- List of newspapers in India
- Media in Karnataka
- Media of India
