= Mayura (magazine) =

- May 2018 edition's cover, of magazine
- Chief Editor: K. N. Tilak Kumar
- Categories: Literary
- Frequency: Monthly
- Format: Print (Paperback), Online
- Publisher: The Printers, Mysore
- Founder: The Printers, Mysore
- Founded: 1968; 58 years ago
- Country: India
- Based in: Mysuru, Karnataka
- Language: Kannada
- Website: Mayura Official website Publisher website

Mayura is a major Kannada monthly literary magazine published in Karnataka, India, with its headquarters in Mysuru, Karnataka. It is also published in Davanagere, Gulbarga, Mangaluru, Hubli, Mumbai, New Delhi, Kolkata, Chennai and Hyderabad.

The magazine includes novels, stories (detective, scientific, and secular), short stories, children's stories, comedy write-ups, film reviews, celebrity interviews, serials/soaps and more. It often publishes stories translated from Telugu, Tamil, Malayalam, Hindi, Marathi, English, and other languages.

== History ==
Mayura was started in 1968 by The Printers, Mysore (estd. 1948).

Past writers of the magazine include P. Lankesh, K. P. Poornachandra Tejaswi, Goruru Ramaswamy Iyengar, Anupama Niranjana, M. K. Indira, Jayanth Kaikini, Besagarahalli Ramanna, T. K. Rama Rao, Fakir Mohammad Katpadi, Bolwar Mahammad Kunhi, Veerabhadrappa, Baraguru Ramachandrappa, Beechi, Nagathihalli Chandrashekhar, M.H. Nayak Baada, Na D'Souza, and Gopalakrishna Pai.

== Sister publications ==
- Deccan Herald, an English daily newspaper
- Sudha, Kannada weekly magazine
- Prajavani, Kannada daily newspaper

== See also ==
- List of Kannada-language magazines
- Tushara, a Kannada monthly literary magazine
