= Sudha (magazine) =

Weekly magazine from Bangalore

- Categories: Current affair magazine
- Frequency: Weekly
- Format: Print (Paperback)
- Publisher: The Printers (Mysore) Pvt. Ltd
- Founded: 1965; 61 years ago
- First issue: 11 January 1965
- Country: India
- Based in: Karnataka
- Language: Kannada
- Website: Sudha
- OCLC: 35813185

Sudha is a Kannada weekly magazine published in Bangalore, India.

== History and profile ==
Sudha was established in 1965. The first issue appeared on 11 January 1965. It is published by The Printers (Mysore) Pvt. Ltd. The magazine covers articles on current affairs. As of January 2014, the magazine had completed 50 years in publication.

== Cartoonists ==
Sudha publishes a large number of cartoons, especially political cartoons. Some of its cartoonists include GM Bomnalli, V.Gopal, Prakash Shetty, Devidas Suvarna, Kandikatla, Indrali Guru, and Halambi etc. There are some cartoonists whose cartoons were printed in the magazine for first time. One of them is Vasuki CG.

== Sister publications ==
- Deccan Herald, English Newspaper
- Prajavani, Kannada daily newspaper
- Mayura, Kannada Monthly

== See also ==
- List of Kannada-language magazines
- Media in Karnataka
- Media in India
