= Samyukta Karnataka =

Indian newspaper

Samyuktha Karnataka

- Type: Morning Daily Newspaper
- Format: Broadsheet
- Owner(s): Loka Shikshana trust
- Publisher: Loka Shikshana trust
- Founded: 1921; 104 years ago by Loka Shikshana Trust
- Political alignment: Right leaning
- Language: Kannada
- Headquarters: Koppikar Road, Hubballi
- OCLC number: 12620822
- Website: epaper.samyukthakarnataka.com

Samyukta Karnataka is a major Kannada newspaper which has its headquarters in Hubballi, Karnataka. It is also published from Bengaluru, Mangaluru, Bagalkot, Kalaburgi and Davanagere. The editor is Mahabala Seetalbhavi (Mahabaleshwar V.Bhat). The newspaper is also available in an e-format on the official website.

Samyukta Karnataka was first published in 1921. It has its origins in the Indian Independence movement starting with an objective to promote ideas of nationalism.

== Sister publications ==
- Karmaveera, a weekly mag

Cc

- Kasthuri, a monthly magazine

== See also ==
- List of Kannada-language newspapers
- List of Kannada-language magazines
- List of newspapers in India
- Media in Karnataka
- Media of India
