= List of Kannada-language magazines =

This is a list of Kannada-language magazines.

== India ==
Name	Kannada name	Frequency	Publisher/parent company	Established	Ref.
Balamangala	ಬಾಲಮಂಗಳ	Fortnightly	Mangalam Publications	1969	
Champak	ಚಂಪಕ	Fortnightly	Japan Press Group	1969	
Chutuka	ಚುಟುಕ	Monthly	Apoorva Printers	1991	
Grihshobha	ಗೃಹಶೋಭಾ	Biweekly	Delhi Press Group	1979	
Karmaveera	ಕರ್ಮವೀರ	Weekly	Loka Shikshana trust	1921	
Kasthuri	ಕಸ್ತೂರಿ	Monthly	Loka Shikshana trust	1921	
Mangala	ಮಂಗಳ	Weekly	Mangalam Publications	-NA-	
Mayura	ಮಯೂರ	Monthly	The Printers, Mysore	1968	
O Manase	ಓ ಮನಸೇ	Fortnightly	Bhavana Printers	2003	
Roopatara	ರೂಪತಾರ	Monthly	Manipal Media Network Ltd. (MMNL)	1977	
Sakhi	ಸಖಿ	Fortnightly	The New Indian Express	-NA-	
Slum Jagathu	ಸ್ಲಂ ಜಗತ್ತು	-NA-	Isaac Arul Selva	-NA-	
Sudha	ಸುಧಾ	Weekly	The Printers, Mysore	1965	
Taranga	ತರಂಗ	Weekly	Manipal Media Network Ltd. (MMNL)	1983	
Tunturu	ತುಂತುರು	Bi-monthly	Manipal Media Network Ltd. (MMNL)	2000	
Tushara	ತುಷಾರ	Monthly	Manipal Media Network Ltd. (MMNL)	1973	

== See also ==
- Media in Karnataka
- List of Kannada films
- List of Kannada newspapers
- List of Kannada radio stations
- List of Kannada television channels
- List of magazines in India
