= Media in Karnataka =

Karnataka has been a leading state in electronic communications, in India, since the start of first private radio station in Mysore, in 1935.

== Newspapers ==
The era of Kannada newspapers in Karnataka started in 1843 when Hermann Mögling, a missionary from Basel Mission, published the first Kannada newspaper, Mangalooru Samachara, from Mangalore. The first Kannada magazine, Mysuru Vrittanta Bodhini, was started by Bhashyam Bhashyacharya in Mysore. Shortly after Indian Independence in 1948, K.N. Guruswamy started the company The Printers, Mysore Pvt. Ltd. publishing two newspapers Deccan Herald (in English) and Prajavani (in Kannada). Times of India is the largest selling English newspaper in Karnataka. Tabloids including Lankesh Patrike and Hai Bangalore Adi Jambava Jagruti emphasize controversial topics. Sudharma, the only daily newspaper published in Sanskrit in India, is printed and distributed from Mysore.

== Television ==
Udaya TV was the first satellite channel to broadcast in Kannada.

Vistara News is a 24*7 Kannada news channel based in Karnataka

== Radio ==
All India Radio started in Mysore, and has been functional in Bangalore since 1955. Radio City FM was the first private radio station in Karnataka, beginning broadcasting in 2001.

== See also ==
- List of Kannada films
- List of Kannada magazines
- List of Kannada newspapers
- Media of India
