= List of Marathi-language newspapers =

Part of a series on

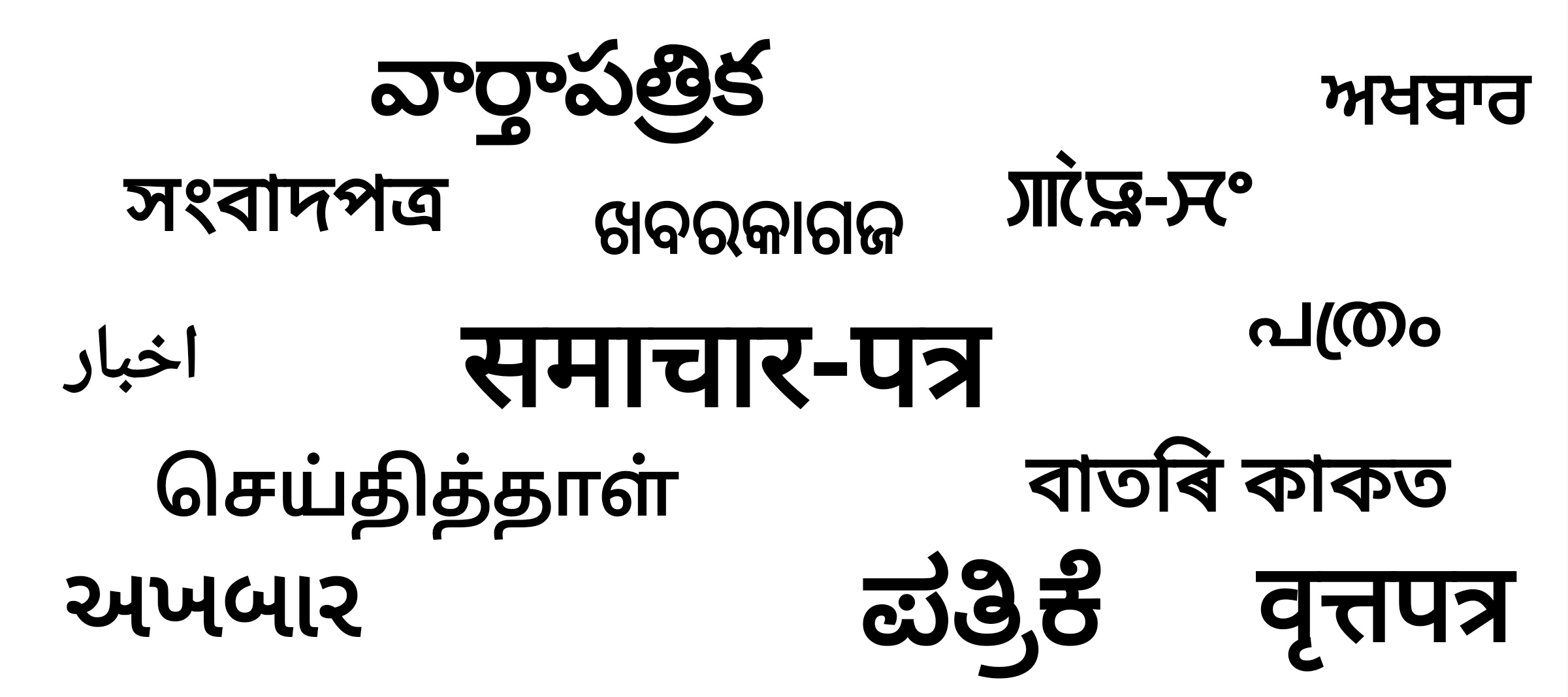

Newspapers of India
Category
Newspapers by languages
- Assamese
- Bengali
- Gujarati
- Hindi
- Kannada
- Malayalam
- Marathi
- Meitei (Manipuri)
- Punjabi
- Tamil
- Telugu
Related
- Newspapers by readership
- Registrar of Newspapers for India
- The Indian Newspaper Society

The Marathi language has a long history of literature and culture. The first Marathi newspaper, Darpan, was started on January 6, 1832, by Balshastri Jambhekar. The paper was bilingual fortnightly also published in English as The Bombay Darpan and stopped publishing in 1840. Founded in 1881 by Bal Gangadhar Tilak, the daily Kesari was a prominent newspaper of the pre-Independence era with a large readership. It claimed to have circulation of 3500 within two years of establishment and reached up to 22,000 during 1908. Narayan Meghaji Lokhande's Marathi daily Din Bandhu, which focused on social causes of labour class, was the second largest circulation in Bombay Presidency with 1650 copies a week in 1884.

== List of newspapers (circulation) ==
- Prabuddha Bharat (1956): Meaning "Enlightened India," this paper symbolized the culmination of Ambedkar's vision for a transformed society.
- Bahujanratna Loknayak
- Dainik Hindusthan
- Dainik Shivner
- Deshdoot
- Ekmat
- Induprakash
- Kesari
- Lokmat
- Loksatta
- Lokshahi
- Mahanagar
- Mahanayak
- Maharashtra Times
- Nava Kaal
- NavaRashtra
- Navshakti
- Prahaar
- Pudhari
- Mahasagar
- Rashtramat
- Samrat
- Saamana
- Saimat
- Sakal
- Tarun Bharat
- Sanchar
- Satya Sahyadry
- Ravivar Loksatta
- Punya Nagari
- Pratahkal
- Shabdmat
- Matrubhumi
- Mahavrutt
- Nagrik Varta
- Yugantar

== List of newspapers (defunct) ==
- Mooknayak (1920–1923): Ambedkar's first newspaper, meaning "Hero of the Voiceless," aimed to give a voice to those who were silenced.
- Bahishkrut Bharat (1927–1929): Translated as "India of the Outcastes," this newspaper focused on the experiences of Dalits and their struggles against discrimination.
- Janata (1930–1956): This paper, meaning "The Masses," continued Ambedkar's advocacy for social justice and equality.
