= Sarup Ram Singh =

Maharao of Sirohi (1920 - 1946)

- Maharajadhiraja; Maharao

Maharao of Sirohi
- Reign: 29 April 1920 – 23 January 1946
- Predecessor: Kesari Singh
- Successor: Tej Ram Singh
- Born: 27 September 1888
- Died: 23 January 1946 (aged 57)
- Spouse: Krishna Kumari of Kutch
- House: Deora Chouhan
- Father: Kesari Singh
- Religion: Hindu

Sarup Ram Singh was the Maharao of Sirohi in India from 1920 until his death in 1946.

== Early life ==
He was born on 27 September 1888 to Kesari Singh and his first wife, Puarji, a daughter of Jalam Singh, the Maharana of Danta.

He received his primary education from Pandit Mansa Ram Shukul. Following this, his father appointed Captain Pritchard, the Assistant to the Resident for the Western Rajputana States, to provide higher education and teach him English. Pritchard taught him for two years. Afterward, J. H. Smith took over and instructed him for eighteen months. Smith instructed him in law, political economy, and various aspects of administration and governance.

In 1910, his father abolished the posts of Diwan and Naib-Diwan and appointed him as Musahib-i-Ala of Sirohi.

On his father's voluntary abdication on 29 April 1920, Sarup succeeded him as the Maharao of Sirohi.

== Personal life ==
He became engaged on 30 June 1900 to a Princess of Pratapgarh at Abu Road. However, the marriage was later called off. On 20 November 1907 he married Krishna Kumari, the daughter of Khengarji III, the Maharao of Kutch. He later married a daughter of the Maharaja of Ratlam, then to the Thakur of Kuwar in Gujarat, and then to the Thakur of Junia in Ajmer. He converted to Islam in the 1940s to marry a Muslim woman. He was advised not to publicly announce his conversion. He followed this advice to prevent protests against him.

He had three daughters. Among them were Jeet Kunverba and Gulab Kunverba. Gulab Kunverba married Digvijaysinhji on 7 March 1935.

He also had a Khanda wife. By her, he had a son named Lakhpat Ram Singh.

== Death ==
He died on 23 January 1946 in Delhi. Upon his death, and in accordance with his will, he was buried according to Islamic rites. This caused significant agitation within his family, his subjects, and Hindu organizations. Since he had no legitimate heir, three claims were put forward before the Government of India for the vacant throne, by Tej Singh,. who belonged to the Mandar branch, by Abhai Singh, who was a grandson of Umed Singh’s brother, and by Lakhpat Ram Singh. Viceroy and Governor-General recognized Tej Singh as the successor. After India’s independence, the other two resubmitted their claims to the Government of India. Ultimately, Abhai Singh was recognized as the legitimate successor.

== Titles, styles and honours ==
=== Titles and styles ===
His Highness Maharajadhiraja Maharao Shri Sarup Ram Singh Bahadur, Maharao of Sirohi.

=== Honours ===
He was appointed Knight Commander of the Order of the Star of India (KCSI) in the 1924 Birthday Honours. In the 1932 New Year Honours, he was appointed Knight Grand Commander of the Order of the Indian Empire.
