= Sardul Singh =

Maharaja of Kishangarh (1879 - 1900)

- Umdai Rajhai Buland Makan

Maharaja of Kishangarh
- Reign: 25 December 1879 – 18 August 1900
- Predecessor: Prithvi Singh
- Successor: Madan Singh
- Born: 10 December 1857
- Died: 18 August 1900 (aged 42)
- Issue: Madan Singh
- House: Kishangarh
- Father: Prithvi Singh

Sir Sardul Singh (Shardul Singh or Sadul Singh) was the Maharaja of Kishangarh from 1879 until his death in 1900.

== Early life and family ==
He was born on 10 December 1857 to Prithvi Singh. He married Jas Kanwar, the daughter of Umaid Singh, the Maharao of Sirohi, in 1870. By her, he had two sons and a daughter. The elder son died at the age of five. The younger son was Madan Singh. The daughter married Jai Singh Prabhakar, the Maharaja of Alwar.

He was a Rajput of the Rathore clan.

== Reign ==
Upon the death of his father, he succeeded to his rank, title, and dignity as the Maharaja of Kishangarh on 25 December 1879. He introduced many valuable reforms in almost every department. He administered his state with considerable success and brought it to a prosperous condition. He introduced a systematic reorganisation of the courts of law and the police. He improved and simplified the systems of accounting and audit, and instituted the court of wards. He organised the forest department and established a more effective central distillery system within the abkari arrangements. He reformed the customs and revenue departments, adopted improved methods for preparing revenue returns, and introduced liberal rules to encourage the expansion of cultivation.

== Death ==
He died on 18 August 1900. He was succeeded by Madan Singh as the Maharaja of Kishangarh.

== Titles, styles, and honours ==
=== Titles and styles ===
His full style was: "His Highness Umdai Rajahai Buland Makan Maharaja Shri Sardul Singh, Maharaja of Kishangarh."

=== Honours ===
He was appointed Knight Grand Commander of the Order of the Indian Empire by the Government of India in 1892.
