= Kesari Singh =

Maharao of Sirohi (1875 - 1920)

- Maharajadhiraja; Maharao

Maharao of Sirohi
- Reign: 16 September 1875 – 29 April 1920
- Predecessor: Umaid Singh II
- Successor: Sarup Ram Singh
- Born: 20 July 1857
- Died: 16 January 1925 (aged 67)
- Father: Umaid Singh II

Sir Kesari Singh was the Maharao of Sirohi from 1875 until his abdication in 1920.

== Birth and education ==
He was born on 20 July 1857 in Poshina to Umaid Singh II. He received his education from Guran Lakhmi Chand, and later from Srimali Pandit Daulat Ram. After Daulat Ram’s death, he was taught by Pandit Ganesha Datta. On the advice of the Political Agent, he subsequently studied English under tutors such as Janki Prasad, Hari Shankar Ojha, and Shankarji Trivedi. He was also trained in the use of weapons.

== Reign ==
Upon the death of his father on 16 September 1875, he succeeded him as the Maharao of Sirohi. He was vested with full administrative powers on 24 November 1875. In 1868, he built the Kesar Bhawan Palace at Mount Abu. On account of his old age, he abdicated on 29 April 1920 in favour of his son, Sarup Ram Singh, but retained his titles and the gun salute.

== Personal life ==
=== Marriages ===
He married four times. His first marriage was in 1875 to Parmarji, a daughter of Jalam Singh, the Maharana of Danta. She died in 1899. His second marriage was in 1884 to Chavdiji, a daughter of Abhai Singh, the Thakore of Varsoda. She died in 1887. His third marriage took place in 1888 to Man Kunwar, a daughter of Narandevji II, the Raja of Dharampur. His fourth marriage was in 1896 to a daughter of Mangal Singh, the Raja of Bhinai.

=== Children ===
By his first marriage, he had a son, Sarup Ram Singh. By his third marriage, he had a son, Man Singh. By his third wife, he had a son, Lakshman Singh, and three daughters: Anand Kanwar, Hait Kanwar, and Padam Kunwar. By his fourth wife, he had a son, Narain Singh.

== Death ==
He died on 16 January 1925 and was succeeded by his son Sarup Ram Singh.

== Titles, styles and honours ==
=== Titles and styles ===
The hereditary title of Maharao was conferred on him by the Victoria in 1899. At the Delhi Durbar of 1911, George V conferred upon him the title of Maharajadhiraja as a hereditary distinction.

=== Honours ===
He was made a Knight Commander of the Order of the Star of India in 1895 and a Knight Grand Commander of the Order of the Indian Empire in 1901. As the ruler of Sirohi, he was entitled to a salute of 15 guns. His salute was later raised to 17 guns as a personal distinction.
