= Kesar Bhawan Palace =

Palace and Hotel in Mount Abu

- Interactive map of the Kesar Bhawan Palace area

General information
- Location: Near Tibetan Market, Sunset Point Road, Machgoan, Mount Abu, India
- Coordinates: 24°35′18.49″N 72°42′28.91″E
- Client: Kesari Singh
- Owner: Daivat Singh

Website
- https://hkbp.in/

Kesar Bhawan Palace, situated at Mount Abu in Sirohi, Rajasthan, is the residence of the royal family of Sirohi that now operates as a heritage hotel. It is the oldest royal property on Mount Abu.

== History ==
In 1311, Lumbha, a progenitor of the royal house of Sirohi, acquired by means of arms the Mount Abu and Chandravati from the Paramaras. In the nineteenth century, Mount Abu was getting quite popular among the Europeans visiting it, so in 1845 the then Maharao of Sirohi gave certain lands on it on lease to the British Government for the establishment of a sanitarium. This was on the condition that no cow should be killed or beef brought up Mount Abu. Sometime after, when it was decided that the agent to the Governor-General in Rajputana would make Mount Abu his headquarters, the then Maharao granted the British Government civil and criminal jurisdiction in certain areas, except in cases in which both parties involved were subjects of the Sirohi. This arrangement lasted until 1917, and following its end, Kesari Singh granted certain lands at Mount Abu in permanent lease to the British Government.

== Description ==
In 1868, Kesari Singh built this palace at Mount Abu to be used as a guest house for his guests visiting the hill station. It houses two duplex suites, 23 bedrooms and a restaurant. The rooms have marble floors and balconies and the palace itself is surrounded by trees. It was renovated by Daivat Singh, a son of Abhai Singh, the last Maharao, following which Daivat converted the property into an eco-friendly heritage hotel.
