= Girijabai Kelkar =

Marathi writer

Girijabai Madhav Kelkar
- Born: 1886
- Died: 1980 (aged 93–94)
- Occupations: Feminist and writer

Girijabai Madhav Kelkar (1886–1980) was a feminist and writer from India. The performance of her play led to many debates about women's rights and the concept of gender roles. She was president of 23rd Akhil Bharatiya Marathi Natya Sammelan (All-India Marathi Theatre Meet) of Akhil Bharatiya Marathi Natya Parishad held in 1928 at Pune.

She was sister-in-law of Narasimha Chintaman Kelkar. She married into a family of illustrious Marathi literary figures. She was encouraged by her husband to pursue Marathi literature as a profession, and thus fulfill her aspirations. She was a prolific writer who promoted Marathi language and literature. She started Bhagini Mandal, a women's organisation in Jalgaon. She was the president of the All India Hindu Mahila Parishad in 1935.

Her works include Purushanche Band [Men's Rebellion] and Striyanche Swarga [Women's Paradise]. Padma Anagol describes her views on women's oppression as complex, which found themselves expressed in her works. According to her, the play Purushanche Banda was written to "counteract the effects of vilification of Indian women" by Khadilkar's play Striyancha Band [Women's Rebellion]. The Encyclopaedia of Indian Literature describes her work as inspired by Apte. Her work describes "women's suffering in the frame work of family life, moderately protesting against social injustice". She strongly identified herself with the traditional Hindu notions of femininity, with a mystified role as spouse and mother, asking for trivial concessions.
