= Rao Surtan Deora =

Rao of Sirohi from 1572 to 1610

- Maharao of Sirohi
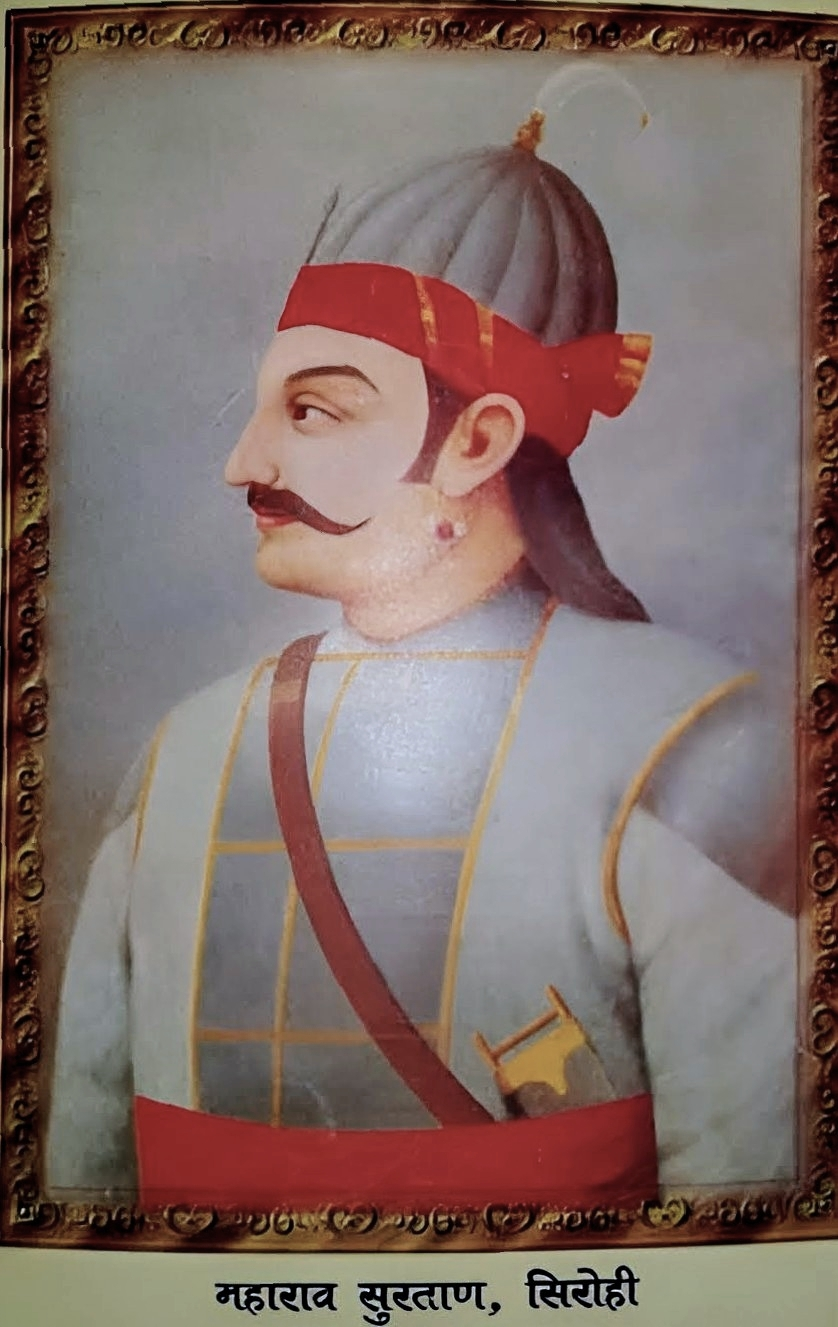

King of Sirohi
- Reign: 1572 – 1610
- Coronation: 1572
- Predecessor: Rao Man Singh II
- Successor: Rao Rai Singh II
- Reign: 1572—73
- Reign: 1574—1610
- Born: 1558
- Died: 1610 (aged 51–52)
- Spouse: among others; Rani Raiyda Kunwar; Rani Bhatiyani Maaya Devi
- Issue: Rai Singh; Sur Singn; Rani Jet Kunwar of Mewar (wife of Jagat Singh)
- Dynasty: Chauhan
- Father: Bhan Singh
- Religion: Hinduism

Rao Surtan Singh Deora (r. 1572–1610) was the Deora Chauhan ruler of the small chieftaincy of Sirohi bordering western Mewar in present-day Rajasthan from the year 1572 until his death he was the adopted son of Rao Man Singh II. He was crowned at the age of 12.Rao Surtan stayed hostile to the ruling foreign powers in India. He was well known for defending Sirohi from the Mughal Empire. He secured his position after an initial succession dispute and spent his reign defending Sirohi’s autonomy, overseeing public works, and maintaining traditional feudal grants.

== Early life and accession ==
Surtan Singh was born in 1558 into the Deora branch of the Chauhan clan to Bhan Singh of Nandia. He was grandson of Randheer Singh a grandson of Rao Lakha of Sirohi. Upon the death of his adoptive father, Man Singh II, in 1572, he was formally adopted and proclaimed heir to the throne of Sirohi. His accession was contested by his chief minister, Bija Singh, leading to an eight-month dispute before Surtan Singh’s position was confirmed.

== Military engagements ==
He fought 52 battles during his reign of Sirohi.

=== Battle of Dattani (1583) ===
In 1583, Surtan Singh led Sirohi forces with help of idar’s army led by Rao Hammir Emaliya at the Battle of Dattani against a Mughal detachment of combined forces led by Jagmal Sisodiya, Rao Rai Singh (third son of Rao Chandrasen) and Koli Singh Datiwara resulting in a victory that affirmed the state’s de facto independence.

Throughout his reign, he mounted further defensive operations against neighbouring Rajput principalities and Mughal allies to protect Sirohi’s borders.

== Administration and public works ==
Surtan Singh commissioned the repair and maintenance of key fortifications at Shivpuri and the ruins of Chandravati, bolstering regional defenses. He also oversaw the restoration of irrigation systems along the Jawai and Chara rivers to support agriculture in arid areas. To uphold the traditional feudal order, he confirmed existing jagir grants to leading thakur and Brahmin families. He further supported archaeological work at Chandravati, where medieval temple structures were consolidated.

== Personal life ==
He had 12 Queens. Surtan Singh married Rai Da Kunwar, daughter of Thakur Ashkaran of Patoli, and later Maya Devi, daughter of Rawal Bhojraj Singh of Jaisalmer. He had two sons His eldest son, Rai Singh II, was appointed heir and succeeded him upon his death and his younger son Sur Singh became prime minister.

== Relations with neighbouring states ==
Rao Surtan Singh provided shelter to Chandrasen during his exile from Marwar by Mughals for two years. His Sirohi provided sanctuary to the Rathore heir Ajit Singh of Marwar during Aurangzeb’s persecution, hiding him in the Kalindri locality of Sirohi to protect the legitimate claim to the Marwar throne. He also had friendly relation with Maharana Pratap of Mewar and Amar Singh.

== Death and legacy ==
Maharao Surtan Singh died in 1610 and was interred according to Rajput rites. His thirty-eight-year reign is credited with preserving Sirohi’s practical autonomy and ensuring internal stability during a period of Mughal expansion.
