= Tej Ram Singh =

Maharao of Sirohi (1946 - 1950)

Tej Ram Singh was the Maharao of Sirohi from 1946 to 1950.

== Biography ==
He was the son of Raj Sahiban Bhopal Singh of the senior sub-branch of the Mandar branch of the royal family of Sirohi. Upon the death of Sarup Ram Singh on 23 January 1946, the throne of Sirohi became vacant, as there was no legitimate heir to succeed him. As a result, three claims were presented before the Governor-General of India. In addition to him, the claimants were Abhai Singh and Lakhpat Ram Singh. After considering all the claims, the Governor-General, in exercise of his discretion and with the approval of the Secretary of State for India, selected him and recognized him as the legitimate successor of the deceased ruler. Accordingly, he was installed on the vacant throne on 1 July 1946. He was a minor at the time, so a council of regency was established on 14 August 1947 to oversee the state's affairs. On 5 August 1947, the British government returned Mount Abu to him.
