= Umaid Singh II =

Maharao of Sirohi (1862 - 1875)

Umaid Singh II (or Umed Singh II) was the Maharao of Sirohi from 1862 until his death in 1875.

== Biography ==
He was born in 1833 to Sheo Singh and his wife, Abhaya Kunwar, daughter of Udai Singh, the Thakur of Thob. When his older brother, Guman Singh, committed suicide, the traumatic incident caused great shock to his father. As a result, his father handed over the administration of the affairs of Sirohi to him in 1861; however, he retained the dignities and honors of the office for himself.

Upon the death of his father on 8 December 1862, he succeeded him as the Maharao of Sirohi. One of the first things he did was reconcile with his brothers. He invited them back to Sirohi, and when Jet Singh, Jawan Singh, and Jamat Singh appeared before him, he granted them fiefs for their maintenance. When his brother Hamir Singh, who had been living as an outlaw, heard of this, he began to consider appearing before him. Upon learning of Hamir's intention, Umaid invited him to Sirohi. When Hamir complied in 1863, Umaid granted him a fief for his maintenance and fixed his seat at Bhimana. He initially administered his state affairs with the assistance of the Political Superintendent for nearly three years. He was invested with full administrative powers by the Government of India on 1 September 1865.

He married once and had a son, Kesari Singh, and a daughter. His wife was from Idar. His daughter married Sardul Singh, the Maharaja of Kishangarh, in 1870.

He died on 16 September 1875 and was succeeded by Kesari Singh.
