= Mohkam =

Mohkam may refer to:

- Mohkam Singh (1663–1705), Sikh saint
- Mohkam Chand (1750–1814), Sikh general
- Mohkam Singh (ruler) (1839 – 1841), Indian ruler
- Al-Muḥkam wa-al-muḥīt al-aʻẓam, a medieval Arabic dictionary
