= Krushnaji Prabhakar Khadilkar =

Indian writer (1872–1948)

Krishnaji Prabhakar Khadilkar
- Born: 25 November 1872; Sangli
- Died: 26 August 1948 (aged 75)
- Citizenship: Indian
- Education: Deccan College
- Writing career
- Notable work: Kichak Vadh

Krishnaji Prabhakar Khadilkar (25 November 1872 – 26 August 1948) was a Marathi writer from Bombay Presidency, British India. George calls him "a prominent lieutenant of Lokmanya Tilak". He was editor of Kesari, Lokmanya and Navakal. The subject of navakal is political, trade and market price Khadilkar in the beginning of his career wrote prose-plays, but achieved "even greater recognition" with plays like Svayamvara – which had songs which were based on Indian classical music. The notability of his dramatic technique, in his fifteen plays, was to "endow ancient Hindu legends and tales with contemporary political significance". The Encyclopaedia of Indian Literature (Volume Two) (Devraj To Jyoti), remarks that while Annasaheb Kirloskar "laid the foundation of popular sangit natak", it saw its great rise and gradual decline with the advent of Khadilkar. It considers Khadilkar along with Bal Gandharva as "the architect of what later on came to be called the golden age of the Marathi drama".

In 1921, after Tilak's death, Lokmanya was founded by admirers of Tilak. Khadilkar assumed its editorship. In 1923 he resigned because of his support of Gandhi's position in division of nationalist political opinion, under opposition from the promoters who rejected it. In March 1923 Khadilkar started his own newspaper Nava Kaal, which "supported Gandhi's programme" and its editorials "preached Gandhi's philosophy.

== Life and career ==
Khadilkar was born on 25 November 1872 in Sangli. At the age of 15, he wrote a novel, and the next year he wrote a play. He received his B.A. degree in 1892 from Deccan College in Pune. Out of his abiding interest in plays, he closely studied during his college years the plays of Sanskrit and English playwrights.

== Association with Tilak ==
In 1897, Khadilkar joined the editorial staff of Bal Gangadhar Tilak's daily Kesari (केसरी). His ideas and literary style so closely matched those of Tilak that the readers of Kesari never knew as to which of the two had written the editorials appearing in the newspaper. In 1908 the colonial government arrested Tilak on charges of sedition for an article written by Khadilkar. Tilak was sentenced to six years transportation to be served in Mandalay.

During 1908–10, Khadilkar served as the chief editor of Tilak's English daily Maratha besides serving on the editorial board of Kesari. In 1910, he left the editorship of both Kesari and Maratha, but returned to work as the editor of Keasari during 1917–20.

=== Plotted Nepalese invasion of India ===
Khadilkar was a part of plot that envisioned the invasion of India by the only indedendent Hindu King of a part of India: The king of Nepal. This invasion was to spark an uprising within the country in his support, so that India would be one sovereign Hindu state under the King of Nepal. Tilak's trusted lieutenants Vasukaka Joshi and Khadilkar, entered Nepal, "where they set up a tile factory, as a respectale front for an arms and munitions plant designed to supply to the invading Nepalese army." A Maharashtrian school teacher Mataji, introduced the two to the King of Nepal. They received a contract to retile the palace roof. They were joined by Hanmantrao Kulkarni of Jabalpur and Ketkar from Gwalior. The King of Nepal was influenced to send Nepalese students to Japan for technical training. Joshi went to Japan and the United States. The German arms manufacturing machinery never arrived. The plot never "even approached fruition".

== Later career ==
After Tilak's death in 1920, Khadilkar worked as the editor of daily Lokamanya (लोकमान्य) during 1921–23. In 1923, he founded daily Nava Kal (नवा काळ), which supported Gandhi. In 1929, British authorities imprisoned Khadilkar for a year for the crime of disloyalty to the colonial government. His grandson, Neelkanth Khadilkar (1934-2019) later served as editor of Nava Kal, and was known for his front page editorials. In 1920s, more than hundred years after it was founded, the newspaper is run by Neelkanth's three daughters - Vasanti Unni, Jayashri, and Rohini Khadilkar, who were known as chess prodigies around 1980.

Khadilkar presided over Marathi Sahitya Sammelan at Nagpur in 1933.

He died on 26 August 1948.

== Kichak Vadh ==
Kichak Vadh (The Slaying of Kichak) (1907) is a play based on an episode in the Mahabharat, Kichak is a minister at the court of Virat who attempts to molest Draupadi, he is assassinated by her husband Bhima as a result. The play was a manifestation of resistance to British rule. This molestation is used as a metaphor for the policies of the British colonial government in India. Kichak represented Lord Curzon: Viceroy to the King, just as Kichak was minister to King Virat; Draupadi represented India and Bhima represented an extremist nationalist, in contrast to Yudhishtar, standing for moderate nationalism. The Encyclopaedia of Indian Literature... states that "Kichaka was cast in the mould of the then Viceroy, Lord Curzon, and some of his aggressively arrogant utterances (like, 'the rulers are rulers and the slaves are slaves') found direct echoes in the words of Kichaka, while the popular mood of resentment and revolt was vehemently expressed by the fiery speeches of Draupadi and Bhima" Bhatia considers that the playwright contrasts the aggression and hatred of the government for its colonial subjects with the resistance of those who attempt rescue the nation from colonial evils. Themes of sacrifice, war and duty "sharpened the quest of freedom". The play was an allegorical attack on the colonial government. Nagendra considers the play as a notable example of the use of a mythological character as a symbol of oppression.

=== Audience reaction to Kichak Vadh ===
Ignatius Valentine Chirol's 1910 book Indian Unrest describes the play's plot and explains the allegories. According to Chirol, the play provides a response to John Morley, 1st Viscount Morley of Blackburn, who ridiculed the boast of radical nationalists that they could free their country and defend it from invaders. Chirol suggests that any Englishman who saw the play would remember vividly the tense scowling face of the men as they watch the outrages of Kichak and tearful eyes of the ladies as they watch "Draupadi's entreaties", "their scorn for Yudhishthira's tameness, their admiration of Bhima's passionate protests, and the deep hum of satisfaction which approves the slaughter of the tyrant."

=== Ban ===
The Press Act in India was requested for sanction by the Government of India, in response to the sudden rise in revolutionary activities in 1909. Morley refused in deference to hostile reactions from the English public and "'Friends of India' members of the Parliament." Kincaid was asked to write on the "seditious climate fostered by the native papers". Kincaid wrote four articles in the Times, amongst them was "A seditious play of the Deccan', a critique of the Marathi play Kichak Vadh by K. P. Khadilkar" as an example of sedition. These articles written on 18 January 1910, not only hastened the passage of the India Press Act of 1910 but also called for Kichak Vadh to be banned. The articles were reproduced by The Times of India and Bombay Gazette on 5 and 7 February 1910 respectively. The play was finally banned.

The Encyclopaedia of Indian Literature: K to Navalram mentions that "the London Times, in an eloquent outburst against this play, said in effect, Khadilkar is a most dangerous extremist, and Kichak Vadha is a cleverly veiled incitement to murder the European officials."

== Plays ==
The following is the list of Khadilkar's plays:

1. Savai Madhavrao Yancha Mrutyu (सवाई माधवराव यांचा मृत्यु)(1895–96)
2. Bhaubandaki (भाऊबंदकी) (1909): Described as his last political play.
3. Kanchangadachi Mohana (कांचनगडची मोहना)
4. Manapman (मानापमान) (1911)
5. Swayamvar (स्वयंवर) (1916)
6. Keechak-Wadh (कीचकवध) (1906)
7. Menaka (मेनका)
8. Widyaharan (विद्याहरण) (1913)
9. Sawitri (सावित्री)
10. Draupadi (दौपदी) (1920)
11. Sawati Matsar (सवतीमत्सर)
12. Satwa Pariksha (सत्त्वपरीक्षा))
13. Bayakanche Banda (बायकांचे बंड)
14. Tridandi Sanyas (त्रिदंडी संन्यास)
15. Prem

Sarkar considers Khadilkar a versatile genius who created "several types of womanhood in some of his dramas in verse." Vidyaharan (Stealing of learning) "will be found to be more complex in treatment of the relations between the sexes than is Rabindranath Tagore's Chitra. ... Rukmini-swayamvara (The Choosing of her husband by Rukmini) and Draupadi, Marathas can see the female sex in its atmosphere of freedom, individualism." He notes that Kirloskar was "a genuine poet in whose songs the people find the flow of the soul which as a rule is not characteristic of Khadilkar's compositions" According to Padma Anagol, Girijabai Kelkar wrote Purushanche Band to counteract the "effects of vilification of Indian women in Khadilkar's Striyancha Band".

=== Revised Sangeet Maanapmaan ===
A revised version of Sangeet Maanapmaan played in Maharashtra in 2011–2012, the centenary year of the play's first performance. It has been revised by Rahul Deshpande. "Originally, the play has five parts with around 52 classical songs. Deshpande's version will have two parts and 22 classical songs."
