= Kalyan Singh (ruler) =

Maharaja of Kishangarh (1798 - 1839)

- Umdai Rajhai Buland Makan; Maharajadhiraj
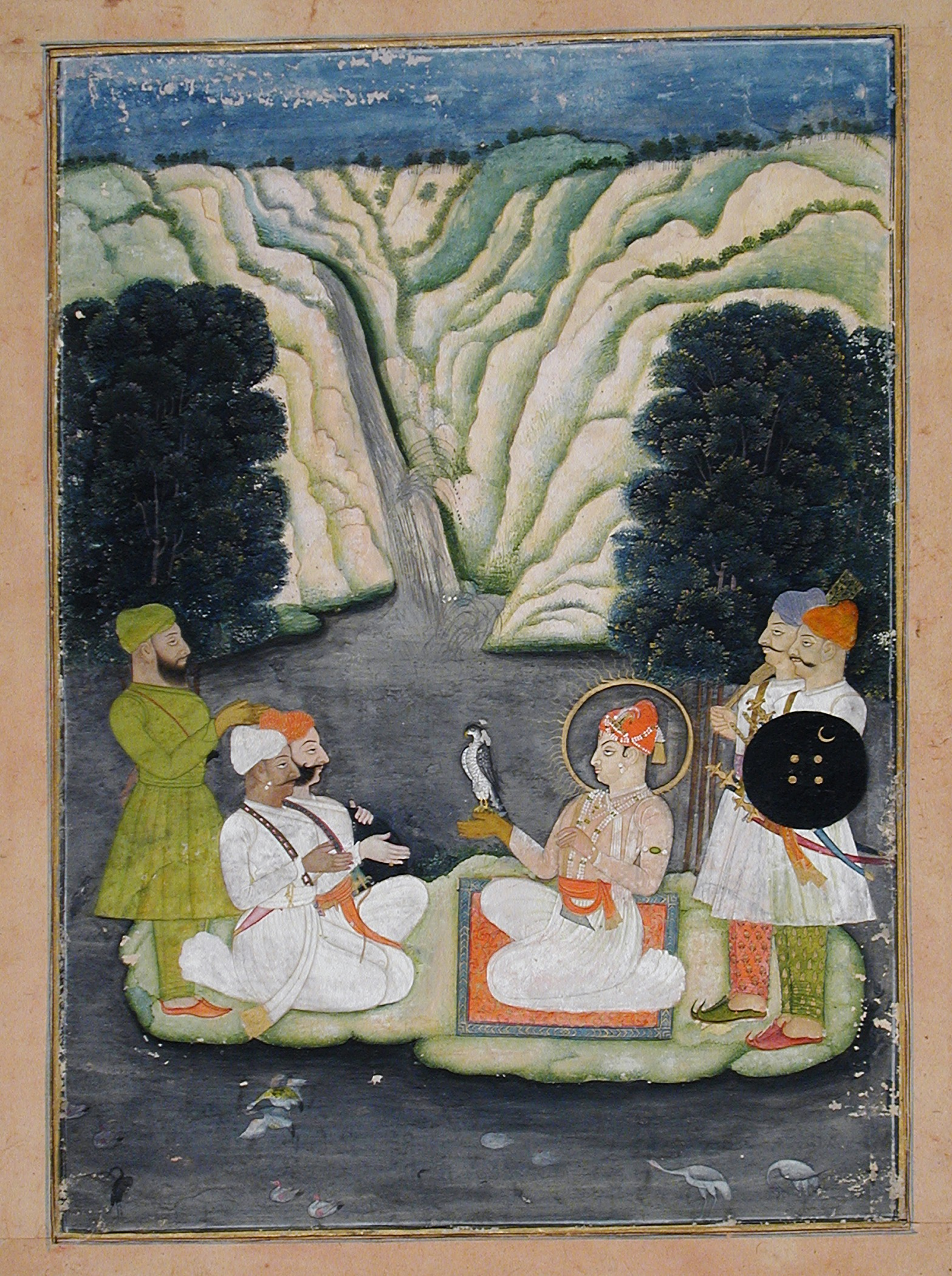
- Kalyan Singh is depicted seated on an orange carpet with a falcon perched on his gloved right hand. He is engaged in conversation with two nobles.

Maharaja of Kishangarh
- Reign: c. 1798 – c. 1839
- Predecessor: Pratap Singh
- Successor: Mohkam Singh
- Born: c. 1794
- Died: c. 1841
- House: Kishangarh

Kalyan Singh was the Maharaja of Kishangarh from 1798 until his death in 1839.

== Biography ==
He was born in 1794 to Pratap Singh. He succeeded his father as the Maharaja of Kishangarh in 1798. He was a minor at the time. During his reign, the Kishangarh School of painting continued to flourish. In 1817, he signed a treaty with the East India Company and acknowledged their supremacy. He pursued a policy in contravention of the agreed terms, and that resulted in the loss of support from both his courtiers and subjects. He informed his nobles that he was prepared to relinquish his royal rights and privileges over them, and to absolve them from the obligation of personal service imposed under the old feudal laws, provided they agreed to compensate him financially in return. His behaviour led to a feud with his nobles. He appealed to Akbar II for assistance and proceeded to Delhi to assume command of the detachment ordered to march in his support. After arriving in Delhi, he focused more on preserving his dignity than on securing the promised assistance. After considerable effort, he was finally granted an audience with the Emperor. Akbar Shah II granted him privilege to wear stockings in his presence. While he was away, the nobles in his favour assembled troops from Bundi and other neighbouring states. Skirmishes took place between these forces and the defiant chiefs, resulting in bloodshed on both sides. East India Company held him responsible for the conflict and summoned him to Kishangarh immediately. He proceeded to Kishangarh at once with the troops he was able to gather in Delhi. His supporters abandoned his cause, and his troops began to disperse. When this became known to his defiant chiefs, they assembled a large army and marched towards Kishangarh, laying siege to it. Their intention was to depose him and place his son, Mohkam Singh, on the throne. Seeing this, he fled to Ajmer and requested the East India Company to take Kishangarh on lease. However, the Company declined his offer. He took residence at Ajmer, while at Kishangarh the nobles proclaimed his son Maharaja and were on the verge of capturing the capital. The political agent then intervened between the two parties and facilitated a settlement. This settlement, however, did not last long, and he in 1832 abdicated in favour of Mohkam Singh, while retaining his titles.

He died in 1839 and was succeeded by his son Mohkam Singh.
