= Prakash Pohare =

Indian editor

Prakash Gopalrao Pohare (born 17 March 1954 in Akola) is the editor-in-chief of popular Marathi language daily newspaper Deshonnati. He lives in Akola, where the headquarters for Deshonnati are located.

Prakash Pohare is also a social activist, who is trying to gain welfare for farmers in Vidarbha. He has served as general secretary of the Cotton Growers Association of Maharashtra, which is active in the Vidarbha area.

== Books published ==
- Prahar part I – May 2003, 14500 copies sold
- Prahar part II – May 2007, 12300 copies sold
- Prahar part III – Dec 2008, 10200 copies sold
- Prahar part VI – 17 March 2010, 10000 copies, 1st edition
- From Latin America 2000 copies, 1st edition
- Navi Disha (Marathi), more than 30000 copies sold
- Navi Disha (Hindi), more than 8000 copies sold of the 1st edition
- Article collection, Sanjivani, 1500 copies 1st Edition
- Developed Vidarbha, Not a separate Vidarbha. 20000 copies sold of 1st edition.

In the pipeline: 10 books of collection of selected editorials from Daily Deshonnati from 1994 to 2010.

== Awards received ==
- Maharashtra Journalist Foundation Organisation, Pune.
- ‘Samaj Spandan’ by Yuvakranti.
- ‘Chetana Puraskar’ by Vidarbha Hindi Sahitya Sangh.
- ‘Sanman Puraskar’ by Navoday Cultural and Social Committee, Nagpur.
- ‘Balshastri Jambhekar Darpan Puraskar’, which is an honour in Maharashtra.
- ‘Gandhi Patrakarita Puraskar’, in memory of late Shri Manoharbabu and late Shri Vinodbabu Bang.
- Awarded for long-term services in the field of media (September 2000).
- ‘Samaj Bhushan Puraskar’, by the hands of Hon’le Shri Sharad Pawar in Mumbai on 24 December 2000.
- ‘Patrakarita Puraskar’ by Arvinbabu Deshmukh Trust in 2000–2001.
- National Award for excellence in printing (March 2002, Chennai)
- Awarded by world congress, in appreciation of his valuable contribution for creating awareness regarding HIV and AIDS
- “Pillar of Hindustani Society” award by the Trans Asian Chamber, Mumbai.
- ‘Vidarbha Bhushan Puraskar’ (9 February 2003)
- The prestigious ‘Acharya Atre Patrakarita Puraskar’, Saswad (13 August 2004)
- The prestigious ‘Probodhankar Thakre Memorial Puraskar’ in 2005.
- ‘National Level Entrepreneurship Excellence Award’ on 6 February 2006 by Jagatik Marathi Chamber of commerce and industries. Mumbai.
- ‘Dr. B.R. Ambedkar Award’ in 2007, by the Buddha Dhamma 2550 Year Celebration Committee.
- ‘O.B.C. Parivartan Puraskar’ in 2007.
- ‘Sanman Puraskar’, by Marathi Bhashi Samanvay Parishad, Madhaya Pradesh by the hands of the Chief Minister of Madhaya Pradesh Honourable Shri Shivraj Singh Chavhan on 30 October 2007.
- ‘Krishi Puraskar’ by Yeshwantrao Chavhan Organisation in 2007.
- ‘Vishva Bhushan Puraskar’ by Marathi Seva Sangh in 2008.
- Award by ‘Padma Gandha Pratisthan’ in February 2008.
- ‘Navratan Gandhi Award’ on 2 October 2008 in Delhi by Navdhanya, an NGO headed by Smt. Vandana Shiva.
- ‘Krishi Patrakarita Puraskar’ by Vasantrao Naik Organisation in 2008.
- ‘Sanman Puraskar’ by Maharashtra Orange Growers Federation in 2008.
- ‘Udim Puraskar’ by Pratibha Sahitya Sangh in 2008.
- Delivered over 400 lecturers in various parts of the country on various subjects.
