= Nava Kaal =

Indian newspaper

- Type: Daily
- Format: Broadsheet
- Publisher: Nilkanth Khadilkar
- Founded: 1923
- Political alignment: Pro-Congress
- Language: Marathi
- City: Mumbai
- Country: India
- Website: www.navakal.org
- Free online archives: enavakal.com

Navakal (Devnagari नवा काळ) is a Marathi daily newspaper. It is based in Mumbai, the capital of the Indian state of Maharashtra. Its owner editor is Nilkanth Khadilkar. Robin Jeffery has called Khadilkar one of the most remarkable and self-reliant owners of small newspapers. In the context of pre-independence Mumbai, it has been described as a Congress paper, contemporarily it has been considered to be aligned with the Shiv Sena. In 1999 Nava Kaal had a circulation share of 8% and a readership share of 27% for all of Maharashtra, in the 1950s Nava Kaal's circulation under Nilkanth Khadilkar's father had fallen to 800 and the paper was nearly closed.

== History ==
In 1921, after Tilak's death, Lokmanya was founded by his admirers. Krushnaji Prabhakar Khadilkar assumed its editorship. In 1923 he resigned because of his support of Gandhi's position in division of nationalist political opinion, under opposition from the promoters who rejected it. In March 1923 Khadilkar started his own newspaper Navakal, which "supported Gandhi's programme" and its editorials "preached Gandhi's philosophy.

== See also ==
- List of Marathi-language newspapers
- List of newspapers in India
