= Vasukaka Joshi =

Indian freedom fighter (1856–1944)

Vasudev Ganesh Joshi
- Born: 28 April 1856; Dhom, near Wai, Bombay Presidency
- Died: 12 January 1944 (aged 87)
- Other names: Vasukaka Ganesh Joshi, Vasudeo Ganesh Joshi
- Known for: Indian Freedom Struggle

Vasudev Ganesh Joshi ( 28 April 1856 – 12 January 1944), popularly known as Vasukaka Joshi, was an Indian Freedom Fighter.

Joshi was the owner of Chitrashala press after Vishnushastri Krushnashastri Chiplunkar.

During the freedom struggle of India, Joshi with Krushnaji Prabhakar Khadilkar were close associates of Lokmanya Tilak and tried to establish contact with Japan via Nepal government. Joshi was also a member of Indian Home Rule League's delegation to England.

== Life ==
Vasudeo Ganesh Joshi was born in a middle-class Deshastha Brahmin family on 28 April 1856 at Dhom near Wai in Satara district. His father Ganukaka Joshi was a priest, farmer, trader and moneylender. The family originally hails from Aurangabad. Vasukaka had three brothers and three sisters.
