= Prithwi Singh =

Maharaja of Kishangarh (1841 - 1879)

Prithvi Singh

Maharaja of Kishangarh
- Reign: c. 1841 – c. 1879
- Predecessor: Mohkam Singh
- Successor: Maharaja Sadul Singh
- Born: Kunwar Surtan Singh; 14 May 1838; Kacholia, Kishangarh
- Died: 25 December 1879 (aged 41); Kishangarh Fort, Kishangarh
- Spouse: Maharaniji Sa Sisodiniji of Shahpura State
- Issue: Sadul Singh
- House: Kishangarh
- Father: Rajvi Bhim Singh of Kacholia

Umda-e-Raja-e-Buland Makam Shri Maharaja Sir Prithvi Singh was the Rathore-Rajput ruler of its Kishan-Singhot Jodha sub-clan of Kishangarh State from the year 1841 until his untimely death in 1879.

== Birth ==
He was born to Bhim Singh. His father was the third son of Bagh Singh of Fatehgarh, who was the jagirdar of Kacholia. He was a Rajput of the Rathore clan.

== Reign ==
When Mohkam Singh died in 1841 without leaving any issue of the body or an adopted heir, the throne of Kishangarh became vacant. That same year, Mohkam's widow formally adopted Prithwi as her son, and he succeeded Mohkam on the throne of Kishangarh. Throughout his reign, he conducted the administration of his state with competence and success. He laid the foundation upon which administrative reforms were later introduced in Kishangarh.

== Death ==
He died in 1879 and was succeeded by his son, Sadul Singh, as the Maharaja of Kishangarh.

== Titles and styles ==
His full style was: "His Highness Umdai Rajahai Buland Makan Maharaja Shri Prithwi Singh, Maharaja of Kishangarh."
