= Bahujanratna Loknayak =

Marathi-language newspaper

Bahujanratna Loknayak (newspaper)
- Type: Daily Newspaper
- Format: Broadsheet
- Owner: Shubham Kundan Gote
- Founder: Kundan Gote
- Editor-in-chief: Shubham Kundan Gote
- Managing editor: Buddhabhushan Kundan Gote
- Founded: October 23, 2005; 20 years ago
- Language: Marathi
- Headquarters: Thane, Maharashtra
- City: Thane
- Country: India
- Website: bloknayak.com

Bahujanratna Loknayak is a Marathi daily broadsheet newspaper based in Thane, Maharashtra. It was founded by Kundan Gote on 23 October 2005 and is owned by his older son Shubham Kundan Gote, who is editor-in-chief. The paper has eight editions from locations in Maharashtra, Thane, Mumbai, Nashik, Aurangabad, Pune, Raigad, Jalna and Akola.

== See also ==
- List of Marathi-language newspapers
