= Ravivar Loksatta =

Marathi weekly newspaper

- Type: Weekly newspaper
- Owner: Indian Express Limited
- Publisher: Indian Express Limited
- Language: Marathi
- Headquarters: Mumbai, Maharashtra, India
- City: Mumbai, Nagpur, Pune, Ahmedabad
- Country: India

Ravivar Loksatta is a Marathi weekly newspaper published in India which is one of the highest circulated weekly newspapers in India. It is published by Indian Express Limited in Mumbai, Nagpur, Pune and Ahmedabad. It is registered in Registrar of Newspapers for India.

== Circulation ==
- 2012 - 363,006
- 2013 - 364,723
- 2016 - 401,862
- 2017 - 399,928
- 2018 - 364,033
- 2019 - 353,522
