= Deshdoot =

Indian newspaper

- Type: Daily Newspaper
- Format: Broadsheet
- Owner: The Deshdoot Group of Newspapers
- Founder: Deokisan Sarda
- Publisher: The Deshdoot Group of Newspapers
- Language: Marathi, English
- Headquarters: Nashik
- City: Nashik, Ahmednagar, Dhule, Jalgaon, Nandurbar
- Country: India
- Sister newspapers: Sarvmat, Nagar Times
- Website: www.deshdoot.com

Deshdoot (Marathi देशदूत – messenger of the country) is an Indian daily newspaper, published in the Marathi language in the northern part of Maharashtra state. It is headquartered in Nashik.

Deshdoot is the fastest growing Marathi newspaper in India.

== History ==
It was founded in 1966 by Mr. Deokisan Sarda. His younger son Mr. Vikram Sarda is currently the Managing director.

Deshdoot was a weekly newspaper until September 1970. Today, it is in Alexa's top 15 ranked web-site in Marathi category.

It is an established daily in North Maharashtra, comprising the five districts of Nashik, Jalgaon, Dhule, Nandurbar and Ahmednagar. The paper was established in 1966 with its flagship edition in Nashik. Since then, the paper has grown steadily across North Maharashtra starting with the English daily Deshdoot (called Deshdoot Times since 1998) in 1991; the Dhule edition in 1996; the Jalgaon edition in 1997; the Nandurbar edition in 1998 and the Ahmednagar edition in 1999.

The group also launched a different newspaper by the name of Sarvamat in Ahmednagar in 1976. It is among the few publications that has two newspapers in the same language for the same market.
