= Dnyanesh Maharao =

Indian writer and editor

- Born: Dnyanesh Ramkrishna Maharao; 11 June 1960 (age 65); Mumbai, Maharashtra, India
- Occupations: Journalist, Editor
- Years active: 1985–present
- Title: Editor Chitralekha Marathi Weekly Magazine

Dnyanesh Maharao is a writer and editor of renowned Marathi weekly magazine Chitralekha. He is in active journalist since 1 June 1989. Earlier he was Assistant Editor of Marathi weekly magazine Vivek, from 1 April 1985 to 31 May 1989. He has written more than 20 books in Marathi as well as in English. He has written a famous book: Thackeray : life & style.

He has also written two plays in Marathi: Jinku ya Dahi Disha and Sangeet Ghanlin Lotangan.

On the occasion of the 125th birth anniversary of Bal Gandharva and 130th anniversary of Sangeet Saubhadra, as a tribute to Annasaheb Kirloskar and Bal Gandharva, he has recreated Sangeet Saubhadra under the banner of Om Natyagandha Mumbai and presented it to the current generation to have a test of the old musical drama. He himself has played the role of Narad in this play.

He was a Festival Director for the 4th Annual "Maharashtra State Level Egalitarian Literature Festival" (समतावादी साहित्य संमेलन) which was held from 26 to 28 November 2011 at Latur Maharashtra.

== Personal life ==
Dnyanesh Maharao was born on 11 June 1960 in Mumbai.

== Awards ==
Sr.No.	Year	Name of the Award	Award by Organisation
1	2003	Krushiwalkar Prabhakar Patil Award – 2003	Akhil Bharatiya Marathi Patrakar Parishad
2	2005	Madhavrao Bagal Award – 2005	Rajarshi Chhatrapati Shahu Memorial Trust & Bhai Madhavrao Bagal University Kolhapur
3	2008	Shivnerkar Vishwanathrao Wable Journalism Award – 2008	Dainik Shivner
4	2009	V. V. Shirwadkar Best Marathi Literature – Drama – Jinku Ya Dahi Disha	Government of Maharashtra.
5	2009	Aacharya Aatre Smruti Puraskar 2009	Mumbai Marathi Patrakar Sangh (मुंबई मराठी पत्रकार संघ)
6	2010	Nanasaheb Vairale Smruti Puraskar	Maharashtra Editor Council
7	2011	Chintamanrao Deshmukh Journalism Award – 2011 (चिंतामणराव देशमुख पत्रकारिता पुरस्कार २०११)	Roha Patrakar Sangh (रोहा पत्रकार संघ)
8	2012	Aatre Pratishthan Award for Journalism	Aacharya Aatre Vikas Pratishthan Saswad
9	2012	Vidyadhar Gokhale Lalitlekhan Puraskar – 2012	Mumbai Marathi Patrakar Sangh
10	2013	Dinmitra Mukundrao Patil Patrakarita Puraskar 2013	Dinmitra

== Plays, dramas, theater ==
Sr.No.	Year	Name of Play	Language	Role	Remarks
1	Aug 2006	Jinku Ya Dahi Disha	Marathi	Shahir, Chitrawala	Musical
2	Dec 2009	Sangeet Ghalin Lotangan	Marathi	Chilte Maharaj	Musical
3	Aug 2012	Sangeet Saubhadra	Marathi	Narad	Musical

== Bibliography ==
Sr.No.	Name of Book	Language	Publication	First Edition
1	Dev Dharma Sanskriti Bhaktichya Navane Pa. Punchya Leela	Marathi	Saket Prakashan Mumbai	Sept 1998
2	Uttarkriya	Marathi	Pushpa Prakashan Mumbai	Jan 2000
3	Phakta Rashtrabhaktan Sathi	Marathi	Pushpa Prakashan Mumbai	Nov 2000
4	Assal Marathyansathi	Marathi		Nov 2000
5	Uthava Maharashtra Desh	Marathi		Nov 2000
6	Ujalavi Dnyanachi Diwali	Marathi	Pushpa Prakashan Mumbai	Nov 2000
7	Ase Ghadale	Marathi	Pushpa Prakashan Mumbai	Jan 1996
8	Hindu – Hindutva – Hindustani	Marathi		Nov 2000
9	Samajik aani Rajakiya Badalansathi Lokshakti	Marathi		Nov 2000
10	Bhuta Peksha Bhat Bhari	Marathi		2005
11	Dharmancha Vichar, Vicharancha Dharm	Marathi	Lokshakti Prakashan Mumbai	Nov 2002
12	Dharile Pandhariche Chor (धरिले पंढरीचे चोर)	Marathi		Nov 2000
13	Bahujananche Dev aani Tyanche Dushman (बहुजनांचे देव आणि त्यांचे दुश्मन)	Marathi		Nov 2000
14	Thackeray: Life and Style (ठाकरे फमिली : लाईफ आणि स्टाईल)	English		Aug 1995
15	Prabondhankaranche Jwalant Hindutva (प्रबोधनकारांचे ज्वलंत हिंदुत्व)	Marathi	Pushpa Prakashan Mumbai	Nov 2000
16	Garje Shivarayanchi Talwar (गर्जे शिवरायांची तलवार)	Marathi	Darpan Prakashan Mumbai	Mar 2004
17	Lokshahichi Chinta aani Chintan (लोकशक्तीची चिंता आणि चिंतन)	Marathi		
