= Yagya Narayan Singh =

Maharaja of Kishangarh (1926 - 1939)

- Umdai Rajhai Buland Makan

Maharaja of Kishangarh
- Reign: 16 November 1926 – 3 February 1939
- Coronation: 24 November 1926
- Predecessor: Madan Singh
- Successor: Sumer Singh
- Born: 26 January 1896
- Died: 3 February 1939 (aged 43)
- Spouse: Bhanwar Kumari (m. 1915); Pratap Kumari (m. 1931)
- Issue: Yatendra Singh; Kalyan Kanwar; Govardhan Kanwar
- House: Kishangarh
- Father: Dixit Jawan Singh (biological); Madan Singh (adoptive)
- Mother: Shekhawatji (biological)
- Education: Mayo College

Yagya Narayan Singh was the Maharaja of Kishangarh from 1926 until his death in 1939.

== Early life, family, and education ==
He was born on 26 January 1896 to Dixit Jawan Singh and his wife Shekhawatji, the daughter of Anand Singh, Thakur of Mandawa. His father had performed a somayajna, and he was born nine months after the final oblation of that yajna. Upon the death of his father in September 1903, he succeeded him as Maharaj of Karkeri. He was educated at Mayo College, Ajmer, where he passed the Diploma Examination, standing second in order of merit. During his time there, he also served as the troop leader of the Mounted Squadron. He accompanied his first cousin, Madan Singh, to attend the Delhi Durbar of 1911.

In 1915, he married Bhanwar Kumari, a daughter of the Raja of Madhusudangarh. In 1933, he married Pratap Kumari, a daughter of the Raja of Madhusudangarh and the niece of his first wife. He had three sons, including Yatendra Singh by his first wife, but all of them died in childhood. He also had two daughters, named Kalyan Kanwar and Govardhan Kanwar.

He was a Rajput of the Rathore clan.

== Reign ==
As Madan Singh had no male issue to succeed him, he adopted Yagya Narayan Singh and declared him heir-apparent to the throne of Kishangarh. However, when Madan Singh died on 25 September 1926, Yagya Narayan Singh's succession was postponed due to the possibility of a posthumous heir being born to Madan Singh. On medical advice, the Governor-General of India approved his succession on 16 November 1926. Nonetheless, it was not until 24 November 1926 that the Resident at Jaipur, in a special durbar held at Kishangarh, formally announced his succession.

== Personal interests ==
He was a Hindu of the Vallabhkul sect of Vaishnavism. He was a skilled polo player, poet, and singer.

== Death ==
He died on 3 February 1939. According to his wishes, he was cremated at the site where his father had performed the somayajna. No meal was served on the twelfth day following his death, as he had also requested. He left no male issue to succeed him but instructed that Sumer Singh of Zorawarpura be adopted and succeed him. Accordingly, Sumer was adopted and succeeded him as the Maharaja of Kishangarh.

== Titles and styles ==
His full style was: "His Highness Umdai Rajahai Buland Makan Maharaja Shri Yagya Narayan Singh, Maharaja of Kishangarh."
