= Sumer Singh (ruler) =

Maharaja of Kishangarh (1939 - 1971)

- Umdai Rajahai Buland Makan

Maharaja of Kishangarh
- Reign: 24 April 1939 – 16 February 1971
- Predecessor: Yagya Narayan Singh
- Successor: Brijraj Singh
- Born: 27 January 1929
- Died: 16 January 1971 (aged 41)
- Spouse: Gita Kumari (m. 1948)
- Issue: Shree Kanwar; Nandini Kanwar; Brijraj Singh; Prithiviraj Singh
- House: Kishangarh

Sumer Singh was the Maharaja of Kishangarh from 1939 until his death in 1971.

== Early life, family, and education ==
He was born on 27 January 1929 to Budh Singh of Zorawarpura. He was educated at Mayo College, Ajmer. He was a Rajput of the Rathore clan.

He married on 30 January 1948, to Gita Kumari, daughter of Bahadursinhji Mansinhji, the Thakore of Palitana. They had four children: two daughters, Shree Kanwar and Nandini Kanwar, and two sons, Brijraj Singh and Prithiviraj Singh.

== Reign ==
When Yagya Narayan Singh died on 3 February 1939 without leaving a male heir, his widow, in accordance with her late husband's wishes, adopted Sumer as son and heir. His turban ceremony was duly performed. His adoption and succession were approved by the Governor-General of India and announced by of C.L. Cornfield, the resident at Jaipur during a durbar held at Kishangarh on 24 April 1939. As he was a minor at the time, the administration of the state was placed under the supervision of a council consisting of four members. This council was to act under the advice of the resident at Jaipur. When he came of age, he was invested with full ruling powers on 5 June 1947. To commemorate the occasion, he instituted a medal. Some time afterwards, he signed the instrument of accession, by which his state acceded to the Dominion of India. He established a State Assembly and conducted elections. The Government of India later concluded that Kishangarh was a small state and decided to merge it into Ajmer-Merwara. He was summoned to Delhi to sign the merger agreement, which he did on 26 September 1947.

== Death ==
On 16 February 1971, he drove out of his palace in the evening in his Fiat car, which bore the registration number Kishangarh No. 11. While he was travelling on the Kishangarh–Ajmer road, a person seated in his car fired a shot and killed him approximately 4 kilometres after Madan Ganj. He was succeeded by Brijraj Singh.

== Titles and styles ==
His full style was: "His Highness Umdai Rajahai Buland Makan Maharaja Shri Sumer Singh, Maharaja of Kishangarh."
