= The Bombay Durpun =

Indian bi-lingual newspaper

- Type: Weekly newspaper
- Founder: Balshastri Jambhekar
- Editor: Balshastri Jambhekar
- Founded: 6 January 1832; 194 years ago
- Ceased publication: 25 June 1840; 185 years ago
- Language: Marathi; English
- Headquarters: Bombay
- City: Bombay
- Country: British India

The Bombay Durpun, commonly known as Bombay Durpun, Durpun or Darpan, was a bilingual language newspaper published in Bombay from 1832 to 1840. It was founded by Balshastri Jambhekar, a social reformer regarded as the Father of Marathi journalism. It was the first Marathi newspaper and the first issue was published on January 6, 1832. The founding date of the Bombay Durpun, January 6, is celebrated as Marathi Journalist Day in Maharashtra to commemorate that day.

== History ==
It was established in January 1832. Initially, the newspaper was published fortnightly, but later it was made weekly. At that time, this issue was published in both Marathi and English. The newspaper used to have two columns, one in English and one in Marathi. The column used to be written and printed in Marathi so that the Marathi people could understand what was happening in the country. So that the British could understand what was written in the newspaper, the second column was written in English. Despite the constant attention of the British power, the newspaper Darpan ran for eight and a half years. Its last issue was published in July 1840.

As the concept of a newspaper was not rooted in the common people then, Darpan did not get a large number of subscribers initially.

The Bombay Durpun was published for eight years in educating and enlightening the public, at the end, the newspaper was converted into the United Service Gazette and Literary Chronicle. While announcing the change, the proprietors thanked their supporters and said with pride that the Durpun had not lost a single friend during its career. However, later Jambhekar launched Dig Durshun, a monthly Marathi magazine.

The copies of The Bombay Durpun have been preserved by the Maharashtra State Archives (archival agency of the Government of Maharashtra) in Mumbai.

== See also ==
- List of Marathi-language newspapers
- Media of India
- History of journalism
