= Madan Singh (ruler) =

Maharaja of Kishangarh (1900–1926)

- Umdai Rajhai Buland Makan
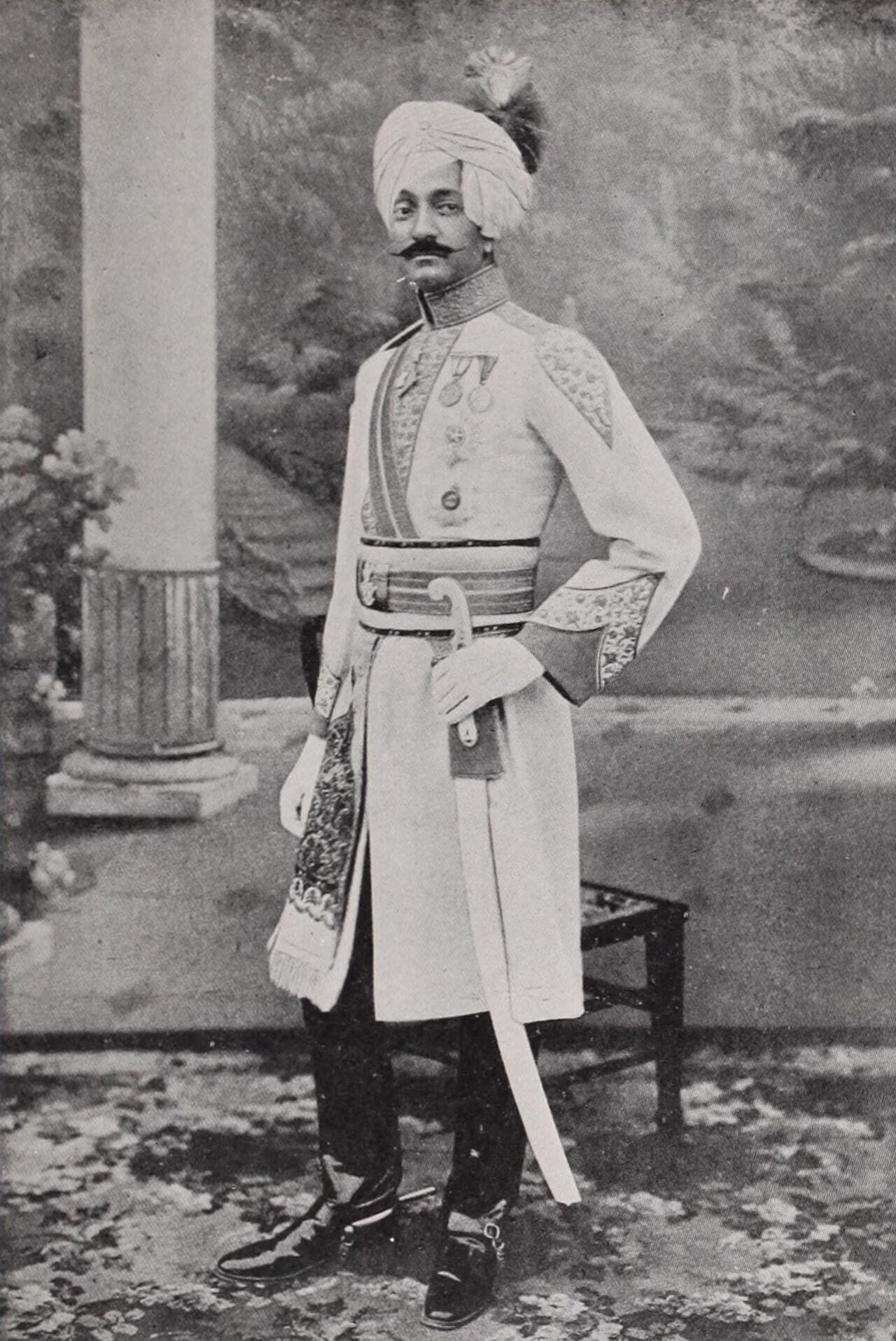

Maharaja of Kishangarh
- Reign: 18 August 1900 – 25 September 1926
- Predecessor: Sadul Singh
- Successor: Yagya Narayan Singh
- Born: 1 November 1884
- Died: 25 September 1926 (aged 41)
- House: Kishangarh
- Father: Sadul Singh

Sir Madan Singh KCSI KCIE was the Maharaja of Kishangarh from 1900 until his death in 1926.

== Early life, family, and education ==
He was born on 1 November 1884 to Sadul Singh and his wife, a daughter of Umaid Singh. He was a Rajput of the Rathore clan. He was educated privately at home. He served with the Imperial Cadet Corps for two years with distinction. He received his further education under the tutelage of W. H. J. Wilkinson.

He married twice. His first marriage, on 9 February 1904, was to a daughter of Fateh Singh, the Maharana of Udaipur. His second marriage was to a sister-in-law of the then Maharaja of Bhavnagar. By his second wife, he had three daughters.

== Reign ==
He succeeded his father as the Maharaja of Kishangarh on 18 August 1900. However, owing to his minority, the Government of India placed the administration of Kishangarh under a State Council, which was to act in accordance with the advice of the resident.

He was invested with full administrative powers on 11 December 1905. Soon afterwards, he was compelled to confront a rebellious noble—the jagirdar of Fatehgarh—who held his estate on military tenure from the state. He appointed a commission composed of the leading nobles of his state to bring the jagirdar to trial. The commission found the jagirdar guilty. Acting on the commission’s decision, he deposed that noble but granted him a pension for his maintenance.

Upon Germany’s entry into the Great War, he placed all resources of his state at the disposal of the British government. He also offered his personal services, which were accepted. In September 1914, he proceeded to Europe with the Indian Expeditionary Force. On 7 December 1914, he was appointed to John French's staff. He returned to India due to ill health on 20 February 1915.

== Personal interests ==
=== Music ===
He loved music. Famous Indian musicians often visited his state. In the evenings, he would listen to them for hours. He gave generous rewards to those who impressed him.

=== Sports ===
He was an avid player of competitive polo. He had a reputation as one of the leading polo players in India.

== Death ==
He died of heart failure on 25 September 1926. Yagya Narayan Singh succeeded to his title, rank, and dignity on 24 November 1926.

== Titles, styles, and honours ==
=== Titles and styles ===
His full style was: "His Highness Umdai Rajahai Buland Makan Maharaja Shri Madan Singh, Maharaja of Kishangarh."

=== Honours ===
He was appointed an honorary Captain in the army in March 1908. He was made a Knight Commander of the Order of the Indian Empire in 1908 and a Knight Commander of the Order of the Star of India in 1911. He received the honorary rank of Major at the Delhi Durbar in 1911. He was mentioned in dispatches by John French in February 1915. He received a personal salute of 17 guns for his services during the World War I. He was promoted to the honorary rank of Lieutenant-Colonel in August 1917.
