= Sanchar =

Indian Marathi daily broadsheet newspaper

- Language: Marathi
- City: Solapur
- Country: India

Sanchar is an Indian Marathi daily broadsheet newspaper based in Solapur, India. It was founded by Shri M B Kadadi, Ranga Vaidya & Raman Gandhi on 13 October 1961, and is currently owned by Sangam Papers Corporation. The current Editor, Printer, Publisher of "Sanchar" is Mr. Dharmraj Annaraj Kadadi. Mr Annaraj Dharmraj Kadadi & Smt Sushila Raman Gandhi are the other Partners in Sangam Papers Corporation. The office of "Sanchar" is situated at Sanchar Building, Hotgi Road, Solapur 413003 (Maharashtra, India)
