= Mohkam Singh (ruler) =

Maharaja of Kishangarh (1839 - 1841)

- Umdai Rajhai Buland Makan

Maharaja of Kishangarh
- Reign: c. 1839 – c. 1841
- Predecessor: Kalyan Singh
- Successor: Prithvi Singh
- Born: c. 1816
- Died: c. 1841
- House: Kishangarh

Mohkam Singh (or Mokham Singh) was the Maharaja of Kishangarh from 1839 until his death in 1841.

== Early life ==
He was born in 1816 to Kalyan Singh. When, in 1832, affairs in Kishangarh fell into serious disorder, his father abdicated in his favour but retained his styles, titles, and status as ruler.

He married a daughter of Maharajkumar Amar Singh of Udaipur.

== Reign ==
When his father died in Delhi in 1839, he succeeded him as the Maharaja of Kishangarh.

== Death ==
He died in 1841 and was succeeded by Prithvi Singh.
