= Punya Nagari =

Indian newspaper

Punya Nagari पुण्य नगरी

- Front page, 2023
- Type: Daily newspaper
- Format: Broadsheet
- Owner: Punya Nagari Newsgroup
- Founder: Muralidhar Shingote
- Founded: 1999;23 years ago
- Language: Marathi
- Country: India
- Circulation: 416,625
- Sister newspapers: Mumbai Choufer; Aapla Vartahar; Yashobhoomi; Karnataka Malla; Tamil Times; Hindmata
- Website: http://www.epunyanagari.com/

Punya Nagari is a Marathi language daily newspaper published in Maharashtra. It was established in 1999 by Muralidhar Shingote. According to the Audit Bureau of Circulations, its average circulation is 416,625. Punya Nagari newspaper is published from Mumbai, Nashik, Nanded, Pune, Ahmednagar, Thane, Nagpur, Dhule, Jalgaon, Kolhapur, Latur, Akola, Amravati, Aurangabad, Satara and Solapur.

== History ==
Baba Shingote (Murlidhar Shingote), the founder of Punya Nagari, reached Mumbai for work and business after dropping out school. Initially he selling fruit, then worked with Buwasheth Dangat and sell newspaper.

In 1994, Shingote started an evening daily newspaper named Mumbai Chaufer. Followed by Aapala Vartahar, Yasobhoomi, Karnataka Malla, Tamil Times, Hindmata and in 1999 he started Punya Nagari.
