= Deora (clan) =

Rajput clan

- Parent family: Chauhan Dynasty
- Country: India
- Current region: Marwar; Sirohi
- Founded: 1311
- Founder: Deoraj
- Estate: Sirohi State

Deora (Hindi: देवड़ा, romanized: Devrā) or Devda, Devra is an Indian clan of Rajputs. They were an off-shoot of the Chauhan Rajputs and claim Agnivanshi descent. The Deora dynasty historically ruled over Bhinmal, Sirohi and Chandravati. Rao Deoraj was the progenitor of the Deora clan.

== History ==
The Deora dynasty traces its origin to Rao Lakha (Lakhan) of Nadol. Two theories describe the origin of Deoras. According to Nainsi ri Khyat, the wife of Asraj, a descendant of Chauhan Lakhan, was Devi Swaroop. Hence his descendants were called Deora. At the time when Vacachhadaldevi became his wife, Asraj's place was Nadol and Cheeba is also a branch of Deoras. Alternatively, the essence of Bankidas's statements is that the queen of Songare named Mahansi as a goddess. His son was Deva. His descendants are Deora. Along with this, the descendants of Deva's brothers Bala, Cheeba and Abah have been written as Deora.Sirohi sword was produced under the rule of the Deora Rajputs of Sirohi. The Deora's guru or royal priest (Rajpurohit) was the Udesh Rajpurohit, and the Udesh Rajpurohit is found in Sirohi and is also found in abundance in Sayla, Jalore.

== States ==
=== Bhinmal Abu State ===
Shobhit, son of Nadaul ruler Lakshman, established his kingdom in Bhinmal. Shobhit was succeeded by Mahendra, son of Asraj (Ashwaraj), son of Lakshman. After Mahendra, Sindhuraj (Machharika), Pratap (Alhan), Asraj, Jendraraj, Kirtipal, Samarsi, Pratap, Shasayanandan Bijad and Lumbha followed. Lumbha captured Chandravati and Abu from the Paramaras around 1311 and got the Achaleshwar temple renovated in 1329 AD. Lumbha died around 1321 AD. After him came Tej Singh, Kanhadde, Samant Singh, Salkha and Raimal.

=== Sirohi ===
Chandravati and Shivabhan, son of Abu's ruler Raimal Deora, expanded his kingdom and built a fort for security on Saranva hill. They established Shivpuri in 1405. His son Sahasmal established a new city two miles away from Shivpuri in 1425 AD which was called Sirohi.

== Notable people ==
=== Rao Lumbha ===
Captured Chandrawati from Parmaras started the rule of Deora dynasty in 1311A.D.

=== Maharao Surtan Singh ===
Fought with Mughal forces in battle of Dattani.
