= Sirohi State =

Former Hindu kingdom in present Rajasthan (India)

Coordinates: 24°53′N 72°52′E

Kingdom of Sirohi Sirohi State
- 1311–1949
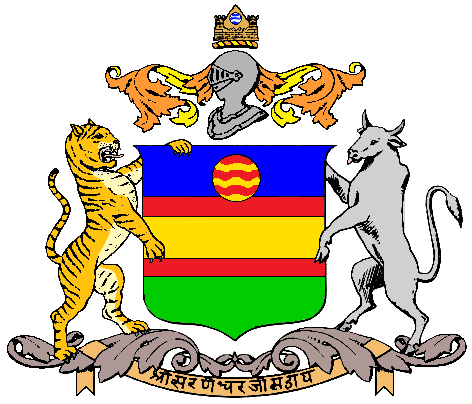
- Flag Coat of arms

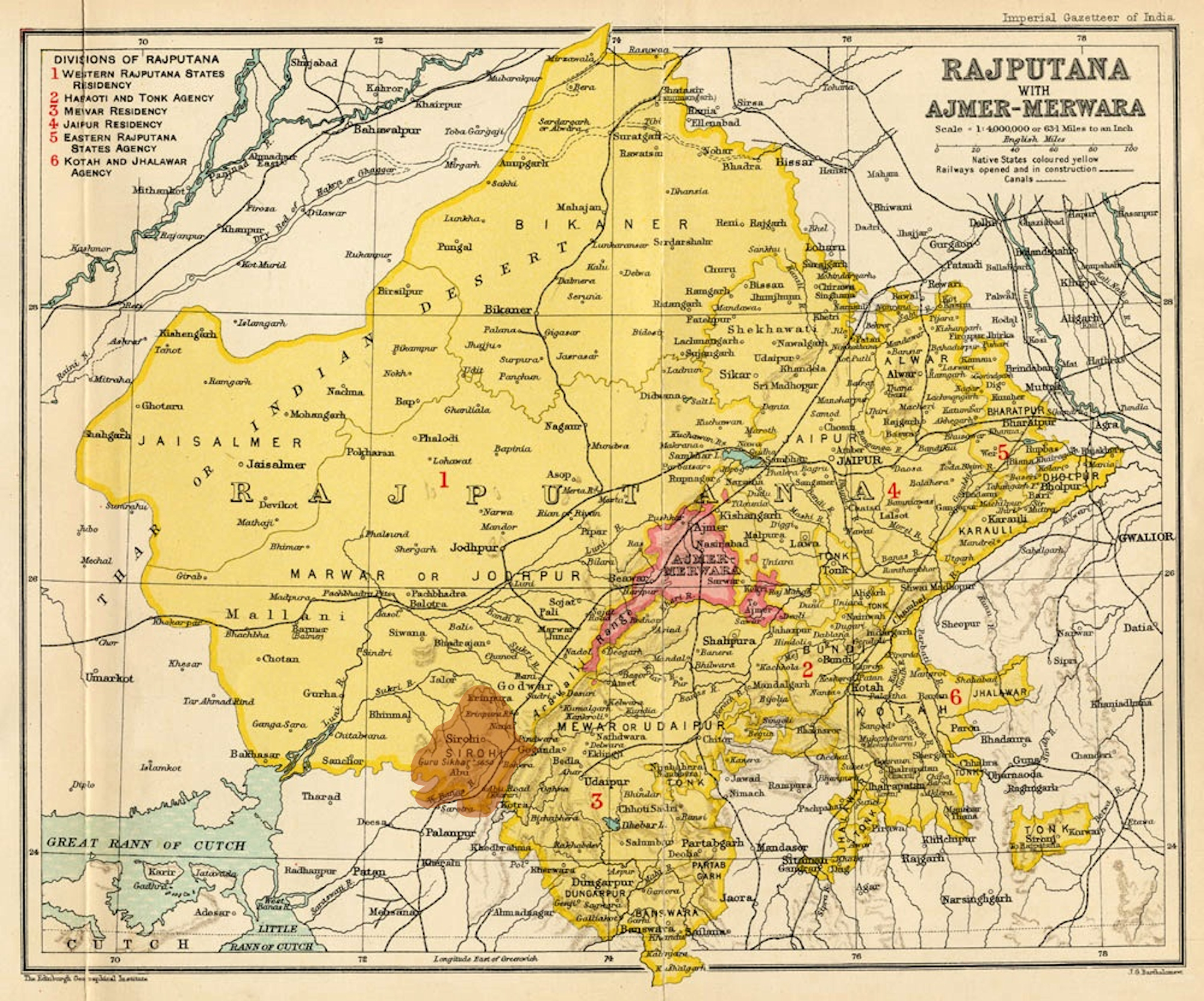
- Sirohi State (orange) within Rajputana (yellow), in 1909
- Status: Sovereign monarchy (1311–1823); Princely state of the British East India Company (1823–1858) and India (1858–1947)
- Capital: Chandravati (1311–1405); Shivpuri (1405–1425); Sirohi (1425-1947)
- Religion: Hinduism
- Government: Monarchy
- History
  - Established: 1311
  - Accession to the Union of India: 1949
- Today part of: India

Kingdom of Sirohi, known as Sirohi State in colonial times, was a kingdom and later princely state in present-day Rajasthan state of India. The state was founded in 1311 CE by the Deora subclan of Chauhan Rajputs and lasted for six centuries till 1949 CE.

The Sirohi sword is a traditional Indian weapon originating from the town of Sirohi.

== Geography ==
Sirohi State was in the Rajputana agency. It had an area 1,964 square miles (5,090 km^{2}) The territory was much broken up by hills and rocky ranges; the Aravalli range divided it into two portions, running from north-east to south-west. The south and south-east part of the territory is mountainous and rugged, containing the lofty Mount Abu, an isolated mass of granite rock, culminating in a cluster of hills, enclosing several valleys surrounded by rocky ridges, like great hollows. On both sides of the Aravallis the country is intersected with numerous water channels, which run with considerable force and volume during the height of the rainy season, but are dry for the greater part of the year. The only river of any importance is the Western Banas.

In 1911 the Encyclopædia Britannica Eleventh Edition recorded that a large portion of the state was covered with dense jungle, in which wild animals, including the tiger, bear and leopard, abounded; and that the climate was on the whole dry (in the south and east there was usually a fair amount of rain. On Abu the average annual rainfall is about 64 inches (160 cm), whereas in Erinpura, less than 50 miles (80 km) to the north, the average fall is only between 12 and 13 inches (30 and 33 cm).

During the 19th century the Rajputana Railway was built. It traversed the state, and a station was built at Abu Road, 28 miles (45 km) south of the town of Sirohi.

In 1901 the population of the state was 154,544, showing a decrease of 17% in the decade, due to the results of famine. Gross revenue was £28,000, tribute to the British Raj was £450. The population of the town of Sirohi was 5,651 and its main business was the manufacturing of sword-blades and other weapons. The Sirohi sword is noted for its craftsmanship.

== History ==
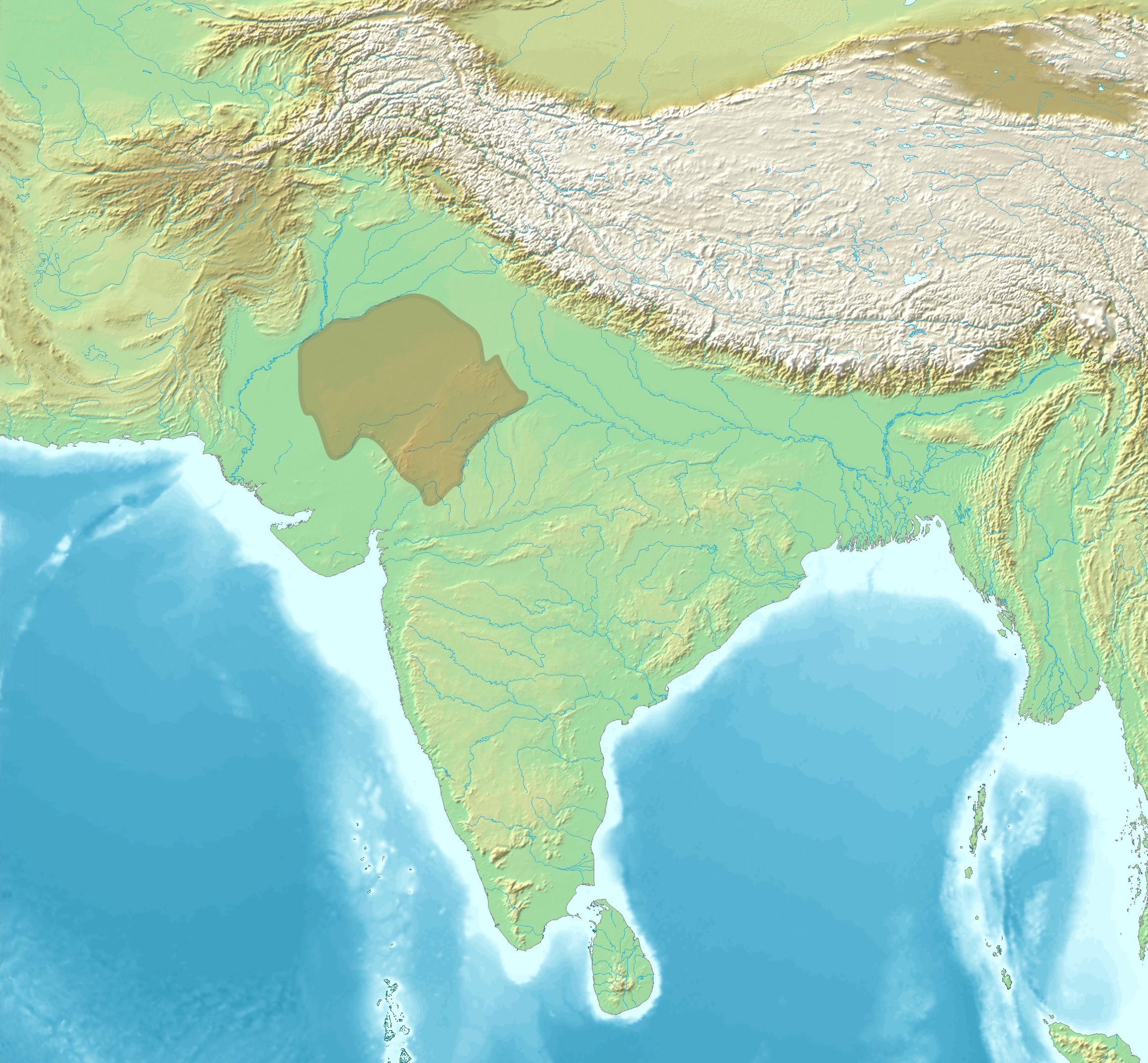
Location of Sirohi within Rajputana circa 1525, with neighbouring polities, on the eve of the establishment of the Mughal Empire.

Sirohi State was founded by Maharaja of Deora Rajputs before c. 1311, and formed the area into a state. In 1405, then-ruler Shivabhan established the capital of the state at Shivpuri, 3 kilometers east of the present-day town of Sirohi. In 1425, Rao Sains Mal built the town of Sirohi, while later became the capital of the state. The rulers of this state belong to Deora Chauhan clan of Rajputs. In 1452, the state was attacked by Rana Kumbha of Mewar.

During the early years of the 19th century, Sirohi suffered much from wars with Jodhpur and the hill tribes of the area. The protection of the British was sought in 1817; the pretensions of Jodhpur to suzerainty over Sirohi were disallowed, and in 1823 a treaty was concluded with the British government. Sirohi became a self-governing princely state, and part of the Rajputana Agency.

For services rendered during the Revolt of 1857, the Rao received a remission of half his tribute. Rao Keshri Singh (ruled 1875-1920) and his successors were granted the title Maharao (equivalent to Maharaja) in 1889.

When India became independent in 1947, there was no immediate consensus about whether Sirohi State should be merged with the new states of Bombay or Rajasthan. Initially, the area under Sirohi State was merged into Bombay 1949, but was transferred to Rajasthan in 1950.

== List of rulers ==
Rao Alhana, the Chauhan ruler of Nadol, was the ancestor of rulers of Jalor, Chandrawati and Sirohi.

=== List of Raos ===
Raos of Jalore

- Rao Alhana
- Rao Kirtipal – founder of Jalore in 1181, and ancestor of the Songara Chauhan clan.
- Rao Samarsinha
- Rao Udaysinha
- Rao Man Singh I (1213–1228)
- Rao Devraj (1228–1250)
- Rao Vijayraj Singh (1250–1311)

Raos of Chandrawati

- Rao Lumba (1311–1321)– founder of Sirohi in 1311
- Rao Tej Singh (1321–1336)
- Rao Kanhar Dev (1336–1343)
- Rao Samant Singh (1343–?)
- Rao Salkha (?–1374)

Raos of Sirohi

- Rao Ranmal (1374–1392)
- Rao Sobhajit (Shivbhan) (1392–1424)
- Rao Sahasmal (Sainsmal) (1424–1451)
- Rao Lakharaj Singh (Lakha) (1451–1483)
- Rao Jagmal I (1483–1523)

=== List of Maharaos ===
- Maharao Akshayraj I (Akheraj) (1523–1533)
- Maharao Rai Singh (1533–1543)
- Maharao Dudaji (Durjan Sal) (1543–1553)
- Maharao Udai Singh I (1553–1562)
- Maharao Man Singh II (1562–1572)
- Maharao Surtan Singh (Surtan Deora)(1572–1610)
- Maharao Rai Singh II (1610–1620)
- Maharao Akheraj II (1620–1673)
- Maharao Udaibhan II (1673–1676)
- Maharao Varisal Singh I (1676–1697)
- Maharao Surtan Singh II (1697),(deposed)
- Maharao Chattarsal Singh (Durjan Singh) (1697–1705)
- Maharao Umaid Singh (Maan Singh III) (1705–1749)
- Maharao Prithviraj Singh (1749–1772)
- Maharao Takhat Singh (1772–1781)
- Maharao Jagat Singh (1781–1782)
- Maharao Bairisal II (Varisal) (1782–1809)
- Maharao Udaibhan Singh III (1809–1817)
- Maharao Sheo Singh (1817–1846)
- Maharao Umaid Singh II Bahadur (1862–1875)
- HH Maharao Sir Kesari Singh Bahadur (1875–1920)
- HH Maharao Sir Sarup Ram Singh Bahadur (1920–1946)
- HH Maharao Tej Ram Singh Bahadur (1946–1947)
- Maharani Krishna (Kunverba) (1946–1947)

=== Titular ruler ===
- Maharao Tej Ram Singh Bahadur (1947–1950)
- Maharao Abhai Singh Bahadur (1950–1998)

• Maharao Raghubir Singh Bahadur (1988 - In Present

== Revenue system ==
The traditional practice of revenue collection consisted of bhog batai and halbandi. Bhog batai, the more prevalent practice, consisted of direct collection of a part of the harvested produce by the state. In some areas of the state, halbandi was used, under which a cash tax was imposed on the implements used by farmers. In 1904, a new revenue-collection system was introduced which consisted of revenue collection based on average productivity of the cultivated area as the criterion for payment. From the state's perspective, the new revenue system was largely successful, leading to a large increase in the state's revenue.

== See also ==
- Jodhpur State
- Udaipur State
- Chahamanas of Naddula
- Chahamanas of Jalor
- Rajputana
