= Kishangarh State =

Princely state in India (1611–1947)

Coordinates: 26.57°N 74.87°E

- Princely State of British India
- 1611–1947
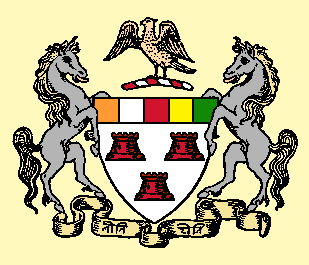
- Flag Coat of arms

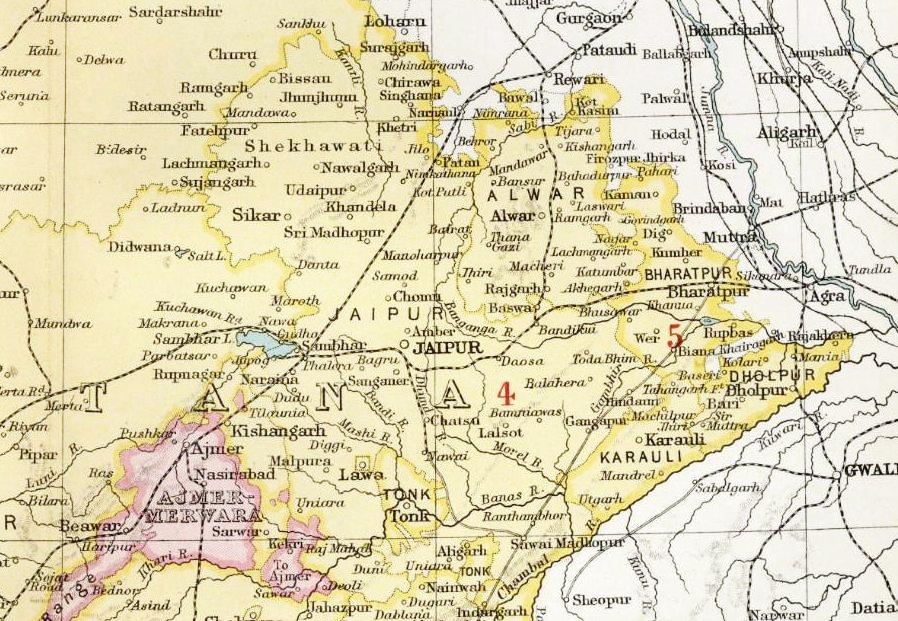
- Kishangarh State in the Imperial Gazetteer of India
- Area
  - 1931: 2,210 km^{2} (850 sq mi)
- Population
  - 1931: 85,744
- History
  - Established: 1611
  - Indian independence: 1947
Succeeded by
Republic of India
- Today part of: Rajasthan, India

Kishangarh State was a Princely State in central Rajputana territory of British India from 1611 to 1948. It was founded by the Jodhpur prince Kishan Singh in the year 1611.

Kishangarh State was located between 25° 49′ and 26° 59′ in the north, and 70° 49′ and 75° 11′ east. Bordered on the North and northwest by Jodhpur State in Marwar region; on the east by Jaipur State in Dhundhar; on the west and southeast by the Ajmer District then the British province of Ajmer-Merwara and on the extreme south by Shahpura State in Bhilwara.

== History ==
Kishan Singh, who was the son of Mota Raja Udai Singh of Jodhpur-Marwar left his family's lands for the imperial Mughal province (Subah) of Ajmer in the year 1596. He was admitted into the service of Mughal Emperor Akbar and within a short span of time having shown his military prowess received the district of "Hindaun" (now in Jaipur); and later, the grant of Setholao along with certain other districts and villages by his brother-in-law Jahangir who held him in high regard. In 1611, he founded the town of Kishangarh which name was then also given to the state. The 13th Chief succeeding Kishan Singh was Raja Kalyan Singh (1797–1832) under whose rule on 26 March 1818, Kishangarh was brought under British Protection.

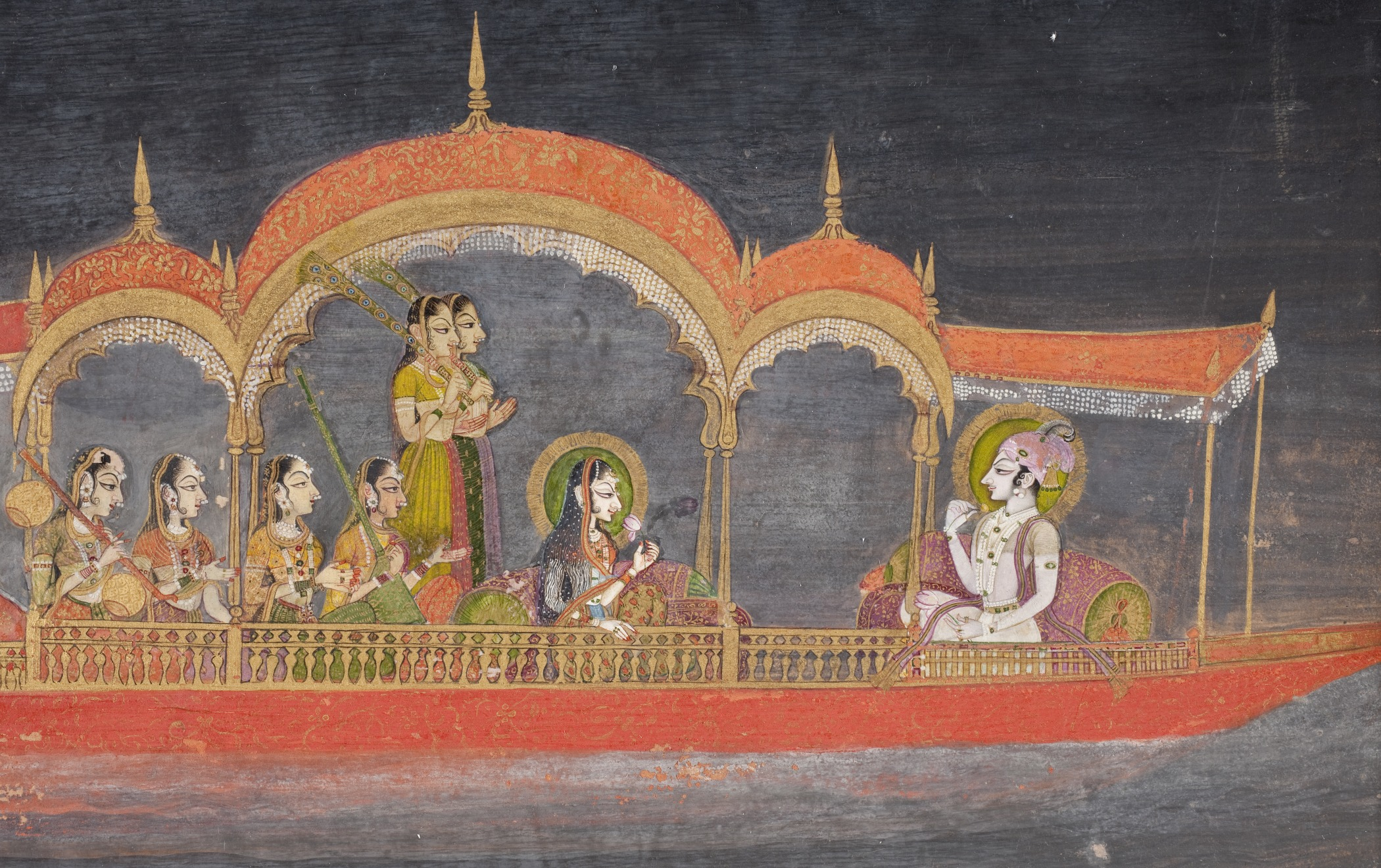
Savant Singh (reigned 1748–1757) and Bani Thani in the Guise of Krishna and Radha Cruising on Lake Gundalao, Kishangarh

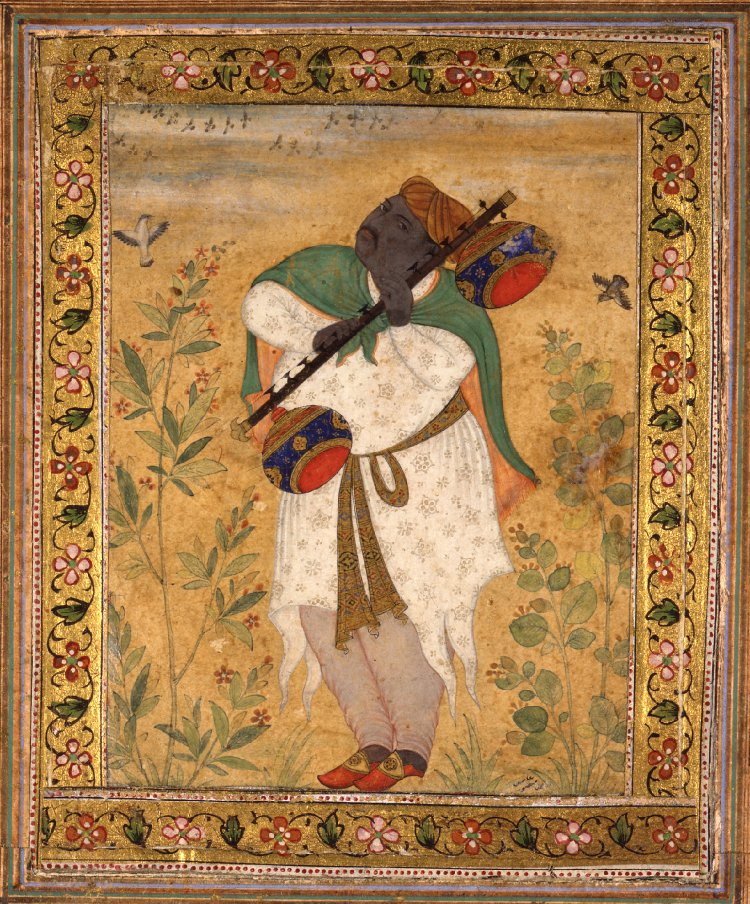
Portrait of Naubat Khan Kalawant, Raja of Kishangarh prior to Kishan Singh, painted by Ustad Mansur. Mughal School, c. 1600. British Museum

.

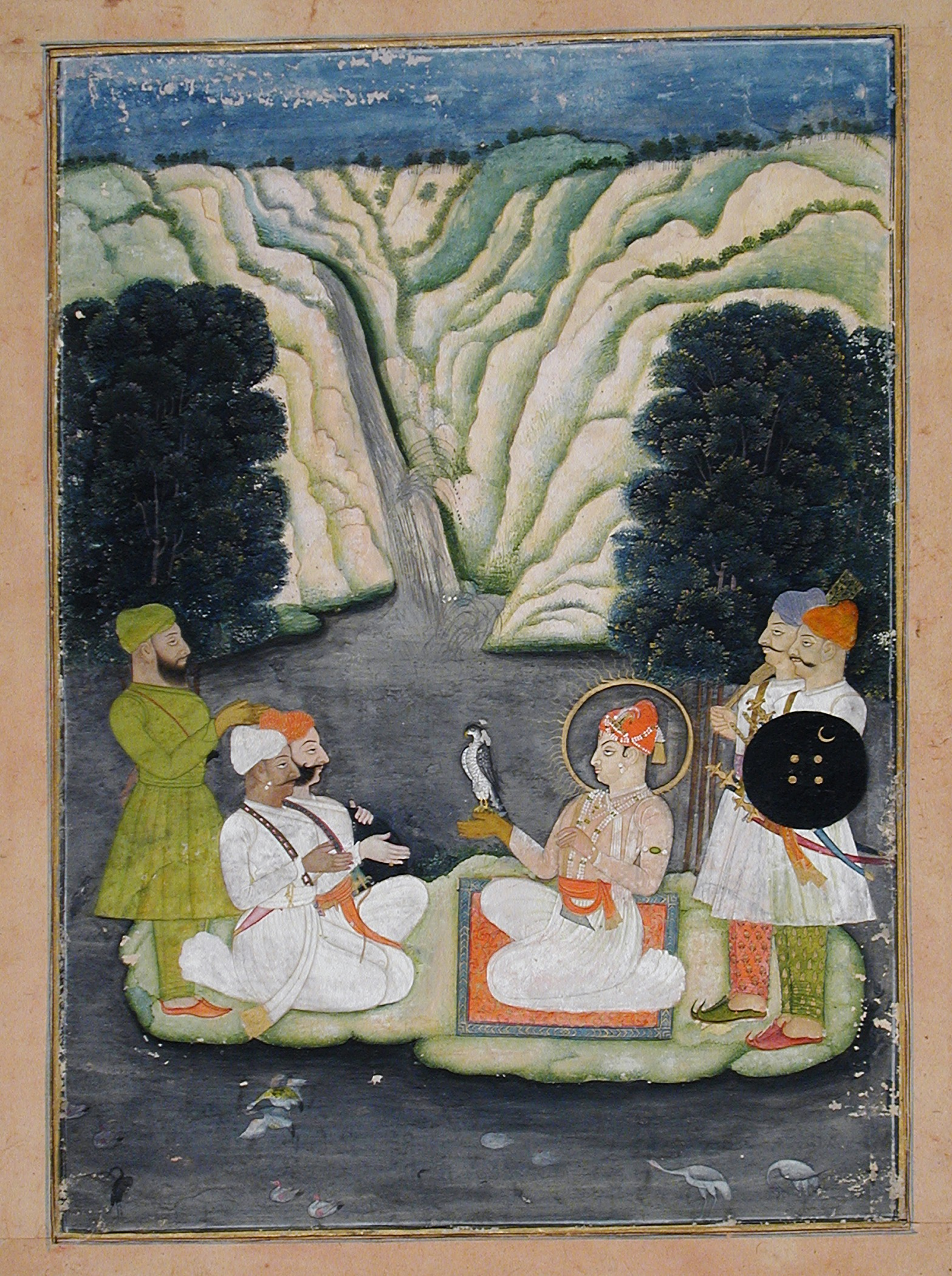
Maharaja Kalyan Singh of Kishangarh state (Reigned 1798–1838)

Kishangarh was the capital of the princely state during the British Raj, which was located in the Rajputana Agency. It had an area of 2210 km^{2} (858 miles²) and a population in 1901 of 90,970. This figure for population represented a decrease of 27% over the census figure of 1891, something presumably attributable to the famine of 1899–1900. Population was 85,744 in 1931. The state enjoyed an estimated revenue of £.30,000/- in 1875 and paid no tribute to the British Raj. In 1840 Prithvi Singh from the Zorawarpura branch of the family was adopted and became the 15th Maharaja of Kishangarh after succeeding his childless predecessor, reigned till his death in 1879, after which he was succeeded by his eldest son Maharaja Sadul Singh.

Lieut Col.HH Maharaja Sir Madan Singh ascended the throne in 1900 at the age of sixteen, at a time when the state was reeling from the impact of a devastating drought. The administration under him and his diwan was widely deemed worthy of approbation; irrigation from tanks and wells was extended and factories for ginning and pressing cotton were started. A social reform movement for discouraging excessive expenditure on marriages made remarkable impact during his reign.

== Rulers ==
The rulers of Kishangarh belonged to the Rathore clan of Suryavanshi Rajputs or of the Solar descent representing a junior branch of the parent state of Marwar.The rulers took the title of "Raja" and later "Maharaja" added under the full sway of British Raj.

- 1611 – 1615: Raja Kishan Singh
- 1615 – 1618: Raja Sahas Mal
- 1617 – 1629: Raja Jag Mal
- 1629 – 1643: Raja Hari Singh
- 1643 – 1658: Raja Roop Singh
- Jun 1658 – Oct 1706: Raja Man Singh (b. 1655 – d. 1706)
- Oct 1706 – Apr 1748: Raja Raj Singh (b. 1674 – d. 1748)
- 1748 – 1781: Raja Bahadur Singh (d. 1781)
- 1748 – 21 August 1765: Raja Sawant Singh (b. 1699 – d. 1765) (in opposition to 1756; from 1756 raja of Roopnagar)
- 21 August 1765 – 16 May 1768: Raja Sardar Singh (b. 1730 – d. 1768) (Raja of Roopnagar; regent for Raja Sawant Singh 1756–65)
- 1781 – 22 Nov 1788: Raja Birad Singh (b. 1737 – d. 1788)
- 22 November 1788 – 5 March 1798: Raja Pratap Singh (b. 1763 – d. 1798)
- 5 March 1798 – 22 May 1839: Maharaja Kalyan Singh (b. 1794 – d. 1839)
- 22 May 1839 – 31 August 1841: Maharaja Mohkam Singh (b. 1817 – d. 1841)
- 31 August 1841 – 25 December 1879: HH Umda-e-Raja-e-Buland Makan Diwan Maharaja Shri Prithvi Singh Bahadur (b. 1838 – d. 1879)
- 25 December 1879 – 18 August 1900: HH Umda-e-Raja-e-Buland Makan Diwan Maharaja Shri Sir Sadul Singh Bahadur (b. 1857 – d. 1900) (from 1 January 1892, Sir Sardul Singh)
- 18 August 1900 – 25 September 1926: Lieutenant-Colonel HH Umda-e-Raja-e-Buland Makan Diwan Maharaja Shri Sir Madan Singh Bahadur (b. 1884 – d. 1926) (from 1 January 1909, Sir Madan Singh)
- 25 September 1926 – 3 February 1939: HH Umda-e-Raja-e-Buland Makan Diwan Maharaja Shri Yagya Narayan Singh Bahadur (b. 1896 – d. 1939)
- 3 February 1939 – 15 August 1947: HH Umda-e-Raja-e-Buland Makan Diwan Maharaja Shri Sumer Singh Bahadur (b. 1929 – d. 1971)

=== Titular Maharaja ===
- 1947 – 1971 Maharaja Sumer Singh
- 1971–present Maharaja Brijraj Singh (b.22 August 1954)

== See also ==
- Naubat Khan
