= Dainik Shivner =

- Founder(s): Vishwanathrao Wable (Shivnerkar)
- Editor: Narendra Wable
- Founded: 1955
- Language: Marathi
- Headquarters: Mumbai, India
- Circulation: 25,000
- Website: www.shivner.com

Dainik Shivner is a Marathi language newspaper founded on 20 November 1955 by Vishwanathrao Wable (Shivnerkar). It is published daily in Mumbai, India and has a circulation of 25,000.

Its stated mission is "to serve the downtrodden, Dalits, labourers and to spread a message of secularism and national integrity." Dainik Shivner, Saamaanya Janatecha Buland Aawaz The paper's editor is Narendra Vishwanthrao Wable .
