= Sirohi sword =

Traditional Indian weapon

Sirohi Sword
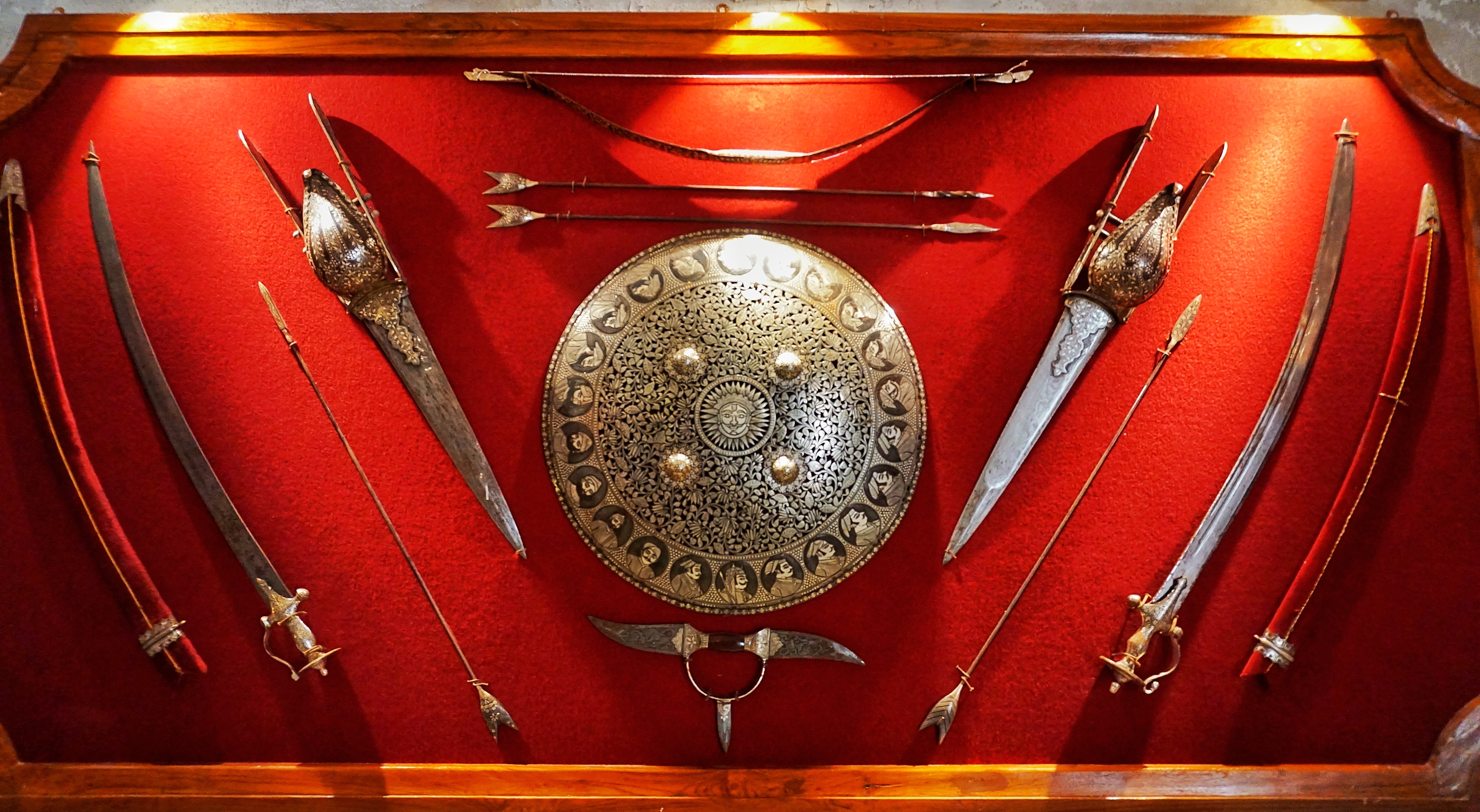
- Traditional Sirohi sword from Rajasthan
- Type: Sword or talwar
- Place of origin: Sirohi, Rajasthan, India

Service history
- In service: 16th century–19th century
- Used by: Rajputs; Marathas; Mughals
- Wars: Mughal–Rajput Wars; Maratha Wars; princely conflicts

Specifications
- Length: 30–36 inches (blade length)
- Blade type: Curved, single-edged
- Hilt type: Indo-Islamic hilt with disc pommel and knuckle guard
- Scabbard/sheath: Wood or metal, often decorated with velvet or leather covering

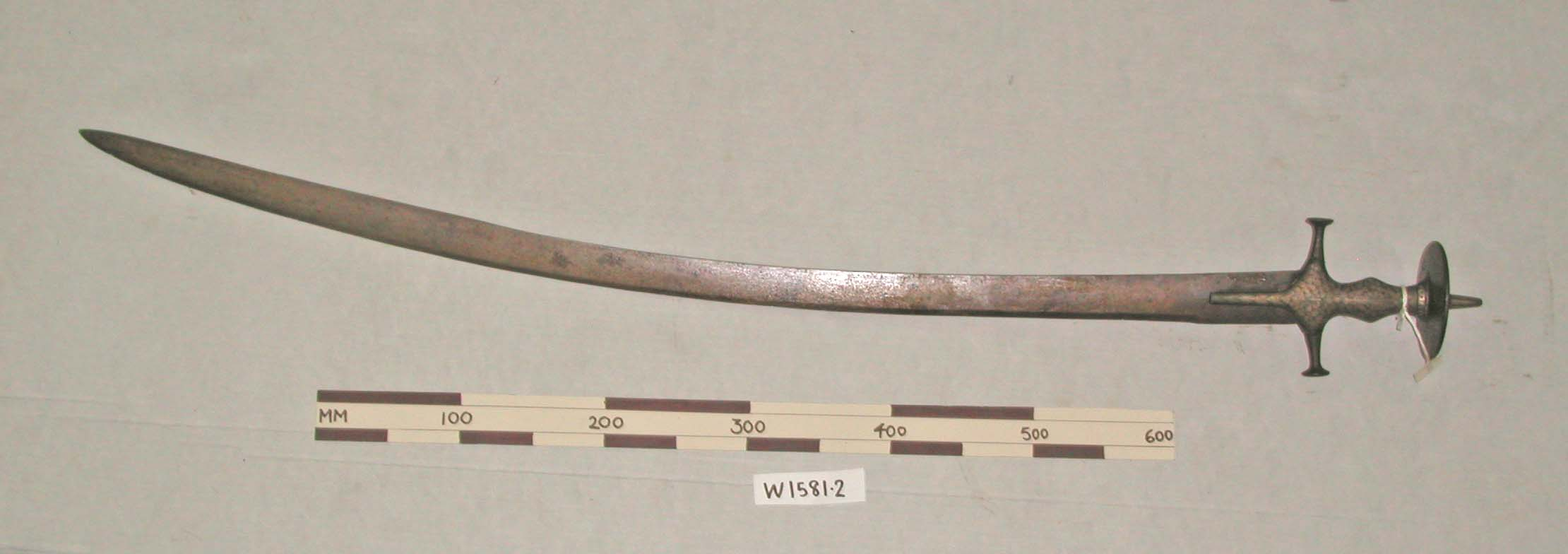
Sirohi sword

The Sirohi sword, or Sirohi talwar, is a traditional Indian weapon originating from the town of Sirohi in Rajasthan. Known for its elegant design, curved blade, and fine steel craftsmanship, it was used by Rajput warriors and other martial groups from the 16th to 19th centuries. It remains an important symbol of Rajput martial culture and Indian weapon-making traditions.

== Etymology ==
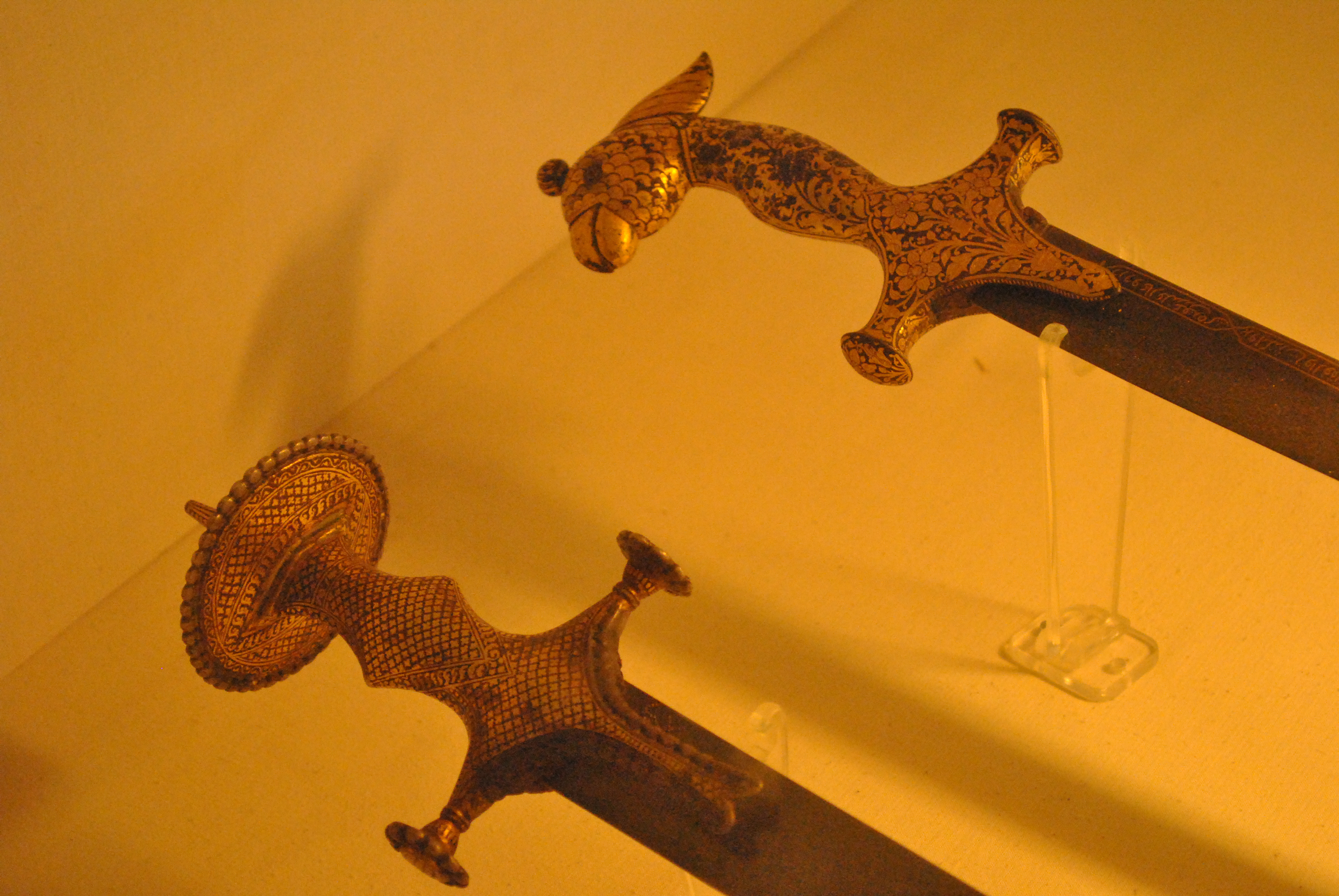
Sword handle, Mehrangarh Fort Museum, Jodhpur, Rajasthan

The Sirohi sword is a traditional Indian weapon originating from the town of Sirohi in the present-day state of Rajasthan, India. Known for its elegant design and sharp curved blade, the Sirohi sword was widely used by Rajput warriors and other martial communities from the 16th to the 19th centuries. It is notable for its lightweight construction, superior steel, and high craftsmanship, making it a prized weapon in both battle and ceremony.

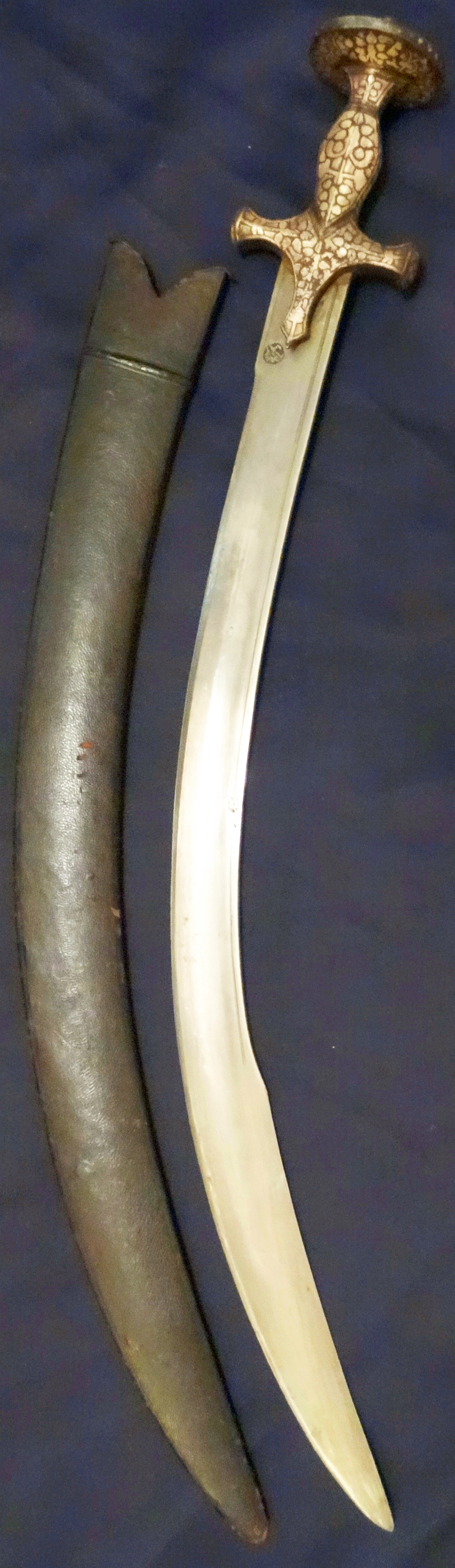
Deeply curved marked blade, 23 inches long, with 8-inch raised back edge, classical talwar-style steel handle decorated with silver koftgari inlay work; original leather-covered scabbard; total length, 28 inches.

== Design and features ==
=== Blade ===
Sirohi swords typically feature a slightly curved, single-edged blade measuring approximately 30–36 inches in length. The curvature allowed for efficient slashing motions, especially from horseback. The blade was made from high-carbon steel, sometimes showing patterns similar to Damascus steel, and was valued for its combination of flexibility, sharpness, and durability.

=== Hilt ===
The hilt was often made of brass or iron, featuring a disc-shaped pommel, a crossguard, and a protective knuckle bow. Many hilts were adorned with silver inlay or koftgari work, especially in ceremonial or noble-use swords. The grip was sometimes wrapped with cloth or wire for better handling.

=== Scabbard ===
The scabbard was typically made of wood or metal and covered with velvet or leather. It often included decorative fittings made from brass or silver and was sometimes engraved with motifs or emblems reflecting the owner's status.

== Historical usage ==
The Sirohi sword was widely used by Rajput, Maratha, and Mughal warriors during the 16th to 19th centuries. It was especially favored by cavalry for its lightweight and balanced design, which allowed for quick strikes and agile movement. During this period, it featured in many battles and regional conflicts, including the Mughal–Rajput Wars and the internal wars between princely states.

Rajput nobles often carried Sirohi swords as symbols of valor, lineage, and honor. Many swords were passed down as family heirlooms and sometimes bore inscriptions or blessings.

== Cultural legacy ==
Today, the Sirohi sword is considered a cultural artifact and is displayed in various museums, including the Mehrangarh fort museum in Jodhpur and the City Palace, Udaipur museum. Miniature versions of the sword are also used in weddings, folk performances, and religious ceremonies, especially in Rajasthan.

Traditional swordsmithing continues on a limited scale in parts of Rajasthan, where artisans produce replicas and ceremonial blades using traditional techniques.

== Comparison with other Indian swords ==
Feature	Sirohi Sword	Talwar	Khanda
Blade Shape	Slightly curved	Heavily curved	Straight, broad
Edge	Single-edged	Single-edged	Double-edged
Weight	Light to medium	Medium	Heavy
Primary Users	Rajputs	Mughals, Rajputs	Rajputs, Marathas, Sikhs
Region	Rajasthan (Sirohi)	North India	North, Central, and South India

== See also ==
- Khanda
- Indian martial arts
- History of Rajasthan
