= Balshastri Jambhekar =

Father Of Marathi Journalism

Darpankar Balshastri Jambhekar
- Born: Bal Gangadhar Shastri Jambhekar; 20 February 1812; Pombhurle, Sindhudurg, British India
- Died: 17 May 1846 (aged 35)
- Other names: Darpankar; Father of Marathi journalism
- Occupations: Journalist, writer, academic
- Employer: Darpan

Bal Ganghadhar Shastri Jambhekar (20 February 1812 – 17 May 1846), also known as Bal Shastri Jambhekar, was an Indian journalist from the Bombay Presidency. He was the first to introduce journalism in Marathi with the first newspaper in this language named Darpan in the early days of British rule in India. Thus he is known as the father of Marathi journalism. January 6 is not the birth anniversary of Bal Shastri Jambhekar. On January 6, 1832, he started Darpan, the first newspaper in Marathi. Therefore, this day is celebrated as Patrakar Din (Journalists' Day) or Darpan Din in Maharashtra.

Since Balshastri Jambhekar himself never mentioned his birth date anywhere, there is some confusion regarding it. However, based on the study of available documents, one of his biographers, Yashwant Padhye, has suggested that his birth date could be February 16, 1812. Due to this uncertainty, the Marathi Vishwakosh does not mention his birth date. However, as per a government order issued in 2021, Balshastri Jambhekar's birth anniversary is officially celebrated on February 20.

== Birth ==
He was born on 20 February 1812 in the remote village of Pombhurle in Devgad taluka (Sindhudurga) in Konkan region of Maharashtra state. Jambhekar became a scholar and researcher in many subjects on adulthood. He was active only for a very short period, but his work left a permanent mark on India. He died in Baneshwar.

== Establishment of First Newspaper in Marathi Language – Darpan ==
Balshastri Jambhekar had grasped correctly the importance and power of the print media in the coming times during British Rule in India. He was sure that if the British were to be overthrown and freedom was to be attained, then it was essential to awaken the masses and the print media was the most useful tool to that end.

The newspaper Darpan was born out of this patriotism and social awareness. He founded Darpan as the first Marathi newspaper. He was editor of this newspaper during the British rule in India. This turned out to be the beginning of Marathi journalism. Balshastri Jambhekar was only 20 years old then. His associates in this phase included people like Govind Kunte and Bhau Mahajan. The first issue of Darpan was published on 6 January 1832. The newspaper was printed both in English and Marathi languages in two separate columns. Marathi was meant for the general public and English was meant for the ruling British. It was priced at 1 rupee. Newspaper was a new idea in India at that time hence there were very few subscribers in the beginning but slowly people appreciated it and agreed with the thoughts expressed in it. The readership grew and it published for eight and half years. The last issue was published in July 1840.

== Social Impact of Darpan ==
He specifically dealt with the issues of widow remarriage in his newspaper. He tried to develop a scientific set of mind in the masses of uneducated Indian, Maharashtra. This resulted in a large-scale debate in the society and finally in a movement for the support of widow remarriage.

He sought to make knowledge more widely accessible to society, and Darpan was one of the means he used for this purpose. He believed that the country’s progress depended in part on the use of scientific knowledge and a rational approach to social issues. He advocated developing a scientific outlook in society and worked to increase public awareness and access to education. Through his work as a social reformer and journalist, he influenced public discourse in Maharashtra and beyond.

== Other contributions ==
Balshastri Jambhekar understood the importance of public libraries. He founded 'The Bombay Native General Library'. He also started 'Native Improvement Society', of which 'Student's Literary and Scientific Society' was an offshoot. Intellectual giants like Dadabhai Navroji and Bhau Daji Lad drew inspiration through these institutions. Dadabhai Naoroji, Atmaram Pandurang and many other prominent scholars, future activists were Bal Shastri's pupils at the Elphinstone College. In 1840 he published first Marathi monthly, Digdarshan (meaning direction in English). He edited this magazine for 5 years. Digdarshan published articles on various subjects including physics, chemistry, geography, history etc.

He had mastery in many languages including Marathi, Sanskrit, English and Hindi. Apart from that he also had a good grasp of Greek, Latin, French, Gujarati and Bengali.

He was the first Indian to have published research papers in the quarterly journal of the Asiatic Society. He was the first person to print Dnyaneshwari in 1845. It was known as the first ever-printed version.

He was also well known as the first professor of Hindi in the Elphinstone College, Mumbai. He also worked as Director of the Colaba Observatory. He wrote books like Neetikatha (stories on morality), Encyclopedic History of England, English grammar, History of India and Mathematics based on Zero.

He was active during the years 1830 to 1846 and worked for the betterment of Maharashtra and India. He had a very short life span of just 34 years. But in those years as well he tried to educate people and develop a scientific mindset. He a stamp of his personality as a social reformer and a journalist during the period 1832 to 1846.

Jambhekar opposed Christian missionary efforts targeted towards the conversion of Hindus unlike Raja Rammohan Roy. His efforts toward the reconversion of a Brahmin-turned-Christian named Shripad Sheshadri displayed his "native fibre" and his commitment to Hindu society and Indian traditions, even while he accepted parts of modern Western knowledge.

== Recognition ==
For these contributions in the form of first Marathi newspaper and first Marathi monthly, he is acknowledged as The Father of Marathi Journalism. The day of publication of the first issue of Darpan is 6 January and it is celebrated as the Journalist Day in Maharashtra in his memory.

While he died in 1846 further recognition was forthcoming in 1901 when Justice Narayan Ganesh Chandavarkar while delivering eulogy for the just died Justice M.G. Ranade ( in whose place he had been appointed as justice at Bombay High Court) noted that in terms of intellectual stature Balshastri Jambhekar was perhaps the only one who could have matched up to the intellectual level of Justice Ranade who he said was one of the foremost of Indian university graduates.
