= Padma Anagol =

Indian historian

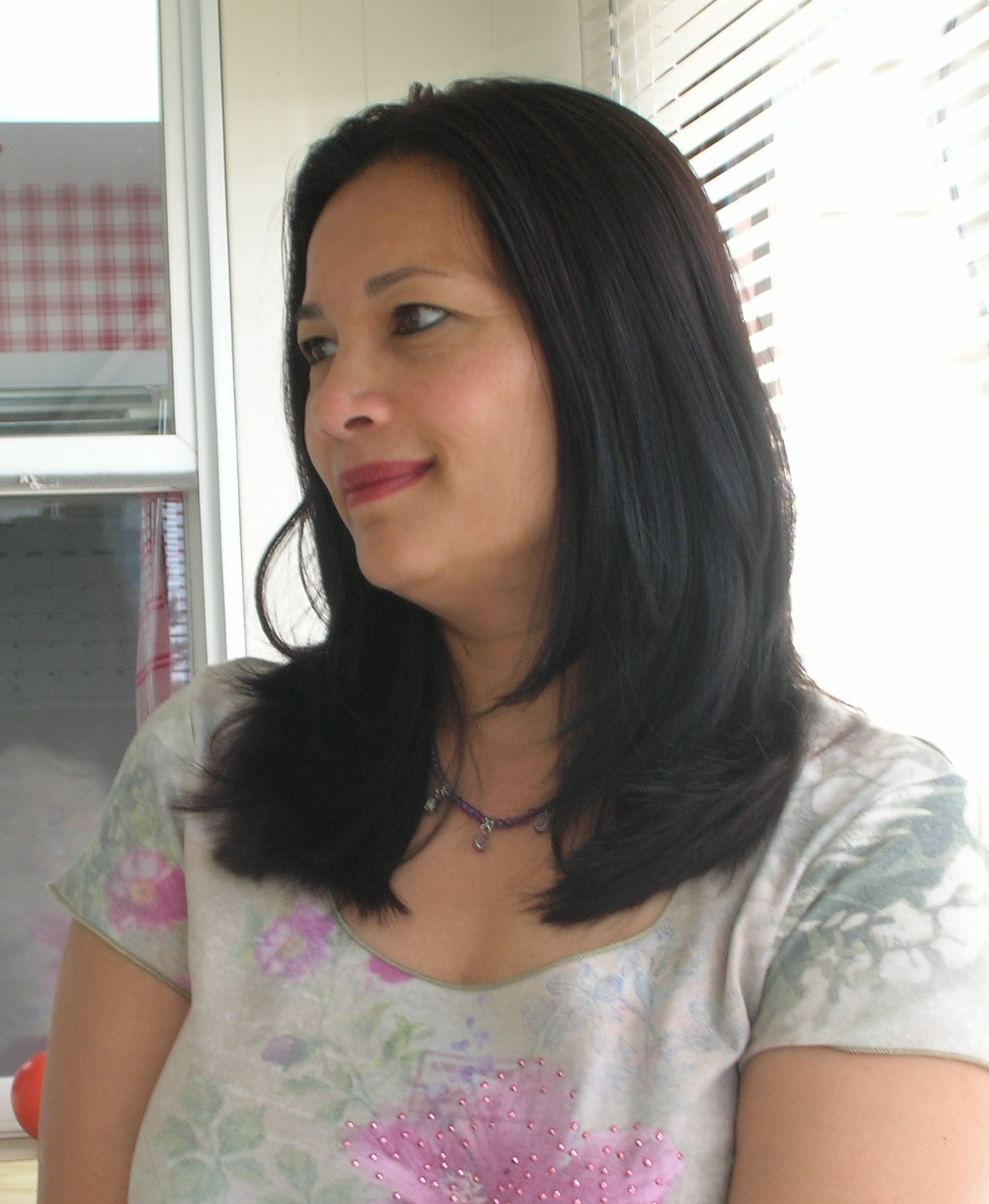
Padma Anagol, Visiting Prof. University of Washington, Seattle, 2007

Padma Anagol is a historian known for her work on women's agency and subjectivities in colonial India. Her work broadly focuses on gender and women's history in colonial British India. Her research interests also include a wide spectrum of topics such as material culture, consumption and Indian middle classes, theory, historiography and periodization of Modern India and comparative histories of Victorian and Indian patriarchies over the issues of social legislation (age of consent).

== Early life and education ==
Anagol comes from the conflict-ridden border area of Belgaum district, Karnataka, India. As a border child, she is well-versed in both Kannada and Marathi, and straddles multiple identities. She was born to Mr. Jayakumar Anagol and Mrs. Kusumavati Anagol. Mr. Jayakumar Angol was a lecturer in philosophy at the Lingaraj College, Belgaum, Karnataka, and worked alongside A. K. Ramanujam before joining the services. Her maternal grandparents, Devendrappa Doddanavar and Lilavati Doddanavar, actively participated in the Indian freedom movement and were awarded 'freedom fighters' pension by the Karnataka State Government.

Anagol graduated from the University of Mysore, Mysore, Karnataka, India. She is an alumna of the Jawaharlal Nehru University, New Delhi, India, where she pursued her Masters in Modern and Contemporary Indian History and did an M.Phil. in International Relations. She was awarded a five year scholarship in 1987 by Indian Council of Social Science Research, Delhi, India, for a Ph.D. in history, which she declined in favour of the Commonwealth Scholarship to the School of Oriental and Asian Studies, University of London, London.

== Career ==
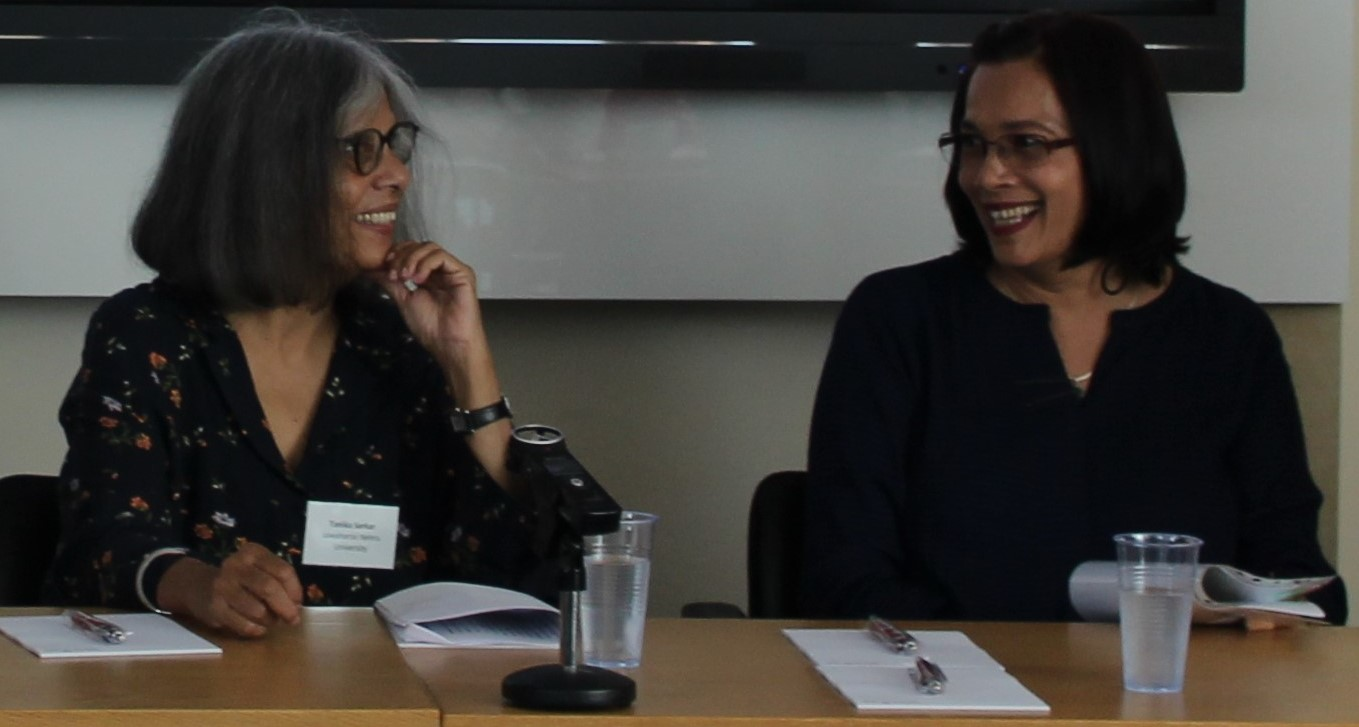
Padma Anagol, in discussion with Tanika Sarkar at the Conference - "Women, Nation-Building and Feminism in India", University of Cambridge

Anagol is a Reader in history at the Cardiff School of History, Religion and Archaeology, Cardiff University, Wales, United Kingdom (UK). She teaches British Imperial and Modern Indian History at the Cardiff University. Fluent in three Indian languages, Anagol mainly uses Marathi (Devanagari script) and Kannada (Dravidian script) for her research work. Much of her research work is anchored in understanding women's subjectivities. She has also held visiting fellowships at various institutions. Before joining as a senior lecturer at the Cardiff School of History, Religion and Archaeology in 1995, Dr. Anagol taught south Asian history at the Bath Spa University, Bath, UK from 1993-95.

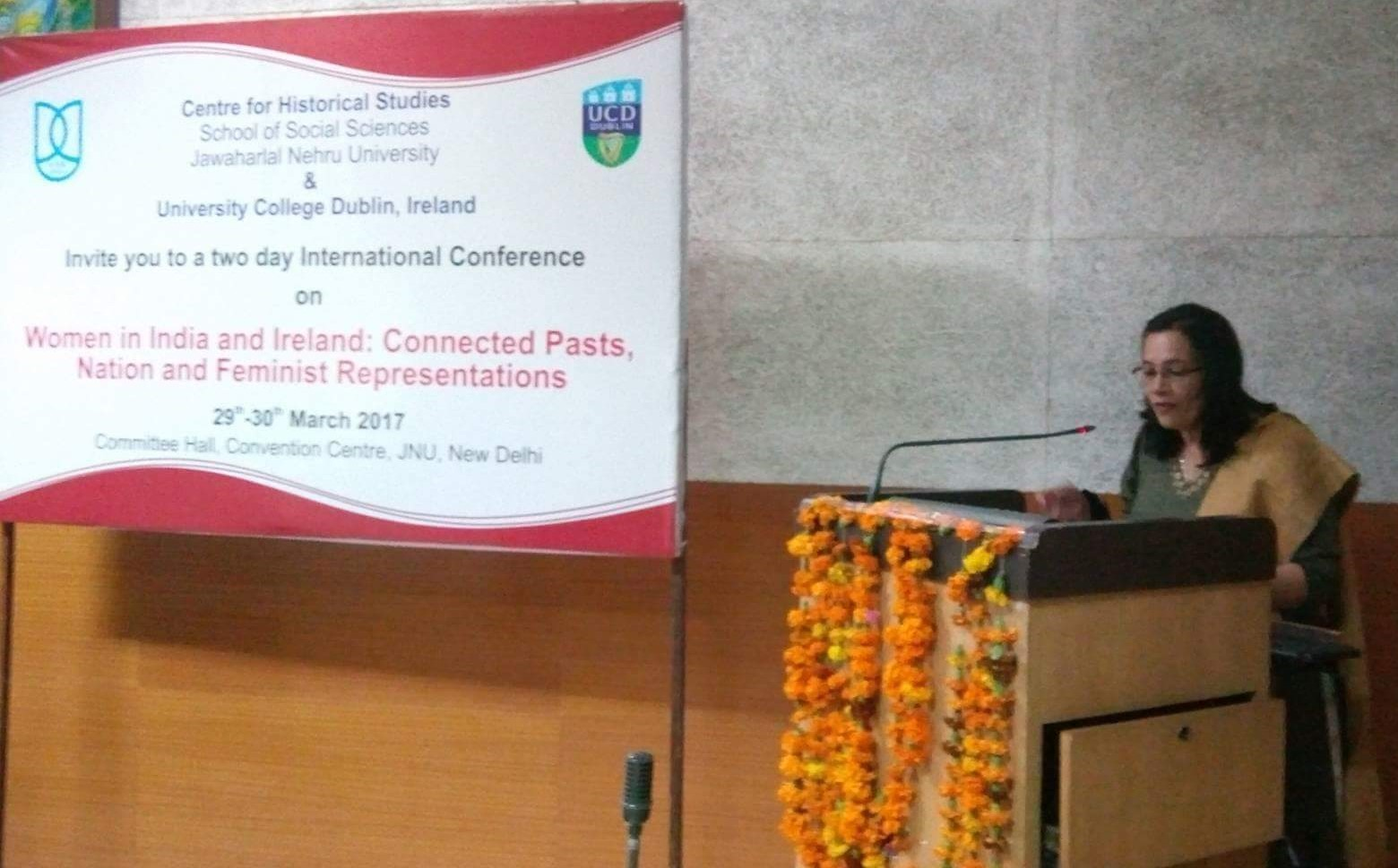
Keynote Address by Padma Anagol, at “Women in India and Ireland Connected Pasts”, on 30 March 2017

Anagol was the editor of Cultural and Social History, a journal published under the aegis of Social History society, UK from 2006-2011. She is the founder member of Asian Literatures in translation, an online journal. She is also a member of the editorial board of South Asia Research and Women's History Review. A believer in popular history, Anagol likes to disseminate information about the past and its uses to public and has taken on the position of Asia Consultant for BBC History Magazine since 2001.

== Selected publications ==
=== Books and edited collections ===
- Anagol, Padma, The Emergence of Feminism in India, 1850-1920, Ashgate Publishing Ltd., 2005. ISBN 075-46-3411-6 ISBN 978-07-5463-411-9
- Anagol, Padma and Grey, Daniel (eds.), 'Gender and Justice in South Asia, 1772-2013', in Cultural and Social History Journal, Special Issue, September 2017. doi:10.1080/14780038.2017.1358972
- Anagol, Padma (Commissioning and General Editor), 'The Partition of India: The Human Dimension', in Cultural and Social History Journal, 6;4, (December 2009), pp. 393–536. [Special Issue on the 60th anniversary of the partition of Indian sub-continent] doi:10.2752/147800409X466254

=== Chapters in books ===
- Anagol, Padma 'The Emergence of Female Criminal in India: Infanticide and Survival Under the Raj', in Anupama Rao and Saurabh Dube (eds.), Crime Through Time, Oxford University Press, India, 2013, pp. 166–180. ISBN 978-0-19-807761-9, ISBN 0-19-807761-0
- Anagol, Padma, 'Indian Christian Women and Indigenous Feminism, c.1850-c.1920', in Clare Midgley (ed.), Gender and Imperialism, Manchester University Press, Manchester, 1998, pp. 79–103. ISBN 978-0-7190-4820-3
- Anagol, Padma, 'Rebellious Wives and Dysfunctional Marriages: Indian Women's Discourses and Participation in Debates over Restitution of Conjugal Rights and Child Marriage Controversy in 1880 and 1890s', in Sumit Sarkar and Tanika Sarkar (eds.), Women and Social Reform in Modern India: A Reader, Volumes I & II, Indiana University Press, Bloomington, 2008, pp. 282–312. ISBN 978-0-253-22049-3
- Anagol, Padma, 'From the Symbolic to the Open: Women's Resistance in Colonial Maharashtra', in A. Ghosh (ed.), Behind the Veil: Resistance, Women and the Everyday in Colonial South Asia, Palgrave Macmillan, Houndmills, 2008, pp. 21–57. ISBN 978-0-230-58367-2; e-book ISBN 9780230583672
- Anagol, Padma, 'Age of Consent and Child Marriage in Colonial India and Victorian Britain', in Bonnie Smith (ed.), The Oxford Encyclopaedia of Women in World History, Volume 4, Oxford University Press, New York, 2007, eISBN 9780195337860; doi:10.1093/acref/9780195148909.001.0001
- Anagol, Padma, 'Age of Consent and Child Marriage in India', in Nancy Naples, Maithree Wickramasinghe and Angela Wong Wai Ching (eds.), The Wiley Blackwell Encyclopedia of Gender and Sexuality Studies, Oxford, Blackwell, 2016. doi:10.1002/9781118663219.wbegss558

=== Articles ===
- Anagol, Padma, "Gender, religion and anti-feminism in Hindu right-wing writings: Notes from a nineteenth-century Indian woman-patriot's text 'Essays in the Service of a Nation'", Women Studies International Forum, Volume 37, March–April 2013, pp. 104–113, doi:10.1016/j.wsif.2012.11.002
- Anagol, Padma, 'Feminist Inheritances and Foremothers: The beginnings of feminism in modern India', Women's History Review, Special Issue on 'International Feminism', VOl.XIX, No.9, 2010, pp. 523–546. doi:10.1080/9612025.2010.502398
- Anagol, Padma, 'Agency, Periodisation and Change in the Gender and Women's history of India', Gender and History, Vol.XX, No.3, Nov.2008, pp. 603–627.
- Anagol, Padma, 'Emergence of Female criminal in India: Infanticide and Survival Under the Raj', History Workshop Journal, Vol. XXXXXIII, Spring 2002, pp. 73–93. doi:10.1093/hwj/53.1.73
- Anagol, Padma, 'The Age of Consent Act (1891) Reconsidered: Women's Perspectives and Participation in the Child Marriage Controversy in India', South Asia Research, Vol.XII, No.2, 1992, pp. 100–119. http://journals.sagepub.com/doi/abs/10.1177/026272809201200202?journalCode=sara
- Anagol, Padma, 'Colonial Ideology and Colonial Literature: The creative world of Rudyard Kipling', Studies in History, Volume III, No.1, 1987, pp. 75–96. http://journals.sagepub.com/doi/abs/10.1177/025764308700300106?journalCode=siha

=== Indian language publications (Marathi) ===
- Anagol, Padma, 'Vasahatkalin Bharatatil Marathi Madhyamvargiya Striyanche ghargutee Baget', (Marathi), 'Family Budgets, Thrift and Household management as reflected in the writings of middle-class Maharashtrian Women in Colonial India', (translation), Marathi Samshodhan Patrika, 53:1, (Oct, 2006), pp. 23–32, ISSN RNI/31743/63

== Recognition and awards ==
She won the student poll for an 'Enriching Student Life Award' at Cardiff University in 2017.

== Forthcoming projects ==
Anagol has embarked on a project of collating primary source materials by bringing together women's voices during the colonial era, under the title of Women in Colonial India:1757-1947: A Primary Source Collection. The collection is a collaboration with Geraldine Forbes and is to be presented in six volumes on broad themes and projects that include: The Body and Sexuality, Law, Religion, Power, Work and Personalities. The proposal for this collection is prompted by three core aims: the need to acquaint students and scholars with a wider range of materials than what is available for studying women in India, and the importance of situating examples of women's agency, resistance, and compliance within the contexts that produced the. The project has a home in the respectable publishing house-Bloomsbury Academic Press and the first volume on 'Body' will be published in 2019.
