= Maharao =

Variation on Indian royal title Maharaja

Maharao is a variation on the Indian (mainly Hindu) royal title Maharaja, also meaning 'great king' in Hindi. It is composed of Maha- 'great' and the royal title Rao, a variation on Raja.

== Ruler title in British India ==
=== Salute states ===
The gun salutes enjoyed by princely states that acceded to the Dominion of India on 14 August 1947, included the following Maharaos:

- Hereditary salute of 17-guns (19-guns local): the Maharao of Cutch
- Hereditary salute of 17-guns: the Maharao of Kotah
- Hereditary salute of 17-guns: the Maharao Raja of Bundi
- Hereditary salutes of 15-guns: the Maharao of Sirohi

== Other use ==
"Maharao" is also used as a given name and a surname in India:

- Dnyanesh Maharao (born 1960), writer and editor from Maharashtra
- Maharao Raghuveer Singh (born 1943), Indian historian

== Sources ==
- Indian princely states
