= List of newspapers in India =

Part of a series on

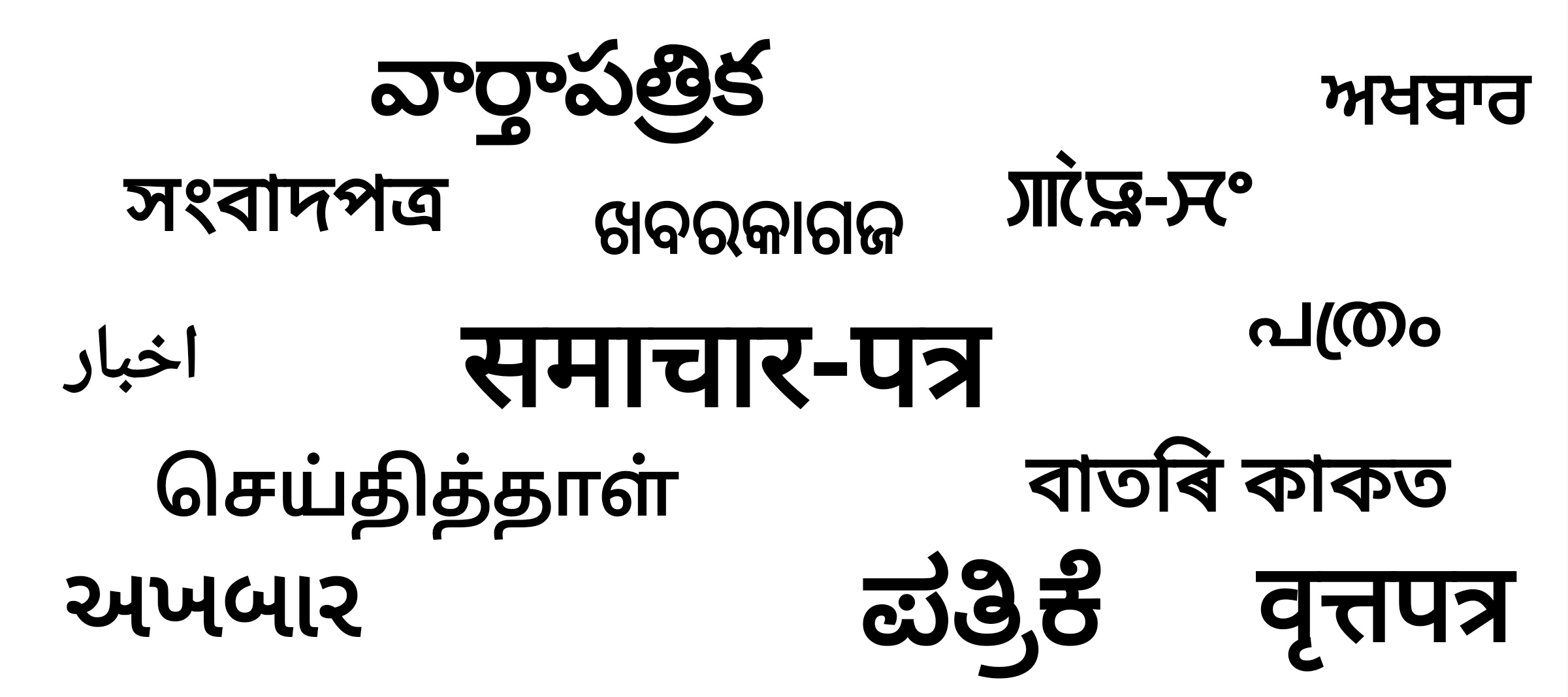

Newspapers of India
Category
Newspapers by languages
- Assamese
- Bengali
- Gujarati
- Hindi
- Kannada
- Malayalam
- Marathi
- Meitei (Manipuri)
- Punjabi
- Tamil
- Telugu
Related
- Newspapers by readership
- Registrar of Newspapers for India
- The Indian Newspaper Society

As of 2025, there were around 17,000 newspaper titles in India. India has the largest newspaper market in the world, with daily newspapers reporting a combined circulation of over 240 million copies as of 2018. There are publications produced in each of the 22 scheduled languages of India and in many of the other languages spoken throughout the country. Hindi-language newspapers have the largest circulation, followed by English and Telugu. Newsstand and subscription prices often cover only a small percentage of the cost of producing newspapers in India, and advertising is the primary source of revenue.

== List ==
Name	Nameplate	Language of publication	Interval of publication	Format	Region of publication	Founded	Circulation (approx.)
Amar Asom		Assamese	Daily	Broadsheet		1997	94,000
Asomiya Khabar		Assamese	Daily	Broadsheet		2001	
Asomiya Pratidin		Assamese	Daily	Broadsheet		1995	195,678
Dainik Janambhumi		Assamese	Daily	Broadsheet		1972	
Dainik Agradoot		Assamese	Daily	Tabloid			
Gana Adhikar		Assamese	Daily	Broadsheet			
Janasadharan		Assamese				2003	
Niyomiya Barta		Assamese	Daily	Broadsheet		2011	80,000
Aajkaal		Bengali			Kolkata, Siliguri, Agartala	1972	160,000
Anandabazar Patrika		Bengali	Daily	Broadsheet	Kolkata, Siliguri, Coochbehar, Durgapur, Asansol, Bardhhaman, Bolpur, Medinipore, Bankura, Purulia, Dhanbad, Ranchi, Guwahati, Silchar, Agartala, Bhubaneswar, Cuttack, Puri.	1889(As Amritabazar Patrika)	1,600,000+
Bartaman Patrika		Bengali	Daily	Broadsheet	Kolkata, Siliguri, Coochbehar, Durgapur, Asansol, Bardhhaman, Midnapore, Bankura, Purulia.	1946	622,907 (as of Jul - Dec 2015)
Dainik Sambad		Bengali	Daily	Broadsheet	Agartala	1965	
Dainik Statesman		Bengali	Daily	Broadsheet	Calcutta, Siliguri	2004	
Ebela		Bengali	Daily	Tabloid	Calcutta		
Ei Samay		Bengali	Daily	Broadsheet	Calcutta	2012	
Ekdin		Bengali	Daily	Broadsheet	Calcutta		
Ganashakti		Bengali	Daily	Broadsheet	Kolkata, Siliguri, Coochbehar, Durgapur, Asansol, Bardhhaman, Midnapore, Bankura, Purulia.	1967	729,000
Kalantar		Bengali	Daily	Broadsheet	Kolkata	1960s	Now disbanded
Jago Bangla		Bengali	Weekly	Broadsheet	Kolkata	2011	529,000
Dainik Jugasankha		Bengali	Daily	Broadsheet	Kolkata, Siliguri, Guwahati, Shilchar	1950	Now disbanded
Sangbad Pratidin		Bengali	Daily	Broadsheet	Kolkata, Siliguri, Durgapur, Asansol, Bardhhaman, Midnapore, Bankura, Purulia.	1971	820,000
Uttarbanga Sambad		Bengali	Daily	Broadsheet	Kolkata, Siliguri, Coochbehar, Jalpaiguri, Guwahati, Alipurduar,	1972	625,000
Ahmedabad Mirror		English			Ahmedabad		
Arunachal Front		English	Daily		Itanagar		
The Asian Age		English	Daily		Kolkata, Delhi, Mumbai, Bangalore	1984	
Bangalore Mirror		English	Daily			1973	
Business Line		English	Daily	Broadsheet	Bangalore, Madras, Coimbatore, Hubli, Hyderabad, Kochi, Kolkata, Calicut, Lucknow, Madurai, Mangalore, Mumbai, Noida, Ayodhya, Trivandrum, Trichy, Vijayawada, Vizag	1994	185,000
Business Standard		English	Daily	Broadsheet	Mumbai, New Delhi, Kolkata, Bengaluru, Coimbatore, Chennai, Ahmedabad, Hyderabad, Chandigarh, Pune, Lucknow, Bhubaneswar, Kochi	1975	189,000
Daily Excelsior		English			Jammu and Kashmir	1965	
Daily News and Analysis		English			Ahmedabad, Bangalore, Indore, Jaipur, Mumbai, Pune	2005	
Deccan Chronicle		English			Bangalore, Madras, Coimbatore, Hyderabad, Kochi, Trivandrum, Vizag	1938	
Deccan Herald		English	Daily		Bangalore, Mangalore, Hubli, Mysore, New Delhi	1948	
DT Next		English	Daily	Broadsheet	Chennai	2015	
Financial Chronicle		English	Daily		Bangalore, Hyderabad, Madras, Mumbai, New Delhi	2008	
Greater Kashmir		English	Daily		Kashmir, Jammu	1987	1,000,000+
Hindustan Times		English	Daily	Broadsheet	Lucknow, Mumbai, Delhi, Patna, Ranchi, Indore, Chandigarh	1924	1,000,000
Imphal Free Press		English, Meitei	Daily		Imphal	1996	
Kashmir Times		English	Daily			1954	
Mid-Day		English	Daily		Bangalore, Delhi, Mumbai, Pune	1979	
Mint		English	Daily	Broadsheet	Ahmedabad, Bangalore, Chandigarh, Delhi, Mumbai, Chennai, Pune, Hyderabad, Kolkata	2007	
Mumbai Mirror		English	Daily		Mumbai	2005	
Mumbai Samachar		English, Gujarati	Daily	Broadsheet	Mumbai	1822	150,000
Nagaland Post		English	Daily		Dimapur	1990	
Newstime		English	Daily	Broadsheet	Hyderabad	1983	
News Today		English	Daily		Chennai	1982	
O Heraldo		English	Daily		Goa	1900	
Orissa Post		English	Daily		Bhubaneswar, Sambalpur, Angul, Rayagada	2011	
Rising Kashmir		English	Daily		Srinagar, Jammu and Kashmir	2008	
Sakaal Times		English	Daily	Broadsheet	Pune	2008	
Sikkim Express		English	Daily		Gangtok, Darjeeling	1976	
Star of Mysore		English				1978	
State Times		English	Daily	Broadsheet	Jammu, Delhi	1996	
Telangana Today		English	Daily	Broadsheet	Hyderabad	2016	
The Afternoon Despatch & Courier		English	Daily	Tabloid	Mumbai	1985	
The Assam Chronicle		English	Daily		Guwahati		
The Assam Tribune		English	Daily	Broadsheet	Guwahati, Dibrugarh	1939	724,598
The Economic Times		English	Daily	Broadsheet		1961	
The Financial Express		English	Daily		Ahmedabad, Bangalore, Chandigarh, Madras, Delhi, Hyderabad, Kochi, Kolkata, Lucknow, Mumbai, Pune	1961	
The Free Press Journal		English	Daily	Broadsheet	Mumbai, Pune, Indore, Bhopal	1930	
The Hans India		English	Daily		Hyderabad, Vizag, Vijayawada, Tirupati, Warangal	2011	
The Hitavada		English	Daily		Jabalpur, Nagpur, Raipur, Bhopal	1911	
The Hindu		English	Daily	Broadsheet	Bangalore, Madras, Coimbatore, Delhi, Hyderabad, Hubli, Kolkata, Kochi, Madurai, Mangalore, Trivandrum, Trichy, Calicut, Vijayawada, Vizag, Meghalaya, Allahabad, Mumbai, patna, Lucknow	1878	1,400,000
The Indian Express		English	Daily	Broadsheet	Ahmedabad, Delhi, Kolkata, Mumbai, Lucknow, Chandigarh, Jammu, Pune, Nagpur, Vadodara	1931	
The Morung Express		English	Daily		Dimapur	2005	
The Navhind Times		English	Daily		Goa	1961	
The New Indian Express		English	Daily		Bangalore, Bhubaneswar, Madras, Coimbatore, Trichy, Hyderabad, Kochi, Mangalore, Trivandrum, Madurai, Vijayawada, Vizag, Calicut, Belgaum, Shimoga	1931	309,252
The North East Times		English				1990	
The Pioneer		English	Daily		Bhubaneswar, Bhopal, Chandigarh, Dehradun, Delhi, Ranchi, Lucknow, Raipur	1865	
The Sentinel		English	Daily	Broadsheet	Guwahati, Dibrugarh, Shillong, Silchar, Itanagar	1983	167800
The Shillong Times		English	Daily		Shillong	1945	
The Statesman		English	Daily		Bhubaneshwar, Delhi, Siliguri	1875	230,000
The Telegraph		English	Daily		Kolkata, Siliguri, Durgapur-Asansol, Bardhhaman	1984	750,000+
The Times of India		English	Daily	Broadsheet	Ahmedabad, Bangalore, Bhopal, Bhubaneswar, Chandigarh, Madras, Coimbatore, Delhi, Goa, Guwahati, Hyderabad, Indore, Jaipur, Kanpur, Kolkata, Kochi, Lucknow, Mangalore, Mumbai, Mysore, Nagpur, Patna, Pune, Raipur, Ranchi, Surat, Shillong, Trivandrum, Trichy, Visakhapatnam, Vijayawada, Madurai	1838	2,830,000
The Tribune		English	Daily		Bathinda, Chandigarh, Jalandhar, New Delhi	1881	380,000
Gujarat Samachar		Gujarati	Daily	Broadsheet	Ahmedabad, Surat, Vadodara, Rajkot, Bhavnagar, Bhuj, Mehsana, Mumbai	1932	
Divya Bhaskar		Gujarati	Daily	Broadsheet	Ahmedabad, Surat, Vadodara, Rajkot, Bhavnagar, Bhuj, Jamnagar, Junagadh, Mehsana	2003	792,022
Sandesh		Gujarati	Daily	Broadsheet	Ahmedabad, Surat, Vadodara, Rajkot, Bhavnagar, Bhuj	1923	
Gujarat Today		Gujarati	Daily	Broadsheet	Ahmedabad	1991	
Jai Hind		Gujarati	Daily	Broadsheet	Rajkot	1948	
Kutch Mitra		Gujarati	Daily	Broadsheet	Bhuj	1947	
Nobat		Gujarati	Daily	Broadsheet	Jamnagar	1957	
Phulchhab		Gujarati	Daily	Broadsheet	Rajkot	1921	
Sambhaav		Gujarati	Daily	Broadsheet	Ahmedabad	1986	
The Prabhat		Gujarati	Daily	Broadsheet	Ahmedabad	1934	
Gujarat Mitra		Gujarati	Daily	Broadsheet	Surat	1863	
Amar Ujala		Hindi	Daily	Broadsheet	New Delhi, Chandigarh, Punjab, Haryana, Himachal Pradesh, Jammu & Kashmir, Uttarakhand, Uttar Pradesh	1948	2,610,000
Dainik Bhaskar		Hindi	Daily	Broadsheet	MP, CG, Rajasthan, Chandigarh, Punjab, Haryana, Jharkhand, Bihar, Himachal Pradesh, Delhi, Jammu & Kashmir, Uttarakhand	1958	4,320,000
Dainik Jagran		Hindi	Daily	Broadsheet	Kanpur, Lucknow, Gorakhpur, Jhansi, Raebareli, Varanasi, Agra, Allahabad, Ayodhya, Aligarh, Bareilly, Meerut, Bhopal, Rewa, Ranchi, Dhanbad, Jamshedpur, Amritsar, Ludhiana, Jalandhar, Bathinda, Patiala, Panipat, Hissar, Patna, Bhagalpur, Muzaffarpur, Darbhanga, Dharamshala, Delhi, Siliguri, Jammu, Udhampur	1942	4,140,000
Dainik Navajyoti		Hindi	Daily	Broadsheet	Jaipur, Ajmer, Jodhpur, Kota, Udaipur	1936	
Hari Bhoomi		Hindi	Daily	Broadsheet	Rohtak, Bilaspur, Raipur, Raigarh, Jabalpur, Delhi	1996	380,000
Jansatta		Hindi	Daily	Broadsheet		1983	
Nava Bharat		Hindi	Daily	Broadsheet	Mumbai, Pune, Nagpur, Nashik, Chandrapur, Amravati, Raipur, Bilaspur, Raigarh, Bhopal, Japalpur, Satna, Chhindwara, Gwalior, Indore	1937	1,830,000
Navodaya Times		Hindi	Daily	Broadsheet	New Delhi	2013	1,46,264
Navbharat Times		Hindi	Daily	Broadsheet	New Delhi, Varanasi, Ayodhya, Lucknow, Gorakhpur, Agra	1946	
Parichay Times		Hindi	Daily	Broadsheet	New Delhi	2004	43,000
Prabhat Khabar		Hindi	Daily	Broadsheet	Ranchi, Jamshedpur, Dhanbad, Deoghar, Patna, Muzaffarpur, Bhagalpur, Gaya, Kolkata, Siliguri.	1984	700,000
Punjab Kesari		Hindi	Daily	Broadsheet	Jalandhar, New Delhi, Bathinda Jalandhar, Chandigarh, Ludhiana, Bhatinda, Panipat, Rohtak, Hisar, Shimla, Palampur	1965	1,170,000
Rajasthan Patrika		Hindi	Daily	Broadsheet	Rajasthan, Chandigarh, New Delhi, Madhya Pradesh, Uttar Pradesh, Bihar, Gujarat, Uttar Pradesh, Maharashtra, Karnataka, Tamil Nadu, West Bengal	1956	1,010,000
Sanmarg		Hindi	Daily		Calcutta, Burdwan, Ranchi, and Bhubaneshwar		
Sarkar Ki Upalabdhiya		Hindi, Urdu	Daily	Broadsheet	Lucknow, Barabanki, Faizabad, Shrawasti.	1993	
Xpert Times		Hindi	Monthly	Broadsheet	Delhi	2026	5,300
Koshur Akhbar		Kashmiri				2005	
Hosa Digantha		Kannada	Daily	Broadsheet	Bangalore, Mangalore, Hubli, Shimoga	1979	
Kannada Prabha		Kannada	Daily		Bangalore, Belgaum, Shimoga	1967	
Lankesh Patrike		Kannada	Weekly			1980	
Prajavani		Kannada	Daily		Bangalore, Hubli-Dharwad, Mangalore, Gulbarga, Davanagere, Mysore, Hospet	1948	
Samyukta Karnataka		Kannada	Daily				
Sanjevani		Kannada	Daily			1982	
Udayavani		Kannada	Daily		Manipal, Mangalore, Udupi, Bangalore, Mumbai, Hubli-Dharwad, Gulbarga	1971	
Varthabharathi		Kannada				2003	
Vijaya Karnataka		Kannada	Daily			1999	
Vishwavani		Kannada	Daily	Broadsheet	Bangalore	1960	
Hai Bangalore		Kannada	Weekly			-NA-	
Vijayavani		Kannada				2012	760,000
Karavali Ale		Kannada	Daily	Broadsheet	Mangalore, South Canara, Udupi, Kasargod	1992	45,000 (as of 2013)
Mangaluru Samachara		Kannada	Daily	Broadsheet	Balmatta, Mangalore, Karnataka	1843	
Mysooru Mithra		Kannada	Daily	Broadsheet	Mysore, Karnataka	1978	
Usha Kirana		Kannada	Daily	Broadsheet	Bangalore, Karnataka	2005	
Sunaparant		Konkani				1987	
Siraj Daily		Malayalam	Daily	Broadsheet	Calicut, Trivandrum, Kochi, Cannanore, Dubai, Oman, Qatar	1984	950,000
Chandrika		Malayalam	Daily	Broadsheet	Calicut, Cannanore, Malappuram, Kochi, Trivandrum, Doha, Dubai, Riyadh, Jeddah	1934	
Deepika		Malayalam	Daily	Broadsheet	Kottayam, Kochi, Cannanore, Trichur, Trivandrum, Calicut	1887	850,000
Deshabhimani		Malayalam	Daily	Broadsheet	Calicut, Kochi, Trivandrum, Cannanore, Kottayam, Trichur, Malappuram, Bangalore, Bahrain	1942	800,000
General		Malayalam	Daily	Broadsheet	Trichur	1976	
Janayugom		Malayalam	Daily	Broadsheet	Trivandrum, Kollam, Kochi, Calicut, Cannanore	1953	
Janmabhumi		Malayalam	Daily	Broadsheet	Kochi, Kottayam, Cannanore, Trichur, Trivandrum, Calicut	1977	15,000
Kerala Kaumudi		Malayalam	Daily	Broadsheet	Trivandrum, Quilon, Alleppey, Kochi, Calicut, Cannanore, Bangalore	1911	
Kerala Kaumudi Flash		Malayalam	Evening daily	Tabloid	Trivandrum, Quilon, Alleppey, Kottayam, Kochi, Trichur, Calicut, Cannanore, Malappuram	2006	
Madhyamam		Malayalam	Daily	Broadsheet	Calicut, Kochi, Trivandrum, Cannanore, Malappuram, Kottayam, Trichur, Bangalore, Riyadh, Dammam, Jeddah, Abha, Dubai, Muscat, Bahrain, Kuwait, Qatar	1987	920,000
Malayala Manorama		Malayalam	Daily	Broadsheet	Kottayam, Calicut, Kochi, Trivandrum, Palakkad, Cannanore, Quilon, Trichur, Malappuram, Pathanamthitta, Alleppey, Mumbai, Madras, Bangalore, Delhi, Mangalore, Bahrain, Dubai, Doha	1888	2,370,000
Mangalam		Malayalam	Daily	Broadsheet	Kottayam, Calicut, Kochi, Trivandrum, Trichur, Idukki, Cannanore	1969	
Mathrubhumi		Malayalam	Daily	Broadsheet	Calicut, Kochi, Trivandrum, Kottayam, Palakkad, Cannanore, Quilon, Trichur, Malappuram, Alleppey, Mumbai, Bangalore, Delhi, Bahrain	1923	1,360,000
Rashtra Deepika		Malayalam	Evening daily	Tabloid	Trivandrum, Quilon, Kottayam, Kochi, Trichur, Palakkad, Malappuram, Calicut, Cannanore	1992	780,000
Thejas		Malayalam	Daily	Broadsheet	Calicut, Trivandrum, Kochi, Cannanore, Kottayam, Riyadh, Jeddah, Dammam	2006	
Kerala Janatha		Malayalam	Six days a week		Thiruvananthapuram	1957	6,362
Kesari		Marathi				1881	
Lokmat		Marathi	Daily		Maharashtra, Goa & Delhi	1971	1,300,000
Deshdoot		Marathi, English	Daily	Broadsheet	Nashik, Ahmednagar, Jalgaon, Dhule, Nandurbar	1996	
Loksatta		Marathi				1948	
Mahanagar		Marathi				1990	
Maharashtra Times		Marathi				1962	
Nava Kaal		Marathi				1921	
Navshakti		Marathi					
Prahaar		Marathi				2008	
Pudhari		Marathi				1937	
Saamana		Marathi				1988	
Sakal		Marathi				1932	
Tarun Bharat		Marathi				1919	
Poknapham		Meitei				1975	
Vanglaini		Mizo				1978	
The Samaja		Odia	Daily	Broadsheet	Bhubaneswar, Cuttack, Sambalpur, Calcutta, Vizag, Rourkela, Berhampur, Balasore	1919	
The Samaya		Odia	Daily	Broadsheet	Bhubaneswar, Balasore, Angul, Berhampur, Sambalpur	October 2, 1996	250,422 (Dec 2009)
Sambad		Odia	Daily	Broadsheet	Bhubaneswar, Cuttack, Angul, Balasore, Sambalpur, Berhampur, Jeypore, Rourkela		
Dharitri		Odia	Daily	Broadsheet	Bhubaneswar, Sambalpur, Berhampur, Angul-Dhenkanal, Balasore, Rayagada, Upakula Orissa	November 24, 1974	
Pragativadi		Odia	Daily	Broadsheet	Bhubaneswar	1985	
Punjabi Tribune		Punjabi	Daily		Chandigarh	August 15, 1978	
Ajit		Punjabi	Daily		Jalandhar	1941	
Rozana Spokesman		Punjabi	Daily		Chandigarh		
Jagbani		Punjabi	Daily		Jalandhar, Ludhiana	1978	
Daily Punjab Times		Punjabi	Daily	Broadsheet	Jalandhar		
Sudharma		Sanskrit	Daily	Broadsheet	Mysore	1970	2,000
Dinamalar		Tamil	Daily	Broadsheet		1951	850,000
Dinamani		Tamil	Daily	Broadsheet		1933	
Dinakaran		Tamil	Daily	Broadsheet	Chennai	1977	
Dina Thanthi		Tamil	Daily	Broadsheet	Tamil Nadu, Mumbai, Bangalore, Dubai, Srilanka	1908	1,530,000
Maalaimalar		Tamil	Daily	Broadsheet	Tamil Nadu	1977	
Hindu Tamil Thisai		Tamil	Daily	Broadsheet	Madras, Tamil Nadu	2013	
Tamil Murasu		Tamil	Daily		Madras, Salem, Coimbatore, Erode, Pondicherry, Madurai, Tinnevelly, Trichy, Nagercoil		
Murasoli		Tamil	Daily	Broadsheet		1942	
Namadhu Amma		Tamil	Daily	Broadsheet		2018	
Andhra Bhoomi		Telugu	Daily	Broadsheet	Hyderabad, Visakhapatnam, Vijayawada, Rajahmundry, Anantapur, Karimnagar, Nellore	1960	
Andhra Jyothi		Telugu	Daily	Broadsheet	Andhra Pradesh and Telangana	1960	664,352
Andhra Patrika		Telugu	Daily	Broadsheet	Andhra Pradesh and Telangana	1908	
Andhra Prabha		Telugu	Daily	Broadsheet	Hyderabad, Karimnagar, Nizamabad, Suryapet Vijayawada, Guntur, Rajahmundry, Visakhapatnam, Tirupati, Anantapur, Nellore	1938	
Eenadu		Telugu	Daily	Broadsheet	Andhra Pradesh and Telangana	1974	1,614,105
Mana Telangana		Telugu	Daily	Broadsheet	Telangana	2015	
Namasthe Telangana		Telugu	Daily	Broadsheet	Telangana	2011	
Nava Telangana		Telugu	Daily	Broadsheet	Telangana	2015	
Prajasakti		Telugu	Daily	Broadsheet	Andhra Pradesh	1942	
Janam Sakshi		Telugu	Daily	Broadsheet	Telangana	2002	
Sakshi		Telugu	Daily	Broadsheet	Andhra Pradesh and Telangana	2008	1,064,661
Suryaa		Telugu	Daily	Broadsheet		2007	
Vaartha		Telugu	Daily	Broadsheet		1996	
Hind Samachar		Urdu	Daily	Broadsheet	Mumbai, Ambala, Jalandhar, Jammu, Chandigarh	1948	
Munsif Daily		Urdu	Daily	Broadsheet	Hyderabad	1996	
The Musalman		Urdu	Daily	Broadsheet	Chennai	1927	
Siasat		Urdu	Daily	Broadsheet	Hyderabad	1948	
The Inquilab		Urdu	Daily	Broadsheet	Agra, Aligarh, Allahabad, Bareilly, Bhagalpur, Delhi, Gorakhpur, Kanpur, Lucknow, Meerut, Mumbai, Muzaffarpur, Patna, Varanasi	1938	

== See also ==
Other lists of Indian newspapers

- List of newspapers in India by circulation
- List of newspapers in India by readership

Language-specific lists of newspapers published in Indian languages

- List of Kannada-language newspapers
- List of Marathi-language newspapers
- List of Malayalam-language newspapers
- List of Meitei-language newspapers
- List of Punjabi-language newspapers
- List of Tamil-language newspapers
