= List of Telugu-language newspapers =

The language of Telugu is spoken in the Indian states of Andhra Pradesh and Telangana, in the southeast region of the country. The following are newspapers which are written primarily or entirely in the language.

Part of a series on

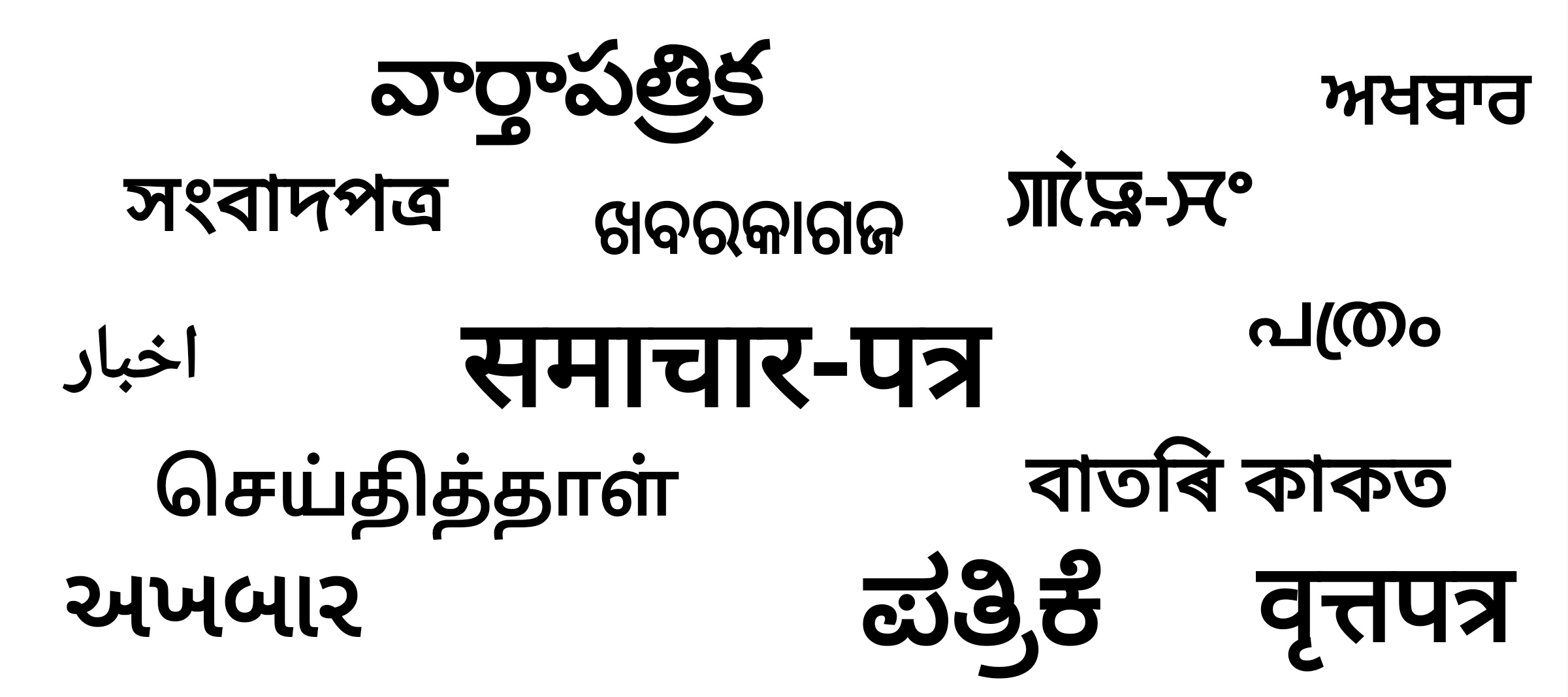

Newspapers of India
Category
Newspapers by languages
- Assamese
- Bengali
- Gujarati
- Hindi
- Kannada
- Malayalam
- Marathi
- Meitei (Manipuri)
- Punjabi
- Tamil
- Telugu
Related
- Newspapers by readership
- Registrar of Newspapers for India
- The Indian Newspaper Society

== India ==
Newspaper		Founded	Headquarters	Owner	Interval of publication	Nameplate
English	Telugu	Founded	Headquarters	Owner	Interval of publication	Nameplate
Andhra Bhoomi	ఆంధ్రభూమి	1960			Daily	
Andhra Jyothi	ఆంధ్రజ్యోతి	1960			Daily	
Andhra Prabha	ఆంధ్రప్రభ	1938			Daily	
Aadab Hyderabad	ఆదాబ్ హైదరాబాద్	2011			Daily	
Eenadu	ఈనాడు	1974	Hyderabad		Daily	
Janam Sakshi	జనంసాక్షి	2002			Daily	
Mana Telangana	మన తెలంగాణ	2015			Daily	
Namasthe Telangana	నమస్తే తెలంగాణ	2011			Daily	
Nava Telangana	నవ తెలంగాణ	2015			Daily	
Prajasakti	ప్రజాశక్తి	1942			Daily	
Sakshi	సాక్షి	2008	Hyderabad		Daily	
Suryaa	సూర్య	2007	Hyderabad		Daily	
Vaartha	వార్త	1996			Daily	
Vijaya Kranthi	విజయ క్రాంతి	2018				
Visalaandhra	విశాలాంధ్ర	1952	Vijayawada			
Zamin Ryot	జమీన్ రైతు	1930			Weekly	
Defunct
Andhra Patrika	ఆంధ్ర పత్రిక	1908			Weekly	
