= Media in Hyderabad =

Media in Hyderabad is well-developed, and the city is covered by a large network of optical fiber cables. The city's telephone system is serviced by four landline companies: BSNL, Tata Indicom, Reliance and Airtel. There are a number of mobile-phone companies: Aircel, BSNL, Airtel, Hutch Idea Cellular, Uninor, MTS, Virgin Mobile, Tata Indicom, Tata DoCoMo, and Reliance. Several companies offer broadband internet access.

== Broadcast radio ==
The city has a variety of AM and FM radio stations. Two AM broadcasting|AM and two FM broadcasting FM stations in Hyderabad are operated by All India Radio (AIR), officially known as Akashvani. The first FM radio station to broadcast in the city was AIR's Vividh Bharati in the early 1990s. In 2006, Commercial broadcasting|commercial FM radio stations were launched in Hyderabad. These stations are broadcast 24 hours a day, seven days a week with programming in Telugu language, English and Hindi.

The FM radio stations in the city are:

- Bol Radio 90.4 MHz
- Radio City 91.1 MHz
- BIG FM 92.7 92.7 MHz
- RED FM 93.5 MHz
- Fever FM 94.3 MHz Hindi Channel
- Radio Mirchi 95 MHz Hindi Channel, Known as Mirchi95.
- Radio Mirchi 98.3 FM Telugu Channel.
- AIR Rainbow 101.9 MHz
- AIR Vividh Bharati 102.8 MHz
- KOOL 104 MHz – (from the Radio Mirchi group) airs both Ryan Seacrest and Casey Kasem's AT40 – 104 FM
- IGNOU Gyan Vani 105.6 MHz (educational station, on air from 18.00 to 22.00 hours)
- Magic FM (India) 106.4 MHz
- Deccan Radio 107.8 MHz
- Radio Charminar 107.8 MHz Urdu Channel

AM radio stations in the city are:

- Hyderabad-A 737 kHz
- Hyderabad-B 1377 kHz (closed from January 2022)

== Internet radio ==
- Radio Tulip (24/7 Non-Stop Telugu live radio) website Retrieved 2017-04-01.
- Deccan Radio (24/7 South Indian internet radio) website Retrieved 2011-09-05.
- Radio Archana (24/7 devotional station: Radio Archana Sravanam Bhakthi Ki Sopanam) website
- Radio Khushi (24/7 Telugu online radio) website Retrieved 2011-09-05.
- Telangana Radio (24/7 Telugu live radio) website Retrieved 2011-09-05.
- TeluguOne Radio (24/7 Telugu live radio website Retrieved 2011-09-05.
- Tharangamedia website

== Television networks ==
The first satellite television relay in Hyderabad was started in 1974, with the launch of the state-owned Doordarshan Kendra Hyderabad, which initially telecast through ATS-6 Satellite in collaboration with NASA. It was officially inaugurated on 23 October 1977. The private satellite channels in Hyderabad were started in July 1992, with the launch of Star TV. Today there are numerous satellite TV channels available in Hyderabad. An estimated 2.5 million households use cable TV in Hyderabad.

Doordarshan transmits two terrestrial television channels and one satellite channel from Hyderabad. The Doordarshan Telugu channel, Saptagiri, was the first TV channel launched in Hyderabad in the year 1974. Many private regional television channels began broadcasting from Hyderabad in the following decades. Doordarshan Kendra Hyderabad’s Regional Network in Telugu took on a new identity of "DD Saptagiri" on 2 April 2003. After bifurcation of Andhra Pradesh state, DD Saptagiri was relegated to being telecast from Doordarshan Kendra Vijayawada for Andhra Pradesh while the existing network, renamed DD Yadagiri, was aimed at the Telangana populace. DD Yadagiri's operations have been continued from its current Ramanthapur office, Hyderabad. The channel highlights the Telangana culture and dialect. In 2018, Andhra Prabha Publication entered into broadcasting space by launching India Ahead News, which was the first national English News channel from Southern India.

Telugu television channels broadcast from Hyderabad are:

Satellite channels

- v6 news telugu
- 4TV
- 99TV
- Aalami Samay
- ABN Andhrajyothi
- APtv
- ATV
- Ap24x7 (Telugu)
- Bhakti TV
- DD Yadagiri
- ETV Telugu
- ETV Telangana
- Gemini Comedy
- Gemini Music
- Gemini News
- Gemini
- HMTV
- I News
- Jagrutitv News
- Laya News
- Maa Music
- Maa
- Maa movies
- Munsif TV
- NRI WBN
- NTV
- Prime9 News
- Sakshi
- TV 1
- Shubhavartha TV
- Studio N
- T news
- TV5
- TV9
- Zee Telugu

Cable channels

- Aap Tak TV Network – Charminar
- Azaad news TV
- CTV
- Deccan TV
- G24TV NEWS
- Metro TV
- RK NEWS
- S9TV
- TVH News Telangana

== Newspapers ==
Hyderabad has several newspapers in Telugu, English, Urdu and Hindi.

The major Telugu dailies include Eenadu, Sakshi, Maa Aksharam Mee Ayudham, Vaartha, Andhra Jyothi, Suryaa, Prajasakti, Andhra Bhoomi, Andhra Prabha, Janamsakshi, and Namaste Telangana. The major English dailies are The Times of India, The Hindu, The Deccan Chronicle, Hans India, Telangana Today, Business Standard and The Economic Times.

The major Urdu dailies are The Siasat Daily, Munsif, The Etemaad, and The Rahnuma-i Deccan, with The Daily Milap being in Hindi. Besides these major newspapers, there a number of localised neighbourhood newspapers catering to localities.

Gawah Urdu Weekly is a Hyderabad-based Urdu-language news weekly founded in 1999 by journalist Dr. Syed Fazil Hussain Parvez. It is published continuously and produces digital news content distributed via the web and social media platforms.

== Magazines ==
Hyderabad has several magazines in Telugu, English, Urdu and Hindi languages. The industry is well highlighted as a few of these Magazines host a couple of Hyderabad.

- Telugu:

Magazines published in Hyderabad include the Eenadu daily, Swati, Navya, Andhra Prabha, Andhra Jyothi, Crime Today, Vipula, Chatura, Vanita, Chandamama, and Great Andhra.

Film magazines include Tollywood, Sitara, Siva Ranjani, Santosham and Jyoti Chitra.

- English:

A National Magazine produced in Hyderabad is You & I Magazine

Local Magazines published in Hyderabad are WOW, BPOSITIVE, etc...

== Tollywood cinema ==
Hyderabad is the homeland of Tollywood, the Telugu movie industry. Apart from being a popular entertainment source and India's largest film producer as measured by the number of films made every year (followed by Bollywood), Tollywood also provides livelihood to thousands of its citizens and contributes a large amount of revenue to the local government. Previously, many Telugu films were produced in Madras. However, improvements in Hyderabad's infrastructure and initiatives such as establishing studios like Ramoji Film City (cited by the Guinness Book of World Records as the world's largest film studio), Saradhi Studios, Annapurna Studios, Ramanaidu Studios, Ramakrishna Studios and Padmalaya Studios have changed the situation. Not only Telugu films, but films from Bollywood are made in Hyderabad.
