= Hindi media =

Part of a series on

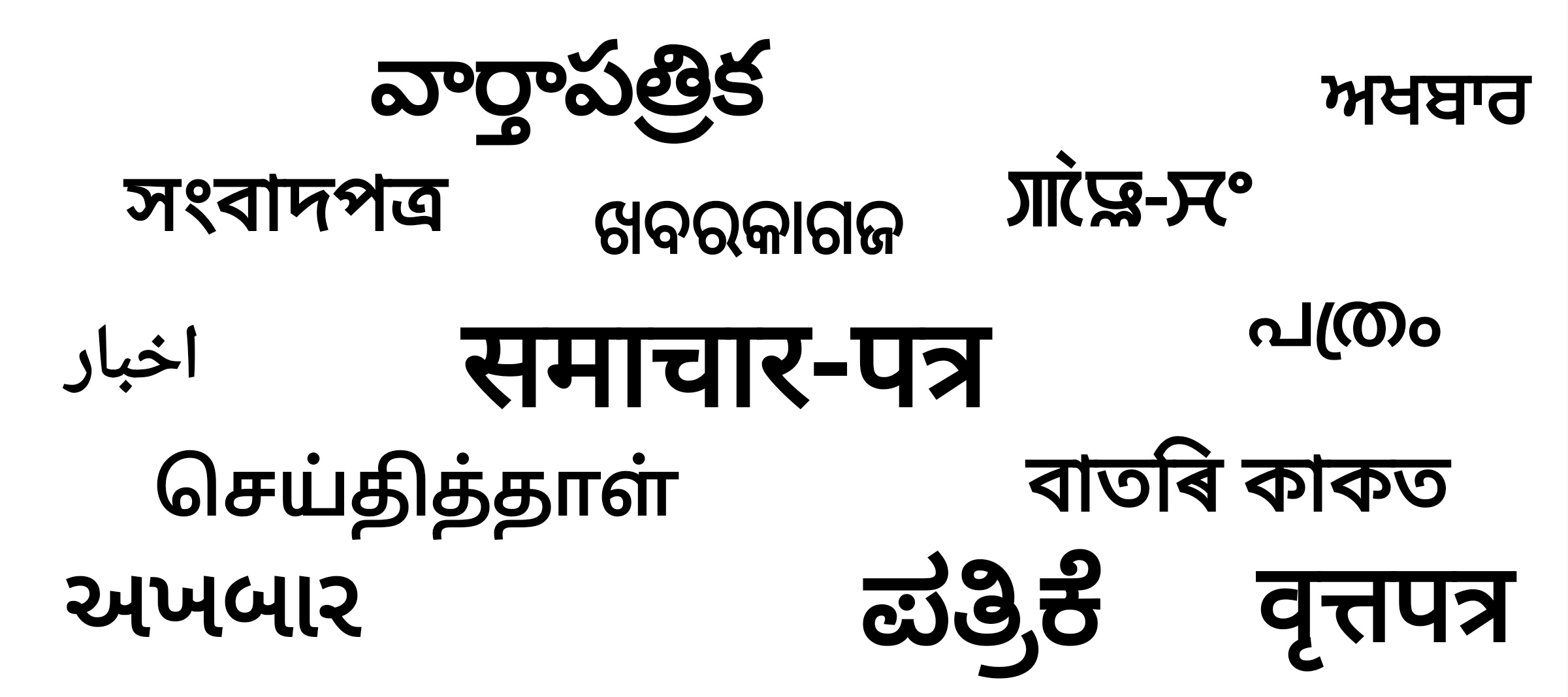

Newspapers of India
Category
Newspapers by languages
- Assamese
- Bengali
- Gujarati
- Hindi
- Kannada
- Malayalam
- Marathi
- Meitei (Manipuri)
- Punjabi
- Tamil
- Telugu
Related
- Newspapers by readership
- Registrar of Newspapers for India
- The Indian Newspaper Society

Hindi media refers to media in the Hindi language and its dialects, across the Hindi belt in India and elsewhere within the Hindi-speaking Indian diaspora.

Hindi media has a 200-year history, with the 1826 publication of the first newspaper in the language, Udant Martand.

== Newspapers ==
India has a long history of printing, from the setting up of the country's first printing press in 1674 in Bombay (present-day Mumbai). The Calcutta General Advertiser, India's first newspaper (also known as Hickey's Bengal Gazette), started in 1780.

The Hindi belt of multilingual India is a group of predominantly Hindi-speaking states commonly understood to include the states of Haryana, Himachal Pradesh, Rajasthan, Uttar Pradesh, Uttarakhand, Bihar, Jharkhand, Madhya Pradesh, Chhattisgarh, and the union territories of Delhi and Chandigarh. Hindi news media have had a dominant presence in a large part of the country. However, before 1826, there were many newspapers throughout modern-day India, Pakistan, and Bangladesh (the British Raj) but only in English, Persian, and Bangla, none in Hindi.

Hindi Journalism Day, held on 30 May, is considered an extremely important day for Hindi journalism, because the first Hindi-language newspaper, Udant Martand (The Rising Sun), was first published on this day in 1826 by Pandit Jugal Kishore Shukla as a weekly newspaper from Calcutta (modern-day Kolkata) in what was then the state of Bengal but since that year was divided into the Indian state of West Bengal and the country of Bangladesh. The newspaper came out on Tuesdays, with Pandit Shukla serving as both publisher and editor.

Originally from Kanpur, and a lawyer, Pandit Shukla took on this task because he wanted to give more importance to journalism. As India was under colonial British rule at that time, it became a major challenge to talk about the rights of Indians in the country, which accounts for why the focus of India's first Hindi-language newspaper's on talking about the rights of native Indians is usually described as a bold experiment.

Due to lack of knowledge of the Hindi language, especially in states like Bengal, there were rarely any returning readers, however. The cost of sending Udant Martand out to Hindi-belt states was quite high, and all of Pandit Shukla's requests to the colonial British government asking for a concession in postal rates were denied. The newspaper was forced to close in less than two years due to unforeseen financial constraints. But for his part in starting India's first Hindi-language newspaper, Pandit Shukla is commemorated as an important figure in Hindi journalism.

Several decades later, the first daily Hindi-language newspaper, Samachar Sudha Varshan (Shower of Nectar), started in 1854, three years before the Indian Rebellion of 1857.

== Hindi media today ==
Currently, India publishes about 1,000 Hindi daily newspapers with a combined circulation of about 80 million copies. English, the second largest language in terms of number of daily newspapers, has about 250 daily newspapers with a circulation of about 40 million copies. Prominent Hindi newspapers include Prabhat Khabar (The Morning News); Dainik Jagran (The Daily Awakening); Dainik Bhaskar (The Daily Sun); Amar Ujala (The Immortal Brightness); Navbharat Times (New India Times); Hindustan Dainik (The Daily Hindustan); and Rajasthan Patrika (The Rajasthan Newsletter).

In terms of readership, Dainik Jagran is the most popular Hindi daily, with a total readership (TR) of 54,583,000, according to IRS Round One 2009. Dainik Bhaskar is the second most popular, with a total readership of 33,500,000. Amar Ujala, with a TR of 28,674,000; Hindustan Dainik, with a TR of 26,769,000; and Rajasthan Patrika, with a TR of 14,051,000, are placed at the next three positions of popularity. The total readership of the top 10 Hindi dailies is estimated at 188.68 million, nearly five times the top 10 English dailies, which have 38.76 million combined total readership. Other Hindi dailies target online readership on YouTube and other social media.

Prabhat Khabar, founded in August 1984 in Ranchi and circulated in several Indian states including Jharkhand, Bihar, and West Bengal, as well as some parts of Odisha, is notable for reporting social issues and revealing scams, such as the Fodder Scam, on which it began reporting in 1992. Despite threats, the newspaper published 70 reports on this scam, covered by four or five reporters.

== Hindi news channels and websites ==
Prominent Hindi television news channels include India TV, News18 India, ABP News, Zee News, Aaj Tak, NDTV India, News 24 Online, and News World India.

The most popular Hindi news websites are primarily the online versions of the Hindi newspapers and news channels.
