= Karavali Ale =

Indian Kannada-language newspaper

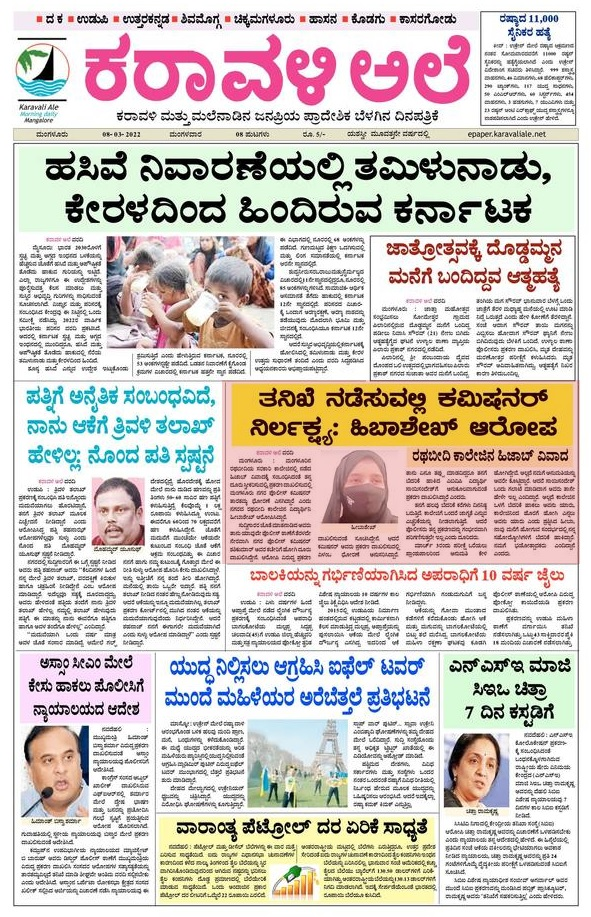
- Front page of the Mangalore edition of Karavali Ale, dated March 9, 2022.
- Type: Daily newspaper
- Format: Broadsheet
- Owner(s): B. V. Seetaram, Rohini S.
- Publisher: Chitra Publications Pvt. Ltd.
- Editor-in-chief: B. V. Seetaram
- Founded: 2 December 1992; 33 years ago
- Language: Kannada
- Headquarters: Mangalore, Karnataka
- Circulation: Dakshina Kannada, Udupi, Kasaragod
- Website: karavaliale.net]]

Karavali Ale (Kannada: ಕರಾವಳಿ ಅಲೆ), meaning "Coastal Waves" in Kannada, is a local Kannada daily newspaper published in Mangalore, Karnataka, India. The publication is owned and managed by its founders B. V. Seetaram and Rohini S. It is edited by Sathish N. Vaidya.

Since its establishment, Karavali Ale has been among the front-running print publications in Dakshina Kannada and Udupi districts. As per DAVP 2013, it has a circulation of over 45,000 in these regions, making it one of the popular Kannada newspapers in Coastal Karnataka. The newspaper primarily focuses on local and state-level coverage, but provides a regular mix of national and international current affairs news as well. As a result of the publication's persistent political commentaries against right-wing politics, its employees have been attacked multiple times by extremists across the Kanara region, and the sale of the newspaper has been disrupted occasionally in attempts to interrupt the circulation network. Karavali Ale headquarters was also attacked by miscreants, which was condemned by the Indian Newspaper Society and the Press Council of India.

Karavali Ale was established in 1992 under the parent company Chitra Publications Pvt. Ltd. The company has published three more newspapers since its inception.

== Sister publications ==
- Kannada Janantaranga is a local Kannada daily newspaper founded on 18 September 1993. It is published in Kumta, and predominant in Uttara Kannada and Malenadu regions of Karnataka. The e-paper of Kannada Janantaranga is available online and uploaded daily. Ramesh S. Poojary is the editor of Kannada Janataranga currently.
- The Canara Times, founded on 7 June 1989, was the first local English daily in Dakshina Kannada. It was discontinued at the turn of the millennium after a long stint as a periodical print publication. It now runs as an online news portal disseminating articles on local, national, and international current affairs.
- Sanje Ale was a local Kannada eveninger published in Mangalore. It was in circulation for three years before being discontinued in 2009.

== Editor-in-chief ==
B. V. Seetaram, popularly referred to by the acronym BVSee, is the editor-in-chief of Karavali Ale. Prior to starting his own journalistic venture, Seetaram has worked at Samyukta Karnataka, The Indian Express, and The Hindu. He is acknowledged for his radical and unreserved take on various socio-political topics. Spearheaded by Seetaram, the editorial team of Karavali Ale has raked up several significant issues and has been hailed for pro-people journalism.

On a number of occasions, Seetaram has been involved in controversies with local as well as national right-wing political parties and groups of Karnataka for his bold remarks on their policies. He was arrested along with his wife Rohini on charges of defamation and disturbing communal harmony. This led to widespread protests by the civil society and journalists' fraternity, including the Editors' Guild of India. Human rights organisations like People's Union for Civil Liberties and National Human Rights Commission of India condemned the allegations and the consequent arrests. Subsequently, The Karnataka High Court found the arrests illegal, and cited it as a human rights breach as well as a violation of the freedom of the press. Karnataka Home Department officials were slapped a fine and compensation in this regard.

== Karavali Ale news website ==
The Karavali Ale web site was launched on 1 December 2016. The web portal dispenses regular updates of local and state-level news.

== Awards ==
- In 2010, the Dakshina Kannada District Child Welfare Committee awarded Karavali Ale the CWC award being the 'Best Newspaper Creating Awareness on Child Rights. Nina Nayak, chairperson of the Karnataka State Commission for Protection of Child Rights, presented the award.
- Transparency International India awarded Seetaram the 'Journalist of the Year' award for 'courage and fortitude in his writings and during his incarceration in 2008-2009'. The award was presented by Chairman Justice M. F. Saldanha.

== See also ==
- List of Kannada-language newspapers
- List of Kannada-language magazines
- List of newspapers in India
- Media in Karnataka
- Media of India
