= List of Tamil-language newspapers =

Part of a series on

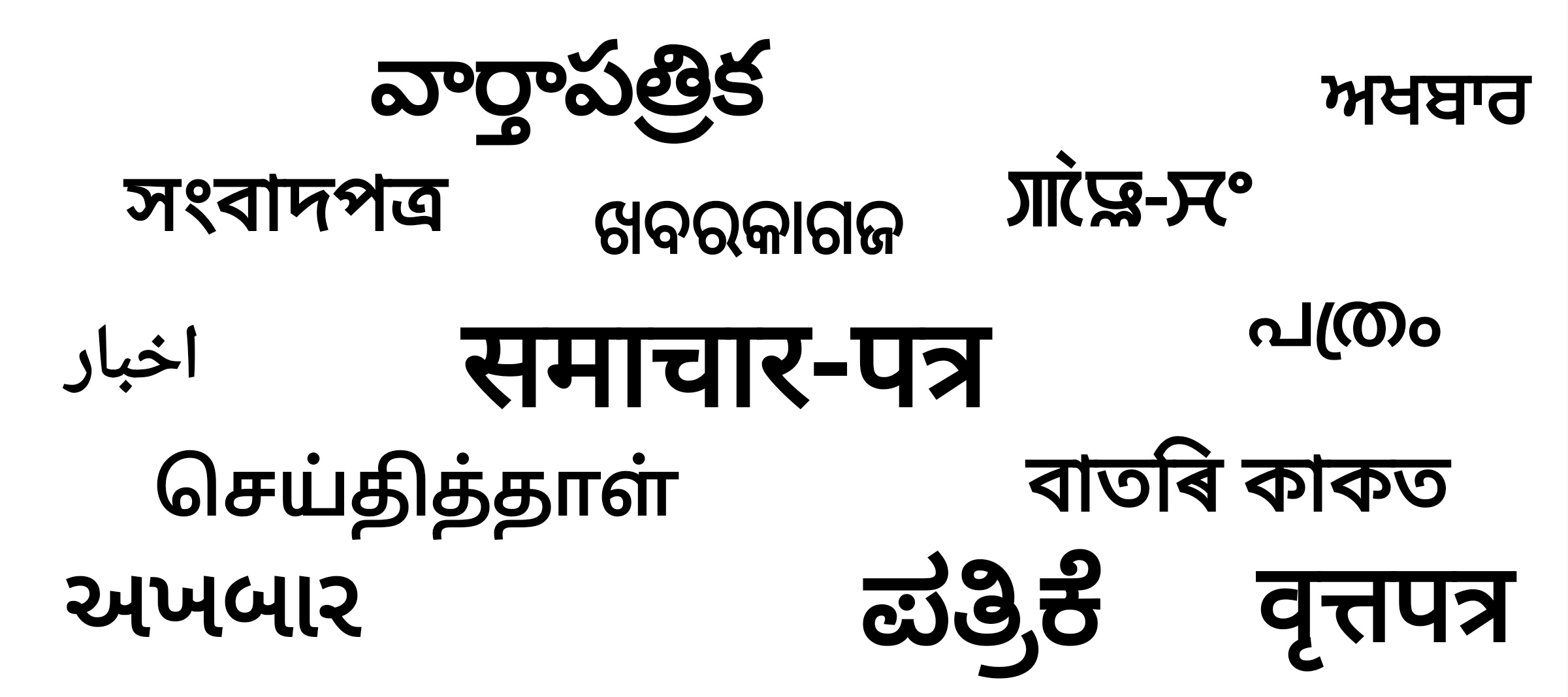

Newspapers of India
Category
Newspapers by languages
- Assamese
- Bengali
- Gujarati
- Hindi
- Kannada
- Malayalam
- Marathi
- Meitei (Manipuri)
- Punjabi
- Tamil
- Telugu
Related
- Newspapers by readership
- Registrar of Newspapers for India
- The Indian Newspaper Society

== India ==
- Dina Thanthi (தினத்தந்தி)
- Dinakaran (தினகரன்)
- Murasoli (முரசொலி)
- Namadhu Amma (நமது அம்மா)
- Dinamalar (தினமலர்)
- Dinamani (தினமணி) (Tamil Branch of The New Indian Express)
- Dinasudar (தினச்சுடர்)
- Theekkathir (தீக்கதிர்)
- Janasakthi (ஜனசக்தி)
- Hindu Tamil Thisai (இந்து தமிழ் திசை) (Tamil Branch of The Hindu)
- Viduthalai (விடுதலை)

=== Evening newspapers ===
- Maalai Malar ( மாலை மலர் )
- Malai Murasu ( மாலை முரசு )
- Tamil Murasu (தமிழ் முரசு) (India) - Evening Daily
- Nellai Maalai Murasu (நெல்லை மாலை முரசு)

== Sri Lanka ==
- Virakesari (வீரகேசரி)
- Thinakaran
- Thinakkural
- Uthayan
- Sudar Oli
- Tamil Mirror
- IBC Tamil

== Malaysia ==
- Makkal Osai (மக்கள் ஓசை)
- Malaysia Nanban (மலேசியா நண்பன்)
- Tamil Nesan (தமிழ் நேசன்)

== Singapore ==
- Tamil Murasu (தமிழ் முரசு)
