= Parichay =

Parichay (lit. 'introduction') may refer to:

- Parichay (film), a 1972 Indian Hindi-language film
- Parichay (2000 film), a 2000 Indian film starring Sonali Chowdhury
- Porichoi, a 2013 Indian Bengali-language drama film
- Parichay (singer), an Indo-Canadian singer
- "Parichay" (song), a 2019 song by Amit Bhadana
- Parichay (TV series), a 2011–13 Indian television series
- Parichay Das, an Indian writer
- Parichay Times, a Hindi-language daily newspaper in India

== See also ==
- Parichaya, a 2009 Indian film
- Parichah, a village in Iran
- Parichha, a city in Uttar Pradesh, India
