= Bengali-language newspapers =

Robert Knight papers promoted Indian self-rule and often criticized the policies of the British Raj. ''Bengal Gazetti'' was the first Bengali newspaper published in India in May 1818, and Ganga Kishore Bhattacharya edited it.

== Bangladesh ==
Newspaper name		Founded	Owner/Publisher	Editor	Region	Circulation (June, 2018)
English	Bengali	Founded	Owner/Publisher	Editor	Region	Circulation (June, 2018)
Bangladesh Pratidin	বাংলাদেশ প্রতিদিন	16 March 2010	East West Media Group	Naem Nizam	National	553,300
Prothom Alo	দৈনিক প্রথম আলো	4 November 1998	Media Star Limited	Matiur Rahman	National	501,800
Kaler Kantho	কালের কন্ঠ	10 January 2010	East West Media Group	Imdadul Haq Milan	National	290,200
The Daily Jugantor	দৈনিক যুগান্তর	1 February 1999	Salma Islam	Saiful Alam	National	290,200
The Daily Ittefaq	দৈনিক ইত্তেফাক	24 December 1953	Ittefaq Group of Publications Ltd.	Tasmima Hossain	National	290,200
The Daily Janakantha	দৈনিক জনকণ্ঠ	29 February 1993	Mohammad Atikullah Khan Masud	Mohammad Atikullah Khan Masud	National	275,000
Samakal	দৈনিক সমকাল	31 May 2005	AK Azad	Mustafiz Shafi	National	270,000
Amader Shomoy	দৈনিক আমাদের সময়	2003	New Vision Limited	National	270,000	
Bhorer Kagoj	ভোরের কাগজ	15 February 1992	Saber Hossain Chowdhury	Shyamal Dutta	National	161,160
Daily Manab Zamin	দৈনিক মানবজমিন	15 February 1997	Mahbuba Chowdhury	Matiur Rahman Chowdhury	National	161,100
Alokito Bangladesh	আলোকিত বাংলাদেশ	2013	Alokito Media Ltd.	Kazi Rafiqul Alam	National	152,000
The Sangbad	দৈনিক সংবাদ	17 May 1951	Alatamasa Kabir	Khandakar Muniruzzaman	National	127,000
The Daily Inqilab	দৈনিক ইনকিলাব	4 June 1986	Inqilab Enterprise & Publications Limited	A.M.M. Bahauddin	National	125,460
Jaijaidin	যায়যায়দিন	1999	Jaijaidin Publication Limited	Sayeed Hossain Chowdhury	National	116,000
Daily Naya Diganta	দৈনিক নয়াদিগন্ত	25 October 2004	Diganta Media Corporation	Alamgir Mahiuddin	National	90,650
The Azadi	দৈনিক আজাদী	5 September 1960	MA Malek	MA Malek	National (published from Chattogram)	56,000
Daily Sangram	দৈনিক সংগ্রাম	17 January 1970	Bangladesh Publications Ltd.	Abul Asad	National	32,020

== India ==
Part of a series on

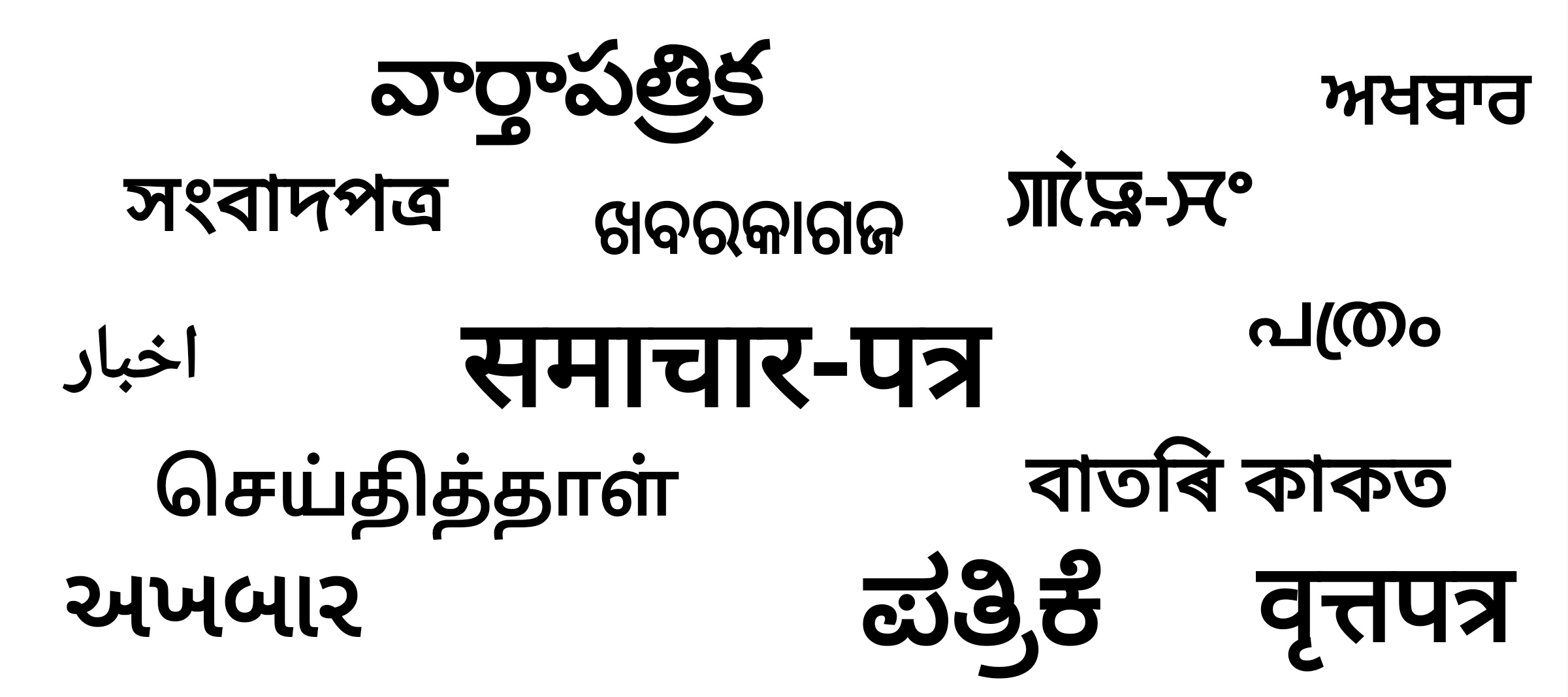

Newspapers of India
Category
Newspapers by languages
- Assamese
- Bengali
- Gujarati
- Hindi
- Kannada
- Malayalam
- Marathi
- Meitei (Manipuri)
- Punjabi
- Tamil
- Telugu
Related
- Newspapers by readership
- Registrar of Newspapers for India
- The Indian Newspaper Society

Newspaper name		Founded	Owner/Publisher	Editor	Region	Circulation
English	Bengali	Founded	Owner/Publisher	Editor	Region	Circulation
Aajkaal	আজকাল	1981	AJkal Publishers Ltd.	Ashoke Dasgupta	Regional	708,976 daily
Anandabazar Patrika	আনন্দবাজার পত্রিকা	1922	ABP Group	Ishani Dutta Roy	Regional	1,046,607 daily
Bartaman	বর্তমান	1984	Bartaman Ltd.	Himanshu Sinha	Regional	622,907 Daily
Dainik Sambad	দৈনিক সংবাদ	1971	Bhupendra Chandra Datta Bhowmik Trust		Regional	
Dainik Statesman	দৈনিক স্টেটসম্যান	2004	The Statesman Group		Regional	
Ebela	এবেলা	2012	ABP Group	Anirban Chattopadhyay	Regional	
Ei Samay	এই সময়	October 15, 2012	The Times Group	Rupayan Bhattacharya	Regional	338,422 daily
Ekdin	একদিন	2006	Narshingha Broadcasting Pvt. Ltd.	Arjun Singh	Regional	
Ganashakti	গণশক্তি	1967	Ganashakti Trust	Debashish Chakraborty	Regional	
Jago Bangla	জাগো বাংলা	2015	All India Trinamool Congress	Partha Chatterjee	Regional	
Kalantar	কালান্তর	1965	CPI West Bengal Council		Regional	
Puber Kalom	পুবের কলম	2011	Kalom Welfare Association	Ahmed Hassan Imran	Regional	
Sangbad Pratidin	সংবাদ প্রতিদিন	1992	Swapan Sadhan Bose	Srinjoy Bose	Regional	266,665 daily
Uttarbanga Sambad	উত্তরবঙ্গ সংবাদ	May 19, 1980	Sabyasachi Talukdar		Regional	160,517 daily
Najarbandi	নজরবন্দি	April 16, 2016	Genius Creative Media	Arka Sana	Regional	1591482 daily
Indiahood	ইন্ডিয়াহুড	Feb 05, 2022	Hoodgen Private Limited	Koushik Dutta	Regional	253634 daily
bongdunia	বঙ্গদুনিয়া	March 30, 2019	Geeky web Private Limited	Nitya Jana	Regional	543556 daily

== Pakistan ==
Daily Qaumi Bandhan (Bengali: দৈনিক কওমি বন্ধন; lit. "national unity") was a Bengali language newspaper published in Karachi, Sindh, Pakistan. It has the reputation of being the only main Bengali newspaper in the country that catered specifically to the large Bengali community in Pakistan. Founded in the 1940s, the newspaper was discontinued decades later due to financial reasons. It was based in the Chittagong Colony, a Bengali neighbourhood in Karachi.

== United States ==
Akhon Samoy (Bengali: এখন সময়) is a Bengali-language newspaper published from New York, United States since 2000.

== United Kingdom ==
Janomot was founded in London and established on 21 February 1969. It is the first Bengali newsweekly published outside Bangladesh.

Potrika was established in 1997. It is published every Monday for £0.50 (or for annual subscription of £82.16). It is the only broadsheet Bengali newspaper published from the UK and follows issues relating to the British Bangladeshi community, reflecting their concerns and interests.

The newspaper covers news concerning the British Bangladeshi community from the UK, Bangladesh and worldwide, including coverage of business news, sports, films, health, leisure, fashion, education and environment.
