= Vishweshwar Bhat =

Indian journalist

- Born: 22 July 1966 (age 60); Murur, Kumta, Uttara Kannada, Karnataka, India

Vishweshwar Bhat (born 22 July 1966) is an Indian journalist in Karnataka and the author of 119 books in Kannada language. Currently he is the editor-in-chief of Vishwavani TV, daily and Pravasi Prapancha bi-weekly. Earlier he was the editor of Vijaya Karnataka and Kannada Prabha newspapers and the television channel Suvarna News. He started a media house in Karnataka by name Vishwakshara Media Pvt. Ltd. as Managing Director with Sri K. P. Nanjundi. He is the editor-in-chief of the Kannada daily Vishwavani, which was relaunched on 15 January 2016 all over Karnataka, prior to which it was being published and circulated only in Hubballi, headed by renowned Kannada writer Patil Puttappa. Vishweshwar Bhat is a recipient of the Zee Kannada Hemmeya Kannadiga Awards to felicitate achievers in their respective fields. He was also the recipient of the Rajyotsava Awards conferred by the Government of Karnataka for his achievements as a journalist in 2005.

Vishweshwar Bhat hails from Murur, Kumta taluk, Uttara Kannada district of Karnataka. He completed his primary schooling in Tudaguni and secondary schooling in Goli. A recipient of 4 Gold medals over the course of his postgraduation in geology and MA in journalism, he had a brief stint working as an assistant professor at Asian College of Journalism and also as an officer on special duty to late Ananth Kumar, minister of tourism and culture during the Vajpayee government.

In early 2011, Bhat became the editor-in-chief of the newspaper Kannada Prabha, where he had previously served for four years as a sub-editor. Bhat had resigned from VK at the end of 2010, stating he intended to pursue higher studies, and had started a blog.

He has written 94 books in Kannada. Over the past 25 years, he has been regularly writing two columns a week and other articles for Kannada newspapers. Among his famous columns are: Janagala Mana, Noorentu Nota, Noorentu Vishwa, Noorentu Maatu, Daarideepokti, Vakratundokti, Ide Antaranga Suddi, Sampadakara Sabhyashodhane, and Ask the Editor. His witty answers to the questions of the readers through his popular daily column, Bhattar-Scotch, are well received by Kannadigas. He has also written various columns under the pen names Swami Anamadeya Poorna, Suddeesha, Bana Bhatta, Gunda Bhatta, etc., to name a few.

Recently, one of his articles was adopted for the Kannada movie Tanuja, directed by Harish M. D. Halli, in which he also acted as an editor.

His hobbies include photography and cricket.

Vishweshwar Bhat also leads a team that has successfully completed more than 500 sessions in Clubhouse under a group named ‘Vishwavani Club’ focusing on topics from different fields.

The tech-savvy editor is also very active on social media, like Twitter, Facebook and Instagram.

In August 2012, Bhat was allegedly one of the journalists who was being targeted by terror suspects.
