= Telakapalli Ravi =

Indian Telugu journalist, political analyst and writer

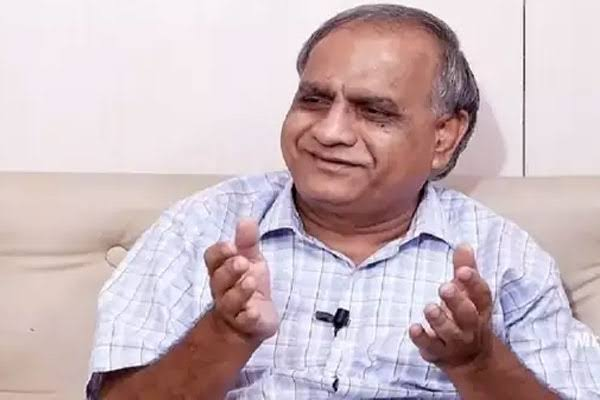
- Born: 1956 (age 69–70); Andhra Pradesh, India
- Occupations: Journalist, political analyst, writer
- Notable work: Gamanam
- Title: Editor, Prajasakti
- Parents: Telakapalli Narasimhaiah (father); T.C. Lakshmamma (mother)

Telakapalli Ravi (born 1956) is an Indian Telugu journalist, political analyst and writer. He formerly served as editor of Prajasakti, a Telugu daily newspaper. He is known for his commentary on Andhra Pradesh politics, and for hosting political talk shows.

== Early life and background ==
Telakapalli Ravi was born in Andhra Pradesh to T.C. Lakshmamma, a distinguished leader in the women's movement and a senior communist, and Telakapalli Narasimhaiah, both ardent proponents of leftist ideology. Growing up in an environment shaped by activism and literature, Ravi’s formative years were influenced by his parents’ commitment to progressive values, which became the foundation for his lifelong engagement with left-wing thought and literary pursuits.

== Career ==
Ravi became active as a journalist and columnist in Telugu media. He held the position of editor at Prajasakti. He regularly provides political analysis and appears on television discussions about state and national politics in Andhra Pradesh. He hosts a talk show, Straight Talk with Telakapalli. He is president of Sahiti Sravanti, a literary organization in Telugu.

== Literary works ==
Telakapalli Ravi has written and translated numerous works in Telugu, spanning criticism, social commentary, memoirs, and literary reviews. Some of his works include:

1. Mana Cinemalu (tr. "Our Movies")
2. Amaravati Aduguletu (tr. "Which Direction Amaravati Moves") - This book attracted criticism for Ravi for making comments on Amaravati, current capital of Andhra Pradesh.
3. Amma (tr. "Mother") - Telugu translation of Maxim Gorky's Mother

== Awards and recognition ==
He received the Telugu University Award for journalism in 2015. In 2021, he was selected by the Andhra Pradesh government for the YSR Life Time Achievement Award, which carries a financial component, but he declined the award.

== Views and controversies ==
Ravi has made public statements about political developments. His views on Telangana movement, particularly million march and demolition of statues from Andhra Pradesh was highly criticized. For example, he has critiqued levels of political abuse in Andhra Pradesh. In discussions of local political dynamics such as election boycotts or policy decisions he has offered analysis that has been reported in the media.

He has been criticized and called out for being a critic of Andhra Pradesh Politics. Ravi's criticism of political developments, including the Amaravati capital issue, has occasionally drawn controversy. He has faced accusations from a section of critics of bias and financial links to political parties, all of which he has denied in various debates and forums.
