= Big TV Telugu =

Indian Telugu-language news television channel

- Country: India
- Headquarters: Hyderabad, Telengana, India

Programming
- Language: Telugu

Ownership
- Owner: Big TV News Network
- Key people: Anil Ayroor (managing director); S. Vijaykumar (executive editor); Ashok Vemulapalli (Chief editor); Ganesh Yerakal (Deputy Chief editor), Rohit Muthyala, Rajesh Vemula, Ramadevi Maryada (Associate editor), Sheik Sartaj (Coordinating Editor), Rupa Indukuri (Chief Operating Officer)
- Sister channels: Big TV 24x7 Malayalam

History
- Launched: 14 June 2023; 3 years ago
- Founder: Vennam Vijay Reddy

Links
- Website: bigtvlive.com

Availability

Streaming media
- YouTube: (Worldwide)

Big TV Telugu is a Telugu language 24x7 news channel owned by Big TV News Network. It was launched on 14 June 2023 and later relaunched on 26 July 2026 with new logo and AR, VR, XR and AI news presentations as the channel mainly airs news programming.

== History ==
Big TV was launched on 14 June 2023 by Vennam Vijay Reddy, the younger brother of Telangana Pradesh Congress Committee General secretary, Vennam Srikanth Reddy. The channel is said to be having Congress-backed support during its launch. In July 2023, the channel introduces Maya, the first AI-powered news anchor designed to deliver daily news updates in Telugu speaking states after Aaj Tak and OTV introduces AI news readers for the first time.

But In 2026, after gaining response from Telugu speaking market, Big TV Network decided to expand their news channel in other states in which they firstly launched Big TV 24x7 Malayalam in Kerala. The network later brings Anil Ayroor, who served in many Malayalam television channels and also behind of bringing AR, VR and XR news presentations in leading Malayalam news channels (like 24 News and Reporter TV) appoints as a managing director of Big TV Network.

While in July 2026, the network later revamped Big TV with new logo similar to the network's own Malayalam channel and with AR/VR/XR news studio.

== Owned channels ==
Channel	Launched	Language	Category
Big TV Telugu	2023	Telugu	News
Big TV 24x7 Malayalam	2026	Malayalam	News
Big TV Tamil	TBA	Tamil	News
Big TV Kannada	TBA	Kannada	News

== News Editors ==
- Ganesh Yerakal
- Rohit Muthyala
- Rajesh Vemula
- Ramadevi Maryada
- Sheik Sartaj
- Rupa Indukuri

== Controversy ==
Ashok Vemulapalli, who is the chief editor of Big TV Network lefts the channel due to some reasons triggering the network while some observers alleges his departure had being linked to Big TV’s coverage of Andhra Pradesh DSC recruitment scam, which reportedly put IT Minister Nara Lokesh in an uncomfortable position and Big TV's sympathetic political side towards on Congress and whether both Revanth Reddy and Nara Lokesh's personal releationship is behind on Ashok's exit. But Ashok denied those allegations and claims he had lefts the channel due to personal issues and there is no controversy behind on the channel and on the scam.

== See also ==
- List of Telugu-language television channels
- Television in India
- Media in Hyderabad
- Media of India
