= Hosa Digantha =

Indian newspaper

- Type: Daily newspaper
- Format: Broadsheet
- Publisher: Jnana Bharathi Prakashana
- Editor: Vinayak Bhat Muroor
- Founded: 1979
- Political alignment: right front
- Language: Kannada
- Headquarters: Bengalooru, Mangalore, Shimoga, Hubli
- Price: 3.00 Rs
- Website: www.hosadigantha.com

Hosa Digantha (Kannada: ಹೊಸ ದಿಗಂತ; lit. 'New horizon') is a Kannada morning daily in Karnataka.

With its tagline Rāshtra Jāgrutiya Dainika (Kannada: ರಾಷ್ಚ್ರ ಜಾಗೃತಿಯ ದೈನಿಕ; lit. 'Daily for national awareness'), Hosa Digantha is a newspaper with nationalist ideology. Vinayak Bhat Muroor is the Editor-in-Chief of Hosa Digantha which also features young reporter Chiru Bhat who was earlier with Samaya TV and Vishwavani News. Another well-known columnist and author Rohith Chakrathirtha also writes to the newspaper.

Started in the year 1979, from Mangaluru, now has Mangaluru, Bengaluru, Shivamogga and Hubli editions. The Hubli edition was launched on 27 March 2011, by the Chief Minister of Karnataka Mr. Yeddyurappa.

== See also ==
- List of Kannada-language newspapers
- List of Kannada-language magazines
- List of newspapers in India
- Media in Karnataka
- Media of India
