= Ravivasriya Hindustan =

Indian weekly newspaper

Ravivasriya Hindustan is an Indian weekly newspaper which is the highest circulated weekly newspaper in India. It is owned by Hindustan Media Ventures. It publishes from Patna, Delhi, Lucknow, Muzaffarpur, Bhagalpur, Kanpur, Meerut, Varanasi, Ranchi, Agra, Dhanbad and Moradabad.
