= Star of Mysore =

Newspaper published in Mysore, India

- Type: Daily newspaper
- Founder: K B Ganapathy
- Publisher: K B Ganapathy
- Editor: K B Ganapathy
- Founded: 1978
- Language: English
- Headquarters: Mysore
- Country: India
- Circulation: Daily evening
- Website: www.starofmysore.com
- Free online archives: epaper.starofmysore.com

Star of Mysore is an Indian English language evening daily newspaper published in Mysore, India. This newspaper was launched in 1978. Its founder, editor and publisher was entrepreneur and writer K B Ganapathy.

== Controversy ==
On April 6, 2020, an article titled "Bad apples in the basket" written by the editors K B Ganapathy and M Govinde Gowda was published. The article read "The presence of bad apples cannot be wished away. They are there in whatever way one wants to identify them, doesn't matter if it is religious, political or social, taking care not to generalise. An ideal solution to the problem created by bad apples is to get rid of them, as the former leader of Singapore did a few decades ago or as the leadership in Israel is currently doing."

It was interpreted that the editors are referring to the people of the Muslim community and calling for a genocide. The article was widely opposed and provoked outrage. The editorial issued an apology stating that the article was mainly focused on the spread of COVID-19.

== See also ==
- Mysooru Mithra
- List of Kannada-language newspapers
- List of Kannada-language magazines
- List of newspapers in India
- Media in Karnataka
- Media of India
