= Lion Express =

Indian News Paper

Lion Express (Hindi: लॉयन एक्सप्रेस) is an Indian newspaper.

Biraj Mohan (Ramawat), the founder of Lion Express, was born in a very simple farmer's family in a small village Basi-Barsinghsar of Bikaner district. Instead of giving up on the circumstances, he chose the path of hard work with courage and dedication. The word IMPOSSIBLE is not even in Biraj Mohan's dictionary. Once he sees a dream, then he believes it only after realizing it. Lion Express is the successful culmination of his passion. Today Lion Express is one of the best and most successful portals in Western Rajasthan. Always ready to help the needy people, Biraj Mohan (Ramawat) himself is a very good speaker, writer and journalist and is known for his simplicity and ease.

== History ==
The Newspaper was launched in 2011 in Rajasthan, India.

Go to Lion Express in one click .

More than 5 lakh followers on Facebook

It was founded by Biraj Mohan (बृजमोहन रामावत) , in 2011 and published as Lion Express in Bikaner Rajasthan.

== See also ==
- List of newspapers in India
