= Suddi Sangaati =

Indian newspaper

Suddi Sangaati was a Kannada language weekly newspaper published from Karnataka, India. It was founded by Indudhara Honnapura, in 1985. As of 1987, it had a circulation of 44,000.

== See also ==
- List of Kannada-language newspapers
- List of Kannada-language magazines
- List of newspapers in India
- Media in Karnataka
- Media of India
