= Nava Telangana =

Indian newspaper

- Type: Daily newspaper
- Format: Broadsheet
- Owner: Communist Party of India (Marxist)
- Editor: Rampally Ramesh
- Founded: 21 March 2015
- Political alignment: Left
- Language: Telugu
- Headquarters: Hyderabad, Telangana
- Website: http://navatelangana.com/

Nava Telangana (lit. 'New Telangana') is a daily Telugu language newspaper in the Indian state of Telangana owned by the Communist Party of India (Marxist) (CPI(M)). It is published in Karimnagar, Khammam, Hyderabad, and Ranga Reddy.

The party launched the newspaper on 21 March 2015 as a counterpart to their Andhra Pradesh-based newspaper Prajasakti after the formation of Telangana the year prior. A ceremony was held t mark the launch with various political figures from "all political parties" in attendance. The paper recorded a drop of 67% in government advertising fees from the Telangana state government, a major source of newspaper funds, from 2016 to 2018.

== See also ==
- List of newspapers in India
- List of newspapers in India by circulation
- List of newspapers in the world by circulation
