= Abhay Chhajlani =

Indian journalist (1934–2023)

- अभय छजलानी
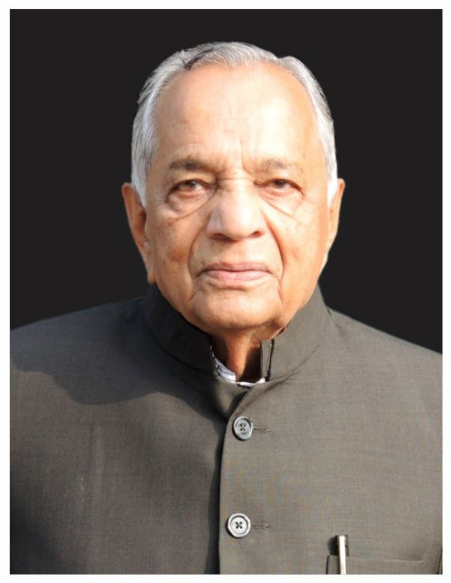
- Born: 4 August 1934; Indore, Indore State, British India
- Died: 23 March 2023 (aged 88); Indore, Madhya Pradesh, India
- Resting place: Indore, Madhya Pradesh, India
- Education: Degree in journalism, Thomson Foundation Cardiff, 1965
- Occupation: Journalist
- Title: Chief Editor of Nai Dunia
- Spouse: Pushpadevi
- Children: 3
- Awards: Padma Shri, Shrikant Verma Award

Abhay Chhajlani (4 August 1934 – 23 March 2023) was an Indian journalist and the chief editor of the Indore-based daily, Nai Dunia. He was the president of the Indian Newspaper Society, a post to which he was elected in 2002. He also served the society as a member of its executive committee. He was associated with Blood Donation 365 Days, an initiative promoting blood donation. He was the chairman of Abhay Prashal, a social facility in Indore and participated in several social forums. The government of India awarded him the fourth-highest civilian honour of the Padma Shri, in 2009, for his contributions to journalism.

Abhay Chhajlani belonged to the founding family of Naidunia and was chairman of the Indore Table Tennis Trust in 1994. He was also a member of the Indian Languages Newspaper Association and served as president of the member executive committee.

Chhajlani died on 23 March 2023, at the age of 88.

== Awards and recognition ==
- 2009: awarded the fourth-highest civilian honor of the Padma Shri in 2009
