= Usha Kirana =

Indian newspaper

- Part of 6 June 2006 edition's page
- Type: Daily newspaper
- Format: Broadsheet
- Owner(s): Bennett, Coleman & Co. Ltd.
- Founded: March 2005
- Language: Kannada
- Headquarters: Bangalore, Karnataka
- Circulation: 75,000 (2006)

Usha Kirana was an Indian Kannada language newspaper which had its headquarters in Bangalore, Karnataka.

It was established by Vijay Sankeshwar in March 2005 as a sister publication to the Vijaya Karnataka daily. Originally, the paper had several simultaneously published editions.

In 2006, the paper was sold to Bennett, Coleman & Co. Ltd., publishers of India's leading newspaper, The Times of India, along with all of its sister publications including Vijaya Karnataka.

After Bennett, Coleman & Co. took over, they closed five editions of the newspaper in September 2006 and started The Times of India's Kannada version. Usha Kirana ceased.

== See also ==
- List of Kannada-language newspapers
- List of Kannada-language magazines
- List of newspapers in India
- Media in Karnataka
- Media of India
