= Kundan Vyas =

Indian journalist (born 1941)

Kundan Vyas (born 5 December 1941) is an Indian journalist who served as President of The Indian Newspaper Society. He is the recipient of Padma Bhushan, third highest civilian award in India and Lokmanya Tilak National Award for Excellence in Journalism.

== Personal life ==
He was born on 5 December 1941. He graduated with a degree in Arts and Law from the University of Mumbai.
