= Nina Nayak =

Indian politician

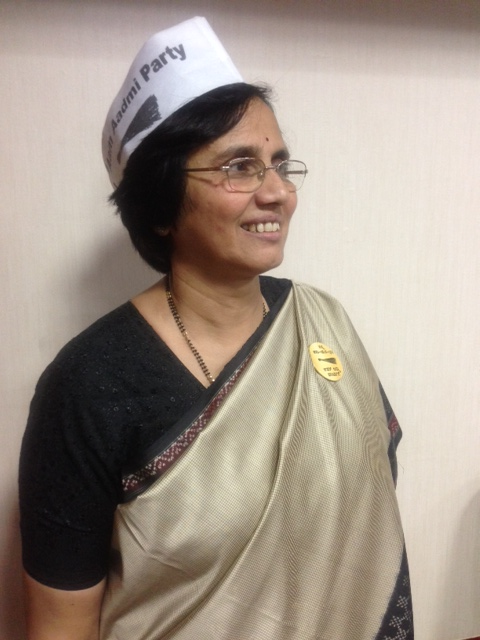
- Nina Nayak (March 2014)

Chairperson of Karnataka State Commission for Protection of Child Rights
- Incumbent
- Assumed office 2009

Chairperson Child Welfare Committee Bangalore
- In office 2003–2007

Vice-President of the Indian Council for Child Welfare
- In office 2006–2009

President Karnataka State Council for Child Welfare
- In office 1999–2008

Consultant to Community Health and Education Society
- In office 2004–2006

National Consultant to Child Rights and You
- In office 2002–2005

Personal details
- Born: 24 November 1953 (age 72)
- Party: Aam Aadmi Party
- Children: 2 adopted
- Education: University of Madras (Master of Arts

Nina P. Nayak (born 24 November 1953) is a social worker and child rights activist from Dakshina Kannada. Her career has been dedicated to the promotion and protection of child rights.

She gave a presentation on the role of children in governance in a TEDx event in Bangalore on 6 April 2012. She has also authored several articles and books. Nayak was a former chairperson for Karnataka State Commission for Protection of Child Rights. Previously, she was also the vice-president of the Indian Council for Child Welfare and member of the sub-committee on children in the National Planning Commission of India.

== Education and personal life ==
Nina Nayak has a Master's degree in social work with specialization in family and child welfare, and a Bachelor's degree in home science from University of Madras, with core subjects child development, food and nutrition. She has a certificate in human rights from Indira Gandhi National Open University (IGNOU). Nayak has two adopted children.

== Career ==
As a child rights activist for the last 30 years she has held several positions of responsibility

- Chairperson, Child Welfare Committee, Bangalore
- Chairperson, Karnataka State Commission for Protection of Child Rights for three terms.
- Vice-president of the Indian Council for Child Welfare.
- Member of the National Commission for Protection of Child Rights (equivalent to Secretary to Government of India)
- Member of the Sub-Committee on children for the 11th five-year Plan, National Planning Commission of India.
- Successfully defended Mohammad Afroz- One of the perpetrators of the Nirbhaya Rape and Murder Case on the grounds that he is a minor.

== Politics ==
On 10 March 2014 she was Aam Aadmi Party candidate for Bangalore South Lok Sabha constituency and received 21,403 votes (1.9% of the total votes polled) and lost to Ananth Kumar of BJP

2014 Indian general election: Bangalore South
Party	Candidate	Votes	%	±%
BJP	Ananth Kumar	633,816	56.88	+8.68
INC	Nandan Nilekani	4,05,241	36.37	−7.69
JD(S)	Ruth Manorama	25,677	2.30	−1.01
AAP	Nina Nayak	21,403	1.92	N/A
Independent	Pramod Muthalik	4,247	0.38	N/A
NOTA	None of the Above	7,414	0.67	N/A
Majority		2,28,575	20.51	+16.37
Turnout		11,14,359	55.75	+10.98
BJP hold		Swing	+8.68	
