= State Times =

Newspaper published in Jammu and Kashmir, India

- The Bold Voice of J&K

- Type: Daily Newspaper
- Format: Broadsheet, e-Paper
- Owner: State Times Group
- Publisher: State Times Group
- Founded: 30 November 1996; 29 years ago
- Language: English
- Headquarters: Ambphalla, Jammu, Jammu & Kashmir, 180001, India
- Website: www.statetimes.in

State Times is an Indian English language daily newspaper from the Indian state of Jammu & Kashmir. The publication is owned and operated by State Times Group, J&K. The newspaper is widely read in the northern states of India and has also included Delhi edition in its repertoire. It claims on its website that in 2007 it was decorated with J&K Government's Best Media Award.

== Editions ==
=== Broadsheet Edition ===
Jammu & Kashmir and Delhi

=== Online edition ===
State Times also publishes an online edition catering to the needs of people spending most of their time on digital media providing real time news updates via e-paper.

== Sections ==
- General News
- Editorial
- District News
- Business News
- National News
- News from J&K
- International News
- Sports News

== See also ==
- Communications in India
- List of newspapers in India
- Media of India
- History of Kashmir
