= K. B. Ganapathy =

Indian businessman and newspaper editor (1940–2025)

- Born: 1940; India
- Died: 13 July 2025 (aged 85); Mysuru, Karnataka, India
- Occupations: Editor; author
- Writing career
- Notable works: The Cross and the Coorgs (1994)

K. B. Ganapathy (1940 – 13 July 2025) was an Indian businessman and author. He was the Chief Editor of Star of Mysore, an Indian evening daily newspaper in the English language published and widely read in Mysore. He was also the editor of Mysooru Mithra, a morning daily newspaper of Mysore and in the Kannada language. He also wrote a number of books.

== Background ==
Ganapathy had a bachelor's degree in arts (B.A.) and another bachelor's degree in law (B.L.). He also held a Diploma in Journalism from Bombay (now Mumbai). Between the years 1961–1965, he worked as an advocate in the Karnataka High Court and Civil Courts, in Bangalore. He later worked as a Journalist in 'Free-Press Journal' and 'The Indian Express', as a reporter and then as the sub-editor, in Bombay until 1970. In 1970 he became the executive director of an Advertising Firm in Poona and remained as such until 1977.

Ganapathy died in Mysuru, Karnataka, India on 13 July 2025, at the age of 85.

== Editor ==
In 1978 he founded and published two newspapers in Mysore. One was in English called the Star of Mysore and the other in Kannada called Mysooru Mithra ("Mysore's Friend"). He was the editor and the publisher of both the newspapers ever afterwards. He was also a regular contributor to several newspapers and magazines. He served as a member of Karnataka Patrika Akademi (Karnataka Newspapers Academy) between the years 1993 and 1995. He was awarded the Karnataka Patrika Akademi Award in 2001. He was also the vice-president of Mysore District Journalists Association.

Widely travelled, he went to South-east Asia, the US, Israel, Egypt, England and Australia. For six years he was the vice-president of Cauvery College as well.

== Books ==
Ganapathy also wrote and published a number of novels in Kannada and English. In 1992, he wrote a novel called Adarshavadi in Kannada. The following year (1993) he wrote a travelogue called America – An Area of Light in English. The next year (1994) he wrote another novel called The Cross and the Coorgs in English. This was later written in Kannada as well. He also compiled a book called Abracadabra, which is a collection of his selected columns, in 2003. In 2009, he wrote another book in English called Gandhi's Epistle to Obama.
