= Mysooru Mithra =

Kannada-language newspaper in Mysore, India

Mysuru Mithra

- Type: Daily morning
- Format: Broadsheet
- Owner: K. B. Ganapathy
- Publisher: K. B. Ganapathy
- Founded: 1978
- Political alignment: Centre-Left
- Language: Kannada
- Headquarters: Mysuru
- Website: mysurumithra.com
- Free online archives: epaper.mysurumithra.com

Mysuru Mithra (transl. Mysore Friend) is an Indian Kannada language morning daily newspaper published from Mysore, India. A regional newspaper, it covers five districts: Mysuru, Mandya, Kodagu, Hassan and Chamarajanagar. This newspaper was launched in 1978. Its founder, editor and publisher was entrepreneur and writer K B Ganapathy.

== See also ==
- Star of Mysore (sister concern)
- List of Kannada-language newspapers
- List of Kannada-language magazines
- List of newspapers in India
- Media in Karnataka
- Media of India
