= Mana Telangana =

Indian newspaper

- అక్షరం సాక్షిగా ప్రజల పక్షం
- Type: Daily newspaper
- Format: Broadsheet
- Owner: Move on Media Pvt Ltd
- Founder(s): Anjaiah Polisetty, K.Sreenivas Reddy
- Editor: Anjaiah Polisetty
- Founded: 2015
- Language: Telugu
- Headquarters: Hyderabad, Telangana
- Website: http://manatelangana.news/

Mana Telangana is a registered Telugu language newspaper in the Indian State of Telangana. It is published simultaneously from Nizamabad, Karimnagar, Warangal, Khammam, Nalgonda, Hyderabad and Mahbubnagar.

The paper is also available in epaper format.

== See also ==
- List of newspapers in India
- List of newspapers in India by circulation
- List of newspapers in the world by circulation
