= The Indian Newspaper Society =

- Logo of The Indian Newspaper Society (INS)
- Abbreviation: INS
- Formation: 27 February 1939; 87 years ago
- Type: Trade association
- Legal status: Non-profit
- Purpose: Protecting interests of Indian newspapers
- Headquarters: Rafi Marg, New Delhi
- Location: Delhi, India
- Region served: India
- Official language: English
- President: Vivek Gupta (politician)
- Main organ: Executive Committee
- Affiliations: WAN-IFRA
- Website: indiannewspapersociety.in

Part of a series on

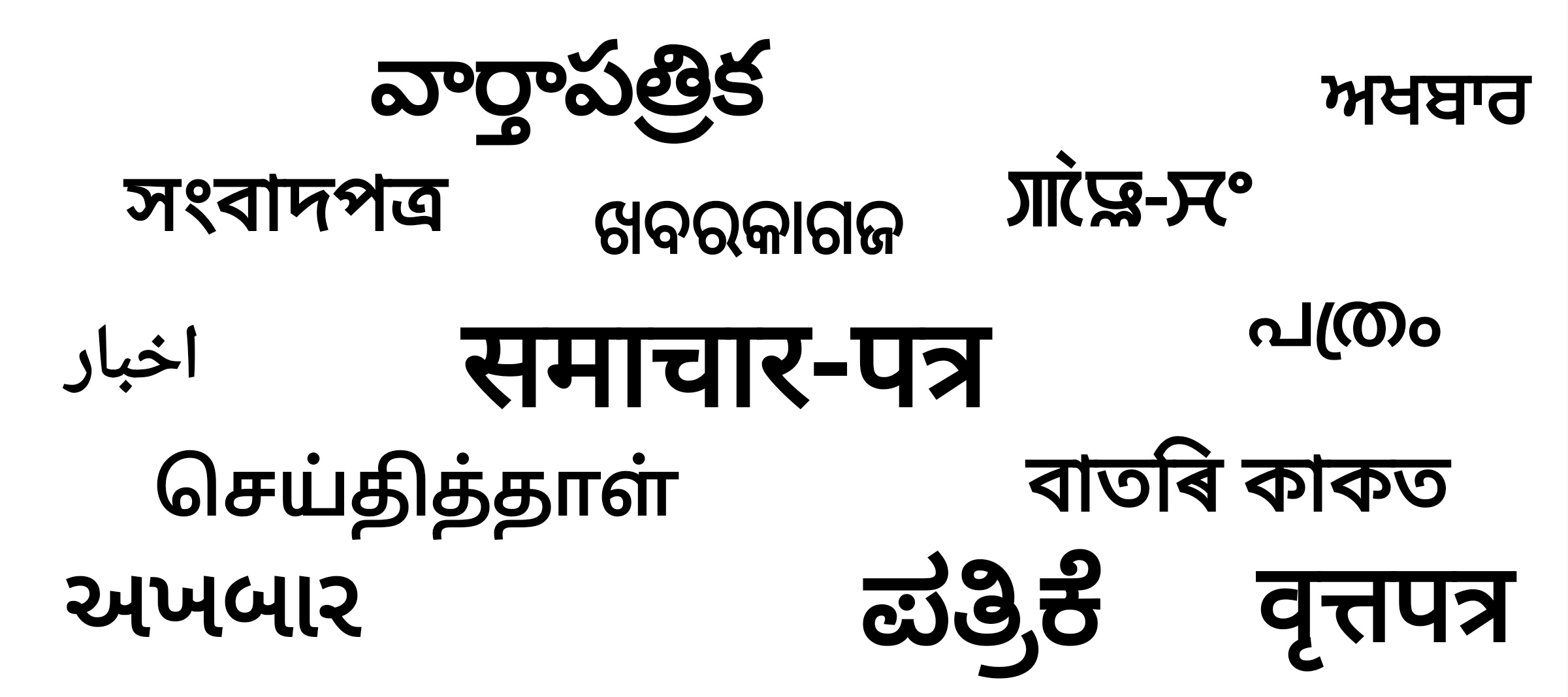

Newspapers of India
Category
Newspapers by languages
- Assamese
- Bengali
- Gujarati
- Hindi
- Kannada
- Malayalam
- Marathi
- Meitei (Manipuri)
- Punjabi
- Tamil
- Telugu
Related
- Newspapers by readership
- Registrar of Newspapers for India
- The Indian Newspaper Society

The Indian Newspaper Society (INS; formerly Indian and Eastern Newspaper Society) is an independent body authenticating circulation figures of newspapers and periodicals in India. The INS was founded in 1939, and is headquartered in the capital city of New Delhi.

== History ==
The genesis of the INS goes back to 1927 with the formation of "The India, Burma & Ceylon Newspapers' London Committee" which, in 1935, evolved into the Indian & Eastern Newspaper Society (IENS). On 27 February 1939, the IENS was formally inaugurated in New Delhi as INS. The purpose of the INS is to uphold the freedom of the press and authenticate circulation figures.

INS membership comprises the owners, proprietors and publishers of print media who discusses and suggest various measures to the government regarding the problems related to the newspaper industry. It is a kind of pressure group which works to protect the interest of newspaper industry in particular and print media in general.

The Indian newspaper industry today faces problems ranging from rising cost and paucity of newsprint to shrinking revenue from advertisements due to the rise of online media. The executive committee of INS represents 990 members, ranging from newspapers and journals to periodicals and magazines.

On 27 February 2014, the society marked its platinum jubilee with a celebration at Vigyan Bhavan, New Delhi. The President of India, Pranab Mukherjee, was chief guest and gave away commemorative plaques to extant founding members – Bombay Chronicle, The Hindu, The Hindustan Times, The Pioneer, The Statesman, The Times of India and The Tribune. On this occasion, President Mukherjee was also presented the first copy of a book Threescore and Fifteen – The Story of the Indian Newspaper Society written by INS president Ravindra Kumar. The book chronicles the accomplishments of and challenges faced by the society and is vital reading for media practitioners and policymakers.

Vivek Gupta of Sanmarg Group is the president of the society for the year 2025–26.

== Presidents ==
The presidents of INS include:

Name	Organisation	Year
Arthur Moore	The Statesman	1939 - 43
Devdas Gandhi	Hindustan Times	1943 - 45
H.W. Smith	The Times of India	1945 - 46
W.J.B. Walker	The Statesman	1946 - 47
Kasturi Srinivasan	The Hindu	1947 - 48
Tushar Kanti Ghosh	Amrita Bazaar Patrika	1948 - 49
Desh Bandhu Gupta	Daily Tej	1949 - 50
M.N. Cama	The Bombay Chronicle	1950 - 51
Ramnath Goenka	The Indian Express	1951 - 52
Suresh Chandra Majumdar	The Hindustan Standard	1952 - 53
C.R. Srinivasan	Swadesamitran	1953 - 54
J.C. Jain	The Times of India	1954 - 55
Nirmal Chandra Ghosh	Jugantar	1955 - 56
G. Narasimhan	The Hindu	1956 - 57
H.R. Moharay	Samyukta Karnataka	1957 - 58
Upendra Acharya	The Indian Nation	1958 - 59
D.M. Harris	The Statesman	1959 - 60
Dr. N.B. Parulekar	Daily Sakal	1960 - 61
A.B. Nair	Free Press Journal	1961 - 62
R.R. Diwakar	Samyukta Karnataka	1962 - 63
A.K. Sarkar	Ananda Bazaar Patrika	1963 - 64
K.M. Cherian	Malayala Manorama	1964 - 65
G.N. Sahi	The Hindustan Times	1965 - 66
C.G.K. Reddy	Sports and Pastime	1966 - 67
J.M.D. Souza	Illustrated Weekly of India	1967 - 68
M.L. Ganguli	Jugantar	1968 - 69
M. Yunus Dehlvi	Shama	1969 - 70
C.A. Narayan	Sunday Standard	1970 - 71
C.R. Irani	The Statesman	1971 - 72
K. Narendra	Daily Pratap	1972 - 73
K.M. Mathew	Malayala Manorama	1973 - 74
P.K. Roy	Amrita Weekly	1974 - 75
A.G. Sheorey	The Nagpur Times	1975 - 76
V.M. Nair	Mathrubhumi	1976 - 77
Dr. Ram S. Tarneja	The Economic Times	1977 - 78
B.D. Goenka	Andhra Prabha	1978 - 79
Shantilal A. Shah	Gujarat Samachar	1979 - 80
K.L. Sarkar	Hindustan Standard	1980 - 81
Mammen Varghese	Malayala Manorama	1981 - 82
Ramesh Chandra	Navbharat Times	1982 - 83
N. Murali	The Hindu	1983 - 84
Saroj Goenka	Andhra Prabha	1984 - 85
Basudev Ray	Sunday Statesman	1985 - 86
R.M. Cama	Bombay Samachar	1986 - 87
Tuhin Kanti Ghosh	Northern Indian Patrika	1987 - 88
Pravinchandra V. Gandhi	Janmabhoomi	1988 - 89
Mahendra Mohan Gupta	Dainik Jagran	1989 - 90
Naresh Mohan	Hindustan Times	1990 - 91
P.R. Krishnamoorthy	Maharashtra Times	1991 - 92
R. Lakshmipathy	Dinamalar	1992 - 93
Adhip K. Sarkar	The Telegraph	1993 - 94
Vishwa Bandhu Gupta	Daily Tej	1994 - 95
Dr. B.S. Adityan	Vaaraantari Rani	1995 - 96
Viveck Goenka	The Indian Express	1996 - 97
Vijay Darda	Lokmat	1997 - 98
Mammen Mathew	Malayala Manorama	1998 - 99 2018 - 19
Shobha Subrahmanyam	Ananda Bazaar Patrika	1999 - 00
Vijay Kumar Chopra	Hind Samachar	2000 - 01
Pratap G. Pawar	Sakal	2001 - 02
Abhay Chhajlani	Nai Dunia	2002 - 03
M.P. Veerendrakumar	Mathrubhumi	2003 - 04
Pradeep Guha	Filmfare	2004 - 05
Jacob Mathew	Vanitha	2005 - 06
Hormusji N. Cama	Bombay Samachar Weekly	2006 - 07 2008 - 09
Bahubali S. Shah	Gujarat Samachar	2007 - 08
T. Venkattram Reddy	Deccan Chronicle	2009 - 10
Kundan R. Vyas	Vyapar	2010 - 11
Ashish Bagga	India Today	2011 - 12
K.N. Tilak Kumar	Prajavani	2012 - 13
Ravindra Kumar	The Statesman	2013 - 14
Kiran B. Vadodaria	Sambhaav Metro	2014 - 15
P.V. Chandran	Grihalakshmi	2015 - 16
Somesh Sharma	Rashtradoot Saptahik	2016 - 17
Akila Urankar	Business Standard	2017 - 18
Shailesh Gupta	Mid-Day	2019 - 20
L. Adimoolam	Health & the Antispetic	2020 - 21
Mohit Jain	The Economic Times	2021 - 22
K. Raja Prasad Reddy	Sakshi	2022 - 23
Rakesh Sharma	Aaj Samaj	2023 - 24
M.V. Shreyams Kumar	Mathrubhumi	2024 - 25
Vivek Gupta	Sanmarg Group	2025 - 26
