= Pandit Jugal Kishore Shukla =

- पं० जुगल किशोर शुक्ल
- Born: c. 1788; Kanpur
- Died: 1853; Calcutta, Bengal Presidency
- Occupations: Journalist, editor, lawyer
- Years active: 1826–1852
- Known for: Founding and editing Udant Martand
- Notable work: Udant Martand (Note: First Hindi-language newspaper, published 1826–1827.); Samyadant Martand

Pandit Jugal Kishore Shukla (1788–1853) was an Indian journalist, editor and lawyer who founded and edited Udant Martand, generally regarded as the first Hindi-language newspaper published in India. He was a native of Kanpur, in present-day Uttar Pradesh, and later worked in Calcutta (now Kolkata), where he was employed as a proceedings reader at the Sadr Diwani Adalat before becoming a pleader.

== Early life ==
Shukla was born in 1788 in a Kanyakubja Brahmin family. Accounts of his early life identify him with the Kanpur region of present-day Uttar Pradesh. A later account identifies his ancestral village as Bhatankheda in present-day Unnao district and gives his date of birth as 17 May 1788; the account is based partly on information supplied by a descendant of Shukla.

== Career ==
Shukla moved to Calcutta, where he worked at the Sadr Diwani Adalat as a proceedings reader. He subsequently worked as a pleader. He was proficient in several languages, including Sanskrit, Persian, English and Bengali, according to later accounts of his career.

== Udant Martand ==
=== Establishment ===
In February 1826, Shukla applied to the colonial government for permission to publish a weekly newspaper in the Hindi language and Devanagari script. Permission was granted on 16 February 1826. The licence authorised Munnu Thakur to print and publish the newspaper while Shukla was identified as its person responsible for conducting it.

The first issue of Udant Martand was published in Calcutta on 30 May 1826. Shukla was its editor and publisher, while Munnu Thakur was associated with its printing and management.

The newspaper was printed in Devanagari and employed a mixture of Khari Boli and Braj Bhasha. Its first issue had a circulation of approximately 500 copies, and the newspaper was published.

=== Purpose and contents ===
In the first issue, Shukla explained that the newspaper was intended to serve the interests of Hindustanis by providing news in their own language. He contrasted this with the existing newspapers published in English, Persian and Bengali, whose contents were primarily accessible to readers familiar with those languages.

The newspaper published domestic and foreign news, local reports, commentary and other material. Reports concerning contemporary affairs in North India also appeared in its pages.

=== Financial difficulties and closure ===
Udant Martand faced difficulties in attracting subscribers. Its publication from Calcutta placed it far from its principal potential readership in northern India, while postal and distribution costs made circulation outside Calcutta expensive. Shukla sought government assistance, including concessions relating to postage and subscriptions, but the newspaper could not obtain sufficient financial support.

Udant Martand ceased publication on 4 December 1827 after approximately eighteen months. The newspaper had published 79 issues before its closure.

== Later journalism ==
After the closure of Udant Martand, Shukla continued to be associated with journalism. In 1850, he launched another newspaper, Samyadant Martand, also reported as Samdant Martand, from Calcutta. The newspaper continued for approximately two years and ceased publication in 1852.

== Death ==
Shukla died in 1853. Later accounts give his age at death as 65, consistent with the commonly cited birth year of 1788.

== Legacy ==
Shukla is principally remembered for establishing Udant Martand, generally recognized as the first Hindi-language newspaper published in India. The newspaper's publication on 30 May 1826 is commemorated annually as Hindi Journalism Day.

The historical importance of Udant Martand was subsequently documented by historians of Hindi journalism. Ambika Prasad Vajpayee discussed Shukla and the newspaper in his history of Hindi newspapers, while later research in the twentieth century helped establish the newspaper's place in the history of Hindi journalism.
