= Telangana Today =

English language newspaper in India

- Peoples Voice
- Type: Daily Newspaper
- Format: Print, online
- Owner: Telangana Publications Pvt. Ltd
- Publisher: Telangana Publications Pvt. Ltd
- Editor: K. Srinivas Reddy
- Associate editor: S. Srivatsan
- Founded: 15 December 2016; 9 years ago
- Political alignment: Left
- Language: English
- Headquarters: Hyderabad, Telangana, India
- Sister newspapers: Namasthe Telangana
- Website: www.telanganatoday.com
- Free online archives: epaper.telanganatoday.com

Telangana Today is a registered English-language Indian daily newspaper headquartered in Hyderabad, Telangana, India. The publication focuses mainly on politics and developments in the state of Telangana. The newspaper is published by Telangana Publications Pvt. Ltd, which is owned by K. Chandrashekar Rao, who is also the former Chief minister of Telangana and founder of Telangana Rashtra Samithi.

The newspaper is also available in ePaper format.

== History ==
Telangana Today was launched on 15 December 2016. It is a sister publication of a Telugu Daily, Namasthe Telangana, and the TV channel T News.

== Circulation and Revenue ==
Based on the data obtained from Right to Information, classified advertising expenditure of the Government of Telangana on Telangana Today increased 17-fold between 2016 and 2018.

== See also ==
- List of newspapers in India
- List of newspapers in India by circulation
- List of newspapers in the world by circulation
