= Uttarbanga Sambad =

Indian newspaper

- Front page of the Siliguri City edition, 6 August 2026
- Type: Daily
- Format: Broadsheet
- Owner: Sabyasachi Talukdar
- Founder: Suhas Chandra Talukdar
- Publisher: Sabyasachi Talukdar
- Editor-in-chief: Sabyasachi Talukdar
- Editor: Sabyasachi Talukdar
- General manager: Pralay Kanti Chakraborty
- News editor: Deep Saha
- Founded: 19 May 1980; 46 years ago
- Political alignment: Neutral
- Language: Bengali
- Headquarters: Siliguri
- City: Siliguri, Cooch Behar, Malda City, Alipurduar, Jalpaiguri
- Country: India
- Circulation: 160,517 daily (as of Jan-June 2020)Audit Bureau of Circulation
- RNI: RN/35012/80
- Website: uttarbangasambad.com

Uttarbanga Sambad is a Bengali language broadsheet published from Siliguri.

Uttarbanga Sambad was started on 19 May 1980 in a small letterpress in Siliguri. Due to its huge popularity, in 1981 web offset press was installed. Computerized typesetting was introduced in the year 1985. Afterwards, hi-speed 4-colour web offset press was introduced. It is one of the popular newspaper in the North Bengal region of West Bengal.

Uttarbanga Sambad is now printed simultaneously from Siliguri, Cooch Behar, Malda City, Alipurduar. The founder editor of Uttarbanga Sambad was Suhash Chandra Talukdar. Presently it is run by his son Sabyasachi Talukder.
