= Dainik Jugasankha =

Indian newspaper

Dainik Jugasankha, also transliterated Dainik Yugashankha, (Bengali: দৈনিক যুগশঙ্খ) is a Bengali daily newspaper published simultaneously from Kolkata, Guwahati, Silchar, Siliguri and Durgapur. With a circulation of around 150,000 copies, it is one of the top ten newspapers in Assam.

== History ==
Dainik Jugasankha was founded by Barta Bhagirath Baidyanath Nath, or Baidyanath Nath, in 1950, where it was published from Silchar. The newspaper expanded in the 21st century publishing from Guwahati beginning in 2000 and then from Dibrugarh in 2006.In the middle of 2015, Kolkata Edition of Dainik Jugasankha started. In 2016, Jugasankha started publishing its Siliguri Edition. From 2019, Dibrugarh Edition became only a print edition and Durgapur Edition started its function.

== Literary award ==
The Dainik Jugasankha Group presents an annual literary prize for the Bengali language, Jugasankha Sahitya Puraskar, that is described as prestigious and it began awards for journalists in 2013.

- 2014 Literary Prize: Swarnali Biswas Bhattacharjee
- 2013 Literary Prize: Atin Das, poet and former editor of Dainik Jugasankha
- 2012 Literary Prize: Usharanjan Bhattacharjee
- 2011 Literary Prize : Dr. Topodhir Bhattacharjee, former VC of Assam University, Silchar.
- 2010 Literary Prize: Bikash Sarkar

== Other Activity ==
Dainik Jugasankha promotes sports activities. Jugasankha Prize money Cup Football Tournament (started in 2005) and Baidyanath Nath Memorial Trophy Prize money Cricket Tournament (started in 2001) are two inter-school sports tournaments which are organised by DSA, Silchar.
