= Vishwavani News =

Indian newspaper

Vishwavani

- Type: Daily newspaper
- Format: Broadsheet
- Owner: Vishweshwar Bhat
- Founder: Patil Puttappa
- Publisher: Vishwaakshara Media Pvt Ltd
- Editor: Vishweshwar Bhat
- Founded: 1960
- Political alignment: Centre-Right
- Language: Kannada
- Headquarters: Bengaluru,
- Website: vishwavani.news
- Free online archives: epaper.vishwavani.news

Vishwavani daily has around 56 years of history, published by Patil Puttappa from Hubballi. Vishweshwar Bhat is the managing director and chief editor of the news paper. The tag line on its masthead is " Vishwasave Vishwa". Karnataka Chief Minister Siddaramaiah inaugurated the revamped edition on 15 January 2016.

Vishwa Vani is highly admired for its Coloumns written by Thyagaraj, B.Ganapathi, Ravindra Joshi, Srivathsa Joshi and the Editor-in-chief Vishweshwar Bhat himself whose coloumns appear on Thursday and Sunday respectively. Pratap Simha Member of Parliament of Mysuru & Kodagu – who was a journalist himself also writes his weekly coloumn 'Bettale Jagattu' every Saturday. Vishwa Vani extensively covered the death of Centenarian seer Sri Sri Shivakumara Swamiji; even devoting a couple of pages depicting the childhood, education, support of parents and taking Sanyasa in a beautiful informative manner. Vishwa Vani is also criticized for being a face of Hindu nationalist propagandas and promoting Brahministic Ideologies, It was subject to intense criticism for posting and publishing derogatory and distorted articles and books on the 12th century reformer Basavanna .

The travelogues written by Vishweshwar Bhat in his weekly coloumn and in its supplementary provide the detailed insights of the culture, traditions, people, interesting facts, behaviour of the people, cleanliness, cuisine, books, nature, infrastructure and a range of other issues. The Editor-in-chief Vishweshwar Bhat also answers the queries of his readers. Rohith Chakrateertha is also one of the prominent columnists who has been working since its inauguration.

== See also ==
- List of Kannada-language newspapers
- List of Kannada-language magazines
- List of newspapers in India
- Media in Karnataka
- Media of India
