= Sarkar Ki Upalabdhiya =

- Type: Daily newspaper
- Format: Broadsheet
- Publisher: Mr. Vijay Kumar Dixit
- Founded: 1993
- Language: Hindi, Urdu, English, Sanskrit
- Headquarters: Lucknow, India
- Circulation: 140,855
- Website: sarkarkiupalabdhiya.blogspot.com

Sarkar Ki Upalabdhiya is a newspaper published in Hindi, Urdu, English, and Sanskrit from Lucknow, Barabanki, Faizabad & Shravasti. It was started in 1993.
