= Namadhu Amma =

Indian Tamil-language newspaper

Namadhu Puratchi Thalaivi Amma

- Front page of Namadhu Amma for 3 April 2023
- Type: Daily newspaper
- Format: Broadsheet E-paper
- Owner(s): S. P. Velumani; C. V. Shanmugam
- Founder: Edappadi K. Palaniswami
- Publisher: R. Chandrasekhar
- Editor: S. Kalyana Sundaram
- Founded: 24 February 2018; 8 years ago
- Political alignment: All India Anna Dravida Munnetra Kazhagam (Rebel Faction)
- Language: Tamil
- Headquarters: 4, Ananda Road, Alwarpet, Chennai - 600018, Tamil Nadu, India
- Country: India
- Circulation: Tamil Nadu
- Website: www.namadhuamma.net

Namadhu Amma (transl. Our Mother) is an Indian Tamil language newspaper started by Edappadi K. Palaniswami.

The 'Namadhu Amma' daily newspaper was launched in Chennai on 24 February 2018 marking the 70th birthday of former All India Anna Dravida Munnetra Kazhagam General Secretary and former Chief Minister of Tamil Nadu J. Jayalalithaa. Our Amma Daily, which serves as the official news paper of the AIADMK, will have a minimum of 12 pages. S. Kalyanasundaram is The Current Chief editor of Namadhu Amma daily.

== Background ==
J. Jayalalithaa launched the Namadhu MGR Newspaper as the official mouthpiece of the AIADMK on 11 July 1988 and Jaya TV as its visual media in August 1999. After the demise of Jayalalithaa, T. T. V. Dhinakaran took control of the Namadhu MGR and Jaya TV which were held by V. K. Sasikala's family. So the news related to then ruling AIADMK government were blacked out in their newspaper and Channel.

Therefore, a new daily newspaper named Namadhu Amma was launched on 24 February 2018 to publish the news of the AIADMK government and the party. R. Chandrasekhar became the publisher of the Newspaper.

Since its inception, Marudu Alaguraj was the editor-in-chief of the magazine from 2018 to 2022. He resigned as the editor-in-chief of the newspaper on 29 June 2022 in protest against the single leadership in the party. On 6 August 2022, S. Kalyanasundaram became the editor-in-chief of Namadhu Amma newspaper.

On 21 May 2025, Namadhu Amma was taken control by the rebel faction led by S. P. Velumani and C. V. Shanmugam. The EPS faction launch a new counter daily named Porvaal.

== See also ==
- List of newspapers in India
