= Udant Martand =

First Indian Hindi-language newspaper (1826)

The Udant Martand उदन्त मार्तण्ड
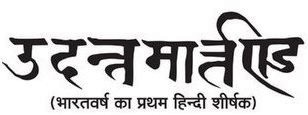
- Type: Weekly newspaper
- Publisher: Jugal Kishore Shukla
- Founded: 30 May 1826; 199 years ago
- Ceased publication: 4 December 1827; 198 years ago
- Language: Hindi
- Headquarters: 37 Amartalla Lane, Kolutolla, near Barabazar Market, Kolkata
- Circulation: 500 (1st issue)

Udant Martand (lit. 'The Rising Sun') is the first Hindi language newspaper published in India. Started on 30 May 1826, from Calcutta (now Kolkata), the weekly newspaper was published every Tuesday by Pandit Jugal Kishore Shukla. It was closed on 4 December 1827 due to financial crisis.

== History ==
By the early 19th century, educational publications in Hindi had already started, thus journalism was only a matter time. By the 1820s, newspapers in several Indian languages were starting, including Bengali and Urdu; however, printing in Devanagari script was still rare. Soon after Calcutta School Book started printing, Samachar Darpan, a Bengali journal which started in 1819, had some portions in Hindi. However, Hindi reading audience base was still at a nascent stage. Thus few of the early attempts were successful, but they nevertheless were a start.

Shukla was a lawyer originally from Kanpur in Uttar Pradesh, who had settled in Calcutta, and became Proceedings Reader at the Sadr Diwani Adalat (Civil and Revenue High Court), and later on a pleader. On 16 February 1826, he along with Munnu Thakur of Banstala Gali, Calcutta, received a license to publish a newspaper in Hindi.

The newspaper was started on 30 May 1826; with it for the first time a newspaper was published completely in Hindi, using Devanagari script. Udant Martand employed a mix of Khari Boli and Braj Bhasha dialects of Hindi. The first issue printed 500 copies, and the newspaper was published every Tuesday. The office of newspaper was at 37, Amartalla Lane, Kolutolla, near Barabazar Market in Kolkata.

Owing to its distance from the Hindi-speaking areas of North India, the newspaper had difficulty in finding subscribers. The publisher tried to get government subscription, and patronage in the form of postal fee exemption for eight newspapers to be posted to North India. However, it didn't receive the subscription and only one newspaper was allowed postal fee exemption, which meant that the paper could never be financially viable. Nevertheless, it briefly gained prominence for featuring the controversy that rose Bengali-language magazine, Samachar Chandrika and traders from interiors, who were based in Calcutta.

== Legacy ==
Today, "Hindi Journalism Day" or Hindi Patrakarita Diwas is celebrated on 30 May each year, as it marked the "beginning to journalism in Hindi language".

== Sources ==
- Ram Ratan Bhatnagar (1947). The Rise and Growth of Hindi Journalism, 1826-1945: Being an Attempt at a History of Hindi Journalism in Historical, Chronological and Evolutionary Perspective. Kitab Mahal. p. 27.
