= The Assam Chronicle =

- Type: Daily newspaper
- Language: English
- Headquarters: Guwahati
- City: Guwahati, Assam
- Country: India

The Assam Chronicle is an Indian English-language newspaper published from Guwahati, Assam, India.

The periodical was deemed one of the prominent English-language newspapers of Assam.
