= Sikkim Express =

English daily newspaper published from Sikkim, India

- OF THIS LAND, FOR ITS PEOPLE
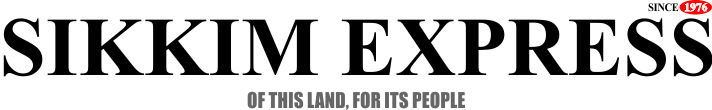

- Type: Daily newspaper
- Format: Broadsheet
- Founded: 1976
- Political alignment: Left
- Language: English
- Headquarters: Kashiraj Pradhan Road, Nam Nam, Gangtok, Sikkim, 737101
- Country: India
- Website: www.sikkimexpress.com
- Free online archives: epaper.sikkimexpress.com

Sikkim Express is an English daily newspaper published from Gangtok, Sikkim, India. It is the oldest and largest circulated English daily newspaper in Sikkim. The news paper started as weekly in 1976 and converted as daily in 2003 and it is the first English newspaper of Sikkim state. It won Best Small Newspaper (English) in India at All India Conference of Small and Medium Newspaper in 1986.
