= Arunachal Front =

- Type: Daily newspaper
- Editor: Nani Kojin
- Language: English
- Website: arunachalfront.info

Arunachal Front is an Indian English-language daily newspaper published from Naharlagun, Arunachal Pradesh. News from the state (i.e. Arunachal Pradesh), the country, and the world are covered in this newspaper.
