= Parichay Times =

Indian newspaper

- Type: Daily newspaper
- Format: Broadsheet
- Owner: Yogesh sharma
- Founded: 2004
- Political alignment: Centre
- Language: Hindi
- Headquarters: 4–5, Veer Savarkar Block, Madhuban Road, New Delhi-110 092, India
- City: Delhi
- Country: India
- Circulation: 43,000
- RNI: DELHIN/2004/13033
- Website: parichaytimes.com

Parichay Times is a Hindi daily newspaper established in 2004, published by Parichay Publication in Delhi, India.

== Editions ==
- Delhi (Delhi edition, sub editions of City, Gurgaon, Noida, Faridabad and Ghaziabad)
