= Pir Lujeh =

Pir Lujeh پيرلوجه
- Village
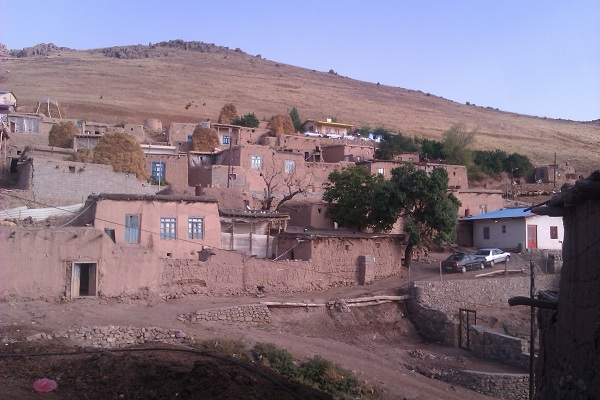
- village view

- Location within Iran
- Coordinates: 37°44′11″N 47°06′07″E
- Country: Iran
- Province: East Azerbaijan
- County: Bostanabad
- Bakhsh: Tekmeh Dash
- Rural District: Abbas-e Sharqi

Population (2006)
  - Total: 114
- Time zone: UTC+3:30 (IRST)
  - Summer (DST): UTC+4:30 (IRDT)

Pir Lujeh (Persian: پيرلوجه, also Romanized as Pīr Lūjeh; also known as Parichah and Paricheh) is a village in Abbas-e Sharqi Rural District, Tekmeh Dash District, Bostanabad County, East Azerbaijan Province, Iran. As of the 2006 census, its population was 114 people in 23 families.
