= List of Kannada-language newspapers =

Part of a series on

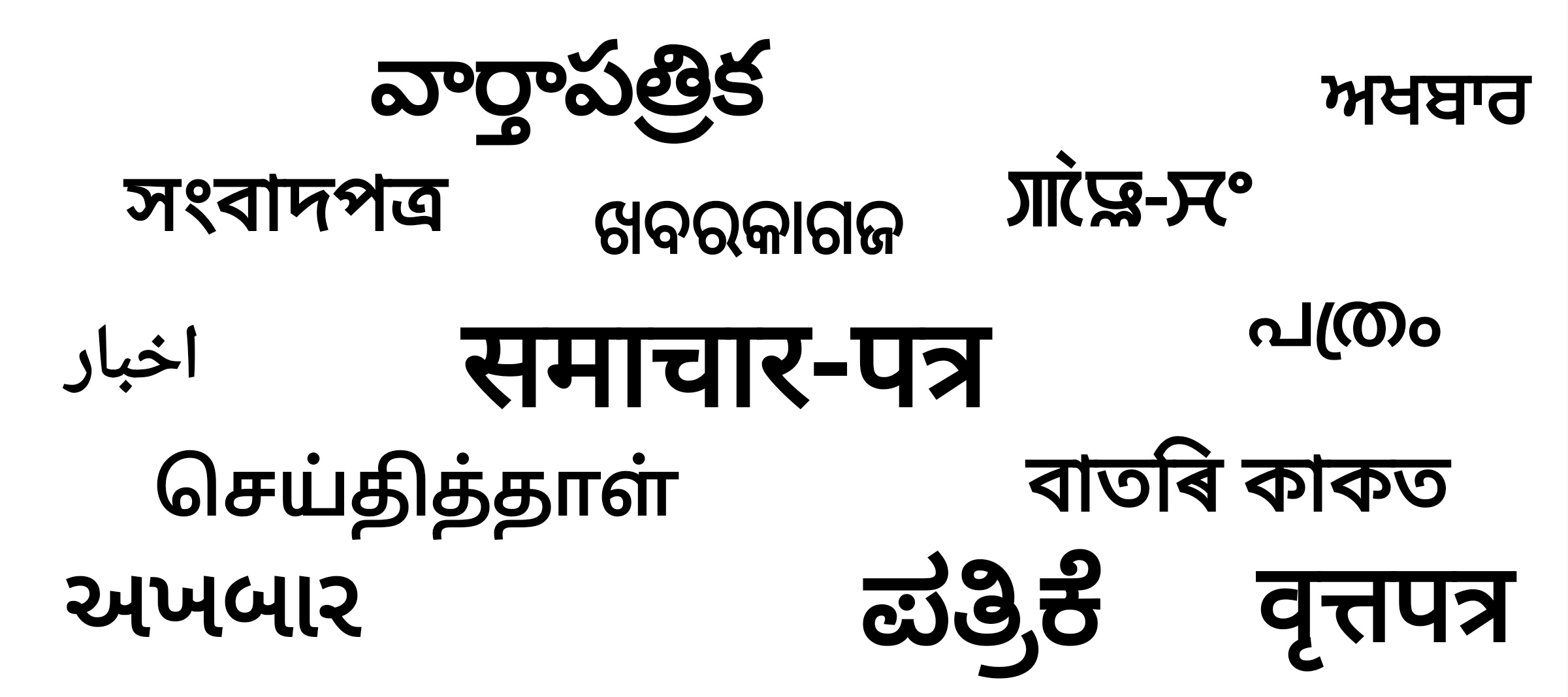

Newspapers of India
Category
Newspapers by languages
- Assamese
- Bengali
- Gujarati
- Hindi
- Kannada
- Malayalam
- Marathi
- Meitei (Manipuri)
- Punjabi
- Tamil
- Telugu
Related
- Newspapers by readership
- Registrar of Newspapers for India
- The Indian Newspaper Society

The following is a list of notable Kannada language newspapers

== Daily ==
- Samyukta Karnataka
- Prajavani
- Kranti
- Kannada Prabha
- Udayavani
- Hosa Digantha
- Karavali Ale
- Mangaluru Samachara
- Mysooru Mithra
- Sanjevani
- Usha Kirana (now defunct)
- Varthabharathi
- Vijaya Karnataka
- Vijayavani
- Vishwavani
- Uttar Karnataka
- Udayakala
- Phruthvi Madhyma

== Weekly ==
- Hai Bangalore
- Lankesh Patrike
- Suddi Sangaati

== See also ==
- Media in Karnataka
- List of Kannada films
- List of Kannada magazines
- List of Kannada radio stations
- List of Kannada television channels
- List of newspapers in India
