= Janam Sakshi =

Indian Telugu language newspaper

- Type: Daily newspaper
- Founded: 2002
- Headquarters: Address: JANAMSAKSHI DAILY NEWS OFFICE, #301, 3rd Floor, Pavani indradhanush complex Road No 2, Banjara Hills-main road Hyderabad500034
- Website: http://janamsakshi.org/

Janam Sakshi is a Telugu -language newspaper published in the Indian state of Telangana, with editions printed simultaneously from Hyderabad and Karimnagar. It is also available in an e-paper format. The newspaper is Editor printer, publisher, and owner, M. M. Rahman and is recognized in the "Big Daily Newspapers" category by the Information and Public Relations Department of the Telangana state government. Janam Sakshi holds the distinction of being a member of the Indian Newspaper Society (INS), one of the most prestigious associations for newspapers in the country.
