= Namasthe Telangana =

Indian Telugu-language daily newspaper

- Mana Rashtram, Mana Patrika
- Type: Daily newspaper
- Format: Print, Online
- Owner: Telangana Publications Pvt. Ltd
- Publisher: Telangana Publications Pvt. Ltd
- Editor: Thigulla Krishna Murthy
- Founded: 6 June 2011; 15 years ago
- Political alignment: Center-Right
- Language: Telugu
- Headquarters: Hyderabad, Telangana, India
- Sister newspapers: Telangana Today
- Website: ntnews.com

Namasthe Telangana Indian Telugu-language daily newspaper published from Hyderabad, Telangana. It was launched on 6 June 2011. The paper aims to mainly focus on politics and developments of Telangana State. The newspaper is published by Telangana Publications Pvt. Limited, owned by K. Chandrashekar Rao, the former chief minister of Telangana.

With more than 3,00,000 copies sold per day, it is the third-largest newspaper In Telangana after Eenadu and Sakshi.

== History ==
The newspaper started in June 2011 with Allam Narayana as Editor in Chief, at Telangana Bhavan, TRS party headquarters. Now Thigulla Krishna Murthy took over as the editor of the paper. Chairman and managing director C. L. Rajam, who managed the paper from October 2011 to 1 July 2014, handed over the reins again to Divakonda Damodar Rao, the founder and managing director of the paper. The columnists include; Editorial by Katta Shekhar, R. Vidyasagar Rao.

== Publishing ==
It is published from Hyderabad, Karimnagar, Warangal, Nizamabad, Khammam, Nalgonda and Mahbubnagar.

== Readership and Revenue ==
According to India Today survey 2017, Namasthe Telangana stood as the third most read newspaper in Telangana, with 31.49 lac circulation, behind Eenadu and Sakshi. Since 2014, It grew by 88% in three years since.

Based on the data obtained from Right to Information, Expenditure of the Government of Telangana on Namasthe Telangana has seen an increase of 387.4%, from ₹2.6 crore to ₹12.8 crore between 2016 and 2018.

== See also ==
- List of newspapers in India
- List of newspapers in India by circulation
- List of newspapers in the world by circulation
