= Karnataka State Commission for Protection of Child Rights =

The Karnataka State Commission for Protection of Child Rights (KSCPCR) a Karnataka Governmental commission, established on 3 July 2009 by the Commission for Protection of Child Rights Act, 2005 (an Act of Parliament) and thus is a statutory body. Its objective is "to protect, promote and defend child rights" in Karnataka. KSCPCR is the sixth such commission in the country. As defined by the commission, child includes those up to the age of 18 years.

The Commission's role is to review and examine the safeguards meant for the protection of child rights and its effective implementations by recommending measures. Petitions related to the violation of child rights are heard by the commission which functions as a civil court. The complaints relating to right to education are also enquired as per its mandate. The chairperson of the commission was Dr. Kripa Amar Alva.

== Functions ==
The Commission's functions as mentioned in the Act are as follows:

1. The Commission can perform following functions, namely;

a. To review and examine the safeguards meant for the protection of rights of children and its effective implementations by recommending measures.
b. Present periodical reports of those safeguards to Government.
c. Inquiry into child rights violation and initiation of case proceedings.
d. Factors inhibiting rights of children that are affected by HIV/ AIDS, prostitution, trafficking, torture, exploitation, pornography, terrorism, riots, communal and domestic violence and natural disasters will be examined appropriate remedial measures to be recommended
e. To recommend appropriate remedial measures to children needing special care and protection, in distress, marginalised, without family, children of prisoners, children in conflict with law and juveniles.
f. International laws and treaties to be studied and a regular review of existing programmes, policies and activities on child rights to be conducted and recommend for its effective implementation.
g. To Research on child rights.
h. To use advertisements and other means to spread awareness of child rights and the safeguards available for protection of child rights, in the society.
i. The views of children to be promoted, respected and considered in work of all Government bodies that deal with children.
j. Promote activity for Inclusion of right of children into the school curriculum, training of teachers and personnel dealing with children.

2. Places where children are lodged or detained for treatment, reformation or protection such as juvenile home or any place of residence for children can be inspected or asked to be inspected by the commission and remedial action, if needed can be requested.

a. Complaints related to below matters should be enquired and suo motu action can be taken, related to:

i. Child rights violation and its deprivation.
ii. Lack of implementation of laws meant for child development and protection.
iii. Lack of compliance of policy decisions, guidelines or instructions to reduce hardships, provide relief and ensuring child welfare. And to take these issues appropriate authorities

b. Any other function that can be necessary for the promotion of child rights and above functions.

== Powers of the Commission ==
The Commission has all powers of the Civil Court while enquiring a case. Some of the major power are to Summon individuals, discovery and production of documents, receiving evidence on Affidavits, requesting any Public record from courts, Issuing commissions for witnesses or documents examination and to forward cases to Magistrates to try cases which falls in their jurisdiction.

After completing the inquiry in a case the below actions can be taken.

1. To recommend the Government for prosecution or necessary action on any violation.
2. To approach the High Court or the Supreme Court for necessary orders, directions or writs.
3. To recommend the Government or authority to provide required relief to the victim or his family members.

== Children's Courts ==
To provide speedy trial of cases related to children the State Government will set up Children's courts and provide all the necessary personnel and infrastructure for conducting the cases.

== See also ==
- National Commission for Protection of Child Rights
- Constitution of India
- UN Convention on the Rights of the Child
