= Tamil Murasu (India) =

Indian newspaper

- Type: Daily newspaper
- Format: Print, online
- Owner: Sun TV Network
- Founded: 2014
- Political alignment: Independent
- Language: Tamil
- Website: tm.dinakaran.com

Tamil Murasu is a daily evening Tamil language newspaper published from nine cities of Tamil Nadu and Puducherry in India. It is owned by Kalanidhi Maran's Sun TV Network.
