= Suryaa (newspaper) =

Newspaper in Hyderabad, India

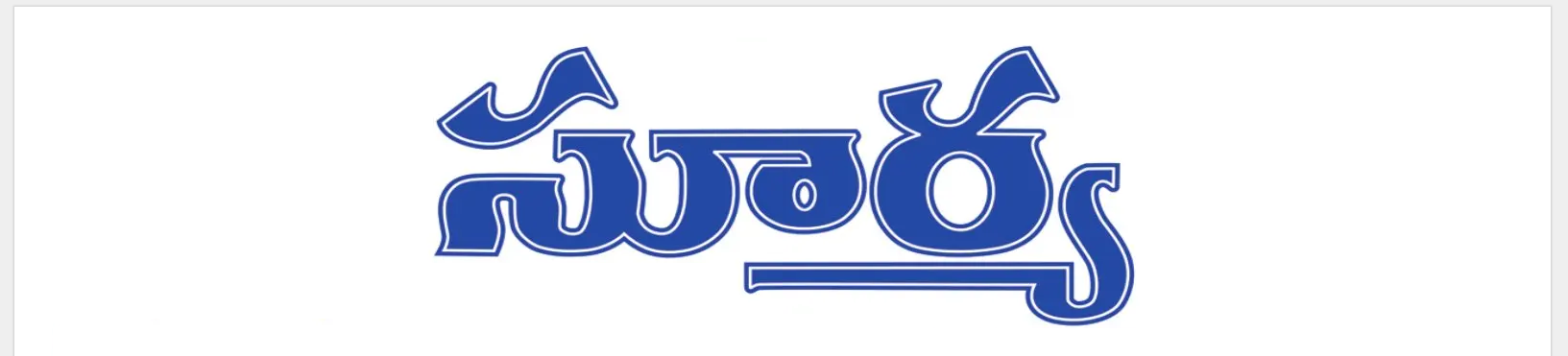
- Type: Daily newspaper
- Owner: Nukarapu Surya Prakash Rao
- Founder: Nukarapu Surya Prakash Rao
- Publisher: SPR Private Publications Ltd.
- Editor: Nukarapu Padmaja
- Founded: 2007
- Political alignment: Centre-Left
- Language: Telugu, English
- Headquarters: Hyderabad, India
- Website: suryaa.com

Suryaa is a Telugu-language newspaper headquartered in Hyderabad. Its editor-in-chief is Nukarapu Surya Prakash Rao. It is published from seventeen cities in India.
