= Andhra Bhoomi =

Indian newspaper

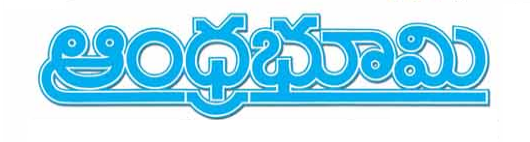
- Type: Daily newspaper
- Format: Broadsheet
- Owner: Deccan Chronicle Holdings Limited
- Founded: 1960
- Ceased publication: 2020
- Language: Telugu
- Headquarters: 36, Sarojini Devi Road, Secunderabad, Telangana, India
- Sister newspapers: Deccan Chronicle
- Website: andhrabhoomi.net

Andhra Bhoomi was a Telugu-language daily newspaper in India, primarily serving the states of Andhra Pradesh and Telangana. Established in 1960, it was owned by Deccan Chronicle Holdings Limited (DCHL), which also publishes the English-language daily Deccan Chronicle. In 2020, Andhra Bhoomi suspended publication, and in 2021, DCHL confirmed its permanent closure.

== History ==
Andhra Bhoomi was founded in 1960 by proprietors of Deccan Chronicle. It was initially edited by Govinduni Rama Sastri (Gora Sastri). It was owned by Deccan Chronicle Holdings Limited.

== Overview ==
In addition to the daily newspaper, Andhra Bhoomi included a weekly magazine titled Andhra Bhoomi Sachitra Vaara Patrika. With a circulation of approximately 365,794, it operated editions from major cities such as Hyderabad, Vijayawada, Visakhapatnam, Rajamahendravaram, Anantapur, Karimnagar, and Nellore, as well as a presence in Bangalore.

== Closure ==
In 2020, Andhra Bhoomi halted publication due to financial issues, but its management did not formally release employees, leaving them hopeful for a possible revival. In March 2021, Deccan Chronicle Holdings Limited (DCHL) confirmed the newspaper's permanent closure, citing an inability to pay outstanding wages. Many employees, unpaid for months, also discovered that their income tax deductions had not been remitted, resulting in tax notices. The affected staff sought help from the Telangana State Human Rights Commission, which issued a notice to DCHL, requesting a response within two weeks.
