= Prajasakti =

Indian Telugu-language daily newspaper

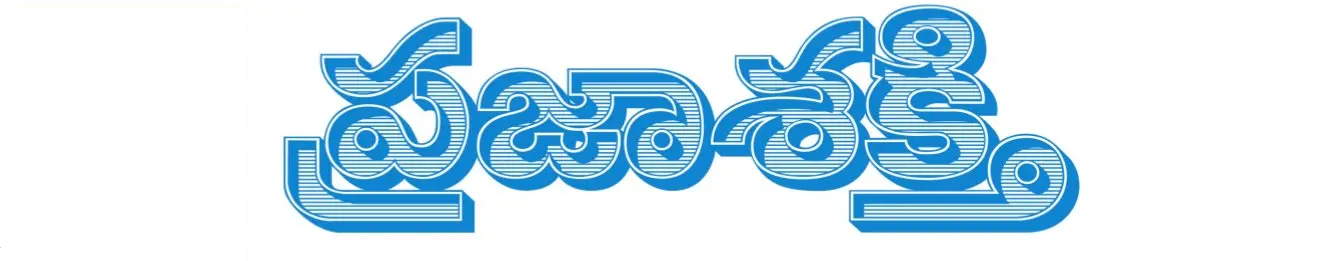
- Type: Daily newspaper
- Format: Broadsheet
- Owner: Communist Party of India (Marxist)
- Publisher: Prajasakti Printers & Publishers Private Ltd.
- Editor: Mallajosyula Venkata Subrahmanya Sarma (Bendi.Tulasidas
- Founded: 1942
- Language: Telugu
- Website: prajasakti.com

Prajasakti (also spelled Prajashakti) is a Telugu-language daily newspaper published from multiple centres in the Indian states of Andhra Pradesh and Telangana. It is owned by the Communist Party of India (Marxist).

== History ==
According to the paper, Prajasakti was established in 1942 and began daily publication in 1945. It was banned in 1948 during the late British Raj period.

The paper returned as a weekly in 1969 and relaunched as a daily in 1981 with Vijayawada as the edition centre.

Subsequent editions were launched from several cities, including Hyderabad, Visakhapatnam, Tirupati, Kurnool, Rajamahendravaram, Srikakulam and Ongole.

== Organisation ==
Prajasakti is published by Prajasakti Printers & Publishers Private Ltd. The editor is Mallajosyula Venkata Subrahmanya Sarma.
