= Press Registrar General of India =

Registrar of newspapers and periodicals in India

- Abbreviation: PRGI
- Predecessor: Registrar of Newspapers for India
- Formation: 1 July 1956; 70 years ago
- Type: Statutory body
- Purpose: Registration of newspapers and periodicals
- Headquarters: Soochna Bhawan, New Delhi
- Coordinates: 28.59396°N 77.23056°E
- Region served: India
- Services: Registration of publications
- Press Registrar General & Head of the Department: Bhupendra Kainthola
- Deputy Press Registrar: Rajith Chandran M. R. Ashutosh Mohle
- Parent organization: Ministry of Information and Broadcasting
- Website: prgi.gov.in

The Press Registrar General of India (PRGI), formerly the Registrar of Newspapers for India (RNI), is a statutory body under the Ministry of Information and Broadcasting, Government of India, for the registration of newspapers and periodicals. It was established in 1956 by amending the Press and Registration of Books Act 1867. However, in 2024, the Act was repealed and replaced by the Press & Registration of Periodicals Act, 2023. PRGI is headquartered in New Delhi.

== History ==
It was established on 1 July 1956, on the recommendation of the First Press Commission in 1953 and by amending the Press and Registration of Books Act 1867. RNI regulates and monitors printing and publication of newspapers based on the Press and Registration of Books Act, 1867 and the Registration of Newspapers (Central) Rules, 1956.

The Press and Registration of Books Act contains the duties and functions of the RNI. On account of some more responsibilities entrusted upon RNI during all these years, the office is performing both statutory as well as some non-statutory functions. Online registration system was formally inaugurated in 2004 by the Information and Broadcasting Minister S. Jaipal Reddy. The Press and Registration of Periodicals Act, 2023 was enacted on 28 December 2023 and the name of the office was changed to the present one.

== Duties ==
Under statutory functions, RNI performs the following duties

- Compilation and maintenance of a Register of Newspapers containing particulars about all the newspapers published;
- Issue of Certificate of Registration to newspapers published under valid declaration;
- Scrutiny and analysis of annual statements sent by the publishers of newspapers every year under PRB Act containing information on circulation, ownership etc.;
- Informing district magistrates about availability of titles, to intending publishers for filing declaration;
- Ensuring that newspapers are published in accordance with the provisions of PRB Act 1867 and the rules made thereunder;
- Verification under Section 19-F of PRB Act, of circulation claims furnished by the publishers in their Annual Statements; and
- Preparation and submission to the Government on or before 31 December each year, a report containing all available information and statistics about the press in India with particular reference to the emerging trends in circulation and in the direction of common ownership units etc.

The following fall under the non-statutory functions:

- Formulation of Newsprint Allocation Policy – Guidelines and issue of Eligibility Certificate to the newspapers to enable them to import newsprint and to procure indigenous newsprint;
- Assessing and certifying the essential need and requirement of newspaper establishments to import printing and composing machinery and allied materials.

== Registration ==
Registrar maintains the legal procedures for registering a newspaper, which can be summarised as:

1. As a first stage, the applicant applies for title verification of the publication to the jurisdictional District Magistrate. The District Magistrate will get the title verified from RNI.
2. After receiving the title verification letter from RNI, the applicant needs to file a declaration for authentication before District Magistrate.
3. After authentication, the newspaper must be published within 6 weeks if it is published once a week or oftener than that. In case of any other periodicity, the first issue should be published within 3 months from the date of authentication.
4. After the first issue is published, the applicant needs to file an application for RNI registration, enclosing the following documents
  1. Title verification letter
  2. Authenticated declaration
  3. An affidavit for no foreign tie-up
  4. First issue and latest issue of the publication
  5. Content intimation/ confirmation in the prescribed form
  6. Certificate intimating appointment of the printer

== Registration of Publication ==
- All publications of India as well as publication imported in India for sales require the mandatory registration with RNI. They are also required to submit their annual report on circulation numbers.
- As of 31 March 2018, there are 17,573 newspapers and 100,666 periodicals registered with RNI.

== See also ==
- List of newspapers in India
- Media of India
