= Kadhaprasangam =

Performing art of Kerala, India

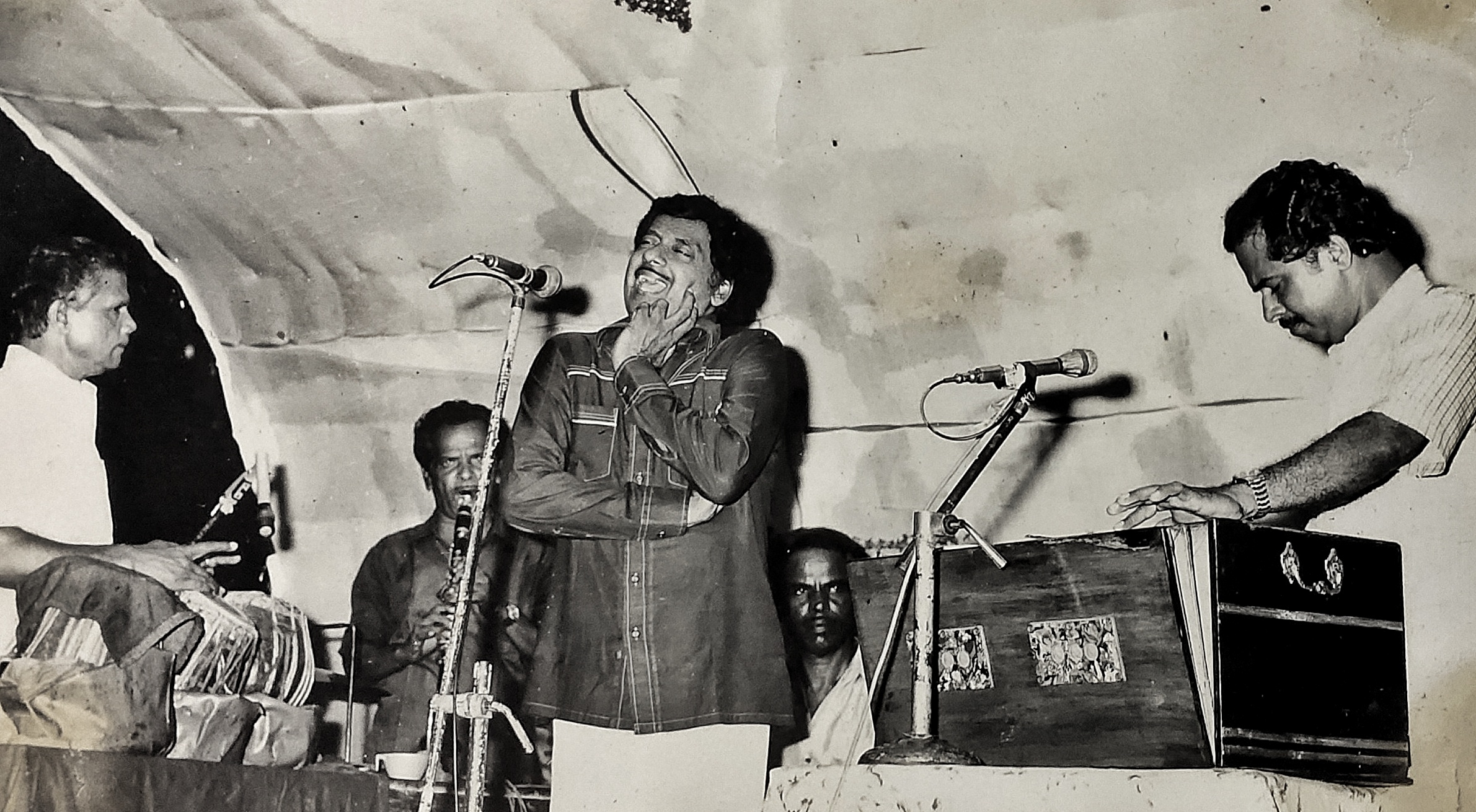
V. Sambasivan performing kadhaprasangam

Kadhaprasangam (lyrical narrative or story telling performance) is a performing art of Kerala, India.

== Performance ==
It combines speaking, acting, and singing to present a story. Costumes, make-up, or settings are not used. The main artist, the Kaadhikan, tells the story, acts and sings with two or three accompanying instrumentalists. A performance typically lasts 2 1/2 to 3 hours.

== History ==
It originated from an earlier art form Harikathakalakshepam which used similar techniques, but differed in theme and style. While Harikadhakalakshepam was based on themes from puranas and epics, Kadhaprasangam received themes largely from classical and popular literature.

Kadhaprasangam's heyday was in the second half of the 20th century, attracting crowds on temple grounds in the festival season. It spread beyond temple grounds as a popular presentation viz. 'Kadhaprasangam' by Swami Sathyadevan. The Govt of India honoured Swami Sathyadevan with a pension awarded to founders of art forms while the Swami was in Banaras in 1961.

Its chief and later exponents were Swami Brahmavruthan, M. P. Manmadhan, K. K. Vadhyar, P. C. Abraham, Joseph Kaimaparamban, V. Sambasivan, Kedamangalam Sadanandan, Ayilam Unnikrishnan, Kadavoor Balan, Dr. Kadavoor Sivadasan, Ayisha Beevi, Kollam Babu, Mavelikara S.S.Unnithan, V. Harsha Kumar, Kallada V. V. Kutty, Paravur Sukumaran, V. D. Rajappan, Vatakara V Asokan, Dr. Vasanthakumar Sambasivan, Nadakkal Ashokkumar, V V Jose Kallada, Gopika Vazhuthacaud and others. They contributed to Kerala's social and educational renaissance. Nadakkal Ashokkumar performed Kadhaprasangam in Temples, Cultural organisations, All India radio and Dooradarsan. He performed Shakespeare's Hamlet and Mahabharatha stories.

== Source material ==
The scripts can be original works written for the performance or adaptations of stories from epics, classical, or modern literature. William Shakespeare's Othello, Leo Tolstoy's Anna Karenina, Kumaran Asan's Karuna, Vallathol Narayana Menon’s Magdalana Mariyam, Changampuzha Krishna Pillai's Ramanan, Thirunalloor Karunakaran's Rani and Vayalar Ramavarma's Aaayisha were some of the literary classics thus successfully adapted for Kadhaprasangam.
