= Veena Poovu =

Veena Poovu can refer to:

- "Veena Poovu" (poem), a 1907 Malayalam poem by Indian poet Kumaran Asan
