= Edappally Raghavan Pillai =

Indian poet (1909-1936)

- Born: 30 May 1909; Edapally, Kingdom of Cochin, British India
- Died: 4 July 1936 (aged 27); Kollam, Kerala, India
- Occupations: Poet, writer
- Relatives: Pavathu Neelakanda Pillai (father); Kalyani Amma (mother)
- Writing career
- Notable works: Maninadam; Thushara Haram; Hrudaya Smitham

Edappally Raghavan Pillai (30 May 1909 – 4 July 1936) was an Indian poet of Malayalam literature and a close associate of Changampuzha Krishna Pillai. The pair, the front-runners of romanticism in Malayalam, was considered by many as the Shelley and Keats combination of Malayalam poetry. Kesari Balakrishna Pillai compared Pillai to the Italian poet, Giacomo Leopardi.

== Biography ==
St. Albert's High School, Pillai's alma mater

Raghavan Pillai was born on 30 May 1909, at Elamakkara, near Edapally in Ernakulam district of the south Indian state of Kerala to Pavathu Neelakanda Pillai and Kalyani Amma, in a family with limited financial means. His mother died when he was young and his father, who was an alcoholic, remarried; he could not get along well with his step mother. His early schooling was at a local school in Ponekkara after which he completed middle school from the English School in Edapally Chuttupadukara before completing his high school education from a school in Cheranellore and later at St. Albert's HSS, Ernakulam; he passed the 10th standard examination only on the second attempt. During this period, he worked as a private tuition teacher and he fell in love with one of his students who came from a rich family in Edapally. The girl's parents discover it and forced him to leave Edapally.

Pillai moved to Thiruvananthapuram where he stayed with a friend by name M. Balakrishnan Nair and worked at various establishments viz. Bhashabhivardhini Book Depot, Sreemathi weekly and Kerala Kesari magazine as well as at a local grocery shop as their accountant. He also tried unsuccessfully to pass Vidwan examination. When Kerala Kesari was closed down, he moved to Kollam where he was accommodated by V. M. Narayana Pillai, a known lawyer and a relative of the girl he loved. It was here he learned about the marriage of the girl when the lawyer received her wedding invitation. On 4 July 1936, when the lawyer was away from home to attend the girl's wedding, Pillai, aged 27, bathed himself clean and wore a jasmine garland before killing himself. His body was found the next morning, hanging from a tree.

== Legacy ==
Raghavan Pillai was a close friend of Changampuzha Krishna Pillai and the friends were referred to as Edapally poets or as the twins of Edapally. Both the poets were exponents of romantic poetry which earned them the epithet, Shelley and Keats combination of Malayalam poetry. It is believed that the pastoral play, Ramanan, by Changampuzha is an elegy based on the life and death of his friend Raghavan Pillai.

Kesari Balakrishna Pillai likened Pillai to the Italian poet, Giacomo Leopardi. Pillai's body of work comprises Sudha, Chillikkashu, Thushara Haaram (1935), Nava Saurabham (1936), Hridhaya Smitham (1936) and Maninaadham (1944), the last one considered by many as his best work. Ramanan has since been adapted as a feature film, into a Kadhaprasangam by Kedamangalam Sadanandan and into a music album. A memorial was built at Mulamkadakam in Kollam, the place where Pillai killed himself.

== Farewell poem ==
Pillai wrote a poem, Naalathe Prabhatham (Tomorrow's Sunrise), the day before his death and sent it to Malayalarajyam press with instructions to publish it the next day. Maninadam, The poem he wrote shortly before his death opens as:

മണിമുഴക്കം! മരണദിനത്തിന്റെ
മണിമുഴക്കം, മധുരം! വരുന്നു ഞാന്‍!
അനുനയിക്കുവാനെത്തുമെന്‍കൂട്ടരോ-
ടരുളീടട്ടെയെന്നന്ത്യയാത്രാമൊഴി

Translation:

The bell tolls; It is the sweet knell
Of the day of the death; I am coming;
Let me say my farewell words
To the friends who come to see me off.

Changampuzha wrote a short poem, The Broken Flute, mourning the loss of his friend which reads as:

നീലക്കുയിലെ, നിരാശ്രയാം നിൻ നീറും മനസ്സുമായ് നീ മറഞ്ഞു
കേൾക്കുകയില്ലിനിമേൽ നിന്റെ നേർത്തുനേർത്തുള്ള കളകളങ്ങൾ
ഇന്നോളമീ മലർത്തോപ്പിൽ നമ്മളൊന്നിച്ചു ചേർന്ന് പറന്നു പാടി
ഇന്നിളമെന്നെ തനിച്ചുവിട്ടിട്ടെങ്ങുനീ അയ്യോ പറന്നൊളിച്ചു?

Translation:

O blessed nightingale You have vanished with your scourging despair
Your songs of melancholy sweetness Alas! will not be heard again
Were we not like two chirping little birds singing in tuneful harmony?
Where have you gone leaving me all alone?

== Selected works ==
- Thushara Haaram (1935)
- Nava Saurabham (1936)
- Hridhaya Smitham (1936)
- Maninaadham (1944)
- Edappally Raghavan Pillayude Krithikal
