= S Rahul =

Malayalam Poet and writer

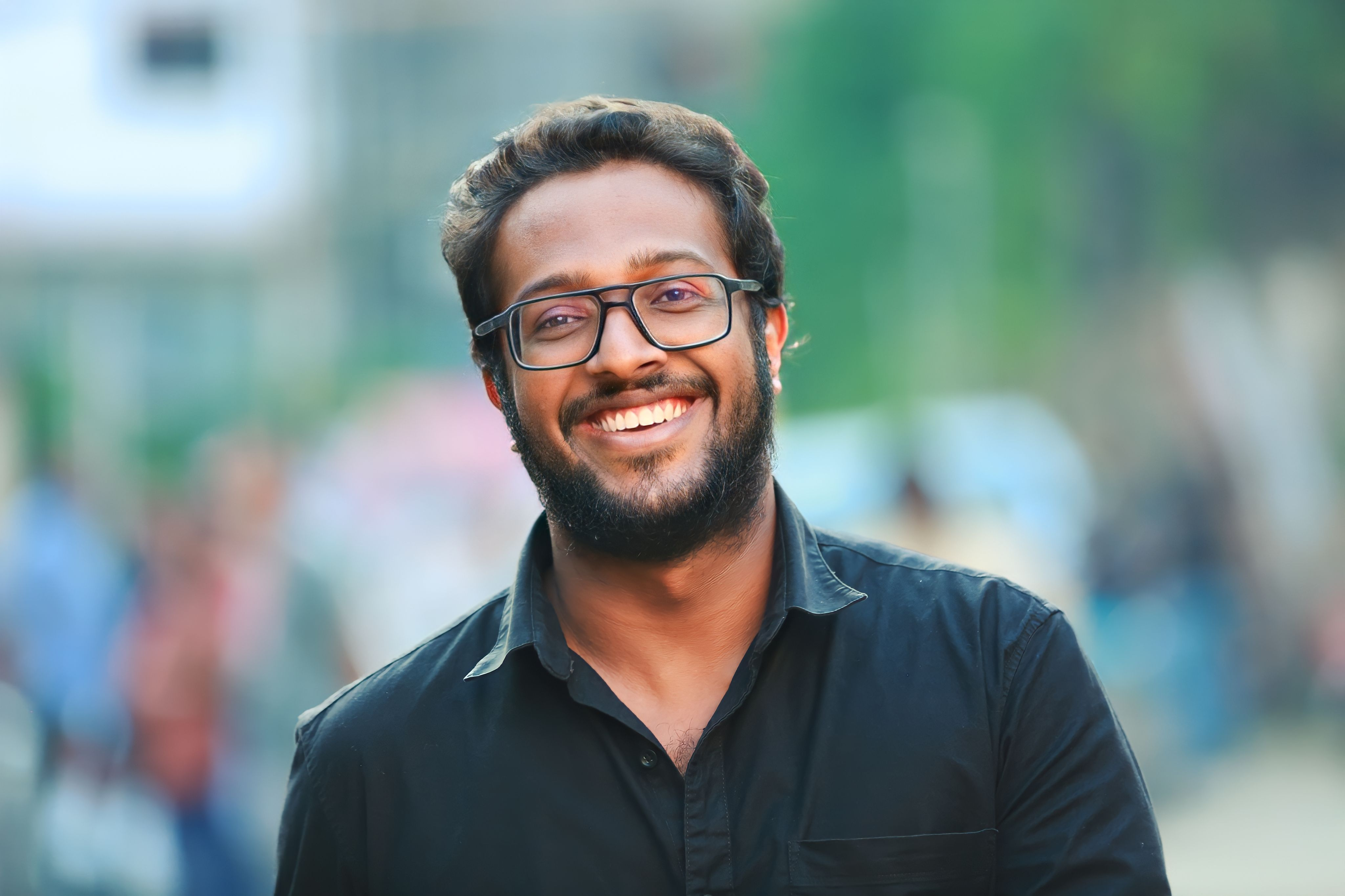
- Occupation: Poet
- Writing career
- Language: Malayalam
- Notable awards: K V Anoop Memorial Literature Award; Thirunalloor Karunakaran Poetry Award; Yuvadhara Literary Award

S Rahul (born in Kattakada, Trivandrum, Kerala) is a poet and writer in Malayalam. His poems and articles have been published in many periodicals. He has also translated many poems and literary works. He is an active social activist and orator. He is currently the District Secretary of cultural organization Purogamana Kala Sahitya Sangham. He was the Executive Editor of Festival Handbook and Daily Bulletin at International Film Festival of Kerala(IFFK).

== Career as Writer ==
S Rahul won three times Best Poet Award from Kerala University. He was a recipient of K V Anoop Memorial Literature Award in 2019 and Thirunalloor Karunakaran Poetry Award in 2018. He also received Loka Kerala Sabha Poetry Prize for Best Malayalam Poetry. He won the Special Jury Award in Yuvadhara Literature Award 2022.

== Literary works ==
- Mody Sarkar Vagdhanangalm Yadarthyavum ( മോഡി സർക്കാർ വാഗ്ദാനങ്ങളും യാഥാർത്ഥ്യവും) - Translated
- P Biju - Porattathinte Manifesto (പി ബിജു : പോരാട്ടത്തിന്റെ മാനിഫെസ്റ്റോ) - Edited

== Awards ==
- K V Anoop Memorial Literature Award
- Thirunalloor Karunakaran Poetry Award
- Best Poet Award from Kerala University Youth Festival
- ONV Memorial Endowment for Best Poet
- Loka Kerala Sabha Poetry Prize for Malayalam Poetry Writing
- Yuvadhara Literary Award
