= Ramanan (disambiguation) =

Ramanan may mean:

- Ramanan (play in verse), a legendary Malayalam poem by Changampuzha Krishna Pillai, which was the most celebrated poem in Kerala for a generation
- Ramanan (film), a 1967 film adaptation of the poem
- S. Ramanan, a mathematician from India specializing in algebraic geometry
- A. V. Ramanan, a Tamil T. V. host
