= Abhisar (poem) =

Abhisar (অভিসার; transl. Rendezvous) is a Bengali poem by Rabindranath Tagore about the courtesan Vasavadatta and the Buddhist monk Upagupta. Tagore translated the poem into English for his poetry anthology titled Fruit-Gathering (1916).

The poem explores themes of spiritual rebirth alongside love and was influenced by The Lady of Shalott (1831) by Alfred Lord Tennyson. The work has been adapted into dance and performed multiple times, including by the Bengali Kathak dancer Keka Sinha who performed Basabdatta, an adaptation of Tagore’s poem named after its heroine.

== See also ==
- Upagupta
- Karuna
