= Pallamkuzhi =

- Directed by: M. N. Sreedharan
- Written by: Ettumanoor Sreekumar
- Screenplay by: Ettumanoor Sreekumar
- Produced by: B. Harikumar & Gopalakrishnan
- Starring: Roopa; V. Sambasivan; S. P. Pillai; Alummoodan
- Cinematography: Kannan Narayanan
- Edited by: Ramesh
- Music by: K. Raghavan; V. Sambasivan
- Production company: Vishnu Films
- Distributed by: Indubaala Combines
- Release date: 18 February 1983
- Country: India
- Language: Malayalam

Pallamkuzhi is a 1983 Indian Malayalam-language film, directed and produced by M. N. Sreedharan. The film stars Roopa, V. Sambasivan and Alummoodan. The film has musical score by K. Raghavan and V. Sambasivan.

== Plot ==
Hemachandran, a writer, narrates his life journey at a felicitation event and recounts how the death of his role model, Yetheendran, changed his life forever.

== Cast ==
- Roopa as Devu
- V. Sambasivan as Hemachandran
- N.G Rajendra Das as Yatheendran
- Alummoodan as Madhavan
- Jagannatha Varma as Karthavu
- Nellikode Bhaskaran as Raman Nair
- Philomina
- S. P. Pillai

== Soundtrack ==
The music was composed by K. Raghavan and V. Sambasivan with lyrics by V. Sambasivan and Ettumanoor Sreekumar.

No.	Song	Singers	Lyrics	Length (m:ss)
1	"Aaaraadhakar"	V. Sambasivan	V. Sambasivan	
2	"Apsarasaanente"	V. Sambasivan	V. Sambasivan	
3	"En Thanuvum"	V. Sambasivan	V. Sambasivan	
4	"Ennakkaruppulla"	V. Sambasivan	V. Sambasivan	
5	"Ethu Naattilaano"	K. J. Yesudas, S. Janaki	Ettumanoor Sreekumar	
6	"Kadutha Jeevitham"	V. Sambasivan	V. Sambasivan	
7	"Karayoo Nee Karayoo"	K. J. Yesudas	Ettumanoor Sreekumar	
8	"Kavarnneduthuvo"	V. Sambasivan	V. Sambasivan	
9	"Maattuvin Chattangale"	V. Sambasivan	V. Sambasivan	
10	"Sahapravarthakayo"	V. Sambasivan	V. Sambasivan	
11	"Shaanthaakaaram"	Venmani Vijayakumar	Ettumanoor Sreekumar	
12	"Thampuraanaayoru"	V. Sambasivan	V. Sambasivan	
13	"Thankakkinaavukalum"	K. J. Yesudas	Ettumanoor Sreekumar	
14	"Vilaykku Vaangaam"	V. Sambasivan	V. Sambasivan	
