= Sambasivan =

Sambasivan is a surname. Notable people with the surname include:

- M. S. Swaminathan (born Monkombu Sambasivan Swaminathan; 1925–2023), Indian agronomist, agricultural scientist, geneticist, administrator and humanitarian
- V. Sambasivan (1929–1996), Indian artist
