= Rani (poem) =

Malayalam poem

"Rani" is a popular narrative poem in Malayalam written by Thirunalloor Karunakaran (1924–2006).

It was first published in 1955 in the Onam special number of Kerala Kaumudi. Composed in the Dravida metre in mellifluent language with a dramatic plot and true-to-life characters it was an instant hit with readers. It was brought out in book form in 1957 and was well received by readers.

The theme of the poem is the struggle of two poor working class lovers – Rani and Nanu – living on the shores of the Ashtamudi lake – for realising their dream of a better life. The popularity of the poem attracted Kadhaprasangam and Vilupattu artistes who presented it successfully on many stages. In 2005, the twenty fifth edition of the poem was brought out as the Golden jubilee edition.
