= Changampuzha Park =

Urban park in Kochi

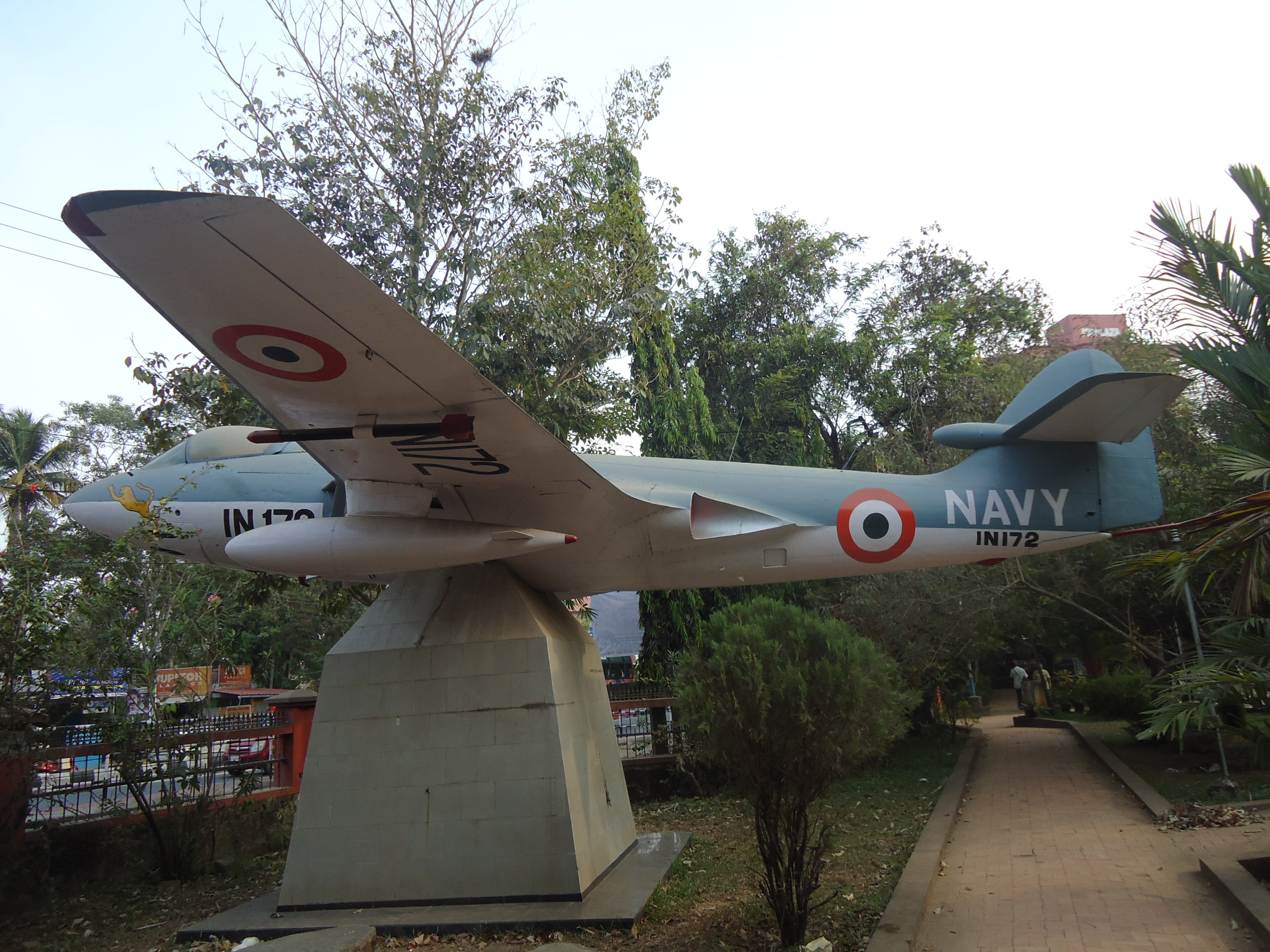
- The Sea Hawk IN-172 fighter aircraft displayed at the park

- Location within Kochi
- Type: Urban park
- Location: Edapally, Kochi, India
- Coordinates: 10.0164771°N 76.2998402°E
- Area: 2 acres (0.0081 km^{2})
- Established: 1977
- Website: Changampuzha Park

Changampuzha Park is a recreational park and a venue for various cultural activities in the city of Kochi, Kerala, India. Established in 1977, the park is situated at Edapally, the birthplace of the great poet Changampuzha Krishna Pillai, on the side of the National Highway leading to Aluva. The park is popular among children, elderly persons and others. It serves as a venue for several art and cultural programmes of importance. The park is maintained by Greater Cochin Development Authority, and houses the Changampuzha Samskarika Kendram (Changampuzha Cultural Society). The park serves as a live monument to the evergreen romantic Malayalam poet, Changampuzha Krishna Pillai and houses a statue of the great poet.

== History ==
The foundation stone for the Changampuzha Memorial Art centre was laid by the then Chief Minister of Kerala, C. Achutha Menon. However, until the formation of the Changampuzha Samskarika Kendram, the park was often home to anti-social elements of the city. However, with the establishment of CSK, things started to change. In 2001-2002, the Executive Committee of the Kendram decided to conduct a workshop of veterans in the fields of various channels of art worldwide and present with their participation manifold cultural programmes in the Park, extending over an uninterrupted period of three weeks. This multi dimensional exercise named "Viswa Kala Sangamam". This was an astounding success, and the organization started to conduct events on a regular basis. The significant events held over the years are documented on its web site .

== Details ==
The Park has a platform which measures 40 feet X 40 feet, opposite to the old platform which was much smaller. This platform serves as an open-air auditorium for various performances including Kathakali, traditional theatre, realistic drama etc. The park has a children's play area which has seesaws, slides, swing and a merry-go-round. There are two circular rooms in the park which serve as recreation rooms, of which one is used for playing chess and carroms and houses a television and radio. A real IN172 aeroplane stands proudly at one end of the park, facing the national highway. Works of art, created during sculpture camps held in the park have been installed in the park.

The Changampuzha Park station of the Kochi Metro is situated right in front of the park.

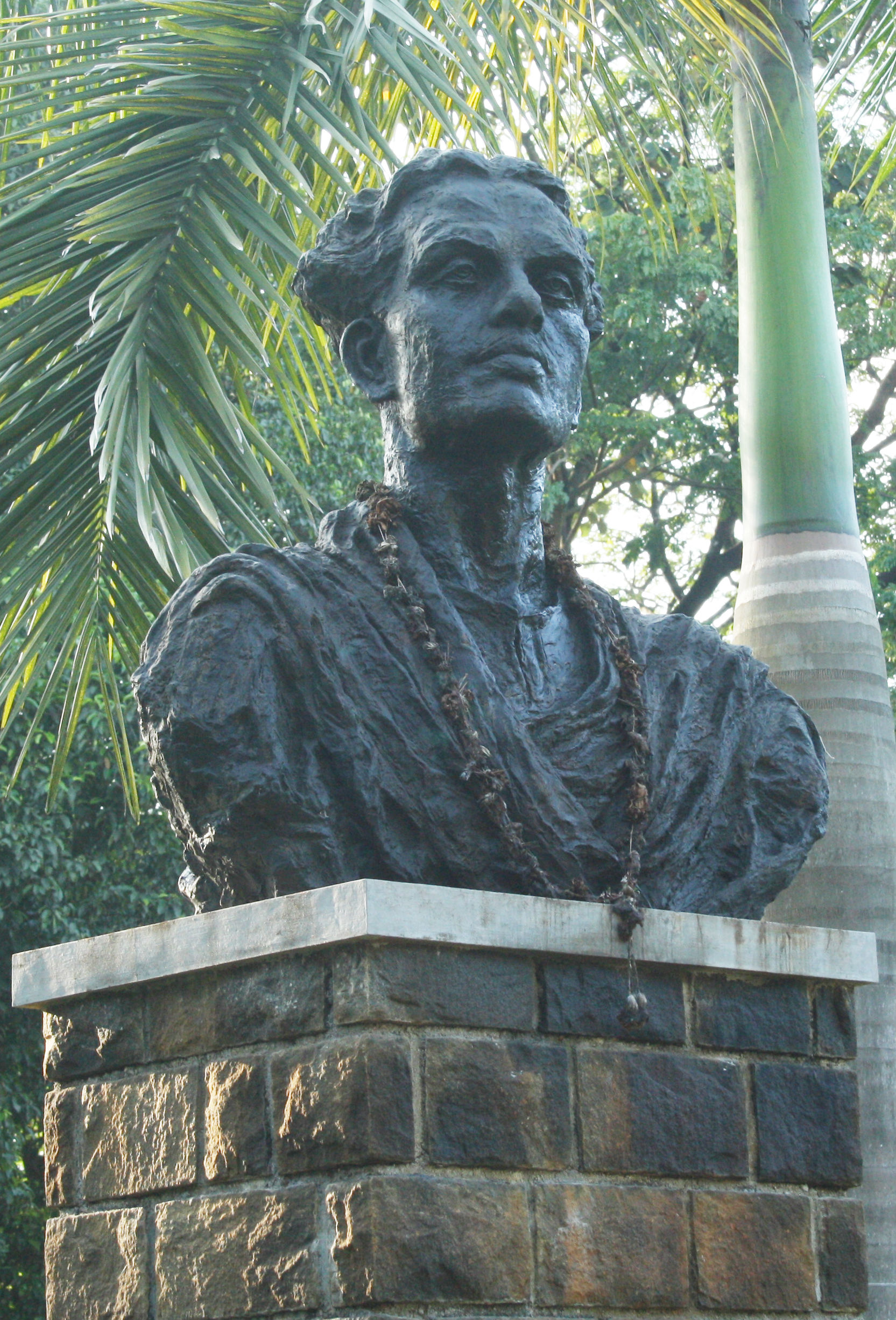
Statue of Changampuzha inside the park

== Major Recurring Activities in the Park ==
The contents in this section have been obtained from information in

Edappally Sangeetha Sadas formed on 15 November 2004 conducts classical music concerts every month, besides 9 day Navarathri festival and 8 day annual music festival. Thyagaraja Aradhana, Muthuswami Dikshithar Day, Swathi Thirunal Day and Muthaiaha Bhagavathar Day are also observed every year.

Edappally Kathakali Aswadaka Sadas founded in 2003 for promoting and popularising Kathakali conducts Kathakali every month besides its 3 Day Annual Kathakali Festival in January.

Edappally Senior Citizen's Forum is also very active with weekly meetings on every Tuesday evening (Aazhchaavattom) and birthday celebrations of its members.

Kavyamoola: held on the second Sunday of every month starting at 1600 hours. During this event, budding young poets present poems composed by themselves. The fourth anniversary of Kavyamoola was celebrated in 2006. During this event, noted Kathakali artist and poet, Kalamandalam Keshavan was all praise for the young poets who regularly turn up at Kavyamoola and their works.

Akshara Sloka Sadas: This event, which is held on the fourth Sunday of every month starting at 1400 hours usually attracts at least 35 experts in who engage in Aksharaslokam recitals. On an annual basis, Akshara Sloka competitions are held for school students.

Malayalam Day Celebrations: On 1 November every year (the day of the formation of the state of Kerala), a public meeting of eminent people in Malayalam literature is held followed by recital of poems and Thiruvathirakali.
