= Thirunalloor Karunakaran =

Indian writer (1924–2006)

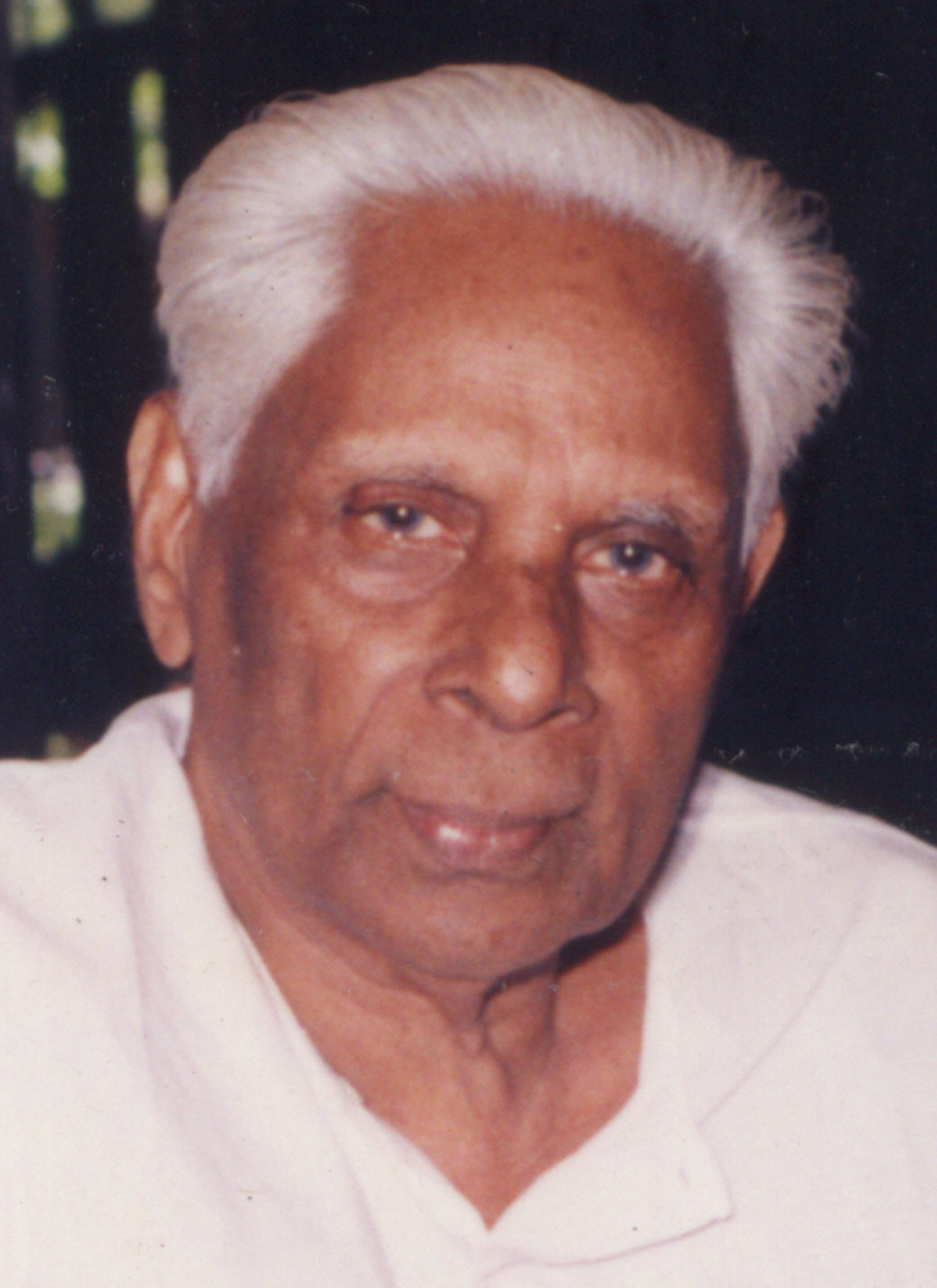
- Thirunalloor Karunakaran
- Born: 8 October 1924; Kollam, Kerala, India
- Died: 5 July 2006 (aged 81); Kollam, Kerala, India
- Occupation: Poet

Thirunalloor Karunakaran (8 October 1924 – 5 July 2006) was a poet, scholar, teacher and leftist intellectual of Kerala, India.

== Biography ==
=== Early life ===
Thirunalloor (variously spelled in English as Thirunelloor, Thirunellur and Thirunallur) Karunakaran (Note: "Thirunalloor" is his family name, and "Karunakaran" is his given name) was born in the village of Perinad in Kollam (Quilon) district in Kerala to P. K. Padmanabhan and N. Lakshmy. He started learning Sanskrit in the traditional way before joining primary school and he associated with the working-class political movement early in his life. He published his first book, the Malayalam translation of a poem by Oliver Goldsmith, while in school. He wrote several poems while he was a student, as well as lyrics and articles in various periodicals. He made his mark during the Pink Decade in Malayalam poetry. By the time he began college, his close contacts with Communist leaders like R. Sugathan and M. N. Govindan Nair made him a staunch sympathiser of the Communist Party of India.

=== Career ===
After earning his Bachelor of Arts degree in history from S. N. College in Kollam, he worked as a tutor there for a brief period. Soon he joined a University college in Trivandrum for post-graduate studies in Malayalam, where he completed some advanced study of Kerala history under Elamkulam Kunjan Pillai, a historian and scholar who was a major influence on Thirunalloor's intellectual life After completing his Master of Arts in Malayalam, he joined the government service as a college lecturer and taught at Government Arts College and University College. He served as a member of the Kerala Public Service Commission for 6 years. Later, he worked as the editor of Janayugam, a weekly cultural magazine of the Communist Party of India. In 1973, he visited the Soviet Union as a member of the delegation of Indian writers who participated in the Afro-Asian Writers Conference held in Kazakhstan.

Awards conferred on him include the Asan Award (1984), Vayalar Award (1988), Muloor Award (1992), Abudabi Shakthi Award, and the Kerala Sahitya Academy Award for lifetime contributions (2000).

=== Final years ===
Though he lived in the city of Trivandrum for more than three decades, Thirunalloor chose to spend the rest of his life in his native village of Perinad on the banks of Ashtamudi lake, which had been a constant source of inspiration for his poetry. He died on 5 July 2006 at his residence in Quilon. He was buried without any customary religious rites or ceremonies, as he had wished. During his final years, he was engaged in writing a long poem titled 'Seetha' (Sita), reinterpreting the Ramayana legend

Painting based on the poem "Rani" by Thirunalloor Karunakaran. Artist:Chirayinkeezhu Sreekantan Nair

A three-day-long cultural festival called 'Thirunalloor Kavyolsavam' is held every year from 1 May (International Workers' Day) on the banks of the Ashtamudi lake in Quilon to perpetuate his memory.

== Writings and philosophy ==
Having studied Marxism and Indian philosophy in depth, Thirunalloor, worked to combine the best aspects of both; this vision is a central theme in all of his poems. In many of his poems, he depicts the physical and spiritual experience of collective human labour as a creative process of self-assertion and the self-emancipation of mankind. Tharisu nilangalilekku (To the barren fields), Parayudappukar(The Granite crushers), Adyathe Theevandi (The First Train), and Kayamkulam Kayal(Kayamkulam Lake) all bear the stamp of this vision.

The Ashtamudi lake and life on its shores was a key source of inspiration for his writings, and his poetry abounds with varied themes, characters, and imagery taken from this environment. He wrote also wrote short lyrics dealing with soft transitory feelings and moods, as well as long narrative poems that contain diverse characters and complex social situations.

Several of his works, like lyrics written for various media and art forms like Kadhaprasangam and stageplays, as well as marching songs, articles, and writings in Sanskrit, are yet to be compiled. This includes the Sanskrit translation of Kumaran Asan's Chandala Bhikshuki and studies in Indian aesthetics.

Thirunalloor was an atheist, who believed that Indian philosophy is essentially materialistic and areligious. He strongly called for a critical evaluation of the Bhagavad Gita and the philosophy of Shankaracharya (Adi Shankara) to expose their darker sides. He said that Shankaracharya was a supporter of the caste system and the Bhagavad Gita was an open sanction of violence.

== Publications ==
=== Poetry and plays ===
- "Samagamam" (Long poem)
- Manjuthullikal (Collection of poems)
- "Premam Madhuramanu Dheeravumanu" (Long narrative poem)
- Soundaryathinte padayalkal (Collection of poems)
- "Rani (Long narrative poem)
- "Rathri" (Long narrative poem)
- Anthi Mayangumbol (Collection of lyrics)
- "Tashkent" (Long narrative poem)
- Thirunalloor Karunakarante Kavithakal (Collection of poems)
- "Vayalar" (Long narrative poem)
- Greeshma sandhyakal (Collection of poems)
- Puthumazha (Collection of poems for children)
- Meghasandesam (Translation of Meghaduta by Kalidasa)
- Omarghayyaminte Gadhakal (Translation of Rubaiyat by Omar Khayyam)
- Gypsikal (Translation of Gypsies by Alexander Pushkin)
- AbhijnanaShakunthalam (Translation of Abhijnanasakuntalam by Kalidasa)

=== Prose ===
- Malayalabhashaparinamam Sidhanthangalum Vasthuthakalum (A study on the origin and evolution of Malayalam language)
- Oru Mahayudhathinte Paryavasanam (The Mahabharata retold through an independent angle)
- Praacheena Bharathathile Bhouthikavaadam (Translation of In Defence of Materialism in Ancient India by Debiprasad Chattopadhyaya)
- Anusmaranangal (Collection of articles)

== See also ==
- Rani (poem)
- Marxist aesthetics
- Malayali
