= Shin Upagutta =

Buddhist arahant

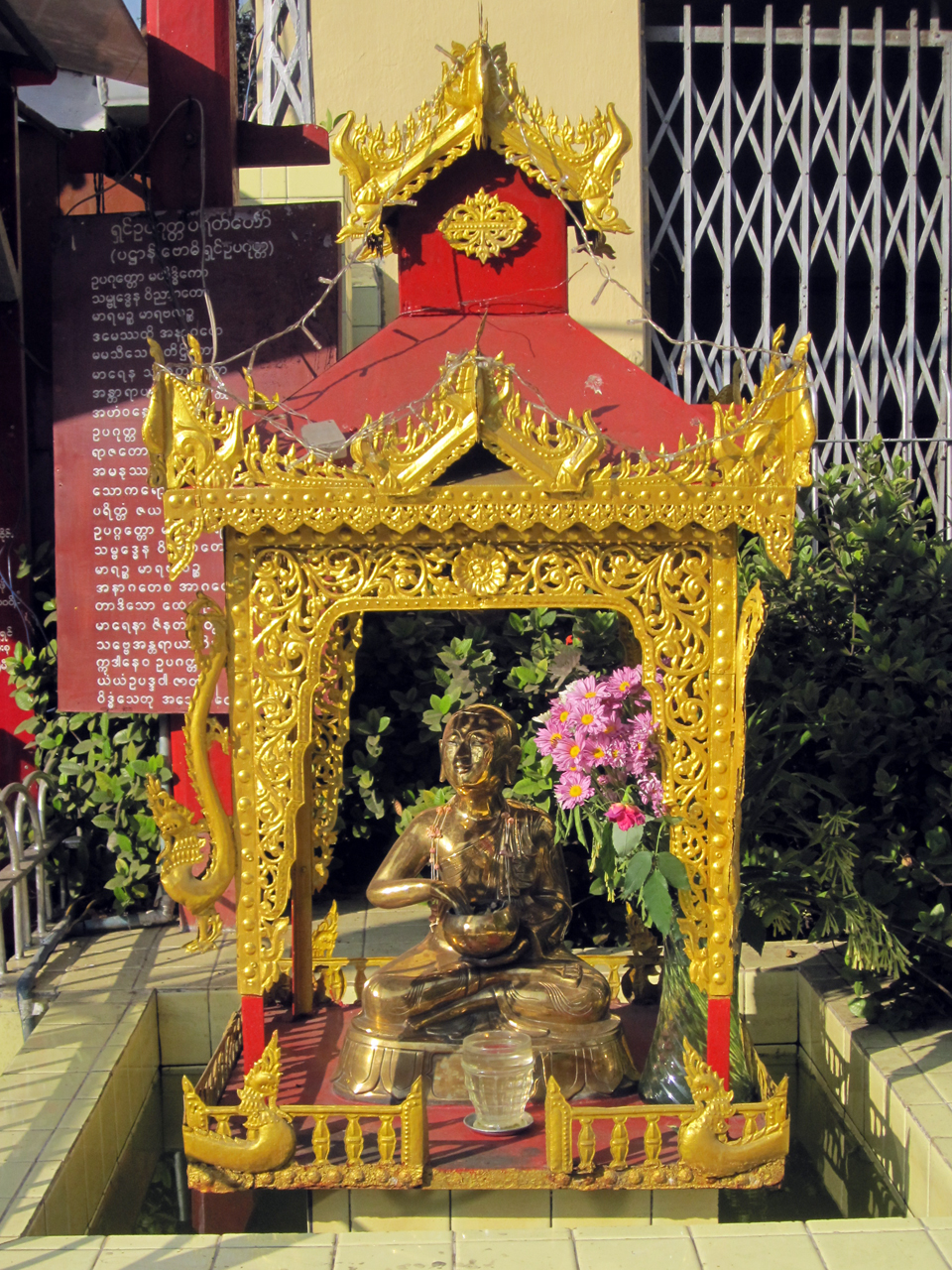
A streetside shrine of Shin Upagutta in downtown Yangon

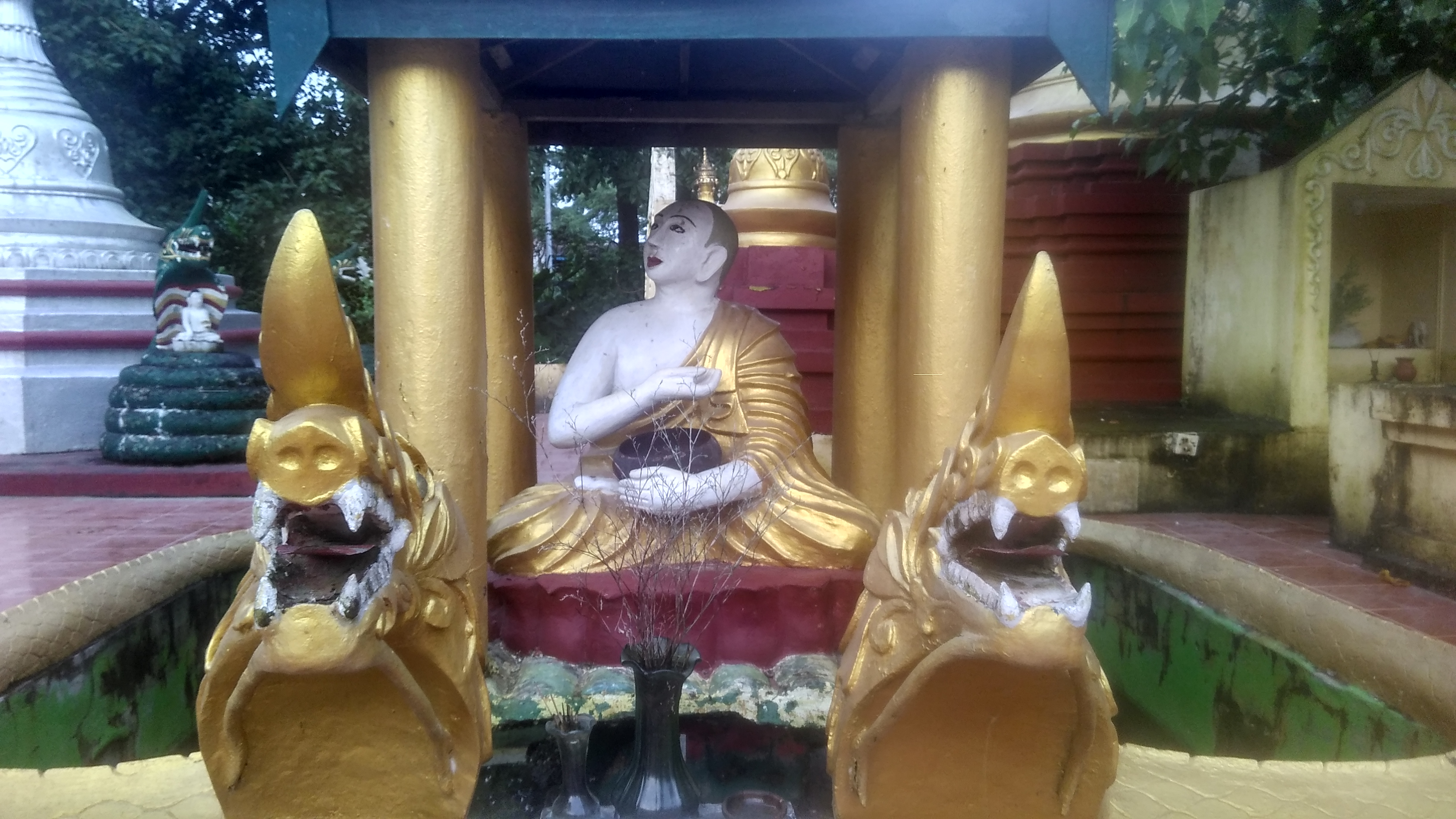
A Shin Upagutta statue

Shin Upagutta (Burmese: ရှင်ဥပဂုတ္တ or ရှင်ဥပဂုတ် [ʃɪ̀ɰ̃ ṵpəɡoʊʔ]; also spelt Shin Upagot, Shin Upagote or Shin U Pagoke) is an arahant commonly venerated by Buddhists in Myanmar. He is believed to protect worshipers from danger, including floods and storms. He is also venerated in Cambodia, Northern Thailand and Laos, where he is known as Upakhut (Thai: อุปคุต; RTGS: Uppakhut).

He is commonly depicted sitting cross-legged, dressed in monk's robes and with a hand tilted into an alms bowl called a thabeik, and is associated with nāga, water serpents. He is believed to be either Moggaliputta-Tissa, a Buddhist monk who presided the Third Buddhist council, Upagupta, a Mahayana arhat, or a creation of Mahayana Buddhism, because he is not described in the Pali Canon and only mentioned in the Burmese historical chronicle Maha Yazawin.

== Biography ==
=== Life before becoming an arhat ===
He was a monk named Eindagotta (ဣန္ဒာဂုတ္တ, Pali: Indāgutta) during Kassapa Buddha's time. He told some fellow monks to leave the monk life and to live a human life again. The Buddha told him that he would become an arhat after 218 years of the death of Gautama Buddha.

In Gautama Buddha's time, he was a non-believer called Sula Thakuladayi (စူဠသကုလဒါယီ, Pali: Cūla Sakuladāyi). He was taught by the Buddha about the concept of saṃsāra. However, he could not become a monk because of the prophecy of Kassapa Buddha.

=== The afterlife ===
In 265 or 182 BCE, Upagutta was born to his mother Missa Dewi (မစ္ဆဒေဝီ, Pali: Macchadevī) and his father Prince Dawtha Kumara (ဒေါသကုမာရ, Pali: Dosakumāra). He was told that he would become a noble person in the future.

Upagutta had a rough personality; he was interested in wild animals and he did not like to learn. A sage named Upa (ဥပ, Upa) taught him about the Buddha's teachings when he was young.

Years later, Upagutta and his mother went back to her father who was king of Yazaka (ရာဇဂြိုဟ်, Pali: Rājagaha). The king wanted Upagutta to become his heir but his mother believed in the prophecy about her son becoming an arhat. Meanwhile, a deva carried Prince Upagutta and went across the ocean. Upagutta began to consider the dhamma taught by Bayathe. Later, he suddenly became an arhat and the angel dropped him. As he was falling down, a bronze palace appeared in the ocean and he started to live there.

Some Burmese believe that Shin Upagutta is still living, in a floating brass palace in the southern ocean, and that he can be invoked through a special Pali incantation, and that his mere invisible presence will prevent storms and floods. Shin Upagutta is commonly venerated by people in the Irrawaddy Delta. A major festival dedicated to Shin Upagutta is in Shwegyin, near Bago, during the Burmese month of Thadingyut. Another, called the Ye Hmyaw Pwe (ရေမျှောပွဲ), is held in Yangon's Chinatown in October and involves a Chinese-style procession and ceremonial dispersal of ashes into the Yangon River.

== See also ==
- Buddhism in Burma
- Burmese pagoda
- Shin Thiwali
- Gadaw
- Thadingyut Festival
- Pagoda festival
- Sand pagoda
