= Upagupta =

A King's guide

- Common representation of Upagupta, Wihan Phra Upakhut (Upagutta Shrine), Wat Bowonniwet, Bangkok, Thailand

Religious life
- Religion: Buddhism
- School: Sarvastivada

Senior posting
- Teacher: Śāṇavāsa

Upagupta (c. 3rd century BCE) was a Buddhist monk, widely venerated in several Buddhist traditions across Asia. According to stories in the Sanskrit text Ashokavadana, he served as the spiritual teacher of the Mauryan emperor Ashoka.

In the Sarvāstivādin tradition, Upagupta is considered the fifth patriarch after Mahākāśyapa, Ānanda, Madhyāntika, and Śāṇakavāsin. In Chan/Zen Buddhism, he is regarded as the fourth patriarch. His teacher was Śāṇavāsa, a direct disciple of Ānanda, who was the Buddha's personal attendant.

Because his name is absent from Theravāda literature, it is generally assumed that Upagupta belonged to the Sarvāstivādin school. Despite this, his legacy has extended across diverse traditions, and in Southeast Asia, particularly in Myanmar, Cambodia, Thailand, Laos, and Bangladesh, he is an important cult figure.

== Veneration in Southeast Asia ==
In Myanmar, Upagupta is venerated under the name Shin Upagutta (Burmese: ရှင်ဥပဂုတ္တ), believed to be an arahant who protects devotees from misfortune, especially natural disasters such as floods and storms. He is a prominent figure in Burmese folk Buddhism and is associated with miraculous legends. In Cambodia, he is known as Preah Uppakut, and in Laos and Northern Thailand, he is called Upakhut (อุปคุต).

In Myanmar, Shin Upagutta is believed to reside in a floating brass palace in the southern ocean. He is invoked through Pali incantations to avert disasters, and many believe his invisible presence can prevent storms and evil spirits. He is closely associated with the nāga (mythical serpent beings) and is often portrayed seated cross-legged, holding a thabeik (alms bowl).

His veneration includes major festivals, such as one in Shwegyin near Bago during the month of Thadingyut, and another in Yangon’s Chinatown called Ye Hmyaw Pwe (ရေမျှောပွဲ), which involves processions and ceremonial offerings cast into the river.

While some traditions identify Shin Upagutta with Upagupta or even with Moggaliputta-Tissa, he is not mentioned in the Pali Canon. His story appears primarily in later texts, Burmese chronicles like the Maha Yazawin, and regional oral traditions.

== Legends ==
In the Lokapannatti, Upagupta is sent by Ashoka to tame Mara during an enshrinement festival. Afterward, he requests that Mara take the form (rupakaya) of the Buddha so that the people may see what the Buddha truly looked like.

== Cultural legacy ==
Rabindranath Tagore's poem Abhisar, from the collection Katha, retells a story of Upagupta inspired by Buddhist legends. In this poem, a courtesan named Vasavdatta encounters the monk in Mathura and invites him to her home. He declines, saying the time is not right. Months later, he finds her disfigured and cast out by society. He then cares for her, saying the time for their meeting has now come. Tagore adapted this tale from the Bodhisattvāvadānakalpalatā, a Sanskrit text by 11th-century Kashmiri poet Kshemendra.

The 1923 Malayalam poem Karuna by Kumaran Asan depicts the life of Vasavdatta and her encounters with Upagupta.

In the Japanese Zen text Transmission of Light, Upagupta is described as a great teacher. According to the account, "Whenever anyone attained realization, Upagupta would cast a talisman four fingers in breadth into a cave. The cave was eighteen cubits by twelve, and it was filled with talismans – that is how many people attained enlightenment." In the same narrative tradition, he is tempted by Mara but Upagupta is able to outwit the demon.

== See also ==
- Shin Upagutta

Buddhist titles
| Preceded by Shanavasa | Lineage of Buddhist patriarchs (According to the Zen schools of China and Japan) | Succeeded by Dhṛṭaka |
