= Dhṛṭaka =

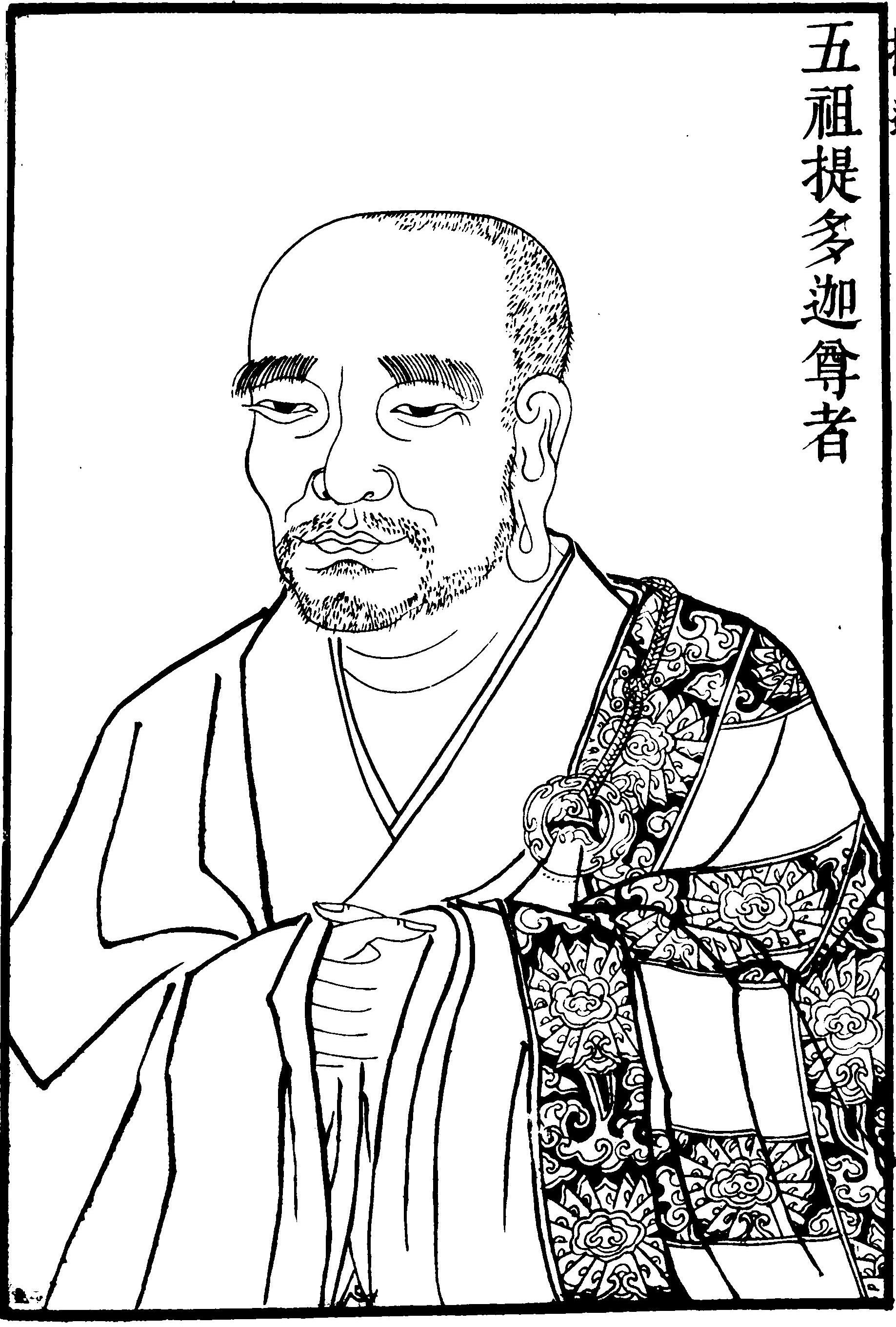

Personal life
- Born: Magadha
- Occupation: Bhikṣu

Religious life
- Religion: Buddhism
- Lineage: Chan Buddhism

Senior posting
- Teacher: Upagupta

Translations of Dhṛṭaka
- Sanskrit: Dhṛṭaka or Dhītika
- Chinese: 提多迦 (Pinyin: Tíduōjiā)
- Japanese: 提多迦(だいたか) (Rōmaji: Daitaka)
- Korean: 제다가 (RR: Jedaga)
- Tibetan: དྷི་ཏི་ཀ་ (Wylie: dhi ti ka))
- Vietnamese: Đề Đa Ca

Dhṛṭaka or Dhītika (提多迦) was a Buddhist monk from Magadha. He is recognized as the fifth Indian patriarch in Chan Buddhism as recorded in the Record of the Dharma-Jewel throughout Successive Generations (歴代法寶記). His teacher was Upagupta.

== Life ==
Dhṛṭaka was the son of a wealthy brahmin. After ordaining as a Buddhist monk, he traveled to Mathura where he trained under Upagupta. Under his teacher's guidance, Dhṛṭaka received the sevenfold instructions and achieved arhatship.

According to tradition, he traveled to Kamarupa now Modern day Assam to the east and converted a weathy sun worshiping brahmin name Siddha. Dhṛṭaka proselytized extensively, successfully introducing Buddhism to the Tokharians in central Asia. In the lineage of Chan Buddhism, he traveled to Madhyadeśa, where he converted Micchaka and his 8,000 disciples to Buddhism.

Buddhist titles
Preceded by Upagupta	Lineage of Buddhist patriarchs (According to the Zen schools of China and Japan)	Succeeded by Micchaka
