= Pink Decade =

Period of "revolutionary" poetry in Malayalam literature

The Pink Decade in Malayalam Poetry is the term used by some literary critics to describe the period in Malayalam literature (roughly the late 1940s and early 1950s) in which a brigade of young poets inspired by the ideals of scientific socialism and Marxist world view were active in creating 'revolutionary' poetry.

The term Pink Decade is to be taken as a figurative epithet rather than in its literal sense because these poets or their works cannot be confined within the span of a single decade.

Some poets belonging to this period are P. Bhaskaran, Vayalar Ramavarma. Thirunalloor Karunakaran, O N V Kurup, Punaloor Balan and Puthussery Ramachandran.

Though these writers initially shared some characteristics in common like a romantic vision of a classless society, a simple style directly addressing the masses and themes picked from the daily life of the common man, they later developed distinct poetic identities of their own.
