= Punaloor Balan =

Indian writer and poet

- Born: 3 January 1927
- Died: 19 March 1987 (aged 60)
- Occupation: Poet

Punalur Balan (3 January 1927 – 19 March 1987) was an Indian writer and a poet in Malayalam. He was born on 3 January 1927 in Punalur, Kollam district, Kerala. From his student days he was associated with the Communist movement and shot to fame during the 'Pink Decade' in Malayalam poetry.

Balan wrote lyrics and songs profusely for the cultural forums of the Communist Party and when the Kerala People's Arts Club (KPAC) staged its first play Ente Makananu Sari Balan penned the lyrics. After taking his B.A. and B.Ed. he became a school teacher. He took his M.A. in Malayalam and became a journalist. Later he joined the State Institute of Languages as a Research Officer. Kerala Sahitya Academy award was given to his collection Kottayile Pattu in 1975.

His poems are marked by a unique force which stems from the use of condensed language aimed at expressing the subtle human experiences of the modern man viewed through the Marxist angle tinged with piercing social satire.

He died on 19 March 1987.

== Selected works ==
- Thudikkunna Thaalukal
- Raaman Raaghavan
- Kottayile Paattu
- Mruthasanjeevani
- Aram
- Iruttil Pothinja Thirinaalam
