= Lineage (Buddhism) =

Lines of transmission in different schools of Buddhism

A lineage in Buddhism is a line of transmission of the Buddhist teaching that is "theoretically traced back to the Buddha himself." The acknowledgement of the transmission can be oral, or certified in documents. Several branches of Buddhism, including Chan (including Zen and Seon) and Tibetan Buddhism maintain records of their historical teachers. These records serve as validation for the living exponents of the tradition.

The historical authenticity of various Buddhist lineages has been subject to debate. Stephen Batchelor has claimed, speaking specifically about Japanese Zen lineage, "the historicity of this “lineage” simply does not withstand critical scrutiny." Erik Storlie has noted that transmission "is simply false on historical grounds." Edward Conze said "much of the traditions about the early history of Chan are the inventions of a later age."

== Vinaya ==
In the lineage of the vinaya, the requirements for ordination as a bhikkhu ("monk") or a bhikkhuni ("nun") include the presence of at least five other monks, one of whom must be a fully ordained preceptor, and another an acharya (teacher). This lineage for ordaining bhikshunis became extinct in the Theravada school and in Tibetan Buddhism. Therefore, when śrāmaṇerikās like Tenzin Palmo wanted full ordination, she had to travel to Hong Kong.

== Mahasiddha ==
Lineages in the Mahasiddha tradition do not necessarily originate from Gautama Buddha, but are ultimately grounded, like all Buddhist lineages, in the Adi-Buddha.

== Chan and Zen lineages ==
=== Construction of lineages ===
The idea of a patriarchal lineage in Chan Buddhism dates back to the epitaph for Fărú (法如 638–689), a disciple of the 5th patriarch, Hóngrĕn (弘忍 601–674). In the Long Scroll of the Treatise on the Two Entrances and Four Practices and the Continued Biographies of Eminent Monks, Daoyu and Huike are the only explicitly identified disciples of Bodhidharma. The epitaph gives a line of descent identifying Bodhidharma as the first patriarch.

In the 6th century biographies of famous monks were collected. From this genre the typical Chan-lineage was developed:

These famous biographies were non-sectarian. The Ch'an biographical works, however, aimed to establish Ch'an as a legitimate school of Buddhism traceable to its Indian origins, and at the same time championed a particular form of Ch'an. Historical accuracy was of little concern to the compilers; old legends were repeated, new stories were invented and reiterated until they too became legends.

D. T. Suzuki contends that Chan's growth in popularity during the 7th and 8th centuries attracted criticism that it had "no authorized records of its direct transmission from the founder of Buddhism" and that Chan historians made Bodhidharma the 28th patriarch of Buddhism in response to such attacks.

=== Six patriarchs ===
The earliest lineages described the lineage from Bodhidharma to Huineng. There is no generally accepted 7th Chinese Patriarch.

The principle teachers of the Chan, Zen and Seon traditions are commonly known in English translations as "Patriarchs". However, the more precise terminology would be "Ancestors" or "Founders" (Chinese: 祖; pinyin: zǔ) and "Ancestral Masters" or "Founding Masters" (Chinese: 祖師), as the commonly used Chinese terms are gender neutral. Various records of different authors are known, which give a variation of transmission lines:

	The Continued Biographies of Eminent Monks; Xù gāosēng zhuàn 續高僧傳 of Dàoxuān 道宣 (596-667)	The Record of the Transmission of the Dharma-Jewel; Chuán fǎbǎo jì 傳法寶記 of Dù Fěi 杜胐	History of Masters and Disciples of the Laṅkāvatāra-Sūtra; Léngqié shīzī jì 楞伽師資紀記 of Jìngjué 淨覺 (ca. 683 - ca. 650)	The Xiǎnzōngjì 显宗记 of Shénhuì 神会
1	Bodhidharma	Bodhidharma	Bodhidharma	Bodhidharma
2	Huìkě 慧可 (487? - 593)	Dàoyù 道育	Dàoyù 道育	Dàoyù 道育
2	Huìkě 慧可 (487? - 593)	Huìkě 慧可 (487? - 593)	Huìkě 慧可 (487? - 593)	Huìkě 慧可 (487? - 593)
3	Sēngcàn 僧璨 (d.606)	Sēngcàn 僧璨 (d.606)	Sēngcàn 僧璨 (d.606)	Sēngcàn 僧璨 (d.606)
4	Dàoxìn 道信 (580 - 651)	Dàoxìn 道信 (580 - 651)	Dàoxìn 道信 (580 - 651)	Dàoxìn 道信 (580 - 651)
5	Hóngrěn 弘忍 (601 - 674)	Hóngrěn 弘忍 (601 - 674)	Hóngrěn 弘忍 (601 - 674)	Hóngrěn 弘忍 (601 - 674)
6	-	Fǎrú 法如 (638-689)	Yuquan Shenxiu 神秀 (606? - 706)	Huìnéng 慧能 (638-713)
6	-	Yuquan Shenxiu 神秀 (606? - 706) 神秀	Xuánzé 玄賾	Huìnéng 慧能 (638-713)
7	-	-	-	Xuánjué 玄覺 (665-713)

=== Continuous lineage from Gautama Buddha ===
Eventually these descriptions of the lineage evolved into a continuous lineage from Gautama Buddha to Bodhidharma. The idea of a line of descent from Gautama is the basis for the distinctive lineage tradition of Chan.

According to the Song of Enlightenment (證道歌 Zhèngdào gē) attributed to Yǒngjiā Xuánjué (665–713), who was one of the chief disciples of Huineng, Bodhidharma was the 28th Patriarch of Buddhism in a line of descent from Gautama Buddha through his disciple Mahākāśyapa:

Mahakashyapa was the first, leading the line of transmission;

Twenty-eight Fathers followed him in the West;
The Lamp was then brought over the sea to this country;
And Bodhidharma became the First Father here
His mantle, as we all know, passed over six Fathers,

And by them many minds came to see the Light.

The Denkoroku gives 28 patriarchs in this transmission, and 53 overall:

	Sanskrit	Chinese	Vietnamese	Japanese	Korean
1	Mahākāśyapa	摩訶迦葉 / Móhējiāyè	Ma-Ha-Ca-Diếp	Makakashō	마하가섭 / Mahagasŏp
2	Ānanda	阿難陀 (阿難) / Ānántuó (Ānán)	A-Nan-Đà (A-Nan)	Ananda Buddha (Anan)	아난다 (아난) / Ananda Buddha (Anan)
3	Śānavāsa	商那和修 / Shāngnàhéxiū	Thương-Na-Hòa-Tu	Shōnawashu	상나화수 / Sangnahwasu
4	Upagupta	優婆掬多 / Yōupójúduō	Ưu-Ba-Cúc-Đa	Ubakikuta	우바국다 / Upakukta
5	Dhrtaka	提多迦 / Dīduōjiā	Đề-Đa-Ca	Daitaka	제다가 / Chedaga
6	Miccaka	彌遮迦 / Mízhējiā	Di-Dá-Ca	Mishaka	미차가 / Michaga
7	Vasumitra	婆須密 (婆須密多) / Póxūmì (Póxūmìduō)	Bà-Tu-Mật (Bà-Tu-Mật-Đa)	Bashumitsu (Bashumitta)	바수밀다 / Pasumilta
8	Buddhanandi	浮陀難提 / Fútuónándī	Phật-Đà-Nan-Đề	Buddanandai	불타난제 / Pŭltananje
9	Buddhamitra	浮陀密多 / Fútuómìduō	Phục-Đà-Mật-Đa	Buddamitta	복태밀다 / Puktaemilda
10	Pārśva	波栗濕縛 / 婆栗濕婆 (脅尊者) / Bōlìshīfú / Pólìshīpó (Xiézūnzhě)	Ba-Lật-Thấp-Phược / Bà-Lật-Thấp-Bà (Hiếp-Tôn-Giả)	Barishiba (Kyōsonja)	파률습박 (협존자) / P'ayulsŭppak (Hyŏpjonje)
11	Punyayaśas	富那夜奢 / Fùnàyèshē	Phú-Na-Dạ-Xa	Funayasha	부나야사 / Punayasa
12	Ānabodhi / Aśvaghoṣa	阿那菩提 (馬鳴) / Ānàpútí (Mǎmíng)	A-Na-Bồ-Đề (Mã-Minh)	Anabotei (Memyō)	아슈바고샤 (마명) / Asyupakosya (Mamyŏng)
13	Kapimala	迦毘摩羅 / Jiāpímóluó	Ca-Tỳ-Ma-La	Kabimora (Kabimara)	가비마라 / Kabimara
14	Nāgārjuna	那伽閼剌樹那 (龍樹) / Nàqiéèlàshùnà (Lóngshù)	Na-Già-Át-Lạt-Thụ-Na (Long-Thọ)	Nagaarajuna (Ryūju)	나가알랄수나 (용수) / Nakaallalsuna (Yongsu)
15	Āryadeva / Kānadeva	迦那提婆 / Jiānàtípó	Ca-Na-Đề-Bà	Kanadaiba	가나제바 / Kanajeba
16	Rāhulata	羅睺羅多 / Luóhóuluóduō	La-Hầu-La-Đa	Ragorata	라후라다 / Rahurada
17	Sanghānandi	僧伽難提 / Sēngqiénántí	Tăng-Già-Nan-Đề	Sōgyanandai	승가난제 / Sŭngsananje
18	Sanghayaśas	僧伽舍多 / Sēngqiéshèduō	Tăng-Già-Da-Xá	Sōgyayasha	가야사다 / Kayasada
19	Kumārata	鳩摩羅多 / Jiūmóluóduō	Cưu-Ma-La-Đa	Kumorata (Kumarata)	구마라다 / Kumarada
20	Śayata / Jayata	闍夜多 / Shéyèduō	Xà-Dạ-Đa	Shayata	사야다 / Sayada
21	Vasubandhu	婆修盤頭 (世親) / Póxiūpántóu (Shìqīn)	Bà-Tu-Bàn-Đầu (Thế-Thân)	Bashubanzu (Sejin)	바수반두 (세친) / Pasubandu (Sechin)
22	Manorhitajuna	摩拏羅 / Mónáluó	Ma-Noa-La	Manura	마나라 / Manara
23	Haklenayaśas	鶴勒那 (鶴勒那夜奢) / Hèlènà (Hèlènàyèzhě)	Hạc-Lặc-Na	Kakurokuna (Kakurokunayasha)	학륵나 / Haklŭkna
24	Simhabodhi	師子菩提 / Shīzǐpútí	Sư-Tử-Bồ-Đề / Sư-Tử-Trí	Shishibodai	사자 / Saja
25	Vasiasita	婆舍斯多 / Póshèsīduō	Bà-Xá-Tư-Đa	Bashashita	바사사다 / Pasasada
26	Punyamitra	不如密多 / Bùrúmìduō	Bất-Như-Mật-Đa	Funyomitta	불여밀다 / Punyŏmilta
27	Prajñātāra	般若多羅 / Bōrěduōluó	Bát-Nhã-Đa-La	Hannyatara	반야다라 / Panyadara
28	Dharmayana / Bodhidharma	Ta Mo / 菩提達磨	Đạt-Ma / Bồ-Đề-Đạt-Ma	Daruma / Bodaidaruma	Tal Ma /보리달마 / Poridalma]

=== Transmission to Japan ===
Twenty-four different Zen lineages are recorded to be transmitted to Japan. Only three survived until today. Sōtō was transmitted to Japan by Dōgen, who travelled to China for Chan training in the 13th century. After receiving Dharma transmission in the Caodong school, he returned to Japan and established the lineage there, where it is called the Sōtō.

The Linji school was also transmitted to Japan several times, where it is the Rinzai school.

== Pure Land Buddhism ==
Unlike the other Buddhist lineages, Pure Land Buddhism does not maintain a strict linear line of succession based on direct master-disciple relationship. Instead, various Pure Land Buddhist authors have developed lists of important Pure Land masters who have been acknowledged throughout history as having furthered the Pure Land tradition either through new insights, or by spreading of the teachings. Such teachers rarely lived at the same time as other "patriarchs" in the list. Nevertheless, their writings and contributions are considered to form a single continuum of Pure Land teaching and practice.

=== Chinese ===
Chinese Buddhism commonly relies on the following list of Pure Land patriarchs:

1. Lushan Huiyuan (334-416)
2. Shandao (613-681)
3. Chengyuan (承遠, 712-802)
4. Fazhao (法照, dates unknown)
5. Shaokang (少康, d. 805)
6. Yongming Yanshou (永明延壽, 904-975)
7. Shengchang (省常, 959–1020)
8. Yunqi Zhuhong (雲棲袾宏1535-1615)
9. Ouyi Zhixu (蕅益智旭1599–1655)
10. Xingce (行策, 1628–1682)
11. Shixian (實賢, 1686–1734)
12. Jixing Chewu (際醒徹悟, 1741–1810)
13. Shi Yinguang (釋印光, c. 1861–1940)

=== Japanese ===
In Jōdo Shinshū and Jōdo Shū Buddhist traditions, "Patriarch" refers to seven Indian, Chinese and Japanese masters leading up to the founder of their respective schools. Both traditions agree with the list of patriarchs up to Genshin.

The Japanese patriarchal listing is as follows:

Name	Dates	Japanese name	Country of origin	Contribution
Nagarjuna	150–250	Ryūju (龍樹)	India	First one to advocate the Pure Land as a valid Buddhist path.
Vasubandhu	ca. 4th century	Tenjin (天親) or Seshin (世親)	India	Expanded on Nagarjuna's Pure Land teachings, commentaries on Pure Land sutras.
Tan-luan	476–542(?)	Donran (曇鸞)	China	Developed the six-syllable nembutsu chant commonly recited, emphasized the role of Amitabha Buddha's vow to rescue all beings.
Daochuo	562–645	Dōshaku (道綽)	China	Promoted the concept of "easy path" of the Pure Land in comparison to the tradition "path of the sages". Taught the efficacy of the Pure Land path in the latter age of the Dharma.
Shandao	613–681	Zendō (善導)	China	Stressed the importance of verbal recitation of Amitabha Buddha's name.
Genshin	942–1017	Genshin (源信)	Japan	Popularized Pure Land practices for the common people, with emphasis on salvation.
Hōnen	1133–1212	Hōnen (法然)	Japan	Developed a specific school of Buddhism devoted solely to rebirth in the Pure Land, further popularized recitation of name of Amitabha Buddha in order to attain rebirth in the Pure Land. A patriarch in the Jōdo Shinshū tradition only.

== Tibetan Buddhism ==
The 14th Dalai Lama, in the foreword to Karmapa: The Sacred Prophecy states:

Within the context of Tibetan Buddhism, the importance of lineage extends far beyond the ordinary sense of a particular line of inheritance or descent. Lineage is a sacred trust through which the integrity of Buddha's teachings is preserved intact as it is transmitted from one generation to the next. The vital link through which the spiritual tradition is nourished and maintained is the profound connection between an enlightened master and perfectly devoted disciple. The master-disciple relationship is considered extremely sacred by all the major schools of Tibetan Buddhism.

=== Karma Kagyu ===
==== Possession of lineage ====
Wallace renders into English a citation of Karma Chagme (Wylie: karma chags med, fl. 17th century) that contains an embedded quotation attributed to Nāropā (956–1041 CE):

The crucial, primary qualification of a spiritual mentor is stated by Naropa, "The qualification of a spiritual mentor is that he possesses the lineage."
The Single Meaning of the Vajra Speech [Wylie: rDo rje'i gsungs dgongs pa gcig pa] states, "There is great profundity in the connection within the lineage of the holy Dharma." The real lineage of the realization of this Dharma, which transfer blessings, (Note: "In the Buddhist context, the term blessing should not be understood in terms of grace as in the case of theistic religions. Rather, it relates to the sense of inspiration received...which transforms or awakens the potentials inherent within an individual's mental continuum. Thus, the Tibetan word byin-rlabs is interpreted to mean: 'to be transformed through inspiring magnificence'.") is the unbroken rosary of Buddhas...".

==== Preservation of lineages ====
Gyatrul (b. 1924), in a purport to Karma Chagme, conveys Dilgo Khyentse's 'samaya', diligence and humility in receiving Vajrayana empowerment, lineal Dharma transmission and rlung, as rendered into English by Wallace (Chagmé et al., 1998: p. 21):

With respect to oral transmission, even if the lineage is impure, it is not a problem. Dilgo Khyentse Rinpoche often sought out and received any oral transmission he thought was on the verge of disappearing. It made no difference who was giving it. He would receive it and, in turn, pass it on to make sure that the lineage remained unbroken.

=== Chöd ===
Chöd is an advanced spiritual practice known as "Cutting Through the Ego." This practice, based on the Prajnaparamita sutra, uses specific meditations and tantric ritual.

There are several hagiographic accounts of how chöd came to Tibet. One namtar (hagiography) asserts that shortly after Kamalaśīla won his famous debate with Moheyan as to whether Tibet should adopt the "sudden" route to enlightenment or his own "gradual" route, Kamalaśīla enacted phowa, transferring his mindstream to animate a corpse polluted with contagion in order to safely move the hazard it presented. As the mindstream of Kamalaśīla was otherwise engaged, a mahasiddha named Dampa Sangye came across the vacant kuten or "physical basis" of Kamalaśīla. Dampa Sangye was not karmically blessed with an aesthetic corporeal form, and upon finding the very handsome and healthy empty body of Kamalaśīla, which he assumed to be a newly dead fresh corpse, used phowa to transfer his own mindstream into Kamalaśīla's body. Dampa Sangye's mindstream in Kamalaśīla's body continued the ascent to the Himalaya and thereby transmitted the Pacification of Suffering teachings and the Indian form of Chöd which contributed to the Mahamudra Chöd of Machig Labdrön. The mindstream of Kamalaśīla was unable to return to his own kuten and so was forced to enter the vacant body of Dampa Sangye.

== See also ==
- Apostolic succession, a similar practice in Christian tradition
- Dharma transmission
- Gotra
- Religious order
- Sangharaja
- Zen lineage charts

== Sources ==
- Chang, Chung-Yuan (1967), "Ch'an Buddhism: Logical and Illogical", Philosophy East and West, 17 (1/4), Philosophy East and West, Vol. 17, No. 1/4: 37–49, doi:10.2307/1397043, JSTOR 1397043, archived from the original on 2011-05-24
- Cole, Alan (2009), Fathering Your Father: The Zen of Fabrication in Tang Buddhism, Berkeley, Los Angeles, London: University of California Press, ISBN 978-0-520-25485-5
- Cook, Francis Dojun (2003), Transmitting the Light: Zen Master's Keizan's Denkoroku, Boston: Wisdom Publications
- Diener, Michael S. (1991), The Shambhala Dictionary of Buddhism and Zen, and friends, Boston: Shambhala
- Dumoulin, Heinrich (1993), "Early Chinese Zen Reexamined: A Supplement to Zen Buddhism: A History", Japanese Journal of Religious Studies, 20 (1): 31–53, doi:10.18874/jjrs.20.1.1993.31-53, ISSN 0304-1042
- Haskel, Peter (2001). Letting Go: The Story of Zen Master Tōsui. University of Hawaii Press. ISBN 0-8248-2440-7.
- Suzuki, D.T. (1948), Manual of Zen Buddhism (PDF), archived from the original (PDF) on 2011-07-21
- Suzuki, D.T. (1949), Essays in Zen Buddhism, New York: Grove Press, ISBN 0-8021-5118-3
- Yampolski, Philip (2003), Chan. A Historical Sketch. In: Buddhist Spirituality. Later China, Korea, Japan and the Modern World; edited by Takeuchi Yoshinori, Delhi: Motilal Banarsidass
