= Changampuzha Krishna Pillai =

Indian poet

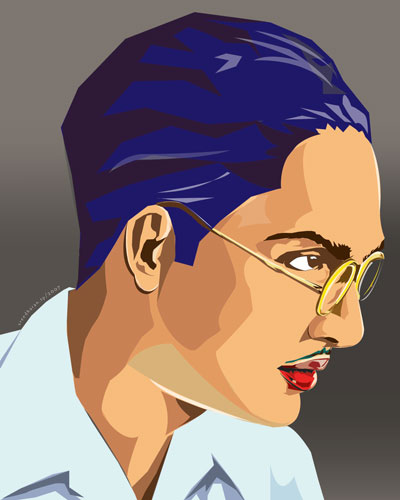
- Born: Changampuzha Krishna Pillai; 10 October 1911; Edappally, Ernakulam
- Died: 17 June 1948 (aged 36); Trichur, Kingdom of Cochin
- Resting place: Edappally, Kochi
- Education: Maharaja's College, Ernakulam
- Occupations: Poet, writer
- Spouse: Sreedevi Amma
- Children: Sreekumar, Ajitha, Jayadev and Lalitha
- Writing career
- Language: Malayalam
- Period: 1931–1948
- Genre: Romance
- Notable work: Ramanan

Changampuzha Krishna Pillai (10 October 1911 – 17 June 1948) was a celebrated Malayalam poet from Kerala, India, known for his elegy Ramanan which was written in 1936 and sold over 100,000 copies. It is a long pastoral elegy, a play written in the form of verse, allegedly based on the life of Changampuzha's friend Edappally Raghavan Pillai. It was adapted into a movie in 1967. He is credited with bringing poetry to the masses with his simple romantic style. He died of tuberculosis aged 36. His style influenced the next few generations of Malayalam poetry, notable among them was Vayalar Ramavarma, famous Malayalam lyricist.

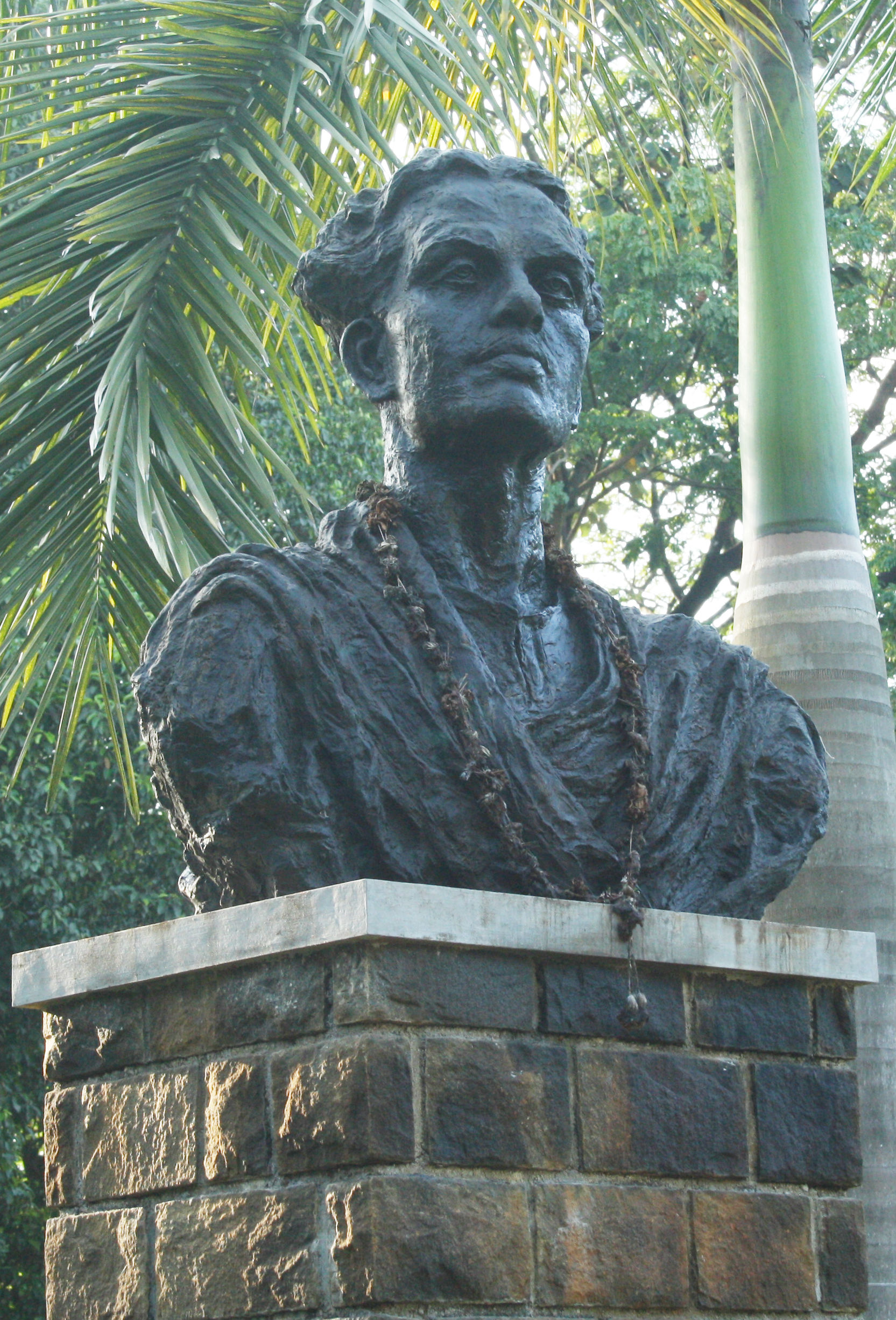
Statue of Changampuzha at Changampuzha Park, Kochi

== Life ==
Born on 10 October 1911 in Edappally, presently part of Kochi city, to a Malayali Nair family, Changampuzha Krishna Pillai had his elementary education there itself. He completed his school education at Aluva and Ernakulam. College education was from Maharaja's College, Ernakulam and Thiruvananthapuram. Later, after working as a clerk in Military Accountant's Office at Pune and at Kochi, he went to Chennai for studying law, which he could not complete due to financial problems. He later worked in a press at Thrissur. It was during this time he wrote many of his works, though he had started writing even when he was a student. He had to study his own poem for his B.A. Honours class.

Even though he had only about 25 years of creative period in his life, he became an epic poet, without writing any epic poem following the conventional norms. His legendary pastoral elegy, Ramanan was sold more than 100,000 copies, a record that still stands firm in Malayalam. Famous Malayalam critique Joseph Mundassery who was the first Education Minister of Kerala State and also the first Vice-Chancellor of Cochin University, was highly impressed reading 'Ramanan', and wrote his own introductory remarks for its 15th reprint praising the elegy.

Changampuzha's other famous works include Vazhakkula, Divyageetham, Yavanika, Bashpanjali, Manaswini, Sankalpakanthi, Devageetha, Spandikkunna Asthimatam, Udyana lakshmi, Patunna Pisachu, novel Kalithozhi and others. He was a close friend of Edappally Raghavan Pillai, another great poet of his time. 'Samastha Kerala Sahitya Parishath', an organisation of Malayalam literary workers had its first convention at Edappally. Changampuzha worked hard for its success.

Changampuzha started a career as a clerk in Port trust. He could not continue there due to health and personal reasons. He took up another assignment at a Printing Press (Mangalodayam) at Thrissur. He got married and became a father of four children, among which his younger son died before he turned one. Later, he started suffering from tuberculosis and became bed ridden. Finally in 1948, on the rainy day of 17 June at half past 3 pm, he died at the age of thirty-six and nine months. His body was cremated in the compound of his house at Edappally. An appropriate monument has been erected there, which is visited by the lovers of Malayalam language. He is now survived by his younger daughter Lalitha. His wife outlived him for 54 years, finally dying in 2002. His elder son Sreekumar died in a road accident in 2004. His elder daughter Ajitha committed suicide in the late 1980s with her whole family.

== Published works ==
=== Poetry ===
- 'Ramanan(രമണന്‍, 1936).
- Vaazhakkula (വാഴക്കുല, 1937).
- Divyageetham (ദിവ്യഗീതം, 1945).
- Devageetha (ദേവഗീത, 1945).
- Bashpaanjali (ബാഷ്പാഞ്ജലി).
- Spandikkunna Asthimaadam (സ്പന്ദിക്കുന്ന അസ്ഥിമാടം).
- Rekthapushpangal (രക്‌തപുഷ്പങ്ങള്‍).
- Madirolsavam (മദിരോത്സവം).
- Padunna Pisachu (പാടുന്ന പിശാച്‌).
- Neerunna Theechoola (നീറുന്ന തീച്ചൂള).

=== Prose ===
- Kalithozhi (കളിത്തോഴി).
- Katharathnamalika (കഥാരത്നമാലിക).

Changampuzha's biography named Changampuzha Krishnapilla: Nakshatrangalude Snehabhajanam was released by M. K. Sanu in 1988.

== Tomb ==
The poet's 'tomb' is also in the neighbourhood, presently maintained by the Cochin Corporation and Greater Cochin Development Authority. Originally, the area wherein the tomb is located was belonging to his maternal family property. On the tomb, a few lines from the poet's famous poem "Spandikkunna Asthimadom" have been carved.

താരകകളെ കാണ്മിതോ നിങ്ങൾ
താഴെയുള്ളൊരീ പ്രേതകുടീരം
ഹന്ത! യിന്നതിൻ ചിത്ത രഹസ്യം
എന്തറിഞ്ഞൂ ഹാ! ദൂരസ്ഥർ നിങ്ങൾ
പാല പൂത്തു പരിമളമെത്തി
പാതിരയെ പുണർന്നൊഴുകുമ്പോൾ
മഞ്ഞണിഞ്ഞൂ മദാലസയായി
മഞ്ജുചന്ദ്രിക നൃത്തമാടുമ്പോൾ
മന്ദമന്ദം പൊടിപ്പതായ് കേൾക്കാം
സ്പന്ദനങ്ങളീ കല്ലറയ്കുള്ളിൽ

== Quotes ==
Come what may, I want to savour,
this life like wine

(എന്തു വന്നാലുമെനിക്കാസ്വദിക്കണം മുന്തിരിച്ചാറു പോലുള്ളൊരീ ജീവിതം)

Having a sincere heart

in this world of hypocrisy

is my failure

(കപട ലോകത്തിലാത്മാർത്ഥമായൊരു ഹൃദയമുണ്ടായതാണെൻ പരാജയം)

Last night, I slept
on the smile of a flower bud

(ഇന്നലെ രാത്രിയിൽ ഞാനൊരു പൂമൊട്ടിൻ മന്ദസ്മിതത്തിൽ കിടന്നുറങ്ങി)

== Cultural influences ==
Changampuzha's most famous work Ramanan has been converted into a movie going by the same name in 1967. It was directed by D M Pottekattu and had Prem Nazir and Sheela in the lead roles. The movie also features the popular poem Malaranikkadukal from Ramanan as the title score.

A movie called Arikilundayirunnenkil, based on the life of Changampuzha is in the planning stage. The movie will be directed by the National Award winning director Priyanandanan. It was announced that Fahad Fazil will play the role of Changampuzha in the movie. It is based on his biography Nakshathrangalude Snehabhajanam written by M. K. Sanu. Noted children's writer, P. I. Sankaranarayanan, has also written a biography of the writer, titled Spandikkunna Changampuzha.

== Memorials ==
"Changampuzha Smaraka Grandhasala" (meaning Changampuzha Memorial Library) and the Changampuzha Park, are two institutions established as memorial for the great poet at his birthplace Edappally.

== Gallery ==
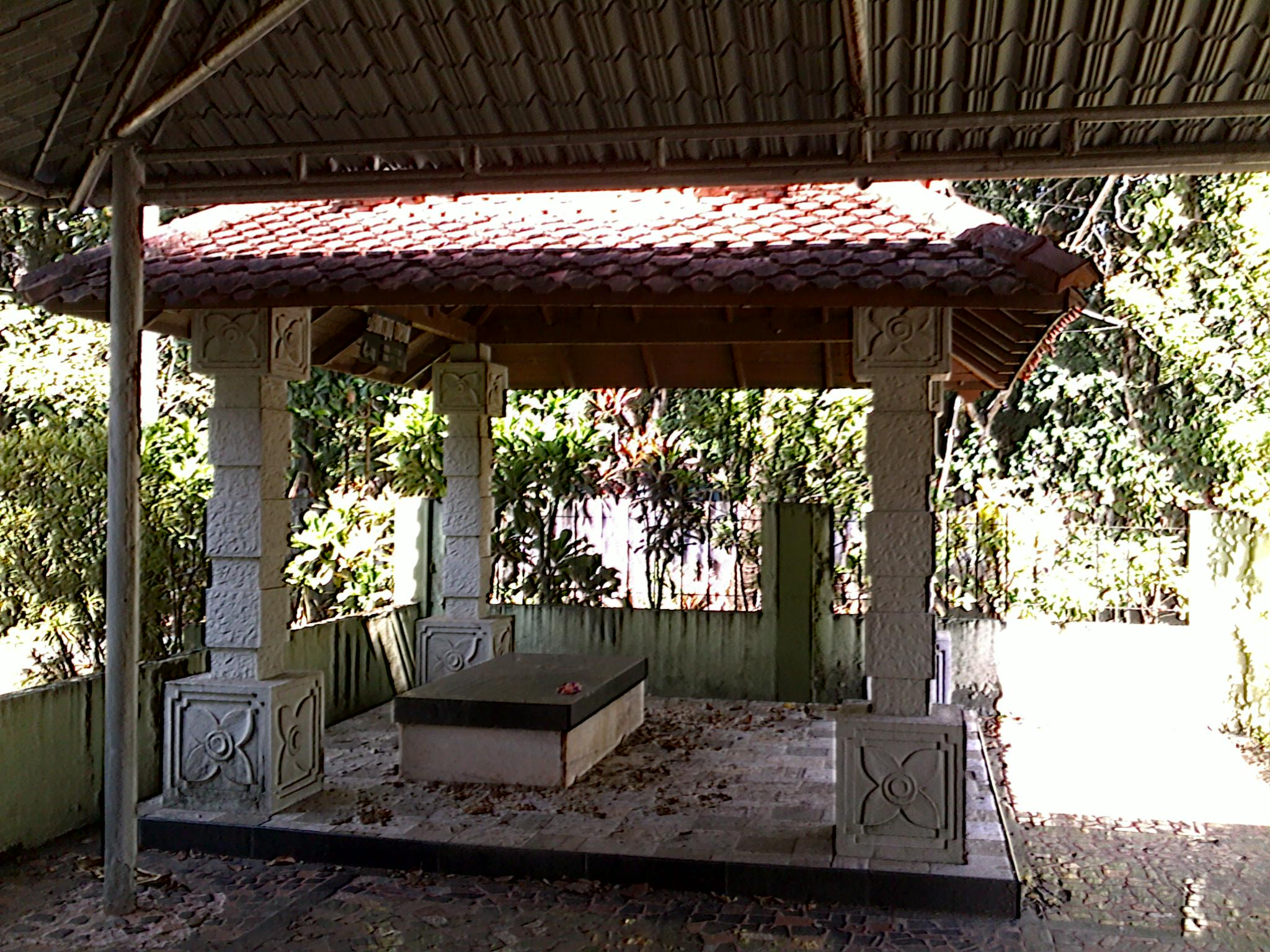
Changampuzha Samadhi Mandiram

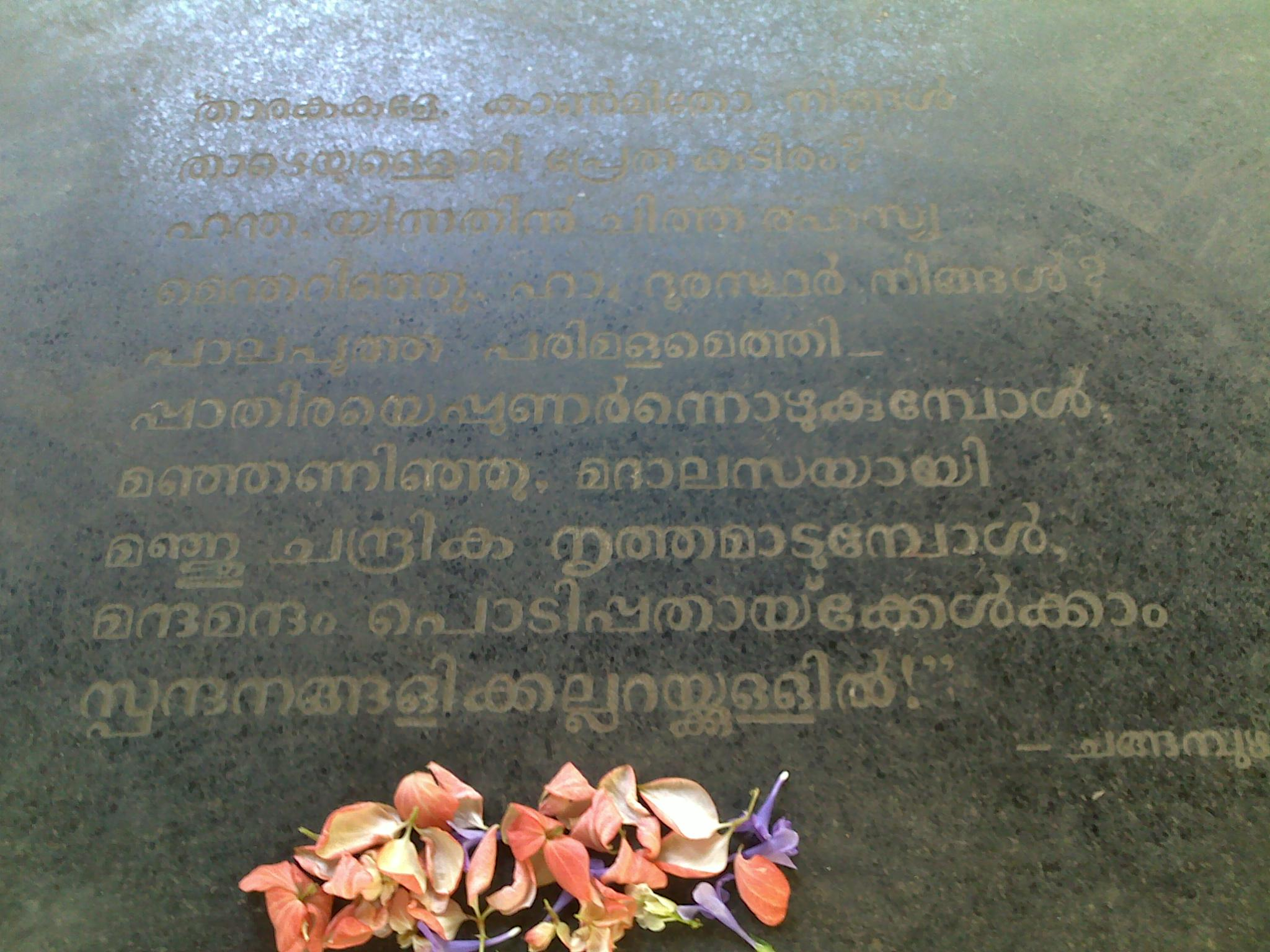
Lines from "Spandikkunna Asthimadam" inscribed at Changampuzha Samadhi
