= Thirunalloor Kavyolsavam =

Cultural festival

Thirunalloor Kavyolsavam-is an annual cultural festival held in Quilon district in Kerala, India to commemorate poet Thirunalloor Karunakaran(1924-2006).

It is organized from May 1 to 3 every year by Thirunalloor Smrithikendram, a memorial trust. According to the organisers, May 1, International Workers' Day is selected for commencing the festival considering the close link Thirunalloor 's poetry had with working class political movement and its philosophy.

The three-day-long festival is a composite cultural event of various programmes like poetry recitals, debates, painting and photo exhibitions, light and sound shows, book fairs, film shows etc. and is meant as a converging forum for all forms of creative expressions with an underlying theme of progressive social change. It is conducted in an unconventional way avoiding a formal inauguration or valediction ceremony, and every year the festival begins with the choral recital of Thirunalloor 's famous song "May diname…"(Salute to thee May Day..) hailing the May Day.

Some of its regular features include 'Samghageethikal'(Group songs), choral recitation of Thirunalloor 's revolutionary songs; 'Anthi Mayangumbol'(When the dusk falls) –the title taken from a famous song of Thirunalloor - where poets and musicians recite his poems; 'Janavedi'(People's Forum) where various sociopolitical and cultural topics are debated with audience participation; 'Kalippanthal'(Play shed ) a forum for children; etc.
