= Śāṇavāsa =

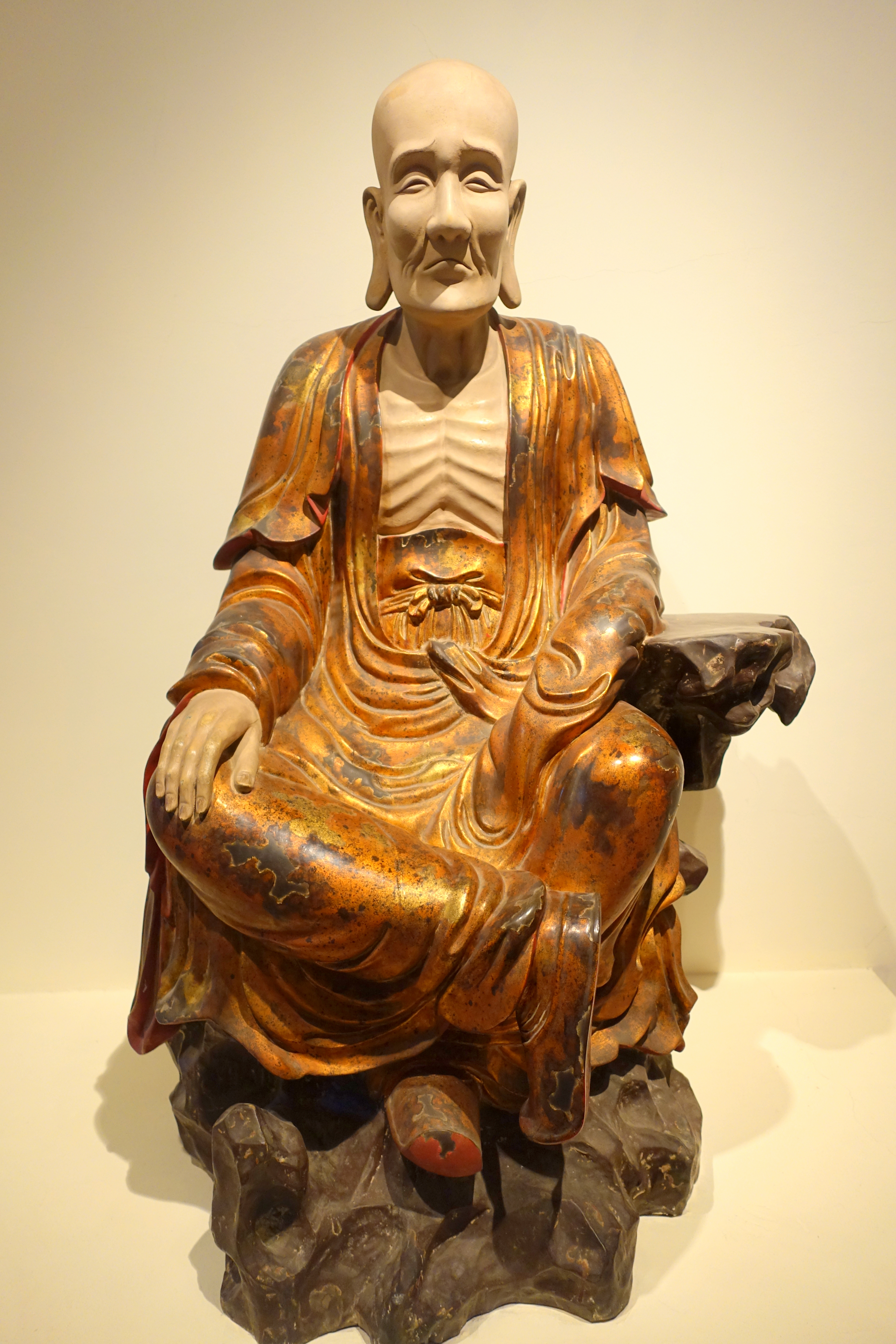
Śāṇavāsa statue, Tây Phương Temple, Vietnam, 1794 AD

Śāṇavāsa (Śānakavāsin, Sambhūta Śāṇavāsi or Sanakavasa) was a disciple of Ananda, and is considered the fourth Indian Patriarch in Chan/Zen Buddhism after Shakyamuni, Mahakashyapa and Ananda.

Buddhist titles
Preceded by Ananda	Lineage of Buddhist patriarchs (According to the Zen schools of China and Japan)	Succeeded by Upagupta
