= V. Sambasivan =

Indian Kadhaprasangam artist (1929–1997)

Velayudhan Sambasivan (4 July 1929 – 23 April 1996) was a famous "Kadhaprasangam" artist of Kerala, India. He was born on 4 July 1929 in Chavara Thekkumbhagom in Kollam district, as the eldest son of Meloottu Velayudhan and Sarada. He had seven siblings. After schooling in his native village he joined Sree Narayana College, Kollam for higher studies where he was associated with the Communist Party of India and its student wing AISF. His gift for singing and acting earned him the name of an artist very early in his life. He started his career as a teacher but quit the job to become a full-time artiste. With his inimitable style in story-telling, he soon became one of the most popular artists of Kerala with immense mass appeal. He presented more than 50 stories on stage including Shakespeare's Othello and Dostoyevsky's The Brothers Karamazov. Being a member of the Communist Party of India he was arrested and imprisoned in 1975, during the Indian Emergency declared by the then regime headed by Indira Gandhi. He died of lung cancer on 23 April 1996, aged 67.

V. Sambasivan received the Kerala Sangeetha Nataka Akademi Fellowship in 1980. He has acted in a feature film 'Pallamkuzhi' and in a documentary on poet Kumaran Asan.

V. Sambasivan was married to Subhadra. His eldest son Vasantakumar Sambashivan, a Professor of Chemistry at Sree Narayana College, Kollam follows his father's way. Other than Vasanthakumar, he has three more sons named Prasanth, Jinaraj and Jesus, and a daughter named Aishwarya. Mrs. Subhadra Sambasivan died on 20 February 2021 aged 80. His house still contains valuable memories and his works. Also, his office is still maintained in the same style.

Discography

1. Devatha (1949)
2. Kochuseetha (1949)
3. Magdalanamariyam (1950)
4. Vazhakkula (1951)
5. Vathsala (1951)
6. Bharathastreekalthan Bhavashudhi (1952)
7. Aayisha (1953)
8. Tharavadinte Manam (1953)
9. Puthankalavum Arivalum (1954)
10. Rani (1955)
11. Pattunoolum Vazhanarum (1956)
12. Kudiozhikkal (1957)
13. Premashilpi (1958)
14. Thara (1959)
15. Pareekshanam (1960)
16. Pulliman (1961)
17. Chandanakattil (1962)
18. Aneesya (1963)
19. Othello (1964)
20. Antigone (1965)
21. Kakkathampurati (1966)
22. Melangi (1967)
23. Annakarenina (1968)
24. Romeo & Juliet (1969)
25. Uyirthezhunelppu (1970)
26. Don shanthamayi ozhukunnu (1971)
27. Hena (1972)
28. Kumaranasan (1973)
29. Vilakk Vangam (1974)
30. Nellinte Geetham (1975)
31. Irupatham Noottandu(1976)
32. Sree Narayana Gurudevan (1976)
33. Nallabhoomi (1977)
34. Rainbow (1978)
35. Samkranthi (1979)
36. Ghost (1980)
37. Yanthram (1981)
38. Cleopatra (1982)
39. Karamazov Sahodaranamar (1983)
40. Devalokam (1984)
41. Prathi (1985)
42. Divyatheertham (1986)
43. Sanatta (1986)
44. Deshasnehi (1987)
45. Artham (1988)# Vyasanum Marxum (1989)
46. Labham Labham (1990)
47. 1857 (1990)
48. Z (1991)
49. Jalasechanam (1991)
50. Kuttavum Shikshayum (1992)
51. Siddhartha (1993)
52. Pathivrethayude Kamukan (1994)
53. Ezhu Nimishangal (1995)

Sambasivan's last stage performance was on 7 March 1996, Pankulam Madan Nada temple, Attingal where he performed "Ezhu Nimishangal".

== Troup ==
Sambashivan's "Kadhaprasangam" troup consisted of six members including him. Kochi Rajappan (thabalist), Kadavoor Madhu and Venmony Vijayakumar (harmonist), Changanassery Rajan, Babu, Yousef and more. He and his troup travelled across various countries and covered more than thousand stages.
