= K. V. Anoop =

Indian writer (1972–2014)

K V Anoop
- Born: 1972
- Died: 15 September 2014 (aged 41); Kozhikode, India
- Occupation: Sub-editor

K. V. Anoop (1972–2014) was a chief sub-editor of 'Star & Style' in the Malayalam newspaper Mathrubhumi and a well-known short story writer in Malayalam. He joined Mathrubhumi in 1997 as sub-editor.

== Works ==
Anoop's literary works include:

- Anandapathuvinte Prasangangal
- Kazhchakkulla Vibhavangal (collection of short stories)*
- Ammadeivangalude Bhoomi (novel)
- Maradona: Deivam, Chekuthan
- Rakthasakshi (a biography)
- Lionel Messi: Tharodayathinte Kadha

== Awards ==
Anoop's novel Ammadeivangalude Bhoomi won the Uroob award in 1992. He received the Muttathu Varkey Foundation award in 1994, the Ankanam-E P Sushama Memorial Endowment in 2006, and the Mundoor Krishnankutty award in 2011.
