= P. I. Sankaranarayanan =

Indian writer (1945–2026)

- Born: August 4, 1945; Pallikkunnu, Kannur district, Kerala, India
- Died: 25 March 2026 (aged 80)
- Occupations: Writer, Poet, Children's writer, Radio personality
- Writing career
- Pen name: Sankaranara
- Genre: Children's literature
- Notable works: Easoupu Kathakal; Thaalappattukal; Chandanakattile Adbhutham
- Notable awards: Kerala State Institute of Children's Literature Award; Thonnakkal Kumaran Asan Memorial Poetry Award; Kunjunni Puraskkaram; Consumer Awareness Award; Bhilai Malayalam Library Golden Jubilee Award; Kavisamajam Puraskaram

P. I. Sankaranarayanan (1945–2026), known by his pen name Sankaranara, was an Indian writer, Children's writer, poet and radio personality who wrote in Malayalam language. He wrote 91 books, covering children's literature, mythological stories, and poems. He was a recipient of several awards including Kerala State Institute of Children's Literature Award, Thonnakkal Kumaran Asan Memorial Poetry Award, Kunjunni Puraskkaram, Consumer Awareness Award, Bhilai Malayalam Library Golden Jubilee Award and Kavisamajam Puraskaram. He died on March 25, 2026, at the age of 80.

== Biography ==
Sankaranarayanan, born on August 4, 1945, in Pallikkunnu, in Kannur, in the south Indian state of Kerala, completed his college education in Ernakulam and Kozhikode, before starting his career as a journalist. Later he joined the Spices Board of India and served as the editor of Spices Board publications such as Spice India and Elam. It was during his tenure there, he coined the famous tag line, Make cardomom a habit, for the Board. He n a publishing company by name Navamana Publications and served as a committee member of Samastha Kerala Sahitya Parishath (Pan-Kerala Literary Academy), a literary academy which dates back to 1926.

Sankaranarayanan published 91 books covering the stories, children's literature and poetry. He also did radio programs in Kochi FM Radio under the names, Subhashithangal, Madhuramee Malayalam and Paryayamanjari. He received a number of awards which included Kerala State Institute of Children's Literature Award, Thonnakkal Kumaran Asan Memorial Poetry Award, Kunjunni Puraskkaram, Consumer Awareness Award, Bhilai Malayalam Library Golden Jubilee Award and Kavisamajam Puraskaram.

Sankaranarayanan was married to Nalini. He was under treatment during his last days and died at a private hospital in Kochi on March 25, 2026, at the age of 80.

== Selected bibliography ==
| Title | Year | Publisher |
|---|---|---|
| Urangunna Thalamura | 1980 | Sahitya Pravarthaka Sahakarana Sangam |
| Thalappattukal | 1985 | Sahitya Pravarthaka Sahakarana Sangam |
| Utharamenth | 1994 | Current Books |
| Kadamkatha Padaprasnam | 2010 | Nirmala Books |
| Aravindaghosh | 2012 | Kerala Bhasha Institute |
| Devathayude swapnam | 2014 | Kairali Books |
| Spandikkunna Changambuzha | 2014 | Green Books |
| Easoupu Kathakal | 2014 | DC Books |
| Syamanthakarahasyam | 2022 | Poorna Publications |

== See also ==
- Ramesan Mullassery
- Malayath Appunni
