= Veena Poovu (poem) =

1907 Malayalam poem by Kumaran Asan

Veena Poovu (English: Fallen Flower) is a 1907 Malayalam poem written by Kumaran Asan. The poem is considered the beginning of a new era in Malayalam literature, and is one of Asan's most significant works. Legends are that the poet saw a fallen flower on his way while walking and wrote this philosophical poem. Various translations and other artistic representations of the poem have been produced, and its centennial was celebrated in Kerala. Composed of forty-one stanzas, the poem is a philosophical treatment of death by looking at the life cycle of a flower.
