= Karuna (poem) =

Karuna (കരുണ; transl. Compassion) is a Malayalam poem by Kumaran Asan about a courtesan named Vasavadatta and the famous Buddhist monk Upagupta, first published in 1923. The story primarily follows the life of Vasavadatta, including her youth, misfortunes, and encounters with Upagupta.

Asan derived the story from the 1894 book The Gospel of Buddha (which Asan also adapted into its own Malayalam epic), and, according to a review by N. N. Pillai, Asana wrote Karuna in imitation of Ramapurathu Warrier's 18th century Vanchippattu poem Kuchelavritham Vanchippattu. One of the few works by Asan which presents a heroine in terms of sensory attraction, the story ultimately messages how the body and carnal consummation are not enough. It is also the third story by Asan to feature a redeemed prostitute, the others being Mariam and Pingala.

== Quotes ==
അഹഹ! സങ്കടമോർത്താൽ മനുഷ്യജീവിതത്തേക്കാൾ
മഹിയിൽ ദയനീയമായ് മറ്റെന്തോന്നുള്ളു?
Alas alas! It is sad to reflect, is there something
In the world more pitiable than the life of man?

ഖിന്നമുഖിയാമവൾതൻ കെടുന്ന സംജ്ഞ വിരലാ-
ലുന്നയിച്ച ദീപം പോലൊന്നുജ്വലിക്കുന്നു.
The dying awareness of the sad faced woman
Brightens like an oil lamp when its wick is lengthened.

== See also ==
- Upagupta
- Jataka tales
