= Ramanan (film) =

- Theatrical release poster
- Directed by: D. M. Pottekkat
- Screenplay by: D. M. Pottekkat
- Based on: Ramanan by Changampuzha Krishna Pillai
- Produced by: D. M. Pottekkat
- Starring: Prem Nazir; Sheela; Madhu
- Cinematography: U. Rajagopal
- Edited by: K. Narayanan
- Music by: K. Raghavan
- Production companies: Vijaya Studios, Madras; Vauhini Studios, Madras; Shyamala Studios, Madras
- Release date: 1967
- Country: India
- Language: Malayalam

Ramanan is a 1967 Indian Malayalam-language romantic musical film written, directed and produced by D. M. Pottekkat. It is an adaptation of Ramanan (1936), a poem by Changampuzha Krishna Pillai. The film stars Prem Nazir and Sheela. Madhu, Kottayam Chellappan, Kamaladevi, Meenakumari, Ramu Kariat, Adoor Bhasi, Usha Kumari and Manavalan Joseph play other important roles. The film was noted for its technical merit and for being the adaptation of an enduring poetical work, but it was a box-office flop.

== Cast ==
- Prem Nazir as Ramanan
- Sheela as Chandrika
- Madhu as Madhanan
- Kottayam Chellappan as Advocate Peshkar
- Meena (Malayalam actress) as Madhavi Amma
- Ramu Kariat as Rajan
- Sankaradi as Krishnan Nair
- Kottayam Chellappan
- Nellikkode Bhaskaran as Ramu
- Chithralekha
- Kamaladevi as Bhanumati
- Usha Kumari/Vennira Aadai Nirmala as Karthi
- Adoor Bhasi as the temple priest
- Manavalan Joseph as Vallon, Karthi's father

== Soundtrack ==
The music was composed by K. Raghavan and the lyrics were written by Changampuzha. Background Music was composed by M. B. Sreenivasan

No.	Song	Singers	Lyrics	Length (m:ss)
1	"Aa Manimedayil"	Karimpuzha Radha	Changampuzha	
2	"Angottu Nokkiyaal"	Karimpuzha Radha, K. P. Udayabhanu	Changampuzha	
3	"Ariyoo" (Bit)	Madhu	Changampuzha	
4	"Azhakalakal"	Karimpuzha Radha, K. P. Udayabhanu	Changampuzha	
5	"Chapalavyaamohangal"	K. P. Udayabhanu	Changampuzha	
6	"Ekaantha Kaamuka"	Shantha P. Nair	Changampuzha	
7	"Jeevitham Jeevitham" (Bit)	Karimpuzha Radha	Changampuzha	
8	"Kaananachaaya"	P. Leela, K. P. Udayabhanu	Changampuzha	
9	"Maanasam Kallukondu" (Bit)	P. B. Sreenivas	Changampuzha	
10	"Malaranikkaadukal"	Karimpuzha Radha, Kottayam Santha	Changampuzha	
11	"Manimuzhakkam"	K. P. Udayabhanu	Changampuzha	
12	"Naakathil Aadithya" (Bit)	Karimpuzha Radha	Changampuzha	
13	"Neelakkuyile"	Karimpuzha Radha	Changampuzha	
14	"Ninnaathma Naayakan"	Karimpuzha Radha	Changampuzha	
15	"Pennennoru" (Bit)	Manavalan Joseph	Changampuzha	
16	"Pottukillini"	P. Leela	Changampuzha	
17	"Praananaayaka"	P. Leela	Changampuzha	
18	"Ramananeeyennil" (Bit)	Madhu	Changampuzha	
19	"Sahakarikkatte Sahaja" (Bit)	Madhu	Changampuzha	
20	"Sampoothamee"	P. Leela	Changampuzha	
21	"Velli Nakshathrame"	K. P. Udayabhanu	Changampuzha	
