= Ramanan (play in verse) =

Indian-Malayalam language play in verse

Ramanan (Malayalam: രമണന്‍) is the most celebrated work of Malayalam poet Changampuzha Krishna Pillai. It is a play written in the form of verse. It is a pastoral elegy written after the death of his friend, Edappally Raghavan Pillai. Written in 1936, it is the bestseller of Malayalam literature.

Changampuzha's Ramanan became so successful that the Kerala University prescribed it as a textbook in Malayalam literature class. Changampuzha himself was a literature student at Kerala University at that time.

== Adaptations ==
- Renowned Katha Prasangam artist Kedamangalam Sadanandan has performed this poem in many stages when Changampuzha was alive.
- In 1967, its film adaptation, Ramanan was released. It was written and directed by D. M. Pottekkat, and starred Prem Nazir, Sheela, Madhu, Kottayam Chellappan, Kamaladevi, Meena, Ramu Kariat, Adoor Bhasi, Usha Kumari and Manavalan Joseph. It was a box office flop.
