= List of Malayalam-language authors by category =

The field of Malayalam writers include the following people, from various disciplines and periods.

== Art criticism ==
- Mani Madhava Chakyar (1899–1990)

== Poetry ==
- Arnos Paathiri (1681–1732)
- Cherusseri Namboothiri
- Irayimman Thampi
- Kattakayam Cherian Mappillai (1859–1936)
- Kerala Varma Valiya Koyithampuran
- K. C. Kesava Pillai (1868–1914)
- Kunchan Nambiar (1705–1770)
- Kumaran Asan (1873–1924)
- Kutty Kunju Thankachi
- Niranam poets
- Poonthanam Namboothiri
- Thunchaththu Ezhuthachan
- Ulloor S Parameswara Iyer (1877–1949)
- Unnayi Warrier
- Vallathol Narayana Menon (1878–1958)

=== Modern Romantics ===
- Bodheswaran
- Changampuzha Krishna Pillai (1911–1948)
- Edappalli Raghavan Pillai (1909–1936)
- M.P.Appan
- Pala Narayanan Nair
- Pallathu Raman (1892–1950)
- P. Kunhiraman Nair (1906–1978)
- Vennikkulam Gopala Kurup

=== Other modern poets ===
- Akkitham
- Attoor Ravi Varma
- A. Ayyappan
- Ayyappa Panicker
- Balachandran Chullikkadu
- Chandiroor Divakaran
- Edasseri
- G. Shankara Kurup (1900–1978)
- Kadammanitta
- Kadathanat Madhavi Amma
- Kureepuzha Sreekumar
- Lalitha Lenin
- V Madhusoodanan Nair
- M. Govindan
- Mary John Thottam
- Nellikkal Muraleedharan
- N. V. Krishna Warrier
- Olappamanna
- O. N. V. Kurup
- Punaloor Balan
- Satchidanandan
- Sugathakumari
- Thirunalloor Karunakaran
- Vayalar Ramavarma
- Vinayachandran
- Vishnunarayanan Namboothiri
- Vyloppilli (1911–1985)

=== Post-modern poets ===
- Anvar Ali
- A. Ayyappan
- A. C. Sreehari
- Kalpatta Narayanan
- Kureepuzha Sreekumar
- Kavitha Balakrishnan
- Manoj Kuroor
- Mohanakrishnan Kaladi
- M.S. Banesh
- Rafeeq Ahamed
- Rajesh Chithira
- P. P. Ramachandran
- T. P. Rajeevan
- Sathish Kalathil
- Satyan Madakkara
- S. Joseph
- Syam Sudhakar
- T. P. Rajeevan
- V. M. Girija
- Veerankutty
- K Shareef

== Fiction ==
=== Early period ===
- Ambadi Narayana Poduval (1871–1936)
- Appu Nedungadi (1863–1933)
- C. Kunhirama Menon (M. R. K. C.) (1882–1939)
- C. S. Gopala Panicker (1872–1940)
- C. V. Raman Pillai (1858–1922)
- Moorkoth Kumaran (1874–1941)
- O. Chandhu Menon (1847–1900)
- Vengayil Kunhiraman Nayanar (1860–1914)

=== Modern ===
- Anand
- Ashitha
- Basheer (1908–1994)
- Benyamin
- Chandramathi
- C. Radhakrishnan
- C. V. Kunhiraman
- E. Harikumar
- Geetha Hiranyan
- George Joseph K.
- George Onakkur
- Hassan Thikkodi
- Joy J. Kaimaparamban
- Kakkanadan (1935–2011)
- Karur (1898–1974)
- Kovilan
- K. Saraswathi Amma (1919–1974)
- K. Surendran
- Lalithambika Antharjanam (1909–1987)
- Madhavikkutti (Kamala Das)
- Malayatoor Ramakrishnan (1927–1997)
- M. Mukundan
- M. P. Narayana Pillai
- M. T. Vasudevan Nair
- Nandanar
- N. S. Madhavan
- N. P. Mohammed
- O. V. Vijayan (1930–2005)
- P. Padmarajan (1945–1991)
- Parappurath (K.E. Mathai)
- Pattathuvila
- P. F. Mathews
- P. K. Balakrishnan (1926–1991)
- Ponjikkara Rafi
- Ponkunnam Varkey (1908–2004)
- Kesava Dev (1904–1983)
- P. M. Taj (1956–1990)
- P. R. Shyamala
- Priya A. S.
- Sachidanandan
- Shahina EK
- Sreekumari Ramachandran (born 1950)
- S. K. Pottekkatt (1913–1982)
- Subhash Chandran
- T. D. Ramakrishnan
- Thakazhi Sivasankara Pillai (1914–1999)
- T. Padmanabhan
- T. V. Kochubava
- Uroob (1915–1979)
- Vaikom Chandrasekharan Nair
- V. J. James
- V. K. N. (1932–2004)
- V. P. Sivakumar
- Zacharia

=== Post-modern fiction ===
- Anoop Sasikumar
- G. R. Indugopan
- Pradeep
- S. Hareesh
- Socrates K. Valath

== Playwrights ==
- C. J. Thomas
- C. L. Jose
- C. N. Sreekantan Nair
- G. Sankara Pillai
- Kainikkara Kumara Pillai
- Kainikkara Padmanabha Pillai
- S. L. Puram Sadanandan
- Thikkodiyan
- Thoppil Bhasi
- T. N. Gopinathan Nair

== Children's literature ==
- P. Narendranath
- Shebaly
- Sippy Pallippuram
- Sumangala

== Essayists ==
- Annie Thayyil
- C. N. Ahmad Moulavi
- K. M. George
- Puthezhath Raman Menon
- R. Narayana Panickar
- Sanjayan
- S. Guptan Nair
- Sabeena Rafi
- Sooranad Kunjan Pillai
- Sukumar Azhikode
- T. M. Chummar
- V. V. K. Valath

== Literary criticism ==
- K.Damodaran (1912–1976)
- Kesari Balakrishna Pillai (1889–1960)
- K. M. Daniel (1920–1988)
- K. P. Appan (1936–2008)
- Kuttikrishna Marar (1900–1973)
- Kuttipuzha Krishna Pillai
- M. Achuthan (1930–2017)
- M. Krishnan Nair
- M. K. Sanu
- M. Leelavathy
- M. N. Vijayan (1930–2007)
- M. P. Paul (1904–1952)
- M.R. Chandrasekharan
- Mundasseri (1901–1977)
- Narendra Prasad (1946–2003)
- P. K. Narayana Pillai
- S. Guptan Nair (1919–2006)
- S. Rajasekharan
- Sukumar Azhikode (1926–2012)
- V. C. Sreejan
- P. K. Rajasekharan

== Film criticism ==
- C. S. Venkiteswaran
- Kozhikodan
- Vijayakrishnan

== Translation ==
- Leela Devi
- M. K. Kumaran
- M. N. Sathyaardhi
- Nileena Abraham
- N. K. Damodaran
- V. Unnikrishnan Nair

Asokakumar Edasseri P. J. J. Antony

== Others ==
- Hermann Gundert
- Jyesthadevan
- Kottarathil Sankunni
- Krishna Chaithanya

== See also ==
- Malayalam literature
