= List of Malayalam-language authors =

List of Malayalam-language authors lists writers in Malayalam. References for the information appear on the linked Wikipedia pages. The list is incomplete – please help to expand it by adding writers who have written extensively in any genre or field, including science and scholarship. Please follow the entry format.

This list follows alphabetical order. See the List of Malayalam-language writers by category for a more comprehensive list.

- A. Ayyappan
- Akbar Kakkattil
- Akkitham
- Ambadi Ikkavamma
- Ambikasuthan Mangad
- Anand
- Anil Panachooran
- Annie Thayyil
- Anoop Sasikumar
- Arnos Pathiri
- Ashitha
- Attoor Ravi Varma
- Ayyappa Paniker
- Balachandran Chullikkadu
- Bodheswaran
- C. J. Thomas
- C. L. Jose
- C. N. Ahmad Moulavi
- C. N. Sreekantan Nair
- C. Radhakrishnan
- C. V. Balakrishnan
- C. V. Kunjiraman
- C. V. Raman Pillai
- C. V. Sreeraman
- Chandiroor Divakaran
- Changampuzha Krishna Pillai
- D. Babu Paul
- D. Vinayachandran
- E. Harikumar
- E. V. Krishna Pillai
- E. Vasu
- Edappally Raghavan Pillai
- Edasseri Govindan Nair
- G. Sankara Pillai
- Geetha Hiranyan
- George Joseph K.
- Gireesh Puthenchery
- Gracy
- Hussain Karadi
- I. C. Chacko
- Jisa Jose
- Jithu Nair
- Jose Panachippuram
- John Paul Puthusery
- K. Jayakumar
- K. M. George
- K. N. Panicker
- K. P. Appan
- K. V. Thomas
- Kadammanitta Ramakrishnan
- Kadathanat Madhavi Amma
- Kainikkara Kumara Pillai
- Kainikkara Padmanabha Pillai
- Kakkanadan
- Kalamandalam Hyderali
- Kamala Surayya
- Kesari Balakrishna Pillai
- Kilimanur Ramakanthan
- Kottarathil Sankunni
- Kottayam Pushpanath
- Kovilan
- Kumaranasan
- Kunjunni
- Kureepuzha Sreekumar
- Kuttipuzha Krishna Pillai
- Kutty Kunju Thankachi
- Lalithambika Antharjanam
- Lajo Jose
- Leela Devi
- M. Achuthan
- M. Govindan
- M. Krishnan Nair
- M. Leelavathy
- M. Mukundan
- M. N. Vijayan
- M. P. Narayana Pillai
- M. P. Veerendrakumar
- M. Sukumaran
- M. T. Vasudevan Nair
- M. V. Devan
- M. G. S. Narayanan
- Madhupal
- Malayattur Ramakrishnan
- Mali Madhavan Nair
- Manoj Kuroor
- Mary John Thottam
- Melppathoor Narayana Bhattathiri
- Muttathu Varkey
- N. N. Kakkad
- N. N. Pillai
- N. P. Muhammed
- N. S. Madhavan
- N. Prabhakaran
- N. V. Krishna Warrior
- Narayan
- Narayana Guru
- Nitya Chaitanya Yati
- O. Chandu Menon
- O. N. V. Kurup
- O. V. Vijayan
- Olappamanna
- P Kesavadev
- P. C. Sanal Kumar
- P. F. Mathews
- P. K. Balakrishnan
- P. K. Gopi
- P. K. Narayana Pillai
- P. Narendranath
- P. Padmarajan
- P. R. Shyamala
- P. Valsala
- Paipra Radhakrishnan
- Pala Narayanan Nair
- Pallathu Raman
- Pamman
- Pandalam Kerala Varma
- Paremmakkal Thoma Kathanar
- Pattathuvila Karunakaran
- Perumbadavam Sreedharan
- Ponjikkara Rafi
- Poonthanam
- Premji
- Priya A. S.
- Prof. N . Krishna Pillai
- Punathil Kunjabdulla
- Puthezhath Raman Menon
- R. Narayana Panickar
- Rajalakshmi
- Rajesh Chithira
- S. Hareesh
- S. K. Pottekkatt
- S. L. Puram Sadanandan
- S. Rajasekharan
- S. Ramesan Nair
- Sabeena Rafi
- Santhosh Echikkanam
- Sara Joseph
- Satchidanandan
- Sethu
- Shahina EK
- Sippy Pallippuram
- Socrates K. Valath
- Sooranad Kunjan Pillai
- Sreekumaran Thampi
- Subhash Chandran
- Sugathakumari
- Sukumar
- Sukumar Azhikode
- Sumangala
- T. D. Ramakrishnan
- T. M. Chummar
- T. N. Gopinathan Nair
- T. V. Kochubava
- Thakazhi Sivasankara Pillai
- Thikkodian
- Thirunalloor Karunakaran
- Thomas Joseph
- Thoppil Bhasi
- Thunchaththu Ramanujan Ezhuthachan
- U. K. Kumaran
- Ulloor S. Parameswara Iyer
- Unnayi Warrier
- Unnikrishnan Puthoor
- Uroob
- V. Balakrishnan
- V. C. Sreejan
- V. J. James
- V. K. N
- V.K.K.RAMESH
- V. Madhusoodhanan Nair
- V. M. Girija
- V. P. Sivakumar
- V. R. Krishna Iyer
- V.T.Bhatathirippad
- V. Unnikrishnan Nair
- V. V. K. Valath
- Vaikom Muhammed Basheer
- Vailoppilli Sreedhara Menon
- Vallathol Narayana Menon
- Vayalar Ramavarma
- Veloor Krishnan Kutty
- Vennikkulam Gopala Kurup
- Vijayakrishnan
- Vijayalakshmi
- Yusafali Kechery
