= Chithira =

Chithira may refer to:

- Chaitra, traditionally the first month of the Hindu calendar
- Chithira Thirunal Balarama Varma (1912–1991), Indian monarch
- Rajesh Chithira, Indian poet
- Atham Chithira Chothy, 1986 Indian film directed by A. T. Abu

== See also ==
- Chitra (disambiguation)
- Chithiram Pesuthadi (disambiguation)
- Chithiram TV, Indian television channel
- Chithram, 1988 Indian Malayalam-language film by Priyadarshan
- Chithramela, 1967 Indian film
- Chithirai Pookkal, 1991 Indian film
- Chithirayil Nilachoru, 2013 Indian film
- Chithirai Sevvaanam, 2021 Indian film
- Chithirai Thiruvizha, Hindu festival in Madurai, India
- Chithramia, genus of fungi
