= Valath =

Valath is a surname. Notable people with the surname include:

- Socrates K. Valath (born 1963), Indian novelist
- V. V. K. Valath (1918–2000), Indian writer
