= Rajasekhara =

Rajasekhara may refer to:

- Rama Rajasekhara/Cheraman Perumal "Nayanar" (fl. 9th century), theologian, devotional poet and ruler from south India
- Rajashekhara (Sanskrit poet) (fl. 10th century), Sanskrit poet, dramatist and critic
- Y. S. Rajasekhara Reddy (1949–2009), known as YSR, Indian politician

== See also ==
- Rajasekhar (disambiguation)
- S. Rajasekharan (born 1946), Indian literary critic and poet
