= R. Ramachandran =

R. Ramachandran may refer to:

- R. Ramachandran (poet)
- R. Ramachandran (politician)
