= Chitra =

Chitra may refer to:

== Art ==
- Chitra (art), a historic art that includes paintings, sketching with or without multiple colors

== People ==
- K. S. Chithra, Indian playback singer
- Chitra (actress), Indian film actress (1965-2021)
- V. J. Chitra, Indian television actress (1992-2020)
- Chitra Bahadur K.C., Nepalese politician
- Chitra Banerjee Divakaruni (born 1956), Indian-American author, poet, and professor of English
- Chitra Bharucha (born 1945), former Consultant Haematologist and Vice Chair of the BBC Trust
- Chitra Dewi (1934–2008), Indonesian actress
- Chitra Ganesh (born 1975), artist based in Brooklyn, New York
- Chitra Jeremiah (born 1971), Nauruan diplomat
- Chitra Lekha Yadav, Nepalese politician
- Chitra Mudgal (born 1944), literary figure in modern Hindi literature
- Chitra Sarwara (born 1975), Indian politician from Haryana
- Chitra Singh (born 1945), female ghazal singer
- Chitra Soman (born 1983), Indian sprinter
- Chitra Subramaniam (born 1958), Indian journalist
- Chithira Thirunal Balarama Varma (1912–1991), also Sree Chitra Thirunal, Indian monarch, last ruling Maharajah of Travancore from 1924–1949
- Chitra Visweswaran, classical dancer

== Zoology ==
- Chitra (turtle), a turtle genus from Asia
- Sandfly, a biting fly found in sandy areas

== Institutions ==
- Sree Chitra Thirunal Institute for Medical Sciences and Technology, Thiruvananthapuram, India
- Sree Chitra Thirunal College of Engineering, Thiruvananthapuram, India

== Other uses ==
- Chitra (1946 film), a 1946 Indian Tamil-language film
- Chitra (2001 film), a 2001 Indian Kannada-language film, a remake of the 2000 Telugu film Chitram
- Chitra (play), a 1914 play by Rabindranath Tagore
- Chitra nakshatra, in Hindu astrology, a nakshatra (lunar mansion) corresponding to the constellation Spica
- Chitra River, a river in the Narail District of southwestern Bangladesh
- Chitrakar, painters and mask makers
- Chitra, a 1960 ballet by Niyazi
- Chitra, Deoghar, a village in Jharkhand, India

== See also ==
- Chithira (disambiguation)
- Chithra (disambiguation)
- Chithiram Pesuthadi (disambiguation)
- Chitram, a 2000 Indian Telugu-language film
- Chithram, a 1988 Indian Malayalam-language film by Priyadarshan
