= T. M. Chummar =

Indian academic and writer (1899–1987)

- Born: 13 October 1899; Varappuzha, Kingdom of Cochin
- Died: 17 February 1987 (aged 87); Kerala
- Occupations: Writer, academic
- Spouse: Brigitha
- Awards: 1955 Sahityaalankara; 1960 Sahitya Nipunan; 1986 Kerala Sahitya Akademi Fellowship

Thattarassery Mathai Chummar (13 October 1899 – 17 February 1987), commonly identified as T. M. Chummar, was an Indian academic and writer of Malayalam literature, best known for his books on its history. An associate of G. Sankara Kurup and Vailoppilli Sreedhara Menon, Chummar's books on Kunchan Nambiar and C. V. Raman Pillai detail their literary contributions. He was a recipient of the title Sahitya Nipunan, conferred on him by the Rajah of Cochin. The Kerala Sahitya Akademi honoured him with the distinguished fellowship in 1986.

== Biography ==
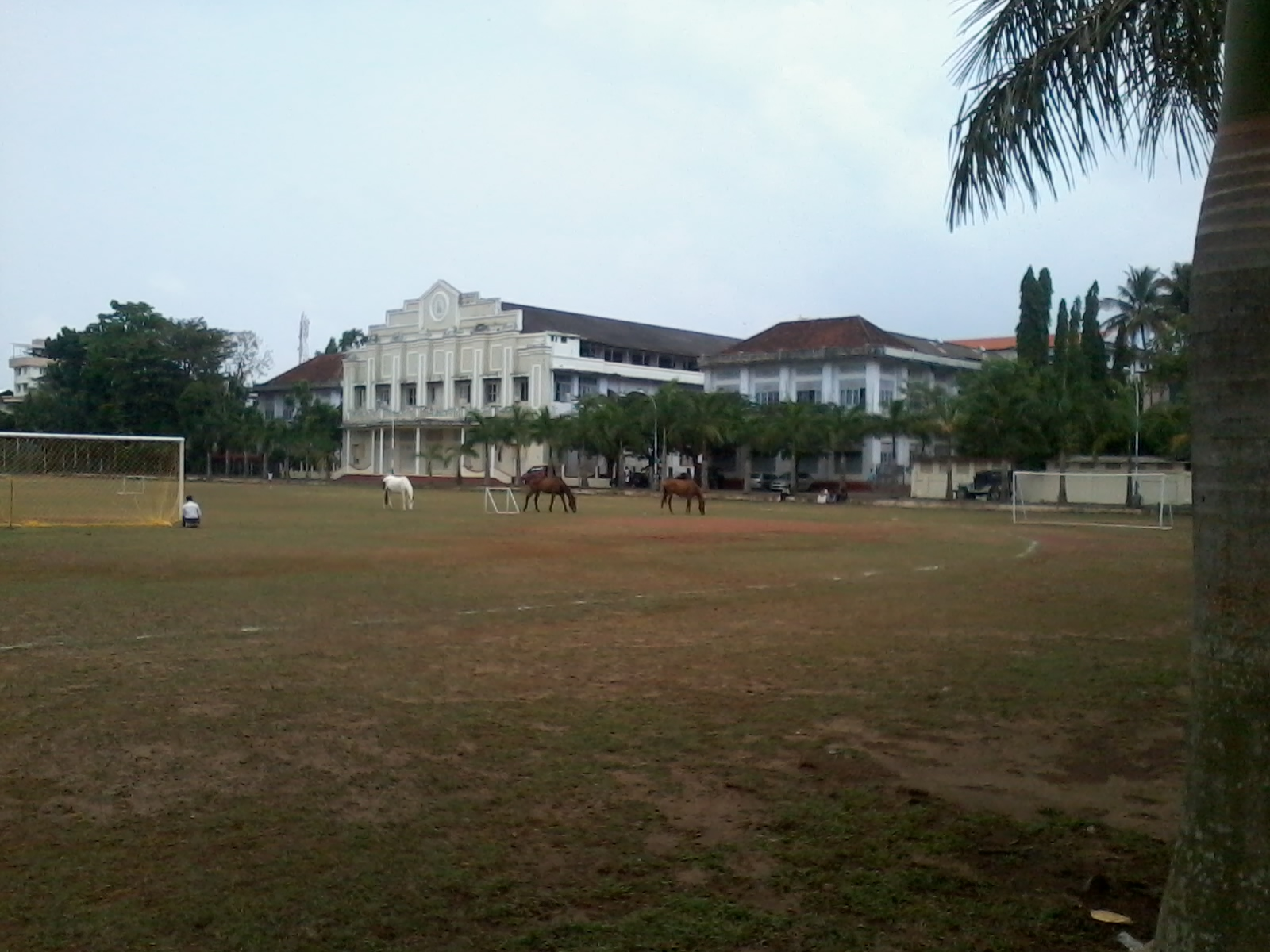
Sacred Heart College, Thevara

T. M. Chummar was born on 13 October 1899, at Chirakkakam in Varappuzha, an islet in Ernakulam district of the south Indian state of Kerala to Thattarasserry Mathai Asan and Thressia. His early education was from his father who was an ayurvedic physician and after learning the basics of Ayurveda and Sanskrit, he passed the Travancore Elementary School Leaving Certificate examination from a school in North Paravur. Subsequently, he started his career as a teacher and worked at various schools in and around Kochi, starting from the school in Varappuzha and moving to Edapally, Koonammavu, Manjummel and Munambam. He continued his studies simultaneously to pass the higher training, pundit and vidwan examinations, the last one in 1935 from Madras and joined Sacred Heart School, Thevara, only to shift to Sacred Heart College, Thevara, as a lecturer, in 1937 where he became the head of the department of Malayalam in 1942, a post he held until his superannuation from service in 1962.

Chummar was married to Kunnathuveettil Brigitha from Kottuvally. He died on 17 February 1987, at the age of 87.

== Legacy and honours ==
Chummar was associated with several major literary figures such as G. Sankara Kurup, Vailoppilli Sreedhara Menon and A. D. Hari Sharma and they worked together for promoting Samastha Kerala Sahitya Parishad, a Kochi based literary organization, where Chummar served as a committee member and as a vice president. He also served as the editor of the magazine published by the Parishad for a while. He published Baasha Vriththavum Samskritha Vriththavum in 1928 which was his first noteworthy article which was followed by several in Kairali magazine. He published his first book, Padhyasahithya Charithram, in 1936, which was one for the early writings on the history of Malayalam literature and the book was note for its content. He also published another noted work on literary history in 1955 under the title, Gadhya Sahithya Charithram. Besides publishing a number of books on literature, he also published three critiques on major poets; Mahakavi Kunchan Nambiar, C. V. yude Akhyayikakal, and Kavithilakan K. P. Karuppan.

Ayodhya Sanskrit Parishad awarded Chummar the title of Sahityaalankara in 1955 and the Rajah of Cochin conferred the title of Sahitya Nipunan on him in 1960. Kerala Sahitya Akademi honoured him with the distinguished fellowship in 1986.

== Bibliography ==
- Chummar T. M (1936). Padya sahithya Charithram. Kottayam: National Book Stall.
- Chummar T. M (1955). Bhasha gadya sahitya charitram. Kottayam: National Book Stall.
- Chummar. T. M (1959). Chinthapatham. Current Bks. Trichur: Current Books.
- Chummar. T. M (1968). Gadhya Sourabham. Narasimha Vilasam, Thuravur: Narasimha Vilasam.
- Chummar, T. M. (1969). Suvarna kairali.
- Chummar. T. M (1971). Sadhara Smaranakal. Auroville Publ: Auroville Pub.
- Chummar T. M (1971). Sadarasmaranakal. Kottayam: Vidhyarthimithram.
- Chummar. T. M (1972). Mahakavi Kunjan Nambiar. Auroville: Auroville Pub.
- Chummar, T. M. (1973). C V yude Akhyayikakal. Vidyarthimithram.
- Chummar. T. M (1974). Kavithilakan K. P. Karuppan. Sahithya Pra. Co. s: Sahithya Pra. Co. s.
- T. M. Chummar (1980). Kaviramayanayuddham. Cummar; Kottayam : vitaranam, National Book Stall.

== See also ==
- List of Malayalam-language authors by category
- List of Malayalam-language authors
