= Kadathanat Madhavi Amma =

Indian poet, novelist (1909–1999)

- Born: 15 June 1909; Iringannur, Kozhikode, Kerala, India
- Died: 24 December 1999 (aged 90); Kerala, India
- Occupations: Poet, novelist, short story writer
- Spouse: A. K. Kunjukrishnan Nambiar
- Children: Bharathi Amma, Chandrika, Shyamala, Annapoornna
- Parents: Thiruvoth Kunjikanna Kurup; Kalyani Amma
- Writing career
- Notable works: Kavyopaharam; Kanikkonna; Gramashreekal; Oru Pidi Aval
- Notable awards: 1996 Kerala Sahitya Akademi Award for Overall Contributions; Changampuzha Award; Ramashramam Award

Kadathanat Madhavi Amma (15 June 1909 – 24 December 1999) was an Indian poet, novelist and short story writer of Malayalam literature. Known for poetry anthologies such as Kalyopaharam and Kanikkonna, she was also the author of two works based on Vadakkan Pattukal viz. Thacholi Othenan and Payyamvelli Chandu. The Kerala Sahitya Akademi awarded her their annual award for overall contributions in 1996.

== Biography ==
Madhavi Amma was born on 15 June 1909 at Iringannur, a small village near Vatakara, in Kozhikode district of the south Indian state of Kerala to Thiruvoth Kunjikanna Kurup and Keezhpalli Kalyani Amma. The conservative way of life in Malabar region during those times allowed only limited education to girls and she had her formal education only up to 5th standard at a local elementary school but she received informal education from Kadathanattu Krishna Warrier in Sanskrit and from Moyyareth Sankaran in modern thoughts.

Madhavi Amma started writing under the name, Pullancheri Madhavi, which she changed to Kadathanattu Madhavi Amma later. Her oeuvre comprises five poetry anthologies, two novels, two folk tales, a short story anthology and a short biography. Jeevitha thanthukkal, Kavyopaharam, Gramashreekal, Kanikkonna, Muthassante Kannuneeru and Orupiti Avilu are some of her notable works and her poems have been compiled under one title, Kadahanattu Madhaviammyute Kavithakal (1990).

Madhavi Amma was married to A. K. Kunjukrishnan Nambiar, a relative of the noted communist leader and politician, and the couple had four daughters and two sons; Bharathi, Chandrika, Shyamala, Annapoornna, Raghunath and Babu. She died on 24 December 1999 at the age of 90. Her life has been documented in a biography, written by Kadathanattu Narayanan and published by Kerala Sahithya Akademi under the title, Madhavi Amma: Kavithayude Graamasree.

== Awards and honours ==
The Kerala Sahitya Akademi awarded Madhavi Amma the annual award for overall contributions in 1996. She was also a recipient of the Changampuzha Award and Ramashramam Award.

== Selected bibliography ==
=== Poetry ===
- Madhavi Amma, Kadathanaattu (1990). Kadathanaattu Madhavi Ammayude kavithakal (in Malayalam). Kozhikode: Mathrubhumi.
- Kadathanattu, Madhavi Amma (1985). Oru pidi avalu (in Malayalam). Kozhikode: P. K. Brothers.
- Madhavi Amma, Kadathanaattu (1981). Muthachante kannuneeru (in Malayalam). Poorna Publication. p. 91.
- Madhavi Amma, Kadathanaattu (1969). Kanikkonna (in Malayalam). Sahitya Pravarthaka Co-operative Society. p. 111.
- Madhavi Amma, Kadathanaattu. Kaalopahaaram (in Malayalam).
- Madhavi Amma, Kadathanaattu. Gramashreekal (in Malayalam).

=== Novel ===
- Madhavi Amma, Kadathanaattu. Veerakesari (in Malayalam). p. 200.
- Madhavi Amma, Kadathanaattu. Madhavikutty (in Malayalam).

=== Folk tale ===
- Madhavi Amma, Kadathanattu. Thacholi Othenan (in Malayalam). Poorna Publications. p. 120. ISBN 9788130018843.
- Madhavi Amma, Kadathanattu. Payyamvelli Chandhu (in Malayalam). Poorna Publications. p. 76. ISBN 9788130018843.

=== Short story ===
- Madhavi Amma, Kadathanaattu (1956). Jeevitha thanthukkal (in Malayalam). P. K. Brothers.

=== Biography ===
- Madhavi Amma, Kadathanaattu. Shree Ramananda Gurudevan (in Malayalam).

== See also ==
- List of Malayalam-language authors by category
- List of Malayalam-language authors

== Notes ==
(Note: Please see Selected bibliography section)

- "Malayala Sahithyakaranmar". 2012.
