= M. S. Banesh =

Indian documentary film maker

M.S. Banesh is an Indian poet and novelist writing in Malayalam. He is also a documentary filmmaker and journalist. Banesh received the Kerala State Television Award for Best Anchor/Interviewer (Current Affairs) at the Kerala State Television Awards 2023, for his programme Truecaller.

== Life ==
M. S. Banesh was born at Kodungallur in Thrissur District in Kerala. He postgraduated in Malayalam Language and Literature from Maharaja's College, Ernakulam.

== Writing career ==
M. S. Banesh's first collection of poems, Nenchum Virichu Thala Kunikkunnu, published by DC Books in 2007. Banesh's poetry collections include Kaathu Shikshikkane (published by DC Books in 2012), Nallayinam Pulaya Acharukal (published by DC Books in 2017) and Perakkavadi (published by DC Books in 2022). His novel, His debut novel, Jalabhara Dinarathrangal (rendered in English as Watery Days and Nights), was published in 2022. His second novel Premalepanam was also published by DC Books in 2025.
