= Nileena Abraham =

Indian translator, writer

- Born: 27 July 1925 (age 101); India
- Occupations: Writer, translator

Nileena Abraham (née Dutta) (born 27 July 1925) is a writer and translator from Kerala, India. She was born in Pabna. After earning master's degrees in Bengali language, political science and history, she moved to Kerala and worked as a professor of Bengali at Maharaja's College, Ernakulam and as the Dr. Suniti Kumar Chatterji Professor of Bengali at International School of Dravidian Linguistics, Thiruvananthapuram.

== Works ==
She has translated more than eight Bengali works into Malayalam and ten Malayalam works into Bengali. She was awarded the Sahitya Akademi Translation Prize in 1989 for Bengali translation of Pathummayude Adu and Balyakalasakhi, a collection of Malayalam short stories by Vaikom Muhammad Basheer. She lives in Ernakulam and is married to Abraham Tharyan.

== Partial bibliography ==
=== Translations into Malayalam ===
- Arogyaniketan
- Ezhu Chuvadu
- Irumpazhikal(In 2 parts)
- Midhunalagnam
- Avan Varunnu
