= V. M. Girija =

Indian poet and essayist

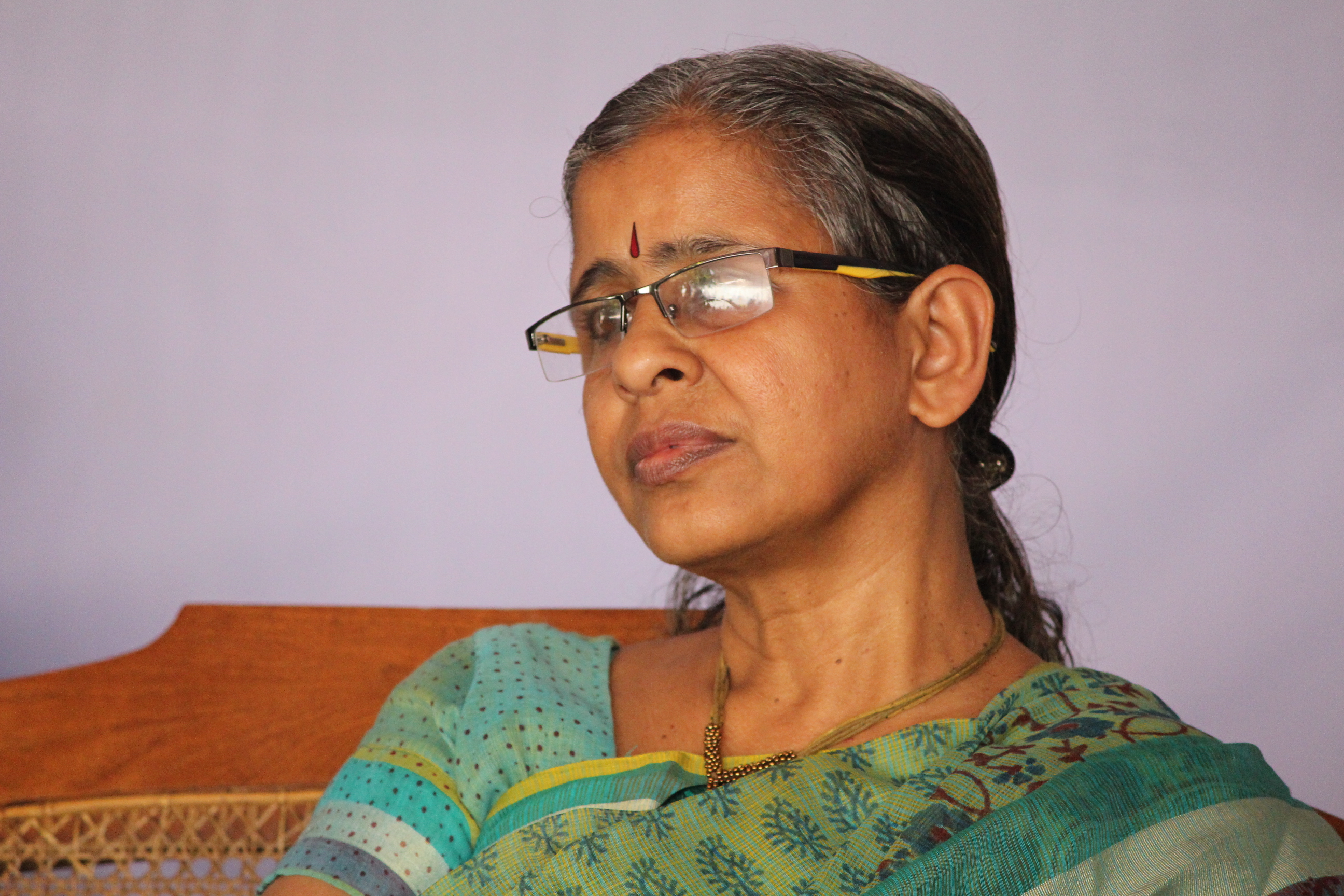
- Born: 27 July 1961 (age 65); Paruthipra, Palakkadu, Kerala, India
- Occupations: Poet, essayist
- Spouse: C. R. Neelakandan
- Children: two daughters
- Relatives: Vasudevan Bhattathirippad (father); Gauri (mother)
- Awards: 2018 Kerala Sahitya Akademi Award for Poetry; Changampuzha Award; Asan Smaraka Kavitha Puraskaram; Mahakavi Pandalam Keralavarma Puraskaram

V. M. Girija (born 27 July 1961) is an Indian poet and essayist, writing in Malayalam language. She has published a number of books, which include Prem - Ek Album, the Hindi translation of her poetry anthology in Malayalam, Pranayam Oralbum. Kerala Sahithya Akademi awarded her their 2018 annual award for poetry and she is a recipient of Changampuzha Award for literature, Basheer Amma Malayalam Puraskaram, Asan Smaraka Kavitha Puraskaram, Ezhuthola K V Karthikeyan Puraskaram and Mahakavi Pandalam Keralavarma Puraskaram.

== Biography ==
Vatakkeppattu Manakkal Girija was born on July 27, 1961, to Vadakkeppattu Vasudevan Bhattathirippad and Gauri, at Paruthipra, a village near Shornur in Palakkad district in the south Indian state of Kerala. Her college education was at the Sanskrit College, Pattambi from where she earned a master's degree in Malayalam, securing first rank in the examination. She started writing at an early age and her early poems were published in Balapankthi of Mathrubhumi. She started her career in 1983 by joining All India Radio as an announcer and moved to Kochi FM Station when it was started in 1989. She retired from Kochi FM in 2021 after 38 years of service.

Girija has published eleven books of which Pranayam Oralbum has been translated into Hindi by A. Aravindakshan, under the title, Prem-Ek Album. The other books are Jeevajalam (Current Books, 2004), Paavayunu (Sign Books, 2007), Pennugal Kanatha Pathira Neragal (Mathrubhumi Books, 2011), Oridathoridathoridathu (Current Books, 2012), Poochayurakkam (KSCIL, 2014), Kadaloraveedu (Logos Books, 2015), Paavayoonu (Illustrated Version-Kerala Sasthra Sahithya Parishad, 2015), Irupakshampeduminduvalla Njan, Moonu Deerkha Kavithakal (DC Books, 2017), Buddhapoornima, and The Black Stone, a translation of her poems into English by P. P. Raveendran. She has also edited book, Ellaarudeyum bhoomi, a compilation of poems of Savithri Antharjanam, and has translated the Portuguese novel, Meu Pé de Laranja Lima (English: My Sweet Orange Tree) into Malayalam under the name, Ente Panchara Orange Maram. Her latest work is Ee Valliyil Ninnu Chemme, a children's novel, published by Mathrubhumi Books.

== Personal life ==
Girija is married to C. R. Neelakandan, a noted environmental activist. The couple has two daughters, Ardra Neelakandan Girija and Archa Neelakandan Girija and the family lives in Kakkanadu in Kochi.

== Awards and honours ==
Girija received the 2018 Kerala Sahitya Akademi Award for Poetry for her anthology, Budha Purnima. She has also received the 'Changmpuzha Award for literature' and the 'Basheer Amma Malayalam Puraskaram' and one of her books is a prescribed academic text for graduate course in Malayalam at the University of Calicut. She received Asan Smaraka Kavitha Puraskaram in 2024 and Ezhuthola K V Karthikeyan Puraskaram as well as Mahakavi Pandalam Keralavarma Puraskaram in 2025.

== Bibliography ==
- Pranayam Oralbum (1997)
- Prem-Ek Album (1999)
- Jeevajalam (2003)
- Paavayunu (2007)
- Pennugal Kanatha Pathira Neragal (2011)
- Oridathoridathoridathu (2012)
- Poochayurakkam (2014)
- Kadaloraveedu (2015)
- Paavayoonu (Illustrated Version, 2015)
- Irupakshampeduminduvalla Njan (2015)
- Moonu Deerkha Kavithakal(2017)
- Buddhapoornima (2017)
- Poovennu Perulla Poocha (2018)
- Sparsham (2021)
- Ente Panchara Orange Maram (2023)
- Kaadanavanuduppum Veedum (2024)
- Chiramannur to Shoranur: Oru Desavazhiyute Katha (2025)
- Ee Valliyil Ninnu Chemme (2026)

== See also ==
- List of Malayalam-language authors by category
- List of Malayalam-language authors
