= C. N. Ahmad Moulavi =

Indian writer

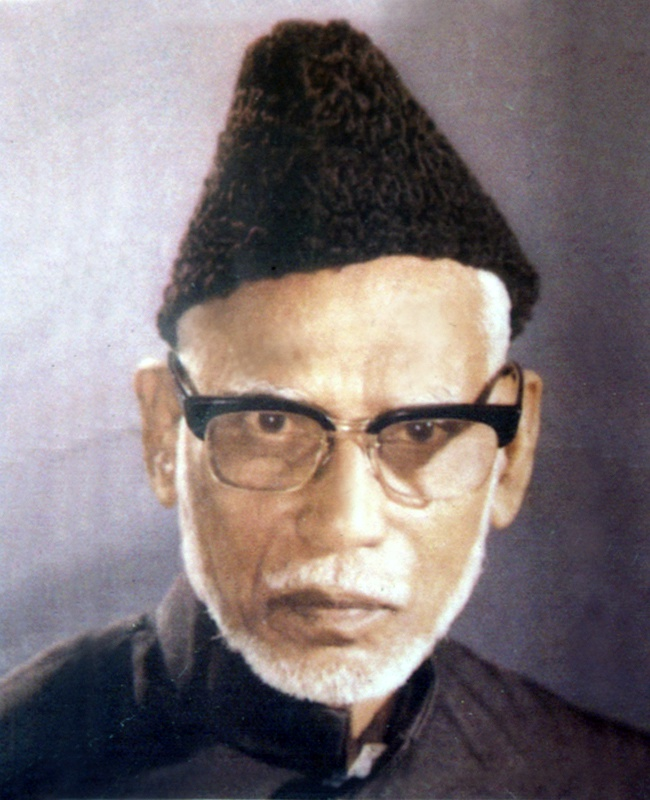
- Born: 1905; Cheroor, Eranad, Malappuram district, British India
- Died: 27 April 1993 (aged 88); Kozhikode, Kerala
- Occupations: Essayist, translator, educationist, social reformer
- Parents: Assan Kutty (father); Khatheeja (mother)
- Awards: 1989 Kerala Sahitya Akademi Fellowship

C. N. Ahmad Moulavi (1905 – 1993) was an Indian writer of Malayalam literature, best known as the translator of the first complete publication of Quran in Malayalam. He was the author of a number of books on Islam and was reported to have contributed to the propagation of education among the Muslims of Malabar region. A member of the Kerala Sahitya Akademi during the period 1959–64, Moulavi was honoured by the academy with the distinguished fellowship in 1989.

== Biography ==
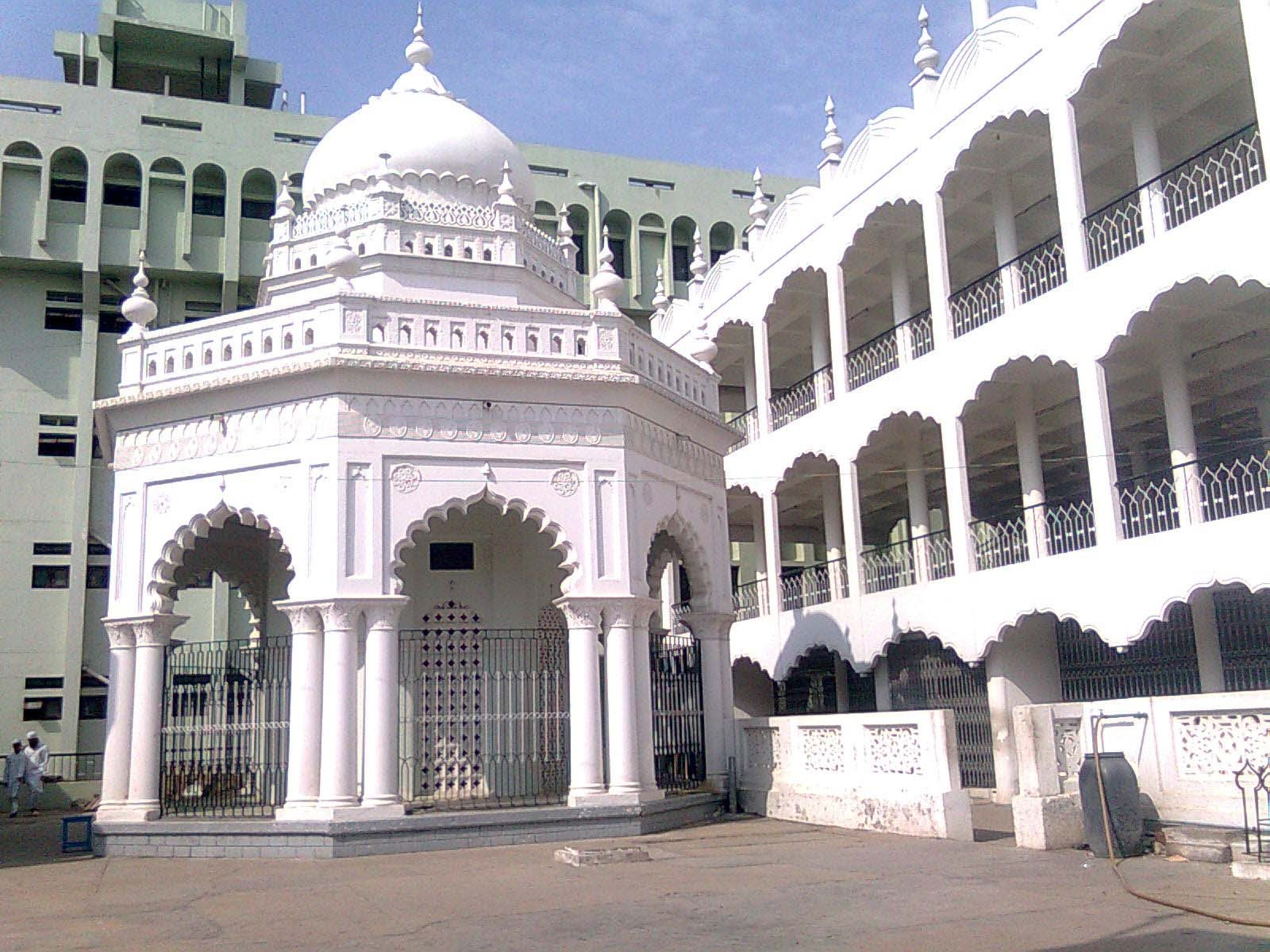
Baqiyat Salihat Arabic College

C. N. Ahmad Moulavi was born in 1905 at Cheroor, a village in Eranad in Malappuram district of the south Indian state of Kerala to Nathankodan Assan Kutty and Azhuvath Khatheeja. Born in a family of poor financial means, he lost his father early and could have primary education for only three years after which he had to work in a farm for sustenance. At the age of sixteen, he went back to studies, first at Karuvarakundu Grand Dars of Kunjalam Musaliar and later under Kattukandan Kunjahmed Musaliar. This was followed by a short stints at the Madras Jamalia Arabic College and Bombay where he studied under K. T. Ibrahim Moulavi, only to proceed to Baqiyat Salihat Arabic College, Vellore in 1928 from where he passed Afsal Ul Ulama examination in 1931. On his return to Kerala, he joined the Malappuram Training School as a religious instructor but resigned from the job in 1944 to start his own clothing business.

Moulavi started a magazine by name, Ansari which became defunct after publishing 14 issues; though he restarted the magazine under a new name, New Ansari in 1955, the publication did not last long. When the East Eranad Education Society was formed in 1964, Moulavi became the founder president of the society; the society, which started Dr. Gafoor Memorial MES Mampad College in 1965, was handed over the Muslim Educational Society (MES) in 1967.

Maulavi died on 27 April 1993, at the age of 88, at Kozhikode.

== Legacy and honours ==
Maulavi published twelve books on Islamic studies, including a reportedly controversial book, Islamile Dhanavitharanapadhathi (Distribution of Wealth in Islam Tradition). He was the first to publish a complete translation of the Quran into Malayalam which he published in 1963, at a time when translation of Quran was considered a blasphemy. He wrote on many contentious issues such as divorce and maintenance among Muslims and his book, Mahathaya Mappila Sahitya Paramparyam (The glorious Mappila Literary Heritage) is a comprehensive work on the Muslim literature in Kerala with details about the contribution of Muslims in the development of Arabic-Malayalam literature. He served as a member of the Kerala Sahitya Akademi for five years from 1959 to 1964. In 1989, he was inducted as a distinguished fellow by the academy. His birth centenary was celebrated in Kozhikode in 2005 and an exhibition of all his writings were organized as a part of it.

== Bibliography ==
- C. N. Ahmed Moulavi (1953). Parishudha Qur'an: Paribhashayum Vyakhyanavum Volume-1 (1 ed.). Perumbavoor: Abdul Majeed Marikar.
- C. N. Ahmed Moulavi. Parishudha Qur'an: Paribhashayum Vyakhyanavum Volume-2.
- C. N. Ahmed Moulavi. Parishudha Qur'an: Paribhashayum Vyakhyanavum Volume-3.
- C. N. Ahmed Moulavi (1954). Islamika Sampathika Shasthram.
- C. N. Ahmed Moulavi (1957). Qur'an: Enthu ? Enthinu ?.
- C. N. Ahmed Moulavi. Qur'an Krodeekaranam, Mansookh, Erinhukollal: Moonnu Vambicha Thettidharanakal (1 ed.). Chevayur, Kozhikode: C.N. Ahmed Moulavi.
- C.N, Ahmmed Moulavi; K.K., Muhammed Abdulkareem (1978). Mahathaya Mappila Sahitya Parampariam.)
- C. N. Ahmed Moulavi (1983). Manuṣhya Jeevithaṃ Anaśvaraṃ (in Malayalam). Calicut: Azad Book Stall. OCLC 17149726.
- C. N. Ahmed Moulavi (1971). Islāṃ charitr̲aṃ (in Malayalam). Calicut: Ansāri Press. OCLC 30629062.

=== Translations into other languages ===
- C. N. Ahmed Moulavi (1979). Religion of Islam: A Comprehensive Study. Azad Book Stall.
- C. N. Ahmed Moulavi (1964). Principles and practice of Islamic Economy. Ansari press.

== See also ==
- List of Malayalam-language authors by category
- List of Malayalam-language authors
