= T. V. R. Shenoy =

Indian journalist (1941–2018)

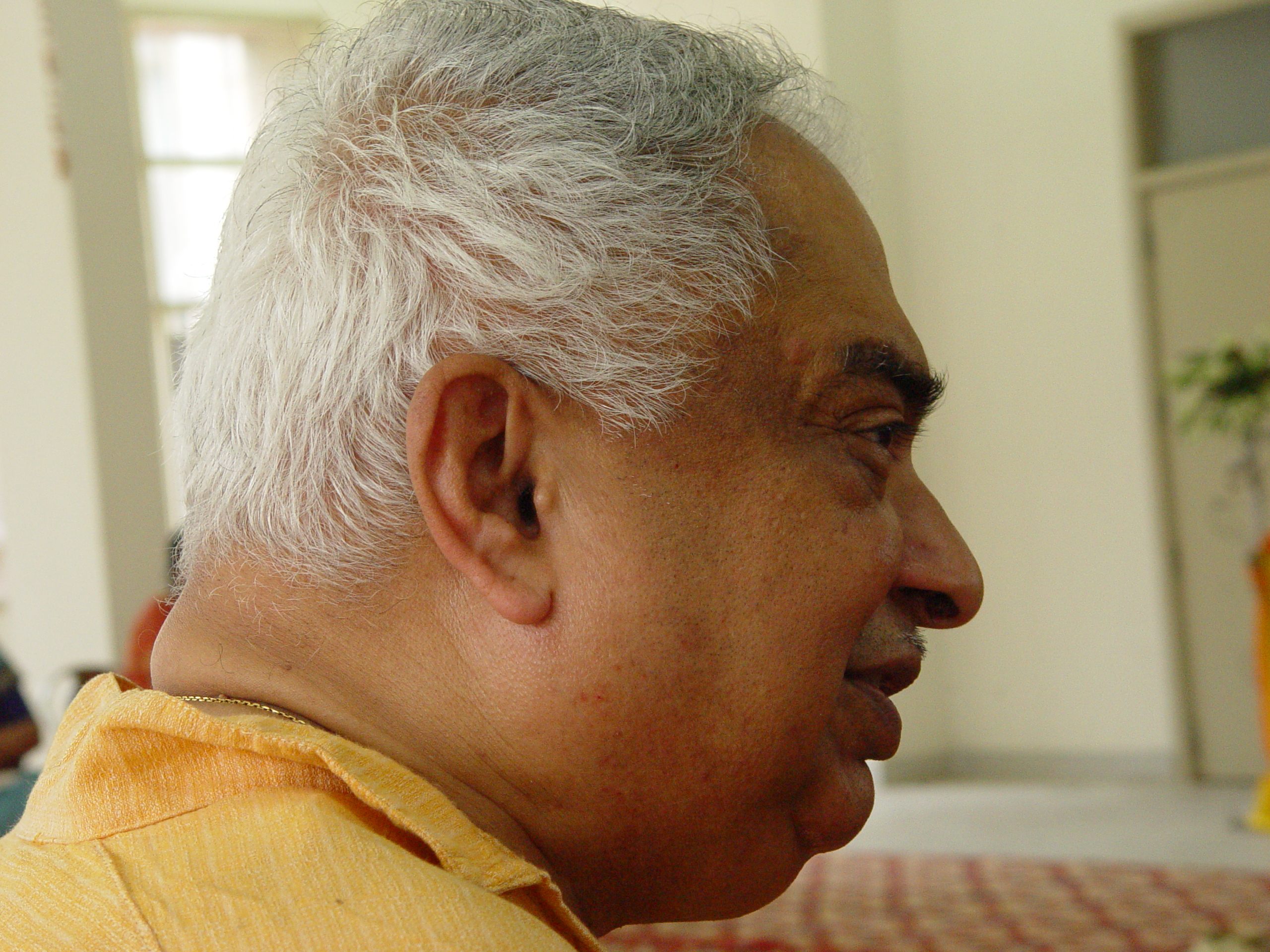
Image of TVR Shenoy

T. V. R. Shenoy (10 June 1941 – 17 April 2018) was a journalist and columnist of India. Shenoy had served as the Editor of the weekly news magazine The Week and Sunday Mail and held various posts in Indian Express and Malayala Manorama.

Shenoy contributed to several national and international newspapers, website and magazines on issues ranging from national politics, economy, social issues, international affairs to current affairs. He regularly contributed articles and opinion to Indian Express, Gulf News, Rediff.com, Newstime and Mathrubhumi and Indiafirstfoundation.org.

He was a native of Cherayi, Ernakulam, Kerala.

He was a member of the board of trustees of India First Foundation. He was awarded the Padma Bhushan award in 2003.

He died on 17 April 2018 at the Kasturba Hospital in Manipal. His wife is Late Saroja Shenoy, who died on April 9th 2023 who was a political sensation in Maharajas College, Ernakulam during 60s. He has a son, Ajit Shenoy, who died on October 13th 2023. He also had a daughter, Sujatha Shenoy, a fellow journalist, and grandchildren Varun and Kaavya Shriram.
