= MP Anil Kumar =

Indian Air Force officer (1964–2014)

Flying Officer MP Anil Kumar
- Born: 5 May 1964; Chirayinkeezhu, Thiruvananthapuram, India
- Died: 20 May 2014 (aged 50); Pune, India
- Military career
- Allegiance: India
- Branch: Indian Air Force
- Nickname: Empee or MP

Flying Officer MP Anil Kumar (5 May 1964 – 20 May 2014) was a MiG 21 pilot in the Indian Air Force; after he became a quadriplegic as a result of a motor-cycle accident, he became a writer and historian. After the accident in 1988 he lived in the Paraplegic Rehabilitation Centre of Pune, where on 20 May 2014 he died.

Kumar learned to write with a pen held in his mouth. An essay he wrote, titled "Airborne to Chairborne", was widely read, and was included in some school textbooks in Maharashtra and Kerala.

== Early life and education ==
M.P. Anil Kumar was born in Chirayinkeezhu, 35 km north of Thiruvananthapuram, Kerala. At the age of 9, he entered Sainik School, Kazhakootam. Later he was being admitted to the 65th course at National Defence Academy.

MP attributed everything he was able to do in life to his Sainik School education and training at the National Defence Academy. In many ways, he exemplified what soldiers can achieve in peace. Modern history is replete with narratives of how nations that do not make enough efforts at peace, so that their soldiers can enjoy a normal lifespan to showcase their unique skills and abilities, will be reduced to chest-thumping jingoists in a land awash with forgotten war widows.

== Accident ==
On 28 June 1988, MP was winding up a usual day at his fighter base in Pathankot after flying a couple of sorties as a wingman to senior pilots. Night flying had just been called off because of thundershowers, and MP, then just 24, was returning to the officers’ mess when he met with a freak bike accident. "In one quirky instant 20 years ago, a mishap reduced me to a wreck of a combat pilot. From the fighter cockpit to a wheelchair, from a bird’s eye view to a worm’s eye view of the world... Life was never the same," he wrote a few years ago.

Working from the Army's Paraplegic Rehabilitation Centre in Pune until he died on 20 May 2014, he used a specially created workstation to type using a pencil held in his mouth, writing commentaries on military issues in India for various publications. Many readers, noted his works for their writing style and precise numbers, were written from memory and without references.

He wrote an essay about his accident in 1994 called Airborne to Chairborne. The text is now used in textbooks in a few state syllabuses.

== Writings and life as a quadriplegic ==
Ever since his article emerged in public, hundreds of children dropped in at his Pune home to talk to MP, and thousands more were inspired by him. From his wheelchair, MP counselled many into new careers, to find fresh meaning in life, and to embrace challenges with human spirit. MP didn't need any academic examples to illustrate his arguments.

In Born to Fly, MP's biography by his course-mate Air Commodore Nitin Sathe, released on 25 October, the author reflects on contemporary public discourse in India, including attitudes toward nationalism, the military, and patriotism. The book presents the author's perspective on these issues and their impact on society.

== Illness and death ==
Anil Kumar died on 20 May 2014, two weeks after he turned 50. He had blood cancer; he was diagnosed only shortly before his 50th birthday. His mortal remains were cremated at Bopodi Gas Shavadahini in Pune.

== Biography ==
A biography of MP Anil Kumar, titled Born to Fly, was published (ISBN 938271166X) on 25 October 2016. It was written by Air Commodore Nitin Sathe. Socrates K. Valath, noted Malayalam writer and filmmaker has made a documentary on the life of Anil Kumar, titled, And the Fight Goes On.
