= V. Unnikrishnan Nair =

Indian writer

- Born: 9 January 1893; Pallikunnu, Kannur district, Kerala, India
- Died: 19 May 1985 (aged 92); Kerala
- Education: Government Brennen College, Thalassery; Madras Christian College
- Occupations: Essayist; poet; translator; biographer
- Spouse: Gauri Amma
- Parents: Rama Kurup (father); Madhavi Amma (mother)
- Awards: 1952 Government of Madras Award; 1977 Puthelan Award; 1981 Kerala Sahitya Akademi Fellowship

Vasupurath Unnikrishnan Nair (9 January 1893 – 19 May 1985) was an Indian writer of Malayalam literature, best known as a contemporary and associate of Vallathol Narayana Menon. He was the author of a number of books which include Tagorinte Nadakangal, the translation of three plays written by Rabindranath Tagore into Malayalam. Nair honoured by the Kerala Sahitya Akademi with the distinguished fellowship in 1981.

== Biography ==
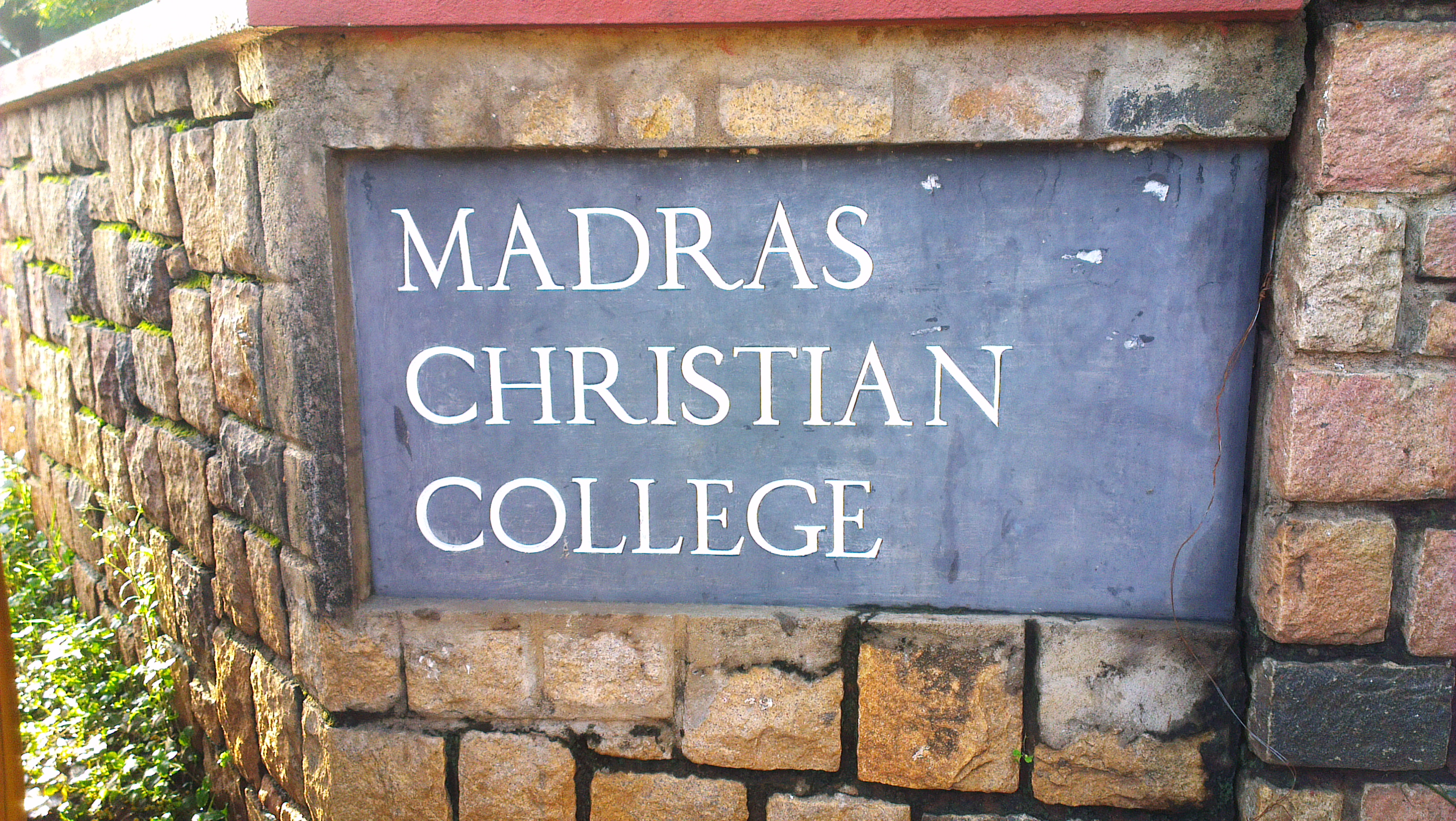
Madras Christian College

V. Unnikrishnan Nair was born on 9 January 1893 at Pallikkunnu, a small village in the present-day Kannur district of the south Indian state of Kerala to Sankaranveettil Rama Kurup and Madhavi Amma. After early schooling at Tirur Lower Primary School, he completed high school education at two schools in Ottapalam and Kannur and joined the Government Brennen College, Thalassery from where he completed the pre-university course. Subsequently, he graduated with honours from Madras Christian College and returned to Brennen College as a faculty. However, his stay there lasted only two months as he was appointed at the Central Revenue Department in Chennai in 1920. He held various posts to reach the position of the deputy director of inspection and when the commercial taxation department was established in Odisha, he was selected to head the department. He superannuated from service in 1950.

Nair, who was married to Gauri Amma, died on 19 May 1985, at the age of 92, at Kozhikode.

== Legacy and honours ==
Unnikrishnan Nair published over ten books, including two biographies of Vallathol Narayana Menon and Mahakavi Kuttamath. It was he who translated three plays of Rabindranath Tagore viz. Visarjan, Chira Kumar Sabha and Dakghar into Malayalam which were compiled as the first volume of the series, Tagorinte Natakangal. Besides, he translated three more Bengali works, Vinodini of Tagore and Rajani and Kapalakundala of Bankim Chandra Chatterjee. He presided over the Kerala Kala Parishad during 1954–56 and sat in the executive councils of the Sahitya Akademi, Kerala Sahitya Akademi and Kerala Sahitya Parishad.

The Government of Madras honoured Nair with their annual award in 1952 and he received the Puthelan Award in 1977. In 1989, he was inducted as a distinguished fellow by the Kerala Sahitya Akademi.

== Bibliography ==
=== Biographies ===
- Unnikrishnan Nair. V (1962). Vallathol. Mathrubhumi: Mathrubhumi.
- Unnikrishnan Nair, V. (1969). Mahakavi Kuttamathu. Calicut: Mathrubhumi.

=== Other works ===
- Unnikrishnan nair. V (1964). Kalidasahredayam. Mathrubhumi: Mathrubhumi.
- Unnikrishnan Nair. V (1952). Rajayogini. Mangalodayam: Mangalodayam.
- Unnikrishnan nair. V (1951). Kaladippadukal. Mangalodayam: Mangalodayam.
- Unnikrishnan Nair. V (1952). Urvvasi. Mangalodayam: Mangalodayam.
- Unnikrishnan Nair. V (1954). Ravirasmikal. Kamalalaya: Kamalalaya.
- Unnikrishnan Nair. V (1098). Kathamalika. B. V. Book depot, Trichur: B. V. Book depot.
- Unnikrishnan Nair. V (1972). Sathyavathy.
- Unnikrishnan Nair. V (1964). Kalidasa Hridayam.

=== Translations ===
- Unnikrishnan Nair. V (1967). Tagorinde Nadakangal. S P C S: S P C S.
- Unnikrishnan Nair. V (1988). Vinodini. Kozhikode mathrubhumi: Kozhikode mathrubhumi.
- Unnikrishnan Nair, V.; Unnikrishnan Nair, V. (1968). Ravikiranangal: Tagore kavithakal. Kottayam: S.P.C.S.
- Bankim Chandra Chatterjee (1989). Kapaalakundala. Translated by Unnikrishnan Nair, V. Kozhikode, Mathrubhumi Books.

== See also ==
- List of Malayalam-language authors by category
- List of Malayalam-language authors
