= Rajasekhar =

Rajasekhar may refer to:

- Rajasekhar (actor), stage name of Indian actor Rajasekhar Varadharajan (born 1962)
- Rajasekhar (director), Indian film director and screenwriter Subramanian (died 1991)

== See also ==
- Rajashekhara (Sanskrit poet), 10th-century Sanskrit poet, dramatist and critic from India
- S. Rajasekar, Indian cinematographer, screenwriter, film director and actor, one half of the Robert–Rajasekar duo
- S. Rajasekharan (born 1946), literary critic and poet
