= C. R. Neelakandan =

Indian writer, politician and activist

- Born: 1957 (age 68–69); Karuvannoor, Thrissur district, Kerala, India
- Occupations: Environmental activist, writer
- Spouse: V. M. Girija
- Children: 2
- Awards: 2009 Mukundan C. Menon award; 2013 Gandhi Darshan Award

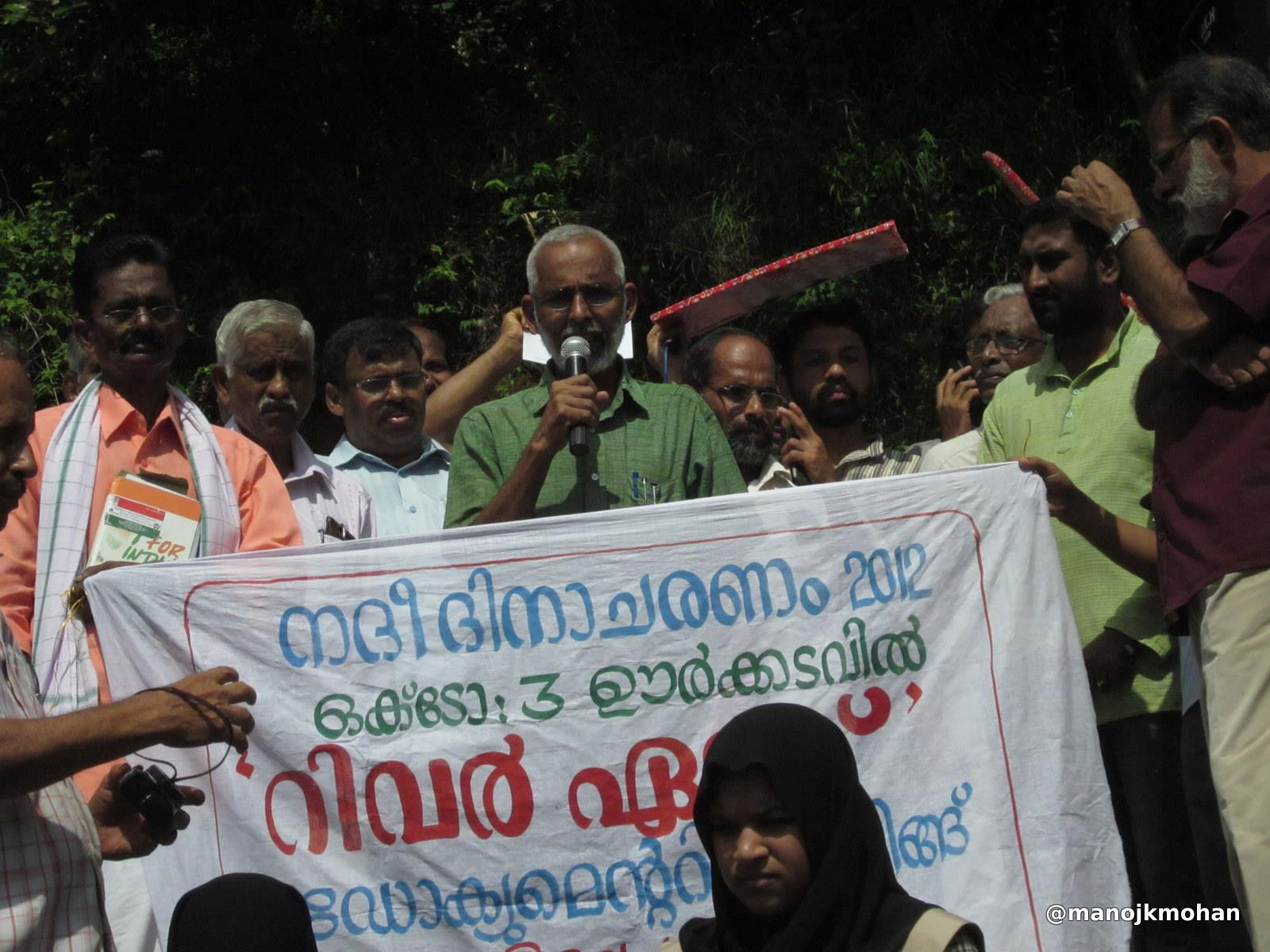
C. R. Neelakandan at an environmental event held on October 3, 2012 on the Chaliyar River.

C. R. Neelakandan is an Indian environmental activist, politician and writer. A regular contributor to Malayalam periodicals on environmental issues, Neelakandan is a former State Convener of Aam Aadmi Party Kerala.

== Early life ==
Neelakandan was born to C. P. Raman Namboothiri and Savithri Antharjanam in 1957 at Karuvannoor in Thrissur District, in the south Indian state of Kerala. He completed his education from Christ College, Irinjalakuda and Government Engineering College, Thrissur. He was an activist of SFI at district and state levels while studying. After his academic study, he underwent training at the Bhabha Atomic Research Centre Bombay. Subsequently, he joined Keltron in 1981 and was the Deputy General Manager of Keltron at its Aroor branch at the time of his superannuation in May 2015.

== Career ==
Neelakandan began his political activism in students movement. He was arrested during The Emergency and was held in illegal custody for alleged possession of communist literature. Later he joined Students Federation of India, and also worked in the Communist Party. In 2014, he joined the Aam Admi Party and became a member of the State Executive Committee and, later, its State Convener. However, he parted ways with the party in 2019. In 2016, he supported Amnesty International in the controversy against ABVP.

He actively participates in environmental issues such as public protest against waste dumping at various places across the state such as Lalur, Vilappilashala, Panamkuttichira, Brahmapuram, Pettippalam etc. Struggles like Silent Valley, National Highway Protection Samithy, Chengara, Plachimada, GAIUL Pipe Line, High Speed Rail Corridor, Many mining projects like Mineral sand mining on Arattupuzha Coast, Moolampilly displacement, Malabar Gold pollution, Periyar River Protection, Endosulfan in Kazaragod, Aranmula Airport, Athirappilly and Pooyamkutty HEPs and many others.

== Personal life ==
Neelakandan is married to V. M. Girija, a poet and staff of the All India Radio, Kochi. The couple has two daughters, Aardra and Aarcha and the family lives in Kakkanadu, in Kochi.

== Books ==
- Paristhithiyum Aagolavalkaranavum (Environment and Globalisation)
- Prakrthiyude Nilavilikal
- C.R. Neelakandan (2009). Lavalin Rekhakaliloode. Olive Books. Archived from the original on 29 October 2020.
- C.R. Neelakandan (2014). Aam Aadmi: Sadhaaranakkarude Party. Current Books.
- Paristhithiyude Varthamanangal
- C.R. Neelakandan (2015). Haritha Varthamaanangal. Saikatham Books. ISBN 978-9382757801. Archived from the original on 29 October 2020.

== Awards ==
- Baba Award
- Mukundan C. Menon award (2009)
- A. Sujanapal Award
- First Oorja Kerala Award
- Evoorath Award
- Gandhi Darshan Award (2013)
