= Chithra =

Chithra may refer to:

- K. S. Chithra singer
- Chithra Madhavan Indian historian
- Chithrabhumi magazine

== See also ==
- Chitra (disambiguation)
