= Shebaly =

Malayalam writer (1955–2023)

Shebaly (19 September 1955 – January 2023) was the pen name of a Malayalam writer. He was a priest of Malankara Orthodox Syrian Church. He resided in the United States. His real name is Babu Varghese.

Under this pen name Shebaly he had written short stories and poems in mainstream media like Manorama Sunday, Kala Kaumudi, and Katha since 1972. He was the editor of Poomchola—a children's monthly.

== Published works ==
- Ponni Malayude Thazhvarangalil (novel)
- Swapnath Paneh (novel)
- Manasoru Sakshi (collection of dramas broadcast on radio)
