= Jisa Jose =

Indian writer of Malayalam literature

- Born: Kottayam
- Occupations: writer, teacher
- Children: 2
- Writing career
- Language: Malayalam
- Period: 21st century
- Notable works: Mudrita, Anandabharam, Mukthibahini, Pushpaka Vimanam, Dark fantasy, Sarvamanushyarudeyum Rakshakku vendiyulla Kripa

Jisa Jose is an Indian writer in Malayalam from Kerala. She works as the vice principal and head of the Malayalam department at Government Brennen College, Thalassery. Jisa also writes stories and articles in various periodicals.

== Biography ==
Jisa was born in Kottayam district, Kerala. Her major works include Mudrita, Dark Fantasy, Sarva Manushyarudeyum Rakshakk Vendiyulla Kripa (Grace for the Salvation of All Humans), and Irupatham Nilayil Oru Puzha (A River on the Twentieth Floor). Jisa has been appreciated for breaking heterosexual norms in writing. A common feature of Jisa's writing is the many facets of women's lives. Malayala Manorama described her as a writer who travels through the minds of women.

== Bibliography ==
_{Source(s):}

- Swantham Idangal
- Puthunovel Vayanagal
- Navamadhyama Chinthagal
- Pranayathinte Pusthagam
- Mudrita
- Dark Fantasy
- Sarva Manushyarudeyum Rakshakk Vendiyulla Kripa
- Aananthabharam
- Irupatham Nilayil Oru Puzha
- Kripa
- Mukhtibhahini
