= Sreekumari Ramachandran =

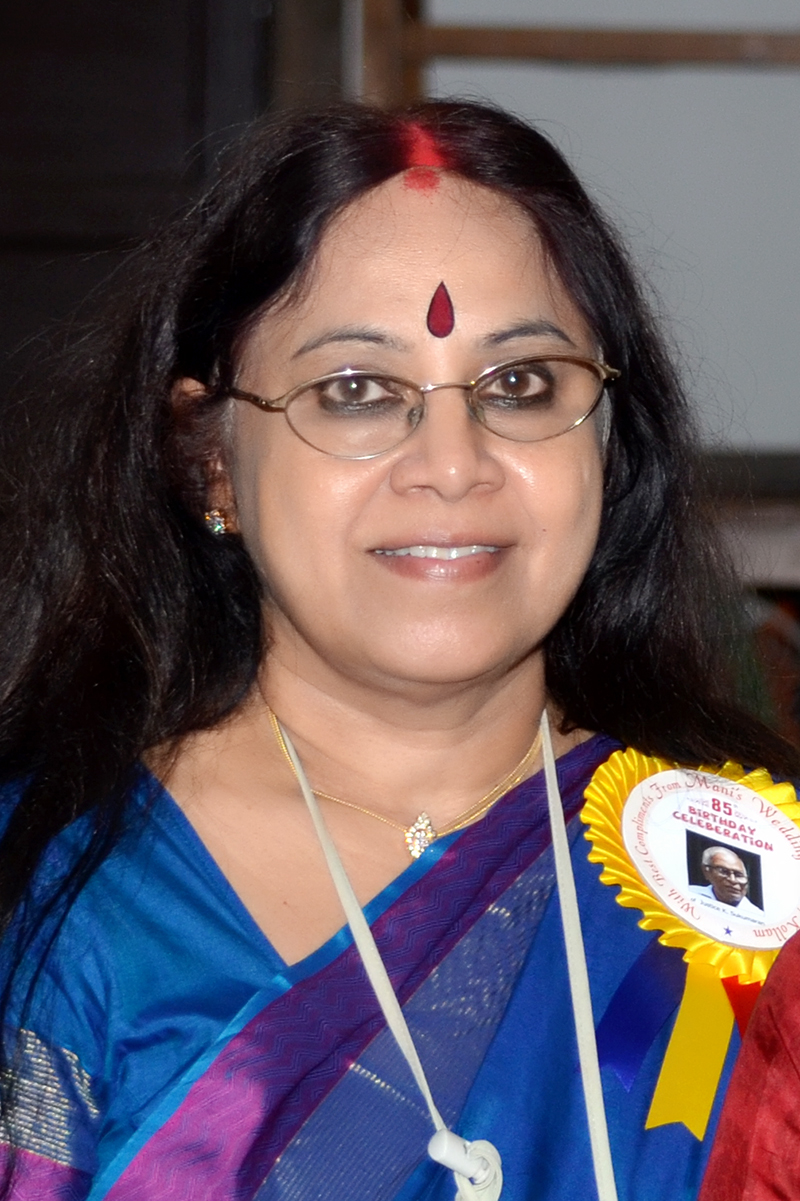
- Born: P. Sreekumari; 1950 (age 75–76); Cochin, Kerala
- Citizenship: Indian
- Education: Dakshina Bharat Hindi Prachar Sabha
- Alma mater: University of Kerala
- Occupations: writer, dancer
- Years active: 1988 – present
- Known for: Malayalam Literature – Writer
- Spouse: C. Ramachandra Menon
- Children: Reghu, Mohan
- Parent(s): V.K. Prabhakara Menon (father); Seetha Devi (mother)

Sreekumari Ramachandran is a Malayalam–language novelist, short story writer, orator, columnist, dancer and singer from Kerala, India.

== Biography ==
Sreekumari was born and grew up in Cochin.

She married Ramachandra Menon. She started writing in 1988. On 1992 she got auditioned by the All India Radio and was subsequently elevated to B High grade in music. Since then she has presented Sugam Sangeet and Bhakthi Sangeeth on A.I.R Trichur and Doordarshan Trivandrum. She is the Founder President of Indian Society of Authors (Kerala Chapter).

== Works ==
=== Short stories ===
- Nirmalyam – N B S Publications – 1993
- Parithraanam – D. C. Books −1995
- Thaiveru – Geethanjali Publications −1997
- Nakshatrangalkku Niramundo – Pen Books – 1999
- Vidhavakalude Graamam – Pen Books – 1999
- Pala Veshangalil Chila Manushyar – Pen Books – 2001
- Silence of the Grove – Millennium Books Delhi – 2003
- Muhajeer – Poorna Publications – 2005
- Pulachinthu – Poorna Publications – 2008
- Call girl – N B S Publications – 2011

=== Novels ===
- Kaalame Maappu Tharu – Geethanjali Publications – 1997
- Beyond The Final Episode – Harman Publishers Delhi – 2002
- Jalasamaadhi – Poorna Publications – 2004
- Agniveena – Current Books – 2005
- Dayaharji – Poorna Publications – 2010

=== History and Legends ===
- Tales of Malabar – Prism Books, Bangalore – 2020

=== Music ===
- Sapthaswarangal
- Karnaataka Sangeetha Lokam – Mathrubhumi Books – 2007

=== Biography ===
- Meera – Mathrubhumi Books – 2006
- Amaavaasiyile Nakshatrangal – Poorna Publications −2007
- Sakthan Thampuran - Poorna Publications
- Bharathathile Rishikavikal (Biography of 150 Saint Poets of India, in Malayalam) - Mathrubhoomi Publications - 2019

=== Translation ===
From English To Malayalam

- Pride & Prejudice - Translation of "Pride & Prejudice" by Jane Austen - Mathrubhoomi Publications -
- Kerala Samskaaram Oru Thiranottam - Translation of "Glimpses of Kerala Culture" by Princess Aswathy Thirunal Gauri Lakshmibayi – Mathrubhoomi Publications - 2012
- Paliam Charithram - Translation of Paliam History by Prof. Radha Devi – Paliam Trust – 2013
- Choothu - Translation of "AJAYA" by Anand Neelakantan - Mathrubhoomi Publications - 2017
- Kali - Translation of "Kali" by Anand Neelakantan - Mathrubhoomi Publications - 2017
- Shareeram Udaattamaaya Orupakaranam - Translation of "Body - The Greatest Gadget " By Sadguru Jaggi Vasudev - Mathrubhoomi Publications - 2016

From Malayalam To English

- Ever with love P.K.Warrier - Translation of "Sasneham P.K Warrier" by Dr. Muralidharan – Kottakkal Aryavaidyasala – 2012
- Aithihyamaala – Translation of the legendary work "Aithihyamala" by Kottarathil Shankkunni – Mathrubhoomi Publications - 2010
- Vishnu Sahasra Naamam commentary - Translation of "Vishnu Sahasra Naamam Vyakhyanam by Acharya A.K.B.NAIR- Bharathiya Vidya Bhavan Publication - 2016
- Himalayan Odyssey -Translation of “Hymavathabhoovil” by Sri.M.P Veerendrakumar, M.P.) - Penguin Random House - 2019

=== Children's Tales ===
- Then Kinnom
- Aithyhyamaalaa abridged version (English)
