= Socrates K. Valath =

Indian writer

- Born: 1963 (age 62–63); Cheranellore, Ernakulam, Kerala, India
- Occupations: Novelist, short story writer
- Writing career
- Genre: Fiction
- Notable awards: Padmarajan Award

Socrates Krishnan Valath, (born 1963) is an Indian novelist and short story writer, working in Malayalam literature. His short story anthology, Nyayavithi, was selected for the Padmarajan Award in 2014. He is also a recipient of the Kerala State Television Award in 2003, C. Ayyappan Award in 2015 and a Certificate of Merit at the Annual Akashvani Awards in 2017.

== Biography ==
Socrates Valath was born in 1963 to the writer V. V. K. Valath as the youngest of three sons, in Ernakulam . (Note: Mopasang Valath, a noted painter and Einstein Valath, a writer, are his siblings) His entry into Malayalam literature was with a short story, Vala, published in Mathrubhumi weekly in 1987. It preceded a number of books which include his novel, Aanandalahari, and six short story anthologies. He has also published a book of interviews, Kathaantharangal, which features a number of interviews he had with his fellow writers including S. Hareesh, Thomas Joseph, Unni R., Santhosh Echikkanam and E. Santhosh Kumar and V. J. James.

Valalth's entry into films was in 2003, when he directed Harappa to Pokhran, a children's film which was aired in Surya TV. Subsequently, he wrote the screenplay and dialogues for two films, Thavalam in 2008 and KQ in 2013. He has also directed a documentary, And the Fight Goes On, on the quadriplegic writer and historian, MP Anil Kumar. Besides, he has compiled stories for Crime File for Surya TV and Jeevan TV, created content for the programmes, Vipani for Doordarshan, Business Watch for Asianet, and Haritha Keralam for Jeevan TV and scripted the tele-serials, Adaminte Santhathikal for Asianet and Ente Kuttikalude Achan for Mazhavil Manorama.

Valath lives in North Paravur, in Ernakulam district.

== Awards and honours ==
Harappa to Pokhran, a Saljith P. R. production directed by Valath, was selected for the award for the best children's programme at the 2003 Kerala State Television Awards. A decade later, his short story anthology, Nyaayavithi, fetched him the Padmarajan Award in 2014. He received the C. Ayyappan Award for short story in 2015 and Janala (The Window), a radioplay he wrote for the Thrissur station of the All India Radio, was selected for the Certificate of Merit at the Akashvani annual competition in 2017.

== Selected bibliography ==
=== Short story anthology ===
- Socrates K. Valath (2018). Veronica @ 15. Pattambi: Logos Books. ISBN 9789386744784.
- Socrates K. Valath (2019). Tag Number 3. Pattambi: Logos Books. ISBN 9789388364409.
- Socrates K. Valath (2010). Madanelloorile penpannikal. Kottayam: Sahithyapravarthaka Sahakaranasangham. ISBN 9780000170446.
- Socrates K. Valath (2014). Kavachitham. Kozhikode: Mathrubhumi Books. ISBN 9788182662339.
- Socrates K. Valath (2017). Jaya He. Pattambi: Logos Books. ISBN 9788193332368.
- Socrates K. Valath (2014). AD 2025. Saikatham Books.
- Socrates K. Valath. Nyaayavithi. Kottayam: DC Books. ISBN 9789386680556.
- Socrates K. Valath. Theranjedutha Kathakal. Pattambi: Logos Books Pattambi.
- Socrates K. Valath. Appooppan Konna Maram. Thrissur: Green Books. ISBN 9789393596536.
- Socrates K. Valath (2022). Katha. Kottayam: Sahitya Pravarthaka Cooperative Society. ISBN 9789394705173.

=== Novel ===
- Socrates K. Valath (2016). Aanandalahari. Thrissur: Green Books. ISBN 9788184235098. third edition 2022

=== Interviews ===
- Socrates K. Valath (2015). Kathantharangal. Bookerman. p. 152. ISBN 9788192883137.

== See also ==
- List of Malayalam-language authors by category
- List of Malayalam-language authors
