= V. V. K. Valath =

Malayalam writer and historian

Vadakke Valath Krishnan
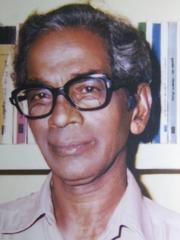
- Born: 25 December 1918; Valam, Cheranallur, Ernakulam, Kerala, India
- Died: 31 December 2000 (aged 82); North Paravur, Ernakulam
- Occupations: Historian, writer, poet, toponymist
- Parent(s): Velu Ashan (Father), Paru (Mother)
- Writing career
- Pen name: V. V. K. Valath
- Genres: Novel, poem, toponymy
- Subjects: Social aspects, history
- Notable works: Rigvedathilude; Keralathile Stalacharitrangal; Idimuzhakkam; Minnal Velicham
- Notable awards: Kerala Sahitya Akademi Award for Overall Contributions; Pandit Karuppan Award; Place Names Society Fellowship
- Website: vvkvalath.com

Vadakke Valath Krishnan (25 December 1918 – 31 December 2000), commonly known as V. V. K. Valath, was an Indian writer, poet, toponymist and historian of Malayalam language. One of the pioneers of toponymy in Kerala, he focused on the origin of place names in the state as the subject of his works which are known for their attention to historic detail. He wrote poems, short-stories, novels, and over 400 historical articles and his most notable works are Rigvedathilude (a study of Rigveda), Keralathile Stalacharitrangal (History of Places in Kerala), and poetry anthologies, Idimuzhakkam (The Thunder Rumble) and Minnal Velicham (The Thunder Flash). Kerala Sahitya Akademi awarded him their annual award for overall contributions in 1999. He was also a fellow of the Place Names Society and a recipient of the Pandit Karuppan Award.

== Biography ==
V. V. K. Valath was born on the Christmas Day of 1918 at Valam, a small hamlet between South Chittoor and Cheranellore, near Edapally in Ernakulam district of the south Indian state of Kerala to Vadakke Valath Velu Asan and Paru. After early schooling at Little Flower Upper Primary School, Cheranellore, he passed the tenth standard examination from St. Albert's High School, Ernakulam before completing the teachers' training course. His career started as a civilian clerk in Indian Army, stationed in Whitefield, Bangalore and on his return to Kerala, he taught at his alma mater, Little Flower Upper Primary School, for a short period, before joining Al Farookiya High School, Cheranellore where he spent the rest of his teaching career spanning 27 years until his superannuation from service.

Valath was married to Krishodhari and the couple had three sons, Mopasang Valath, a painter, Einstein Valath, a writer and Socrates K. Valath, a writer as well as a screenwriter. He died on the last day of 2000, at his rented house in North Paravur, at the age of 82.

== Legacy and honours ==
Though not involved in active politics, Valath was attracted to communist ideals and his works focused mainly on the effects of capitalism and poverty. He published a poem on Mahatma Gandhi, titled The Light of the 20th Century in Mathrubhumi Azhchappathippu while serving as a civilian clerk in British Military at Bangalore for which he was dismissed from British service. Later, going against the normal practice followed in the 1940s, he pioneered free verse in Malayalam poetry, by writing poems without following poetic rules, metre, or rhythms. Idimuzhakkam, MinnalVelicham, Chakravalathinapuram, Randu Mazha Veenalo and Aarkkariyanam were written in free verse. In late 1960s, he shifted his attention to Kerala history and its links to Sangam literature and published his first book on Kerala history, Keralathile Stalacharitrangal, in 1969. Later, he furthered his research with assistance from Kerala Sahitya Akademi, and published four books on toponymy viz. Keralathile Stalacharitrangal: Thrissur, Keralathile Stalacharitrangal: Ernakulam, Keralathile Stalacharitrangal: Palakkad and Keralathile Stalacharitrangal: Trivandrum. His work, Rigvedathilude, is an attempt to relate the Rigveda to the history of the land and the book detailed the customs and culture of vedic age India.

Valath, who wrote Lumumbaye Taracha Kurish (The Cross on which Patrice Lumumba was Crucified), Avar Nammude Rosenberg Dambadikale Konnu Kalanju (They killed our Rosenberg couples), based on global themes, was honoured for his overall contributions by the Kerala Sahitya Akademi in 1999. He was also a fellow of the Place Names Society of India and a recipient of the Pandit Karuppan Award. A road in Cheranellore has been named after him as V. V. K. Valath Road.

== Selected bibliography ==
=== Poems ===
- Valath, V. V. K. (1984). Idumuzhakkam. Kottayam: National Book Stall.
- Valath, V. V. K. (1947). Minnal Velicham. Thrissur: Mangalodayam.
- Valath, V. V. K. (1974). Njan Iniyum Varum. Kottayam: National Book Stall.
- Valath, V. V. K. Chakravalathinappuram.
- Valath, V. V. K. (2002). V V K Valathinte kavithakal. Kottayam: Current books. ISBN 9788124012154.
- Valath, V. V. K. Bhavasramkhala. Kozhikode: P. K. Brothers.
- Valath, V. V. K. Vallaki.

=== Short stories ===
- Valath, V. V. K. (1955). Ini Vandi Illa.
- Ayakkanja Kathu (The Mail that was Never Sent)

=== Novel ===
- Ivide Oru Kamukan Marikunnu (Here Dies a Lover)

=== Biography ===
- Valath, V. V. K. (1985). Pandit Karuppan. Kerala History Association.

=== Scholarly works ===
- Valath, V. V. K. (1969). Rigvedathiloode. Kottayam: N.B.S.
- Valath, V. V. K. (1977). Charithra kavadangal. Kottayam: Sahitya Pravarthaka Sahakarana Sangam.
- Valath, V. V. K. (1978). Sabaimala, Sholayar, Moonar. Kottayam: Sahitya Pravarthaka Sahakarana Sangam.
- Valath, V. V. K. (1969). Keralathile sthala charithrangal. Kottayam: National Book Stall.
- Valath, V. V. K. (2003). Keralathile sthalacharithrangal: Thrissur Jilla. Thrissur: Kerala Sahitya Academy. ISBN 9788176900515.
- Valath, V. V. K. (2005). Keralathile sthalacharithrangal: Palakkad Jilla. Thrissur: Kerala Sahitya Academy. ISBN 9788176900737.
- Valath, V. V. K. (2006). Keralathile sthalacharithrangal: Ernakulam Jilla. Thrissur: Kerala Sahitya Academy. ISBN 9788176901055.
- Valath, V. V. K. (1998). Keralathile sthalacharithrangal: Thiruvananthapuram jilla. Thrissur: Kerala Sahitya Academy.

== See also ==
- List of Malayalam-language authors by category
- List of Malayalam-language authors
