= Anoop Sasikumar =

Indian economist

- Born: 23 February 1984 (age 42); Kottayam, Kerala, India
- Education: Rajiv Gandhi Institute of Technology; Mahatma Gandhi University; Hyderabad Central University
- Occupations: Economist; Novelist
- Years active: Since 2006

Anoop Sasikumar is an Indian economist and a novelist of Malayalam literature.

== Biography ==
He was born on 23 February 1984. He graduated in mechanical engineering from Rajiv Gandhi Institute of Technology, Kottayam of Mahatma Gandhi University. He started his career as an engineer at Shapoorji Pallonji Group in 2006.

His first novel, Ettamathe Velipadu (The Eighth Revelation), shortlisted for the 2018 DC Books Literary Award, was published in 2019. His second novel, Gotham, was published by Logos Books in 2020.

Sasikumar lives in Kottayam, Kerala.

== See also ==
- Malayalam literature
- List of Malayalam-language authors
