= R. Ramachandran (poet) =

Indian poet (born 1923)

- Born: 1923; Thamarathiruthi, Trichur, Kingdom of Cochin
- Died: 3 August 2005 (aged 81–82); Kozhikode, Kerala, India
- Occupations: Poet, professor
- Writing career
- Language: Malayalam
- Notable awards: Sahitya Akademi Award, Kerala Sahitya Akademi Award

R. Ramachandran (1923–2005) was a Malayalam–language poet from Kerala state, South India.

== Biography ==
Born in 1923 in Thamarathiruthi village in Thrissur district of Kerala, Ramachandran studied in various schools of the erstwhile Kingdom of Cochin and obtained his graduation and masters in literature from Maharajas College, Ernakulam. He taught Malayalam in Malabar Christian College, Kozhikode from 1948 until his retirement in 1978. He was a scholar in Sanskrit, English and Malayalam languages. Though not a prolific poet, Ramachandran had an impact in Malayalam poetry with his works such as Murali, Sandhya Nikunjangal, Shyama Sundari and Pinne. An anthology of his poems titled R. Ramachandrante Kavithakal received the Sahitya Akademi Award in 2000 and the Kerala Sahitya Akademi Award in 2003.
