= Satyan Madakkara =

Malayalam poet

Sathyan Madakkara (or Satyan M.) is a poet in Malayalam literature.

== Biography ==
His published collection of poems are Manal (sand), Kappalillatha turamukham (port without ship) and Oru malsyavum jalashayam nirmikkunnilla (No fish makes any lake). - published by DC Books.
