= P. Vatsala =

Malayalam novelist (1939–2023)

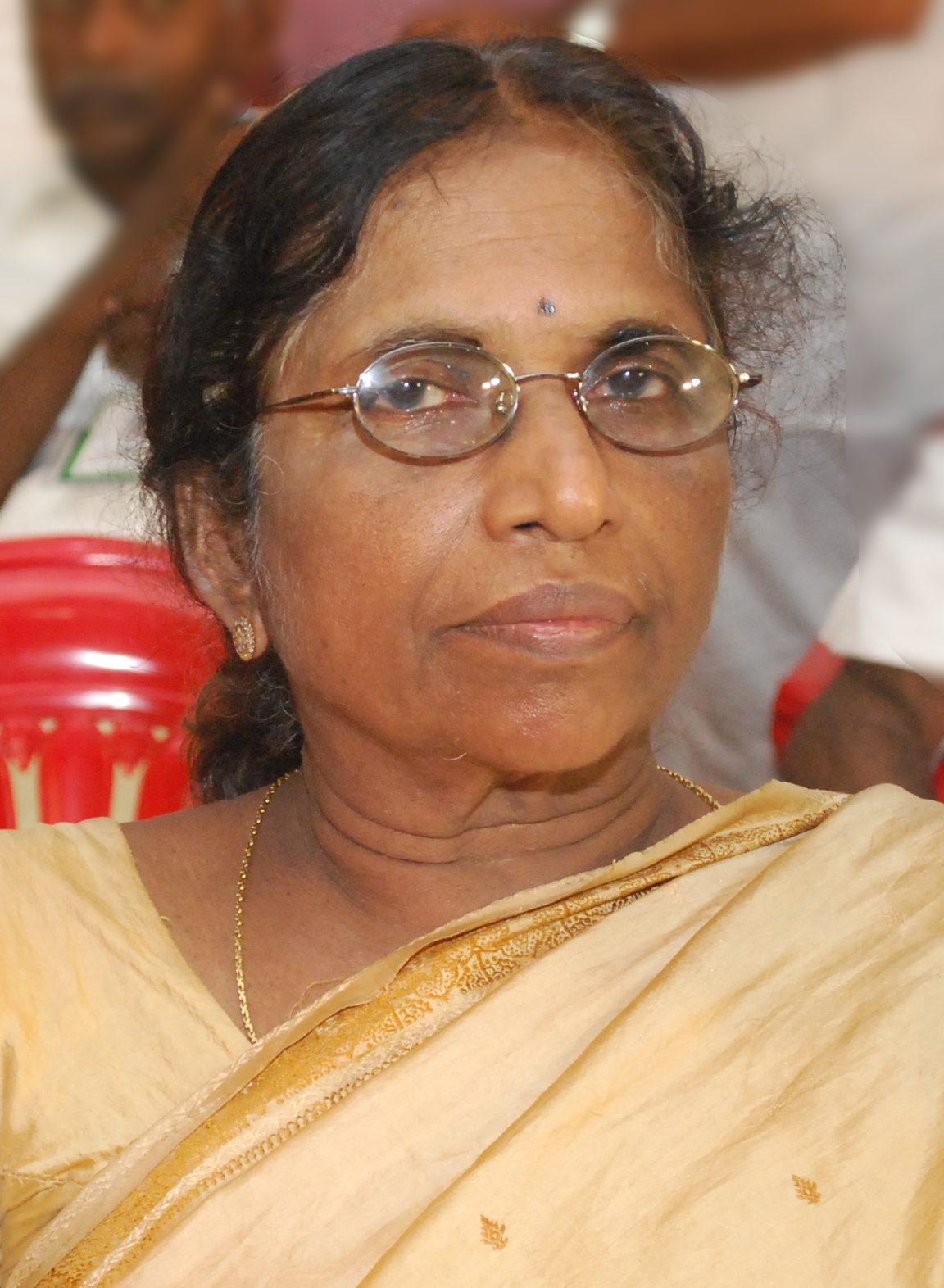
- Born: Parakkulathil Vatsala; 28 August 1939; Calicut, Malabar District, Madras Province, British India (present-day Kozhikode, Kerala, India)
- Died: 21 November 2023 (aged 84); Kozhikode, Kerala, India
- Occupations: Writer; Teacher
- Writing career
- Subjects: Novel, short story
- Website: www.vatsalap.com

Parakkulathil Vatsala (28 August 1939 – 21 November 2023) was an Indian Malayalam novelist, short story writer, and social activist from Kerala. She is a recipient of Ezhuthachan Puraskaram 2021, the highest literary honour by the government of Kerala. She is only the fifth woman to receive the award since its institution in 1993.

Vatsala was also a recipient of Kerala Sahitya Akademi Award for her novel Nizhalurangunna Vazhikal (The Paths where Shadows Sleep). She has written over 25 short story collections and 17 novels. She is renowned for her distinct style of writing.

Her works have won several awards including Kumkumam Award (for Nellu published in 1972), the Kerala Sahitya Akademi Award (for Nizhalurangunna Vazhikal), the Muttathu Varkey Award, and the C. V. Kunhiraman Memorial Sahitya Award.

A former headmistress, Vatsala also held the post of Chairperson of Kerala Sahitya Akademi. She was associated with PuKaSa, a left-leaning cultural movement, but lately she had been supportive of Hindu right-wing organisations.

Vatsala resided in Kozhikode district, in northern Kerala. She died from heart failure on 21 November 2023, at the age of 85.

== Selected works ==
Short stories

- Pempi, Poorna Books, Calicut, 1969
- Pazhaya, Puthiya Nagaram (The Old, New City), The Sahithya Pravarthaka Cooperative Society (SPCS), Kottayam, 1979
- Anupamayude Kavalkkaran (The Bodyguard of Anupama), SPCS, 1980
- Aanavettakkaran (The Elephant Hunter), SPCS, 1982
- Unikkoran Chathopathiya (Unikkoran Chathopathiya), SPCS, 1985
- Annamaria Neridan (For Anna Marie To Confront), SPCS, 1988
- Karuttha Mazha Peyyunna Thazhvara (The Valley of Black Rains), SPCS, 1988
- Chamundy Kuzhi (Chamundi's Pit), SPCS, 1989
- Arundhati Karayunnilla (Arundhati doesn't Cry), SPCS, 1991
- Koonychoottile Velicham (The Light behind the Flight Stairs), Prabhath Book House, Trivandrum, 1992
- Madakkam II (The Return II), D. C. Books, 1998
- Panguru Pushpathinde Theen (Honey from the Flower of Panguru), Poorna Books, 1998
- Madakkam (The Return), D. C. Books, Kottayam, 1998
- Kaly ’98 Thudarcha (Sports 98 Cont.), Prabhath Book House, 1998
- Pookku Vayil Ponvayil (The Sunset that is Gold), Olive, 1999
- Dhushyanthannum Bheemannummillatha Lokam (The world Devoid by Dhushyntha and Bhima), Poorna Books, 1999
- Kalal Kavalal (The Soldier who is the Guard), D. C. Books, 2001
- Kottayile Prema (Prema in the forth), Olive Books, Calicut, 2002
- Pooram (The Temple Festival), D. C. Books, 2003
- Aaranniya Kandam (Stories of the Forest), D. C. Books, 2003
- Mythiliyuda Makal (The Daughter of Mythili), Green Books, Calicut, 2004
- Ashokanum Ayalum (He and Ashokan), D. C. Books, 2006
- Chandalabhikshukiyum Marikkunna Pownamiyum (Chandalabhikshuki and the Dying full Moon), Book Point, Calicut, 2007
- Suvarna Kadhakal (The Golden Stories), Green Books, Trichur, 2008
- Gate Thurannittirikkunnu, SPCS, Kottayam, 2008

Novels

- Thakarcha (Decadence), Poorna Books, Calicut, 1969
- Nellu (Paddy), The Sahithya Pravarthaka Cooperative Society (SPCS), Kottayam, 1972 (Adapted into a film with same name in 1974)
- Agnayam (Of Fire), SPCS 1974; translated into English by Vasanthi Sankaranarayanan as Agneyam: The story of a Nambudiri woman, Sahitya Akademi, 2008
- Nizhaluragunna Vazhikal (The Paths where Shadows Sleep), SPCS 1975
- Arakkillam (The House of Wax), SPCS, 1977
- Venal (The Summer), SPCS, 1979
- Kanal (The Live Coal), SPCS, 1979
- Nambarukal (The Numbers), SPCS, 1980
- Palayam (The Barracks), SPCS, 1981
- Kooman Kolly (The Valley Owls), SPCS 1981
- Gauthaman (Gauthaman), SPCS, 1986
- Aarum marikuunnilla (Nobody Dies), SPCS / D. C. Books, 1987
- Chaver (The Knights), SPCS, 1991
- Rose merreyude Aakasangal (The Skies of Rosemarry), D. C. Books, Kottayam, 1993
- Vilaapam (The Cry), D. C. Books, 1997
- Aadhijalam (The Primeval Water), D. C. Books, 2004
- Melppalam (The Flyover), Mathrubhumi Books, Calicut, 2007

== Awards ==
- Kumkumam Award - Nellu
- Kerala Sahitya Akademi Award - Nizhalurangunna Vazhikal
- Muttathu Varkey Award - for her contributions to Malayalam literature
- C. V. Kunhiraman Memorial Sahithya Award
- Kerala Sahitya Akademi Fellowship (2019)
