= Chithiram Pesuthadi (disambiguation) =

Chithiram Pesuthadi (transl. The picture speaks) is a 2006 Indian Tamil-language film.

Chithiram Pesuthadi may also refer to:

- Chithiram Pesuthadi 2, a 2019 film unrelated to the 2006 film
- Chithiram Pesuthadi (2013 TV series), an Indian soap opera on Jaya TV
- Chithiram Pesuthadi (2021 TV series), an Indian soap opera on Zee Tamil

== See also ==
- A picture is worth a thousand words, the idiom
