= Maharaja's College, Ernakulam =

Degree College in Kochi, Kerala, India

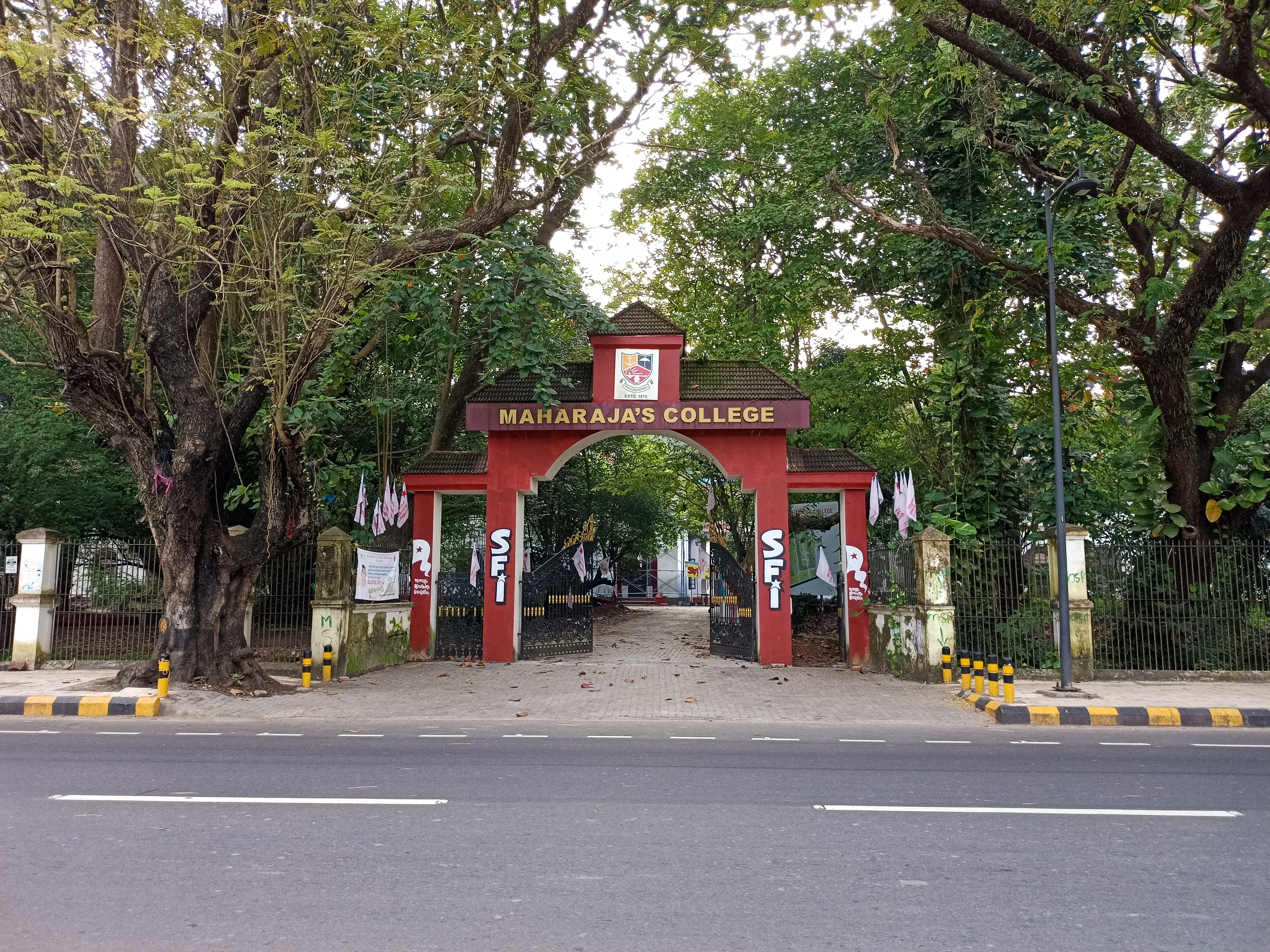
- Maharaja's college main gate in 2023
- Former names: His Highness The Maharaja's College, kochi
- Type: Government
- Established: 1875; 151 years ago
- Accreditation: NAAC
- Academic affiliations: Mahatma Gandhi University, UGC
- Principal: V. S. Joy
- Undergraduates: 2082
- Postgraduates: 600
- Location: Kochi, Kerala, India; 9.971°N 76.281°E
- Website: www.maharajas.ac.in

Maharaja's College is a government college located in Ernakulam, in the city of Kochi in Kerala, India. It was established in 1875, the college campus is spread over 100,000 square metres (25 acres) on the banks of Vembanad Lake. The infrastructure of the campus is a mix of old and modern architecture.

The college is ranked 53rd among colleges in India by the National Institutional Ranking Framework (NIRF) in 2024.

== Campus ==
=== Library ===
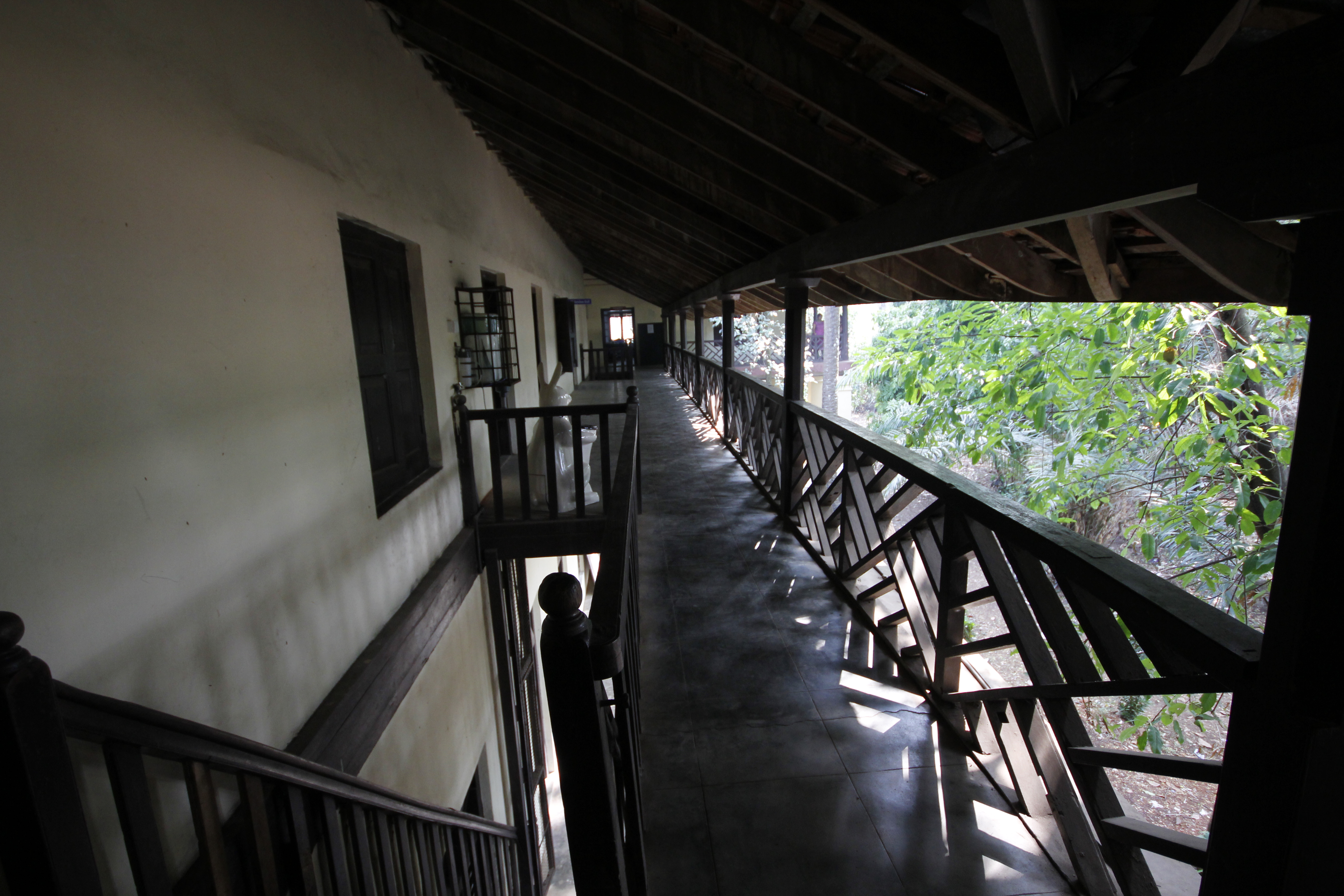
The view from the oldest part of the college.

The college library is 135 years old and has a collection of nearly one lakh (hundred thousand) books, including a collection of rare literature books. The reference section itself has 2000 books.

=== Sport facilities ===
The university has 18 acres (7.3 ha) of land specifically dedicated to sports, including a 400-meter synthetic track, football and cricket grounds, courts for field hockey, volleyball, basketball, kho-kho, kabaddi and badminton, futsal, table tennis, carrom, chess, wrestling, weightlifting, judo, powerlifting etc.

== Hostels ==
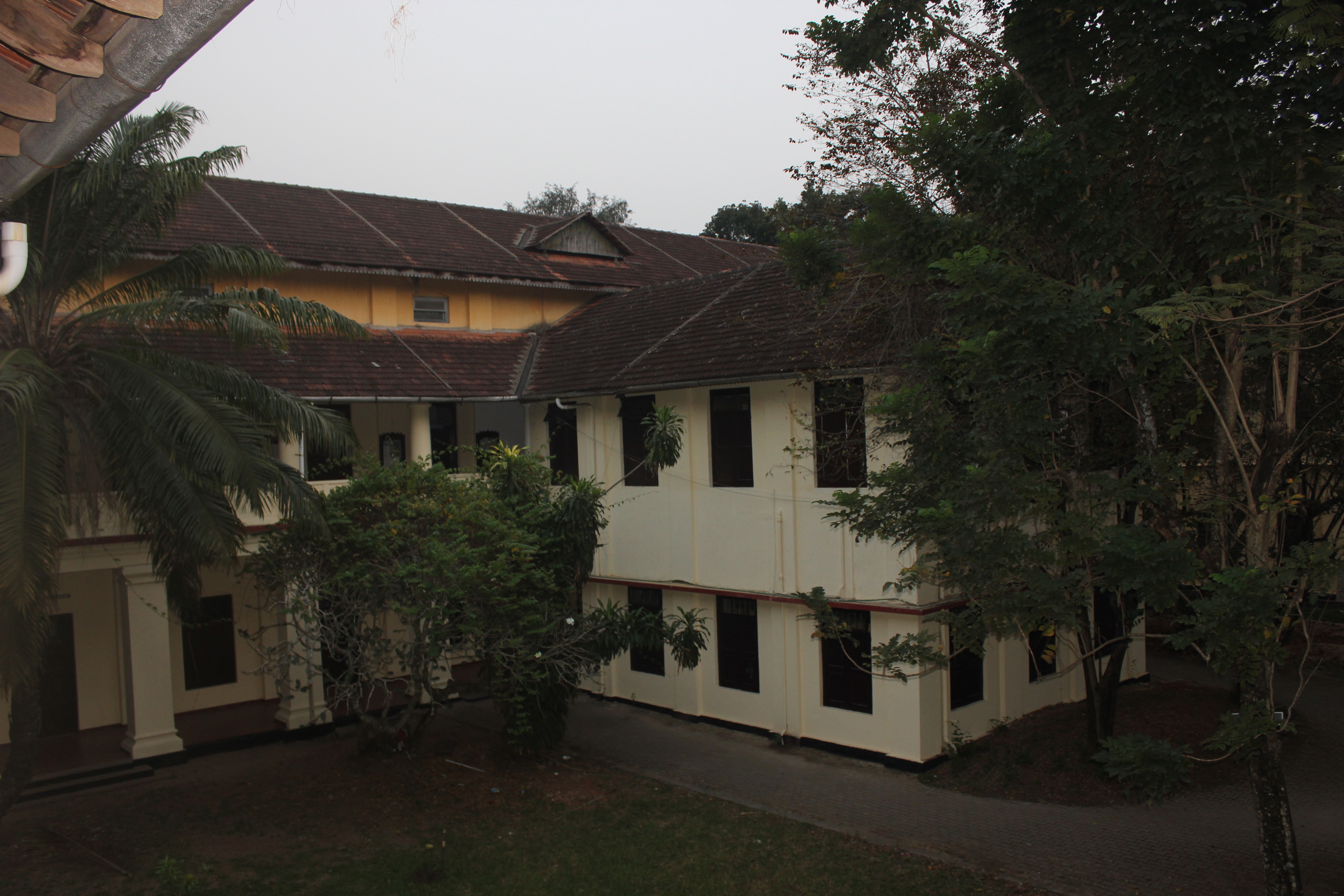
Old building that houses the Principal's Office at Maharaja's College

The Maharaja's College Rama Varma hostels include the new hostel for men and the ladies' hostel. The former has 90 rooms with a capacity of 240 students and two tutors; the latter has facilities for only 104 students and one tutor. Nowadays, the demand for accommodation in the ladies' hostel is greater than the availability due to the increase in the number of girl students. To remedy this situation, a concrete proposal for a women's hostel has been submitted to UGC during the IX plan.

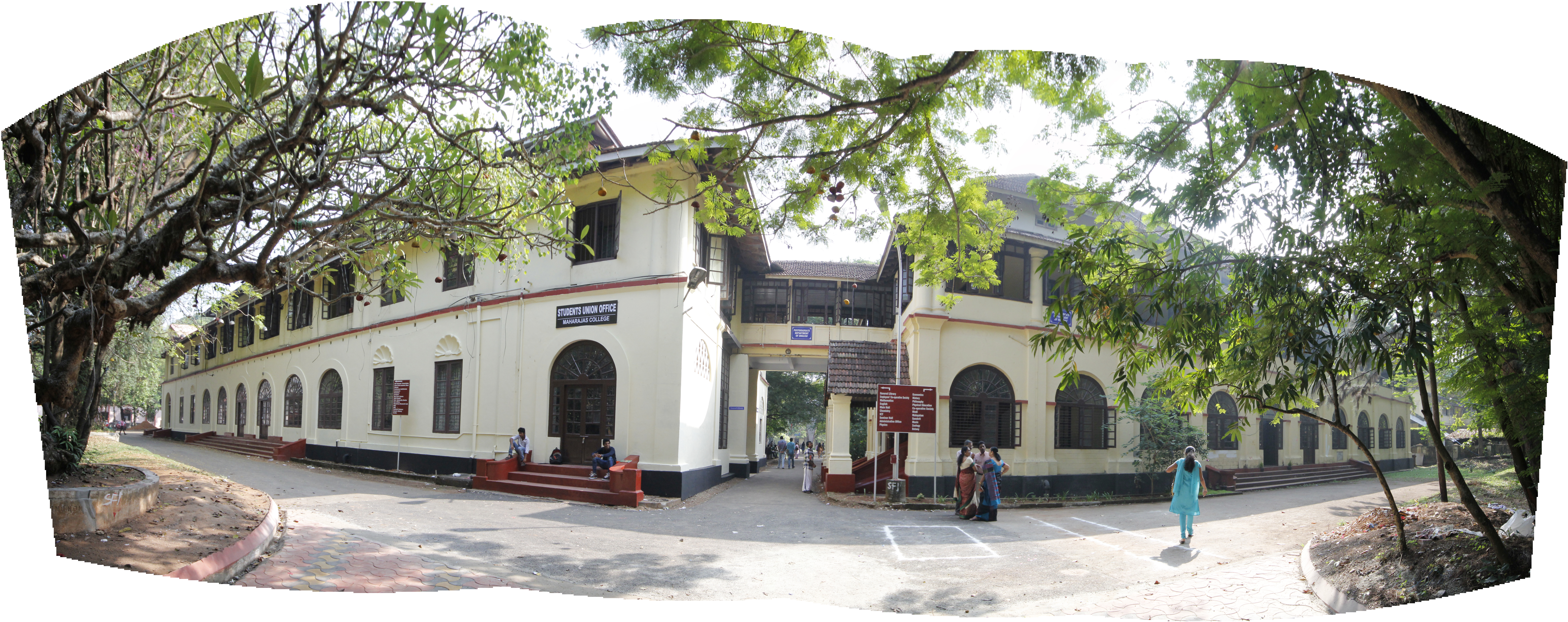
Entrance of the college.

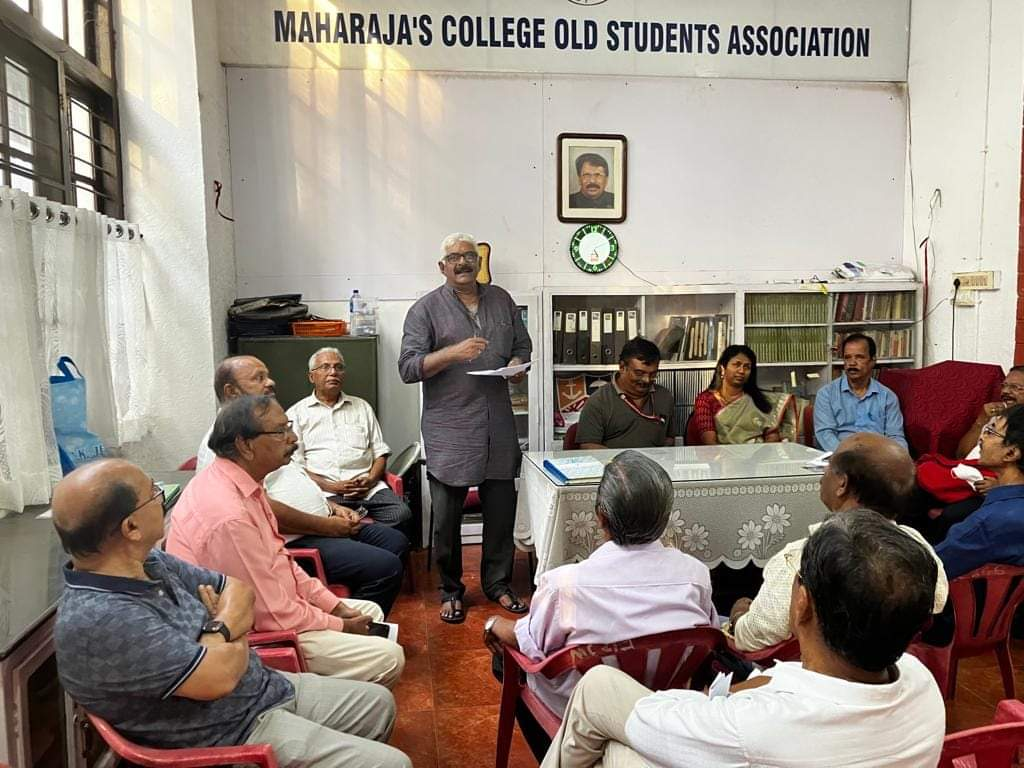
OSA meeting 2023

== Milestones ==
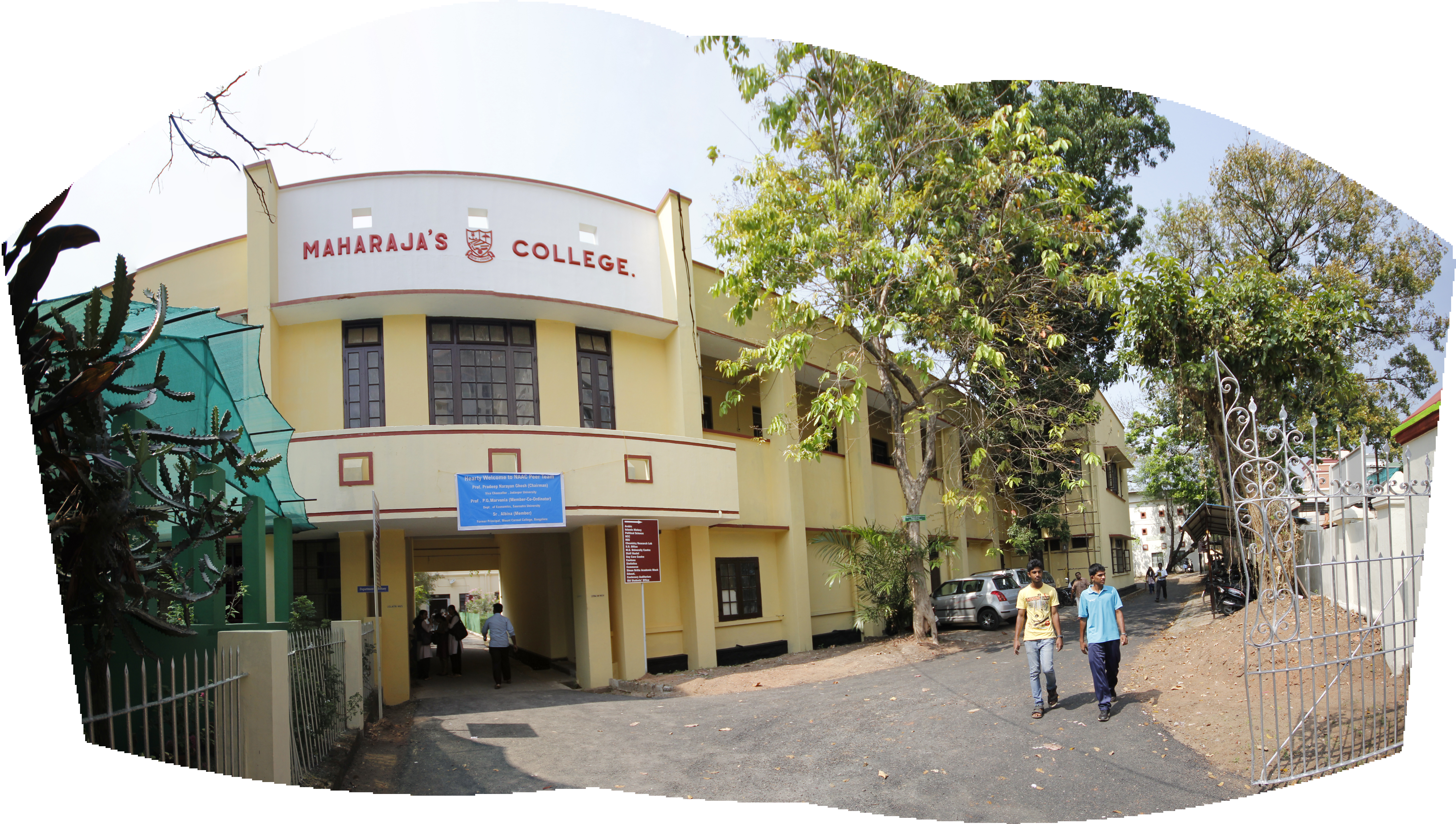
A panoramic view of the rear entrance of the college.

- 1875 - The Cochin Rajas Elementary school started by Cochin Sarkar is upgraded into a college. Mr. Alfred Forbes Sealy, M.A. took charge as the first principal. It was Mr. Sealy who had designed the building and hence the name Sealy block. F.A. (First examination in Arts) course started.
- 1908 - Intermediate course started
- 1909 - Two separate hostels started - one for Hindu students and another for Christian students
- 1910 - First college magazine published - on the occasion of the 60th birthday of the Cochin Maharaja, Sir Sri Rama Varma.
- 1925 - Golden Jubilee. Sir C.V. Raman and Dr. S. Radhakrishnan visited the college. The college got its present name - "Maharajas College". The college was raised to a first grade college providing instructions in Mathematics, Physics, Chemistry, Zoology, History and Economics affiliated to Madras University. Old Students Association formed.
- 1930 - Three new blocks added to the college. 15-acre (61,000 m^{2}) plot donated to the college - Maharajas ground established.
- 1935 - Diamond Jubily. B.Sc. Courses in Mathematics, Physics, Chemistry and Zoology started.
- 1947 - B.Sc. Botany started. Year of India's independence. Students' political activities reached new peaks. Student activists hoisted Indian national flag in the Campus and got brutally beaten up by the royal police.
- 1948 - The department of Chemistry that already had research facility started the first P.G. course.
- 1949 - Following the integration of Travancore and Cochin states, the college is transferred from Madras University to Travancore University.
- 1951 - New courses - B.A. (Hons.), M.A. Economics, B.Sc. (Hons.), M.Sc. Mathematics.
- 1954 - New course - M.Sc. Applied Chemistry.
- 1956 - Pre University course started. M.A. Malayalam and M.A. English started.
- 1957 - The college comes under Kerala University. M.Sc. Physics started.
- 1959 - New courses - B.A.Sanskrit, M.A. History, M.A. Hindi, M.Sc. Zoology.
- 1960 - First Ph.D. work completed by P S Raman (Department of Chemistry)
- 1964 - Pre University Course metamorphed into Pre Degree course. New courses - B.A. Politics, B.A. Philosophy
- 1968 - New courses - B.A.English, B.A. Islamic History, B.A. Arabic
- 1971 - New courses - M.A. Philosophy, M.A. politics, M.A. Sanskrit
- 1975 - Centennial - completed 100 years - celebrations in great style with science exhibitions, seminars, symposia etc.
- 1977 - New Centenary Auditorium inaugurated.
- 1979 - New course - M.A. Arabic.
- 1981 - New courses - M.A. Islamic History.
- 1983 - Affiliation changed to newly formed Mahatma Gandhi University.
- 1990 - Maharaja's College declared Centre of Excellence. Departments of Chemistry, Hindi, Malayalam and Physics recognised as research centres for research towards Ph.D., under Mahatma Gandhi University.
- 1993 - Maharaja's won overall championship of the Mahatma Gandhi University youth festival. A feat to be repeated in 1994, 1995, 1998 and 2000.
- 1995 - New course - M.Sc. Statistics.
- 1996 - New courses - B.Sc. Physics - Instrumentation and B.Sc. Environment and Water Management.
- 1997 - R. Shankar Award for the best Government College presented to Maharajas.
- 1998 - New course - B. A. Music
- 1999 - New course - B.Com. with Computer Applications.
- 2000 - Completes 125 glorious years. Accredited by National Assessment and Accreditation Council. Maharajas goes online.
- 2006 - Re-accredited by National Assessment and Accreditation Council at A - level.
- 2007 - Maharaja's College Ground gets synthetic tracks for conducting international athletic events. Students of the college win overall championship of the Mahatma Gandhi University Silver Jubilee youth festival.
- 2009 - Edusat facility installed. Becomes part of Ernakulam cluster of colleges.
- 2010 - Maharaja's wins overall championship of the Mahatma Gandhi University youth festival. College selected as a "College with Potential for Excellence" by the University Grants Commission.
- 2012 - New course - M.Com. with Finance.
- 2013 - Re-accredited (Third cycle) by National Assessment and Accreditation Council at A - level.
- 2013 - New course - B.A. Honors in Economics
- 2014 - Berlin Bench - the friend shade in memory of Berlin Babu was established
- 2017 - Mridula Gopi became first woman chairperson in 70 years
- 2020 - Integrated MA Archaeology 5-year course was added
- 2024 - Maharaja's wins overall championship of the Mahatma Gandhi University youth festival which took place in Kottayam.

== Notable alumni ==
- A. K. Antony, former Chief Minister of Kerala and Former Defence Minister of India
- Aashiq Abu, film director, producer
- Amal Neerad, film director, cinematographer
- Anju Joseph, singer
- Antony Varghese, actor
- Anu Sivaraman, judge, High Court of Kerala
- Anwar Rasheed, film director, producer
- Ashitha, author
- Babu Namboothiri, film actor
- Baburaj, film actor
- Balachandran Chullikkadu, poet, film actor, lyricist, screenplay writer
- Bibin George, actor and writer
- Biju Narayanan, playback singer
- Binoy Viswam, Former Member of Parliament
- C. V. Subramanian, mycologist, Shanti Swarup Bhatnagar Prize recipient
- Changampuzha, poet
- Chinmayananda Saraswati, founder of Chinmaya Mission & Vishwa Hindu Parishad
- Chitharesh Natesan, Mr. Universe, 2019
- Dileep, film actor
- John Paul, Indian scriptwriter, producer, author and actor.
- Jyothirmayi, film actress
- K. G. Balakrishnan, former Chief Justice of India
- K. K. Kochu, Dalit activist and writer
- Justice K. K. Usha, former Chief Justice of Kerala
- K. P. Appan, literary critic
- K. P. Thomas (artist), Indian contemporary artist
- K. R. Gowri Amma, former minister of Kerala
- K. S. Manilal, taxonomist
- K. Satchidanandan, poet
- K. Sukumaran, former judge of Bombay and Kerala High Courts
- K. V. Ramanadhan, writer
- Kalabhavan Abi, actor
- Krishnaswamy Kasturirangan, former chairman of the Indian Space Research Organisation
- M. Achuthan, orator
- M. Leelavathy, writer, academic
- M. N. Vijayan, writer
- Mammootty, film actor
- Mary Verghese, physician
- Mercy Ravi, writer, senior Mahila Congress leader and former MLA
- N. S. Madhavan, author, civil servant
- Nadirshah, actor, director
- O. Chandrashekar, Olympian and Asian Games Gold Medal winner in football
- P. K. Chathan Master, former minister of Kerala
- P. T. Thomas, MLA
- Priya A. S., writer
- R. Ramachandran, poet
- Radha Vinod Raju, IPS
- Rajeev Ravi, film director, cinematographer, producer
- S. D. Shibulal, co-founder and former CEO of Infosys
- Sabareesh Prabhaker, violinist
- Salim Kumar, film actor, comedian
- Sameer Thahir, film director, cinematographer
- Sankaradi, film actor
- Sarayu, actress
- Sebastian Paul, politician, former Member of Parliament
- Seethi Sahib, legislative assembly speaker, community leader
- Justice Shaji P. Chaly, Judge of Kerala High Court
- Shibu Chakravarthy, poet, lyricist
- Sneha Sreekumar, actress, classical dancer
- Subhash Chandran, writer
- Sujatha Mohan, singer
- Sunil P. Ilayidom, critic
- T. A. Venkitasubramanian, biochemist, Shanti Swarup Bhatnagar Prize recipient
- T. V. R. Shenoy, journalist, columnist
- T.M. Thomas Isaac (1956), Finance Minister of Kerala
- Tini Tom, film actor, comedian
- Vaikom Viswan, former LDF Convenor
- Vaisakhan (1956), writer, playwright, and screenwriter
- Vayalar Ravi, former Cabinet Minister for Overseas and Civil Aviation Affairs of India and Senior Congress Leader
- Venu Rajamony I.F.S, Diplomat and Ambassador of India to the Kingdom of Netherlands
- Vijayalakshmi, Malayalam poet
- Vyloppilli Sreedhara Menon, poet
- K.N. Ninan, Space Scientist, Vikram Sarabhai Space Centre

== Notable faculty ==
- Thuravoor Viswambharan
- M. Thomas Mathew
- K. G. Sankara Pillai
- George Irumbayam

== In popular culture ==
- Oru Mexican Aparatha
- Seniors (film)
- Poomaram
- Prakambanam
