= K. P. Appan =

Renowned literary critic in Malayalam

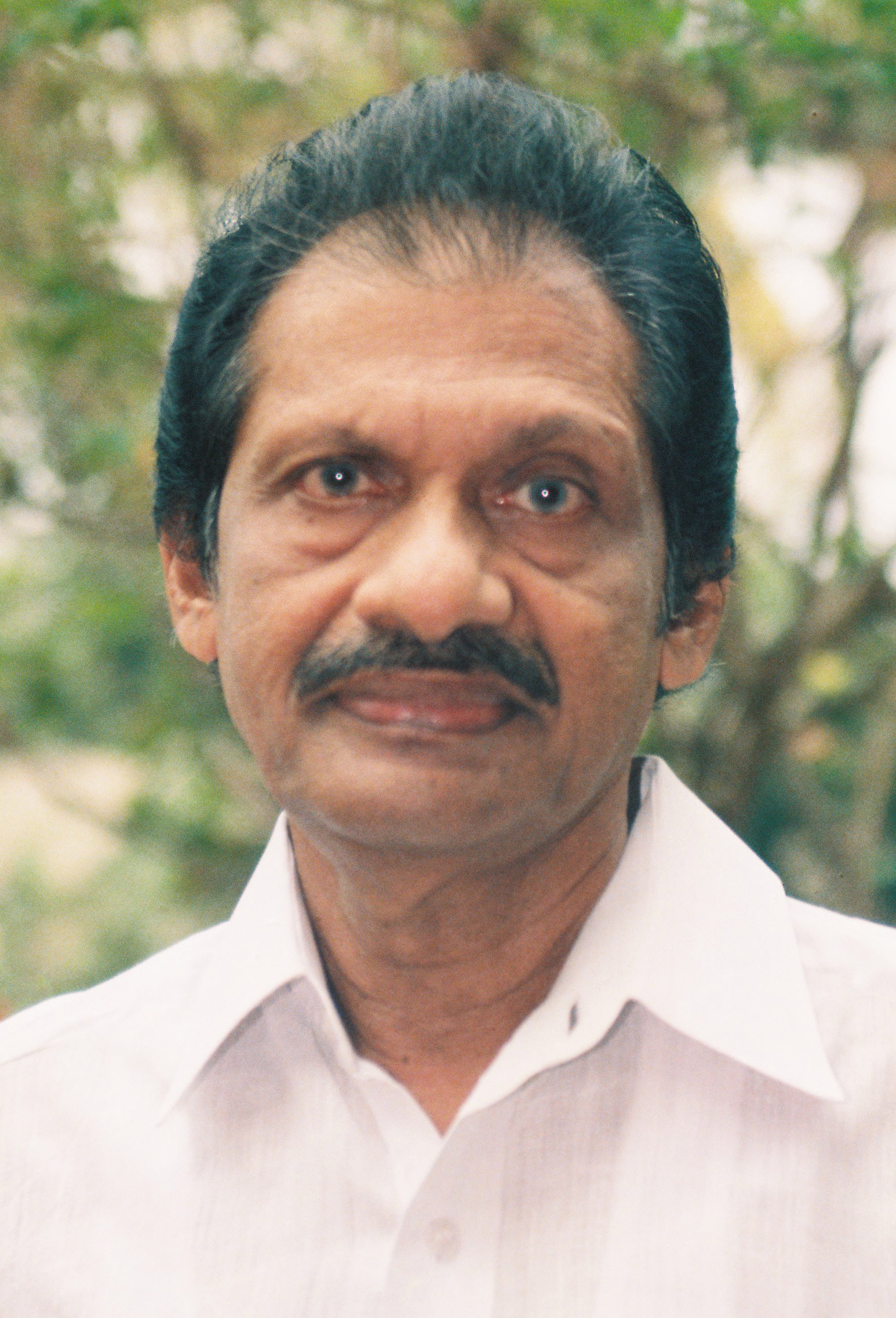
- Born: Karthikayil Padmanabhan Appan; 25 August 1936; Alappuzha, Kerala
- Died: 15 December 2008 (aged 72); Kayamkulam, Kerala
- Occupation: literary critic
- Parent(s): Poonthoppil Padmanabhan, Karthiyani

Karthikayil Padmanabhan Appan (25 August 1936 – 15 December 2008), better known as K. P. Appan, was a renowned literary critic in Malayalam. Born in Alappuzha (Alleppey), Kerala, Appan worked as a Professor of Malayalam literature at SN College, Kollam, Kerala.

== Biography ==
Appan was born to Padmanabhan of the Poonthoppil family and Karthiyani of the Karthikayil family in Alappuzha on 25 August 1936. Appan got his family name, Karthikayil, through matrilineal succession.

He had his schooling at Sanadana Dharma Vidyalaya there and graduation at SD College, Alappuzha. He took his post-graduation from Maharaja's College, Ernakulam. Appan began his career as a high school teacher and then joined UC College, Aluva, as a lecturer in Malayalam. Later he joined SN College, Cherthala, and then got transferred to SN College, Kollam, in 1972. He retired from there in 1992.

Appan died at a private hospital in Kayamkulam on 15 December 2008, aged 72. He had been battling with cancer for almost three years.

== Writing ==
He introduced modern European and Eastern literary visions in Malayalam literary criticism. Some of his works were Kshobhikkunnavarude Suvisesham (1972), Thiraskaram (1978), Kalahavum Viswasavum (1984), Marunna Malayala Novel (1988), Kalapam, Vivadam, Vilayiruthal (1992) Malayala Bhavana Mullyangalum Sangharshangalum (1992), Bible Velichathinte Kavacham (1994), Penayude Samaramukhangal (1995), Samayapravahavum Sahithyakalayum (1996), Abhimukha Sambashanangal (1997), UtharadhunikathaVarthamanavum Vamsavaliyum (1997).

== Awards and honors ==
In 2008, K. P. Appan won the Kendra Sahithya Academy Award for his collection of essays in Malayalam, Madhuram Ninte Jeevitham. The award was announced after his death.

#	Title	Title in Malayalam
1	Kshobhikkunnavarude Suvisesham	ക്ഷോഭിക്കുന്നവരുടെ സുവിശേഷം
2	Kalahavum Viswasavum	കലഹവും വിശ്വാസവും
3	Malayala Bhavana: Mullyangalum Sangharshangalum	മലയാള ഭാവന - മൂല്യങ്ങളും സംഘർഷങ്ങളും
4	Varakalum Varnangalum	വരകളും വർണങ്ങളും
5	Bible: Velichathinte Kavacham	ബൈബിൾ - വെളിച്ചത്തിന്റെ കവചം
6	Kalapam, Vivadam, Vilayiruthal	കലാപം, വിവാദം, വിലയിരുത്തൽ
7	Samayapravahavum Sahithyakalayum	സമയപ്രവാഹവും സാഹിത്യകലയും
8	Katha: Akhyanavum Anubhava Sathayum	കഥ: ആഖ്യാനവും അനുഭവ സത്യവും
9	Utharadhunikatha: Varthamanavum Vamsavaliyum	ഉത്തരാധുനികത: വർത്തമാനവും വംശാവലിയും
10	Innalekalile Anveshanaparishodanakal	ഇന്നലെകളിലെ അന്വേഷണപരിശോധനകൾ
11	Vivekashaliyaya Vayanakkara	വിവേകശാലിയായ വായനക്കാരാ
12	Rogavum Sahithyabhavanayum	രോഗവും സാഹിത്യഭാവനയും
13	Charithrathe Aghadahamakkiya Guru	ചരിത്രത്തെ അഗാധമാക്കിയ ഗുരു
14	Swargam theernnu pokunnu narakam nilanilkunnu	സ്വർഗം തീർന്നു പോകുന്നു നരകം നിലനിൽക്കുന്നു
15	Thiraskaram	തിരസ്കരണം
16	Marunna Malayala Novel	മാറുന്ന മലയാള നോവൽ
17	Penayude Samaramukhangal	പേനയുടെ സമരമുഖങ്ങൾ
18	Maduram Ninte jeevitham	മധുരം നിന്റെ ജീവിതം
19	Abhimuka Sambhashanakal	അഭിമുഖ സംഭാഷണങ്ങൾ
20	Charithrathe Ningalkoppam Kootuka	ചരിത്രത്തെ നിങ്ങൾക്കൊപ്പം കൂട്ടുക
