= Rajesh Chithira =

Indian writer

- Born: Pathanamthitta, Kerala, India
- Occupations: Poet, short story writer, novelist
- Writing career
- Notable works: Unmathathakalude Crash Landingukal; Tequila; Ulipechu; Jigsaw Puzzle; Aadi and Athma
- Notable awards: Indian Ruminations Poetry Award; Bharat Murali Poetry Award; Galleria Award; Ezhuthola Award; Expatriate Book Trust Award; 2011 Souhrudham Dot Com Award
- Website: www.rajeshchithira.com

Rajesh Chithira is an Indian poet, short story writer and novelist who writes in Malayalam language. Born in Pathanamthitta, in the south Indian state of Kerala, he has published anthologies containing poems and short stories such as Unmathathakalude Crash Landingukal, Tequila, Ulipechu and Jigsaw Puzzle and a children's novel, Aadi and Athma. He has received a number of awards which include Indian Ruminations Poetry Award, Bharat Murali Poetry Award, Galleria Award, Ezhuthola Award, Expatriate Book Trust Award, and Souhrudham Dot Com Award.

He was Born to V. N. Ramachandran and Santhamma as their eldest son. Rajesh Chithira is married to Nisha and the couple has two daughters, Akshaya and Saimeera. He lives in Dubai, in the United Arab Emirates.

== Selected bibliography ==
Title	Year	Form
Unmathathakalude Crash Landingukal	2011	Poetry anthology
Tequila	2014	Poetry anthology
Ulipechu	2016	Poetry anthology
Jigsaw Puzzle	2017	Short story anthology
Aadi and Athma	2021	Children's novel
Kallimullinte Ocha	2023	Poetry anthology

== See also ==
- Karunakaran (Malayalam writer)
- P. F. Mathews
