= S. Rajasekharan =

Indian writer (born 1946)

S Rajasekharan
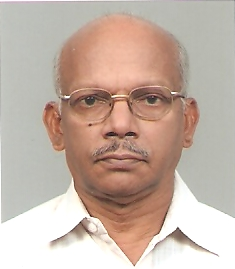
- Born: Cherthala, Alappuzha, Kerala
- Occupations: Poet, critic, professor

S Rajasekharan is an Indian literary critic and poetin the Malayalam language.

== Literary works ==
=== Literary criticism ===
- Kavithayute Jaathakam - (1977)
- Kavitha Velichatthilekku - (1985)
- Njaaninnivite ppatumpole - (1989)
- Kavitha Innu - (1991)
- Novalinte Vithaananggal - (1994)
- Vailoppilli: Kavithayum Darsanavum - (1994)
- Gopuram Thakarkkunna Silpi - (1999)
- Vailoppilli Sreedharamenon - (2001)
- Paattuprasthaanam: Prathirodhavum Samanvayavum - (2006)
- Navodhanantharakavitha - Literary criticisms - (2008)
- Paristhithidarsanam Malayalakavithayil - (2010)
- Navothhaanananthara Novel (2016)

=== History of literature ===
- Malayalam: Bhashayum Sahithyavum -(2007)

=== Studies in culture ===
- Malayaliyute Malayalam - (2000)
- Keralatthe Veentum Bhranthaalaya maakkukayo? - (2003)
- Vidyabhyasam punarnirvachikkumpol - (2006)
- Utsavanggalil nashtamaakunnathu - (2009)
- Keralathinte Samskarikaparinamam (in printing)
- Pinvicharangal (2013)
- Sthreevaadam : Utalum Parisarangalum (2016)

=== Poetry ===
- Nilaavinte Krowryam - (1988)
- Pakaliranggumpol - (1999)
- Kuttikal Uranggunnilla - (2010)
- Penma (2015)

=== Travel ===
- Europpil Manjukalath - (2012)
- Ruthubedangalil Yooroppiloote (2016, 2018)
- Australia : adhinivesangalute puthulokam (In printing)

=== Books edited ===
- Oyenvikkavitha - (1986)
- Vailoppillikkavithaasameeksha - (1986)
- Kavitha Vithayum Koytthum - (1995)
- Nammute Bhaasha (by E M S Namboodirippadu) - (1997)
- Sarvakalaasaalaa Vidyaabhyaasam: Puthiya Sameepanam - (2003)
- Paristhithikkavithakal - (2006)
- 51 Kapsule Kathakal - (2007)
- Anthonio Gramshiyum Samskarikapatanavum - (2008)
- Ini njaanunarnnirikkaam - (2009)
- Eeyemmesum Aadhunikathayum - (2012)
- Saamskaarikathayute sanchaarangal (2015)
- saamskaarikaraashtreeyam : paatavum prayogavum(2016)
- Malayalakavitha Irupathaam Noottaantil - (in printing)
