= Culture of Kerala =

Culture and traditions of Kerala

Centuries

Location of Kerala in India

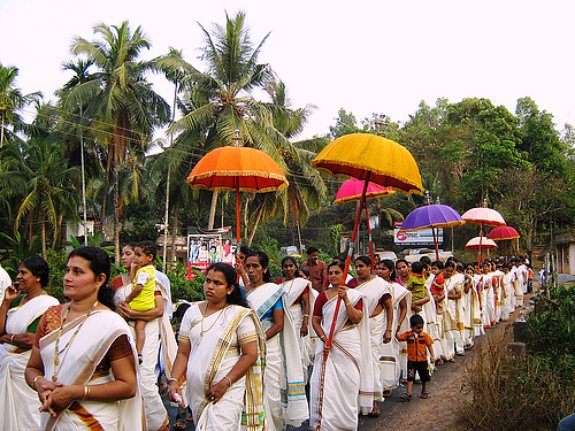
Temple Procession in Kanhangad

The culture of Kerala has developed over the past Centuries , with influences from other parts of India and abroad. It is defined by its antiquity and the organic continuity sustained by the Malayali people. Modern Kerala society took shape owing to migrations from different parts of India and abroad throughout Classical Antiquity.

Kerala traces its non-prehistoric cultural genesis to its membership (around the AD 3rd century) in a vaguely defined historical region known as Thamizhagom – where different regions spoke closely related but unique dialects. At that time, the music, dance, and literature (Sangam- a vast corpus of Tamil literature composed between 1,500–2,000 years ago) found in Kerala were all similar to that found in the rest of Thamizhagom (today's Tamil Nadu and certain southern parts of karnataka and Andhra Pradhesh). The culture of Kerala evolved through the Sanskritization of Dravidian ethos, revivalism of religious movements and reform movements against caste discrimination.

Strong communitarian values, wit, and an appreciation for social progressivism are commonly associated with Malayali culture.

== Performing arts ==
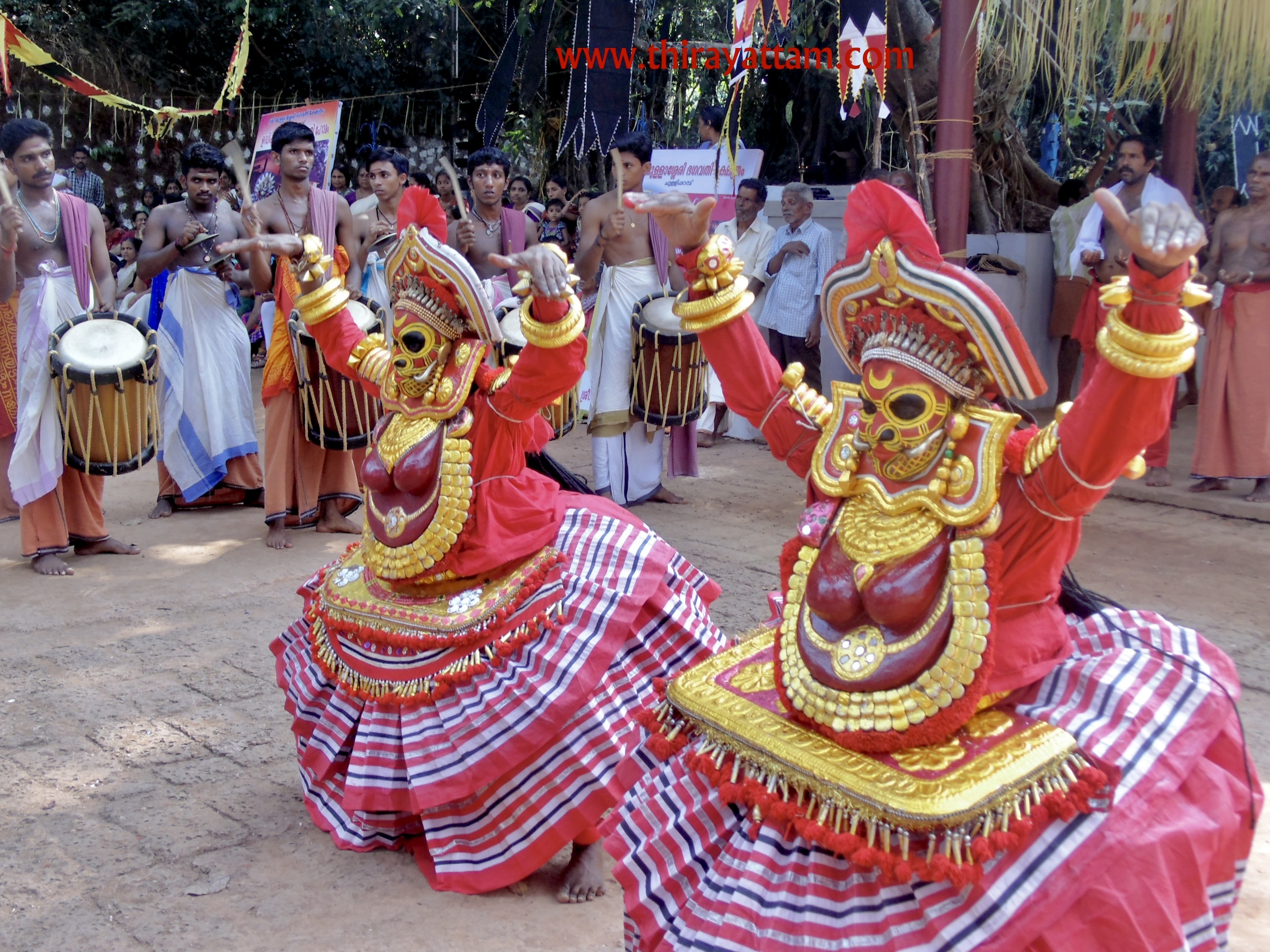
Thirayattam -( Bagavathi vellattu )

Native traditions of classical performing arts include koodiyattom, a form of Sanskrit drama or theatre and a UNESCO-designated Human Heritage Art. Kathakali (from katerumbu ("story") and kali ("performance")) is a 500-year-old form of dance-drama that interprets ancient epics; a popularized offshoot of kathakali is Kerala Natanam (developed in the 20th century by dancer Guru Gopinath). Meanwhile, koothu is a more light-hearted performance mode, akin to modern comedy; an ancient art originally confined to temple sanctuaries, it was later popularized by Mani Madhava Chakyar. Other Keralite performing arts include mohiniyaattam ("dance of the enchantress"), which is a type of graceful choreographed dance performed by women and accompanied by musical vocalizations. Thullal, Thirayattam, padayani, and theyyam are other important Keralite performing arts. Thirayattam is one of the most outstanding Ethnic art of Kerala. This vibrant ritualistic annual performing art form enacted in courtyards of "Kaavukal"(sacred groves) and village shrine.

Kerala also has several tribal and folk art forms. For example, Kummattikali, the colorful mask-dance of South Malabar, is performed during the festival of Onam. The Kannyar Kali dances (also known as Desathukali) are fast-moving, militant dances attuned to rhythmic devotional folk songs and asuravadyas. Other performance genres have ties to Christianity or Islam. These include oppana, which is widely popular among Keralite Muslims and is native to Malabar. Oppana incorporates group dance accompanied by the beat of rhythmic hand-clapping and Vishal vocalizations. Margam Kali is a round group dance of Kerala practiced by Saint Thomas Christians.

However, many of these native art forms largely play to tourists or at youth festivals and are not as popular among ordinary Keralites. Thus, more contemporary forms – including those heavily based on the use of often risqué and politically incorrect mimicry and parody – have gained considerable mass appeal in recent years. Indeed, contemporary artists often use such modes to mock socioeconomic elites. In recent decades, Malayalam Cinema, yet another mode of widely popular artistic expression, have provided a distinct and indigenous Keralite alternative to both Bollywood and Hollywood.

=== Music ===
The ragas and talas of lyrical and devotional Carnatic music – another native product of South India – dominates Keralite classical musical genres. Swathi Thirunal Rama Varma, a 19th-century king of Travancore and patron and composer of music, was instrumental in popularising carnatic music in early Kerala. Additionally, Kerala has its own native music system, sopanam, which is a lugubrious and step-by-step rendition of raga-based songs. It is Sopanam, for example, that provides the background music used in Kathakali. The wider traditional music of Kerala also includes melam (including the paandi and panchari variants), as style of percussive music performed at temple-centered festivals using an instrument known as the chenda. Up to 150 musicians may comprise the ensembles staging a given performance; each performance, in turn, may last up to four hours. Panchavadyam is a differing type of percussion ensemble consisting of five types of percussion instruments; these can be used by up to one hundred artists in certain major festivals. In addition to these, percussive music is also associated with various uniquely Keralite folk arts forms. Lastly, the popular music of Kerala, as in the rest of India, is dominated by the filmi music of Indian cinema. The most remembered name in Kerala music culture is of Great Indian musician K. J. Yesudas.

== Literature ==
The word Malayāḷalipi (Meaning: Malayalam script) written in the Malayalam script

The Thunchath Ezhuthachan Malayalam University is situated at Thunchan Parambu, Tirur, Malappuram

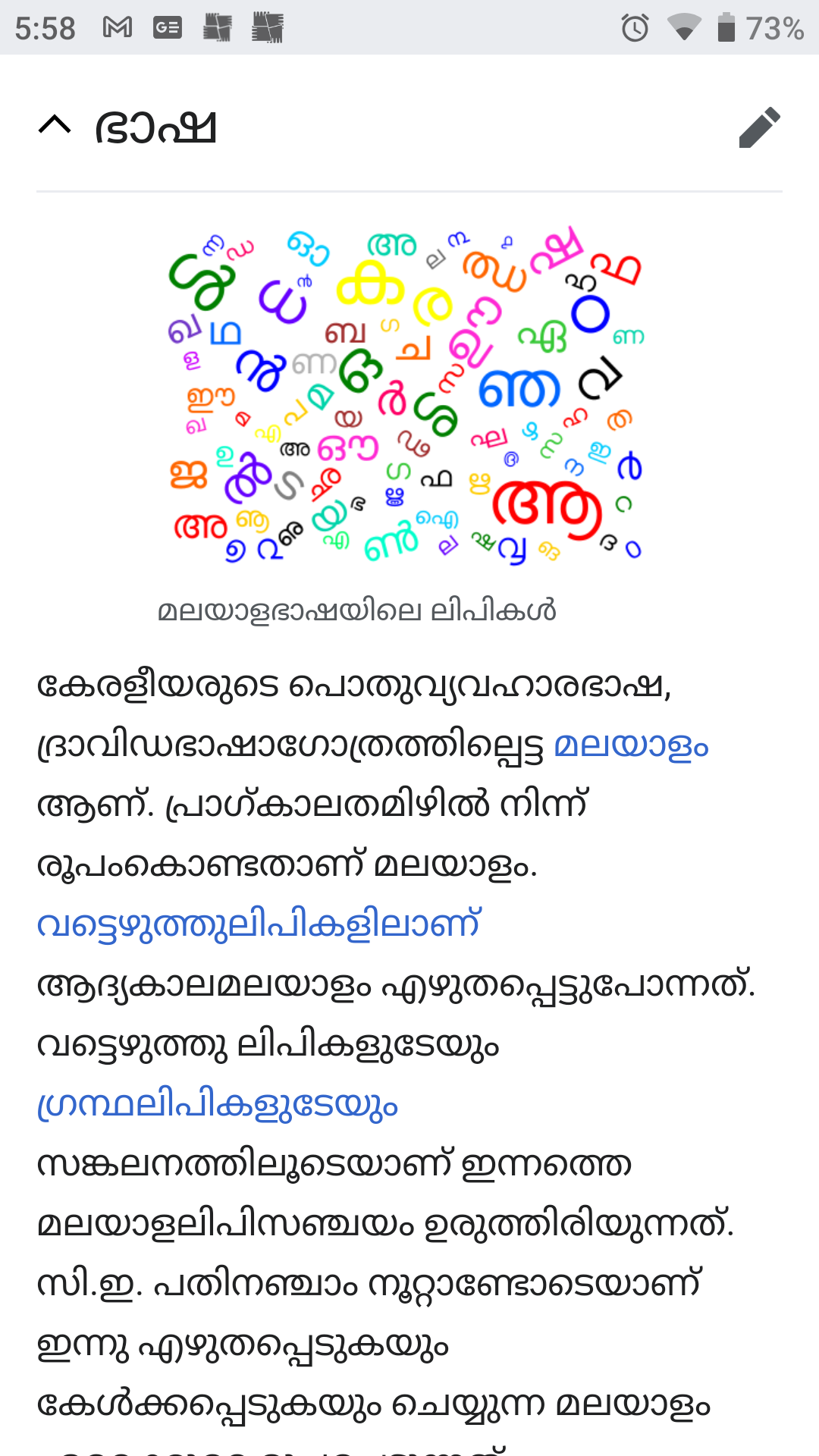
Malayalam in mobile phone

The Sangam literature can be considered as the ancient predecessor of Malayalam. Malayalam literature is ancient in origin, and includes such figures as the 14th century Niranam poets (Madhava Panikkar, Sankara Panikkar and Rama Panikkar), whose works mark the dawn of both modern Malayalam language and indigenous Keralite poetry. Some linguists claim that an inscription found from Edakkal Caves, Wayanad, which belongs to 3rd century CE (approximately 1,800 years old), is the oldest available inscription in Malayalam, as they contain two modern Malayalam words, Ee (This) and Pazhama (Old), those are not found even in the Oldest form of Tamil. Sangam works can be considered as the ancient predecessor of Malayalam. The origin of Malayalam calendar dates back to year 825 CE. It is generally agreed that the Quilon Syrian copper plates of 849/850 CE is the available oldest inscription written in Old Malayalam. For the first 600 years of Malayalam calendar, the literature mainly consisted of the oral Ballads such as Vadakkan Pattukal (Northern Songs) in North Malabar and Thekkan Pattukal (Southern songs) in Southern Travancore. The earliest known literary works in Malayalam are Ramacharitam and Thirunizhalmala, two epic poems written in Old Malayalam. Malayalam literature has been presented with 6 Jnanapith awards, the second-most for any Dravidian language and the third-highest for any Indian language.

Designated a "Classical Language in India" in 2013, it developed into the current form mainly by the influence of the poets Cherusseri Namboothiri (Born near Kannur), Thunchaththu Ezhuthachan (Born near Tirur), and Poonthanam Nambudiri (Born near Perinthalmanna), in the 15th and the 16th centuries of Common Era. Kunchan Nambiar, a Palakkad-based poet also significantly influenced the growth of modern Malayalam literature in its early form, through a new literary branch called Thullal. The prose literature, criticism, and Malayalam journalism, began following the latter half of 18th century CE. The first travelogue in any Indian language is the Malayalam Varthamanappusthakam, written by Paremmakkal Thoma Kathanar in 1785.

The Bharathappuzha river, also known as River Ponnani, and its tributaries, have played a major role in the development of modern Malayalam Literature. The words used in many of the Arabi Malayalam works those date back to 16th–17th centuries of Common Era are also very closer to the modern Malayalam language. Unnayi Variyar of 17th–18th centuries, based at Thrissur, played a major role in the development of Attakkatha Literature. The words used in many of the Arabi Malayalam works those date back to 16th–17th centuries of Common Era are also very closer to the modern Malayalam language. The Triumvirate of poets (Kavithrayam: Kumaran Asan, Vallathol Narayana Menon and Ulloor S. Parameswara Iyer) are recognized for moving keralian poetry away from archaic sophistry and metaphysics and towards a more lyrical mode. The modern Malayalam grammar is based on the book Kerala Panineeyam written by A. R. Raja Raja Varma in late 19th century CE.

In the second half of the 20th century, Jnanpith winning poets and writers like G. Sankara Kurup, S. K. Pottekkatt, Thakazhi Sivasankara Pillai, M. T. Vasudevan Nair, O. N. V. Kurup, and Akkitham Achuthan Namboothiri, had made valuable contributions to the modern Malayalam literature. Later, writers like O. V. Vijayan, Kamaladas, M. Mukundan, Arundhati Roy, and Vaikom Muhammed Basheer, have gained international recognition. Poets like Changampuzha, Uroob, Edasseri Govindan Nair, M. T. Vasudevan Nair, Kamala Surayya, Pallathu Raman, and Edappally Raghavan Pillai also contributed to bring Malayalam poetry to the common man. Later, such contemporary writers as Booker Prize winner Arundhati Roy (whose 1996 semi-autobiographical bestseller The God of Small Things is set in the Kottayam town of Ayemenem) have garnered international recognition. From 1970 to early 1990s, a lot of Malayalam Novelists and story writers contributed to the Literature of Kerala. The contributions from Thakazhi Sivashankara Pillai, Vaikom Muhammed Basheer P. Kesavadev, Uroob, OV Vijayan, T Padmanabhan, Sethu, Perumbadavam Sreedharan, Kovilan, M. Mukundan, Kakkanadan, Anand and Paul Zacharia, have been remarkable. Significant contributions from poets and songwriters such as Vayalar Rama Varma, P. Bhaskaran and ONV Kurup have influenced contemporary literature. Critics such as Kuttikrishna Marar and M.P. Paul till the sixties and later, M Krishnan Nair, S. Gupthan Nair, M. K. Sanu, Sukumar Azhikode, K.P. Appan, Narendra Prasad and M. Leelavathy have added value by providing critical analysis of the books written during the recent past. The writers like Kavalam Narayana Panicker have contributed much to Malayalam drama. Contemporary Malayalam literature deals with social, political, and economic life context. The tendency of the modern poetry is often towards political radicalism.

Arabi Malayalam (also called Mappila Malayalam and Moplah Malayalam) was the traditional Dravidian language of the Mappila Muslim community in Malabar Coast. The poets like Moyinkutty Vaidyar and Pulikkottil Hyder have made notable contributions to the Mappila songs, which is a genre of the Arabi Malayalam literature. The Arabi Malayalam script, otherwise known as the Ponnani script, is a writing system – a variant form of the Arabic script with special orthographic features – which was developed during the early medieval period and used to write Arabi Malayalam until the early 20th century CE. Though the script originated and developed in Kerala, today it is predominantly used in Malaysia and Singapore by the migrant Muslim community.

== Folklore ==
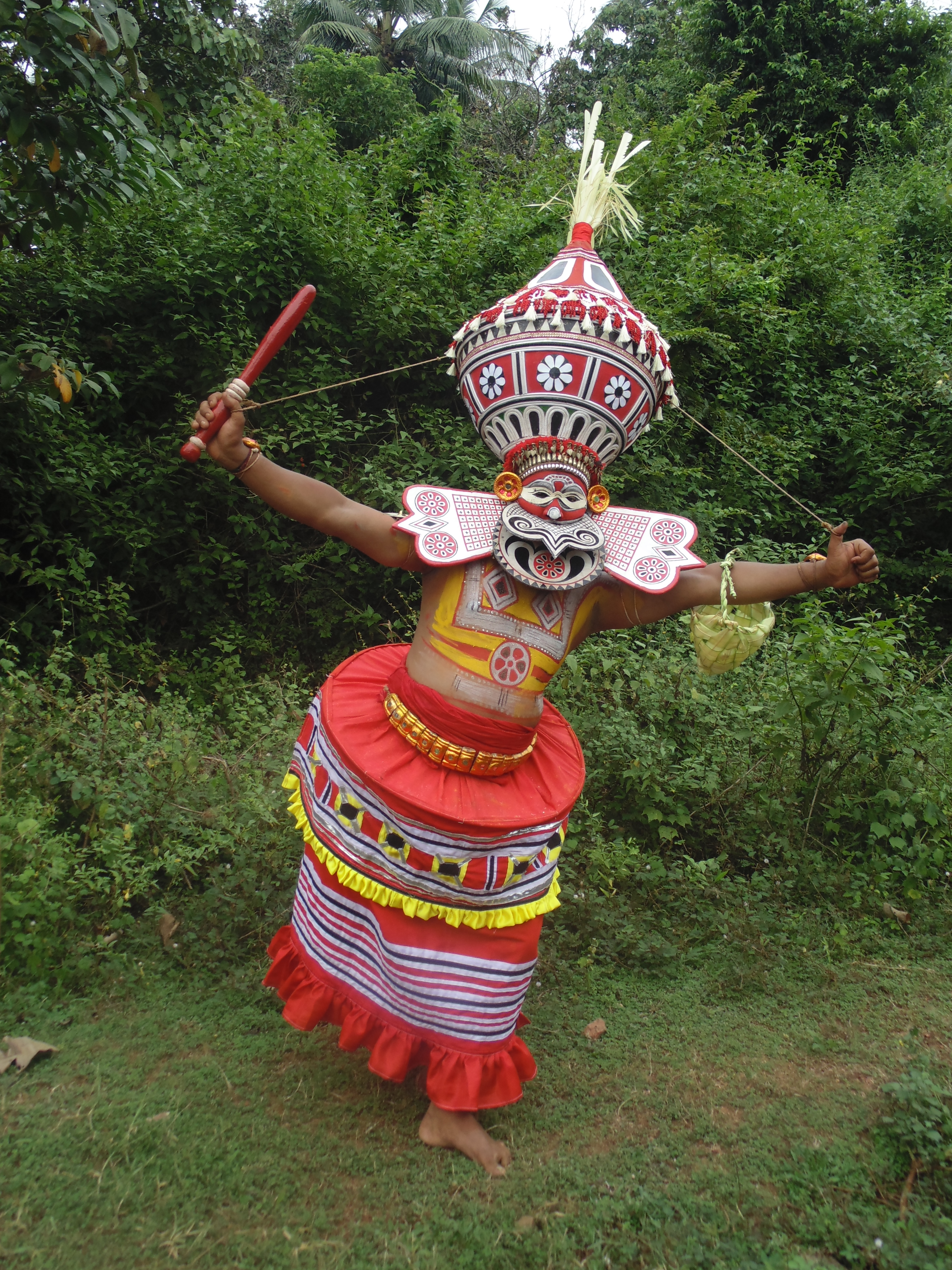
Thirayattam (Pookkutty Thira)

Kerala folklore is influenced by agricultural patterns and work in the region. Sowing, planting of nharu (seedling), clearing out the weeds, harvests etc. are the different stages of agriculture which have their typical rituals. Numerous songs and performing arts accompany these stages, such as Njattupattu, which are songs sung during the seedling time. Kanyar Kali, Padayani, Mudiyettu, Thirayattam, Malavayiyattam, Theyyam, Kothamooriyattam, Nira, Puthari, etc. are some of the ritual folklore of Kerala. Much of Kerala folk culture, including festival dates, was codified under the rule of Kolathiris, the Kings of Kolathunadu.

The folk arts of Kerala can be broadly classified under two heads: ritualistic and non-ritualistic. Ritualistic folk arts can be further divided into two: devotional and magical. Devotional folk arts, such as theyyam, thirayattam, poothamthira, kanyarkali, and kummatti, are performed to propitiate a particular God or Goddess. Forms like panappattu and thottampattu are composed in the form of songs. In kolkali, margamkali, daffumuttukkali, etc., the ritualistic element is not very strong. Magical folk arts seek to win general prosperity for a community or exorcise evil spirits or to beget children. Gandharvas and nagas are worshipped to win these favours. The magical folk arts include pambinthullal, pooppadathullal, kolamthullal, malayankettu, etc.

- Theyyam is a traditional ritualistic dance form from the northern part of Kerala, India, that is believed to have originated over 1,500 years ago. It is a vibrant and colorful art form that involves elaborate makeup, costumes, and dance performances that are often accompanied by music and chanting. The dance form is performed by male members of certain communities and is believed to invoke the powers of gods and goddesses to bless the community with prosperity and protection. Theyyam is performed during the winter months between October and May.
- Padayani is a traditional folk art form from the southern part of Kerala, India, that involves elaborate processions and performances. It is usually performed during the festival of Onam, which falls in the month of August or September. The art form involves the use of masks, costumes, and props, and the performers dance to the beats of traditional percussion instruments like chenda and thakil. The masks used in Padayani are typically made of wood, bamboo, or clay and are adorned with bright colors and intricate designs. The performance is often based on mythological stories or social issues and is intended to entertain and educate the audience.
- Thirayattam is a ritualistic performance that is frequently performed in the courtyards of temples dedicated to goddesses like Kali, Durga, and Bhadrakali. The performance involves elaborate costumes and makeup, and the performers dance to the beats of traditional percussion instruments like chenda and thakil. Thirayattam is performed by members of certain communities and is believed to invoke the powers of goddesses to bless the community with prosperity and protection. The art form is usually performed during the festival of Onam, which falls in the month of August or September.

== Politics ==
The majority of Keralites belong to either one of the political alliances, namely the United Democratic Front (UDF) or Left Democratic Front (LDF). Regional parties include Indian Union Muslim League (IUML), various factions of Kerala Congress, various factions of Revolutionary Socialist Party, and a host of smaller parties. Religious leaders have high influence in Kerala political movements. Many Keralites nostalgically recall their younger days which they spent debating politics in "chaya kadas" (Local Tea Vending Places).

== Martial arts and sports ==
Kerala has its own indigenous form of martial art, Kalarippayattu, derived from the words kalari ("place", "threshing floor", or "battlefield") and payattu ("exercise" or "practice"). Influenced by both Kerala's Brahminical past and Ayurvedic medicine, kalaripayattu is attributed by oral tradition to Parasurama. After some two centuries of suppression by British colonial authorities, it is now experiencing strong comeback among Keralites while also steadily gaining worldwide attention. Other popular ritual arts include theyyam and poorakkali, which originate from northern Malabar, the northernmost part of Kerala. Kolkkali is a folk art performed in Malabar region of Kerala, India. The dance performers move in a circle, striking small sticks and keeping rhythm with special steps.

In modern times, traditional ritual and martial arts been largely supplanted by more popular sports such as cricket, kabaddi, soccer, badminton, and others. The Kochi Tuskers Kerala, who play in the Indian Premier League (IPL), are from Kerala. Kerala is currently the home of the football clubs kerala blasters and Gokulam Kerala FC. Viva Kerala and FC Kochin were the other two major football clubs from the state in the past.

== Calendar ==
The Malayalam calendar, Kerala's indigenous ancient solar calendar, is used primarily for timing agricultural and religious activities.

== Animals in Kerala culture ==
=== Elephants ===
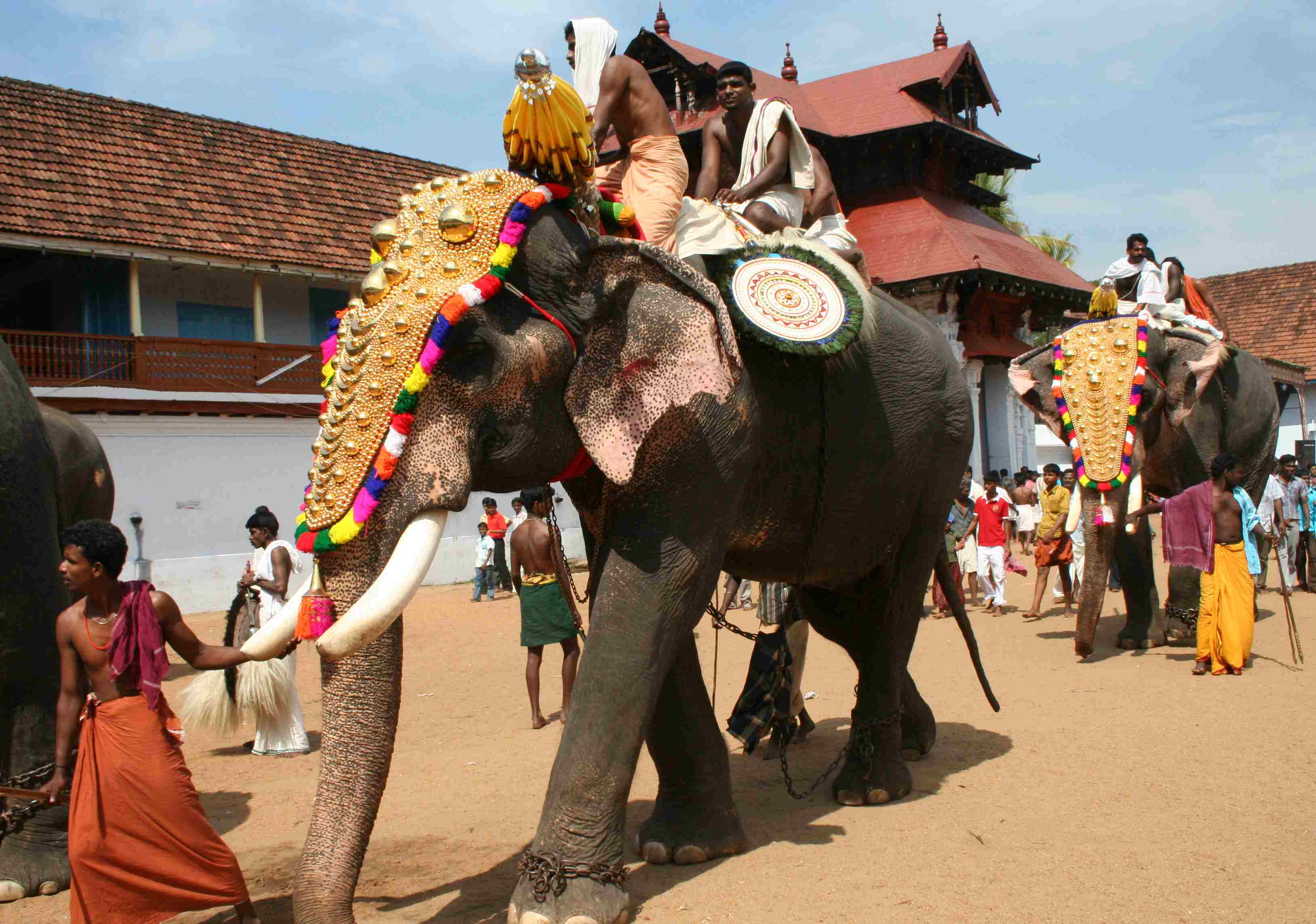
Caparisoned elephants during Sree Poornathrayesa temple festival. The Elephants of Kerala are an integral part of the daily life in Kerala.

Elephants have been an integral part of the culture of the state. Almost all of the local festivals in Kerala include at least one richly caparisoned elephant. Kerala is home to the largest domesticated population of elephants in India—about 700 Indian elephants, owned by temples as well as individuals. These elephants are mainly employed for the processions and displays associated with festivals celebrated all around the state. More than 10,000 festivals are celebrated in the state annually and some animal lovers have sometimes raised concerns regarding the overwork of domesticated elephants during them. In Malayalam literature, elephants are referred to as the "sons of the sahya". The elephant is the state animal of Kerala and is featured on the emblem of the Government of Kerala.

=== Snakes ===
Sarpa Kavu (meaning Sacred Grove of the Serpent) is a typically small traditional grove of trees seen in the Kerala state of South India. These pristine groves usually have representations of several Naga Devatas (serpent gods), which were worshipped by the joint families or taravads. This was part of Nagaradhana (snake worship) which was prevalent among Keralites during past centuries. It had been practised by nearly every Hindu community in Kerala ranging from Nambudiri Brahmins to tribal communities.

== Festivals ==
=== Onam ===
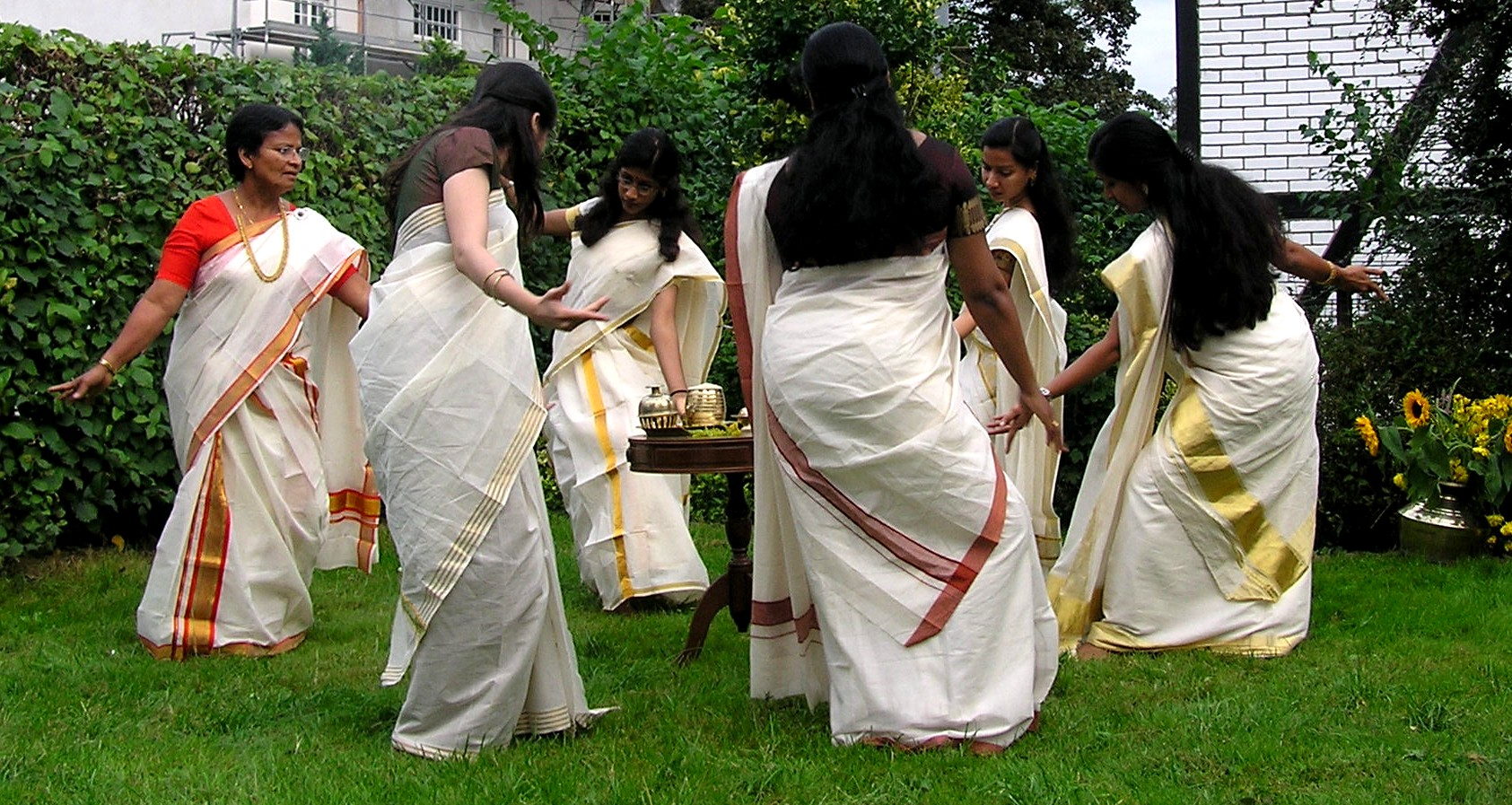
Thruvathira is a dance in a circular formation done by ladies as a way to relax after hours of cooking the sadhya. It is a tradition done during Onam.

(Malayalam: ഓണം) Onam is a harvest festival celebrated by the people of Kerala. It is the state festival of Kerala, with state holidays on 4 days starting from Onam Eve (Uthradom) to the 4th Onam Day. Onam Festival falls during the Malayalam month of Chingam (Aug – Sep) and marks the commemoration of Vamana, an avatar of Vishnu, and the subsequent homecoming of King Mahabali, who Malayalees consider to be a just and fair king who was exiled to the underworld. Some cultural elements in Onam are Vallam Kali, Pulikkali, Pookkalam, Onatthappan, Thumbi Thullal, Onavillu, Kazhchakkula, Onapottan, and Atthachamayame.

During the festival, the 'Onam Sadhya' (Onam Feast) is held, with dishes served on banana leaves, and celebrants don 'Onam Kodi' (new dress for the special occasion).

=== Temple festivals ===
Kerala has a large number of temples. The temples celebrate annual festivals unique to the region and sometimes unique to each temple. Each temple describes each interesting history behind its creation. In the Malabar, distinct art form called Theyyam attract tourists, and mini carnivals are also held along with temple festivals. Thrissur pooram is one of the most popular temple festivals.

== See also ==
- Architecture of Kerala
- History of Kerala
- Economy of Kerala
- Geography of Kerala
