= South Indian culture =

South Indian culture refers to the cultural region typically covering the South Indian states of Tamil Nadu, Karnataka, Kerala, Andhra Pradesh, and Telangana. The idea of South India is closely linked to the Dravidian ethnic and linguistic identity and therefore it can also refer to groups in central India such as the Gondi and the Kui. Similar to India it is difficult to define a common essence of South Indian culture. That being some common threads include the eternal universe through the celebration of the beauty of the body and femininity. It is exemplified through its dance, clothing, and sculptures.

== Traditional clothing ==
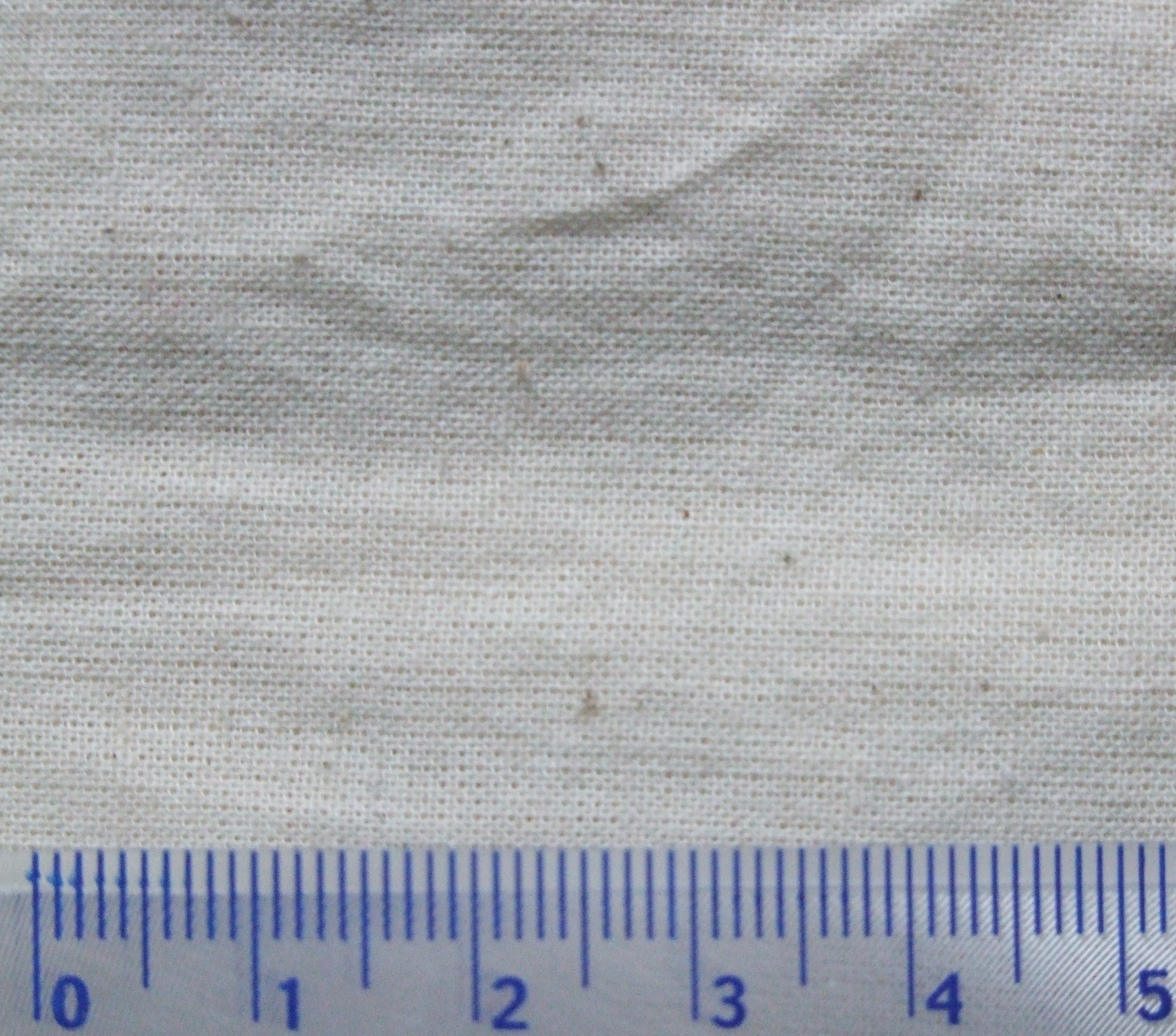
The weave of Calico sample from a shopping bag shown against a centimetre scale.

The clothing of South India is highly diverse, but is connected by a common cultural ancestry. South Indian women are known to traditionally wear the sari while the men wear a type of sarong, which could be either a white dhoti or a colourful lungi with typical batik patterns. However, these are but a few of an expansive tradition of fashion. The saree, being an unstitched drape, enhances the shape of the wearer while only partially covering the midriff. In Indian philosophy, the navel of the Supreme Being is considered as the source of life and creativity. Hence by tradition, the stomach and the navel is to be left unconcealed, though the philosophy behind the costume has largely been forgotten. This makes the realization of sharira-mandala, where in Angikam bhuvanam yasya (the body is your world) unites with the shaarira-mandala (the whole universe), as expressed in the Natyashastra. These principles of the sari, also hold for other forms of drapes, like the lungi or mundu or panchey (a white lungi with colourful silk borders in kannada), worn by men. The lungi is draped over clockwise or counterclockwise and is tied at the back or fixed just along the waistline. It's sometimes lifted to the knee and tied at the waist leisurely or just held in hand to speed up walking.

Traditionally, South Indian men do not cover their upper body. Sometimes, in a formal situation, a piece of cloth may cover the upper body. Certain temples in South India even ban men from wearing upper-body garments when inside the temple. In Andhra and parts of north Karnataka, men wear kachche panchey where it is tied at back by taking it between legs. A similar pattern is seen in women. All over the peninsular coastal region, men wear coloured lungis and women wear saris in a manner of tying them at the back.

Calico, a plain-woven textile made from unbleached, and often not fully processed, cotton, was originated at Calicut (Kozhikode), from which the name of the textile came, in South India, now Kerala, during the 11th century, where the cloth was known as Chaliyan. The raw fabric was dyed and printed in bright hues, and calico prints later became popular in the Europe.

== Cuisine ==
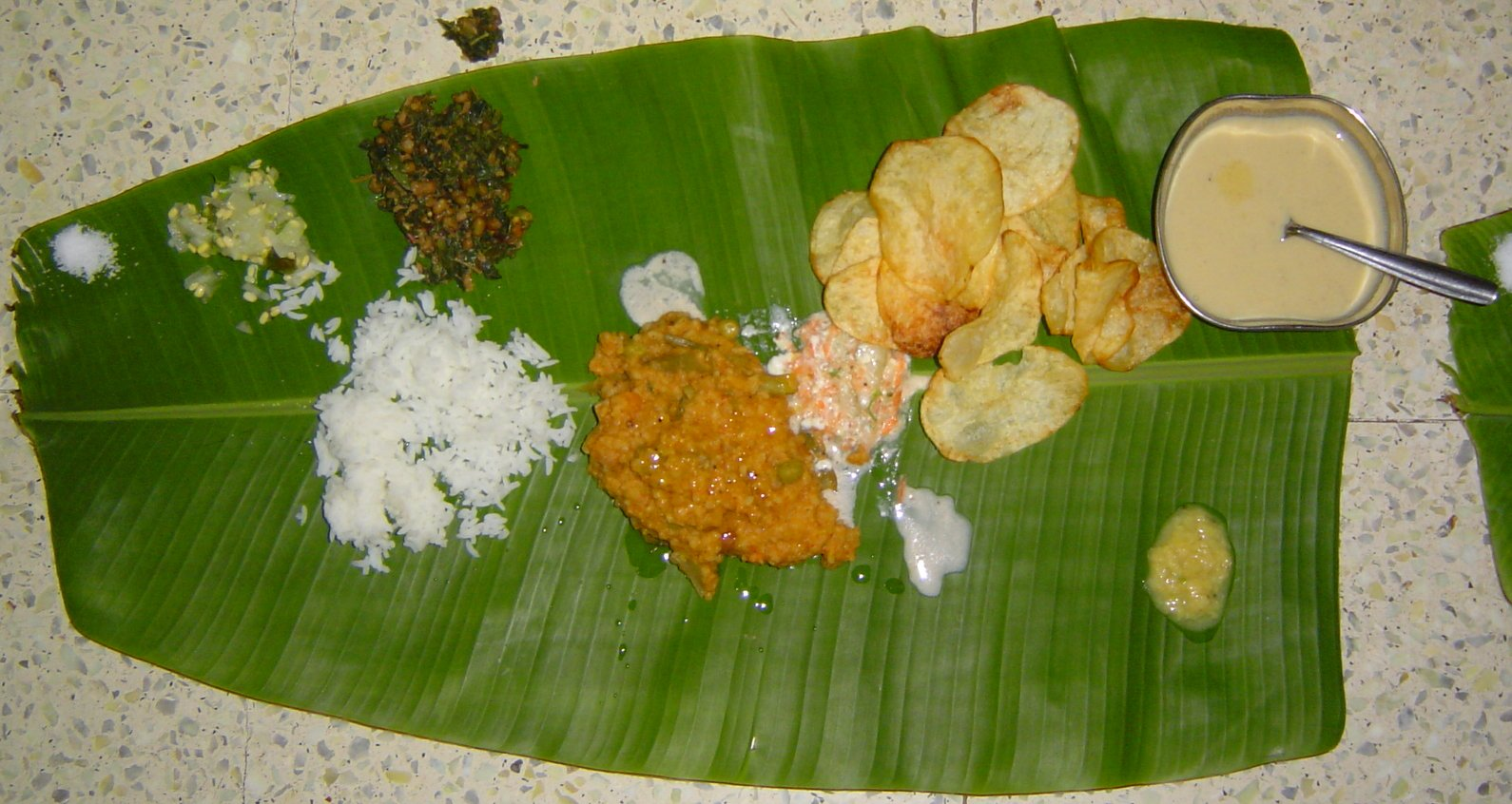
The tradition of serving meals on plantain leaves endures in South India, especially at formal events.

Food habits are diverse even regionally and are largely based on the traditions. Rice is the staple diet. Coconut is an important ingredient in Kerala and coastal part of Karnataka of South India, Hyderabadi biryani is also very special in Telangana and other neighbouring states whereas the cuisine in Andhra Pradesh is characterized by the pickles, spicy aromatic curries and the generous use of chili powder. Dosa, Idli, Uttapam etc. are popular throughout the region. Coastal areas like the state of Kerala and the city of Mangalore are known for their seafood. South Indian coffee is generally quite robust, and coffee is a preferred drink throughout the Malabar region. Tamil Nadu is well known for its Idli, Dosa, Pongal, Sambhar, Vada, Puri, which are the common breakfast in Tamil families. Among the Malayalees, Appam, Puttu, Upamav, Malabar biriyani are some of the common dishes. In Karnataka, Bisibele bath, Kara bath, Kesari bath, Raggi mudda, Udin Vada, Bene Masala Dosa, Paper Dosa are some of the common dishes.

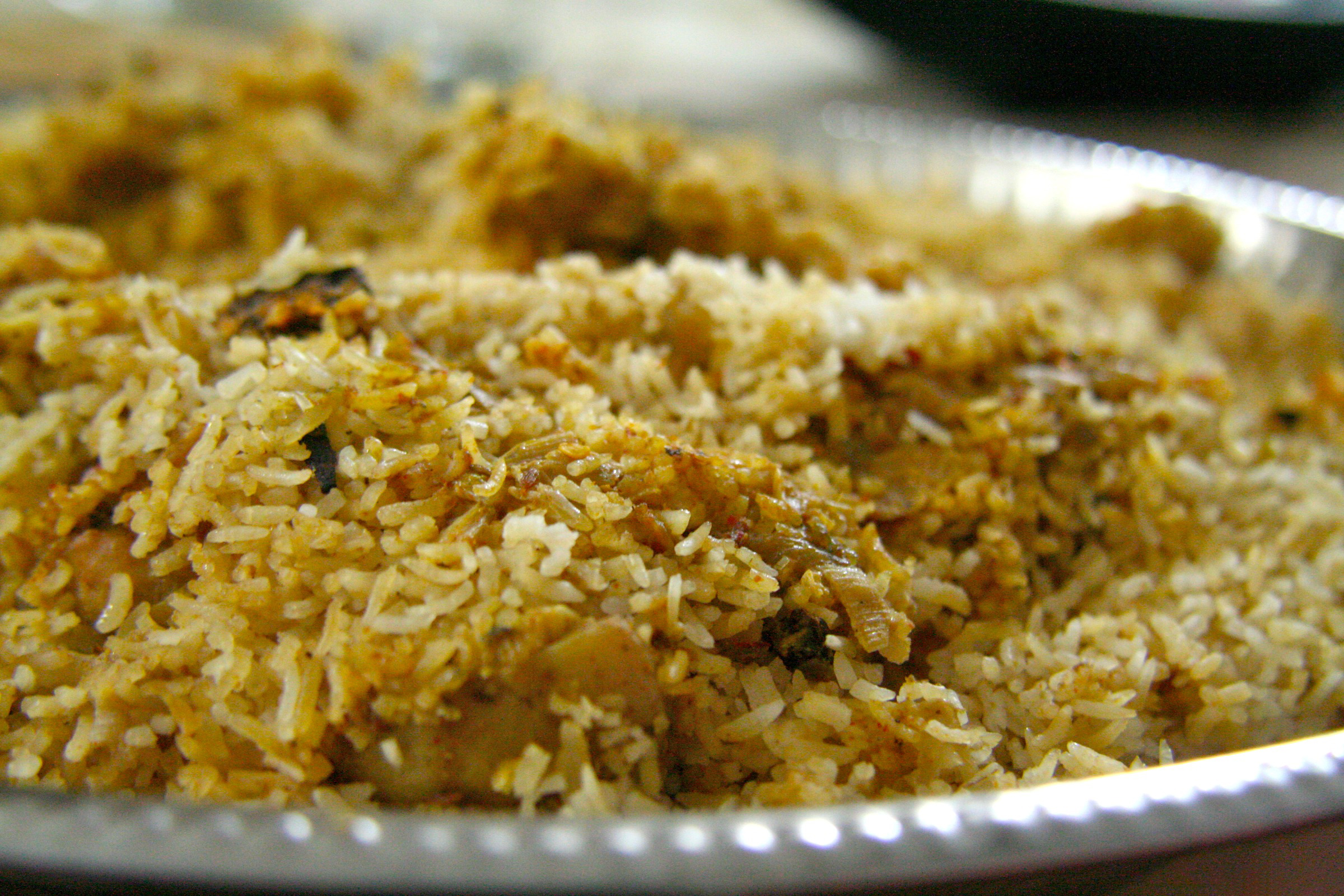
A Thalassery cuisine which makes use of Malabar spices

Coconut is native to Southern India and spread to Europe, Arabia, and Persia through the southwestern Malabar Coast of South India over the centuries. Coconut of Indian origin was brought to the Americas by Portuguese merchants. Black pepper is also native to the Malabar Coast of India, and the Malabar pepper is extensively cultivated there. During classical era, Phoenicians, Greeks, Egyptians, Romans, and Chinese were attracted by the spices including Cinnamon and Black pepper from the ancient port of Muziris in the southwestern coast of India.

During Middle Ages prior to the Age of Discovery which began with the end of the 15th century CE, the kingdom of Calicut (Kozhikode) on Malabar Coast was the centre of Indian pepper exports to the Red Sea and Europe at this time with Egyptian and Arab traders being particularly active. The Thalassery cuisine, a style of cuisine originated in the Northern Kerala over centuries, makes use of such spices

== Music ==
South Indian Dance

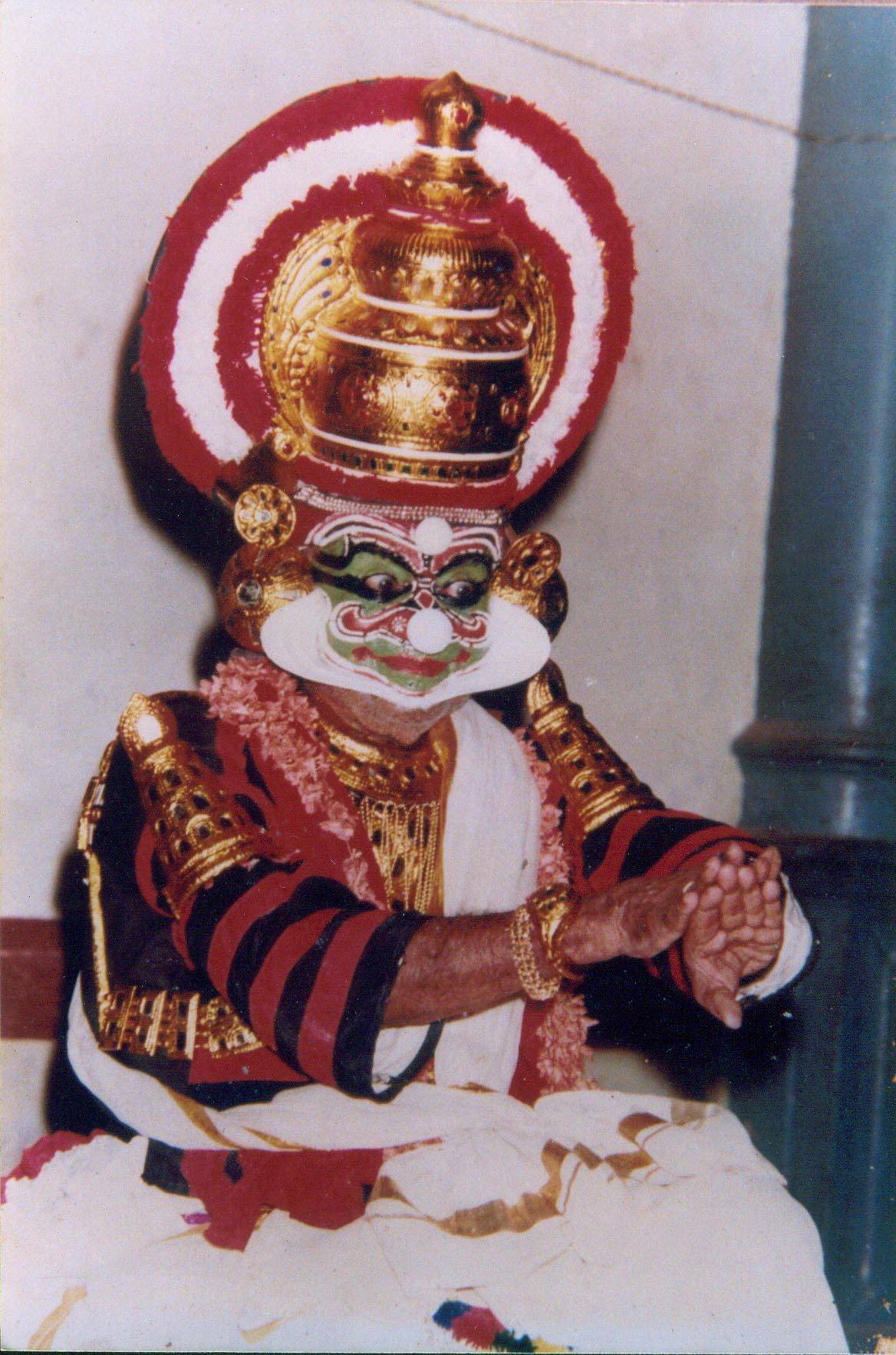
Ancient Sanskrit drama tradition Koodiyattam. Nātyāchārya Padma Shri Māni Mādhava Chākyār as Ravana.

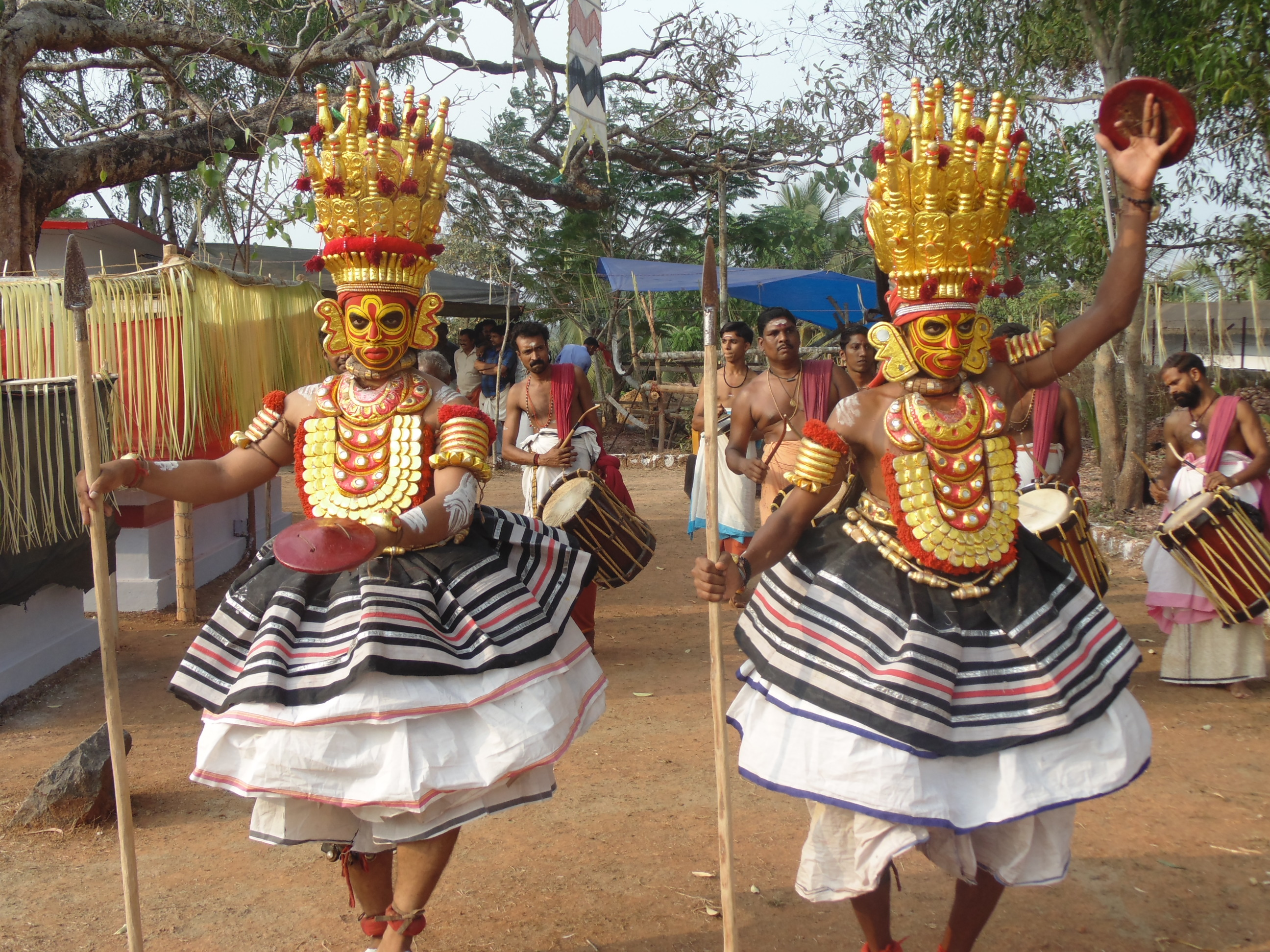
Thirayattam, an ethnic dance form of Kerala.

There is a variety of music. It ranges from rural folk music to the sophisticated Indian Classical Music of South India is known as Carnatic music (after Carnatic, the name by which south India was known in the earlier colonial days. Sarang Dev coined south Indian classical music as Karnatic Music). It includes melodious, mostly devotional, rhythmic and structured music by composers such as Purandara Dasa, Kanaka Dasaru, Tyagaraja, Dikshathar, Shyama Sasthri, and Swati Tirunal. It is difficult to discuss the culture and music of the four states of South India in a single breath. In Tamil Nadu, there is Tamil Pann, which is sung by Oduvars in Temples. They sing the works of famous Tamil Poets like Sambandar, etc. in various panns (another word for raagas).

=== Hindu Temple Music ===
The main instrument that is used in south Indian Hindu temples is the (nadaswaram) It is said to have been created when the very first temple was established in South India. The nadaswaram and the (thavil) were played together in South Indian temples to create a periya melam ensemble. Because of its harsh tone, periya melam is not favored by many Europeans, but to South India, it is a sound of pride and majesty. For many temple traditions, periya melam is necessary for worshippers to feel a spiritual presence. Periya melam is used to play for daily rituals inside the temples and annual rituals outside and around temples. Terada, Yoshitaka. "Temple Music Traditions in Hindu South India: "Periya Melam" and its Performance Practice." Asian Music 39.2 (2009): 108-51. ProQuest. Web. 24 Sep. 2013.

== Dance ==
The South Indian culture is celebrated in the elaborate dance forms of South India: Koodiyattam, Bharatanatyam, Oyilattam, Karakattam, Kuchipudi, Kathakali, Thirayattam, Theyyam, Bhuta Kola, Ottamthullal, Oppana, Kerala Natanam, Mohiniaattam and Yakshagana. Thirayattam is a Ritualistic Performing art of South Malabar region in Kerala state. The Bharatanatyam is the celebration of the eternal universe through the celebration of the beauty of the body. This is done through its tenets of having a perfectly erect posture, a straight and pout curving stomach, a well rounded and proportionate body mass to the body structure, very long hair and curvaceous hips. These tenets bring to life the philosophy of Natyashastra, 'Angikam bhuvanam yasya' (The body is your world). This is elaborated in the araimandi posture, wherein the performer assumes a half sitting position with the knees turned sideways, with a very erect posture. In this fundamental posture of the Bharatanatyam dance, the distance between the head and the navel becomes equal to that between the earth and the navel. In a similar way the distance between the outstretched right arm to the outstretched left arm becomes equal to the distance between the head and the feet, thus representing the "Natyapurusha", the embodiment of life and creation.

== Architecture and paintings ==
South Indian Architecture and paintings

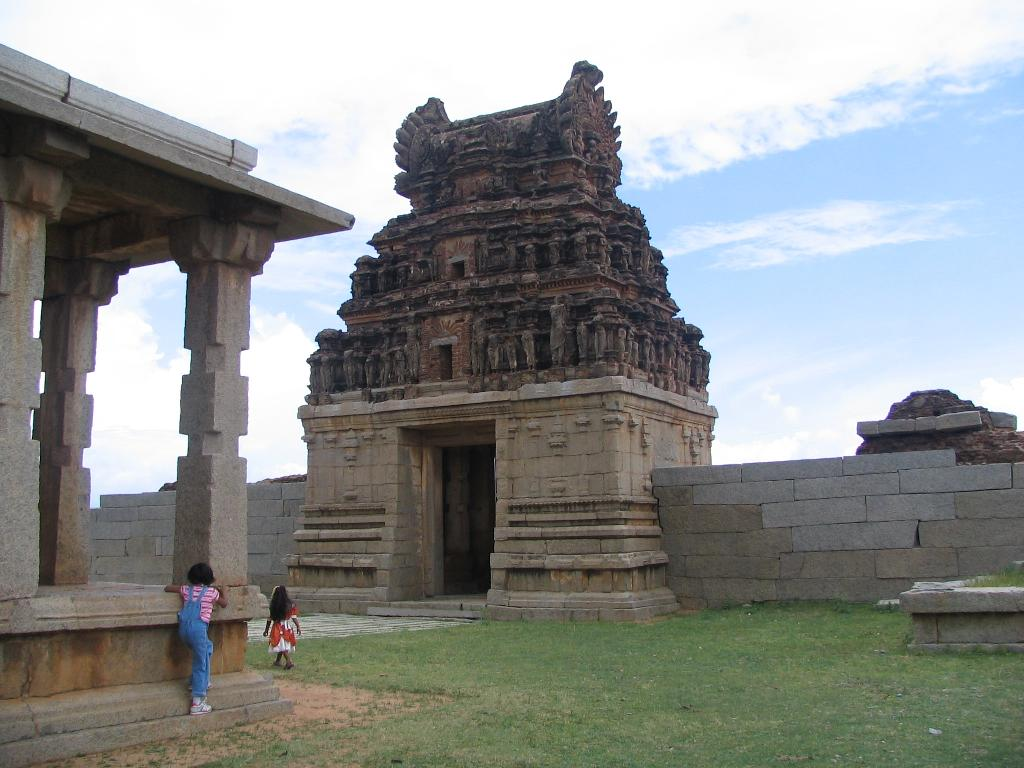
The ruins at Hampi attest to the richness of Vijayanagara architecture.

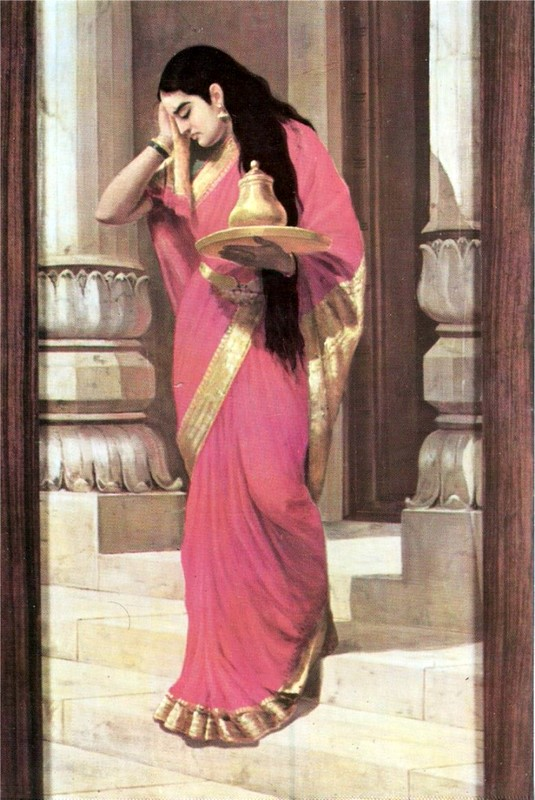
Raja Ravi Varma's paintings combined European techniques with a distinctly South Indian sensibility.

South India boasts of having two enchanting styles of rock architecture, the pure Dravida style of Tamil Nadu and the Vesara style (also called Karnata Dravida style) present in Karnataka. Other style of non-rock architecture include the Kerala Architecture. It has been performed/followed according to Indian Vedic architectural science (Vastu Shastra). The inspirational temple sculptures of Mahabalipuram, Tanjore, Hampi, Badami, Pattadakal, Aihole, Belur, Halebidu, Lakkundi, Shravanabelagola, Madurai and the mural paintings of Travancore and Lepakshi temples, also stand as a testament to South Indian culture. The paintings of Raja Ravi Varma are considered classic renditions of many themes of South Indian life and mythology. There are several examples of Kerala Mural paintings in the Mattancherry Palace and the Shiva kshetram at Ettamanoor. South India is home, as of April 2006, to 5 of the 26 World Heritage-listed sites in India.

== Sculptures and figurine ==
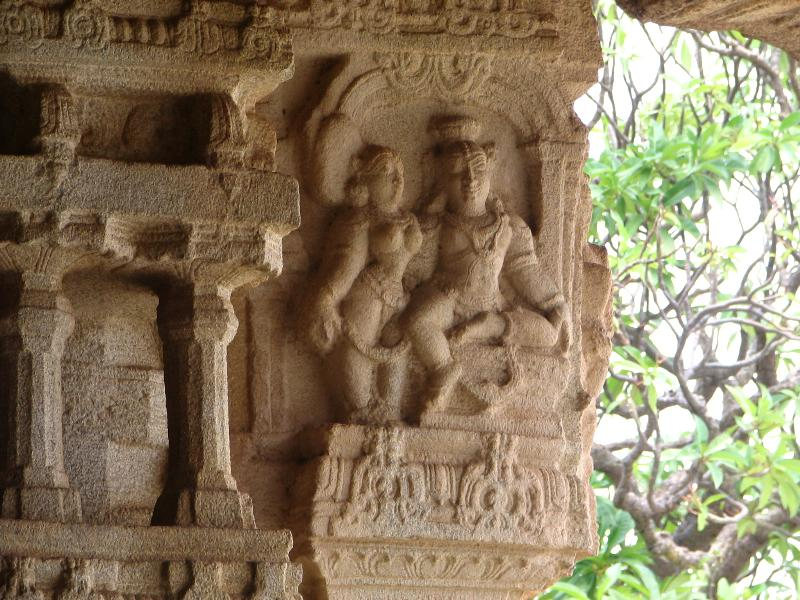
Sculptures at Hampi embodying human expression, Karnataka.

Sculptures became one of the finest medium of South Indian expression after the human form of dance. In this medium it was possible to etch the three-dimensional form in time. The traditional South Indian sculptor starts his sculpture of the divinities from the navel which is always represented unclothed by the sari. A koshta or grid of the sculpture would show the navel to be right at the centre of the sculpture, representing the source of the union of the finite body and the infinite universe. Sculptures adorn many of the temples around the complexes and also inside them. They are also depiction of dance steps of various stylizations and have served to preserve dance forms and revive it.

== Literature and philosophy ==
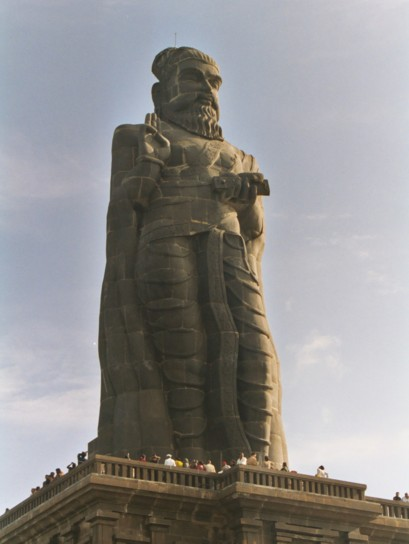
Tiruvalluvar, the author of the Tirukkural.

South India has one of the oldest literary traditions in the world reaching back over two thousand years. The first known literature of South India are the poetic Sangams, which were written in Tamil around two to one and a half thousand years ago. The Kannada classic Kavirajamarga, written in 850 CE by King Amoghavarsha I, makes references to Kannada literature of King Durvinita in early sixth century CE. Tamil Buddhist commentators of the tenth century CE, Nemrinatham makes references to Kannada literature of fourth century CE. Distinct Malayalam and Telugu literary traditions developed in the following centuries. The artistic expressions of the South Indian people show their admiration of the magnificence of nature and its rhythms. Some of the works include Silappadhikaram by Ilango Adigal, Tholkappiam written by Tholkappiar, Thiruvalluvar's Thirukural, Kumaravyasa's Karnata Bharata Katamanjari, Pampa's Vikramarjuna Vijaya, Andhra Maha Bharatamu by the three poets namely Nannaya, Tikkana and Errana, Shiva Sharana by Basavanna and Akka Mahadevi's Vachanas. In South Indian literature and philosophy, women are considered very powerful. A married woman is regarded as auspicious, her shakti or feminine power, protects and empowers her husband and their children. Contemporary Kannada writers have received eight Jnanapith awards which is the highest for any Indian language and Malayalam literature has been presented with 6 Jnanpith awards, which lies second only to Kannada literature.

== Communities and traditions ==
The main spiritual traditions of South India include both Shaivite and Vaishnavite branches of Hinduism, although Buddhist and Jain philosophies had been influential several centuries earlier (recent studies suggest at least the Shaivite branch of Hinduism was present in Southern India before the arrival of Buddhism and Jainism as Ellalan a Tamil King who invaded Sri Lanka in the year 205 BCE is identified by Sinhalese Buddhists as a Shaivite). South Indian Spiritual traditions have also been informed by Pre-Aryan Indigenous nature and polytheistic worship that distinguishes it from other regions in India. Shravanabelagola in Karnataka is a popular pilgrimage center for Jains. Christianity has flourished in coastal South India from the times of St. Thomas the Apostle who came to Kerala in 52 AD and established the Syrian Christian tradition today called Saint Thomas Christians or Nasranis. There is a large Muslim community in South India, particularly in the Malabar Coast, which can trace its roots to the ancient maritime trade between Kerala and Omanis and other Arabs, mainly from Hadhramaut and adjoining South Arabian regions. They are known as Mappila Muslims and are scattered mainly around the regions of North Malabar and South Malabar in Kerala, along with the inhabited islands of Lakshadweep in the Arabian Sea. According to some scholars, the Mappilas are the oldest settled native Muslim community in South Asia. Madras and Cochin are homes to one of the oldest Cochin Jews and Paradesi Jews in the world who are supposed to have arrived in the Malabar coast during the time of King Solomon. The oldest surviving Jewish synagogue in the Commonwealth of Nations is the Kadavumbhagam Synagogue and the Paradesi Synagogue in Kochi, Kerala.

== See also ==
- Culture of India
- Culture of Tamil Nadu
- Arts of Kerala
- Culture of Andhra Pradesh
- Culture of Kerala
- Culture of Karnataka
- Culture of Telangana
- Etiquette of Indian dining

== References and bibliography ==
- Beck, Brenda. 1976. "The Symbolic Merger of Body, Space, and Cosmos in Hindu Tamil Nadu." Contributions to Indian Sociology 10(2): 213–43.
- Bharata (1967). The Natyashastra [Dramaturgy], 2 vols., 2nd. ed. Trans. by Manomohan Ghosh. Calcutta: Manisha Granthalaya.
- Boulanger, Chantal; (1997) Saris: An Illustrated Guide to the Indian Art of Draping, Shakti Press International, New York. ISBN 0-9661496-1-0
- Craddock, Norma. 1994. Anthills, Split Mothers, and Sacrifice: Conceptions of Female Power in the Mariyamman Tradition. Dissertation, U. of California, Berkeley.
- Danielou, Alain, trans. 1965. Shilappadikaram (The Ankle Bracelet) By Prince Ilango Adigal. New York: New Directions. ISBN 0-8112-0001-9
- Dehejia, Vidya, Richard H. Davis, R. Nagaswamy, Karen Pechilis Prentiss (2002) The Sensuous and the Sacred: Chola Bronzes from South India. ISBN 0-295-98284-5
- Hart, George, ed. and trans. 1979. Poets of the Tamil Anthologies: Ancient Poems of Love and War. Princeton: Princeton U. Press
- Kallarasa Virachita Janavasya Ed: G.G. Manjunathan. Kannada Adhyayana Samsthe, University of Mysore, Mysore 1974.
- Gover, Charles. 1983 (1871). Folk-songs of Southern India. Madras: The South India Saiva Siddhanta Works Publishing Society.
- Nagaraju, S. 1990. "Prehistory of South India." In South Indian Studies, H. M. Nayak and B. R. Gopal, eds., Mysore: Geetha Book House, pp. 35–52.
- Trawick, Margaret. 1990a. Notes on Love in a Tamil Family. Berkeley: U. of California Press.
- Wadley, Susan, ed. 1980. The Powers of Tamil Women. Syracuse: Syracuse U. Press.
- Zvelebil, Kamil. 1975. Tamil Literature. Leiden: Brill. ISBN 90-04-04190-7
- Caldwell, R (1998) "A comparative grammar of the Dravidian or South-Indian family of languages" 3rd ed. rev. and edited by J.L. Wyatt, T. Ramakrishna Pillai. New Delhi : Asian Educational Services. ISBN 81-206-0117-3
