= Vallathol Narayana Menon =

Indian poet (1878–1958)

Mahakavi Vallathol Narayana Menon
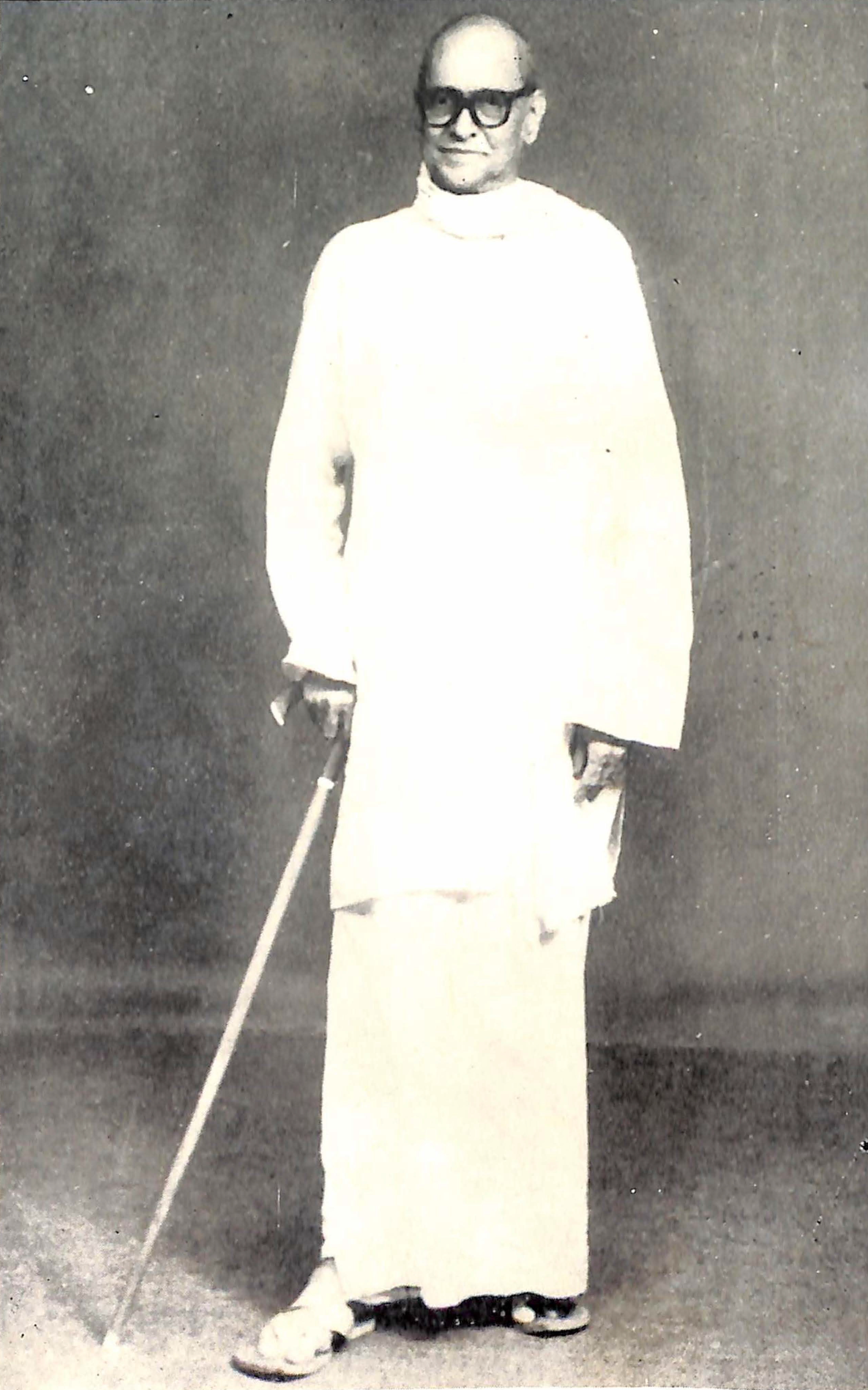
- Born: 16 October 1878; Mangalam, Tirur, Malabar District, Madras Presidency, British India (Present day Malappuram district, Kerala, India)
- Died: 13 March 1958 (aged 79)
- Occupations: Malayalam Poet, translator
- Known for: Poetry, Indian independence activism, social reform, revival of Kathakali
- Awards: Padma Bhushan (1954)

Vallathol Narayana Menon (16 October 1878 – 13 March 1958) was a Malayalam poet and one of the triumvirate of modern Malayalam poetry, along with Asan and Ulloor. The honorific Mahakavi was applied to him in 1913 after the publication of his Mahakavya Chitrayogam. He was a nationalist poet and wrote a series of poems on various aspects of the Indian freedom movement. He founded the Kerala Kalamandalam and is credited with revitalising the traditional Keralite dance form known as Kathakali.

== Early life ==
Vallathol was born in Chennara, Mangalam, Tirur, in Malappuram District, Kerala, as the son of Kadungotte Mallisseri Damodaran Elayathu and Kuttipparu Amma(Parvathy). He did not receive any formal education but was trained in Sanskrit language, first under the Sanskrit scholar Variyam Parambil Kunjan Nair(real name not known)and then under his own uncle Ramanunni Menon, who introduced him into the world of Sanskrit poetry. Ramanunni Menon also taught him Ashtanga Hridayam, a medical treatise, and young Narayana Menon soon began helping his uncle in medical practice and teaching. He also trained for a year under Parakkulam Subrahmanya Sastri and Kaikulangara Rama Variar in Philosophy and Logic. He married Vanneri Chittazhiveettil Madhavi Amma in November 1901 and shifted to Thrissur, the cultural capital of Kerala. He worked as manager in the Kalpadrumam Press in Thrissur from 1905 to 1910. During this period, his hearing began to deteriorate. From 1915, he started working in Keralodayam newspaper and later joined Amrit Ritesh, a journal published from Thrissur.

== Poetry ==
He started writing poems from the age of twelve. Kiratha Satakam and Vyasavataram were his earliest published works. He won Bhashaposhini magazine's poetry award in 1894. His poems began appearing in Bhashaposhini, Kerala Sanchari and Vijnana Chintamani magazines. His first major literary ventures was a rendition of Valmiki's Ramayana into Malayalam, the work of which started in 1905 and took two years to complete. Unlike some of his contemporaries, Vallathol did not have any acquaintance with English language. He earned the title Mahakavi after the publication of the Mahakavya Chitrayogam in 1913. Chitrayogam conformed to all the principles of a traditional Mahakavya and was divided into 18 Sargas. The story of Chandrasena and Taravali, taken from Kathasaritsagara, was the theme of this poetry work. Vallathol portrayed the protest of Parvati against Siva in the work Gangapati (1913) and of Usha defying her father for the sake of her love in Bandhanasthanaya Anirudhan (1914). In 1917, the first of his eleven-volume work Sahitya Manjari (A Bouquet of Literature) was published. These volumes, published from 1917 to 1970, contain his collected short romantic poems dealing with a variety of themes. Many of these poems earlier appeared in P. V. Krishna Variar's Kavanakaumudi magazine. His khanda kavya on Mary Magdalene titled Magdalana Mariam paved the way for a new tradition in of Christian symbolism in Malayalam. The poet's own struggle with deafness from his early twenties features in the work Badhiravilapam. Other celebrated short poems of Vallathol include Sishyanum Makanum, Virasinkala, Achanum Makalum, Divaswapnam, and Ente Gurukulam.

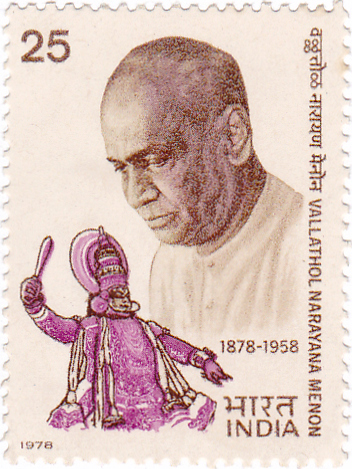
A 1978 commemorative stamp of India in honour of Vallathol

In addition to subjects from nature and the lives of ordinary people, Vallathol's opposition to the indignities of the caste system and the injustices suffered by the poor are common themes for many of his poems. He is also regarded as the greatest nationalist poet of the language. He was one of the triumvirate poets of modern Malayalam, along with Kumaran Asan and Ulloor S. Parameswara Iyer. Literary critic K. M. George has noted that, together with Kumaran Asan, Vallathol was "responsible for bringing about a revolutionary change in Malayalam poetry in the [nineteen]-twenties. Asan concentrated on social themes and Vallathol championed the national movement; yet both made very significant contributions to the khandkavya, ie: the short poem of the lyrical type."

The title "Kavisarvabhowman" was conferred upon him by the Maharaja of Cochin. He was awarded Padma Bhushan title, India's third highest civilian award, in 1954.

== Kathakali ==
Vallathol is credited with revitalising Kathakali. He played a prominent role in setting up the Kerala Kalamandalam at Cheruthuruthy, near the banks of Bharathapuzha River. The revival of the art of Kathakali in modern Kerala was mainly due to the efforts of Vallathol and the Kerala Kalamandalam. He stimulated the world's interest in this art during his tours abroad between 1950 and 1953.

== Involvement in Nationalist movement ==
Vallathol was a nationalist writing in the Malayalam language. He actively participated in the Nationalist movement. He attended the all India Conferences of the Indian Congress in 1922 and 1927 and rejected a royal honour bestowed upon him by the Prince of Wales during his India visit in 1922. Vallathol remained a great admirer of Mahatma Gandhi and wrote the poem "Ente Gurunathan" ("My Great Teacher") in his praise. At the same time, he felt attracted by the Communist ideology and wrote poems praising the achievements of the Soviet Union. He wrote several patriotic poems hailing India's nationalist movement.

== Bibliography ==
The following is a list of works published by Vallathol Narayana Menon. The bibliographical details of subsequent editions are used wherever the details of the first edition are not available. Kerala University published a bibliography of the author in 1978 titled Vallathol Bibliography.

=== Poetry ===
| Year | Title | Publisher | Notes |
|---|---|---|---|
| c. 1896 | Vyasavatharam | (Periodical) | Manipravalam poetry |
| c. 1896 | Kirathashathakam | (Periodical) | Manipravalam poetry |
| 1896 | Sallapapuram | Pattambi: Vijnana Chitamani | First work published as a book; collection of 40 Manipravalam verses co-authored with Vellanassery Vasudevan Moossath; written under the name Kozhiparambil Narayana Menon; published by A. Raman Moossath |
| 1899 | Rithuvilasam | Kavanodayam | An imitation of Kalidasa's Ritusamhaara; 2nd edition of the book published by Vidya Vilasom, Calicut in 1922 |
| c. 1901 | Parvati Padadi Kesanta Stavam | — | Written for Parishkarabhivardini Nadaka Sabha |
| 1906 | Tapati Samvaranam | Rasikaranjini | Vanjipattu; Published in the 1906 July–August (ME 1081 Karkhidakam-Chingam) edition of Rasikaranjini; never published as a book |
| c. 1910 | Badhiravilapam | Kottakkal: Lakshmi Sahayam (2nd edition) | 1st edition in c. 1910; 2nd edition in 1917; 3rd edition by K. Vasudevan Moossath in 1920 printed at Mangalodayam, Trichur |
| 1913 | Ganapathy | Kunnamkulam: A. R. P. (2nd edition) | originally published in Kavanna Kaumudi in 1913; published as a book with an introduction by P. V. Krishnan Nair; 2nd edition published in 1920 |
| 1914 | Bandhanasthanaya Anirudhan | Kunnamkulam: A. R. P. | Originally published in Athmaposhini in c. 1913 |
| 1914 | Chitrayogam | Kottakkal: Lakshmi Sahayam | Manipravalam poetry |
| 1915 | Oushadhaharanam | Trichur: Mangalodayam | Kathakali aattakatha |
| 1916 | Vilasa Lathika | Trichur: Mangalodayam | With an introduction by Koyippilli Paramesvara Kurup |
| 1917 | Oru Kathu athava Rugmiyude Paschathapam | Kunnamkulam: A. R. P. | Originally published in the March–April 1914 (ME 1089 Meenam) edition of Kavanakaumudi |
| 1917 | Rakshasakrithyam Kilippattu | Trivandrum: S. V. | |
| 1918 | Sahitya Manjari Vol. 1 | Kunnamkulam: A. R. P. | 14 poems |
| 1919 | Randaksharam | Trivandrum: Saraswathi Vilasom | Khanda kavya |
| 1919 | Sishyanum Makanum | Kunnamkulam: A. R. P. | With an introduction by K. M. Panikkar in English |
| 1920 | Sahitya Manjari Vol. 2 | Kunnamkulam: A. R. P. | 12 poems; with an introduction by Kuttipuzha Krishna Pillai |
| 1921 | Magdalana Mariyam athava Paschathapam Prayashcitham | — | |
| 1922 | Sahitya Manjari Vol. 3 | Trichur: Vidya Vinodini | With an introduction by P. Sankaran Nambiar in English |
| 1926 | Sahitya Manjari Vol. 5 | Trichur: Mangalodayam | |
| 1928 | Vishukkani | Cheruthuruthi: Vallathol Granthalayam (3rd edition) | First edition in 1928; 3rd edition in 1941; 10 poems |
| 1929 | Kochu Seetha | Trichur: Mangalodayam | With notes by Kuttikrishna Marar |
| 1931 | Kavyamritham | Quilon: Sreerama Vilasom | 2nd edition; 17 poems |
| 1932 | Kairali Kadaksham Vol.1, Vol. 2, Vol. 3 | Trivandrum: V. V. Pub. House | Short poems for children |
| 1934 | Sahitya Manjari Vol. 6 | Trivandrum: B. V. | 3rd edition; 15 poems |
| 1935 | Sahitya Manjari Vol. 7 | Cheruthuruthi: Vallathol Granthalayam | 19 poems |
| 1935 | Veera Sringala | Trichur: Sundarayyar & Sons | |
| 1936 | Achanum Makalum | Cheruthuruthi: Mangalodayam | With an introduction by C. S. Nair |
| 1936 | Kairali Kandhalam | Trichur: Sundarayyar & Sons | 14 poems |
| 1942 | Saranam Ayyappa | Cheruthuruthi: Vallathol Granthalayam | |
| 1943 | Indiayude Karachil | Palghat: Vellinezhi | With an introduction by T. C. Narayanan Nambiar |
| 1944 | Divaswapnam | Calicut: P. C. Brothers | 10 poems |
| 1944 | Ente Gurunathan | Palghat: Vellinezhi | With an introduction by O. M. C. Narayanan Nambudiripad |
| 1944 | Sahitya Manjari Vol. 4 | Cheruthuruthi: Vallathol Granthalayam | 6th edition; 13 poems; With an introduction by Kuttikrishna Marar |
| 1944 | Sthree | Cheruthuruthi: Vallathol Granthalayam | 7 poems; with an introduction by E. M. S. Namboodiripad |
| 1948 | Prakrithiyude Manorajyam | Alleppey: Vidyarambam | Prakrithiyude Manorajyam and Ulloor's Akkare Pacha combined in a volume titled Randu Tharangal |
| 1949 | Komala Sisukkal | Trivandrum: Balan | With an introduction by Mathew M. Kuzhiveli |
| 1949 | Padmadalam | Trivandrum: Kamalalaya | 15 poems |
| 1950 | Sahitya Manjari Vol. 8 | Cheruthuruthi: Vallathol Granthalayam | 12 poems |
| 1950 | Onapudava | Cheruthuruthi: Vallathol Granthalayam | 3rd edition; 14 poems |
| 1951 | Bappuji | Cheruthuruthi: Vallathol Granthalayam | With annotations by Ullattil Govindankutty Nair |
| 1951 | Russiayil | Cheruthuruthi: Vallathol Granthalayam | 5 poems; with annotations; based on the 1951 journey to Russia |
| 1956 | Abhivadyam | Cheruthuruthi: Vallathol Granthalayam | With annotations; 9 poems |
| 1959 | Sahitya Manjari Vol. 9 | Cheruthuruthi: Vallathol Granthalayam | 17 poems with annotations; published posthumously |
| 1960 | Dandakaranyam | Cheruthuruthi: Vallathol Granthalayam | Originally published in 1910 in Kavanakaumudi; with annotations |
| 1962 | Bhagaval Sthothramala | Cheruthuruthi: Mangalodayam | 2nd edition; With an introduction by E. V. Raman Namboothiri |
| 1962 | Nagila | Cheruthuruthi: Vallathol Granthalayam | With an introduction by P. Damodaran Pillai |
| 1962 | Vallathol Sudha Vol.1, Vol.2 | Cheruthuruthi: Vallathol Granthalayam | Collection of poems in two volumes; compiled by Kuttipuzha Krishna Pillai |
| 1964 | Sahitya Manjari Vol. 10 | Cheruthuruthi: Vallathol Granthalayam | 17 poems; published posthumously |
| 1965 | Khanda Krithikal | Cheruthuruthi: Vallathol Granthalayam | 12th edition; With an introduction by P. V. Krishna Warrier; Collection of 15 works |
| 1968 | Allah | Cheruthuruthi: Vallathol Granthalayam | With an introduction by T. Ubaid; and a note by C. H. Mohammed Koya |
| 1970 | Sahitya Manjari Vol. 11 | Cheruthuruthi: Vallathol Granthalayam | 25 poems; published posthumously; with an introduction by C. Govinda Kurup |
| 1975 | Vallatholinte Padyakrithikal Vol. 1 | Kottayam: S.P.C.S. | With a biographical note by C. P. Sreedharan and an introduction by E. V. Raman Namboodiri |
| 1975 | Vallatholinte Padyakrithikal Vol. 2 | Kottayam: S.P.C.S. | With an introduction by N. V. Krishna Warrier |
| 1988 | Vallatholinte Khanda Kavyangal | Calicut: Mathrubhumi | |
| 1994 | Kavya Manjusha | Calicut: Poorna | Collection of 10 poems and a study on Kochu Seetha; with an introduction by S. K. Vasanthan |
| — | Triyamam | — | Manipravalam work co-authored with Vellanassery Vasudevan Moossath; probably lost work |
| — | Keechaka Vadham | — | Kaikottikalippattu; probably lost book |
| — | India Chakravarthi Yogakshema Kummippaattu | — | Co-authored with Manavikraman Ettan Raja and Oduvil Kunhikrishna Menon |
| — | Paralokam | Palghat: Vellnezhi | With annotations |

=== Translations ===
| Year | Title | Publisher | Notes |
|---|---|---|---|
| 1906 | Panchatantram | Trichur: Kerala Chintamani | Translation of Panchatantra in Manipravalam; with an introduction by Oduvil Kunhikrishna Menon; Originally written in 1901 for Parishkarabhivardini Nadaka Sabha |
| 1909 | Sri Valmiki Ramayanam | Trichur: Kerala Kalpadrumam | Translation of Valmiki Ramayana; with an introduction by Appan Thampuran in Malayalam and Kerala Varma Valiya Koil Thampuran in English; later editions in seven volumes: Bala Kaanda, Ayodhya Kaanda, Aranya Kaanda, Kishkindhaa Kaanda, Sundara Kaanda, Yuddha Kaanda, Uttara Kaanda |
| 1910 | Unmatta Raghavam | Trichur: Kerala Kalpadrumam | Translation of Bhaskara's Unmatta Rāghava |
| 1917 | Markandeya Puranam | Edapally: Kurumoor Narayanan Battathirippad | Translation of Markandeya Purana |
| 1919 | Urubhangam | — | Translation of Bhāsa's Urubhanga |
| 1920 | Madhyamavyayogam | Calicut: P. Vasudevan Namboothiri | Translation of Bhāsa's Madhyamavyayoga; with an introduction by P. V. Krishna Warrier |
| 1921 | Bhadravatharam Pana | Trivandrum: B. V. | |
| 1922 | Abhisheka Natakam | — | Translation of Bhāsa's Abhishekanataka |
| 1922 | Pancharathram | Kunnamkulam: A. R. P. | Translation of Bhāsa's Panchratra; with introductions by Pallathu Raman and Nalapat Narayana Menon |
| 1923 | Vamana Puranam | Trivandrum: B. V. | Translation of Vamana Purana; with an introduction by M. Ramavarma Thampuran |
| 1924 | Purana Kavya Manjari Vol. 1 | Ottappalam: Kamalalaya | Published by V. N. Nair; translation of Sanskrit poems |
| 1925 | Svapnavasavadattam | Trichur: Mangalodayam | Translation of Bhāsa's Svapnavasavadattam; originally published in Sadguru monthly magazine |
| 1926 | Padma Mahapuranam Vol. 1, Vol. 2, Vol. 3 | Trivandrum: B. V. | Translation of Padma Purana in three volumes |
| 1926 | Purana Kavya Manjari Vol. 2 | Ottappalam: Kamalalaya | Published by V. N. Nair; translation of Sanskrit poems |
| 1926 | Purana Manjari | Trivandrum: Kamalalaya | Compilation of ancient poems |
| 1926 | Matsya Mahapuranam | Trivandrum: B. V. Book Depot | Translation of Matsya Purana |
| 1936 | Abhijnana Shakuntalam | Calicut: Mathrubhumi | Translation of Kalidasa's Abhijnana Shakuntala; with annotations by Kuttikrishna Marar |
| 1937 | Purana Kavya Manjari | Trichur: B. V. | Translation of 41 ancient poems by various authors; published by K. R. G. Menon; with an introduction by V. Unnikrishnan Nair |
| 1945 | Kapata Keli | Trichur: Mangalodayam | Translation of Vatsarāja's Hasyacudamani |
| 1946 | Karpuracharita Bhanam | Trichur: Mangalodayam | Translation of Vatsarāja's Karpuracarita Bhana |
| 1948 | Tripura Dahanam | Cheruthuruthi: Vallathol Granthalayam | Translation of Vatsarāja's Tripuradahana; with an introduction by C. Kunhan Raja |
| 1948 | Rugminiharanam | Cheruthuruthi: Vallathol Granthalayam | Translation of Vatsarāja's Rukmiṇīharaṇa; with an introduction by P. S. Ananthanarayana Sastry |
| 1951 | Bodhisattva Apadana Kalpalata | Trivandrum: Travancore University | Translation of Kshemendra's works in four volumes; with an introduction by E. V. Raman Namboothiri |
| 1952 | Gramasoubhagyam | Cheruthuruthi: Vallathol Granthalayam | Translation of Hāla's Gāthā Saptaśatī (700 poems); with an introduction by E. V. Raman Namboothiri |
| 1955 | Rigveda Samhita Vol. 1 | Cheruthuruthi: Vallathol Granthalayam | Translation of Mandala 1 of Rigveda |
| 1956 | Rigveda Samhita Vol. 2 | Cheruthuruthi: Vallathol Granthalayam | Translation of Mandalas 2, 3, 4 and 5 of Rigveda |
| 1957 | Rigveda Samhita Vol. 3 | Cheruthuruthi: Vallathol Granthalayam | Translation of Mandalas 6, 7 and 8 of Rigveda |
| 1958 | Rigveda Samhita Vol. 4 | Cheruthuruthi: Vallathol Granthalayam | Translation of Mandalas 9 and 10 of Rigveda |
| 1978 | Samskrita Nataka Tharjamakal | Cheruthuruthi: Vallathol Granthalayam | Collection of 10 Sanskrit plays: Svapnavasavadattam, Panchratra, Urubhanga, Madhyamavyayoga (Bhāsa); Abhijnana Shakuntala (Kalidasa); Hasyacudamani, Karpuracarita Bhana, Rukmiṇīharaṇa, Tripuradahana (Vatsarāja); Unmatta Rāghava (Bhaskara) |
| 1981 | Mathangaleela | Cheruthuruthi: Vallathol Granthalayam | Translation of Matanga Lila; written in 1904 for Kadalai Manaykkal Namboothiri; first published in 1981 |
| — | Portia Vivaham | — | Play; translation of a story from Merchant of Venice; probably lost book |

=== Others ===
| Year | Title | Publisher | Notes |
|---|---|---|---|
| 1904 | Arogya Chinthamani | — | Health; Health; based on Kaikulangara Rama Warrier's Arogya Kalpadrumam; 2nd edition published by Yogakshemam, Trichur in 1926 |
| 1928 | Grantha Viharam | Trichur: Mangalodayam | Literary criticism; collection of 44 articles published in Keralodayam and Atma Poshini; compiled by Kuttikrishna Marar |
| 1964 | Prasangavediyil | Cheruthuruthi: Vallathol Granthalayam | Collection of 12 speeches |
| 1978 | Vallathol Kathukal | Kottayam: DC Books | Letters to K. M. Panikkar; compiled by Kavalam Narayana Panicker |
| 1986 | Vallatholinte Grantha Nirupanangalum Prasangangalum | Calicut: Mathrubhumi | Collected speeches and articles from the books Grantha Viharam (1928) and Prasangavediyil (1964); with an introduction by Kuttikrishna Marar |
| — | Arjuna Vijayam | — | Sanskrit play; probably lost book |
| — | Garbha Chikitsakramam | — | Health |

== See also ==
- Vallathol Award
