= Pongumoodu =

Pongumoodu Pongumoodu
- town
- Interactive map of Pongumoodu
- Coordinates: 8.539170°N 76.918851°E
- Country: India
- State: Kerala
- District: Thiruvananthapuram

Languages
  - Official: Malayalam, English
- Time zone: UTC+5:30 (IST)
- Vehicle registration: KL-

Pongumoodu (or Pongummoodu) is a small suburb of Thiruvananthapuram, the state capital of Kerala, India. It originally began as a junction on the Kollam-Trivandrum National Highway and has since become a suburban area of the capital.

It is situated directly between major hubs like Sreekaryam, Ulloor, and Kesavadasapuram.

In 2023, a local leader in the Communist Party of India from Pongumoodu was attacked with acid by another party leader.

== See also ==
- Ulloor
