= Njattupattu =

Folk song in Kerala

Njattupattu are the folk songs in Kerala, India which are sung during the time of paddy seedling. It is mainly sung by women to the rhythm of seedling.

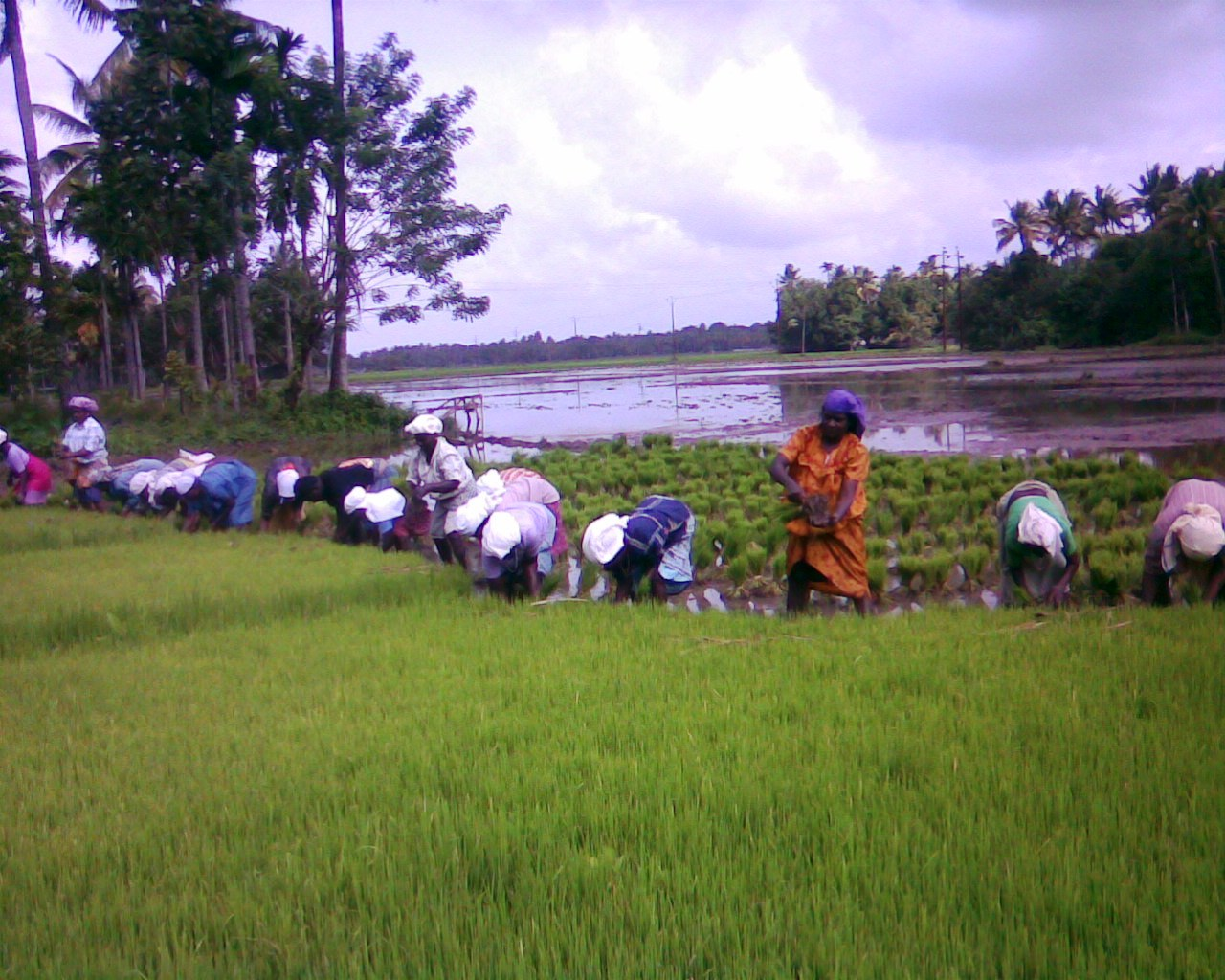
Paddy cultivation in Kerala

It is considered beneficial for effortless work, enthusiasm and cheerfulness. Vigor and wealth are often the main ideas in the songs. These folk songs are a part of Kerala culture and are passed down orally from one tongue to another from generation to generation.
