= Ulloor =

- City
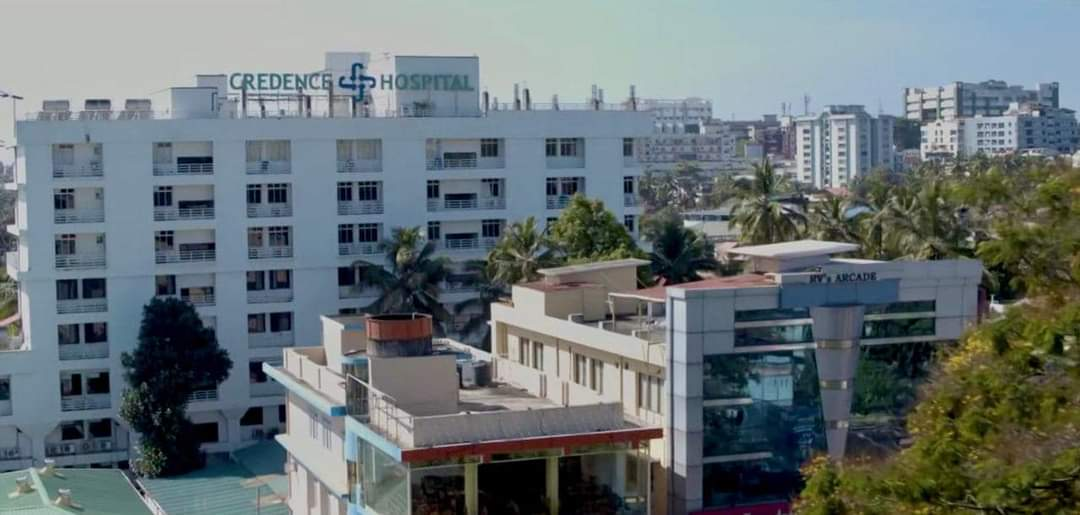

- Location in Kerala, India
- Coordinates: 8°32′3″N 76°55′46″E
- Country: India
- State: Kerala
- District: Thiruvananthapuram

Government
  - MLA: Kadakampally Surendran

Languages
  - Official: Malayalam, English
- Time zone: UTC+5:30 (IST)
- PIN: 695011
- Telephone code: +91 471-XXXXXXX
- Vehicle registration: KL-22, KL-01
- Nearest city: Thiruvananthapuram
- Lok Sabha constituency: Thiruvananthapuram
- Legislative assembly: Kazhakkoottam

Ulloor is a city locality in the Thiruvananthapuram, Kerala, India. It was the home of the modern Malayalam triumvirate poet Ulloor S. Parameswara Iyer. The Government Medical College, Thiruvananthapuram and Credence Hospital Thiruvananthapuram, Sree Uthram Thirunal Royal Hospital are located at Ulloor. Ulloor comes under Cheruvaikkal village limits of Thiruvananthapuram taluk. It comes under Kazhakootam legislative assembly constituency and Thiruvananthapuram Lok Sabha constituency. Among the devotional buildings in Ulloor are Ulloor Balasubrahmanya Swamy temple, St. Mary's Church and St. Alphonsa Church.

== Notable people ==
- Ulloor S. Parameswara Iyer
