= Kuttipuzha Krishna Pillai =

Indian scholar, journalist, philosopher (1900–1971)

- Born: 1 August 1900; Kuttipuzha, Paravur, Ernakulam, Kerala, India
- Died: 11 February 1971 (aged 70); Angamali, Ernakulam, Kerala
- Occupations: Critic, scholar, journalist
- Notable work: Granthavalokanam; Sahitheeyam; Vicharaviplavam; Vimarsanavum Veekshanavum
- Parents: Sankaran Nambuthiri; Devaki Amma
- Awards: Soviet Land Nehru Award

Kuttipuzha Krishna Pillai (1 August 1900 – 11 February 1971), was an Indian scholar, journalist, philosopher, atheist and critic of Malayalam language. Counted among the prominent literary critics of the language, he wrote a number of books covering the genres of literary criticism and philosophy. He presided over the Kerala Sahitya Akademi, chaired the advisory board of the Kerala Bhasha Institute as an ex-officio member and was a recipient of the Soviet Land Nehru Award.

== Biography ==
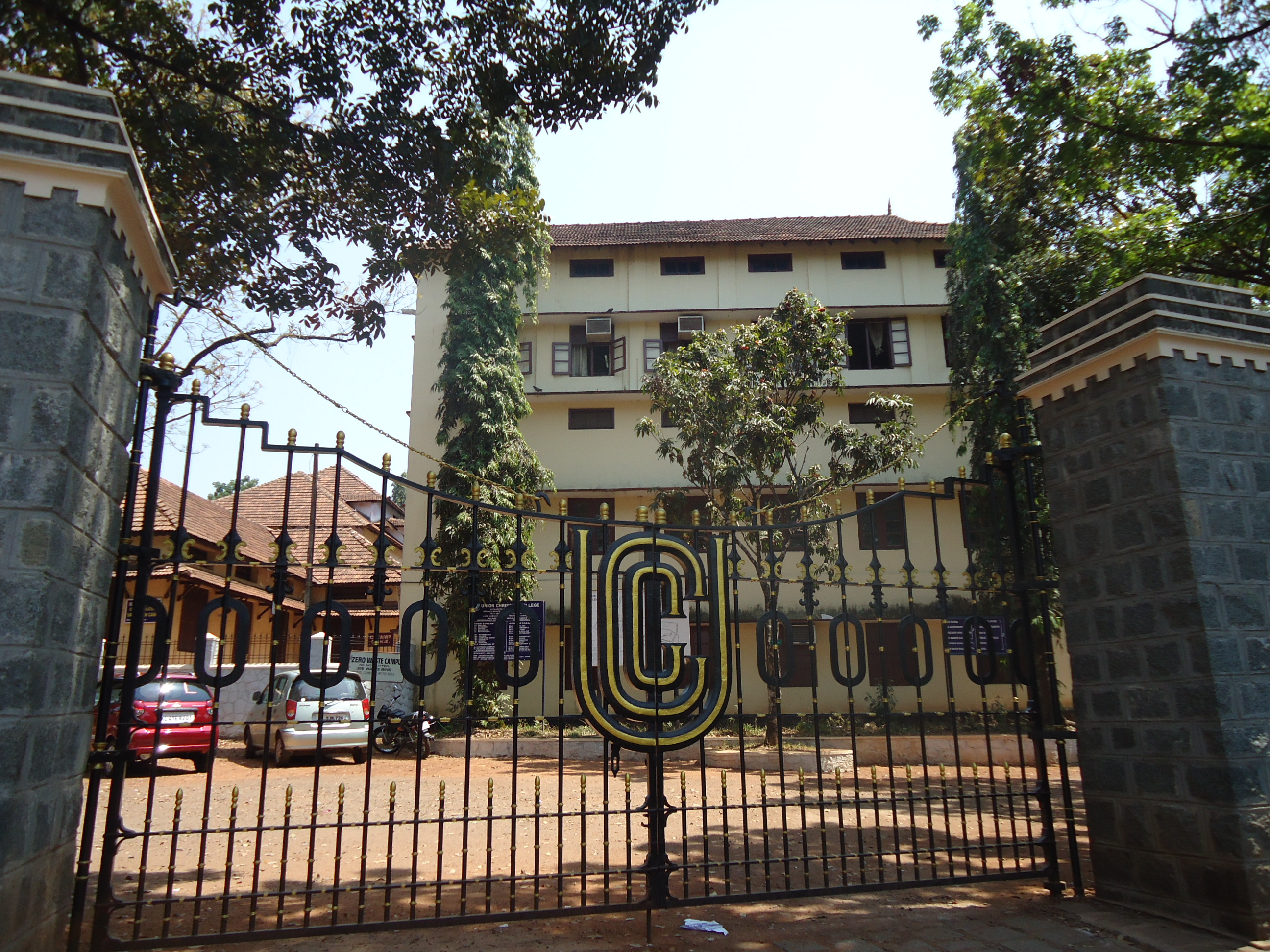
U. C. College Aluva

Krishna Pillai added the moniker Kuttipuzha to his name after the village in Paravur in Ernakulam district of the south Indian state of Kerala where he was born on 1 August 1900 to Oorumanakkal Sankaran Nambuthiri and Kurungattuveettil Devaki Amma. His schooling was at Ayiroor Primary School and St. Mary's High School, Aluva and after passing the school final examination in 1921, he joined the Alwaye Advaita Ashram school the next year. He stayed at the school until 1928 during which time he resumed his studies to pass the vidwan examination of the University of Madras to join the Union Christian College, Aluva as a faculty at the department of Malayalam, without interrupting his own studies to pass the degree of BOL in 1940. Before his superannuation from service as a professor in 1961, he sat in the senate of the University of Kerala in 1958.

Krishna Pillai, who remained a bachelor throughout his life, served as the president of the kerala Sahitya Akademi during 1968–71and was an ex-officio member of the advisory council of the Kerala Bhasha Institute. He also held several noted positions such as those of the convener of the text book committee and the director of the Children's literature workshop. It was during a function in Aluva on the last day of 1970, he fell unconscious and was taken to a hospital in Angamali where he died on 11 February 1971, at the age of 70.

== Legacy and honours ==
Krishna Pillai was known to have been among the writers who led Malayalam literature forward from the narrative prose of earlier writers such as Kottarathil Sankunni. He was a scholar of western and oriental philosophy and his book on philosophy, Vichara Viplavam was considered by many as an influential philosophical text. He was an atheist and he introduced different philosophical schools to Malayalam language through his works. His oeuvre comprises 19 books, which include Kuttipuzhayude Prabandangal - Thatwachitha, Kuttipuzhayude Prabandangal - Sahityavimarsham and Kuttipuzhayude Prabandangal - Nireekshanam, all the three published by Kerala Sahtya Akademi. Changampuzha Krishna Pillai was among the writers who were impressed by his scholarship and the poet dedicated one of his poems, Yavanika to Krishna Pillai.

Krishna Pillai was a recipient of Soviet Land Nehru Award. The Union Christian College where he spent most of his career, have instituted an annual scholarship, Prof. Kuttipuzha Krishna Pillai Memorial Endowment Scholarship and an annual award, Prof. Kuttipuzha Krishna Pillai Memorial Prize, in his honour.

== Selected bibliography ==
- Krishna Pillai. Kuttipuzha (1960). Chintha Tharangam. Kottayam: N.B.S.
- Krishna Pillai, Kuttipuzha (1990). Grandhaavalokam. Thrissur, Kerala Sahitya Academy.
- Krishna Pillai, Kuttipuzha (1990). Kuttipuzhayude prabhandangal: saahityavimarsanam. 1. Thrissur, Kerala Sahitya Academy.
- Krishna Pillai, Kuttipuzha. Smarana manjari (in Malayalam). Thrissur, Current Books.

== See also ==
- List of Malayalam-language authors by category
- List of Malayalam-language authors
