= Ulloor S. Parameswara Iyer =

Indian poet and historian (1877–1949)

Mahakavi Ulloor S. Parameswara
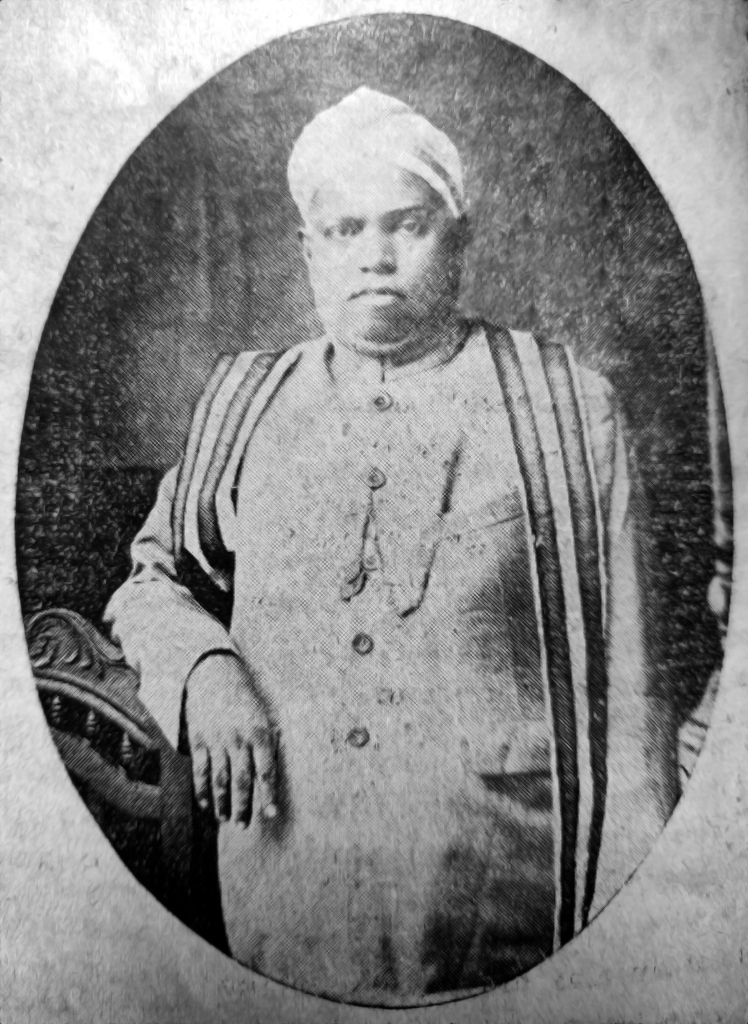
- Ulloor S. Parameswara Iyer in 1936
- Born: 6 June 1877; Changanacherry, Travancore
- Died: 15 June 1949 (aged 72)
- Occupations: Poet, historian
- Spouse(s): Ananthalakshmi Ammal, Subbammal
- Relatives: Subramania Iyer (father); Bhagavathi Ammal (mother)
- Writing career
- Notable works: Umakeralam; Karnabhushanam; Pingala; Kerala Sahitya Charitram

Ullur S. Parameswara Iyer (6 June 1877 – 15 June 1949), born Sambasivan but popularly known as Ullur, was an Indian poet of Malayalam literature and a historian. He was one of the modern triumvirate poets of Kerala in the first half of the 20th century, along with Kumaran Asan and Vallathol Narayana Menon. Umakeralam, a mahakavya, and Kerala Sahitya Charitram, a comprehensive history of the Malayalam language are two of his most important works.

== Biography ==
The desire to rise seen in the flying fireflies, the enthusiasm brimming within the singing cuckoo' to offer worship to other beings, the skill of the full-blown flower to entice the entire world, the expertise of the jumping bird to move its feet....... I have read ambrosia-like suggestive poetry even in mere rust; I have heard with my ear sweet veena sounds even in silence, Excerpts from Ulloor's Bhoothakkannadi (Microscope)

Ulloor was born on 6 June 1877 at Thamarassery Illam in Perunna, Changanassery in the south Indian state of Kerala to Subramania Iyer and Bhagavathi Ammal. His early schooling was at Chanagassery. Still, his father died when he was young. The family shifted to Thiruvananthapuram in 1890, where his mother raised him. He graduated with Honors in Philosophy from Maharajas College in 1897 and joined the Travancore State Services. He continued his studies and took a graduate degree in Law and master's degrees in Malayalam and Tamil. He held various positions in the government service such as those of a Land Revenue and Income Tax Commissioner before superannuating from service as the Chief Secretary of the State.

Iyer married Ananthalakshmi Ammal in 1892 when he was only 15 years old but his wife died in 1903. Subsequently, he married Subbammal in 1905, who died in 1930. He had three daughters and five sons from his two marriages. He died on 15 June 1949, aged 72.

== Legacy ==
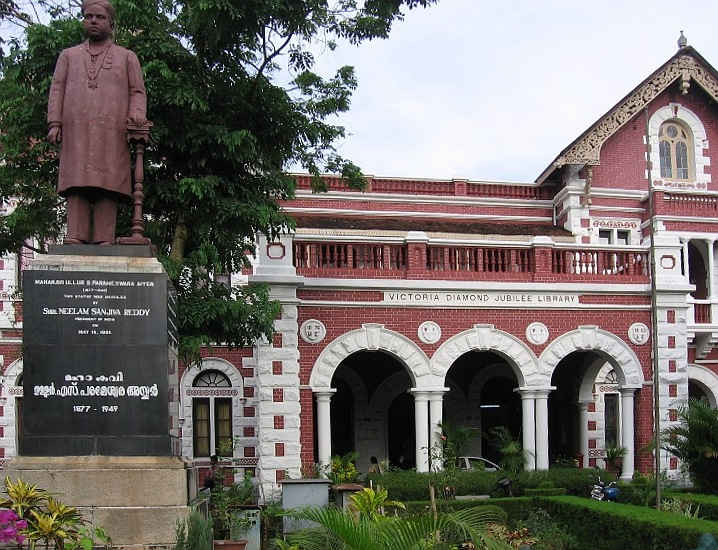
The statue of Ulloor in front of the State Central Library at Palayam

Iyer assumed his name, Ulloor, after the place of his ancestral home. Unlike the other two members of the modern triumvirates, Kumaran Asan and Vallathol Narayana Menon, who were romanticists, Ulloor was known to be a classicist and his works were marked by Sanskrit words, mythological references, satirical undertones and scholarship. One of his most notable works was published in 1914, a mahakavya titled Umakeralam when the language had only one complete mahakavya until then, Rukmamgadacharitham of Pandalam Kerala Varma. Poet K. Ayyappa Paniker noted that Umakeralam was a work of great devotion: devotion to the land, to the language, to a poetic tradition. He also wrote short narratives or khandakavyas and Karnabhooshanam and Pingala are two notable works in that genre; the former an account of Karna's generosity and dedication to principles while the latter is a portrayal of the transformation of a courtesan overnight into a pious and saintly character. Some of his other best known works were Bhakthideepika, and Chithrasala. Uloor also wrote quite a large number of lyrics and shorter pieces, now available in various collections. The most noted of his historical works was Kerala Sahitya Charitram, which narrates the history of Malayalam language, culture, and literature and the book was published by the University of Travancore in five volumes after the writer's death. The first three volumes were published respectively in 1953, 1954 and 1955. The last two volumes were published in 1957. He did research on ancient literature and palm leaf manuscripts and was successful in discovering works such as Rama Charitham poem and Doothavakyam prose. Besides, he wrote a play, Amba and such other works in prose as Bashachampukkal, a study on Champu literature and Vijnana Deepika, a compilation of essays in four volumes. He also wrote poems for children and the popular song, Kakke, Kakke, Koodevide is one among them.

== Honours ==
The Government of Kerala established Mahakavi Ulloor Memorial Library and Research Centre in 1956, to honour the memory of the poet, and it was shifted to a new premises in Jagathy, Thiruvananthapuram in 1966 which was inaugurated by S. Radhakrishnan, the then president of India. The institution which houses a research centre and a public library, became the first open university in Kerala for non-formal education in 1978, offering courses in Sanskrit, Malayalam literature, poetry and telecasting. It has also instituted an annual literary award, Ulloor Award, to recognise excellence in Malayalam poetry. The India Post released a commemorative stamp in 1980, depicting his portrait. On 15 May 1981, the then Indian President Neelam Sanjeeva Reddy unveiled a full size statue of Ulloor in the premises of the State Central Library, Kerala, at Palayam, Thiruvananthapuram.

== Works ==
=== Poetry ===
- — (1930). Arunodayam. Thiruvananthapuram: B. V. Book Depot. OCLC 38510518.
- — (1945). Sharanopaharam: Sabarimala Sastavineppattiyulla Sthothram. Trivandrum: R. T. Pillai and Sons. OCLC 38513938.
- — (1968). Manimanjusha.
- — (1969). Tharaharam.
- — (1969). Chithrashala. Trivandrum: Ulloor Publishers.
- — (1971). Tharangini. Trivandrum: Ulloor Publishers. OCLC 5413640.
- — (1972). Karna Bhooshanam (1 ed.). Trivandrum: Ulloor Publishers.
- — (1973). Bhakthideepika. Trivandrum: Ullur Publishers. OCLC 5834716.
- — (1977). Ulloorinte Padya Krithikal: Part 1. Kottayam: Sahithya Pravarthaka Co-operative Society.
- — (1981). Umakeralam. Trivandrum: Ullur Publishers.
- — (1990). Pingala. Trivandram: Ulloor Publishers.
- — (2006). Sree Andal Kavithakal. DC Books. ASIN B007E4WO40.
- — (2010). Ulloor Kavithakal Sampoornam. Kottayam: DC Books. ASIN 8126428015.
- — (2012). Deshadanakili. Calicut: Lipi Publications. ISBN 978-8188012329.
- — (2013). Padyamanjari. Kottayam: DC Books. ISBN 978-8126442034.
- — (2016). Dhoothavakyam. Public Domain Books.

=== Prose ===
- Vijñanadipika, a collection of essays in 4 volumes, 1930, 1933, 1937, 1938
- — (1953–1957). Kerala Sahitya Charitram (5 Volumes). University of Travancore. ISBN 978-81-930368-4-6.
- — (1969). Jagati Vēlāyudhan Nāir (ed.). Hīra: Savyākhyānaṃ. Thiruvananthapuraṃ: Uḷḷoor Publishers. OCLC 31063558.
- — (1971). A. V. Sankaran (ed.). Kāvyapr̲abhāvaṃ: savyākhyānaṃ. Trivandrum: Ullur Publishers. OCLC 31433537.
- — (1979). Uḷḷoorint̲e Pr̲abandhaṅṅaḷ (in Malayalam). Thiruvananthapuraṃ: University of Kerala. OCLC 17607218.

=== Translations into other languages ===
- Parameswara Iyer, Uḷḷoor S. (1978). English essays and poems of Mahakavi Ulloor. Translated by N. Viśvanāthan. Trivandrum: University of Kerala, Dept. of Publications. OCLC 7706032.
- Parameswara Iyer, Ulloor S. (1978). Selected poems of Mahakavi Ullur. Translated by K. Ramachandran Nair. Trivandrum: University of Kerala. OCLC 9978154.
- Parameswara Iyer, Uḷḷoor S.; Kerala (India); Department of Cultural Publications (1998). Progress of Travancore under H.H. Sree Moolam Tirunal. Thiruvananthapuram: Dept. of Cultural Publications, Govt. of Kerala. ISBN 9788186365663. OCLC 51087846.
- Parameswara Iyer, Uḷḷoor S.; Kerala (India); Department of Cultural Publications (2003). Essays on Travancore. Thiruvananthapuram: Cultural Publications Dept., Govt. of Kerala. OCLC 55147458.
- Parameswara Iyer, Ulloor S. (1980). "The Ornaments of Karna". Journal of South Asian Literature. 15 (2). Translated by K. Raghavan Pillai: 38–71. JSTOR 40861160.

=== Works on Ulloor ===
- Sahrudayavedi (1976). Ulloorinte Sahityasādhana: Padanaṃ. Trichur; Kōṭṭayaṃ: Sahrudayavedi; National Book Stall (distributors). OCLC 33252123.
- George, K. M (1977). Mahakavi Ulloor: a centenary volume. Trivandrum: Mahakavi Ulloor Memorial Library and Research Institute. OCLC 5240774.
- Sukumār Azhikode (1979). Mahakavi Ulloor. New Delhi: Sahitya Akademi. OCLC 7328266.

== Trivia ==
- His name at birth was Sambasivan, but he was called by his family as Parameshwaran.
- K. Subramaniam, the director of Prahlada, the 1941 Malayalam movie, was the nephew of Ulloor.
