= Kuttikrishna Marar =

Indian writer

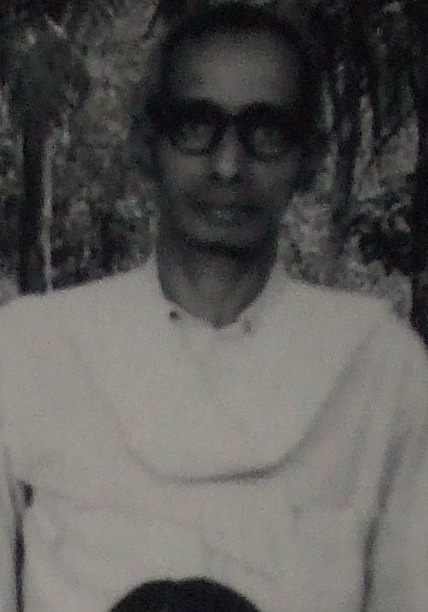
- Born: 15 June 1900; Triprangode, British India
- Died: 6 April 1973 (aged 72); Kozhikode, Kerala, India
- Occupations: Writer, Literary Critic
- Spouse: Narayanikutty Marasyar
- Relatives: Karikkatt Marathu Krishna Marar (father); Lakshmikutty Marasyar (mother)
- Writing career
- Notable works: Bharatha Paryaadanam, Kala Jeevitam thanne, Malayala Saili
- Notable awards: 1966 Sahitya Akademi Award; 1966 Kerala Sahitya Akademi Award

Kizhakke Marathu Kuttikrishna Marar (15 June 1900 – 6 April 1973) was an Indian essayist and literary critic of Malayalam literature. He was known for Bharathaparyaadanam, a critical study of the Mahabharata, which is counted by many among the most influential books in Malayalam and was a recipient of the Sahitya Akademi Award and Kerala Sahitya Akademi Award.

== Biography ==
Kuttikrishna Marar was born on 15 June 1900 in Triprangode, in Malappuram district of the south Indian state of Kerala to Karikkatt Marathu Krishna Marar and kizhakke Marattu Lakshmikutty Marasyar. He learnt percussion, which was the family profession, along with drawing as early education but his life took a turn when he joined Sree Neelakanta Government Sanskrit College Pattambi where he had the opportunity to study under two known teachers, Punnassery Nambi and Shambu Sharma. Subsequently, he passed the Sahityashiromani examination and started his career as Sahithyacharya at the Kerala Kalamandalam where he worked alongside Vallathol Narayana Menon for 15 years, during which period, he published many of his writings. He was able to find himself a mentor under Nalapat Narayana Menon. From 1938 to 1961 he was the proofreader of the Malayalam daily newspaper, Mathrubhumi.

Marar married Kizhakkemarath Narayanikutty Marasyar in 1924 and they had seven children in that four sons and three daughters. Towards the later part of his life, he was more inclined to spiritual pursuits. He died on 6 April 1973, at the age of 72.

== Literary career ==
Kuttikrishna Marar was a harsh critic of literary indiscretions. His work, Bharathaparyadanam, a critical study of the Mahabharata is considered by many as a seminal work and is a part of the Central Board of Secondary Education syllabus. Another of his important works is Kala Jeevitham Thanne (Art is Life itself), which won him Kerala Sahitya Akademi Award, Kendra Sahitya Akademi Award and M. P. Paul Prize. Malayala Shaili, another of his notable works, is one of the most authentic treatises on proper Malayalam usage. Sahithyasallapam, Danthagopuram and Kaivilakku (collections of literary criticism) are some of his other works on literary criticism. Besides, he has also published over 19 collections of essays on literary criticism.

== Awards and honours ==
In 1967, Marar received Sahithya Ratnam award from Pattambi Sree Neelakanda Sanskrit College and Sahithya Nipunan award from Government Sanskrit College, Tripunithura. Sahitya Akademi awarded him their annual award in 1966, for his work, Kala Jeevitham Thanne. He received another award for the same work the same year, the inaugural Kerala Sahitya Akademi Award for Literary Criticism. He received the M. P. Paul Prize also in 1966. His life and work has been documented by many writers and Marar Lavanyabhavathinte Yukthi Shilpam, one such work written by M. Thomas Mathew was selected for Vayalar Award in 2009.

== Bibliography ==
=== Literary criticism ===
- Kuttikrishna Marar (25 May 2011). Bharathaparyatanam (in Malayalam). Marar Sahithya Prakasham. ASIN B007E4VNAG.
- Kuttikrishna Marar. Bhashavruthangal. Marar Sahityaprakasam.
- Kuttikrishna Marar. Vruthasilpam. Marar Sahityaprakasam.
- Kuttikrishna Marar. Hasya Sahithyam. Marar Sahityaprakasam. Archived from the original on 22 August 2016.
- Kuttikrishna Marar. Dhanthagopuram. Marar Sahityaprakasam.
- Kuttikrishna Marar. Sahithya Paryatanam. Marar Sahityaprakasam.
- Kuttikrishna Marar. Sahithya Sallapam. Marar Sahityaprakasam.
- Kuttikrishna Marar. Kaivilakku. Marar Sahityaprakasam.
- Kuttikrishna Marar. Poojya Pooja. Marar Sahityaprakasam.
- Kuttikrishna Marar. Sahithya Veekshanam. Marar Sahityaprakasam.
- Kuttikrishna Marar. Bhashaparichayam. Marar Sahityaprakasam.
- Kuttikrishna Marar. Sahithyavidya. Marar Sahityaprakasam.
- Kuttikrishna Marar (2012). Saranagathi. Marar Sahithya Prakasham. "3 volumes"
- Kuttikrishna Marar. Rishiprasadham. Marar Sahityaprakasam.
- Kuttikrishna Marar. Rajanganam. Marar Sahityaprakasam.
- Kuttikrishna Marar. Malayalashaili. Marar Sahityaprakasam.
- Kuttikrishna Marar. Nalacharithathiloode. Marar Sahityaprakasam.
- Kuttikrishn -Marar. Kala Jeevitham Thanne. Marar Sahityaprakasam.
- Kuttikrishna Marar. Sahithya Bhooshanam. Marar Sahityaprakasam.
- Kuttikrishna Marar. Charchayogam. Marar Sahityaprakasam.
- Kuttikrishna Marar. Inguninnangolam. Marar Sahityaprakasam.
- Kuttikrishna Marar. Sahithyasesham. Marar Sahityaprakasam.
- Kuttikrishna Marar. Palarum Palathum. Marar Sahityaprakasam.
- Kuttikrishna Marar. Geethaparikramanam. Marar Sahityaprakasam.
- Kuttikrishna Marar. Pathinanchu Upanyasam. Marar Sahityaprakasam.

=== Poems and plays ===
- Kuttikrishna Marar (1994). Jeevichirunnal (Old ed.). Marar Sahityaprakasam. Archived from the original on 9 February 2019. "Play - with introduction by George Irumpayam"
- Kuttikrishna Marar (1985). Nizhalattam (Old ed.). Marar Sahityaprakasam. "a collection of plays and poems"

=== Children's literature ===
- Kuttikrishna-Marar. Vishwamithran. Marar Sahityaprakasam. "story retold by Marar"

=== Translations by Marar ===
- Kalidasan (2000). Kumarasambhavam. Translated by Kuttikrishna Marar. Marar Sahithya Prakasham. Archived from the original on 26 August 2016. "commentary by Marar"
- Adi Shankara (1995). Bhaja Govindam. Translated by Kuttikrishna Marar. Marar Sahithya Prakasham.
- Kalidasan (2012). Abhijnana Sakunthalam. Translated by Kuttikrishna Marar. Marar Sahithya Prakasham. "commentary by Marar"
- Kalidasan (2014). Meghasandesam. Translated by Kuttikrishna Marar. Marar Sahithya Prakasham. "commentary by Marar"
- Kalidasan (2018). Raghuvamsham. Translated by Kuttikrishna Marar. Marar Sahithya Prakasham. "commentary by Marar"

=== Memoirs ===
- Kuttikrishna Marar (1995). Mararude Kathukal. Marar Sahithya Prakasham.

=== Translations into English ===
- Kuttikrishna Marar (1968). Rishiprasadam.
- Kuttikrishna Marar (1989). Journey Through Mahabharata. Kerala Sahitya Akademi.
