= Pallathu Raman =

Mahakavi Pallath Raman (1892–1950), was a poet, writer, social reformer and community leader from Kerala, India. He was born in the city of Kochi, India. He was influenced by the teachings of Sree Narayana Guru. His most famous work was Amrita Pulinam, which fetched him many awards. He was a professor at Palakkad Victoria college and then Maharajas college cochin. His work had some influence from Western poetry and Rajput mythology. He was known for writing love poetry.
