= Malayalam triumvirate poets =

Thunchaththu Ezhuthachan, Cherusseri Namboothiri and Kunchan Nambiar

The Prāchīna Kavitrayam (ancient triumvirate) of Malayalam poetry are Thunchaththu Ezhuthachan, Cherusseri Namboothiri and Kunchan Nambiar. These medieval era triumvirate poets was chosen in the basis of Bhakthi.

The modern triumvirate poets were chosen on the basis of their impact on social activism. The Ādhunika kavitrayam (modern triumvirate) of Malayalam poetry are N. Kumaran Asan, Vallathol Narayana Menon and Ulloor S. Parameswara Iyer.
