= Thirayattam =

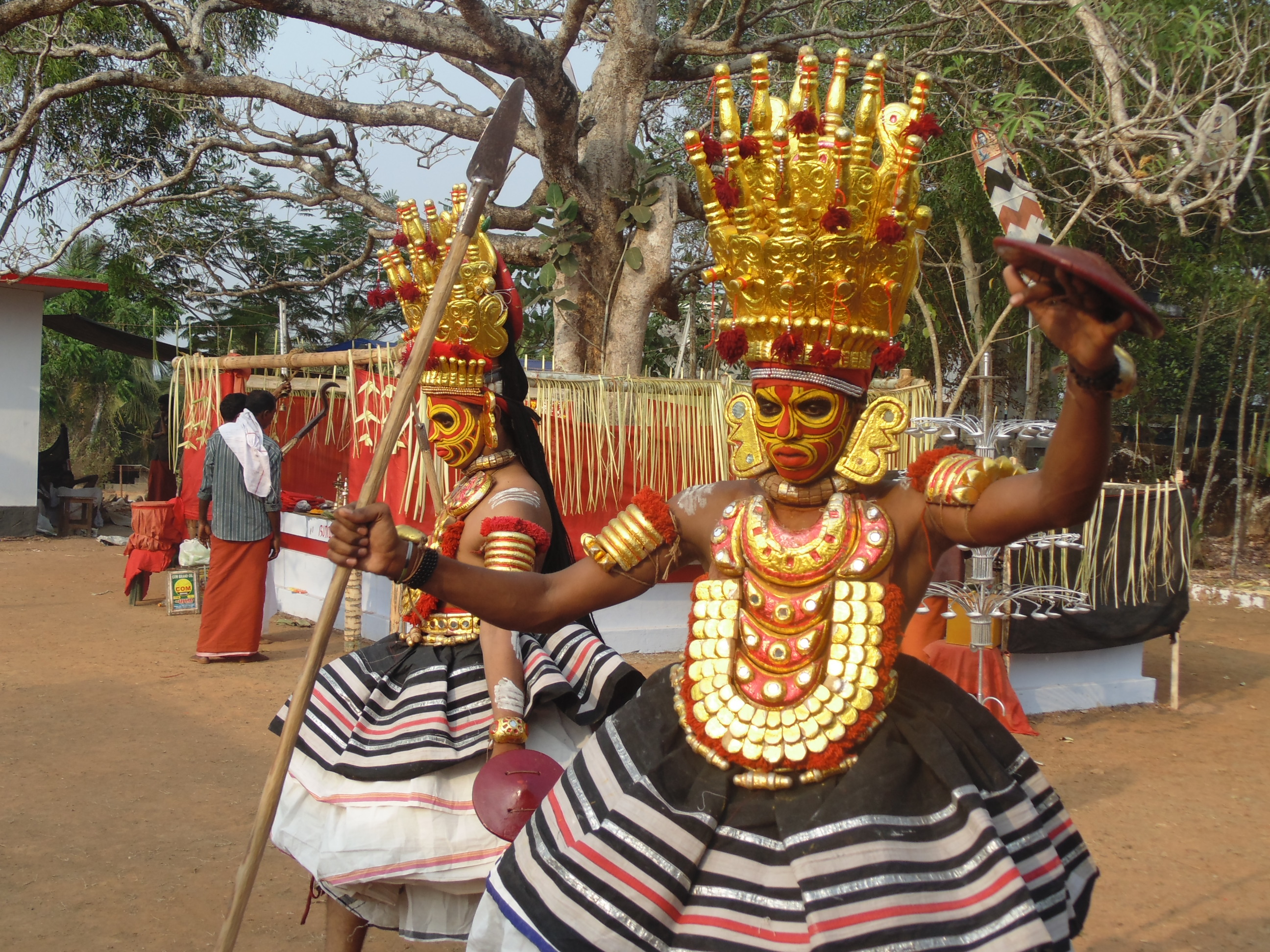
Vellat kolam of deity Karumakan

Thirayattam (Malayalam) is a ritualistic art form that is performed annually in the South Malabar region of the Indian state of Kerala. It is a tribal art form that combines dance, acting routines, songs, instrumental music, face writing, martial arts and rituals.

== History ==
The art form had its origins from the tradition and customs of the Prehistoric era and the strange costumes and rituals in Thirayatam are reflections of the social life during the period. Thirayatam has some similarities with other ritual art forms of the region such as "Theyyam" of North Malabar, "Mudiyet" of Central Kerala, "Padayani" in Travancore and "Buta Kola" in Tulunadu.

== Performance ==
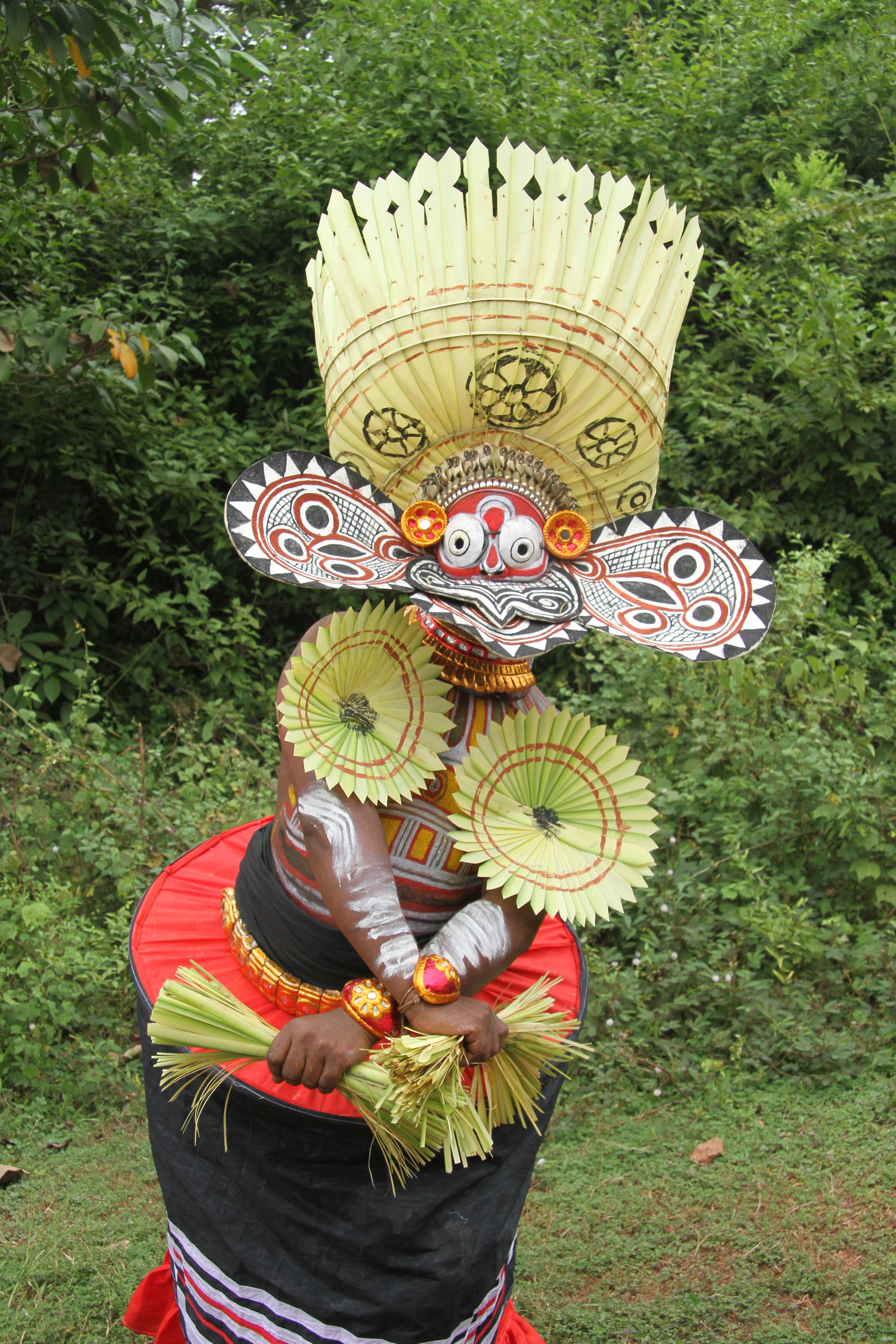
Thira kolam of deity Kuttichathan

Thirayattam is a tribal art form that combines dance, acting routines, songs, instrumental music, face writing, martial arts and rituals. The unique rituals, costumes and artistic performances differentiate Thirayattam from other art forms. It is usually enacted in courtyards called kaavukal (sacred groves) in village shrines of Kozhikode and Malappuram districts. The dance which is staged in the courtyards is accompanied by musical instruments such as Chenda melam and a warm light.

Traditionally, the dance was performed by Perumannan and Vannan communities though other communities such as Panan and Cherumar also perform it. The performer usually reaches a trance state and enacts the moves of the "Moorthy" (deity) vigorously, exhibiting belligerent mannerism and gestures.

Only men perform this art form. Thirayattam performers can take any of the three forms or Kolams which are Vellat, Thira and Chanthutira. Vellat kolams represent the childhood of the Murthis (deities), while Thirakolams represent the youth and Chanthuthira represent the grown matured form. Various stories of mythological deities, local deities and idols are enacted. Ancient rituals like tree worship, Naga worship, nature worship, hero worship, mountain deity concepts, local deity concepts etc. are also practiced in Thirayattam. There are separate totams (scenes) for each story and the mythology of the deities is elaborated at length in each of the totams.

Each kolam has a separate face and script for enactment. The costumes and makeup materials are made from natural materials. Palm leaves, bamboo and jack fruit wood are used for this. Other traditional music instruments such as Chenda, Ilatalam, Thudi, Panchayudham and Kuzhal are used in Thiraiyattam. Special songs may accompany the performance such as the Anchantadi songs used only for hunting scenes. Rhyming and singing make the individual dancers stand out. Dancers take steps while dancing and use symbolic weapons reminiscent of Kalaripayattu, a traditional martial art form. For example, Karumakan is given symbolic weapons like spear, Karivilli with bow and arrow, Bhagavati with palli sword, Veerabhadra with silver axe, Murti with staff and shield. Sometimes, the Thirakolas perform a lively dance called Chutukali. Chutukali is a rhythmic display of dance and martial arts where a dancer carries a lighted torch in both hands.

== Notable deities ==
Image	Deity
	Bhadrakali
	Bhagavati
	Bhairavan
	Gulikan
	Gurudevan
	Karivilli
	Kariyathan
	Kulavan
	Karnavar
	Karumakan
	Kuttichathan
	Moori Karion
	Murti
	Muthashi
	Nagakali
	Odakali
	Pookkutti
	Pottan
	Veerabhadra

== See also ==
- Theyyam
- Buta Kola
- Yakshagana
- Koothu
