= Aami =

2018 film directed by Kamal

- Poster
- Directed by: Kamal
- Written by: Kamal
- Produced by: Raphael Thomas Pozholiparambil
- Starring: Manju Warrier; Murali Gopy; Tovino Thomas; Anoop Menon; Anand Bal
- Cinematography: Madhu Neelakandan
- Edited by: A. Sreekar Prasad
- Music by: M. Jayachandran
- Production companies: Reel & Real Cinema
- Distributed by: Central Pictures
- Release date: 9 February 2018
- Country: India
- Language: Malayalam

Aami is a 2018 Indian Malayalam-language biographical film based on the life of poet-author Kamala Das. It is written and directed by Kamal and stars Manju Warrier as Kamala Surayya, along with Murali Gopy, Tovino Thomas, Anoop Menon, and Anand Bal. The film was released on 9 February 2018. It won two Kerala State Film Awards.

== Plot ==
Aami portrays the life of writer Madhavikutty, mainly focused on her childhood, family life, marital life, devotion to Lord Krishna, and conversion to Islam in the later periods of her life.

== Cast ==
- Manju Warrier as Kamala Surayya (Kamala)
  - Neelanjana as Teenage Aami
    - Aangelina Abraham as Childhood Aami
- Tovino Thomas as Lord Krishna
- Murali Gopy as Madhava Das, Madhavikutty's husband
- Anoop Menon as Akbar Ali
- Vijayalakshmi as Balamani Amma
  - Rasna Pavithran as Young Balamani Amma
- Anil Nedumangad as V. M. Nair
- K. P. A. C. Lalitha as Januvamma
- Vinaya Prasad as Sulochana Nalappat, writer and Kamala's sister
  - Jitha as Youngest Sulochana
    - Swasthika as Younger Sulochana Nalapat
- Rahul Madhav as Kamala's imaginary friend
- Indrans as Narayanan, Goldsmith
- Jyothikrishna as Malathi
- Anjali Nair as Khamar
- Balachandran Chullikadu a Himself
- Renji Panicker as S. K. Nair, Malayalanadu Editor
- Lakshmi Priya as Madhavikutty fan
- Sreedevi Unni as Ammamma
- Valsala Menon as Muttashi
- Lal Kumar as Monu (MD Nalappatt)
- Uttara as Young Januvamma
- Krishnan Balakrishnan as a reporter
- Dinesh Prabhakar as angry husband of Madhavikutty fan
- Jayaraj Warrier as Sukumaran
- Sethu Lakshmi as Kuttiamma
- Kritika Pradeep
- Anand Bal as Chinnan Das

== Production ==
In 2016, Bollywood actress Vidya Balan was signed for the role of Kamala Surayya, but in January 2017, she backed out from the film citing creative differences with Kamal. In 2016, Murali Gopy was confirmed in the role of Madhava Das, Kamala's husband, and Prithviraj Sukumaran in a fictional character. Later in the year, Prithviraj also opted out from the film due to his tight filming schedules and recommended Tovino Thomas instead. Later, Anoop Menon was added to the cast. Media outlets reported several names as a replacement for Balan. But in February 2017, Kamal denied all the reports and said that he was not in a hurry and was still looking for a person whose features matched that of Surayya's, which was the reason he chose Balan in the first place. Although he revealed he is also considering suggestions from others. In February 2017, Manju Warrier signed to play Kamala Surayya.

Principal photography commenced on 24 March 2017 at Kamala Surayya Memorial in Punnayurkulam, Thrissur. Ottapalam was the main location in the first schedule that lasted till April. The other locations were Mumbai, Kolkata, and Ernakulam.

== Soundtrack ==
Aami

Soundtrack album by M. Jayachandran & Taufiq Qureshi
- Released: 2018
- Genre: Feature film soundtrack
- Languages: Malayalam; Bengali
- Label: Manorama Music

M. Jayachandran chronology
Pullikaaran Staraa' (2017)	Aami (2018)	Odiyan (2018)

The film score is composed by Bijibal. The film features original songs composed by two composers, M. Jayachandran and Taufiq Qureshi. Qureshi's compositions are ghazals with lyrics written by Academy Award winner Gulzar. The lyrics for the Malayalam songs are written by Rafeeq Ahamed.

Track listing
No.	Title	Lyrics	Music	Singer(s)	Length
1.	"Neer Maathalam"	Rafeeq Ahamed	M. Jayachandran	Shreya Ghoshal, Arnab Dutta	5:12
2.	"Pranayamayi Radha"	Rafeeq Ahamed	M. Jayachandran	Shreya Ghoshal, Vijay Yesudas	4:59
3.	"Chand Hoga"	Gulzar	Taufiq Qureshi	Javed Ali	3:27
4.	"Aadhi raath"	Gulzar	Taufiq Qureshi	Roop	3:44
5.	"Umar Salon Sein"	Gulzar	Taufiq Qureshi	Javed Ali	3:00
Total length:					20:22

== Reception ==
On the review aggregator website Rotten Tomatoes, 60% of 5 critics' reviews are positive, with an average rating of 6/10.

Sujit Chandrakumar of The Times of India gave 3.5/5 stars and wrote, "Though the director goes back and forth in time while depicting this exhilarating tale of a contemporary and complex character, the narrative of 'Aami' is largely simple and straight forward." Manoj Kumar R of Indian Express gave 3.5/5 stars and wrote, "It is, indeed, impressive to watch Manju Warrier play the role of a conflicted woman. Her conviction in the performance is what keeps our attention even when narration loses steam."

== Awards and nominations ==
Kerala State Film Awards

- Best Female Playback Singer- Shreya Ghoshal for the song "Neer Maathalam"
- Best Background Score- Bijibal
