= V. M. Devadas =

Indian poet

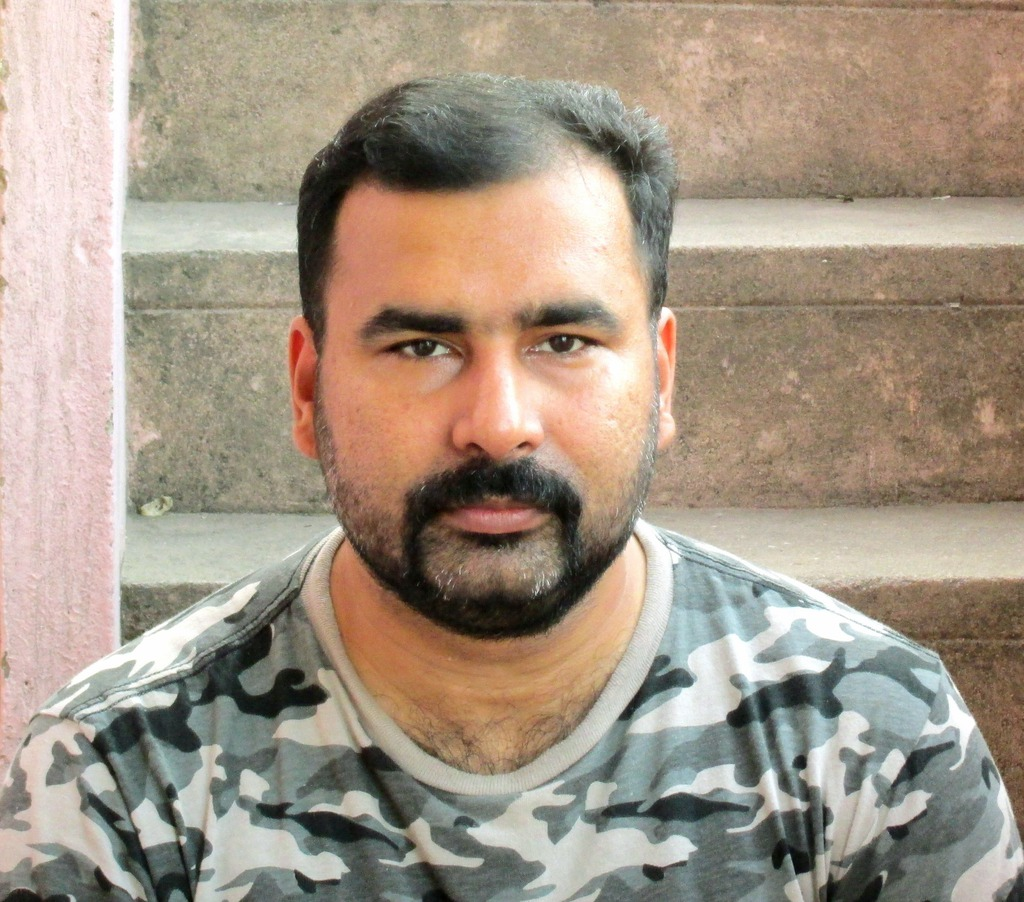
- Born: March 1981 (age 45); Wadakkancherry, Thrissur, Kerala, India
- Occupations: Novelist, short story writer
- Writing career
- Language: Malayalam
- Genres: Novel, short story, essays
- Notable works: Pannivetta, Shalabhajeevitham
- Website: Official blog

V. M. Devadas (born March 1981) is a Malayalam novelist, short story writer and screenwriter from Wadakkancherry, Kerala, India.

== List of works ==
=== Novels ===
- Dildo: Aaru Maranangalude Pulp Fiction Patapusthakam (Palghat: Logos, 2009)
- Pannivetta (Trivandrum: Chintha, 2010)
- Cheppum Panthum (Kottayam:DC Books, 2017)
- Eru (Kottayam:DC Books, 2021)

=== Short story collections ===
- Marana Sahayi (Kottayam:DC Books, 2011)
- Salabha Jeevitham (Trivandrum: Chintha, 2014)
- Avanavan Thuruthu (Kottayam:DC Books, 2016)
- Vazhi Kanupidikkunnavar (Calicut: Mathrubhumi, 2018)
- Kadinu Nadukkoru Maram (Kottayam:DC Books, 2021)
- Katha (Kottayam: S.P.C.S., 2021)

== Screenwriter ==
Name	Year	Production	Director
Garass	2014	Pune Film Institute	Sanju Surendran
Nadakantham	2017	Tungsten Brains	Vishnuprasad

== Awards ==
- 2010: Malayala Manorama Novel Carnival Award – Pannivetta
- 2011: Nooranad Haneef Memorial Award – Pannivetta
- 2011: Chandrika Katha Puraskaram – Tibet (Story)
- 2015 : Ettumanoor Kavya Vedhi Puraskaram – SalabhaJeevitham
- 2016 : Kerala Sahitya Akademi's Geetha Hiranyan Endowment Award 2014 – MaranaSahayi
- 2016 - Mazhavil Sahitya Puraskaram – Chaavusakshyam
- 2017 – Ankanam Sahitya Puraskaram – SalabhaJeevitham
- 2017 – Manoraj KathaSamahara Puraskaram – Avanavan Thuruthu
- 2017 – C.V Sreeraman Smrithi Puraskaram – Avanavan Thuruthu
- 2017 – Yes Press Books Novel Award – Cheppum Panthum
- 2018 – Five Continents International Film Festival – Best Drama Short Film – Nadakantham
- 2018 – Muthukulam Raghavan Pillai award for best short film script at K.P.A.C International Fim Fest – Nadakantham
- 2018 – Karur Neelakanta Pillai Smaraka Katha Puraskaram – Panthirukulam
- 2018 – Swami Vivekananda Yuva Prathibha Award instituted by the Kerala State Youth Welfare Board – Avanavan Thuruthu
- 2018 – K.V. Sudhakaran Katha Puraskaram – Avanavan Thuruthu
- 2019 – Vaikom Muhammad Basheer Malayala Padhanakendram Award – Cheppum Panthum
- 2019 – D Sreeman Namboothiri Sahithya Puraskaram – Cheppum Panthum
- 2021 – K.A. Kodungallur Madhyamam Sahitya Puraskaram - Keezhkkamthookku
- 2022 – Thoppil Ravi Smaraka Sahithya Puraskaram - Eru
- 2022 – Kerala Sahitya Akademi Award for Story Collection - Vazhi Kandupidikkunnavar
- 2023 – O. V. Vijayan Literary Award - Kadinu Nadukkoru Maram
