= Malayalanadu =

Indian literary magazine

- Editor: S. K. Nair
- Frequency: Weekly
- Total circulation (1971): 80,000
- First issue: 1969
- Final issue: 1984
- Company: New India Printers
- Country: India
- Based in: Quilon
- Language: Malayalam
- Website: Magazine archives

Malayalanadu was a Malayalam-language Indian literary magazine published from 1969 to 1984, under the editorship of S. K. Nair. Based in Quilon, Kerala, the magazine emerged as one of the leading literary periodicals of its era. Malayalanadu played a significant role in shaping the cultural landscape of Kerala during the 1970s and early 1980s.

== Beginning ==
Malayalanadu was established in 1969 by S. K. Nair, a successful businessman and cashew broker based in Quilon, Kerala. Nair was actively involved in cultural and literary circles. He was inspired to launch a magazine by his friend K. Balakrishnan, the publisher of Kaumudi Weekly. Following nine months of preparation, the inaugural edition was launched on 18 May 1969. The first editorial committee comprised V. B. C. Nair, Parakkode N. R. Kurup (Janayugom) and Perumbadavam Sreedharan. Notable works featured in the debut edition included Kakkanadan's novel Parankimala, G. Vivekandan's novel Ammu, Thakazhi Sivasankara Pillai's short story Prethavicharam and M. Krishnan Nair's column Sahitya Varaphalam, contributing to the magazine's immediate success. Demand was so high that Nair had to print additional copies. The magazine was priced at 30 paise per issue. The cover of the first issue was crafted by Sivan Studios and featured an image of an elderly Namboothiri man holding a traditional palm leaf umbrella. The first issue also included diverse articles and columns such as N. P. Chellappan Nair's Sasthavu-Ayyappan (essay), Malayattoor Ramakrishnan's Anamath (column), Dr. M. S. Parameswaran Nair's Sastravum Sahityavum (essay), P. C. Sukumaran Nair's Roopangal Bhavangal (column), V. Subhadra's Kazhinja Azhcha (column), R. Ramachandran Nair's Thumbapookkal (poem), K. V. Dev's Malayalanadu (poem), Sreekumaran Thampi's Minus x Minus = Plus (poem), Veeran's Balalokam (column), K. Balakrishnan's Apsarassukalum Bhadrakaliyum (essay), Thanthri's Pachuvum Kovalanum (column) and Cynic's film review on Hiroshima, Mon Amour.

== Growth and influence ==
=== Notable authors and works ===
At the time of Malayalanadu's launch, Mathrubhumi Illustrated Weekly was the leading literary magazine in Malayalam. According to writer Sethu, Mathrubhumi typically featured two stories in each issue, often reserving one for senior writers. This created an opportunity for Malayalanadu to attract young and aspiring writers. Senior figures like Thakazhi Sivasankara Pillai and P. Kesavadev also contributed regularly to Malayalanadu, which gave equal importance to both young and established writers. Among the young writers nurtured by Malayalanadu was Padmarajan, who penned his second major story, Nee (Veendum) Nee Nee, at the age of 23, following his debut with Lola Milford Enna American Penkidavu in Kaumudi Weekly. Several of his stories, including Pukakkannada, Pathayile Kattu, Ore Chandran, Vanitha and Choondal, alongside the novelette Nanmakalude Suryan and novels such as Rithubhedangalude Parithoshikam and Udakappola, were published in Malayalanadu. Udakappola, later adapted into the popular film Thoovanathumbikal, featured illustrations by the renowned film director Bharathan when it first appeared in Malayalanadu. Additionally, artists like C. N. Karunakaran, Artist Namboothiri, M. V. Devan, A. C. K. Raja, and K. N. Damodaran frequently contributed illustrations to works published in Malayalanadu. Sethu himself published stories like Satru, Janab Kunhi Moosa Haji, Rogikalude Desam, and his second novel, Nananja Mannu, in Malayalanadu.

Apart from Parankilamala, which debuted in the inaugural issue of Malayalanadu, Kakkanadan contributed his novels Orotha, Adiyaravu and Ee Naykkalude Lokam, alongside stories such as Thalamurayude Sabdam, Kalam Ente Mathram, Kuttabodham, Sarangdharan and Cheytha Thettu to Malayalanadu. Kakkanadan also was part of the editorial committee during 1971-73.

Madhavikutty contributed several stories, including Chandrarasmikal, Rohini and Madhaviyude Makal to Malayalanadu. In a controversial 1971 article published in The Illustrated Weekly of India, Madhavikutty reflected on her relationship with the editor of a Kerala weekly, referred to as 'K,' widely believed to be S. K. Nair. Madhavikutty's autobiography, Ente Katha, debuted in the 1971 Onam special edition of Malayalanadu, garnering significant attention and controversy. The autobiography's publication was halted amid the ensuing controversies, but Malayalanadu cited health reasons for Madhavikutty's temporary departure from writing and that she would resume writing at a later date. According to V. B. C. Nair, the publication of Ente Katha substantially increased Malayalanadu's circulation from 30,000 to 80,000 copies within a fortnight. Madhavikutty originally wrote Ente Katha in English, with the translated version of the original appearing in Malayalanadu. A revised English version was serialised in the Bombay-based The Current Weekly, edited by Ayoob Syed, from January to December 1974. Madhavikutty continued her association with Malayalanadu by penning the autobiographical series Ente Lokam, which commenced in 1976. However, a rift emerged between Madhavikutty and S. K. Nair following the publication of Pamman's Bhranthu in Malayalanadu. Madhavikutty believed that the novel's main character, Ammukutty, was based on her persona and portrayed her in a vulgar manner.

O. V. Vijayan also frequently wrote in Malayalanadu. Dharmapuranam was serialised in the magazine. Although announced in July 1975, the novel wasn't published in Malayalanadu until the lifting of the emergency in 1977. It was published as a book only in 1985. Dharmapuranam stands as one of the most seminal political satires in Malayalam literature. Vijayan also wrote several short stories for Malayalanadu, including Nidrayude Thazhvara, Aalmaram, Theeyathikal, Neela Suryan, Abhayam, Kannukalikal, Vridhayum Makanum Kazhuthayum, Poovu, Kattu Murkhan, Desa Sneham and Poocha.

Perumbadavam Sreedharan, a member of the first editorial committee, had a brief tenure of six months on the editorial committee. However, he published several works in Malayalanadu. According to Sreedharan, Malayalanadu filled the gap left by defunct publications such as Malayala Rajyam and Desabandhu. It was Sreedharan who introduced V. K. N. to S. K. Nair. V. K. N. subsequently authored several novels for Malayalanadu, including Kunhan Menon, Syndicate, General Chathans, Pithamahan II, Anusmarana and Payyante First Lady.

Malayalanadu published the stories of all major short story writers of the time including Thakazhi Sivasankara Pillai, P. Kesavadev, M. T. Vasudevan Nair and Lalithambika Antharjanam. It had poems by stalwarts like P. Kunhiraman Nair, Balamani Amma, M. Govindan, Satchidanandan, Balachandran Chullikad, Kunjunni Mash etc. It also carried translations from major writers such as Jorge Luis Borges, Jean-Paul Sartre, Kahlil Gibran, Vladimir Mayakovsky, Pearl S. Buck, Amrita Pritam, Robert Frost, Rabindranath Tagore, Robert Arthur Jr., Alexander Pushkin, Albert Camus and Franz Kafka.

=== Columns and features ===
M. Krishnan Nair's Sahitya Varaphalam stood out as the most popular feature in Malayalanadu. This column appeared in every edition of Malayalanadu, with just one exception when Krishnan Nair was unable to write due to illness. Recognised as the longest-running column in the history of Malayalam literature, Sahitya Varaphalam started in the first edition of Malayalanadu. After the closure of Malayalanadu, the column continued uninterrupted, moving to publications like Kalakaumudi and later to Samakalika Malayalam Vaarika. Sahitya Varaphalam significantly contributed to the exposure of foreign authors and the enhancement of reading standards among Malayalee readers.

V. B. C. Nair served on the editorial board of Malayalanadu for a long period. He wrote the column Poornatha Thedunna Apoorna Bindukkal for Malayalanadu and also contributed film reviews under the alias Mangalassery. One review, for the film Njan Njan Mathram, sparked controversy when its writer Thoppil Bhasi penned a scathing letter to S. K. Nair, accusing Mangalassery of what is now termed 'review bombing'. Bhasi's letter, published in full in Malayalanadu, alleged that Mangalassery accepted money from film producers to promote certain films and even reviewed films unreleased in India. Bhasi was also critical of Mangalassery's reviewing capabilities as well as Malayalanadu's overall quality. However, several noted writers refuted Bhasi's arguments as a mere personal attack on the reviewer, and led to a series of subsequent issues addressing the controversy in detail. Similarly, a review of V. Rajakrishnan's book Rogathinte Pookkal also incited a prolonged argument that lasted six months.

Ambalanadayil by Venni Vasupillai was another column that ran for several years, providing detailed insights into various famous temples of Kerala.

=== Special editions ===
Malayalanadu also published special editions, with the first yearly special edition released in 1970 and edited by R. Nandakumar, who joined Malayalanadu as a replacement for Perumbadavam Sreedharan. This edition featured several renowned stories, including M. T. Vasudevan Nair's Sthalapuranam, Padmarajan's Pukakkannada, M. Mukundan's Mundanam Cheyyappetta Jeevitham and Zachariah's Prapanchathinte Avasishtangal. The special edition included illustrations by C. N. Karunakaran.

== Political alignment ==
S. K. Nair was associated with the Communist Party during his student days and maintained close ties with prominent figures such as E. M. S. Namboodiripad, K. R. Gouri Amma and V. K. Krishna Menon. In 1970, Malayalanadu published a comprehensive election survey for the 1970 Kerala Legislative Assembly election. While foreign periodicals regularly featured such surveys, Malayalanadu's initiative was pioneering in the Indian context. Although the magazine abstained from publishing editorials, it made an exception when Azhikodan Raghavan died in 1972, expressing profound grief and anger over his murder. The 18 June 1978 issue of Malayalanadu featured a compelling article advocating for the reunification of the communist parties. Additionally, the publication of Dharmapuranam, an overtly critical work on the emergency, served as a strong political statement.

== Sister publications ==
In addition to the main magazine, Malayalanadu also published a political weekly (Malayalanadu Rashtreeya Varika), a fortnightly film magazine (Malayalanadu Cinema Dwaivarika) and a women's magazine (Madhuram). S. K. Nair also owned New India Films, which produced notable movies such as Chembarathi (1972), Chayam (1973) and Mazhakkaaru (1973).

Malayalanadu organised awards for excellence in Malayalam literature and cinema. Winners were selected through gallup polls. The inaugural award ceremony took place on 24 May 1970, inaugurated by V. K. Krishna Menon, honouring the best literary works and films of 1969. The recipients included M. T. Vasudevan Nair for the best novel Kaalam, Kadathanat Madhavi Amma for the best poem Kanikkonna, Kakkanadan for the best story Yudhavasanam and N. N. Pillai for the best drama Meherbani. The best film award was presented to Adimakal, Sathyan received the award for best actor for his performance in Kadalpalam, and Sarada was honoured with the best actress award for her role in Mooladhanam.

== Decline ==
After S. K. Nair's death on 16 July 1983, Malayalanadu faced a period of decline. In his later years, Nair encountered financial challenges and incurred debts. Following his death, the magazine continued publication under the management of S. Ramachandran Pillai as the managing editor and S. K. Nair's wife, Prema K. Nair, as the editor. However, the publication struggled to sustain itself due to mounting debts. Consequently, Malayalanadu ceased publication by the end of 1984.
