= Kerala Sahitya Akademi Award for Story =

Annual Indian literary award

The Kerala Sahitya Akademi Award for Story is an award given every year by the Kerala Sahitya Akademi (Kerala Literary Academy) to a Malayalam writer for writing a story of literary merit. It is one of the twelve categories of the Kerala Sahitya Akademi Award.

== Awardees ==
Year	Book	Author	Image
1966	Naalalu Naaluvazhi	Parappurath	
1967	Achingayum Kochuramanum	E. M. Kovur	
1968	Thanuppu	Kamala Surayya	
1969	Mothiram	Karur Neelakanta Pillai	
1970	Presidentinte Adyathe Maranam	N. P. Mohammed	
1971	Jalam	K. P. Nirmal Kumar	
1972	Payasam	Tatapuram Sukumaran	
1973	Muni	Pattathuvila Karunakaran	
1974	Sakshi	T. Padmanabhan	
1975	Malamukalile Abdullah	Punathil Kunjabdulla	
1976	Marichittillathavarude Smarakam	M. Sukumaran	
1977	Sakunam	Kovilan	
1978	Pediswapnangal	Sethu	
1979	Oridathu	Zacharia	
1980	Aswathamavinte Chiri	Kakkanadan	
1981	Veedum Thadavum	Anand	
1982	Neeruravakalkku Oru Geetham	G. N. Panicker	
1983	Vasthuhara	C. V. Sreeraman	
1984	Thrikkottur Peruma	U. A. Khader	
1985	Hridayavathiyaya Penkutty	M. Mukundan	
1986	Swargam Thurakkunna Samayam	M. T. Vasudevan Nair	
1987	Puzha	Vettur Raman Nair	
1988	Dinosurinte Kutty	E. Harikumar	
1989	Noolpalam Kadakkunnavar	Vaisakhan	
1990	Bhoomiputhrante Vazhi	S. V. Venugopan Nair	
1991	Kulambocha	Jayanarayanan	
1992	Veeduvittu Pokunnu	Ashtamoorthi	
1993	Manjilapakshi	Maanasi	
1994	Samantharangal	Shatrughnan	
1995	Higuita	N. S. Madhavan	
1996	Rathrimozhi	N. Prabhakaran	
1997	Aswasathinte Manthra Charadu	Mundoor Krishnankutty	
1998	Oru Rathrikkoru Pakal	Asokan Charuvil	
1999	Reindeer	Chandramathi	
2000	Randu Swapna Darshikal	Gracy	
2001	Khadikarangal Nilaykkunna Samayam	Subhash Chandran	
2002	Karkkidakathile kakkakal	K. A. Sebastian	
2003	Jalasandhi	P. Surendran	
2004	Jagarooka	Priya A. S.	
2005	Thaapam	T. N. Prakash	
2006	Chavukali	E. Santhosh Kumar	
2007	Selected Stories	Shihabuddin Poythumkadavu	
2008	Komaala	Santhosh Echikkanam	
2009	Ave Maria	K. R. Meera	
2010	Parasya Sareeram	E. P. Sreekumar	
2011	Policukarante Penmakkal	U. K. Kumaran	
2012	Peramaram	Satheesh Babu Payyannur	
2013	Marichavar Cinema Kanukayanu	Thomas Joseph	
2014	Bhavanabhedanam	V. R. Sudheesh	
2015	Ashithayude Kathakal	Ashitha	
2016	Adam	S. Hareesh	
2017	Ithara Characharangalude Charitrapusthakam	Aymanam John	
2018	Mananchira	K. Rekha	
2019	Ramachi	Vinoy Thomas	
2020	Vaank	Unni R.	
2021	Vazhi Kandupidikkunnavar	V. M. Devadas	
2022	Muzhakkam	P. F. Mathews	
2023	Udaya Sports and Arts Club	N. Rajan	
2024	Garisappa Aruvi Adhava Oru Jalayatra	V. Shinilal	
