= M. Krishnan Nair (author) =

Indian writer and academic (1923–2006)

- Born: March 3, 1923; Thiruvananthapuram, Kerala, India
- Died: February 23, 2006 (aged 82)
- Occupations: Literary critic, essayist, orator
- Spouse: Vijayamma
- Relatives: V. K. Madhavan Pillai (father); Sarada Amma (mother)
- Writing career
- Language: Malayalam
- Notable awards: 1979 B. D. Goenka Award; 2000 Kerala Sahitya Akademi Award

M. Krishnan Nair (3 March 1923 – 23 February 2006) was an Indian academic, orator, literary journalist and literary critic of Malayalam literature. He was known for his Sahitya Varaphalam, a weekly column he wrote first in Malayalanadu weekly, later in Kalakaumudi and finally in Samakalika Malayalam Vaarika, which introduced world literature to Malayalam readers. He also published several books, including Saundaryathinte Sannidhanathil, Adhunika Malayala Kavitha and Vayanakkara, Ningal Jeevichirikkunno?. He was a recipient of the Kerala Sahitya Akademi Award for Overall Contributions and the B. D. Goenka Award for excellence in literary journalism.

== Biography ==
Krishnan Nair was born in Thiruvananthapuram, the capital city of the south Indian state of Kerala on March 3, 1923 to V. K. Madhavan Pillai and Sarada Amma. He had his school education at Travancore and after graduating with honours from the University College, Thiruvananthapuram in 1945, he joined the government service to serve as a clerk at the Kerala Government Secretariat for the next five years. He resigned from government service in 1950 to join the Government Sanskrit College, Thiruvananthapuram as a lecturer and was transferred to his alma mater, the University College, Thiruvananthapuram in 1969. Later, he served the Government Arts College, Thiruvananthapuram and Victoria College, Palakkad before moving to Maharaja's College, Ernakulam where he served as the head of the department of Malayalam and retired from academic service in 1978 holding the position of a first grade professor.

Nair, a hospitable person to those who knew him, died on February 23, 2006, at the age of 82, at a hospital in Thiruvananthapuram, succumbing to cardiac failure following pneumonia. He was suffering from Parkinson's disease during his last days, but still he continued to write articles. He was survived by his wife Vijayamma and five daughters. K. Venugopal, his only son, died in a bike accident in 1985.

== Literary career ==
I believe bad literature is a crime against society. True talent, a true genius does not depend on encouragement. It transcends all barriers. A truly talented writer cannot be made or marred by criticism, Krishnan Nair's reply on being asked "why was his criticism so sharp and harsh".

Krishnan Nair was known to have been introduced into the world of literature by his father by reading the works of Kunchan Nambiar to him when he was a boy. He was also made to write commentaries on the books he was made to read. His first published work was an article tilted Vimarshanam (Criticism) which appeared in Navajeevan weekly run by C. V. Kunhiraman, a social reformer and journalist who would later found Kerala Kaumudi. His first book, Adunika Malayala Kavitha (Modern Malayalam Poetry), published by P. K. Brothers, was the compilation of the articles he wrote in Kaumudi during his days at the Government Sanskrit College, Thiruvananthapuram. He also published several books, such as Adhunika Malayala Kavitha, M. Krishna Nairude Prabhandangal and Prathibhayude Jwalagni.

=== Sahithya Varaphalam ===
Krishnan Nair is best known as the critic who, after Kesari Balakrishna Pillai, introduced world literature to Malayali reader and his weekly column Sahithya Vaaraphalam, ran for 35 years. He started writing the column in Malayalanadu weekly in 1969 and it ran for a number of years before moving to Kalakaumudi weekly when Malayalanadu closed down and finally to Samakalika Malayalam Vaarika where it stayed until his death in 2006. Though his column was criticised for its alleged superficiality, the column helped a very large section of readers of Kerala to the world of literature from the Latin America, Europe, Africa and Asia. His critique of works by Malayalam authors were said to be impartial irrespective of whether the writer was a novice or an established one; he also used the column to comment upon the society. Nair, himself, did not consider the column as literary criticism, but preferred to call it literary journalism. Sahithya Vaaraphalam has since been compiled as a book and is also available online.

== Awards and honours ==
When the B. D. Goenka Award was instituted in 1979, Krishnan Nair was selected for the honour for excellence in literary journalism. Kerala Sahitya Akademi awarded him their annual honour for overall contributions to him 2000.

== Books by M.Krishnan Nair ==
- M. Krishnan Nair (1972). Adhunika Malayala Kavitha. P. K. Brothers. ISBN 9788126004133.
- M. Krishnan Nair (1984). Ekanthathayude Layam. Prabhath Books.
- M. Krishnan Nair (1985). Magical Realism. Prabhath Books.
- M. Krishnan Nair (1987). Prakashathinu Oru Sthuthigeetham. Prabhath Books.
- M. Krishnan Nair (1987). M. Krishnan Nayarute Prabhandhangal.
- M. Krishnan Nair (1988). Karutha Shalabangal. Prabhath Books.
- M. Krishnan Nair (1990). Manorathangalile Yathrakkar. Prabhath Books.
- M. Krishnan Nair (1991). Athmavinte Dharpanam. Prabhath Books.
- M. Krishnan Nair (1993). Sarathkala Deepthi. Prabhatham Printing and Publishing.
- M. Krishnan Nair (1994). Panineer Puvinte Parimalampole. H & C Books.
- M. Krishnan Nair (1994). Muthukal. Neruda.
- M. Krishnan Nair (1996). Vishwasundhari, Vruddhrathi. Imprint.
- M. Krishnan Nair (1997). Vayanakkara, Ningal Jeevichirikkunno. DC Books.
- M. Krishnan Nair (1999). Kalasankalppangal. MaluBen Publications.
- M. Krishnan Nair (1999). Sahithya Varaphalam. Current Books.
- M. Krishnan Nair (2007). Soundharyathinte Sannidhanathil. H and C Books.
- M. Krishnan Nair. Mohabhangangal. Olive Publications.
- M. Krishnan Nair. Oru Shabdathil Oru Ragam.

=== Edited works ===
- M. Krishnan Nair, ed. (2007). Malayalathinte Suvarnakathakal. Green Books. ISBN 979-8184230634.
- M. Krishnan Nair, ed. (2008). Thirenjedutha Malayalakathakal. Green Books. ASIN B007E5FZ04.
