= Manasi =

Manasi may refer to:

- Manasi (film), a 1981 romantic comedy Oriya film
- Manasi (poetry collection), an 1890 poetry book by Rabindranath Tagore
- Maanasi or Manasi, Indian Malayalam language short story writer
