= Center for International Relations =

American nonprofit organization centered on international affairs

- Formation: 2002
- Headquarters: Arlington, Virginia, USA
- Website: https://centerinternationalrelations.org/

The Center for International Relations (CIR) is a nonpartisan and nonprofit, tax exempt 501(c)(3) organization that publishes various materials about international relations and current affairs. The organization is based in the Washington, D.C. area, though its staff operates in various countries throughout the world.

== Activities ==
The CIR's core activities include publication of its online journal, publication of special reports, hosting special events and awarding annual prizes for outstanding essays submitted by students.

== Outlets ==
=== International Affairs Forum ===
The International Affairs Forum is CIR's online journal, which publishes articles, opinion pieces and interviews. It also maintains databases of organizations, blogs and institutions active in the sphere of international relations and economic policy studies. The forum's stated mission is to present ‘information in an unbiased manner, regardless of political creed to provide our readers an all-encompassing view of subjects’ as well as to present ‘content from a global perspective.’

=== Cultural Affairs Forum ===
The Cultural Affairs Forum is the sister site of the International Affairs Forum and covers ‘cultural diplomacy’. It publishes articles, editorials and links, in this case on topics such as classical music and politics, and culture as propaganda.

== Boards ==
=== Board of directors ===
- John J. Tierney, Jr., Former executive director of the Congressional Caucus on National Defense, U.S. House of Representatives; faculty chairman, The Institute of World Politics
- James Stockmal, director, BearingPoint
- Dimitri Neos, executive director, Center for International Relations

=== Editorial board ===
- Steven Clemons, New America Foundation
- Ross H. Munro, Center for Security Studies
- Robert R. Reilly, former director Voice of America

=== Resource board ===
- Terrence R. Guay, professor of international business, Pennsylvania State University
- Muhiuddin Haider, associate professor, Department of Global Health & International Affairs, George Washington University
- John C. King, adjunct professor of international affairs, American University (Washington, D.C.)
- Christos N. Kyrou, assistant professor, School of International Service (SIS) at American University; director of the Environmental Peacemaking Program at the Center for International Development and Conflict Management at the University of Maryland, College Park
- Ghada Gomaa A. Mohamed, lecturer in economics, Carleton University (Canada)
- Sahar Khamis, assistant professor of communications, Affiliate Faculty of Women's Studies, and Affiliate Faculty in the Consortium on Race, Gender and Ethnicity, University of Maryland
- Madhav Das Nalapat, UNESCO Peace Chair and director of the Department of Geopolitics at Manipal University
