= Balyakala Smaranakal =

1987 book by Kamala Surayya

- Author: Kamala Surayya
- Original title: ബാല്യകാല സ്മരണകൾ
- Language: Malayalam
- Publisher: DC Books (1987–present)
- Publication date: 1987
- Publication place: India

Balyakala Smaranakal (Childhood memories) is 1987 autobiographical book written by Kamala Surayya (Madhavikutty). The book discusses Madhavikutty's residences in Nalappattu in Punnayurkulam and Landan Road in Kolkata, and the people she met there, as well as her experiences. She brings out her feminist vision through the child character. Balyakala Smaranakal is one of Madhavikutty's three major novels. The book's characters were drawn as paintings and displayed in the Kozhikode exhibition in 2019.
