= Nalapat Narayana Menon =

Indian writer (1887–1954)

- Portrait of Nalapat Narayana Menon
- Born: 7 October 1887; Punnayurkulam, Ponnani taluk, Malabar District, Madras Presidency, British Raj
- Died: 31 October 1954 (aged 67)
- Writing career
- Language: Malayalam
- Genres: Poem, play, translation
- Notable works: Paavangal, Kannuneerthulli

Nalapat Narayana Menon (7 October 1887 – 31 October 1954) was a Malayalam language author from Kerala state, South India. His oeuvre consists of poems, plays and translations. His best known works include Paavangal, a translation of Victor Hugo's Les Misérables, and the elegy Kannuneerthulli.

== Early life ==
He was born in Punnayurkulam, Ponnani taluk in South Malabar on 7 October 1887. Narayana Menon got his family name, Nalapat, through matrilineal succession. He obtained English education from Kunnamkulam, Trichur and Calicut. While he was 18, he met poet Vallathol and became his chief companion. His complete History was documented by Saritha Asokan Nalapat in 2016 (Granddaughter of Nalapat Balamani amma's sister Nalapat Ammini amma). Documentary name is "Hrishkavi"(The ascetic poet)

== Literary career ==
Vallathol's influence is obvious in his early poems. He was also influenced by Robert G. Ingersoll and was an atheist for most of his youth. Later he developed strong interest in Indian philosophy and religion and was influenced by the ideas of Dayananda Saraswati and Swami Vivekananda. Most of his early prose works were on subjects related to Indian philosophy. His most famous poem Kannuneerthulli (Tear Drop) was an elegy written after the death of his wife. Paavangal, a translation of Victor Hugo's Les Misérables, was a milestone in the history of Malayalam literature and it set off a social reformation of sorts in Kerala. Despite being a translation, it gifted Malayalam a new prose style. Literary critic M. Leelavathy notes: "The translation was an extraordinary phenomenon as it prepared the ground for the Communist movement to take roots in Kerala. With its philosophy of human equality, the heart-wrenching tale of the oppressed left a profound impact in our society. For E.M.S. Namboodiripad, this was Nalapatan's best work. Its influence was both sociological and philological."

== Personal life ==
Nalapat was the uncle of poet Balamani Amma and the grand uncle of renowned writer Kamala Surayya (Madhavikutty or Kamala Das) and Dr. Suvarna Nalapat, writer and music therapy researcher. He is fondly referred to as Valiyammavan by Madhavikutty in her books such as Neermathalam Pootha Kaalam. Lokantharangalil was an elegy by Balamani Amma on the death of Nalapat Narayana Menon.

== Works ==
=== Poetry ===
- Kannuneerthulli
- Chakravalam
- Daivagathi Ottanthullal
- Nalappattinte Padyakrithikal
- Pulakankuram
- Pukayila Mahatmyam Kilippattu
- Lokam
- Sulochana

=== Play ===
- Sapatnyam
- Veshu Ammayude Vishari

=== Others ===
- Arshajnanam
- Gurusannidhi
- Dayananda Saraswati
- Valmiki Prashnam
- Vallathol Narayana Menon
- Nimitha Sastram
- Rathi Samrajyam
- Paavangal (Translation of Les Misérables)
- Pourasthyadeepam (Translation)
