= Orkkuka Vallappozhum =

- Directed by: Sohanlal
- Written by: Sohanlal
- Produced by: Vinu Y.S.
- Starring: Thilakan; Jagadish; Krishnachandran; Shilpa Bala; Meera Vasudev Vinu.y.s
- Cinematography: M. J. Radhakrishnan
- Music by: Songs: M. Jayachandran; Lyrics: Vayalar Ramavarma; P. Bhaskaran; Gireesh Puthenchery
- Production company: God's own Moviz
- Distributed by: Celebrate Films
- Release date: 9 January 2009
- Running time: 120 minutes
- Country: India
- Language: Malayalam

Orkkuka Vallappozhum (Remember Once A while) is a Malayalam movie released in 2009. This 120-minute feature film has Thilakan as Sethumadhavan - a seventy-year-old enjoying his retired life and trying to rediscover the innocence of his past. It marks the return of actor Krishnachandran after an absence of 23 years.

== Plot ==
Sethumadhavan is left alone following the death of his wife and the migration of his only son and his family to a foreign nation. With nothing much to do the old man takes a fifteen-hour drive to an old bungalow in the high ranges where he had spent his childhood and adolescent times, studying in the British school nearby. While walking through the nostalgic steps, ignoring the hardships of his age, Sethumadhavan also remembers Paru, his schoolmate with whom he had spent some important stages of his life.

Sethumadhavan collects details about Paru from the localities but is finally disheartened to hear about the sad fate that embraced her. Totally shattered, the old man then decides to take a different route, which may instill the lost happiness to his life. The loneliness that he experiences in his life, on account of the death of his wife and also on account of his son being far away, in a foreign land, makes him seek refuge in the memories of the past.

== Cast ==
- Thilakan as Sethumadhavan
  - Rejith Menon as Teen Sethu (voiceover by Sarath Das)
    - Master Dhananjay as Child Sethu
- Jagadish
- Krishnachandran
- Chali Pala
- Shilpa Bala as Devayani (Paru) (voiceover by Devi S.)
- Bindu Varappuzha
- Meera Vasudevan

== Songs ==
1. "Orkkuka Vallappozhum"
2. "Mambooppadam"
3. "Etho January Massam"
4. "Aa Raavil"
5. "Enthinaamizhi"
6. "Thamarapookkalum"
7. "Etho January F"
