= Thanuppu =

Short story written by Madhavikutty

- Author: Kamala Surayya
- Original title: തണുപ്പ്
- Language: Malayalam
- Publisher: Current Books
- Publication date: 1967
- Publication place: India
- Awards: Kerala Sahitya Akademi Award for Story (1968)

Thanuppu (Cold) is a short story written by Madhavikutty. It won the Kerala Sahitya Akademi award for short stories in 1968.
