= Ente Katha =

1973 autobiography by Kamala Surayya

Ente Katha (My Story)
- Author: Madhavikutty
- Original title: എന്റെ കഥ
- Language: Malayalam
- Publisher: Current Books (1973–1982); DC Books (1982–present)
- Publication date: 1 February 1973
- Publication place: India
- Pages: 107
- ISBN: 81-7130-059-6

Ente Katha (My Story) is an autobiography written by Madhavikutty (Kamala Surayya) in the year 1973. She was motivated to write this as she became ill and thought will not survive. The book was controversial and outspoken and had her critics gunning her after it was published in 1973; often shocking her readers with her for conventions and expression of her opinions on subjects in society- more often on the hypocrisy of it. Though My Story was supposed to be an autobiography, Madhavikutty later admitted that there was plenty of fiction in it.

Madhavikutty herself translated the book into English, titled My Story.

== Plot summary ==
This book is about Aami (Kamala), starting from her childhood and her village. It also depicts her teenage love towards a neighbour of the same age. Her childhood in colonised Calcutta is also explained vividly. Her failed marriage, the birth of her children and her extramarital affairs are addressed in this work. She moved away from social conventions and portrayed homosexuality as well.

== Publication ==
Ente Katha was serialised in 1972 in the now defunct Malayalanadu weekly, a literary magazine published by S. K. Nair. The novel not only created a literary sensation but even invited the wrath of Madhavikutty's close relatives who wanted to stop its publication. V. B. C. Nair, the Editor of Malayalanadu recalls, "Despite pressure from her influential relatives to stop the publication of the work, Kamala remained bold and it proved a roaring hit boosting the circulation of the weekly by 50,000 copies within a fortnight." It was published as a book by Current Books in 1973 February.
