= Shihabuddin Poythumkadavu =

Indian writer (born 1963)

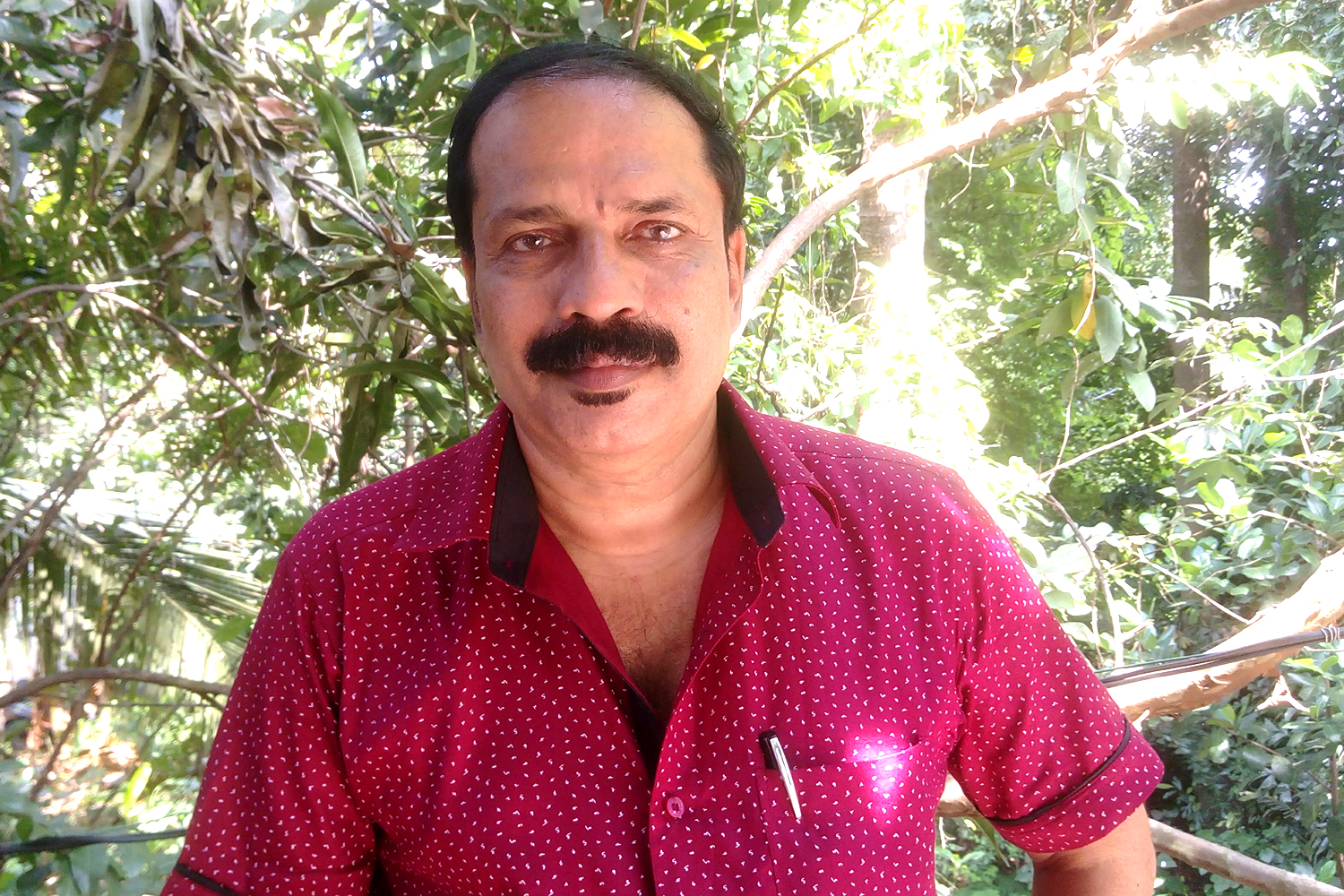
- Shihabuddin Poythumkadavu
- Born: Thoniyan Puthiyapurayil Shihabuddin; 29 October 1963; Kannur, Kerala, India
- Education: Brennen College, Thalassery
- Occupations: Writer, screenwriter, novelist, poet, journalist
- Years active: 1980 – present
- Spouse: Najma M. K.
- Awards: Kerala Sahitya Akademi Award for Story (2007)

Thoniyan Puthiyapurayil Shihabuddin, better known as Shihabuddin Poythumkadavu or Shihabuddin Poithumkadavu ,(born 29 October 1963) is an Indian writer, journalist, poet, orator and television personality.

== Life ==
Shihabuddin Poythumkadavu was born on 29 October 1963 at Poythumkadavu near Valapattanam in Kannur district, Kerala. He is married to Najma, now working in a Government Higher Secondary School near Pattambi as an English teacher, and the couple has 4 children. He has resided in Kunnamkulam, Thrissur district since 2000.

== Short story collections ==
- Aarkkum Vendatha Oru Kannu
- Ee Stationil Ottakku-the first fantasy short story collection in Malayalam language
- Thala
- Kathunna Thalayana
- Randu Eleppamar
- Manjukaalam
- Malabar Express
- Shihabuddinte Kathakal
- Thiranjedutha Kathakal- Selected Short Stories
- Katilekku Pookalle Kunje
- Oru Paattinte Dooram
- Eesayum KP Ummarum
- Thurumbu Mullaniyude Hridayam.

== Novels ==
- Eercha
- Aalivaidyan
- Shihabudheen Poithumkadavinte Novellakal
- Nalla Ayalkkaran

== Poems ==
- Nootandukalayi Kathuvachathu
- Kadalmarubhumiyile Veedu
- Ajnjathayude kannukal (English, French, Malayalam trilingual edition)
- Shihabudheente Kavithakal

== Essays / Memoirs ==
- Kathapathram Veettumuttathu
- jeevaparyantham
- Marujeevitham

== Book on the author ==
- Kadhayude Jalashyam -Written by TM Ramachandran

== Translated works ==
- Yarrikkum Vendatha Kan -Translated by KV Shylaja
- Do not go to the jungle - Translated by Dr.J. Devika

== Screen Play ==
- Kasavu TV Serial directed by P. N. Menon (director)
- Bhumiyude Uppu Co- writer with Sunny Joseph

== As director ==
- Khabar Tele Film
- Aalmarattam Tele Film

== Awards ==
- 1996: V. T. Bhattathiripad Award – Manjukaalam
- 2007: Kerala Sahitya Akademi Award – Thiranjedutha Kathakal
- 2007: Padmarajan Award – Taj Mahalile Ravukal
- State Bank of Travancore Award – Kathunna Thalayana
- Ankanam Award
- Abu Dhabi Sakthi Award
- Kala Award
- Abu Dhabi Malayali Samajam Award
- Ayanam Award
