= Kakkanadan =

Indian Malayalam-language writer (1935–2011)

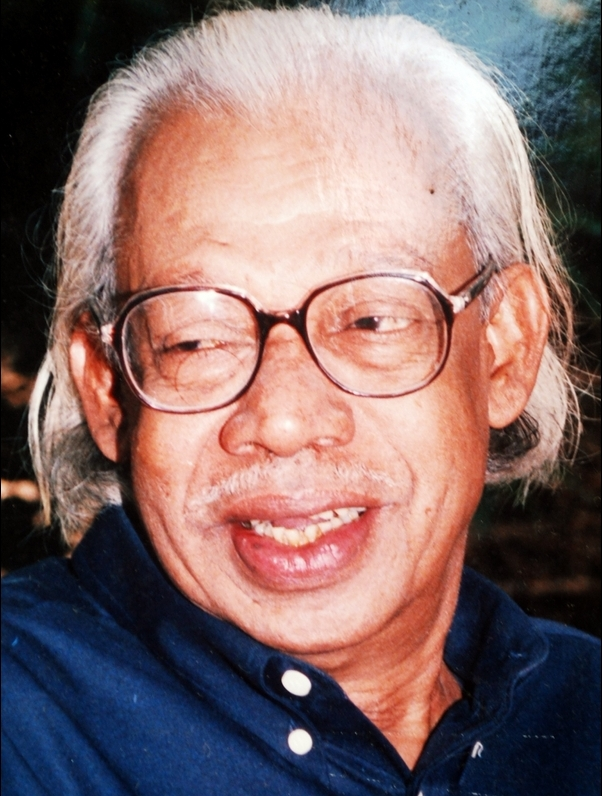
- Kakkanadan
- Born: 23 April 1935; Thiruvalla, Travancore (now in Kerala, India)
- Died: 19 October 2011 (aged 76); Kollam, Kerala, India
- Occupation: Writer
- Writing career
- Genres: Novel, short story
- Notable awards: 1980 Kerala Sahitya Akademi Award for Story; 1984 Kerala Sahitya Akademi Award for Novel; 1996 Muttathu Varkey Award; 2003 Kerala Sahitya Akademi Award for Overall Contributions; 2005 Kendra Sahitya Akademi Award; 2008 Balamaniamma Award
- Movement: Modernism

George Varghese Kakkanadan (23 April 1935 – 19 October 2011), commonly known as Kakkanadan, was an Indian short-story writer and novelist in the Malayalam language. His works broke away from the neo-realism that dominated Malayalam literature through the 1950s and 1960s. He is often credited with laying the foundation of modernism in Malayalam literature. He is a recipient of Kendra Sahitya Akademi Award and Kerala Sahitya Akademi Awards in addition to numerous other awards and recognitions.

== Life ==
=== Early years ===
Born in Thiruvalla as the second son of evangelist George Kakkanadan and Rosamma, G. Varghese Kakkanadan spent most of his childhood at Kollam and Kottarakkara. Though Kakkanadan's father was closely associated with the church, he was a political -left sympathiser. Their house in Kottarakkara was a refuge for prominent communist leaders of the past, who were forced to go hiding. After completing a degree in chemistry at SN College, Kollam, Kakkanadan started his career as a school teacher in Kerala. He quit the job to join the Southern Railway in Tamil Nadu in 1957. In 1961 he moved to the Ministry of Indian Railways in New Delhi where he worked until 1967. He went to Germany in 1967 on a scholarship to pursue research in literature but abandoned it midway and returned to Kerala to become a full-time writer. Kakkanadan also worked as an editorial member in S. K. Nair's Malayalanadu weekly published from Kollam, between 1971 and 1973.

=== Family ===
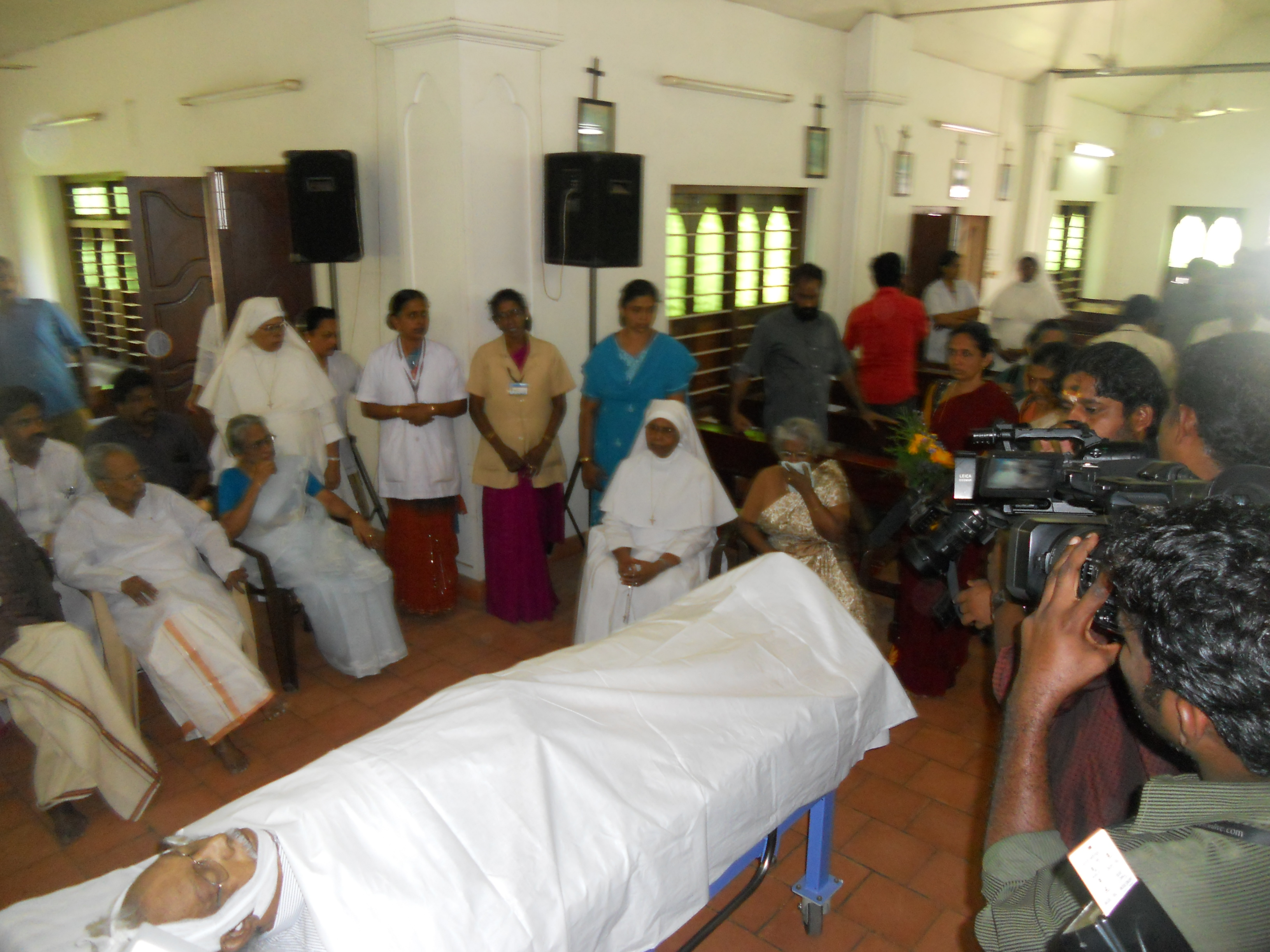
Kakkanadan's body kept at Bishop Benziger Hospital, Kollam

Artist Rajan Kakkanadan and writers Thampi Kakkanadan and G. Ignatius Kakkanadan are his brothers. Ignatius, his elder brother, was a journalist and was an editorial board member of Janayugom and Malayalam magazine Soviet Nadu. He was also a noted translator and had translated the works of B. R. Ambedkar and Amartya Sen under a Kerala Bhasha Institute Project. Kakkanadan's younger brother, Thampi, was also a writer who authored several short stories and published a novel- Kalapathinte Orma. Kakkanadan also has two sisters: Ammini, wife of the former Member of Parliament P. A. Solomon, and Annie. Kakkanadan married Ammini in 1965. They have three children: Radha, Rajan Kakkanadan and Rishi.

=== Death ===
Kakkanadan died on 19 October 2011, aged 76, at Bishop Benziger's hospital in Kollam. He had had cancer for a few years. He was buried with full state honours at the Polayathode public crematorium complex. He is survived by his two sons, Rajan and Rishi, and daughter Radha. His wife Ammini died on 15 September 2019.

== Writing ==
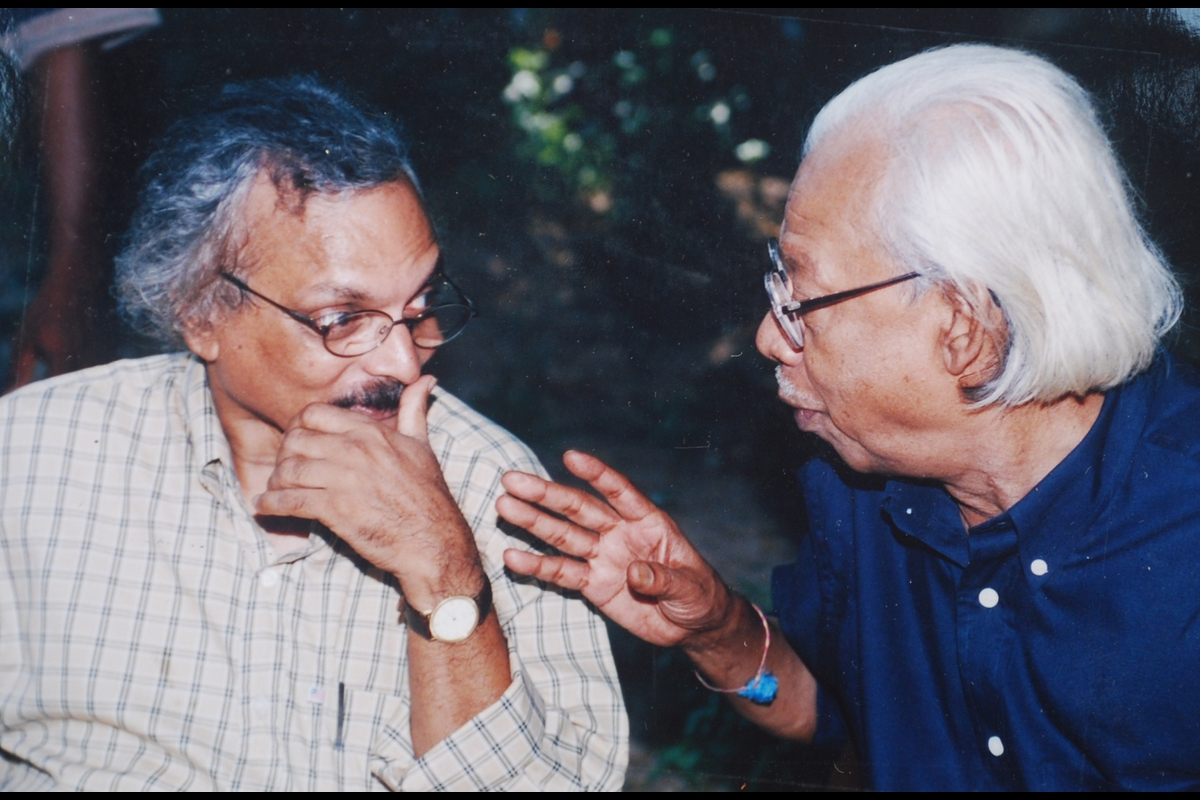
Kakkanadan with M. Mukundan

Though he had started writing much before the railway stint and even wrote the novel Vasoori, it was his second novel Sakshi that brought him laurels. The book had a great impact on the younger generation of Malayalam readers and was credited with breaking new grounds in Malayalam literature. In early 1960s, he shot into prominence as one of the most promising writers in Malayalam and was among the pioneers of the modernist trend in Malayalam literature. Kakkanadan's early works broke new ground in Malayalam fiction on account of their earnest exploration of deeper realities of life by employing a new diction and narrative methods. Though vast majority of readers initially found it hard to accept the modern trends ushered in by Kakkanadan and some of his contemporaries, their works soon created a new sensibility marking a radical break from the past.

He was one of the harbingers of modernism in the genres of Malayalam novel and short story. Though labelled by his readers as a formidable ultramodern Malayalam writer, Kakkanadan himself was of the view that modernism in literature has no convincing rationale. Several of his works are considered landmarks in the history of literary modernism in Malayalam. Moving with ease from apocalyptic visions to tantric imagery, he made his works representative of an important strand in the larger modernist trends in arts, literature and culture in India.

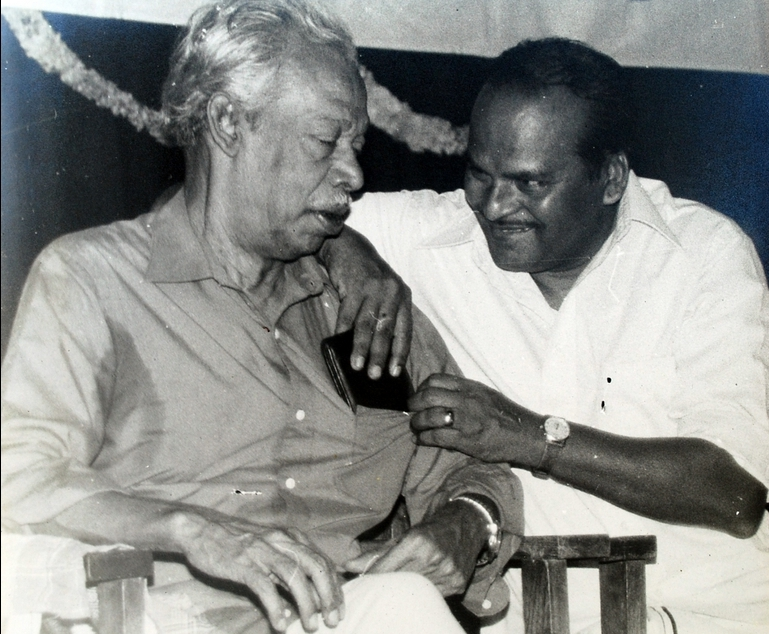
Kakkanadan with Perumbadavam Sreedharan

Kakkanadan was a rebel, both in life and literature. His rebellion extended from his selection of themes and use of subversive language to his careful crafting of the philosophy of angst into the writing. He often traversed the sweat zones of life and spoke of the valleys of the unknowing. With a stunningly violent style, he shook the very roots of the progressive literary sensibilities of the 1960s and 1970s and its innocent certainties. His was a world of dark tones and darker people, many of them social rejects. He often spoke of the seamy side, the world of puss and blood. Each of his works was an act of rebellion against accepted elitist social mores and codes. Sex, like violence, was a leitmotif in many of his works; at times as a resonant chant, at others as an explosive outpouring of raw human power that transcends both the demonic and the divine. Kakkanadan's major novels are Sakshi (1967), Ezham Mudra (1968), Vasoori (1968), Ushnamekhala (1969), Kozhi (1971), Parankimala (1971), Ajnathayude Thaazhvara (1972), Innaleyude Nizhal (1974), Adiyaravu (1975), Orotha (1982), Ee Naaykkalute Lokam (1983) and Barsaathi (1986). His most noted short story collections are Yuddhaavasaanam (1969), Purathekkulla Vazhi (1970), Aswathamaavinte Chiri (1979), Sreechakram (1981), Alwar Thirunagarile Pannikal (1989), Uchayillaatha Oru Divasam (1989) and Jaappaana Pukayila (2005). He has other novels, short story collections, travelogues and essay collections to his credit. Director Bharathan adapted the novels Parankimala and Adiyaravu for the films Parankimala (1981) and Parvathy (1981). K. G. George's Onappudava (1978) was based on Kakkanadan's novel of the same name. Kakkanadan's short story Chithalukal was made into a film by Kamal, titled Unnikrishnante Adyathe Christmas (1988).

He won the Kerala Sahitya Akademi Award for his short-story collection Aswathamavinte Chiri in 1980 and for his novel Orotha in 1984. In 2005 he won the Kendra Sahitya Akademi Award for Jappana Pukayila and in 2008 he was bestowed with the Kerala Sahitya Akademi Fellowship. Kakkanadan was a craze among the younger generation of Kerala during the 1960s and 1970s.

== Awards and honours ==
- 1970: Malayalanadu Award – Yuddhaavasaanam
- 1980: Kerala Sahitya Akademi Award for Story – Aswathamavinte Chiri
- 1984: Kerala Sahitya Akademi Award for Novel – Orotha
- 1990: Viswadeepam Award – Alwar Thirunagarile Pannikal
- 1992: Indian Association Sharjah Award
- 1994: Award by Kerala Writers Forum
- 1996: Muttathu Varkey Award
- 2001: Padma Prabha Award
- 2003: Kerala Sahitya Akademi Award for Overall Contributions (Lifetime Achievement)
- 2005: Kendra Sahitya Akademi Award (Short stories) – Jappana Pukayila
- 2008: Balamaniamma Award
- 2009: Bahrain Keraleeya Samajam Sahitya Award

== Bibliography ==
=== Novels ===
- Sakshi (1967)
- Ezham Mudra (1968)
- Vasoori (1968)
- Ushnamekhala (1969)
- Kozhi (1971)
- Parankimala (1971)
- Ajnathayude Thaazhvara (1972)
- Innaleyude Nizhal (1974)
- Aarudeyo Oru Nagaram (1974)
- Adiyaravu (1975)
- Thulavarsham (1975)
- Abhimanyu (1976)
- Theerangalil Udayam (1976)
- Adarnnu Veezhunna Nakshatrangal (1978)
- Ente Nagaram Oru Samarakatha, Mattoru Mukham (1980)
- Verukal Illathavan (1980)
- Orotha (1982)
- Ee Naaykkalute Lokam (1983)
- Kochappu Chila Ormakkurippukal (1985)
- Barsaathi (1986)
- Oru Viddiyude Charithram (1987)
- Nayattu (2 Novels, 1988)
- Chumar Chitrangal (1988)
- Kadalinte Moham (1988)
- Kaveriyude Vili (1988)
- Ivide Ee Theerathu (1990)
- Andrews Enna Paapi (3 Novelettes, 1991)
- Kambolam
- Kakkanadante Lakhu Novelukal
- Pralayathinu Sesham
- Randam Piravi
- Hill Station
- Ammakku Swantham
- Mazha Nizhal Pradesam
- Colossus

=== Short-stories ===
- Kachavadam (1963)
- Kannadi Veedu (1966)
- Pathinezhu (1967)
- Yuddhaavasaanam (1969)
- Purathekkulla Vazhi (1970)
- Aswathamaavinte Chiri (1979)
- Sreechakram (1981)
- Kakkanadante Kathakal (1984)
- Alwar Thirunagarile Pannikal (1989)
- Uchayillaatha Oru Divasam (1989)
- Mazhayude Jwalakal (1989)
- Arulappadu (1993)
- Jaappaana Pukayila (2005)
- Baltimorile Amma
- Yusuf Saraile Charakku Vyapari
- Kaalappazhakkam

=== Travelogues ===
- Kutajadriyude Sangeetam (1989, travelogue)
- Kulir, Venal, Mazha (1992, travelogue)

=== Memoirs ===
- Gallery, Yathrakkidayil (in Malayalanadu Political Weekly)
- Kakkanadante Page (in Malayalanadu Weekly)

== Film adaptations ==
- Onappudava' (1978)
- Parankimala (1981)
- Parvathy (1981)
- Unnikrishnante Adyathe Christmas (1988)
- Parankimala (2014)
