= Neermaathalathinte Pookkal =

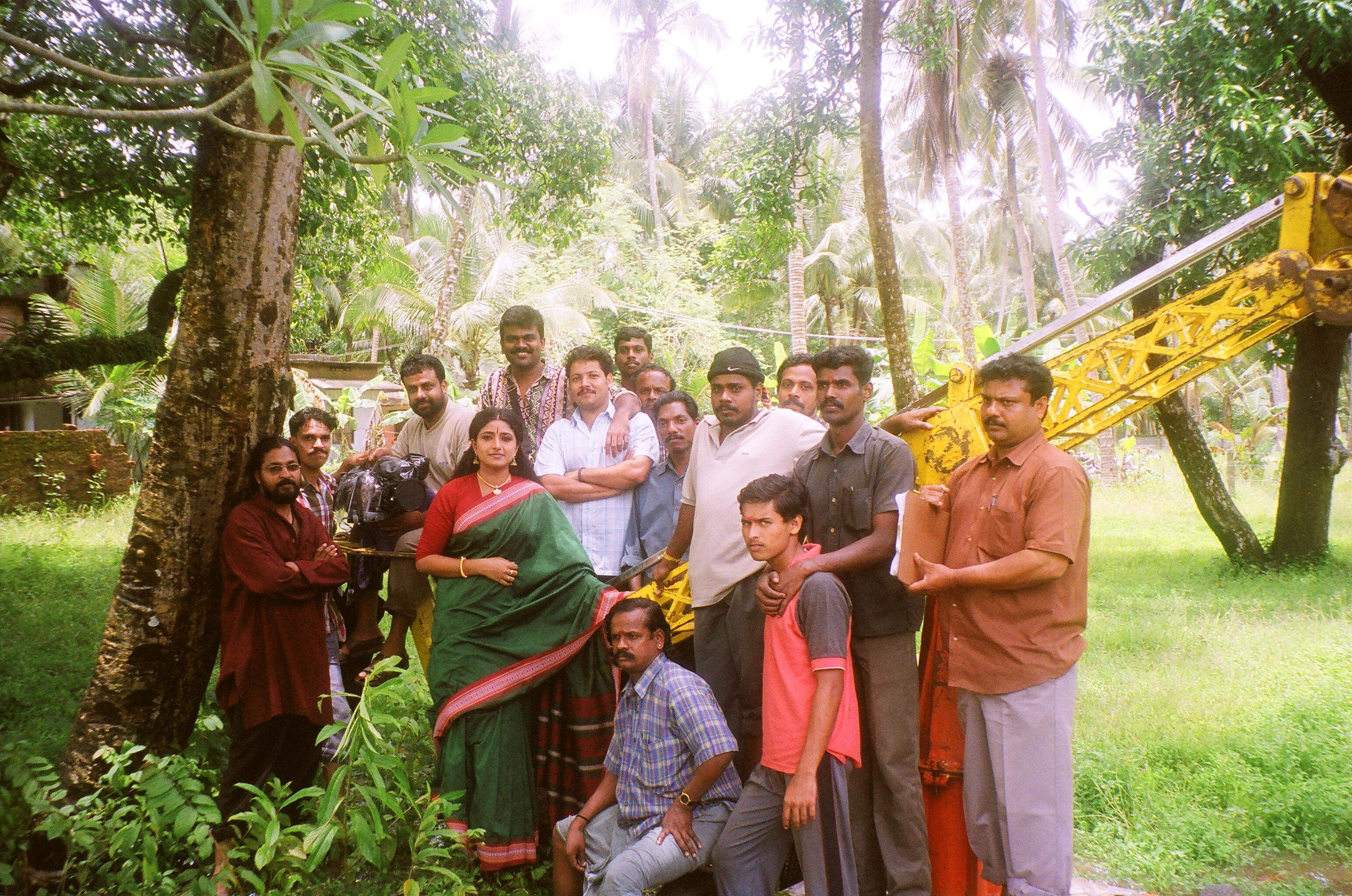
- Making of Flowers of Neermaathalam
- Also known as: Flowers of Neermaathalam
- Screenplay by: Sohanlal; Sreevaraham Balakrishnan
- Story by: Madhavikutty
- Directed by: Sohanlal
- Starring: Praveena; Kishore Satya; Baby Gowri
- Music by: Pandit Ramesh Narayan

Production
- Producer: Amrita TV
- Cinematography: Udayan Ambady

Original release
- Release: 2006

Neermaathalathinte Pookkal (English title: Flowers of Neermaathalam) is a Kerala State award-winning 2006 Indian Malayalam-language television film directed by Sohanlal based on a story written by Madhavikutty (Kamala Das).

== Team ==
- Direction - Sohanlal
- Producer of the film - Amrita Television Channel
- Story: Based on famous artist - Madhavikutty ( Kamala Das ).
- Screenplay: Sohanlal & Sreevraham Balakrishnan
- Music : Pandit Ramesh Narayan
- Cinematography : Udayan Ambadi
- Editor : Sasi Menon
- Art : Rishi
- Audiography : C.R.Chandran

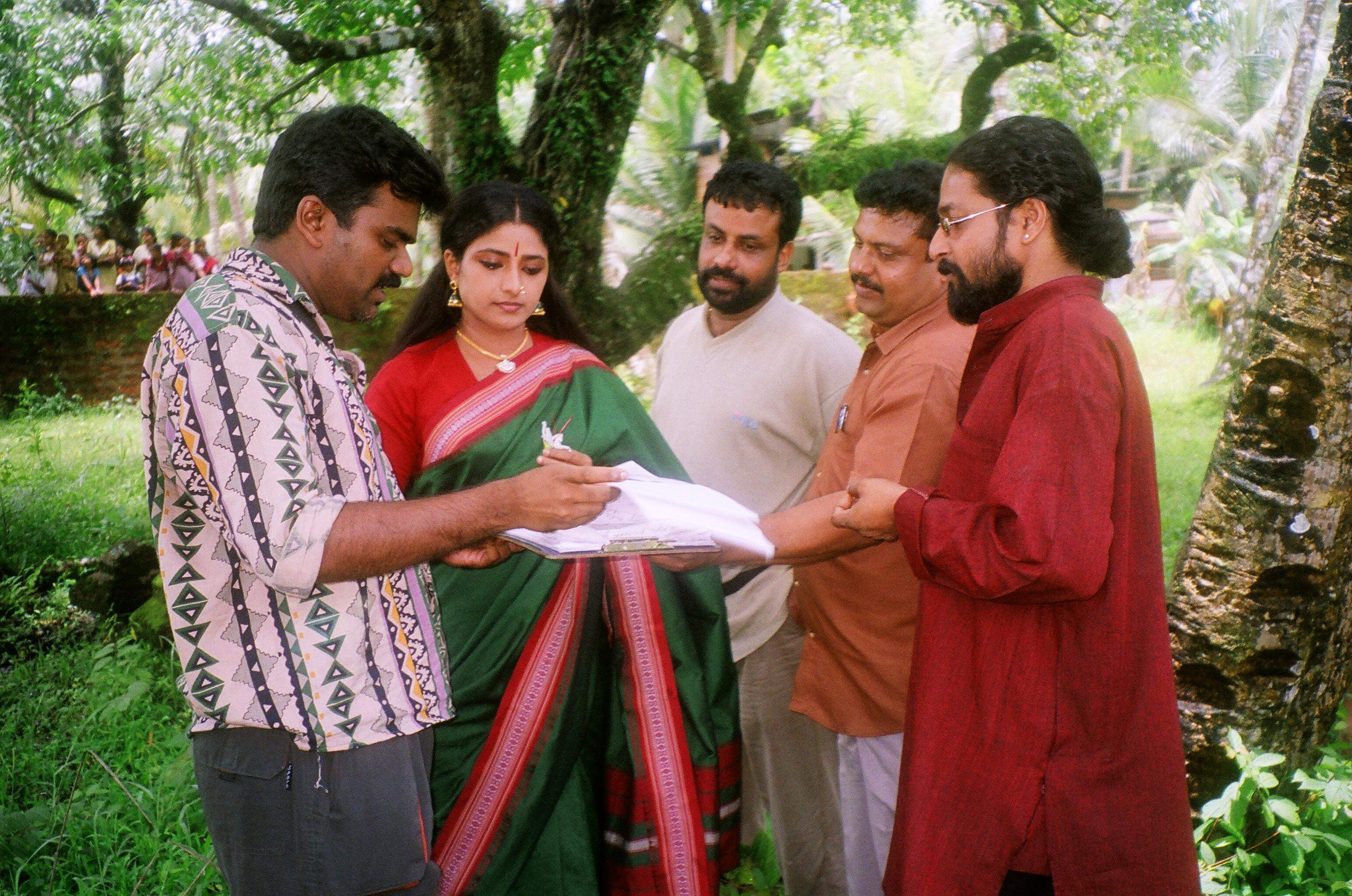
Making
