= Karoor Neelakanta Pillai =

Indian writer (1898 - 1975)

- Born: 22 February 1898; Ettumanoor, Travancore
- Died: 30 September 1975 (aged 77)
- Occupations: Writer, teacher
- Writing career
- Pen name: Karoor
- Genres: Short story, children's literature, novel
- Subject: Social
- Notable awards: Kerala Sahitya Akademi Award (1960, 1969)

Karoor Neelakanta Pillai (22 February 1898 – 30 September 1975) was an Indian writer of Malayalam literature and one of the founders of Sahithya Pravarthaka Co-operative Society (Writers' Co-operative Society). Some of his works such as Poovan Pazham and Marappavakal are counted by many among the best short stories in Malayalam. He was a recipient of the Kerala Sahitya Akademi Award for Children's Literature in 1960, which he received for his work Anakkaran, and the Kerala Sahitya Akademi Award for Story in 1969, which he received for his short story Mothiram.

== Life and career ==
Karoor Neelakanta Pillai was born on February 22, 1898, in Ettumanoor, in Kottayam district of the south Indian state of Kerala to Kunhiliyamma and Neelakanta Pillai. (Note: Karoor was the family name of his mother, obtained through matrilineal succession) His formal education lasted only up to 7th standard though he was known to have been good at studies. He began his career as a school teacher at a local school in Kadappoor but quit his job when he got a government job as a teacher at the local school in Pothanikkad. While on job at various places such as Ettumanoor, Vemballi and Kanakkari, he pursued his studies and passed 9th standard in 1913 as well as the teachers' training examinations.

Pillai became associated with the Adhyapaka Maha Sabha (teachers' union) in 1920 and two years later, he was elected as its secretary. He was involved in the teachers' meeting that discussed strike and though the matter was voted out by the meeting, the government dismissed all teachers who participated in the meeting; Pillai also lost his job. He worked as an assistant to a local ayurvedic physician at Ettumanoor till he was reinstated in his job by the government, with a posting at Namakkuzhi school. After holding the post for a while, he took long leave from job and became the secretary of Kottayam Co-operative Union. Moving to the village of Panmana, he started trading in coir products and it was in 1930, he married Bhavaniyamma. When the coir industry went through a lean period during the World War II, he quit trading and returned to teaching, this time at the local school in Thazhava village.

It was during this time, Pillai, along with M. P. Paul, worked towards forming a co-operative for writers and in 1945, with a capital of ₹ 120, they registered the Sahithya Pravarthaka Sahakarana Sangham (SPCS - Writers' Cooperative Society) with Paul and Pillai as the president and the secretary of the society, respectively. He held the position of the secretary for two decades and when he relinquished the position in 1965, the society had already made a mark in the publishing sector, with the integration of National Book Stall in 1949.

He died in September 30, 1975, at the age of 77.

== Bibliography ==
Pillai, Vaikom Muhammad Basheer and Uroob are considered to be the preeminent storytellers in Malayalam literature. His short stories often portray the plight of the middle class in a simple and straightforward manner. Many of his stories were translated into other Indian languages and English. The short story Anakkaran (The Mahout) was translated into English by Santa Ramesvara Rao. He wrote many stories for children and his story Anchu Kadalasu was later adapted for a film of the same name. He received the Kerala Sahitya Akademi Award for Children's Literature in 1960 for Anakkaran and the Kerala Sahitya Akademi Award for Story in 1969 for Mothiram.

The following is a list of works published by Karoor Neelakanta Pillai.

=== Short stories ===
Year	Title	Title in English	Publisher	Notes
1945	Karoor Kathakal	Stories by Karoor	National Book Depot, Kottayam	Collection of 8 stories With an introduction by M. V. Paul
1945	Melvilasom	The Address	N.B.S., Kottayam	Collection of 8 stories
1946	Kochanujathi	The Little Sister	Mangalodayam, Trichur	Collection of 8 stories
1946	Smarakam	A Memorial	Vellinezhi, Palghat	Collection of 8 stories
1947	Astrologer	Astrologer	N.B.S., Kottayam	Collection of 9 stories
1947	Iruttil	In the Darkness	Mangalodayam, Trichur	Collection of 8 stories
1948	Thuppukaran	The Sweeper	Mangalodayam, Trichur	Collection of 9 stories
1949	Grihanayika	The Lady of the House	S.P.C.S., Kottayam*	Collection of 8 stories
1949	Poovan Pazham	Poovan Banana	N.B.S., Kottayam	Collection of 10 stories
1950	Meenkari	The Fisherwoman	N.B.S., Kottayam	Collection of 8 stories
1951	Tekkupattu		N.B.S., Kottayam	Collection of 10 stories
1952	Katha Kouthukam		N.B.S., Kottayam	Collection of 8 stories
1952	Oru Pidi Mannu	A Fistful of Earth	N.B.S., Kottayam*	Collection of 9 stories
1954	Karayikkunna Chiri		N.B.S., Kottayam	Collection of 10 stories
1955	Ambalaparambil	In the Temple Courtyard	N.B.S., Kottayam	Collection of 13 stories
1959	Pisachinte Kuppayam	The Devil's Attire	S.P.C.S., Kottayam	
1963	Marappavakal	The Wooden Dolls	S.P.C.S., Kottayam	Collection of 8 stories
1965	Tiranjedutha Kathakal	Selected Stories	S.P.C.S., Kottayam	Collection of 51 stories With an introduction by G. Kumara Pillai
1966	Pathu Kathakal	Ten Stories	S.P.C.S., Kottayam	Collection of 10 stories
1968	Mothiram	The Ring	S.P.C.S., Kottayam	Collection of 8 stories
1970	Ee Sahayathil Charadund	A Sting is Attached to this Help	S.P.C.S., Kottayam	Collection of 11 stories With an introduction by N. V. Krishna Warrier
1970	Tiranjedutha Kathakal II	Selected Stories	S.P.C.S., Kottayam	Collections of 47 stories With an introduction by M. Achuthan
1973	Rahasyam	The Secret	S.P.C.S., Kottayam	Collection of 9 stories
1975	Pothichoru	Packed Rice	S.P.C.S., Kottayam	
1998	Karoorinte 33 Kathakal	33 Stories by Karoor	DC Books, Kottayam	
1999	Keezhadangal	Surrender	DC Books, Kottayam	
2008	Karoor Kathakal Sampoornam	Collected Stories	H&C, Trichur	Complete collection of stories

=== Children's literature ===
Year	Title	Title in English	Publisher	Notes
1950	Balachandran	Balachandran	S.P.C.S., Kottayam	
1958	Anchu Kadalasu	Five Papers	S.P.C.S., Kottayam	
1959	Anakkaran	The Mahout	S.P.C.S., Kottayam	Illustrations by Bappu
1960	Azhakanum Poovaliyum	Azhakan and Poovali	S.P.C.S., Kottayam	
1961	Enne Rajavakkanam	Make Me the King	S.P.C.S., Kottayam	Illustrations by M. V. Devan
1962	Rajakumariyum Bhutavum	The Princess and the Ghost	S.P.C.S., Kottayam	
1964	Sammanam	The Gift	S.P.C.S., Kottayam	
1966	Olayum Narayavum	The Leaf and the Stylus	S.P.C.S., Kottayam	Illustrations by Sankarankutty
1968	Bhrityan	The Servant	S.P.C.S., Kottayam	Illustrations by Sankarankutty
1968	Manmayil	Soil Peacock	Bharatiya Sahitya Samiti	
1983	Karoorinte Bala Kathakal	Children's Stories	S.P.C.S., Kottayam	

=== Others ===
Year	Title	Title in English	Publisher	Notes
1945	Appuppan	Grandfather	N.B.S., Kottayam	Two one-act plays
1951	Kathayalla	Not a Story	N.B.S., Kottayam	Collection of 8 essays including "Njan Kathakaranaya Katha"
1967	Gauri	Gauri	S.P.C.S., Kottayam	Novel
1967	Hari	Hari	S.P.C.S., Kottayam	Novel
1975	Panjiyum Thuniyum	Cotton and the Cloth	S.P.C.S., Kottayam	Novel
