= My Story (Das book) =

1973 book by Kamala Das

My Story (Ente Katha)
- Author: Kamala Das
- Original title: Ente Katha (എന്റെ കഥ)
- Translator: Kamala Das
- Language: English
- Genre: Autobiography
- Publisher: Sterling Publishers (1977–2009); HarperCollins (2009–present)
- Publication date: 1 February 1973
- Publication place: India
- English publication date: 1976
- Media type: Print
- Pages: 195
- ISBN: 81-207-0854-7

My Story is an autobiographical book written by Indian author and poet Kamala Das (also known as Kamala Surayya or Madhavikutty). The book was originally published in Malayalam, titled Ente Katha. The book evoked violent reactions of admiration and criticism among the readers and critics. It remains to date the best-selling woman's autobiography in India.

My Story is a chronologically ordered, linear narrative written in a realist style. In the book, Das recounts the trials of her marriage and her painful self-awakening as a woman and writer. The entire account written in the format of a novel. Though My Story was supposed to be an autobiography, Das later admitted that there was plenty of fiction in it.

== Plot summary ==
The book, with 50 chapters, follows Aami's (Kamala) life from age four through British colonial and missionary schools in Calcutta where she had to face racist discrimination; through the brutal and indulgent relationship with her husband; through her sexual awakening; her literary career; extramarital affairs; the birth of her children; and, finally, a slow but steady coming to terms with her spouse, writing, and sexuality. She mostly upholds her personal self in her autobiography rather than the political and social upheaval predominant during the war of independence in the then India.

== Publication ==
Ente Katha was serialised in 1972 in the now defunct Malayalanadu weekly, a literary magazine published by S. K. Nair. The novel not only created a literary sensation but even invited the wrath of Das' close relatives who wanted to stop its publication. V. B. C. Nair, the Editor of Malayalanadu recalls, "Despite pressure from her influential relatives to stop the publication of the work, Kamala remained bold and it proved a roaring hit boosting the circulation of the weekly by 50,000 copies within a fortnight."

Das had written My Story in English a couple of years back before it was rendered into Malayalam. At the time when she was penning down the memoir in English, S. K. Nair suggested her to translate it for his weekly. The novel was first published as a book by Current Books in February 1973. It is being published by DC Books from August 1982. The English version was published in the year 1976 by Sterling Publishers, with many changes made to the manuscript which she wrote in 1970. The book has been published by HarperCollins India since 2009. A Hindi translation titled Meri Kahaani is being published by Hind Pocket Books.

== Reception ==
My Story remains one of the most popular and controversial autobiographies by an Indian author.

Poet and litterateur K. Satchidanandan said, "I cannot think of any other Indian autobiography that so honestly captures a woman's inner life in all its sad solitude, its desperate longing for real love and its desire for transcendence, its tumult of colours and its turbulent poetry." For Jaydeep Sarangi, doyen Indian English critic, Das was a champion voice of 'confessional poetry'.

Other reviews and comments

- Sunday Standard:

"It is a straightforward story.. It has sincerity that strikes an immediate rapport with the reader."

- The Hindu

"There are entire section that are marvelously written."

- Deccan Herald

"Among the best things I have read, it is the turbulent, self-indulgent but at all times, frank story of Kamala Das."

- Assam Tribune

"Kamala Das does not hide her secrets and does not follows the rules of old morality."

- The Times of India

"The chapter headings accentuate the 'Excitement'. There is enough in it to give readers the sizzle and spice."

- National Herald

"The technique and structure of the book are remarkable. The life portrait of the cosmopolitans is quite pictorial."
