= Kadhaveedu =

Kadhaveedu / House of Stories
- Movie poster
- Directed by: Sohanlal
- Screenplay by: Sohanlal
- Story by: Vaikkom Muhammad Basheer; Madhavikutty; M. T. Vasudevan Nair
- Produced by: Job G. Oommen; Bhavesh Patel
- Starring: Kunchacko Boban; Rituparna Sengupta; Mallika; Bhama; Manoj K. Jayan; Lal; Biju Menon; Kalabhavan Shajon
- Cinematography: T. D. Sreenivasan
- Edited by: V. T. Sreejith
- Music by: M. Jayachandran
- Production companies: Visual Dreams Productions; B Positive Movie Creations
- Distributed by: Kuttamath Films & Release
- Release date: 2 November 2013
- Running time: 110 minutes
- Country: India
- Language: Malayalam

Kadhaveedu is a 2013 Indian Malayalam anthology film written and directed by Sohanlal, based on three stories penned by Vaikkom Muhammad Basheer, Madhavikutty, and M. T. Vasudevan Nair. The film stars Kunchacko Boban in the lead role, with Biju Menon, Rituparna Sengupta, Bhama, Manoj K. Jayan, Lal, Mallika, and Kalabhavan Shajon. The film was released on November 2 coinciding with the Diwali fest.

== Plot ==
Kadhaveedu revolves around the real life tales of director Raj Karthi (Kunchako Boban). Unable to come to terms with the separation of his parents in his childhood, he struggles to give a firm answer to his girlfriend's proposal. TV anchor Gina (Bhama) has the impending arrival of her parents looming on the horizon. Although they aren't disproving of her being in a live-in relationship with Raj, they yearn to see their daughter, Gina, in martial happiness.

Three tales, all directed by Raj form the backbone of the film. The first one revolves around the love affair of the daughter of a Beedi cottage factory owner and a worker-leader (Manoj K Jayan). As she pines for a Poovan Pazham (a euphemism?), the hero struggles to buy her the same. He returns with a package of oranges and wins her heart. They eventually get married, live happily, have children and grand children. The story fades to Cut with both of them chatting up at the balcony of an Old Age Home. A direct reflection of the depleting social values and societal norms.

The second tale is the darkest of all. Years ago, while scouting for shooting locales as part of his project at Film and Television Institute of India, Pune, Raj runs into a seemingly happy couple - Major Frederick Munkundan (Lal) and Rita. Despite the major being present, Raj and the much older Rita exchange flirtatious looks. The couple strike a cordial friendship with Raj and invite him to their abode “Dar es Salaam” in the hills. Raj, looking for shooting locales, takes up on their offer and furthers their friendship. On the last day of the shoot, Raj thanks the couple for their hospitality and steals a passionate kiss with Rita. In the present day, Raj returns to Dar-es-Salaam to discover that Rita has passed away. Over drinks with Major Frederick, he learns that their marriage wasn't a happy one and that the Major despised Rita for her transgressions and loose moralities. And one day, tired of their virtueless matrimony the Major kills Rita and lays her to rest. Raj, shocked and dismayed, now grows even more distant to Gina's marriage proposals.

The third tale is a heart-wrenching one where the father (Biju Menon, in yet another stirring example of being the true messiah of Malayali middle class) of three children has to bear the burden of making life go on as usual after the sudden demise of his wife.

As the shooting of this film draws to a close, Raj decides that he is ready to take Gina as his lawfully weddings wife. Gina, on the hospital bed, after being critically injured in an RTA, regains strength from Raj's text message. The closing credits show Raj and Gina holding hands and completing the housewarming of their new house.

== Cast ==
- Kunchacko Boban as Raj Karthik
  - Kiran Arakkal Sanand as Master Raj Karthik
- Biju Menon as Balachandran
- Manoj K. Jayan as Khadar
- Lal as Major Chandran Mukundan
- Rituparna Sengupta as Reeta
- Bhama as Jeena
- Mallika as Jameela
- Kalabhavan Shajon as Joseph

== Production ==
The film is an anthology with adaptations of stories written by renowned Malayalam fiction writers Vaikkom Muhammad Basheer, Madhavikutty, and M. T. Vasudevan Nair. The stories have been tweaked to fit in a modern setting and the script has been conceived by the director himself. Bengali actress Rituparna Sengupta forayed into Malayalam cinema by playing an important role in the film. She was suggested for the role by director Priyadarshan with whom she had worked in the film Bumm Bumm Bole. "Director Sohanlal has been pursuing me for the role for a year now. But once I heard the role of Rita, I knew it had all the subtleties for a great performance. Plus, the script read more like poetry rather than a scene-by-scene film," says Rituparna. Actress Bhama plays the female lead in MT's script, opposite Kunchacko Boban. She plays the role of a scribe. Kadhaveedu is Sohanlal's second feature film.

== Soundtrack ==
Songs were composed by M. Jayachandran, with lyrics written by Sohanlal and O. N. V. Kurup ("Aliveni Churulveni").

1. "Kaattile poomanam" (Shweta Mohan)
2. "Marakkanullathu" (K.S.Chitra)
3. "Aliveni Churulveni" (Madhu Balakrishnan, Mridula Warrier)
