= Sohanlal =

Indian film director and writer

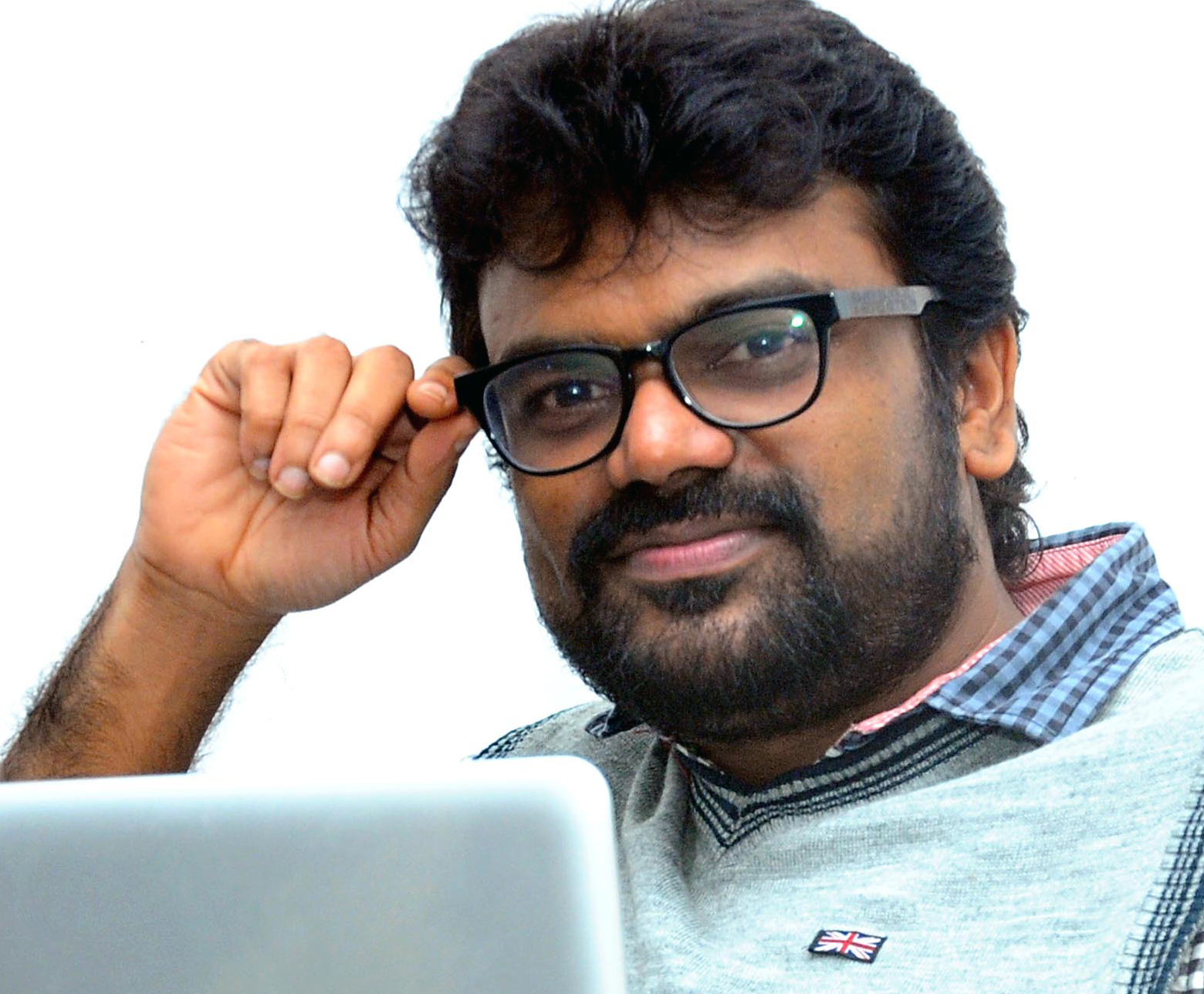
- Born: Thiruvananthapuram
- Occupations: Writer, director
- Website: http://www.sohanlal.com

Sohanlal is an Indian film director and writer, based in Kerala.

== Career ==
Sohanlal started his career as a production assistant and script writer with Doordarshan in 1996–2000 and later worked with the television channels - Indiavision in 2000–2002, Middle East Television in 2002–2004, Jeevan TV in 2004 and Amrita TV in 2004–2011 as Director-Programs.

=== Director ===
Sohanlal's first notable work was the 2006 TV film Neermaathalathinte pookkal adapted from a short story by Malayalam writer Madhavikutty / Kamala Surayya. The film was telecast on Amrita TV and received awards including Kerala State Film Awards for Best TV Film, Director, Script Writer, Music and Audiography.

Sohanlal's first feature film, Orkkuka Vallappozhum released in 2009. It won him the Kerala Film Critics Association Award for Best Debut Director and the movie screened in film festivals. His second movie Kadhaveedu (House of Stories) was released in November 2013, Based on stories by M. T. Vasudevan Nair, Vaikom Muhammad Basheer, and Madhavikutty. His third movie The Great Indian Road Movie was released in May 2019. His fourth movie is Appuvinte Sathyanweshanam and the latest film he directed is in 2022, Swapnangal Pookkunna Kaadu which is also the last part of his children's film trilogy.

== Lyrics written ==
- 2022 Swapnangal Pookkunna Kaadu
- 2014 Konthayum Poonoolum
- 2013 Kadhaveedu
- 2013 Teens
- 2012 Mazhanritham
- 2009 Thaalolam

== Books authored ==
- 2012 Limelight . Novel. DC Books
- 2015 Park Street. Novel DC Books
- 2020 Ammamaram. Novel Green Books
- 2011 London lights, Travelogue. Sign Books
- 2026 The Great Indian Road Movie, Screenplay and Travelogue. Green Books

== Filmography ==
Year	Title	Cast
2009	Orkkuka Vallappozhum	Thilakan, Jagadeesh, Krishnachandran, Chalipala, Shilpabala, Meera Vasudev
2013	Kadhaveedu	Kunchako Boban, Lal, Biju Menon, Manoj K. Jayan, Kalabhavan Shajon, Bhama, Rituparna Sengupta, Mallika, Swapna Menon
2018	The Great Indian Road Movie	Master Ashray, Vijay Anand, Anila, Madhupal, Sunil Sukhada, Prem Manoj
2019	Appuvinte Sthyanweshanam / Appu in search of truth	Master Ridhun, A. V. Anoop, Sudheer Karamana, Maniyan Pillai Raju, Meera Vasudev, Sarayu, Krishnan Balakrishnan, Albert Alex, Vinduja Vikram, Master Rohan
2022	Swapnangal pookkunna Kaadu / Trees in Dreams	Master Alok Krishna, Baby Anugraha, A.V. Anoop, Felix Kuruvila, Swetlana, Vinu Y.S, Savitha, Kalyani

=== Short films ===
Year	Title	Cast
2000	[Pedakam]	Madhu (actor), Sreekala, Hari Prasad, Lazitha
2006	Neermaathalathinte Pookkal	Praveena, Kishore Satya
2020	Eva	Payel Mukherjee

=== Filmography - Director, Documentaries ===
Year	Title
2002	Venal Vasantham
2015	Autobiography of a Stray Dog
2023	Sabdayamanam/Noishorrifics
2025	Wheels to Kodachadri
