= Ashtamoorthi K. V. =

Indian writer

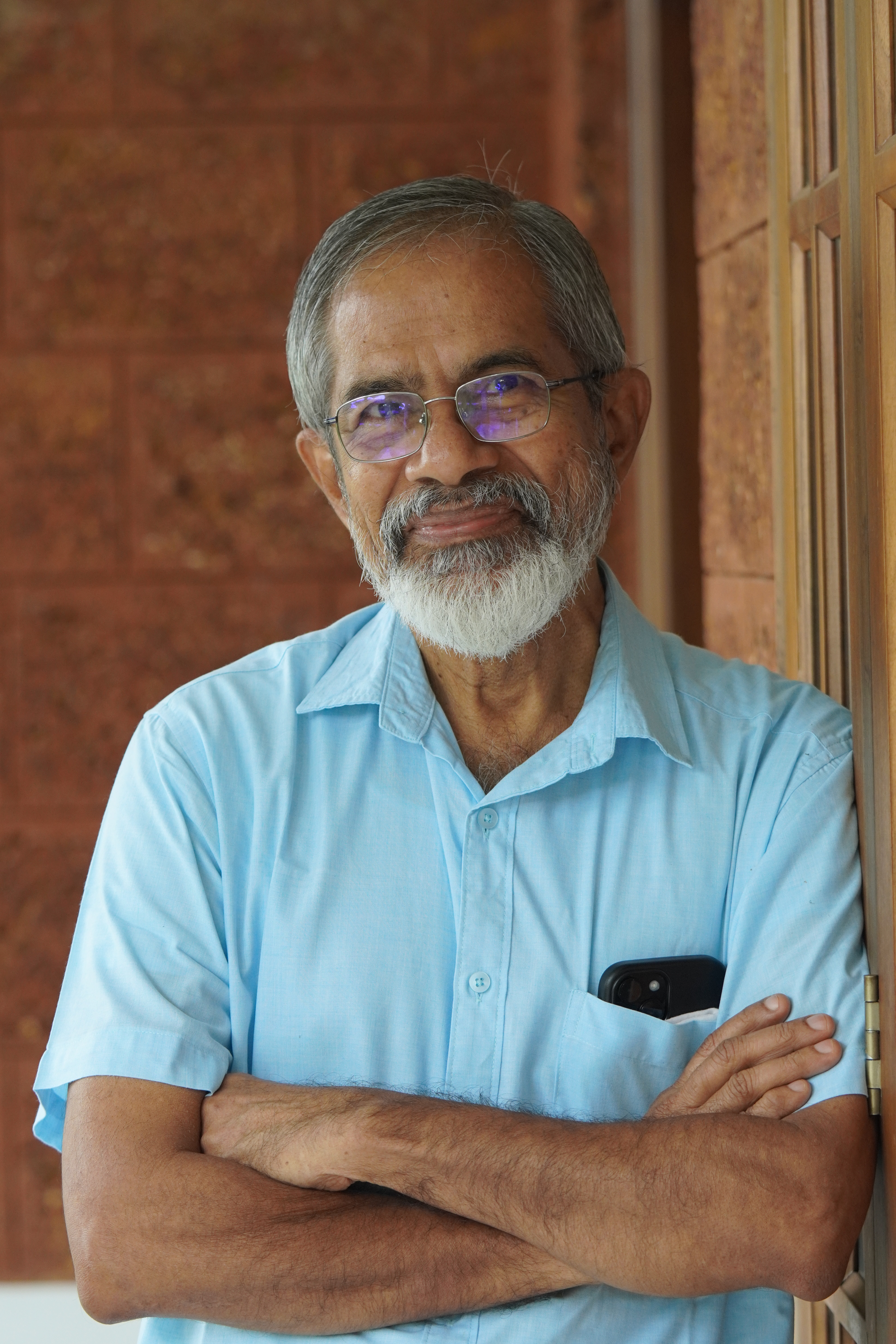
- Born: Arattupuzha village, Thrissur district, Kerala
- Notable awards: 1992 Kerala Sahitya Akademi Award for Story; 2016 Abu Dhabi Sakthi Award

Ashtamoorthi K V is a Malayalam novelist and short story writer from Kerala, India. He commenced his literature career as a novelist but later on made his own mark in the field of Malayalam short stories. Ashtamoorthi won the Kerala Sahithya Academy award in 1992 for the best short story "Veedu Vittu Pokunnu".

== Life ==
Ashtamoorthi was born to K K Vasudevan Nambudiripad and Sreedevi Antharjanam in Arattupuzha village, Thrissur district, Kerala. After his education he moved to Bombay as an accountant from where he started his writing career seriously. He wrote his first novel, Rehearsal Camp (1982) when he was in Bombay. The novel received Kumkumam Award in 1982. Then he returned to Kerala, and settled in his hometown Arattupuzha, a village near the cultural capital Thrissur. Now he is working as an accountant in SNA Oushadhasala Pvt. Ltd, Thrissur.

== Literary life ==
Ashtamoorthi's literature is strongly influenced by Indian city life which he had gained from his early Mumbai days. Malayalam writer M T Vasudevan Nair also inspired him.

== Bibliography ==
- Rehearsal Camp
- Thirichuvaravu
- Veedu Vittu Pokunnu
- Kathaasaram
- La Pathaa
- Pakal Veedu
- Marana Shikasha

== Awards ==
- 1982: Kunkumam Novel Award - Rehearsal Camp
- 1992: Kerala Sahitya Akademi Award for Story - Veedu Vittu Pokunnu
- 2016: Abu Dhabi Sakthi Award for Story - Avasanathe Shilpam
