= T. N. Prakash =

Indian writer (1955–2024)

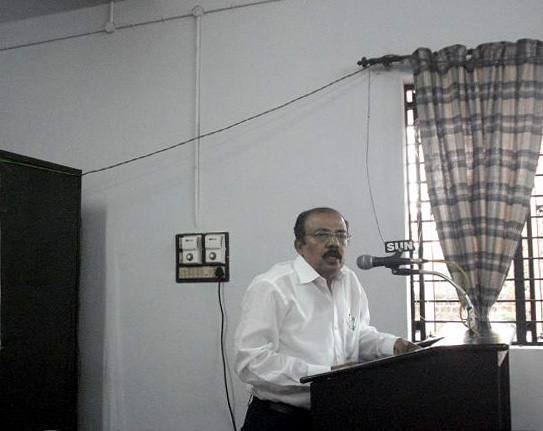
- Born: 7 October 1955; Valiyannur, Malabar district, Madras State, India
- Died: 24 March 2024 (aged 68); Valiyannur, Kannur district, Kerala, India
- Occupations: Author; Teacher
- Spouse: V. Geetha
- Children: 2

T. N. Prakash (10 October 1955 – 24 March 2024) was an Indian Malayalam-language writer from Kannur, Kerala. He published over 40 works. Besides short stories and novels, he also authored plays, radio dramas, children's literature, autobiographies, and travelogues. His short story collection Thaapam received the prestigious Kerala Sahitya Akademi Award for Story in 2005. He also received Senior Fellowship from the Central Ministry of Culture and was a member of the Kerala Sahitya Akademi and the Advisory Committee of the Sahitya Akademi.

Prakash was a mathematics teacher and worked at the Pallikkunnu Government Higher Secondary School until 2006, from which he worked as the Assistant Education Officer (Kannur South) and retired as the District Education Officer (Tellicherry) in 2011. He died at his residence in Valiyannur in Kannur district, on 24 March 2024, at the age of 68. He was undergoing medical treatment after suffering a stroke in 2015.

== Literary works ==
Stories

- Valapattanam Paalam
- Dasavataram
- Indiayude Bhupadam
- Sneha Drisyangal
- Ee Kadal Theera Nilavil
- Thiranjedutha Kathakal
- Thaapam
- Lokavasanam
- Tajmahal
- Vaazhayila
- Rajghattil Ninnoral

Novelettes

- Soundarya Lahari
- Nattal Mulaykkunna Nunakal
- Kilippechu Kekkava
- Chandana
- Thiranjedutha Pathinonnu Novalettukal

Memoirs

- Art of Living
- Nakshatravilakkukal

Children's literature

- Vanka
- Veenju
- Easterinte Thale Ratri

Novels

- Samanila
- Thanal
- Thottal Pollunna Satyangal
- Kaikeyi
- Vidhavakalude Veedu

Biography

- Dr T P Sukumaran: Perinte Porul

== Awards ==
- Kerala Sahitya Akademi Award for Story (2005)
- Joseph Mundassery Award
- Abu Dhabi Sakthi Award
- Mayilpeeli Award (2009)
- V. T. Bhattathiripad Award
