= Maanasi =

Indian writer of Malayalam literature

- Born: P. A. Rukmini; 4 May 1948 (age 78); Kerala, India
- Occupation: Writer
- Writing career
- Language: Malayalam
- Notable work: Manjile Pakshi
- Notable awards: Kerala Sahitya Akademi Award for Story

P. A. Rukmini (born 4 May 1948) is an Indian Malayalam language short story writer who writes under the pen name Maanasi or Manasi. She won the Kerala Sahitya Akademi Award for Story in 1993 for her work Manjile Pakshi.

== Biography ==
Manasi was born near Tiruvilvamala as the daughter of P. Sivarama Menon and P.A. Malathi Amma. She studied Chemical Engineering at Thrissur Engineering College but did not complete the course. She has been living in Mumbai since 1970 where she worked as a freelance copywriter for a few years. She has contributed short stories and articles to periodicals. Her many stories have been translated and published in English, Marathi and Kannada. Her story Punaradhivasam was adapted into a Malayalam feature film by VK Prakash in 2000. The film won numerous awards including the National Film Award for Best Feature Film in Malayalam and Kerala State Film Award for Best Story.

Maanasi is known for telling stories from the dark corners of the female psyche and breaking down the definition of women given by men.

== Awards ==
- Kerala Sahitya Akademi Award for Story -1993
