= Kamala Surayya =

Indian poet and author (1934–2009)

- Born: Kamala; 31 March 1934; Punnayurkulam, Thrissur District, Kerala, India
- Died: 31 May 2009 (aged 75); Pune, Maharashtra, India
- Resting place: Palayam Juma Masjid, Thiruvananthapuram, India
- Occupations: Poet, novelist, short story writer
- Spouse: K.Madhav Das
- Children: Madhav Das Nalapat; Chinnen Das; Jayasurya Das
- Parents: Balamani Amma (mother); V. M. Nair (father)
- Writing career
- Pen name: Madhavikutty
- Genres: Poetry, novel, short story, memoirs
- Notable works: Ente Katha; Balyakala Smaranakal; Neermathalam Pootha Kalam; My Story; Summer in Calcutta; The Descendants
- Notable awards: Ezhuthachan Puraskaram, Vayalar Award, Sahitya Akademi Award, Asan World Prize, Asian Poetry Prize, Kent Award

Kamala Surayya (born Kamala; 31 March 1934 – 31 May 2009), also known by her one-time pen name Madhavikutty and married name Kamala Das, was an Indian poet in English as well as an author in Malayalam from Kerala, India. Her fame in Kerala primarily stems from her short stories and autobiography, My Story, whereas her body of work in English, penned under the pseudonym Kamala Das, is renowned for its poems and candid autobiography. Her works are known for originality, versatility and indigenous flavour of the soil. She was also a widely read columnist and wrote on diverse topics including women's issues, child care, politics, etc. Her liberal treatment of female sexuality, marked her as an iconoclast in popular culture of her generation. On 31 May 2009, aged 75, she died at Jehangir Hospital in Pune.

== Early life and childhood ==
Kamala Das was born in Punnayurkulam, Ponnani taluk, Malabar District, British India (present-day Thrissur district, Kerala) on 31 March 1934, to V. M. Nair, a managing editor of the widely circulated Malayalam daily Mathrubhumi, and poet Nalapat Balamani Amma, a renowned Malayali family. Kamala got her family name, Nalapat, through matrilineal succession.

She spent her childhood in Calcutta, where her father was employed as a senior officer in the Walford Transport Company that sold Bentley and Rolls-Royce automobiles, and the Nalapat ancestral home in Punnayurkulam.

Like her mother Balamani Amma, Kamala Das also excelled in writing. Her love of poetry began at an early age through the influence of her great-uncle, Nalapat Narayana Menon, a prominent writer.

At 15 years old, she wed bank officer K. Madhava Das of the Kalipurayath family, who supported her literary pursuits. She commenced writing and publishing in both English and Malayalam. The 1960s in Calcutta witnessed an era of artistic turbulence, during which Kamala Das emerged as one of numerous voices featured in esteemed anthologies along with a generation of Indian English poets. English was the language she chose for all six of her published poetry collections.

== Literary career ==
She was known for her several Malayalam short stories as well as poems written in English. Kamala Das was also a syndicated columnist. She once claimed that "poetry does not sell in this country [India]", but her forthright columns, which sounded off on everything from women's issues and child care to politics, were popular. Kamala Das was a confessional poet whose poems have often been considered at par with those of Anne Sexton, Robert Lowell and Sylvia Plath.

Kamala Das' first book of poetry, Summer in Calcutta was a breath of fresh air in Indian English poetry. She wrote chiefly of love, betrayal, and the consequent anguish. Kamala Das abandoned the certainties offered by an archaic, and somewhat sterile, aestheticism for an independence of mind and body at a time when Indian poets were still governed by "19th-century diction, sentiment and romanticised love."

Her second book of poetry, The Descendants was even more explicit, urging women to:

Gift him what makes you woman, the scent of
Long hair, the musk of sweat between the breasts,
The warm shock of menstrual blood, and all your
Endless female hungers ...

— Kamala Das, "The Looking Glass", The Descendants

This directness of her voice led to comparisons with Marguerite Duras and Sylvia Plath. At the age of 42, she published a daring autobiography, My Story; it was originally written in Malayalam (titled Ente Katha) and later she translated it into English. Later she admitted that much of the autobiography had fictional elements.

Some people told me that writing an autobiography like this, with absolute honesty, keeping nothing to oneself, is like doing a striptease. True, maybe. I, will, firstly, strip myself of clothes and ornaments. Then I intend to peel off this light brown skin and shatter my bones. At last, I hope you will be able to see my homeless, orphan, intensely beautiful soul, deep within the bone, deep down under, beneath even the marrow, in a fourth dimension ...

— excerpts from the translation of Kamala Das' autobiography in Malayalam, Ente Katha

"An Introduction" is very bold poem in which Das expresses her femininity, individuality, and true feelings about men. This autobiographical poem is written in the colloquial style. She presents her feelings and thoughts in a bold manner. She realises her identity and understands that it is the need of every woman to raise a voice in this male-dominated society. The poet longs for love that is the result of her loneliness and frustration.

The poem "A Hot Noon in Malabar" is about climate, surrounding in a town in Malabar. The people may be annoyed by the heat, dust and noise but she likes it. She longs for the hot noon in Malabar because she associates it with the wild men, wild thoughts and wild love. It is a torture for her to be away from Malabar.

In "My Mother at Sixty-Six," Das explores the irony in a mother-daughter relationship, and it also includes the themes of aging, growing-up, separation and love. "Dance of Eunuchs" is another fine poem in which Das sympathises with eunuchs. It has an autobiographical tone. The eunuchs dance in the heat of the sun. Their costumes, makeup and their passion with which they dance suggest the female delicacy. Their outward appearance and joy is contrasted with their inward sadness. Actually, there is no joy in their heart, they cannot even dream of happiness. In the poem "A Request," Das realises that her life is meaningless. She is alone and her colourless life is designed of crumbling patterns.

Kamala Das is essentially known for her bold and frank expression. The prominent features of her poetry are an acute obsession with love and the use of confession. The main theme of her poetry is based upon freedom, love and protection. She wrote on a diverse range of topics, often disparate - from the story of a poor old servant, about the sexual disposition of upper-middle-class women living near a metropolitan city or in the middle of the ghetto. Some of her better-known stories include Pakshiyude Manam, Neypayasam, Thanuppu, and Chandana Marangal. She wrote a few novels, out of which Neermathalam Pootha Kalam, which was received favourably by the general readers, as well as, the critics, stands out.

She travelled extensively to read poetry to Germany's University of Duisburg-Essen, University of Bonn and University of Duisburg universities, Adelaide Writer's Festival, Frankfurt Book Fair, University of Kingston, Jamaica, Singapore, and South Bank Festival (London), Concordia University (Montreal, Canada), etc. Her works are available in French, Spanish, Russian, German and Japanese.

She has also held positions as Vice-chairperson in Kerala Sahitya Akademi, chairperson in Kerala Forestry Board, President of the Kerala Children's Film Society, editor of Poet magazine and poetry editor of Illustrated Weekly of India.

Although occasionally seen as an attention-grabber in her early years, she is now seen as one of the most formative influences on Indian English poetry. In 2009, The Times called her "the mother of modern English Indian poetry".

Her last book titled The Kept Woman and Other Stories, featuring translation of her short stories, was published posthumously. Kamala Das is best remembered for her controversial writings where she openly talks about the restriction imposed on women. She is known for her rebellious nature against the patriarchal conventions.

== Personal life ==
Kamala married K. Madhava Das at the age of 15. The couple had three sons: Madhav Das Nalapat, Chinen Das and Jayasurya Das. Her husband predeceased her in 1992, after 43 years of marriage. Her eldest son, Madhav Das Nalapat is married to Princess Thiruvathira Thirunal Lakshmi Bayi from the Travancore Royal House. He holds the UNESCO Peace Chair and is a professor of geopolitics at the Manipal University. He had been a resident editor of The Times of India.

On 31 May 2009, aged 75, she died at a hospital in Pune, after a long battle with pneumonia. Her body was flown to her home state of Kerala. She was interred at the Palayam Juma Masjid at Thiruvananthapuram with full state honour.

=== Politics ===
Though never politically active before, she launched a national political party, Lok Seva Party, aiming at the promotion of secularism and providing asylum to orphaned mothers. In 1984 she unsuccessfully contested in the Indian Parliament elections from Thiruvananthapuram constituency. She contested as an independent candidate and received only 1786 votes. She was depressed after the results and was advised to rest at her sister's house in Anamalai hills. She wrote the Anamalai Poems during this period. She wrote over twenty poems in this series, but only eleven have been published: eight of them in Indian Literature journal by the Sahitya Akademi (1985) and an additional three of them in the book The Best of Kamala Das (1991).

=== Conversion to Islam ===
She was born in a conservative Hindu Nair (Nalapat) family, and married a member of the Aristrocratic Menon family (Kalipurayath) with royal ancestry. She converted to Islam on 11 December 1999, at the age of 65 and assumed the name Kamala Surayya.

=== Legacy ===
- On 1 February 2018, Google Doodle by artist Manjit Thapp celebrates the work she left behind, which provides a window into the world of an engrossing woman.
- A biopic on her titled Aami directed by Kamal, released on 9 February 2018.
- Mazha, a 2000 Malayalam drama film written and directed by Lenin Rajendran was based on her short story Nashtappetta Neelambari.
- Kadhaveedu, a 2013 Malayalam anthology film written and directed by Sohanlal, was based on three stories penned by Surayya, Vaikkom Muhammad Basheer and M. T. Vasudevan Nair. In the film, the third tale was based on her short story Neypayasam.
- Neermaathalathinte Pookkal/Flowers of Neermaathalam, a 2006 Malayalam television film directed by Sohanlal was based on a story written by Surayya. The television film won a Kerala State award.

== Awards and other recognitions ==
Kamala Das has received many awards for her literary contribution, including:

- 1963: PEN Asian Poetry Prize
- 1968: Kerala Sahitya Academy Award for Story – Thanuppu
- 1985: Kendra Sahitya Academy Award (English) – Collected Poems
- 1988: Kerala State Film Award for Best Story
- 1997: Vayalar Award – Neermathalam Pootha Kalam
- 1998: Asian Poetry Prize
- 2002: Ezhuthachan Award
- 2006: Honorary D.Litt by University of Calicut
- 2006: Muttathu Varkey Award

== Books ==
=== English ===
Year	Title	Publisher
Poetry
1964	The Sirens	
1965	Summer in Calcutta	New Delhi: Everest Press
1965	An Introduction	
1967	The Descendants	Calcutta: Writer's Workshop
1973	The Old Playhouse and Other Poems	Madras: Orient Longman
1977	The Stranger Time	
1979	Tonight, This Savage Rite (with Pritish Nandy)	New Delhi: Arnold-Heinemann
1984	Collected Poems Vol. 1	Published by the author
1985	The Anamalai Poems	Indian Literature (New Delhi: Sahitya Akademi)
1991	The Best of Kamala Das	Calicut: Bodhi
1996	Only the Soul Knows How to Sing	Kottayam: DC Books
Novel
1976	Alphabet of Lust	New Delhi: Orient Paperbacks
Autobiography
1976	My Story	New Delhi: Sterling Publishers
Short story collections
1977	A Doll for the Child Prostitute	New Delhi: India Paperbacks
1992	Padmavati the Harlot and Other Stories	New Delhi: Sterling Publishers

=== Malayalam ===
Year	Title	Publisher	Notes
Short story collections
1955	Mathilukal	Calicut: Mathrubhumi	Collection of 9 stories; written under the name Nalappatt Kamala
1958	Pathu Kathakal	Kottayam: SPCS	Collection of 10 stories
1960	Naricheerukal Parakkumbol	Cochin: Sahithya Parishath	Collection of 11 stories
1962	Tharishunilam	Cochin: Sahithya Parishath	Collection of 12 stories
1963	Ente Snehitha Aruna	Thrissur: Current Books	Collection of 9 stories
1964	Chuvanna Pavada	Thrissur: Current Books	Collection of 9 stories
1964	Pakshiyude Manam	Thrissur: Current Books	Collection of 9 stories
1967	Thanuppu	Thrissur: Current Books	Collection of 19 stories
1969	Rajavinte Premabhajanam	Thrissur: Current Books	Collection of 14 stories
1971	Premathinte Vilapakavyam	Thrissur: Current Books	Collection of 13 stories
1982	Madhavikuttiyude Kathakal	Kottayam: DC Books	Collection of 36 stories With an introduction by Kalarcode Vasudevan Nair
1985	Madhavikuttiyude Kathakal	Calicut: Mathrubhumi	Collection of 36 stories With an introduction by M. Rajeev Kumar
1990	Palayanam	Thrissur: Current Books	
1991	Swathanthrya Samara Senaniyude Makal	Calicut: Poorna	
1994	Nashtapetta Neelambari	Kasargod: Kalakshetram	Collection of 13 stories
1994	Ennennum Thara	Trivandrum: Neruda	Includes a study by M. Rajeev Kumar titled Neermathalathinte Ormaykk
1996	Chekkerunna Pakshikal	Kottayam: DC Books	Collection of 13 stories
1998	Madhavikuttiyude Premakathakal	Calicut: Olive	
1999	Ente Cherukathakal	Kottayam: DC Books	Collection of 13 stories
1999	Veendum Chila Kathakal	Trivandrum: Prabhath	Collection of 9 stories
2002	Malayalathinte Suvarna Kathakal	Thrissur: Green Books	Collection of 20 stories
1999	Ente Priyapetta Kathakal	Kottayam: DC Books	Collection of 19 stories
2004	Peeditharude Kathakal	Trivandrum: Prabhath	Collection of 20 stories
2004	Madhavikuttyde Sthreekal	Calicut: Mathrubhumi	Collection of 20 stories
2005	Unmakkathakal	Alleppey: Unma Pub.	
Novels
1977	Madhavikuttiyude Moonnu Novelukal	Trivandrum: Navadhara	Collection of the short novels Rugminikkoru Pavakkutty, Rohini and Avasanathe Athithi
1978	Manasi	Trivandrum: Prabhatham	
1983	Manomi	Thrissur: Current Books	
1988	Chandanamarangal	Kottayam: Current Books	
1989	Kadal Mayooram	Kottayam: Current	Short novel
1999	Amavasi	Kottayam: DC Books	co-authored with K. L. Mohanavarma
2000	Kavadam	Kottayam: DC Books	co-authored with Sulochana Nalapat
2000	Madhavikkuttiyude Pranaya Novelukal	Calicut: Lipi	Collection of 6 novels: Parunthukal, Atharinte Manam, Aattukattil, Rathriyude Padavinyasam, Kadal Mayooram, Rohini
2005	Vandikkalakal	Calicut: Mathrubhumi	
Memoirs/Autobiography/Essays
1973	Ente Katha	Thrissur: Current Books	Autobiography
1984	Irupathiyonnam Nottandilekk	Kottayam: SPCS	Collection of 9 essays
1986	Bhayam Ente Nishavasthram	Calicut: Mathrubhumi	Collection of poems, stories and notes Written under the name Kamala Das; With illustrations by A. S. Nair
1987	Balyakala Smaranakal	Kottayam: DC Books	Childhood memories
1989	Varshangalkku Mumbu	Thrissur: Current Books	Memoirs
1992	Diarykurippukal	Thrissur: Current Books	Memoirs
1992	Neermathalam Pootha Kalam	Kottayam: DC Books	Autobiographical
1997	Ottayadipatha	Kottayam: DC Books	Memoirs
1999	Ente Pathakal	Trivandrum: Prabhath	Collection of 50 essays
2001	Snehathinte Swargavathilukal	Calicut: Papppiyon	Collection of 43 essays/memoirs
2005	Pranayathinte Album	Calicut: Olive	Selected love quotes ed. Arshad Bathery
2019	Ottayadipathayum Vishadam Pookkunna Marangalum	Kottayam: DC Books	Collection of Ottayadi Patha, Vishadam Pookkunna Marangal, Bhayam Ente Nishavasthram and Diarykurippukal
	Vishadam Pookkunna Marangal	Kottayam: DC Books	Memoirs
Translations
1986	Ente Kavitha	Pandalam: Pusthaka Prasadha; Sangham	Translated by K. P. Nirmal Kumar, K. V. Thampi, Cherukunnam Purushothaman, G. Dileepan
1991	Kamala Dasinte Thiranjedutha Kavithakal	Kottayam: DC Books	Translated by Abraham
2004	Madhuvidhuvinu Sesham	Alleppey: Fabian Books	Translation of 43 poems New edition of Ente Kavitha

== Appearances in the following poetry Anthologies ==
- Ten Twentieth-Century Indian Poets (1976) ed. by R. Parthasarathy and published by Oxford University Press, New Delhi
- The Oxford India Anthology of Twelve Modern Indian Poets (1992) ed. by Arvind Krishna Mehrotra and published by Oxford University Press, New Delhi
- The Golden Treasure of Writers Workshop Poetry (2008) ed. by Rubana Huq and published by Writers Workshop, Calcutta

== See also ==
- Indian English literature
- Indian Writer
- Indian Poets
