= Government Sanskrit College, Thiruvananthapuram =

College in Kerala, India

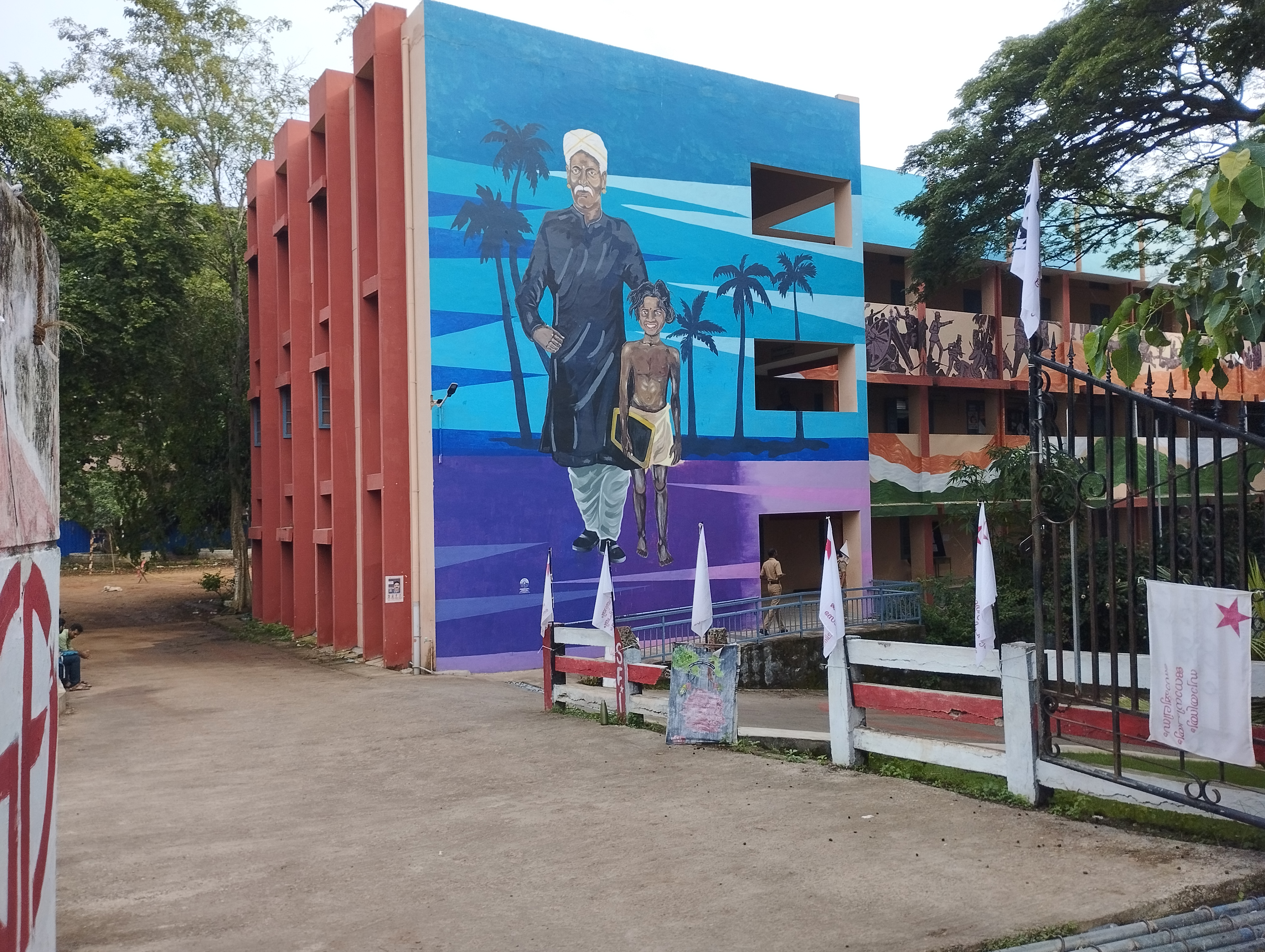
- Type: Public
- Established: 1889; 137 years ago
- Affiliations: University of Kerala
- Location: Trivandrum, Kerala, India
- Campus: Urban

Government Sanskrit College, Thiruvananthapuram, is one of the oldest undergraduate and postgraduate, coeducational college located in Thiruvananthapuram, Kerala. It was established in the year 1889. The college is affiliated with Kerala University. This college offers different courses in Sanskrit literature.

== Accreditation ==
The college is recognized by the University Grants Commission (UGC).

== Benefits ==
"Vasudevasudhaarasam" is a documentary directed by Suresh Gayathri about the comprehensive events of Professor R. Vasudevan Potti(Early Lecturer) contribution to the Sanskrit language.

SureshGayathri - World's first children's Sanskrit film "Madhurasmitham" directed by an alumnus of this college.
