= Madhav Das Nalapat =

Indian academic

Madhav Das Nalapat (b. 1950) is the UNESCO Peace Chair at Manipal University, and Director of the Department of Geopolitics & International Relations. Nalapat has written columns for the Pakistan Observer, United Press International, China Daily, The Diplomat, Radio Free Europe/Radio Liberty, Economic and Political Weekly, and Rediff.

M. D. Nalapat is a son of the poet Kamala Surayya.
