= Kadappoor =

Kadappooru
- village
- Location in Kerala, India Kadappooru (India)
- Coordinates: 9°42′0″N 76°35′0″E
- Country: India
- State: Kerala
- District: Kottayam

Languages
  - Official: Malayalam, English
- Time zone: UTC+5:30 (IST)
- PIN: 686587
- Telephone code: 0481
- Vehicle registration: KL-67
- Nearest city: Ettumanoor
- Literacy: 100%%
- Lok Sabha constituency: Kottayam

Kadappooru is a village in Kottayam district, Kerala, India. It is located 3 kilometers from Ettumanoor - Pala Road (deviated at Koodalloor Kavala Jn), 5 km off from Cochin - Kottayam Road (deviated at Vempally Jn) and 18 km from Kottayam town.

== Economy ==
Kadappoor has paddy fields, natural rubber plantations and other agricultural products. Kattachira thodu, a small river flows near Kadappoor rejoins at Kattachira with Meenachil River.

== Administration ==
This village is situated in Kanakkary Panchayath and belongs to Kaduthuruthy legislative constituency and nearby villages are Koodalloor, Vempally, Kattachira and Clamattom.
