= K. P. Nirmal Kumar =

Indian writer

- Born: 1947 (age 78–79); Kerala, India
- Occupation: writer
- Writing career
- Notable awards: Kerala Sahitya Akademi Award

K. P. Nirmal Kumar (born 1947) is a Malayalam-language writer from Kerala, India. He is reckoned among the few front-ranking fiction writers in Malayalam who have contemporary vision.

He entered the literary field with the publication of the story Irumbinte Sangeetham in Mathrubhumi Weekly. His first collection Jalam won the Kerala Sahitya Akademi Award in the year 1971. His next works Oru Sangham Abhayarthikal and Krishna Gandhaka Jwalakal were published by Current Books. He also translated Kamala Das's Summer in Calcutta into Malayalam. His next work Chelakkarayude Atheetha Swapnangal was published only in 1995 by Mulberry Publications, after a gap of nearly two decades. His novel Janamejayante Jignasa (Janamejaya's Curiosity) was published in 2010 and looks at some of the episodes in the Mahabharata and at the emotional underpinning of the characters. His latest work, Innathe Athithi Atheethasakthi, follows an unconventional method to depict Mahabharatha and focuses on themes of sex, power and invasions in the epic. A graduate in commerce, Nirmal Kumar worked in the Kanjirappally branch of the Bank of Baroda and retired as the Senior Manager. He lives in Peringode, Palakkad district.

== Works ==
- Jalam (Current Books, 1970) (Stories)
- Oru Sangham Abhayarthikal (Current Books) (Stories)
- Krishna Gandhaka Jwalakal (Current Books) (Stories)
- Chelakkarayude Atheetha Swapnangal (Mulberry Publications, 1995) (Stories)
- Mananchirayile Pottichirikkunna Pathradhipar (DC Books, 2005) (Stories)
- Janamejayante Jignasa (DC Books, 2010) (Novel)
- Innathe Athithi Atheethasakthi (DC Books, 2013) (Novel)

== Awards ==
- 1971: Kerala Sahitya Akademi Award for Jalam
- 2005: Padmarajan Award for Jaran / Avanoru Poojyapaadan
