= Balamani Amma =

Indian poet (1909–2004)

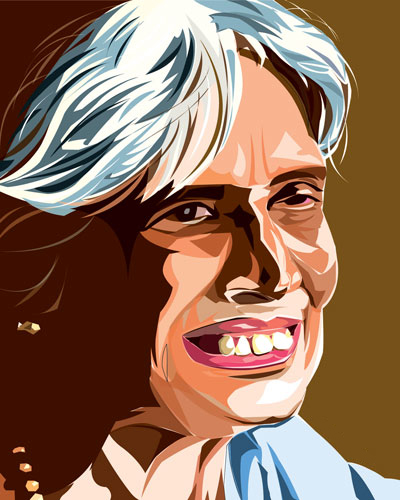
- Born: 19 July 1909; Punnayurkulam, Ponnani taluk, Malabar District, Madras Presidency, British India (Now in Thrissur)
- Died: 29 September 2004 (aged 95); Kochi, Kerala, India
- Occupation: Poet
- Spouse: V. M. Nair
- Children: Kamala Surayya, Sulochana, Mohandas, Shyam Sunder
- Writing career
- Genre: Poetry
- Notable awards: Padma Bhushan, Sahitya Akademi Award, Saraswati Samman, Asan Prize, Ezhuthachan Award

Nalapat Balamani Amma (19 July 1909 – 29 September 2004) was an Indian poet who wrote in Malayalam. Amma (Mother), Muthassi (Grandmother), and Mazhuvinte Katha (The story of the Axe) are some of her well-known works. She was a recipient of many awards and honours, including the Padma Bhushan, Saraswati Samman, Sahitya Akademi Award, and Ezhuthachan Award. She was the mother of writer Kamala Das, also known as Madhavikutty.

== Biography ==
Balamani Amma was born on 19 July 1909 to Chittanjoor Kunhunni Raja and Nalapat Kochukutti amma at Nalappat, her ancestral home in Punnayurkulam, Ponnani taluk, Malabar District, British India. Balamani got her family name, Nalapat. She was influenced by Nalapat Narayana Menon and the poet Vallathol Narayana Menon.

At age 19, Amma married V. M. Nair, who became the managing director and managing editor of Mathrubhumi, a widely circulated Malayalam newspaper, and later an executive at an automobile company. She left for Kolkata after her marriage to live with her husband. V. M. Nair died in 1977.

Amma was the mother of writer Kamala Surayya, (also known as Kamala Das), who translated one of her mother's poems, "The Pen", which describes the loneliness of a mother. Her other children include sons Mohandas, Shyam Sunder, and daughter Sulochana.

Amma died on 29 September 2004 after five years of Alzheimer's disease. Her cremation was attended with full state honours.

== Poetry ==
Balamani Amma published more than 20 anthologies of poems, several prose works, and translations. Her first poem "Kooppukai" was published in 1930. Her first recognition came when she received the Sahithya Nipuna Puraskaram, an award from Parikshith Thampuran, former ruler of Kingdom of Cochin. Nivedyam is the collection of poems of Balamani Amma from 1959 to 1986. Lokantharangalil is an elegy on the death of the poet Nalapat Narayana Menon.

=== Collections of poems ===
- Kudumbini (1936)
- Dharmamargathil (1938)
- Sthree Hridayam (1939)
- Prabhankuram (1942)
- Bhavanayil (1942)
- Oonjalinmel (1946)
- Kalikkotta (1949)
- Velichathil (1951)
- Avar Paadunnu (1952)
- Pranamam (1954)
- Lokantharangalil (1955)
- Sopanam (1958)
- Muthassi (1962)
- Mazhuvinte Katha (1966)
- Ambalathilekku (1967)
- Nagarathil (1968)
- Veyilaarumbol (1971)
- Amruthamgamaya (1978)
- ’’Sahapadikal’’(1979)
- Sandhya (1982)
- Nivedyam (1987)
- Mathruhridayam (1988)
- To My Daughter (Malayalam)
- Kulakkadavil
- Mahavira

== Awards and recognition ==
Her poetry earned her the titles of Amma (mother) and Muthassi (grandmother) of Malayalam poetry. While delivering the Balamaniyamma remembrance speech at the Kerala Sahitya Akademi, Akkitham Achuthan Namboothiri, described her as the "prophet of human glory" and said that her poetry had been an inspiration to him. Writer and critic M. N. Karassery considered her a Gandhian, and believed her works should be revisited when people consider Nathuram Godse to represent Indian nationalism.

She received many literary honours and awards, including the Kerala Sahithya Akademi Award for Muthassi (1963), Kendra Sahitya Akademi Award for Muthassi (1965), Asan Prize (1989), Vallathol Award (1993), Lalithambika Antharjanam Award (1993), Saraswati Samman for Nivedyam (1995), Ezhuthachan Award (1995), and N. V. Krishna Warrier Award (1997). She was also a recipient of India's third highest civilian honour, the Padma Bhushan, in 1987.

She is often regarded as the ‘Mathruthwathinte Kavi’ (poetess of motherhood’ or ‘Muttassi’ (grandmother), due to her fondness for children.

== Legacy ==
The Kochi International Book Festival Committee created the Balamani Amma Award, with a cash award for writers.

On 19 July 2022, Google honoured Amma with a Google Doodle on her birth anniversary. She has been referred to as "the grandmother of Malayalam literature".

== See also ==
- Malayalam literature
- List of Indian poets
