= Punnayurkulam =

- Village
- Interactive map of Punnayurkulam
- Coordinates: 10°40′0″N 75°59′0″E
- Country: India
- State: Kerala
- District: Thrissur

Languages
  - Official: Malayalam, English
- Time zone: UTC+5:30 (IST)
- Vehicle registration: KL-46
- Nearest city: Thrissur
- Lok Sabha constituency: Thrissur
- Website: www.punnayoorkulam.com

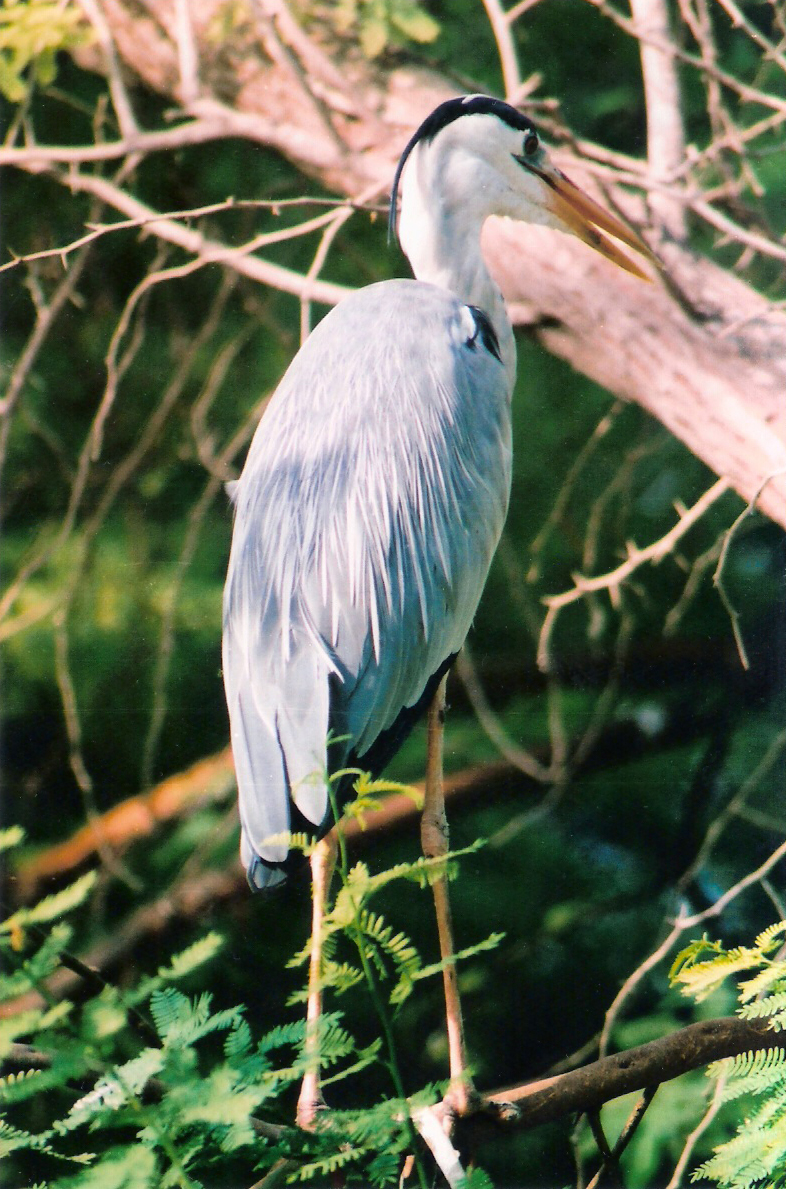
Grey heron at Punnayurkulam

Punnyurkulam is a village and gram panchayat in Thrissur district of Kerala, the southwestern state of India.

== Location ==
The village is located 10 km north west of the world-famous temple town Guruvayur along the Guruvayur-Ponnani state highway.

== History ==
Punnayurkuam is famous for its cultural heritage, the midi level scripts and literatures describes the region was part of the princely state of Valluvanad, the dynasty who ruled the region from AD 400 to AD 1300 until the Saamoothiri dynasty of erstwhile state of Kozhikode (anglicised Calicut) conquered Valluvanadu and annexed the state.

The village is the birthplace to many award-winning writers, including Nalappat Narayana Menon, Nalappatt Balamani Amma and Kamala Das.

Temples like kadikkad shiva temple, punnayurkulam Bhagawati Temple, Parur Siva Temple and Govidapuram Krishna Temple are cultural icons of the village.

== Notable people ==
- The poet Kamala Surayya's major work Balyakala Smaranakal plots the village and its heritage.
- Punnayurkulam V Bappu was a voracious poet from Punnayurkulam, Kerala. Muthumaala and Shwasikkunna Shavangal are some of his notable works. Apart from poetry, other literary works were also published. His work Oru Persian Kadha, the translation of the famous Badarul Muneer Husnul Jamal of Moinkutti Vaidyar to Malayalam received the Kerala Sahithya Academy special award.
