= List of news media ownership in India =

News media in India is owned by business families and individuals along with numerous investors, in the form of joint stock companies, societies, trusts and firms. The Government of India owns news media such as DD News and All India Radio. While the news media market (readership and viewership) in India is highly concentrated, the total number of owners includes over 25,000 individuals, 2000 joint stock companies and 1200 societies.

== Private ownership ==
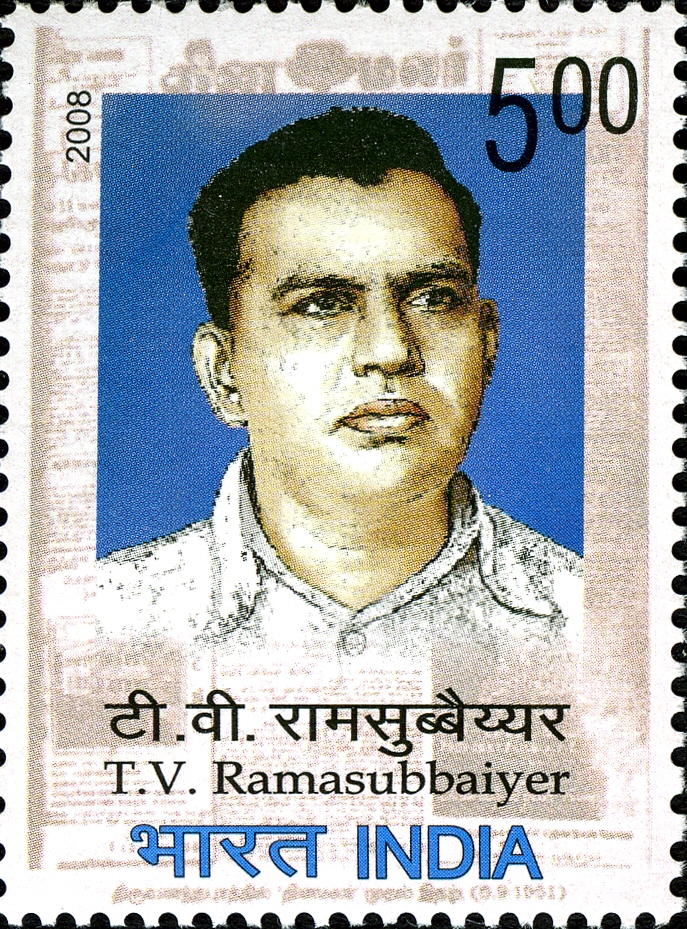
T. V. Ramasubbaiyer
Dinamalar

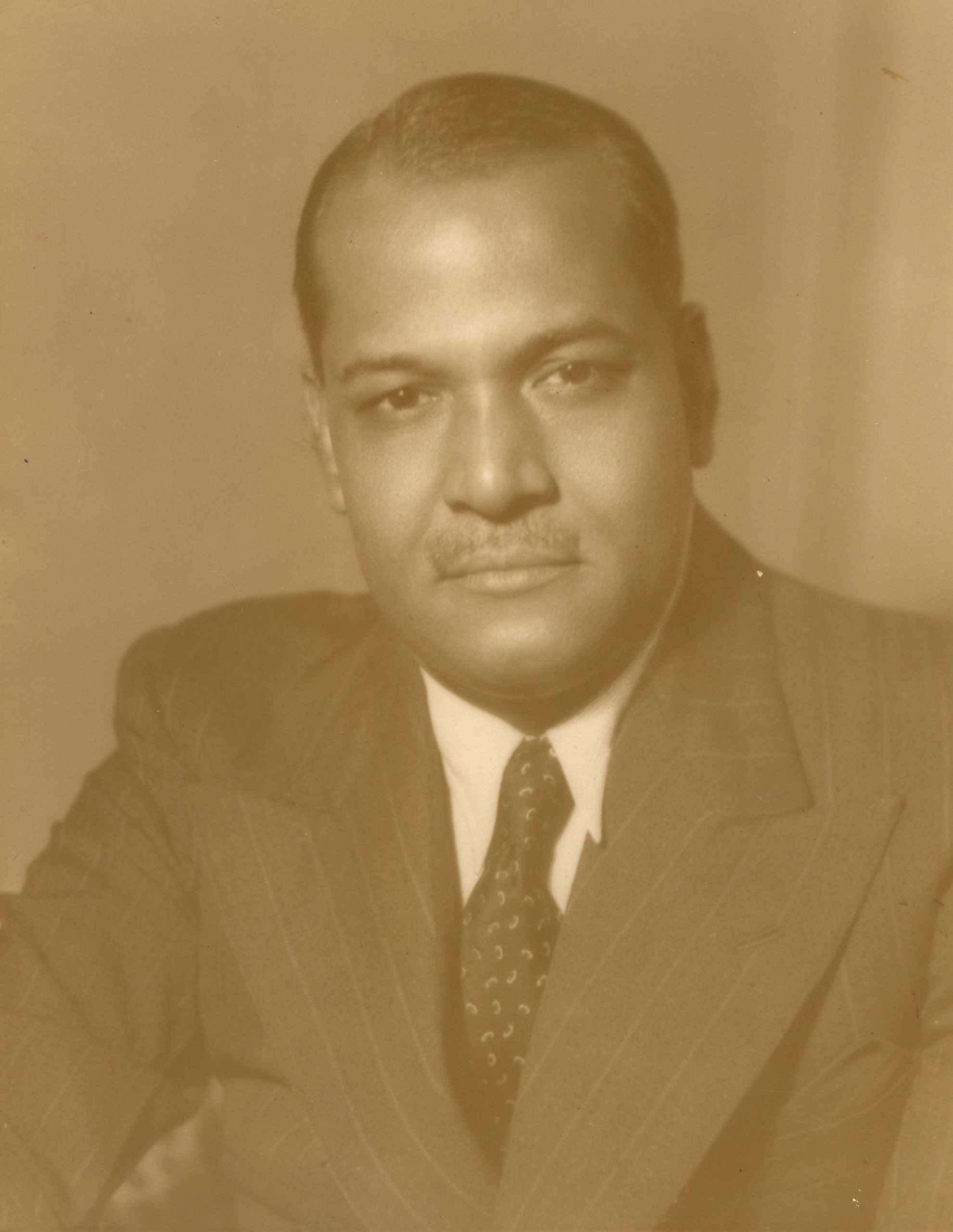
Ramnath Goenka
Indian Express Limited

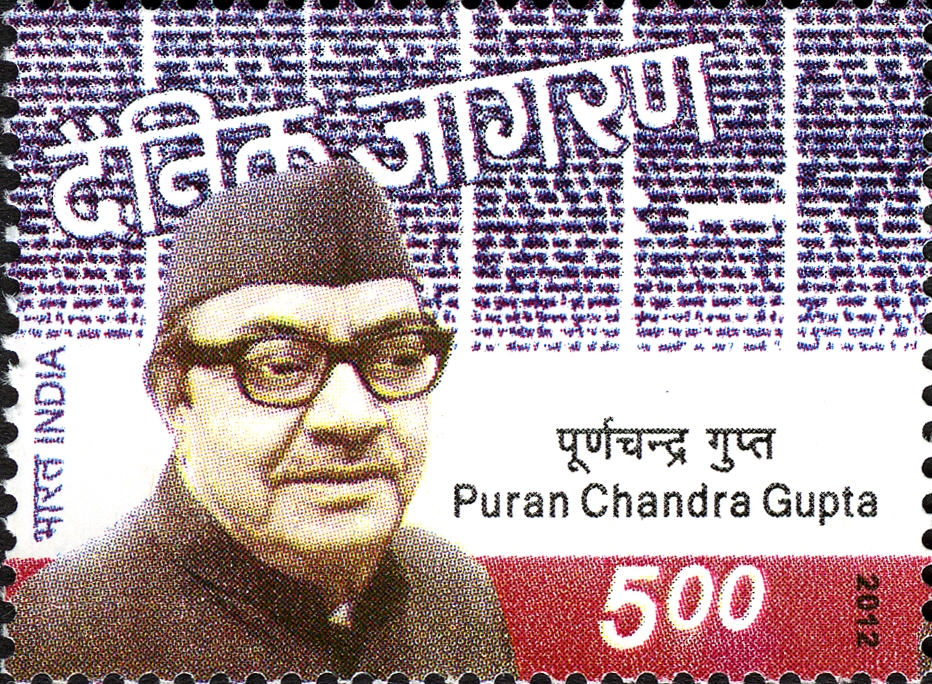
Puran Chandra Gupta
Dainik Jagran

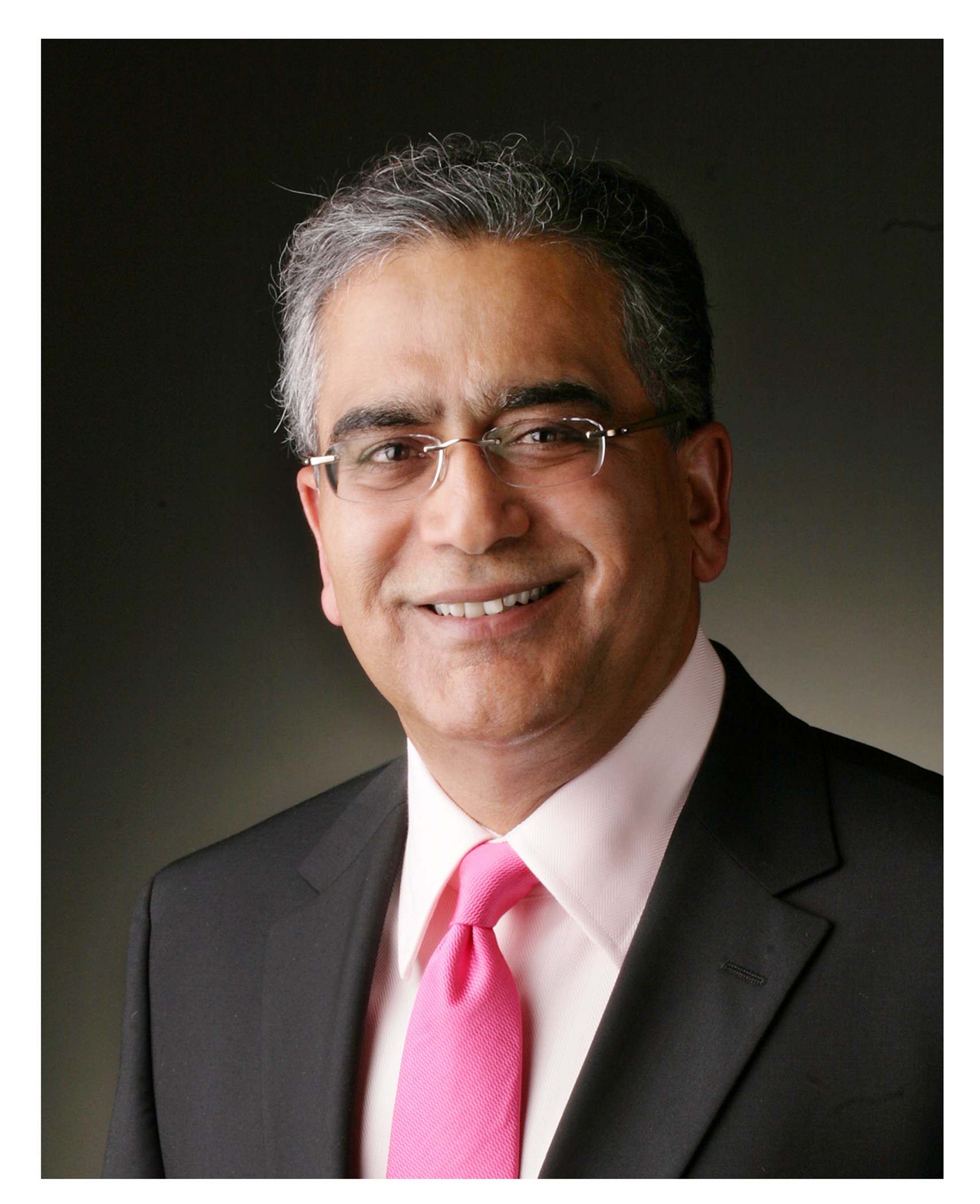
Aroon Purie
India Today

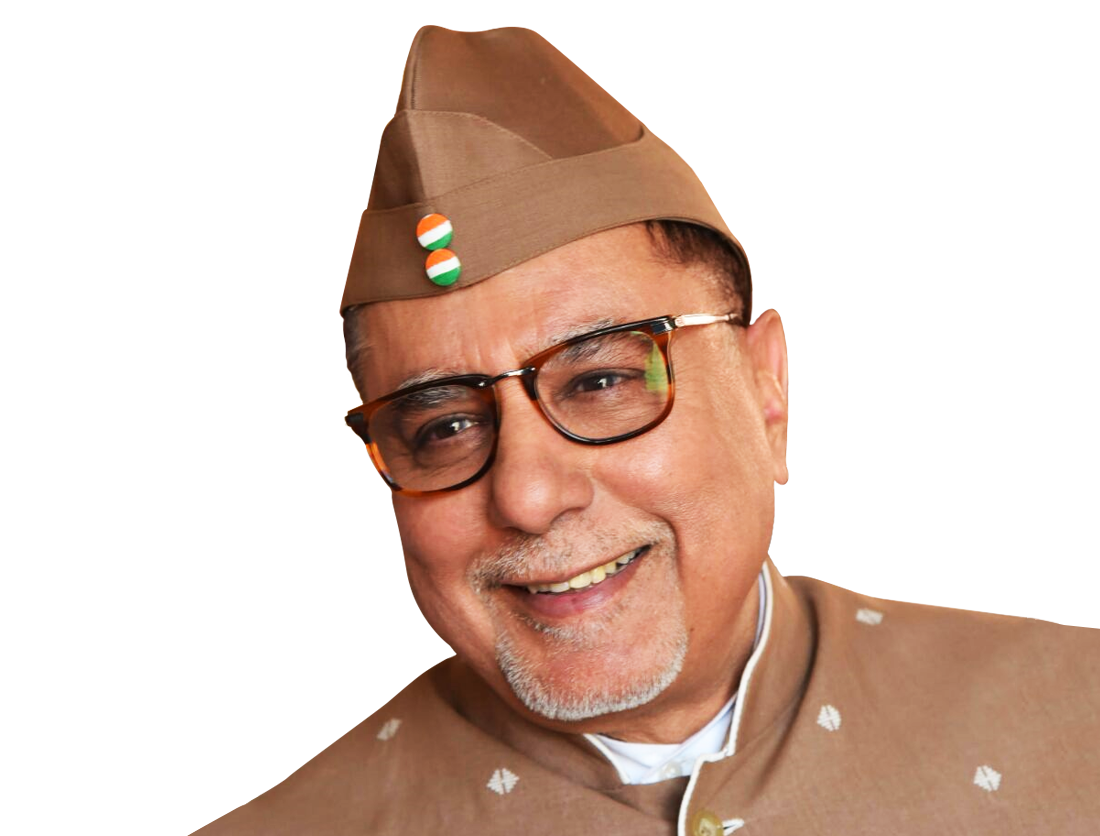
Subhash Chandra
Zee News, WION

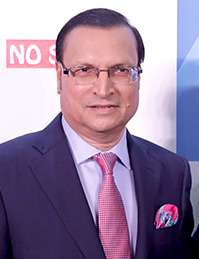
Rajat Sharma
India TV

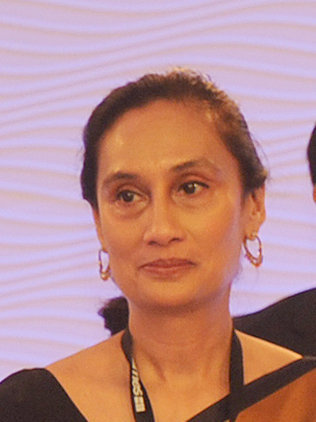
Shobhana Bhartia
Hindustan Times, Hindustan, Livemint

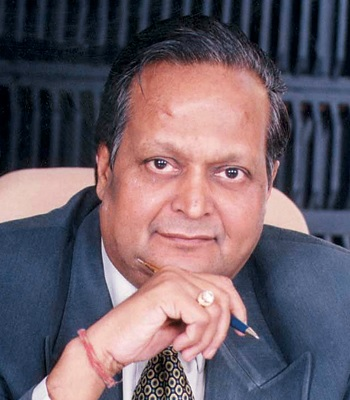
Ramesh Chandra Agarwal
Dainik Bhaskar Group

Majority stake or ownership for news companies have changed over time, such as in the case of TV9; Srini Raju let go of his nearly 80% share in 2018.

P: politician, J: journalist, B: businessperson
News media groups and news media outlets	Individuals	Political Affiliation	Ref.
Network 18 Group (Firstpost, CNN-News18, News18 India)	Mukesh Ambani (B)	Bharatiya Janata Party	
Dainik Bhaskar Group (Dainik Bhaskar)	Ramesh Chandra Agarwal		
PTC News	Sukhbir Singh Badal (P)	Shiromani Akali Dal	
Quintillion Media Pvt Ltd (The Quint)	Raghav Bahl, Ritu Kapur		
The Hind Samachar Limited (Punjab Kesari)	Vijay Kumar Chopra		
Lokmat Media Group (Lokmat, IBN-Lokmat)	Rajendra Darda (P), Vijay J. Darda (P)	Indian National Congress	
Express Group (The Indian Express, The Financial Express, Jansatta, Loksatta, Lokprabha)	Ramnath Goenka, Viveck Goenka		
Jagran Prakashan Limited (Dainik Jagran, The Inquilab)	Puran Chandra Gupta		
Main article: The Times Group § Assets The Times of India, Times Now, Mumbai Mirror, The Economic Times, Bangalore Mirror, Ahmadabad Mirror, Cricbuzz	Sahu Jain		
Kalaignar TV Private Limited (Kalaignar Seithigal)	Kanimozhi Karunanidhi	Dravida Munnetra Kazhagam	
Kasturi and Sons Limited (The Hindu Group, The Hindu, The Hindu Business Line, Sportstar, Frontline)	S. Kasturi Ranga Iyengar		
The Siasat Daily	Zahid Ali Khan (J, P)		
The Patrika Group (Rajasthan Patrika, Catch News, Balhans, Chotu Motu, Radio FM Tadka, Patrika TV)	Gulab Kothari		
Mathrubhumi, Mathrubhumi News	K. Kelappan (P)		
Amar Ujala	Rajul Maheshwari		
The Malayala Manorama Company (Malayala Manorama)	Kandathil Varghese Mappillai		
Sun Group (Sun News, Dinakaran, Tamil Murasu, Mutharam,Red FM)	Kalanithi Maran (B)	Dravida Munnetra Kazhagam	
Odisha Television Limited (Odisha TV)	Baijayant Panda (P)	Biju Janata Dal (2000-2018) Bharatiya Janata Party (2018-present)	
Sakal Media Group (Sakal, Sakal Times, Gomantak, Gomantak Times, Saam TV)	Supriya Sule (P)	Nationalist Congress Party – Sharadchandra Pawar	
India Today Group (India Today, India Today (TV), Aaj Tak; Aaj Tak Tez, Delhi Aaj Tak, Mail Today, Business Today)	Aroon Purie		
ETV Network, Eenadu	Ramoji Rao		
Sakshi (Sakshi TV, Sakshi newspaper)	Y. S. Jagan Mohan Reddy (P)	YSR Congress Party	
NDTV (NDTV, NDTV India, NDTV Prime, NDTV Profit, Good Times, Gadgets360, NDTV Imagine)	Gautam Adani	Bharatiya Janata Party	
ABP Group (Anandabazar Patrika, ABP News, ABP Ananda, ABP Majha, The Telegraph)	Ashok Kumar Sarkar	Bharatiya Janata Party	
Pride East Entertainments Private (News Live, North East Live)	Riniki Bhuyan Sarma	Riniki Bhuyan Sharma is married to Himanta Biswa Sarma (INC 1991-2015, BJP 2015-present)	
Independent News Service (IndiaTV)	Rajat Sharma	Bharatiya Janata Party	
National Herald, Qaumi Awaz, Navjivan	Sonia Gandhi (P) Rahul Gandhi (P)	Indian National Congress	
The Caravan			
Prahaar		Maharashtra Swabhiman Party	
Saamana	Thackerey family (P)	Shiv Sena (UBT)	
Outlook	Rajan Raheja Group		
Hindustan Times, Hindustan, Livemint	Shobhana Bhartia, G. D. Birla (B, P)	Indian National Congress	
Dinamalar	T. V. Ramasubbaiyer	Bharatiya Janata Party	
Dina Thanthi, Thanthi TV	S. P. Adithanar	Naam Thamilar Katchi	
Zee Media (WION, Zee News)	Subhash Chandra (P, B)		
The Pioneer	Chanda Mitra (P, J)	Bharatiya Janata Party (2010-2018) Trinamool Congress (2018-2021) Bharatiya Janata Party (2021-present)	
Republic TV	Arnab Goswami	Bharatiya Janata Party	

== Government ownership ==
Group	Outlets	Ref
Prasar Bharti	DD News, All India Radio	
–	Sansad TV (merger of Rajya Sabha TV and Lok Sabha TV)	
