= List of newspapers in India by circulation =

This is a list of the top newspapers in India by circulation. These figures include both print and digital subscriptions, are compiled by the Audit Bureau of Circulations. The figures include normal print editions, branded print editions (e.g., regional editions or editions tailored for commuters), and digital subscriptions (e.g., for tablet computers or restricted-access).

Circulation figures try to estimate the number of copies sold, while readership figures are usually higher as they tend to estimate the number of people who actually read the newspaper. Typically, readership tends to be 2.5 times circulation, though this may be higher or lower depending on individual cases.

== List of newspapers by circulation ==
Average qualifying sales
S.no.	Newspaper	Language	Headquarters	July-Dec. 2022	Jan.-Jun. 2022	Owner	Nameplate
1	Dainik Bhaskar	Hindi	Bhopal	3,566,617	875,259	DB Corp	
2	Malayala Manorama	Malayalam	Kottayam	1,920,096	1,971,773	Malayala Manorama Company Limited	
3	The Times of India	English	Mumbai	1,872,442	1,590,784	The Times Group	
4	Amar Ujala	Hindi	Noida	1,744,512	1,845,983	Amar Ujala Ltd.	
5	Hindustan	Hindi	New Delhi	1,666,724	1,572,359	HT Media	
6	The Hindu	English	Chennai	1,415,792		The Hindu Group	
7	Rajasthan Patrika	Hindi	Jaipur	1,385,561	1,414,267	Patrika Group	
8	Eenadu	Telugu	Hyderabad	1,351,956	1,223,862	Ramoji Group	
9	Dainik Jagran	Hindi	Kanpur	1,277,605	2,667,808	Jagran Prakashan Limited	
10	Sakal	Marathi	Pune	1,263,955		Sakal Media Group	
11	Dina Thanthi	Tamil	Chennai	1,137,041	1,131,279	Thanthi Trust	
12	Mathrubhumi	Malayalam	Kozhikode	1,084,215	1,058,533	The Mathrubhumi Printing and Publishing Company Ltd	
13	Daily Sakal	Marathi		1,064,721	-	Sakal Media Group	
14	Sakshi	Telugu	Hyderabad	1,002,585	951,292	Jagathi Publications Ltd.	
15	Ananda Bazar Patrika	Bengali	Kolkata	1,206,750	1,222,890	ABP Group	
16	Hindustan Times	English		738,154	15,889	HT Media	
17	The Telegraph	English	Kolkata	693,742	689,773	ABP Group	
18	Lokmat	Marathi		692,768	-	Lokmat Media Limited	
19	Deshabhimani	Malayalam	Trivandrum	605,561	622,276	Kerala State Committee of the Communist Party of India (Marxist)	
20	Vijayavani	Kannada	Hubli	551,994	542,457	VRL Group	
21	Divya Bhaskar	Gujarati		511,871	-	DB Corp	
22	Vijaya Karnataka	Kannada	Bengaluru	503,688	473,786	The Times Group	
23	Pudhari	Marathi		503,304	-	Pudhari Publications	
24	Bartaman	Bengali		472,423	-	Bartaman Pvt. Ltd.	
25	Akila Daily	Gujarati	Rajkot	300,000	300,000	Akila Publications	
26	Andhra Jyothi	Telugu	Hyderabad	386,797	375,611	Aamoda Publications Pvt. Ltd.	
27	Prajavani	Kannada	Bengaluru	347,132	-	The Printers (Mysore) Pvt. Ltd.	
28	The Economic Times	English	Mumbai	269,882	262,114	The Times Group	
29	Maalai Malar	Tamil	Chennai				
30	DT Next	English	Chennai			Thanthi Trust	

== List of newspapers by readership ==
According to the Registrar of Newspapers for India, there are 1,10,851 registered publications in the Republic of India as of 31 March 2016. The figures below were compiled by the Media Research Users Council in the fourth quarter of the 2019 Indian Readership Survey.

Rank	Newspaper	Language	City	Average issue readership 2019 (in millions)	Owner
1	Dainik Jagran	Hindi	Various cities and states	16.872	Jagran Prakashan Limited
2	Dainik Bhaskar	Hindi	Various cities and states	15.566	D B Corp Ltd.
3	Hindustan	Hindi	Various cities and states	13.213	HT Media
4	Amar Ujala	Hindi	Various cities and states	9.657	Amar Ujala Ltd.
5	Malayala Manorama	Malayalam	Various cities and states, Dubai and Bahrain	8.478	Malayala Manorama Company Ltd.
6	Dina Thanthi	Tamil	Tamil Nadu, Bangalore, Pondicherry, Mumbai and Dubai	7.379	Founded by S. P. Adithanar
7	Lokmat	Marathi	Various cities in Maharashtra and Goa	6.285	Lokmat Media Limited
8	Rajasthan Patrika	Hindi	Various cities in Rajasthan & Delhi	5.863	Rajasthan Patrika Pvt. Ltd.
9	The Times of India	English	Various cities and states	5.560	The Times Group
10	Mathrubhumi	Malayalam	Kerala, Chennai, Bangalore, Mumbai, New Delhi	4.849	The Mathrubhumi Group
11	Eenadu	Telugu	Various cities and states	4.569	Ramoji Group
12	Sakal	Marathi	Various cities in Maharashtra	4.101	Sakal Media Group
13	Gujarat Samachar	Gujarati	7 cities in Gujarat and in Mumbai and New York City	3.265	Lok Prakashan Ltd.
14	Sakshi	Telugu	Various cities in Andhra Pradesh and Telangana	3.247	Jagati Publications Ltd.
15	Ananda Bazar Patrika	Bengali	West Bengal, Odisha, Jharkhand, Bihar, Delhi, Mumbai and other cities in India	3.032	Ananda Publishers
16	Dinamalar	Tamil	Various cities in Tamil Nadu	2.905	Dinamalar Publications Ltd.
17	Sandesh	Gujarati	5 cities in Gujarat and in Mumbai	2.884	The Sandesh Ltd.
18	Prabhat Khabar	Hindi	Various cities in Jharkhand, Bihar, and West Bengal	2.872	Neutral Publishing House Ltd.
19	Bartaman	Bengali	West Bengal, Odisha, Jharkhand, Bihar, Delhi, Mumbai and other cities in India	2.750	Bartaman Pvt. Ltd
20	Divya Bhaskar	Gujarati	Various cities in Gujarat	2.679	D B Corp Ltd.
21	Pudhari	Marathi	Various cities in Maharashtra	2.591	Pudhari Publications
22	Vijaya Karnataka	Kannada	Various cities in Karnataka	2.588	The Times Group
23	Dinakaran	Tamil	Various cities in Tamil Nadu	2.502	Sun Group
24	Punya Nagari	Marathi	Various cities in Maharashtra	2.455	Punya Nagari Newsgroup
25	Prajavani	Kannada	Various cities in Karnataka	2.135	The Printers (Mysore) Private Limited
26	Deshabhimani	Malayalam	Various cities in Kerala	2.094	Kerala State Committee of the Communist Party of India (Marxist)
27	Maharashtra Times	Marathi	Various cities in Maharashtra	1.701	The Times Group
28	The Hindu	English	Various cities and states	1.635	The Hindu Group
29	Andhra Jyothi	Telugu	Various cities in Telangana & Andhra Pradesh	1.628	Aamoda Publications Pvt. Limited
30	Punjab Kesari	Hindi	Various cities in Punjab, Haryana and Himachal Pradesh	1.138	
31	Teenmaar News Paper	Telugu	Various cities in Telangana	1.628	The Teenmaar News Publication
32	Hindustan Times	English	Various cities and states	1.543	HT Media

=== Dailies in India ===
- Top 10 Hindi Dailies
1. Dainik Jagran
2. Dainik Bhaskar
3. Amar Ujala
4. Rajasthan Patrika
5. Prabhat Khabar
6. Punjab Kesari
7. Patrika
8. Navabharat
9. Nai Dunia
10. Hari Bhoomi

Ref: Indian Readership Survey Q4 2019 pdf

- Top 10 English dailies
1. The Times of India
2. The Hindu
3. The Economic Times
4. The Telegraph
5. The Indian Express
6. The New Indian Express
7. Deccan Chronicle
8. Mid-Day
9. Mint
10. Deccan Herald

Ref: Indian Readership Survey Q1 2019 [1]

- Top 10 regional dailies
1. Daily Thanthi (Tamil)
2. Lokmat (Marathi)
3. Malayala Manorama (Malayalam)
4. Eenadu (Telugu)
5. Mathrubhumi (Malayalam)
6. Mandsaur Today ( Hindi)
7. Dinakaran (Tamil)
8. Anandabazar Patrika (Bengali)
9. Gujarat Samachar (Gujarati)
10. Sakal (Marathi)

Ref: Indian Readership Survey Q1 2019

=== Magazines in India ===
- Top 10 Hindi magazines
1. India Today
2. SamanyaGyan Darpan
3. Pratiyogita Darpan
4. Meri Saheli
5. Navodayans Heights
6. Bal Bhaskar
7. Champak
8. Sarita
9. Diamond Cricket Today
10. Cricket Samrat

Ref: Indian Readership Survey Q1 2019

- Top 10 English magazines
1. India Today
2. General Knowledge Today
3. The Sportstar
4. Diamond Cricket Today
5. Filmfare
6. Pratiyogita Darpan
7. Outlook
8. The Week
9. Time
10. Competition Success Review

Ref: Indian Readership Survey Q1 2019

- Top 10 regional magazines
1. Vanitha (Malayalam)
2. Ananda Vikatan (Tamil)
3. Mathrubhumi Arogya Masika (Malayalam)
4. Kumudam (Tamil)
5. Mathrubhumi Thozhilvartha (Malayalam)
6. Balarama (Malayalam)
7. Kungumam (Tamil)
8. Grihalakshmi
9. Manorama Thozhil Veedhi (Malayalam)
10. Puthiya Thalaimurai (Tamil)

Ref: Indian Readership Survey Q1 2019

== See also ==
- List of newspapers by circulation

== Bibliography ==
- Your Slip Is Showing: Indian Press Today by S Nihal Singh. South Asia Books, 1992.
