= Mass media in India =

Mass media in India consists of several different means of communication: television, radio, internet, cinema, newspapers and magazines. Indian media was active since the late 18th century; the print media started in India as early as 1780. Radio broadcasting began in 1927. Today much of the media is controlled by large corporations, which reap revenue from advertising, subscriptions, and sale of copyrighted material. With digital age in India, the fifth estate is also quickly gaining relevance, reach and influence, most notable among these being through social media platform, YouTube.

Freedom of press in India is a relevant issue due to increased centralization of media ownership, government control on media, violence against reporters as well as threats of prosecution enabled by laws that are written in vague terms or gives extraordinary powers to judiciary bodies.

India has over 500 satellite channels (more than 80 are news channels) and 70,000 newspapers, the biggest newspaper market in the world with over 100 million copies sold each day.

== Print ==
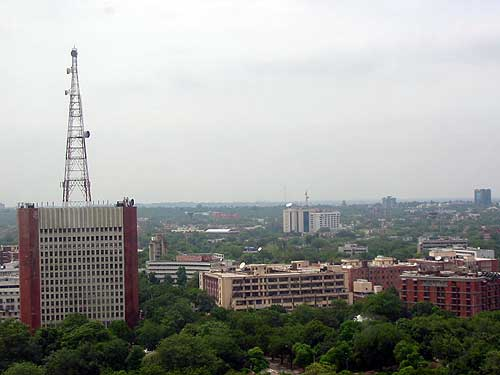
The headquarters of Doordarshan, for which experimental telecast started in September 1959. Regular daily transmission followed in 1965 as a part of All India Radio.

The first newspaper printed in India was Hicky's Bengal Gazette, started in 1780 under the British Raj by James Augustus Hicky. Other newspapers such as The India Gazette, The Calcutta Gazette, The Madras Courier (1785), and The Bombay Herald (1789) soon followed. These newspapers carried news of the areas under the British rule. The Bombay Samachar, founded in 1822 and printed in Gujarati is the oldest newspaper in Asia still in print. On 30 May 1826 Udant Martand (The Rising Sun), the first Hindi-language newspaper published in India, started from Calcutta (now Kolkata), published every Tuesday by Pt. Jugal Kishore Shukla.

During India's struggle for independence against the British, many national leaders such as Mahatma Gandhi, Netaji Subhas Chandra Bose, Raja Ram Mohan Roy, Bal Gangadhar Tilak and Annie Basant, used the press medium to disseminate their ideas and views of an independent nation, playing a crucial role in motivating the masses to participate in India's freedom movement.

Even after independence from Britain in 1947, the English-language papers were prominent due to a number of reasons. The telegraphic circuits of news agencies used the Roman Alphabet and the Morse code, giving the English press an advantage in speed. The speed of typesetting was also much slower in Indian languages because of the Diacritics. Also, the press largely relied on advertisements of imported goods for revenue, and the foreign advertisers naturally preferred English-language media. The language of the administration had also remained English.

Currently, India publishes about 1,000 Hindi dailies that have a total circulation of about 80 million copies. English, the second language in terms of a number of daily newspapers, has about 250 dailies with a circulation of about 40 million copies. The prominent Hindi newspapers are Dainik Jagran, Dainik Bhaskar, Amar Ujala, Devbhumi Mirror, Navbharat Times, Hindustan Dainik, Prabhat Khabar, Rajasthan Patrika, and Dainik Aaj.

In terms of readership, Dainik Jagran is the most popular Hindi daily with a total readership (TR) of 70,377,000, according to IRS Q1 2019. Dainik Bhaskar is the second most popular with a total readership of 51,405,000. Amar Ujala with a TR of 47,645,000, Rajasthan Patrika with a TR of 18,036,000 and Prabhat Khabar with a TR of 14,102,000 are placed at the next three positions. The total readership of the top 10 Hindi dailies is estimated at 188.68 million, nearly five times that of the top 10 English dailies that have a 38.76 million total readership.

The prominent English newspapers are The Times of India, founded in 1838 as The Bombay Times and Journal of Commerce by Bennett, Coleman and Co. Ltd, a colonial enterprise now owned by an Indian conglomerate; The Times Group. The Hindustan Times was founded in 1924 during the Indian Independence Movement ('Hindustan' being the historical name of India), it is published by HT Media Ltd. The Hindu was founded in 1878 by a group known as the Triplicane Six consisting of four law students and two teachers in Madras (now Chennai), it is now owned by The Hindu Group.

In the 1950s, 214 daily newspapers were published in the country. Out of these, 44 were English language dailies while the rest were published in various regional and national languages. This number rose to 3,805 dailies in 1993 with the total number of newspapers published in the country having reached 35,595.

The main regional newspapers of India include the Marathi language Lokmat, the Gujarati Language Gujarat Samachar, the Malayalam language Malayala Manorama, the Tamil language Daily Thanthi, the Telugu language Eenadu, the Kannada language Vijaya Karnataka and the Bengali language Anandabazar Patrika.

Newspaper sales in the country increased by 11.22% in 2007. By 2007, 62 of the world's best-selling newspaper dailies were published in China, Japan, and India. India consumed 99 million newspaper copies as of 2007, making it the second-largest market in the world for newspapers. The traditional print media, but also the television media, are largely family-owned and often partake in self-censorship, primarily due to political ties by the owner and the establishment.

== Broadcasting ==
Auguste and Louis Lumière moving pictures were screened in Bombay during July 1895, and radio broadcasting began in 1927. Radio broadcasting was initiated in 1927 but became a state responsibility only in 1930. In 1937 it was given the name All India Radio and since 1957 it has been called Akashvani. Limited duration of television programming began in 1959, and complete broadcasting followed in 1965. The Ministry of Information and Broadcasting owned and maintained the audio-visual apparatus—including the television channel Doordarshan—in the country prior to the economic reforms of 1991.

Following the economic reforms satellite television channels from around the world—including the BBC, CNN, CNBC, and other foreign television channels gained a foothold in the country. 47 million households with television sets emerged in 1993, which was also the year when Rupert Murdoch entered the Indian market. Satellite and cable television soon gained a foothold. Doordarshan, in turn, initiated reforms and modernisation. With 1,400 television stations as of 2009, the country ranks 4th in the list of countries by number of television broadcast stations.

== Communications ==
The Indian Government acquired ES EVM computers from the Soviet Union, which were used in large companies and research laboratories. Tata Consultancy Services – established in 1968 by the Tata Group – were the country's largest software producers during the 1960s. The 'microchip revolution' of the 1980s had convinced both Indira Gandhi and her successor Rajiv Gandhi that electronics and telecommunications were vital to India's growth and development. MTNL underwent technological improvements. Between 1986 and 1987, the Indian government embarked upon the creation of three wide-area computer networking schemes: INDONET (intended to serve the IBM mainframes in India), NICNET (network for the National Informatics Centre), and the academic research oriented Education and Research Network (ERNET).

The Indian economy underwent economic reforms in 1991, leading to a new era of globalisation and international economic integration. Economic growth of over 6% annually was seen between 1993 and 2002. The economic reforms were driven in part by significant the internet usage in India. The new administration under Atal Bihari Vajpayee which placed the development of Information technology among its top five priorities— formed the Indian National Task Force on Information Technology and Software Development. Internet gained a foothold in India by 1998. India had a total of 100 million Internet users—comprising 8.5% of the country's population—by 2010.

India had a total of 34 million fixed lines in use by 2011. In the fixed line arena, BSNL and MTNL are the incumbents in their respective areas of operation and continue to enjoy the dominant service provider status in the domain of fixed line services. BSNL controls 79% of fixed line share in the country.

In the mobile telephony sector, Bharti Airtel controls 24.3% subscriber base followed by Reliance Communications with 18.9%, Vodafone with 18.8%, BSNL] with 12.7% subscriber base as of June 2009. India had a total of 880 million mobile phone connections by 2011. Total fixed-line and wireless subscribers reached 688 million as of August 2010.

== Motion pictures ==
The history of film in India begins with the screening of Auguste and Louis Lumière's moving pictures in Bombay in July 1895. Raja Harishchandra, a full-length feature film, was initiated in 1912 and completed later. Alam Ara (released 14 March 1931), directed by Ardeshir Irani, was the first Indian movie with dialogue.

Indian films were soon being followed throughout Southeast Asia and the Middle East—where the modest clothing and subdued sexuality in these films were found to be acceptable to the sensibilities of audiences in the various Islamic countries of the region. As cinema as a medium gained popularity in India, as many as 1,000 films in the various languages of India were produced annually.

Hollywood also gained a foothold in India with special effects films such as Jurassic Park (1993) and Speed (1994) being specially appreciated by local audiences. Expatriates throughout the United Kingdom and the United States continued to give rise to international audiences for Indian movies, which, according to a 2008 Encyclopædia Britannica entry on Bollywood, "continued to be formulaic story lines, expertly choreographed fight scenes, spectacular song-and-dance routines, emotion-charged melodrama, and larger-than-life heroes".

Present-day India produces the most films of any country in the world. Major media investors in the country are production houses such as Yash Raj Films, Dharma Productions, Aamir Khan Productions, Disney India and Reliance Entertainment. Most of these productions are funded by investors, since there are limited banking and credit facilities in India for the motion picture industry. Many international corporations, such as Disney (formerly UTV) and Viacom (Network18 Studios), have entered the nation's media industry on a large scale.

== Ownership and funding ==
Digital media is opening up to paywalls and other subscription-based models. However, a majority of readers still do not pay for the content they read, causing media houses to rely on other means of funding.

The Independent and Public Spirited Media Trust is a syndicate that promotes media in India with the aim of creating a news content creation network. It was founded in 2015 and funds organisations such as The Wire, IndiaSpend, CGNet Swara, Alt News, and The Caravan. Omidyar Network has invested in Scroll.in and Newslaundry. Odisha TV is owned by the Panda Family, Baijayant Jay Panda. NewsLive in Assam is run by the wife of Himanta Biswa Sarma. The Caravan points out that NDTV, News Nation, India TV, News24 and Network18 are linked to Reliance. Another Indian billionaire businessman who funds media is Subhash Chandra.

== Criticism ==
Some sections of Indian media—controlled by businessmen, politicians, and government bureaucrats—are facing criticism for biased, motivated reporting, behaving as one-party-owned or governing-party-owned outlets, and selective presentation. After the devastating earthquake in Nepal on 25 April 2015, in spite of India helping, tweets from Nepal trended that effectively said, "Go home, Indian media". Disturbed by corruption, Delhi Chief Minister Arvind Kejriwal made a suggestion on 3 May 2015 to put Indian media outlets on public trial. On 8 May 2015, the then-I & B Minister, Arun Jaitley, echoed similar rhetoric, saying that there was a "flood of channels but dearth of facts". A lot of mainstream media channels have lately been accused of printing and telecasting unverified and biased information which they retracted later. In a few instances, content from parody accounts on Twitter were cited as sources. Indian mainstream media has often been accused of showing sensationalized news items. In March 2018, the then-Chief Justice of India Dipak Misra said that, "journalists cannot write anything they imagine and behave as if they are sitting in some pulpit". Godi media is a pejorative term coined and popularised by former NDTV journalist Ravish Kumar referring to sensationalist, biased Indian mainstream media outlets which have supported the ruling BJP government of India since 2014.

In a speech in July 2022, Chief Justice of India N. V. Ramana criticized Indian media outlets and accused them of running Kangaroo courts and running agenda-driven debates without any accountability, which he thinks is bad for democracy. A report by Oxfam and Newslaundry found out that general category employees constitute around 90% of leadership positions in the Indian media, which means that marginalized communities like Dalits, Adivasis and Bahujans do not have adequate representation.

The French NGO Reporters Without Borders compiles and publishes an annual ranking of countries based upon the organisation's assessment of its Press Freedom Index. In its 2023 downgraded India by 11 points to 161st level out of 180 countries, which places India below Afghanistan, Somalia and Colombia, and comparable to absolute dictatorships like Turkey and occupied state of Palestine, which has been criticized by Indian news outlets as well as officials. It stated its reason saying "The violence against journalists, the politically partisan media and the concentration of media ownership all demonstrate that press freedom is in crisis in “the world’s largest democracy”, ruled since 2014 by Prime Minister Narendra Modi, the leader of the Bharatiya Janata Party (BJP) and "the embodiment of the Hindu nationalist right." It also stated that Prime Minister Narendra Modi's Bharatiya Janata Party and their followers of Hindutva having greater exertion of control of the media.

Freedom House, a US-based NGO stated in its 2021 report that harassment of journalists increased under Modi's administration. The English-language media of India are described as traditionally left-leaning liberal, which has been a point of friction recently due to an upsurge in popularity of Hindu nationalist politics. According to BBC News, "A look at Indian news channels - be it English or Hindi - shows that fairly one-sided news prevails. And that side is BJP and Hindutva."

== See also ==
- Press Council of India
- List of television stations in India
- List of Indian-language radio stations
- List of magazines in India
- List of journalists killed in India
- Open access in India
- List of news media ownership in India
