= Dainik Jagran =

Indian Hindi language daily newspaper

Coordinates: 26.48050°N 80.30200°E

- Front page, 28 March 2010
- Type: Daily newspaper
- Format: Broadsheet
- Owners: Jagran Prakashan Limited; Dheerendra Kumar Maurya; Neeraj Mishra
- Founded: 1942; 84 years ago
- Political alignment: Right-wing; Populist; Majoritarian; Nationalist; Pro-Hindutva
- Language: Hindi
- Headquarters: Kanpur, Uttar Pradesh, India
- Country: India
- Circulation: 1,277,605 (as of April 2023)
- Price: ₹5 (5.2¢ US)
- OCLC number: 416871022
- Website: www.jagran.com

Dainik Jagran (Hindi: दैनिक जागरण, romanized: Dainika Jāgaraṇa, lit. 'The Daily Awakening') is an Indian Hindi-language daily newspaper. In terms of circulation, it was ranked 5th in the world in 2016 and 1st in India in 2022. In 2019 Quarter 4, according to Indian Readership Survey, Dainik Jagran reported a total readership of 68.6 million and was the top publication.

It is owned by Jagran Prakashan Limited, a publishing house listed on the Bombay Stock Exchange and the National Stock Exchange of India.

Dainik Jagran has been accused of spreading fake news and propaganda on many occasions.

== History ==
=== Origins ===
Dainik Jagran was first established in Jhansi, a district town in the United Provinces (later Uttar Pradesh), by Puran Chandra Gupta in 1942. Prior to this, Gupta had worked as the managing editor of a local magazine (1939–1942), during which he often travelled to Bombay to secure advertising, gaining contacts in the publishing industry. Shortly after its launch, publication was suspended during the Quit India Movement of 1942.

In 1946, Gupta decided that Dainik Jagran should be launched in the city of Lucknow, which was the capital of United Provinces. In preparation for the launch, he acquired a building on rent and sent machinery to be set up there but soon learned that the newspapers National Herald and Pioneer were in the midst of launching their first Hindi language editions Navjeevan and Swatantra Bharat in the same city. It prompted Gupta to quickly change his plans with the decision to launch the newspaper in Kanpur instead. The machinery was diverted to Kanpur, new premises rented out and the newspaper launched on 21 September 1947.

Dainik Jagran reflecting the beliefs of its founder, took a slightly right-wing line from its inception.

=== Early history ===
The newspaper faced financial problems in the beginning and Gupta had to borrow from his family to keep it running. He cut down on editorial costs by relying on syndicates which offered articles at cheaper rates and by getting free article submissions from political players and activists who were hungry for publicity. He was constantly visiting metropolitan cities to sell advertisement space in the newspaper, and hired reporters on a part-time basis during his visits for newsgathering in those cities. P. D. Gupta who was the younger brother of Puran Chandra launched two editions of the newspaper in Madhya Pradesh in the 1950s; the Rewa edition in 1953 and the Bhopal edition in 1956.

By the mid-1950s, Gupta had started making pitches for advertisements and advertising the Dainik Jagran itself. In the 1956 edition of The Indian Press Year Book, the newspaper was advertised as The Daily Jagran and claimed to have a circulation of 21,000 copies covering Uttar Pradesh and Vindhya Pradesh. Gupta registered the newspaper at the Registrar of Newspapers for India, joined the industry body Audit Bureau of Circulation and joined the publisher's club Indian and Eastern Newspaper Society (IENS) where he became an executive member by 1960. He also inducted his six sons into the newspaper's management while they were still in school.

==== Conflict with Aj and Emergency ====
In 1975, Dainik Jagran launched its Gorakhpur edition which brought it into direct conflict with the newspaper Aj. The Kanpur edition, run by Puran Chandra Gupta was covering four neighbouring districts from the city and had reached a limit where it could no longer increase its circulation in the regional market.

The newspaper had become financially secure and had liquid funds at hand, which led Gupta's sons to encourage him to look into expansion. They had thought of Gorakhpur as the first place to go as it did have a local newspaper or a newspaper edition that was based in the city at that time. Gorakhpur was instead being covered by the Varanasi-based Aj and the city lay within its circulation area. Aj itself had a monetary surplus and its editor Vinod Shukla was looking to expand the newspaper as he predicted that a single edition newspaper in Uttar Pradesh would become unviable in the long term. Shukla who had visited Kanpur in 1974 found Jagran to have carried very substandard content and expected an expansion attempt in the city to be easy. The paper had brought out printing machines for Kanpur in December and responded almost immediately after Jagran's Gorakhpur launch by launching its own Kanpur edition in April 1975.

The Kanpur edition of Aj had launched only two months before the imposition of Emergency rule and subsequent press censorship. Shivprasad Gupta, the owner of Aj was unsure about the expansion but Shukla supported by Gupta's son used the period as an opportunity to consolidate the newspaper. The Emergency created a demand for critical journalism which the newspaper provided and enabled it to make inroads in Jagran's market share. On the streets of Kanpur, fights broke out between men hired by the two newspapers who used weapons such as batons and improvised firearms against each other for control over offices, territory and distribution.

In midst of the conflict hawkers gained significant influence over the newspapers; initially Aj was charged a commission rate of 20% while Jagran was charged 30%, but the hawkers forced the former to increase its rate over the latter, marking the beginning of a period of fierce negotiations over commission rates and recurrent increases in the rates for both newspapers. Eventually the conflict ended when the two newspapers decided to join hands against the hawkers and pushed the commission rate back down to a fixed 30%.

During the Emergency, the circulation of Hindi newspapers rose significantly as a result of increased political consciousness and by 1977, the number of newspapers that were selling more 100,000 copies had risen to over 10 from a figure three before its imposition. Dainik Jagran and Aj were both among the new newspapers to join the 100,000+ club. The period had transformed the newspaper industry and regional language papers including that of Hindi became the face of the rapidly changing industry that would be transformed into mass media over the course of the following decades. Government policy was changed as well which facilitated the growth of the industry.

=== Expansion in Uttar Pradesh ===
Editions of Dainik Jagran in Uttar Pradesh as of 1990

The launch of Jagran's Gorakhpur edition marked the beginning of the newspaper's own period of rapid expansion. In 1979, the newspaper launched two editions in Lucknow and Allahabad. Vinod Shukla was hired to oversee the Lucknow edition and help them force its way into the Lucknow market, where the newspaper faced intense competition and pressures from trade unions. The Allahabad edition was shifted to Varanasi in 1981. The newspaper then entered the circulation area of Amar Ujala, launching a Meerut edition in 1984, an Agra edition in 1986 and a Bareilly edition in 1989. In 1989–90, Navbharat Times which dominated the circulation in Lucknow discontinued all its editions except the Bombay and Delhi editions after being hit by an eight month long shut-down in the cities of Lucknow and Patna. The discontinuation allowed Jagran to rapidly increase its circulation in the Lucknow region with minimal hindrance.

==== Mayawati daughter story (1995) ====
In December 1995, Dainik Jagran published a story with the claim that Mayawati, the leader of the Bahujan Samaj Party, had an illegitimate 12-year-old daughter. Published at the bottom of the first page in a short two column section, the story included claims that her daughter was hidden away in New Delhi and was borne out of a former "love marriage", based on an interview with a disgruntled member of the party. The newspaper went to the extent of calling Mayawati a "chamarin", a derogatory slur used for Dalit women.

Despite the story having been given less importance by the newspaper, it created a sensation as having an illegitimate child was a serious accusation for an unmarried woman and a question of virtue. In addition, Mayawati maintained a public image that she had denied herself family and children to fulfill the objectives of the Self-Respect Movement which sought equality for lower castes. The story caused resentment among Dalits and the Bahujan Samaj Party (BSP) which mainly drew support from them described it as the latest example of a Brahmin dominated press and establishment's constant mudslinging against lower castes. (Note: Dainik Jagran's story on Mayawati also revived earlier rumours that she had been in an illicit long term relationship with the founder Kanshi Ram, which contributed to the general depiction of Dalits as immoral people.) In Lucknow, supporters of the party demonstrated around the office of the newspaper, blockading it for a day. There were reports of violence during the protest and the author who wrote the piece was threatened.

The story also faced criticism from journalists and commentators. It was condemned as sensationalist journalism that was engaging in gossip about the private life of a female politician and disparaging her. The criticism was accompanied by questions on Dainik Jagran's ambitions of becoming a serious national newspaper and charges of the newspaper lacking journalistic ethics, professionalism and credibility. Some of the prominent critics included the chairman of the Press Council, Judge P. B. Sawant and the editor-in-chief of Jansatta, Prabash Joshi. K. Vikram Rao, the national chairman of a major journalist's union suggested that a more rigorous system was required, that a specialised training in journalism should be needed before a person could be employed by a newspaper and that the Press Council should have stronger tools for penalising journalists.

Staff at the newspaper strongly rejected the charges against the newspaper though they were apologetic about the story. Vinod Shukla, who was the resident editor in Lucknow was infuriated by the criticism, particularly that from Joshi and dismissed it as jealously during his editorial meetings. Narendra Mohan who was the owner and editor-in-chief of the newspapers at the time, responded to the criticism with an editorial. In the newspaper's defense, he stated that the newspaper itself was against this kind of journalism and he regretted that the story had been published but alleged that the fault lay on western norms influencing Indian journalism and on Mayawati herself who according to him used "ugly language" and was part of a trend where Indian politics had become unethical which had led to the situation.

In response to the protest by BSP supporters, journalists who were supportive of newspaper held their own protest against the party describing it to be in defense of press freedom. It was reported that several newspapers were going to boycott the party's campaign during the upcoming assembly election though the boycott was only upheld by Dainik Jagran. Some commentators noted that while journalists had frequently faced violence, generally from Hindutva groups, such an instance leading to a boycott was unique and had resulted from the only instance in which a newspaper had faced attacks from a Dalit group.

=== Later expansions ===
The Delhi edition of the Daink Jagran was launched in 1990. According to the then Chairman of Jagran Prakashan, Yogendra Mohan Gupta, his executives had advised him that in order to make Jagran a national newspaper, they had to launch an edition in Delhi. From the 1990s onwards, established Hindi language newspapers such as the Dainik Jagran, Dainik Bhaskar and Amar Ujala went on a multi edition expansion beyond their home states. The newspapers had a new generation of foreign educated heirs, generally sons or nephews of the older owners who unlike their predecessors took active interest in expansions, capital acquisition and partnerships. For Jagran, it was the second and third generation of the proprietors who charted the expansion and localisation strategy of the newspaper.

The expanding newspapers were motivated by the prospects of revenues that could be obtained by offering increased overall readership figures to advertisers. They copied the strategy that was devised by Samir Jain's The Times of India, a newspaper that had become extremely profitable by increasing marketing efforts, introducing colored newspapers while lowering cover prices that starting price wars and led to increase in circulation which in turn brought in high revenues from advertisements. Dainik Jagran also adopted a mass media content strategy of localisation through trivia laden local news, and employed local part time stringers for its newsgathering operations. The expansion efforts by the established newspapers led to increased localisation of news content across the Hindi belt but severely harmed stand-alone local newspapers who were unable to compete against them in terms of production or offers to advertisers. The changes however did not bring about any improvements in the working conditions, job security and professional autonomy of reporters. Most of them were kept as part timers and those who were granted regular positions were retained on a "hire-and-fire" basis. In 1992, Jagran had only 55 full time staff correspondents and 300 "working journalists" in a total staff strength of 700, the rest being stringers, regional correspondents, etc.

Jagran launched its Aligarh edition in 1993, the Dehradun edition in 1997 and the Jalandhar edition in 1999. In 1995, its circulation exceeded 0.5 million and the newspaper was being published from 12 locations across Uttar Pradesh and in New Delhi. In 1998, the newspaper received a competitive boost when the Prime Minister Atal Bihari Vajpayee gave an exclusive interview for it in midst of the Kargil War. The interview was later seen as an act of political patronage towards a newspaper that had remained loyal to Vajpayee and his Bharatiya Janata Party. In the National Readership Survey of 1999, Dainik Jagran was seen to have become the first Hindi language newspaper to feature in the top 5 newspapers in terms of readership, at a time when newspapers from southern India dominated the readership figures.

The launch of the Jalandhar edition in Punjab in 1999 was the first of a series of editions outside Uttar Pradesh and is described to have been the beginning of its real expansion. In 2000, the Dainik Jagran launched three editions in Hissar, Patna and Allahabad, and in the following year it launched an edition in Moradabad. In Patna, the capital of Bihar, the newspaper focused on crime stories and prioritised presenting the law and order situation in a negative light to its readers. When Uttaranchal became a state with Dehradun as its capital, Dainik Jagran’s circulation experienced a fourfold growth in the new state due to the increased commercial importance of the state's capital. In February 2003, the newspaper launched 3 editions in Jharkhand in the cities of Ranchi, Jamshedpur and Dhanbad. It was aggressively marketed and publicised but was unable to make a significant impact as Prabhat Khabar dominated the market in the state. Dainik Jagran launched editions in Bhagalpur and Panipat in the same year, two more editions in the cities of Ludhiana and Nainital in 2004 and then the Muzaffarpur, Dharamshala and Jammu editions in 2005.

In Punjab, the newspaper faced competition from the likes of Dainik Bhaskar, Amar Ujala and Hindustan, all of which expanded aggressively in the state. The rapid expansion by the 4 newspapers broke down the dominance of Punjab Kesari by 2005. In the meantime, commercial interests in the wake of the rapid rise of Hindi newspaper readership compelled the mainstream Hindi newspapers to moderate their adversarial stance towards backward and scheduled caste leaders. By 2006, the upper caste Chairman of Jagran Prakashan, Mahendra Mohan Gupta was vying for and received a Rajya Sabha nomination from the Samajwadi (Socialist) Party which was led by the backward-caste Chief Minister of Uttar Pradesh, Mulayam Singh Yadav who had also been an old adversary for the newspaper.

From 2004 onwards, Dainik Jagran had emerged as the newspaper with the largest readership, having displaced Dainik Bhaskar that had occupied the position since 2002. The two newspapers had maintained a tacit understanding since the beginning of their out of state expansion drives in the mid-1990s, that they would not encroach upon each other's territories. As a consequence, Jagran had not launched a new edition in Madhya Pradesh or Chhattisgarh while Bhaskar had not launched any editions in Uttar Pradesh, Bihar or Jharkhand. In the state of Madhya Pradesh, those who were subscribed to Dainik Jagran were primarily migrants who had come from Uttar Pradesh and wanted news from their native region. In 2006, the understanding between the two was broken by Jagran when the newspapers launched its Indore edition which marked the beginning of a period intense rivalry between the two. The new edition was unsuccessful in making in-roads in the market, unable to compete against the Indore edition of Dainik Bhaskar as well as the newspaper Nai Duniya that was based in the same city, while Bhaskar went on to launch its own edition in Jagran's territory. (Note: Jagran Prakashan eventually bought out the Indore based Nai Duniya in 2012 to establish a presence in Madhya Pradesh.) (Note: Dainik Bhaskar would respond to the launch of Dainik Jagran's Indore edition by launching its own editions in Ranchi, Jamshedpur, Dhanbad and Patna between 2010 and 2014.)

On 8 July 2006, Dainik Jagran also launched its Siliguri edition, just two days after the Nathu La mountain pass was opened with the expectation that the city would become a major commercial centre. The launch added to the intensification of competition in the region which lay beyond the Hindi belt and already had editions of the two Hindi newspapers, namely Prabhat Khabar and Rajasthan Patrika, the former of which was launched only a few months ago in March.

=== Government advertisements and shrinking readership ===
From the onset of Narendra Modi's tenure as the Prime Minister of India, government spending on advertisements in Dainik Jagran saw a sharp increase with exorbitant spending on regular advertisements. Between 2014–15 and 2018–19, the revenues generated solely from government advertisements of the Central Government was reported to have increased to over ₹100 crore (equivalent to ₹122 crore or US$13 million in 2026). The advertisement spending included political promotions and advertisements disguised as news items. In one instance, five full-page advertisements were published in the newspaper in the period between 25 and 27 May 2015 celebrating the one year anniversary of Modi government.

In one financial year, FY2017–18, the newspaper received ₹36.4 crore (equivalent to ₹45 crore or US$4.6 million in 2026) in ad revenue from the Central Government which was more than the combined ad revenue of ₹33.2 crore (equivalent to ₹41 crore or US$4.2 million in 2026) that the paper had received between 2010 and 2013, covering three financial years before Modi had come to power. Jagran's sister publications such as Mid-Day and Inquilab experienced similar increases in revenue from government advertisements. The advertisement spending by state governments of the ruling Bharatiya Janata Party, particularly the Uttar Pradesh Government whose advertisements regularly featured in the newspaper was not disclosed upon Right to Information (RTI) requests. The government also inducted Sanjay Gupta, the editor-in-chief of the newspaper into the board of Prasar Bharati, India's public broadcaster in 2020.

Per the Indian Readership Survey in 2019, Dainik Jagran's average issue readership fell by 17% from a figure of 20.3 million to 16.9 million. In Uttar Pradesh which stood as its biggest market, the readership fell from 12 million to 9.97 million while in the state of Bihar, it fell from 3.41 million to 2.97 million. The fall in readership was part of a general trend of fall in newspaper readership due to economic slowdown, only 3 out of the 10 newspapers with the largest readership did not experience a fall. One of them was its rival, Dainik Bhaskar which came close to displacing Jagran's position as the newspaper with the largest readership. Its readership had increased from 15.4 to 15.6 million with gains in Bihar. According to media watchdog Newslaundry, the Dainik Jagran was suffering from "falling credibility in a politically polluted atmosphere" among other issues.

=== Coronavirus pandemic and aftermath ===
On 22 March 2020, the COVID-19 lockdown in India was announced and it heavily impacted news publishers who were already strained due to the emergence of other forms of news media that had splintered audiences and due to the economic slowdown caused by demonetisation and GST. R. K. Agarwal, the CFO of Jagran Prakashan described the situation as a nightmare. Dainik Jagran adopted across the board cost cutting measures; the newspapers halved the number of pages and consolidated printing. It also started raising its cover prices whenever it could which Agarwal claimed was done to recover lost advertisement revenue.

In its pandemic reportage, the newspaper promoted conspiracy theories against Muslims and extensively publicised the Rashtriya Swayamsevak Sangh including through the publication of various articles authored by its senior leaders. The overall coverage lacked transparency, journalistic ethics, accuracy and factual reporting. The reportage prioritised stories on Tablighi Jamaat publishing 230 of them on its frontpage including 120 above the fold and blamed Muslims for the pandemic. The newspaper created a narrative that the government was well prepared and had brought the pandemic under control but simultaneously presented the idea that Muslims were intentionally spreading the virus which had led to the nation losing the "battle against coronavirus". Muslims were dehumanised as the "nation's enemies" and depicted as uncivilised violent people who attacked healthcare professionals and violated lockdown measures.

Dainik Jagran's coverage largely ignored and distracted from issues such as the mass exodus of migrant workers, low testing rates, the lack of PPE kits and ventilators in hospitals and general mismanagement by the government. It instead condemned opposition parties that criticised the Bharatiya Janata Party (BJP) government's management and accused them of spreading "negativity" at a time when the government was dealing with a "war-like situation". The newspaper itself criticised measures taken by state governments with an opposition party or coalition in power while praising similar measures taken in Bharatiya Janata Party ruled states.

==== Mass burials story (2021) ====
During second wave of the pandemic, national news publishers such as Dainik Bhaskar, India Today magazine and Mojo Story, and international ones such as Reuters and BBC had published reports and images of mass burials on the banks of the river Ganga and bodies floating all across the river caused by people's inability to afford crematoriums that were severely overburdened from Coronavirus related deaths.

On 23 May 2021, Dainik Jagran published a frontpage story that claimed that the mass burials were normal, that no increase in deaths had occurred and that those who were buried had died of leprosy and snake bites, dismissing the reports from other news publishers as mere sensationalism. The story included a comparison of a recent image with an image that it claimed was taken three years ago from a mass burial at the Shringverpur ghat in Prayagraj and on its basis falsely stated that most images of mass burials at the ghat were taken before the pandemic. According to the news piece, Jagran had employed a five-man team who made finding after covering over a dozen villages along a 70 km stretch on the Ganga, which included the Phaphamau and Shringverpur ghats. The story was highlighted by BJP politicians including the Chief Minister Yogi Adityanath and then followed by a series of reports from the newspaper between late May to early June that attempted to reinforce the same idea. The newspaper before publishing the 23 May piece had previously published news reports which contradictorily stated that there was an increase in mass burials and coronavirus related deaths.

In June, a journalistic investigation was conducted into the claims made by Dainik Jagran that found their claims did not match ground realities and noted that the newspaper was known to have been receiving large revenues through government advertisements and disguising them as news. The investigation could not verify the age of the old image but it was found that the image was taken at a different location. Independent journalist Prashant Singh conducted several interviews with pandits, pandas (household priests), gravediggers and other locals at the two ghats who all confirmed that while some burials had always occurred, they had never seen such a large scale increase in their numbers before the pandemic. The investigative report was published by the fact checking organisation Alt News, which was supported by Prayagraj-based photojournalist Prabhat Kumar Verma, Aaj Tak reporter Shivendra Srivastav who had covered Phaphamau ghat and government data related to local management. Alt News contacted reporters at Dainik Jagran's Prayaraj edition who refused to comment on the story but two of them confirmed that there was an unprecedented increase in the number of mass burials.

In response to the Alt News report, Dainik Jagran filed a defamation case against the organisation claiming that the report had made disparaging remarks about the newspaper and forwarded a plea that the report should be suppressed for the duration of the case. On 1 November 2021, the Delhi High Court squashed the plea stating that there was "no reason to intervene and stifle free speech", noting the interviews that the report was based on and stated the report was within the ambit of public interest.

== Organisation ==
Sanjay Gupta is the chief executive officer and editor-in-chief of the newspaper. Since 2020, he has also been appointed by the Modi government to the board of Prasar Bharati, India's public broadcaster.

The news staff consists of a large number of local stringer informants who obtain news items from small towns and villages, for the newspaper's sub-edition pages containing district specific news. The stringers generally do not have qualifications in journalism.

== Misinformation ==
=== Paid news ===
Dainik Jagran was first named in a 2010 report to the Press Council of India as one of the newspapers publishing undisclosed paid news for celebrities, politicians and companies.

The newspaper publishes advertisements disguised as news reports for the Yogi Adityanath government. The advertisements copy the newspaper's general news report style and are usually published on the front pages. They are sometimes accompanied with bylines to Dainik Jagran's staff, some of whom have been identified to be members of the newspaper's marketing team. The contents of the advertorial advertisements include laudatory reports of the government's activities, quotes from apparent residents praising the government and statements made by Bharatiya Janata Party politicians presented as facts without any attribution. Several of the newspaper's own news reports were repurposed into government advertisements at a later date and presented as new stories, which according to media analyst Vineet Kumar brings into question the credibility of its general reportage as well. Some of the advertorial reports have been found to be duplicates of reports which were earlier published as news items by outlets such as Zee News and the newspaper Uday Bhoomi.

=== Editorial stance ===
Dainik Jagran is a right-wing populist, hypernationalist, pro-hindutva and majoritarian newspaper, that espouses the Hindutva and Hindu nationalist ideology. The newspaper has never openly admitted to any leanings and claims that it is neutral in its political orientation.

The newspaper has consistently espoused a nativist rhetoric of identity politics for the construction of a temple dedicated to Rāma at the site of Ram Janmabhoomi (transl. Birthplace of Rama) through its opinion-editorials and in editorialised news reports.

=== Criticism ===
Dainik Jagran observed silence over Delhi violence and was accused of suppressing the incident.

Dainik Jagran is also accused of running false narratives in support of the BJP government. It ran a news covering Hathras gangrape and murder incident declaring it as a false case of rape and tried to defend the rapists which were later refuted by the CBI when it said that gangrape did occur and the state tried to do a cover-up.

Dainik Jagran is accused of running smear campaigns against Indian mathematician and educationalist, Anand Kumar printing false news about his institution called Super 30.

Dainik Jagran demonised and ran a smear campaign against activist Afreen Fatima when UP officials demolished her house, including claiming that she expressed her support for terrorist Afzal Guru.

=== Fabricated news ===
In August 2023, Dainik Jagran reported that Indian army carried out a "surgical strike" in the Pakistan-administered Kashmir region. The report was debunked by the Indian army officials saying there was no truth in any of the claims.

=== False reporting ===
In Seemanchal ka Sach series (late 2022), Jagran alleged large-scale migration of Hindus from certain villages and Muslim infiltrators dominance. Ground investigation found many claims to be false, afterwards Jagran denied its involvement in the series and cited misuse of its logo.

=== Misinformation regarding criminal activities ===
On April 20, 2018; Danik Jagran, published ‘Bada Khulasa: Kathua me bachi se nahi hua tha Dushkaram’ (trans. Big expose: Kathua girl was not raped). The story written by Advesh Chauhan from Jammu claimed that the eight-year-old Bakarwal girl from Kathua was not raped. Critiques mentioned this was as part of a campaign to peddle Hindutva ideology.

== Dainik Jagran trademark dispute ==
The trademark name "Dainik Jagran" is the subject of an ongoing civil lawsuit initiated by the G. D. Gupta family against Jagran Prakashan in 2007 . The G. D. Gupta family are the controlling shareholders of Jagran Publications Pvt. Ltd., an associate company which publishes the Rewa and Bhopal editions. According to the lawsuit, the P. C. Gupta family controlled Jagran Prakashan is making unauthorised use of the trademark name and has laid a false claim of exclusive rights over it. On the basis of a family partition dating back to 12 June 1951 and an additional agreement signed on 10 January 1976, the lawsuit states that the trademark name is jointly owned by the lineal descendants of the three brothers, namely J. C. Arya, G. D. Gupta and P. C. Gupta, and not solely by the P. C. Gupta family. The J. C. Arya family own the associate company Dainik Jagran LLP which publishes the Jhansi edition of the newspaper.

The lawsuit was started by Madan Mohan Gupta backed by several other members of the family and they applied for an injunction seeking an interim restraining order over the use of the trademark name. In 2010, Sanjeev Mohan Gupta, the director of Jagran Publications Pvt. Ltd., also appealed to the Foreign Investment Promotion Board (FIPB) seeking rejection of Jagran Prakashan's holding company transferring shares to Blackstone Group that was planning on investing in the company. S. M. Gupta stated that the unauthorised transfer of shares without consultation with the associate companies adversely affected them and would lead to brand dilution, adding that while the case was being litigated at the High Court of Delhi, the transfer would create third party interests in it.

Jagran Prakashan rejected all claims made by the lawsuit, contesting that the two agreements had any impact over the rights and reiterated its claim of exclusive rights on the trademark name. Responding to the appeal at FIPB, the company contested that the transfer of shares related to a different entity and did not concern the subject matter of the litigation. In light of the fact that 35 out of the 39 editions of Dainik Jagran are registered under Jagran Prakashan, the court did not find sufficient grounds for an interim restraining order on the use of the trademark name. The company has also been allowed to go ahead with its transfer of shares and others mergers and acquisitions while the case continues to be litigated in court.

== See also ==
- Halla Bol campaign
