= Darpan =

Darpan (meaning mirror in several Indic languages) and may refer to:

== People ==
- Darpan Inani (born 1994), Indian chess player
- Syed Ishrat Abbas ("Darpan", 1928–1980), Pakistani film actor

== Media ==
- Darpan (1970 film) a 1970 Indian Hindi-language film
- Darpan Chhaya, a 2001 Nepalese film
  - Darpan Chhaya 2, a 2017 Nepalese film
- Badmash Darpan, a Bhojpuri-language book by Teg Ali Teg
- Jagat Darpan, a newspaper in Gujarat, India
- Maya Darpan, a 1972 Indian Hindi-language film
- Nil Darpan, a Bengali-language play written by Dinabandhu Mitra in 1858–1859
- Pratiyogita Darpan, an Indian bilingual magazine
- Samachar Darpan, a defunct Bengali weekly newspaper

== Other ==
- Shaala Darpan, an ICT programme of Ministry of Human Resource Development, India
