= Rachel Goenka =

Indian restaurateur, chef, author

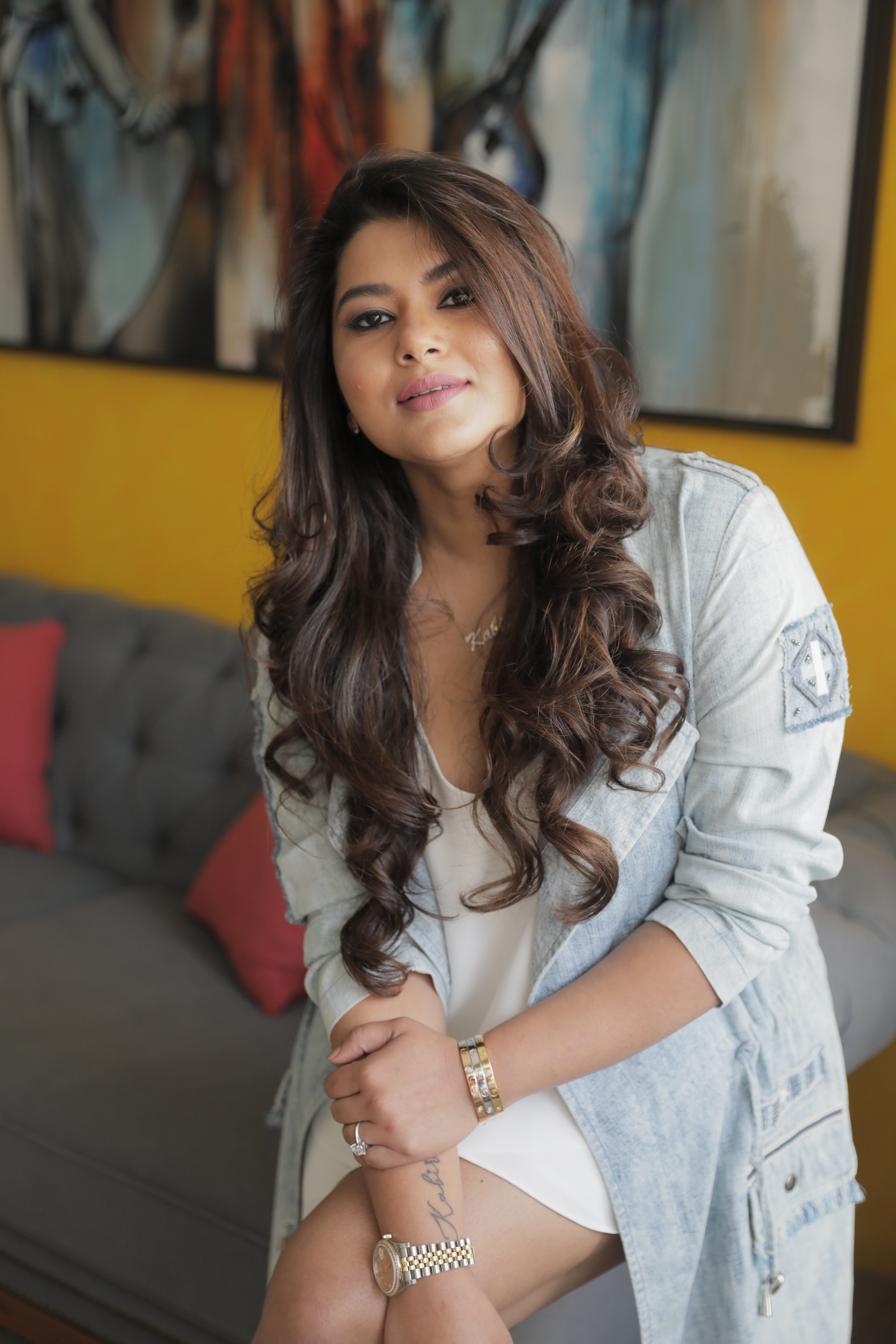
- Rachel Goenka
- Born: 6 April 1988 (age 38)
- Other name: Ms Sassy
- Education: Pennsylvania State University; Ballymaloe Cookery School; Le Cordon Bleu
- Occupations: Restaurateur, Chef, Author
- Organization: TCSC Hospitality
- Known for: The Sassy Spoon, House of Mandarin, Baraza, 8ish, Sassy Teaspoon and Asian Bistro by HOM
- Notable work: Adventures with Mithai (2019)
- Father: Viveck Goenka
- Relatives: Ramnath Goenka (great-grand father)
- Awards: The Gourmand World Cookbook Award, 2020

Rachel Goenka is an Indian restaurateur, chef, author and the founder and CEO of Mumbai based TCSC Hospitality. She runs a chain of restaurants such as The Sassy Spoon, a multi-cuisine restaurant, House of Mandarin, a Pan-Asian diner, Baraza, a resto-bar, 8ish, a cocktail bar, Asian Bistro by HOM, a Pan-Asian kiosk, and Sassy Teaspoon, a chain of patisseries and bakeries, across Mumbai and Pune.

She is the author of Adventures with Mithai: Indian Sweets Get a Modern Makeover (2019), by HarperCollins. Goenka serves as the head of the National Restaurant Association of India's Mumbai chapter.

== Early life and education ==
Goenka grew up in Dubai and attended Emirates International School, and made regular visits to Mumbai and Goa. She graduated with degrees in Journalism and English from The Pennsylvania State University. She studied at the Ballymaloe Cookery School in Ireland under chef Rachel Allen and later attended Le Cordon Bleu in London, specialising in patisserie.

== Career ==
She set up her first restaurant, The Sassy Spoon in Mumbai's Nariman Point in 2013, which was later chosen by French chef Alain Ducasse to be part of the Gout De France movement in 2014. Her second outlet of The Sassy Spoon was opened in Bandra, Mumbai in 2015.

In 2016, Goenka launched the Sassy Teaspoon, a chain of patisseries and bakeries across Mumbai and Pune. The Sassy Spoon, Mumbai won 'Best Independent Restaurant in India-Critics' Choice' within the first year of its operations.

In 2017, she launched The Sassy Spoon and Baraza in Pune, and House of Mandarin in Bandra. In 2019, she opened The Sassy Spoon and House of Mandarin in Powai. She owns six restaurants across Mumbai and Pune, and six patisseries and two central kitchens.

In 2020, she was inducted as a managing committee member of the National Restaurant Association of India and was later appointed as the head of its Mumbai chapter for the year 2025–26.

During the COVID-19 pandemic, she launched Saffron by The Sassy Spoon, a delivery-only Indian cuisine brand.

In 2025, Goenka entered the bar segment with the launch of 8ish, a cocktail bar in Nariman Point, Mumbai. The same year, she repositioned Baraza in Pune as a beer garden-style restaurant.

== Published works ==
In 2019, she authored a book, Rachel Goenka's Adventures with Mithai, which was published by HarperCollins. The book was launched on 14 October 2019, in Mumbai. In December 2019, she won The Gourmand World Cookbook Award 2020, in the category of pastry and desserts for her book, Adventures with Mithai. The book was earlier named the national winner for India in the same category.

=== Reception ===
The book received positive reviews from critics. Writing for The Indian Express, Sourish Bhattacharyya described it as "a cross-cultural treat" and praised its "impressive repertoire" of reinterpretations of Indian sweets. The book was also reviewed by Outlook Traveller, where Sharmistha Chaudhuri described it as a "picture-heavy, gorgeous book" and noted its collection of recipes that reinterpret traditional Indian sweets for a contemporary audience.

A book review published in The Hindu, Aparna Narrain wrote that the book adapts traditional Indian ingredients for a Western palate and presents festive sweets in contemporary forms, adding that the recipes are accessible to home bakers and include dishes such as Kaju Katli Truffles and Nagaland’s black rice pudding.

== Personal life ==
In February 2014, Goenka married her long-time boyfriend, Dubai-based banker Karan Khetarpal, with whom she has a son, Kabir. In April 2021, on her birthday, Goenka and Karan welcomed their daughter, Amalia. She is the daughter of Viveck Goenka, the chairman & MD of The Indian Express.

== Awards and recognition ==
In 2018, she was named Young Restaurateur of the Year at the Restaurant India Awards. In 2019, she was listed by AsiaOne magazine among its Woman Empowerment Leaders. She was also named Woman Entrepreneur of the Year at The Times of India’s Times Food and Hospitality Icons.

In April 2023, she received the Restaurateur of the Year (Female) award at the West India edition of the Food Connoisseurs India Convention. She was awarded Young Restaurateur of the Year (West) by The Economic Times at the ET Hospitality World Restaurant and Nightlife Awards in 2023.
