= GetVidya =

Indian charitable organisation

- Company type: Non-profit Charity
- Industry: Non-profit, Charity, Education, Economic Development
- Founded: Mumbai, India (April 2007)
- Headquarters: Bangalore, India
- Area served: India
- Key people: Vishal Singh and Ankur Goenka
- Website: https://www.getvidya.in

GetVidya was a registered (Act 21, 1860) non-profit charitable trust under government of India and worked to spread education and support schools and young students, especially the have-nots of Indian society. GetVidya was founded in April 2007 by few students of IIT Bombay and IT BHU. The website is no longer accessible as of June ― 2016.

GetVidya was an organisation committed to spread education amongst underprivileged and special children of different statures of the society in order to bring them on a common platform with the rest of the society.

== History ==
GetVidya started with an aim to promote free education to engineering entrance aspirants preparing for IIT JEE, AIEEE, etc. and continued to do so until mid-2010. During this time it gave free study material, online coaching, free tests/quizzes, information on books and exams along with answering doubts of young students online from their hostel rooms. It made several hundreds of videos freely available for students. It got close to 30,000 registered users during this time. Around mid-2010, it started to develop training programs and tools to keep underprivileged children interested in studies. GetVidya developed an interactive educational software, "Kiddo", that helps teachers create innovative quizzes and then use it to interactively teach various subjects through computers. The software is highly flexible and the teachers can create their own content, questions, answers etc. This leaves a long lasting impression on the mind of the child and help him retain the information much longer as compared to books. GetVidya distributes this software free of cost and conducts free teacher training sessions so that the teachers can use the software to its fullest potential. It has given this software to a couple of NGOs and more than 40 schools across India.

GetVidya also developed another software called "Autisto" that asks questions and provides answers using only images, animations and sound. This software is targeted to help teach kids with Autism. Autistic kids have significant problems in reading and hence they need special means of teaching through images and sound. GetVidya distributes Autisto free of cost to Autism centers and schools catering to children with special needs. As the software is open source the teacher has immense flexibility to put any image or sound she wishes. This makes learning very empathetic. The teachers can put images related to the kid's parents, siblings and home which helps the kid to relate to these teaching fairly easily. GetVidya has given this software to about 17 autism centers in Bangalore, Chandigarh, Delhi, Mumbai, Pune and Hyderabad. It also does extensive training of the teachers of the centers to ensure they are enabled to fully use the software.

== Products ==
Kiddo, Autisto, Screamer

== Team ==
GetVidya was essentially a student run enterprise turned into an organisation focused to help the young kids. The team consisted of young professionals and primarily students from IITs. GetVidya had about 50,000 registered members and had recorded about 1 million page views in September 2011.

== Recognition ==
GetVidya was praised by many national newspapers such as Deccan Chronicle, Rajasthan Patrika, Indian Express, etc. and other leading social organisations for its work towards needy children.
