= Sanjay Salil =

TV journalist and presenter

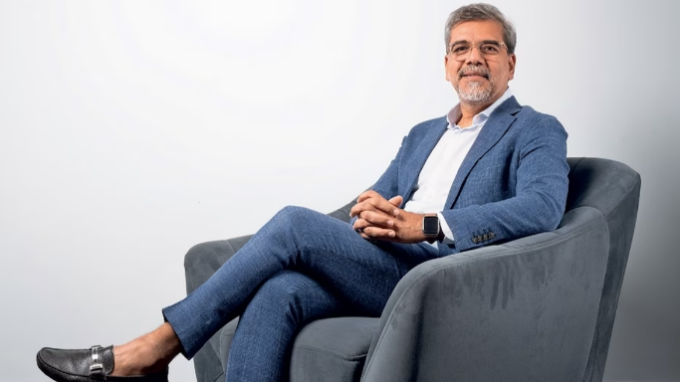
- Sanjay Salil
- Born: 2 May 1970 (age 56); Nalanda, Bihar, India
- Occupations: Entrepreneur, businessperson, investor
- Title: Media entrepreneur, founder and managing director of MediaGuru and co-founder at IntellAI

Sanjay Salil (born 2 May 1970) is a prominent media entrepreneur currently serving as the managing director of MediaGuru. He transitioned from a successful broadcasting career to entrepreneurship, founding MediaGuru Consultants Pvt Ltd nearly two decades ago. Under his leadership, MediaGuru has become one of the top global media services companies. Sanjay has overseen the launch of numerous broadcasting stations and media ventures across Asia, the Middle East, and Africa. He has provided consulting services to some of the world's leading broadcasters and media companies on technology, content, monetization, and business strategy.

In 2023, Sanjay co-founded IntellAI, an AI and Quantum company, alongside leading AI and Quantum scientists, including his co-founder, Utpal Chakravarti. IntellAI collaborates with a prestigious Indian university to advance research in Quantum Technology.

== Early life ==
Sanjay Salil was born in a small village in the Jehanabad district of Bihar. He completed his schooling and undergraduate studies in Nalanda, Bihar, and earned a Bachelor of Arts in journalism from Makhanlal Chaturvedi National University, where he was part of the first graduating batch (1991–1992).

== Education ==
- Bachelor of Arts (Hons), Magadh University, Bihar
- Bachelor of Arts in journalism, Makhan Lal Chaturvedi National Journalism University, Bhopal

== Professional career ==
Sanjay's professional journey began as a print journalist with Amar Ujala and Headlines News Agency from 1992 to 1995. He later held leadership positions, including executive producer at AajTak, India's first private TV news channel, and joint CEO of Falak TV, where he founded the country's first Urdu-language news channel.

In 2003, Sanjay founded MediaGuru, demonstrating exceptional foresight in predicting the growth of electronic media in South Asia. Over two decades, MediaGuru has launched over 20 state-of-the-art news channels and collaborated with more than 50 news organizations globally. The company provides strategic consulting on digitization monetization, distribution, digital transformation, and turnkey projects, including launching news stations, media training for journalists, and offering technical solutions.

As a co-founder of IntellAI, Sanjay works with top scientists in India to deliver generative AI-based products and services to large public and private enterprises. One of IntellAI's notable products is Ultimeet, a meeting management and productivity platform designed to enhance collaboration and efficiency. The company also offers Voice Biometrics and Language Translation Solutions and provides consulting services in Quantum computing. Sanjay and his co-founder, Utpal Chakraborty, have recently filed a patent for their invention "Enhancing and Automating Online and Offline Meeting Communication."

== Achievements ==
Sanjay is recognized as a top media influencer, sharing his expertise at global forums such as the FIAT IFTA World Conference, CABSAT, Saudi Media Forum, Guardian Activate Summit, Big Tent Summit, IBC conference, AIB, ABU Digital Broadcasting Summit, and Asia Media Summit.

Featured in India Today's "From Zero to Hero" cover story on top 20 entrepreneurs, Sanjay has served on the jury for prestigious awards such as the International Emmy Awards, Association of International Broadcasting Awards, and ABU Broadcast Engineering Excellence Awards. His insights and interviews have been published in global outlets like Business Standard, Bloomberg, CNN, The Washington Post, and Mint – The Wall Street Journal. He was highlighted as a successful entrepreneur in the book "Small Big Bang," written by students of the Indian Institute of Management (IIM).

Sanjay has been honored with the title “Doctor of Excellence” by KEISIE International University, South Korea, for his expertise in Business Administration, Management, and Media.
