= Halla Bol campaign =

Halla Bol ("Raise Your Voice") was a campaign started in 1994 by then Chief minister of Uttar Pradesh and leader of Samajwadi Party Mulayam Singh Yadav against two Hindi newspapers, Dainik Jagran and Amar Ujala, which together they shared nearly 70 per cent of the Uttar Pradesh state's Hindi newspaper readership. The newspapers remained defiant and stepped up their campaign against the government in response to the anti-reservation agitation in the hills (now Uttarakhand).

On 12 October 1994 addressing a public meeting Mulayam Singh Yadav denounced the two papers, "Halla Bol", he exhorted his followers, "Commence the storming". Why read them, he told them, you don't have to even see them. No one present had any doubt what they meant: Don't let them be seen, that is what it meant."

After that call, hawkers and newsagents selling the two papers were attacked by party workers. Journalists of the two papers were beaten up. Vehicles carrying Jagran were waylaid and burnt. The house of the editor of Amar Ujala was attacked. Advertisements to the papers were cut. Thousands of copies of the papers were torched. The state government also imposed a ban on the release of government advertisements to the newspapers.

The national press did not take note of this assault on the freedom of press. Hindustan Times ran an editorial with the headline, "Stop this halla bol".
