= Khalid A. H. Ansari =

Indian businessman and journalist

Khalid Abdul Hamid Ansari
- Occupations: Businessman, Journalist
- Title: Chairman of the Mid-Day Group and Inquilab Publications Ltd
- Parent: Abdul Hamid Ansari (father)
- Awards: Padma Shri (2001)

Khalid Abdul Hamid Ansari is an Indian businessman and journalist. He is the Chairman of the Mid-Day Group of publications based in Mumbai, and of Inquilab Publications Ltd. He is the son of Abdul Hamid Ansari, an independence activist and Congressman, who founded The Inquilab Publications Ltd. in 1938 during the freedom movement. He was awarded the Padma Shri in 2001, and has also written a number of books on cricket.

== Bibliography ==
- Sachin: Born to Bat - 2012.
- Cricket at fever pitch - 2015.
