= Madhav Yeshwant Gadkari =

Indian journalist (1928–2006)

- Born: 25 September 1928; Mumbai, Maharashtra, India
- Died: 1 June 2006 (aged 77); Mumbai, Maharashtra, India
- Occupation: Journalist
- Known for: Journalism
- Children: Three daughters and a son
- Awards: Padma Shri

Madhav Yeshwant Gadkari (1928–2006) was an Indian journalist and the editor of Loksatta, a popular Marathi daily published by the Indian Express Group. He was also associated with the All India Radio, Maharashtra Times, Sakal and their Goa edition, Gomantak Times during his career. The Government of India awarded him the fourth highest civilian award of Padma Shri in 1990.

== Biography ==
Gadkari was born into Chandraseniya Kayastha Prabhu (CKP) family on 25 September 1928 in Mumbai, in the Western Indian state of Maharashtra. His first known posting was with the All India Radio. Later, he worked with Maharashtra Times, and moved on to Sakal and their Goan edition, Gomantak Times. Subsequently, he joined Loksatta and became its Group Editor in 1991. After his retirement from service in 1992, he continued freelance writing and contributed a column in the city based newspaper, Mumbai Chaufer, till 1997.

Gadkari was in the news on more than one occasion. On 20 December 1990, a bomb blast took place in his house following which a few Rashtriya Swayamsevak Sangh and Vishwa Hindu Parishad supporters were arrested. In 2004, he was again in the news when a group of known personalities including Subhash Bhende, Sadashiv Amrapurkar and himself, filed a public interest litigation at the Mumbai High Court, seeking disenfranchisement of the Mumbai slum dwellers. He was awarded the civilian honour of the Padma Shri by the Government of India in 1990.

Gadkari died on 1 June 2006, aged 78, at his Mumbai residence, leaving behind his wife, three daughters and a son.

== See also ==
- Loksatta
- Sakal
