= Karpoor Chandra Kulish =

Indian newspaper founder

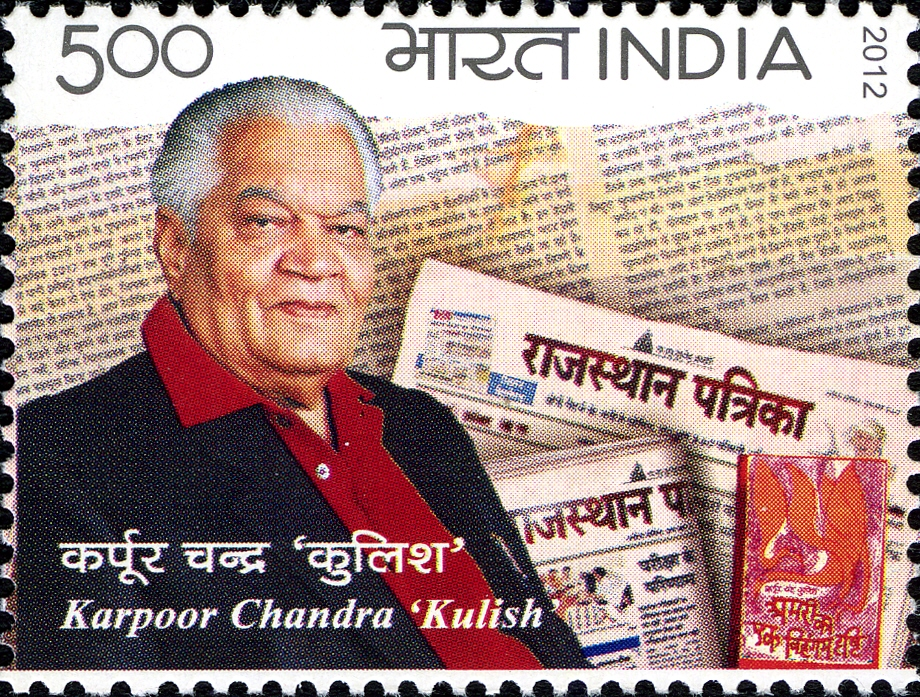
- Kulish on a 2012 stamp of India
- Born: 20 March 1926; Malpura, Tonk, Rajasthan, India
- Died: 17 January 2006 (aged 79); Jaipur, Rajasthan, India
- Occupations: Founder of Rajasthan Patrika, Journalist, Poet, Philosopher

Karpoor Chandra Kulish (20 March 1926 – 17 January 2006) was the founder of Rajasthan Patrika, a Hindi language newspaper of Rajasthan, India.

India Post released a stamp commemorating him on 16 May 2012.
