= General Knowledge Today =

Current affairs

- Categories: Magazines
- Frequency: Monthly
- Circulation: 109,000
- Country: India
- Language: English
- Website: www.gktoday.in

General Knowledge Today (also known as CSR G.K. Today and GK Today) is an Indian monthly magazine which targets students. It has a circulation of 109,000. According to the Indian Readership Survey in 2019, it is one of the top 20 magazine published in India. Similarweb reported that its website has 4.2 million views.

== External ==
- Official website
