= Sandesh (Indian newspaper) =

Indian Gujarati daily newspaper

- Type: Daily newspaper
- Format: Broadsheet
- Owner: The Sandesh Ltd.
- Editor: Ajay M. Naik
- Founded: 1923
- Language: Gujarati
- Headquarters: Sandesh Bhavan, Lad Society Rd, B/h. Vastrapur Gam, Ahmedabad, Gujarat 380015
- City: Ahmedabad
- Country: India
- Readership: 8,256,000
- OCLC number: 64278023
- Website: www.sandesh.com
- Free online archives: sandeshepaper.in

Sandesh is a Gujarati daily newspaper that started publications in Ahmedabad, Gujarat in 1923. It has the second largest readership in Gujarat as of 2019 according to the Indian Readership Survey. The paper focuses coverage on local and regional stories consequential to the various city editions in print, published from Surat, Vadodara, Rajkot, Bhavnagar, and Bhuj. The newspaper was purchased from the founder in 1958 by Chimanbhai S. Patel and has since been a core business division of 'The Sandesh Limited'.

Sandesh publishes several supplements and also prints Gujarati weekly editions and Sandesh International from Chicago, Illinois, United States.

== TV channel ==
The paper's parent company also launched a Gujarati news channel, Sandesh News, on 24 October 2013 as adaptation to the changing news media landscape.
