= Viveck Goenka =

Chairman, Managing Director and Editorial Director of the Indian Express Group

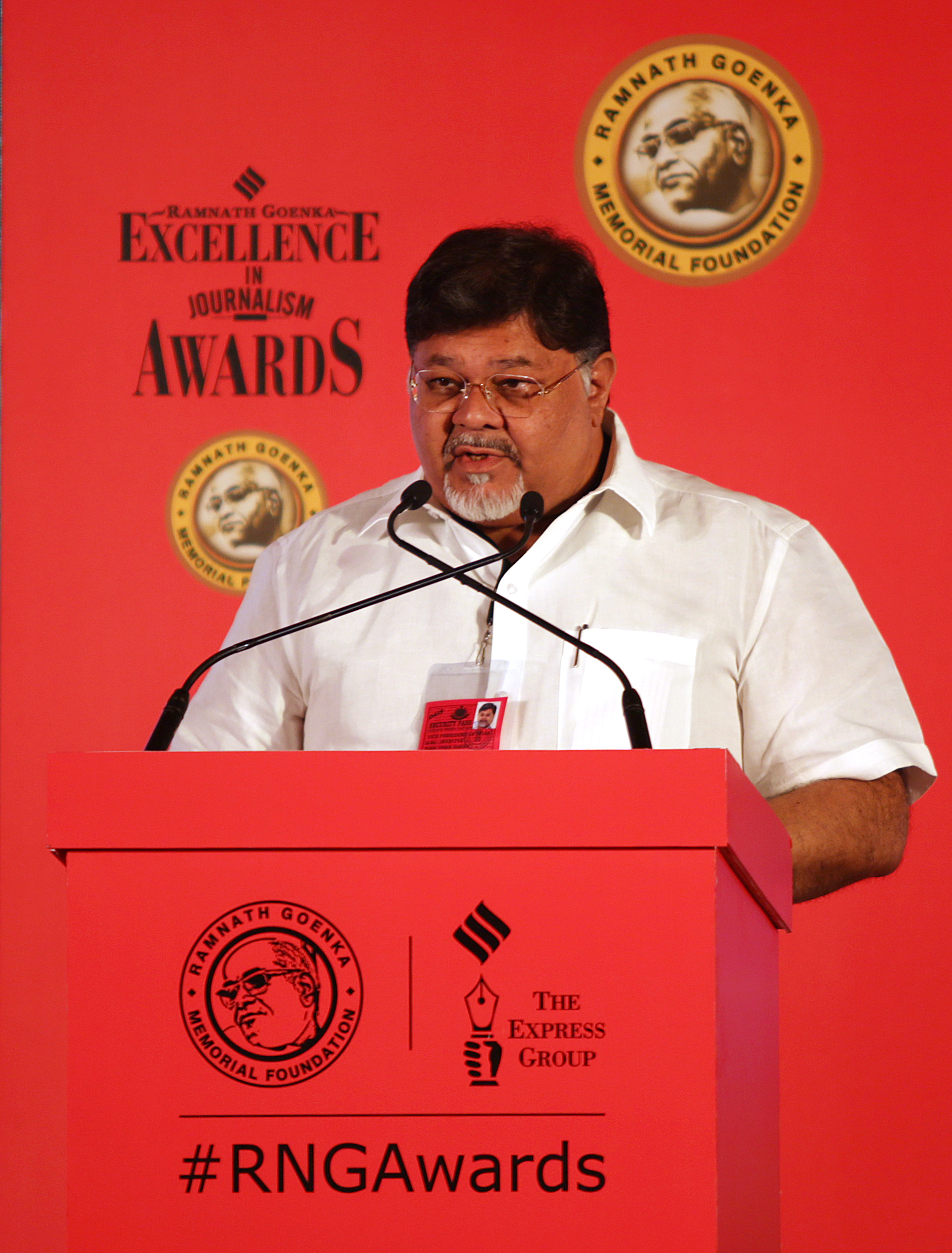
- Viveck Goenka at the Ramnath Goenka Awards
- Born: 3 December 1957 (age 68)
- Occupations: Chairman, Managing Director, and Editorial Director of the Indian Express Group

Viveck Goenka is the Chairman, Managing Director and Editorial Director of the Indian Express Group. The newspapers included in the Indian Express Group include the flagship newspaper, The Indian Express, business and economy daily Financial Express; Marathi daily; Loksatta and Jansatta in Hindi. Online, the group is today the third largest news group in the country.

== Early life and education ==
Viveck Goenka was born in Chennai – then Madras, to Krishna Khaitan and Ajay Mohan Khaitan. Ramnath Goenka, his maternal grandfather, was the founder of the Indian Express Group. In 1991, Ramnath Goenka formally adopted him as his son and heir. He self identifies himself as Tamilian.

Viveck Goenka completed his B Tech, Chemical Engineering from Madras University in 1979. In 1985, he moved to Mumbai and joined the Indian Express Group.

== Career ==
=== Publishing, Press and Media ===
Viveck Goenka has led the Indian Express Group for nearly three decades. The newspaper has to its credit, significant newsbreaks in journalism which have effected change in public policy and legislation in contemporary India.

Goenka pioneered the first organized B2B segment in trade publishing India. Today, this showcases a range of publications: Express Computer, Express Pharma, Express Healthcare and Express Travelworld.

Goenka is credited with starting Bollywood's first jury based awards - the Screen Awards.

He is currently the Chairman of The Press Trust of India Limited (PTI) and has served as Chairman of the United News of India. He has been a Council Member of the National Readership Studies Council (NRSC) and on the board of Governors of the Media Research Users Council (MRUC), two organizations providing research data on media in India. He has also been a Council member of the Audit Bureau of Circulation (ABC), and was one of the past presidents of the Indian Newspaper Society (INS). He is a member of the Advertising Association, India Chapter and was a member of the International Advertising Association Inc., New York.

== Ramnath Goenka Journalism Awards ==
To help acknowledge and build excellence in journalism beyond the Express Group, Goenka launched the Ramnath Goenka Excellence in Journalism Awards. The awards cover a range of categories - from politics and investigation to sport and civic reporting.

== Social Service ==
The Ramnath Goenka Memorial Trust which is headed by Goenka is active in the fields of wildlife and water conservation. It helps to support education in Adivasi areas of Madhya Pradesh, and education and medical needs of underprivileged children in urban areas.

== Other interests ==
=== Sports ===
Goenka became Secretary of Tamil Nadu Badminton Association at the age of twenty one. He was the first person to start a prize money, ranking and selection tournament in 1991 for juniors and sub-juniors. This tournament, which Goenka named after his late mother Krishna Khaitan, has become the premier badminton tournament in the country.

=== Cars ===
Goenka has a collection of 4x4s, vintage and classic cars. He restores cars and those restored cars have also won prizes in competitions including in all 5 editions of the prestigious Cartier Concours de Elegance vintage car shows that have been held in India.

=== Restaurateur ===
He and his daughter have founded The Sassy Spoon chain of restaurants. The Sassy Teaspoon patisseries are noted for their desserts and pastries. The Barazza Bar in Pune and The House of Mandarin in Bandra (Mumbai) fall under Goenka's ownership as well.

== Family and personal life ==
Viveck Goenka is married to Zita Goenka and they have two daughters – Rachel and Sasha. He has a son – Anant, from a previous marriage. His first wife Ananya lives with his Son Anant.
