= Screen Awards =

Former Indian awards ceremony

- Awarded for: Excellence in Indian cinema
- Date: 5 April 2026
- Country: India
- Presented by: Indian Express Group
- First award: 1995; 31 years ago
- Website: indianexpress.com/screen-awards

Television/radio coverage
- Network: 2000–2011: StarPlus; 2012–2013: Colors; 2014–2015: Life OK; 2016–2019: StarPlus; 2026: Sony Entertainment Television, SonyLIV, YouTube

The Screen Awards are Indian film awards instituted by the Indian Express Group in 1994, with the first ceremony being held in 1995. The awards recognise achievements in Indian cinema across categories covering films, performances, direction, music, and technical contributions to filmmaking. Nominees and winners are selected through by Screen Academy, which includes professionals from the film industry as its members.

After a hiatus starting in 2019, the event returned in April 2026 as the Chetak Screen Awards.

== History ==
=== Establishment and early years ===
The Screen Awards were initiated in 1994 by Viveck Goenka, chairman of the Indian Express Group, to recognise achievements in Indian cinema. The first ceremony was held in 1995. The awards followed a jury-based selection process, with winners chosen by professionals from the film industry.

Until 2001, the awards were sponsored by Videocon International and known as the Screen Videocon Awards. The event was held in three regional editions, recognising achievements in South Indian cinema, covering Tamil, Telugu, Malayalam, and Kannada films.

=== Star India period ===
In March 2015, Star India acquired the Screen brand franchise from the Indian Express Group. The acquisition included the Screen Awards property, archival material, and employees associated with Screen magazine. The awards were integrated into Star India's entertainment business. During this period, the awards were associated with different television broadcast partners. The Star Screen Awards were telecast on StarPlus, followed by editions broadcast on Colors and Life OK. The event later returned to StarPlus.

The last ceremony before the subsequent hiatus was held on 8 December 2019 in Mumbai as the Star Screen Awards.

=== Return to Indian Express Group ===
In October 2024, the Indian Express Group relaunched Screen as a digital publication.

In August 2025, the Indian Express Group announced the return of the Screen Awards through a strategic partnership with YouTube. For the 2026 edition, the revived awards introduced a digital-first format and a selection process involving the Screen Academy, an independent body comprising filmmakers, artists, and other professionals from the entertainment industry.

The ceremony returned on 5 April 2026 as the Chetak Screen Awards and recognised achievements in Indian theatrical and OTT films released in 2025. It was broadcast on Sony Entertainment Television and made available on SonyLIV and YouTube. The awards were presented across 31 categories.

== Awards ==
=== Jury awards ===
- Best Film
- Best Director
- Best Actor
- Best Actress
- Best Supporting Actor
- Best Supporting Actress
- Best Villain
- Best Comedian
- Best Music Director
- Best Lyricist
- Best Male Playback
- Best Female Playback
- Most Promising Newcomer – Male
- Most Promising Newcomer – Female

=== Critics' awards ===
- Best Actor (Critics)
- Best Actress (Critics)

=== Technical awards ===
- Best Story
- Best Screenplay
- Best Dialogue
- Best Background Music
- Best Editing
- Special Effects
- Best Art Direction
- Best Action
- Best Cinematography
- Best Choreography
- Best Sound Design

=== Special awards ===
- Lifetime Achievement
- Jodi No. 1
- Best Child Artist
- Special Jury Award
- Best Fresh Talent
- Best Jodi of the Decade
- Showman of the Millennium – Raj Kapoor (2002)
- Best Performer of The Year – Ekta Kapoor (2012)
- Legend of Indian Cinema Award – Amitabh Bachchan (2013)

=== Retired awards ===
- Best Actor (Popular Choice)
- Best Actress (Popular Choice)
- Entertainer of the Year (2010–12,13,19)
- Best Animation Film (2009)
- Best Film in English (2009)

== Records and facts ==
Most awards to a single film

- Dangal – 12
- Gully Boy – 12
- Devdas – 11

Most directing awards

- Sanjay Leela Bhansali – 3
- Ashutosh Gowariker – 2
- Rakesh Roshan – 2

Most acting awards – male (Best Actor + Best Supporting Actor), in chronological order

- Amitabh Bachchan (4 + 0) = 4
- Shahrukh Khan (4+0) = 4
- Hrithik Roshan (4 + 0) = 4
- Anil Kapoor (1 + 2) = 3
- Saif Ali Khan (0 + 3) = 3

Most acting awards – female (Best Actress + Best Supporting Actress), in chronological order

- Vidya Balan (5 + 0) = 5
- Madhuri Dixit (3 + 1) = 4

Most awards for music direction

- A.R. Rahman – 5
- Pritam – 4
- Shankar–Ehsaan–Loy – 3

Most lyricist awards

- Javed Akhtar – 5
- Gulzar – 4
- Anand Bakshi – 3
- Prasoon Joshi – 3

Most playback singer awards – male

- Arijit Singh – 4
- Sonu Nigam – 3
- Sukhwinder Singh – 2
- Rahat Fateh Ali Khan – 2

Most playback singer awards – female

- Shreya Ghoshal – 7
- K.S.Chithra (includes for South Indian languages) – 3
- Kavita Krishnamurthy – 2
- Alka Yagnik – 2
- Sunidhi Chauhan – 2

Youngest Best Actress winner

- Alia Bhatt for Udta Punjab – aged 23

Youngest Best Actor winner

- Hrithik Roshan for Kaho Naa... Pyaar Hai – aged 27

== See also ==
- Hindi cinema
- Cinema of India
