= Pratiyogita Darpan =

Indian bilingual magazine

- Founder: Shri Mahendra Jain
- Founded: 1978
- Headquarters: Agra, India

Pratiyogita Darpan (Hindi: प्रतियोगिता दर्पण) is an Indian bi-lingual magazine. It focuses on current affairs and general knowledge, and is specially useful for civil service exams and similar competitive exams.

== History and profile ==
Pratiyogita Darpan was established by Shri Mahendra Jain, in 1978. Published by Upkar Prakashan based in Agra, it is a widely read and popular magazine for exams and covers wide areas from current affairs, economy, geography, history, politics and constitution of India. The magazine also has an online version, and is published in English and Hindi languages.

According to Indian Readership Survey (IRS), with an average issue readership (AIR) of 2.154 million, in 2011 Q2, it topped the list of career/ education magazines in India it also had a total readership of 5 million, and was the 3rd largest magazine in India.
