= Divya Bhaskar =

Indian newspaper

- Type: Daily newspaper
- Format: Broadsheet
- Owner: D B Corp Ltd.
- Founded: 2003
- Language: Gujarati
- Headquarters: Ahmedabad, Gujarat, India
- Circulation: 511,871 Daily
- Website: www.divyabhaskar.co.in

Divya Bhaskar (transl. the divine Sun) is a Gujarati newspaper in Gujarat, India, owned by D B Corp Ltd. It is one of the highest circulation Gujarati dailies. With the most local editions in Gujarat, it is published from Ahmedabad, Surat, Vadodara, Rajkot, Jamnagar, Mehsana, Bhuj, Bhavnagar (as Saurashtra Samachar) and Junagadh (as Sorath Bhaskar).

== History ==
In 2003, the Bhopal-based Bhaskar Group identified Ahmedabad, Gujarat as the city with highest potential for the fourth launch of Dainik Bhaskar outside Madhya Pradesh (MP). It surveyed 12 lakh (1,200,000) households, with a team of 1050 surveyors, 64 supervisors, 16 zonal managers and 4 divisional managers. The surveyors were gathered largely through posters at colleges and word-of-mouth publicity, instead of expensive print and TV advertisements. Nearly 40-50% of the surveyors were later absorbed in Dainik Bhaskar or Divya Bhaskar, while the rest were given a certificate of appreciation. The team was trained to reach out to 8 lakh (800,000) households in Ahmedabad and 4 lakh (400,000) households in adjoining districts, in a time span of 40 days. The newspaper was launched in Ahmedabad on 23 June 2003, under the name Divya Bhaskar, as No. 1 with 452,000 copies (a world record). Within 15 months, it entered two more cities of Gujarat: Surat and Vadodara. To counter the Bhaskar's group's threat, the leading Gujarati newspapers came up with color pages, price reductions and several high-value customer offers. However, by 2009, Divya Bhaskar became the largest circulated Gujarati daily with 11.5 lakh (1,150,000) copies.

The group's pre-launch door-to-door twin-contact launch program has been recognized as an orbit shifting innovation. It has won Business Process Innovation award by Marico Foundation, and is a case study in several B-schools including Indian Institute of Management, Ahmedabad and SPJIMR. The case study reveals, Divya Bhaskar become most popular among all other Gujarati news papers because of its erotic news and relationship related column.

Following its launch, Divya Bhaskar has become the largest circulated daily of Gujarat according to the Audit Bureau of Circulations (India) and has the most local editions by any newspaper in Gujarat.
