= Dainik Bhaskar =

Indian Hindi-language daily newspaper

- Type: Daily newspaper
- Format: Broadsheet
- Owner: D B Corp Ltd.
- Founded: 1948; 78 years ago (as Subah Savere in Bhopal and Good Morning India in Gwalior); 1957; 69 years ago (as Bhaskar Samachar); 1958; 68 years ago (as Dainik Bhaskar)
- Political alignment: Centre-left
- Language: Hindi
- Headquarters: Bhopal, Madhya Pradesh, India
- Country: India
- Circulation: 3,566,617 Daily (as of April 2023)
- Sister newspapers: Divya Bhaskar; Dainik Divya Marathi
- Website: bhaskar.com

Dainik Bhaskar (lit. 'The Daily Sun') is a Hindi-language daily newspaper in India which is owned by the Dainik Bhaskar Group. According to the World Association of Newspapers, it ranked fourth in the world by circulation in 2016 and per the Indian Audit Bureau of Circulations was the largest newspaper in India by circulation as of 2022. Started in Bhopal in 1958 by Ramesh Chandra Agarwal, it expanded in 1983 with the launch of Dainik Bhaskar's Indore edition. The Dainik Bhaskar Group is present in 13 Indian states with 65 editions in Hindi, Marathi, and Gujarati.

== History ==
Subah Savere was launched in 1948 to fulfill the need for a Hindi-language daily newspaper. It launched under the name Subah Savere ("Early Morning") in Bhopal and Good Morning India in Gwalior. In 1957, the newspaper was renamed Bhaskar Samachar.

In 1958, the newspaper was renamed Dainik Bhaskar. The word Bhaskar means "the Rising Sun" in English. Its rising sun graphic was meant to represent a bright future.

=== 2021 income tax raids ===
On 22 July 2021, Income Tax Department conducted tax raids at 30 locations of Dainik Bhaskar Group in Delhi, Madhya Pradesh, Rajasthan, Gujarat and Maharashtra on charges of alleged tax evasion The homes of some of the employees were also raided. In a statement, Dainik Bhaskar claimed that the raids had been conducted after the newspaper exposed mismanagement of COVID by the government and published the real COVID-19 death statistics. They also alleged that mobile phones of the employees were seized and employees were barred from leaving.

Congress leader Jairam Ramesh said the media house was "paying the price" for its coverage during the pandemic. "Through its reporting Dainik Bhaskar has exposed the Modi regime's monumental mismanagement of the COVID-19 pandemic. It is now paying the price. An Undeclared Emergency as Arun Shourie has said — this is a Modified Emergency," he tweeted. Several other leaders including Rajasthan chief minister Ashok Gehlot, Delhi chief minister Arvind Kejriwal, West Bengal chief minister Mamata Banerjee also condemned the incident and expressed the common viewpoint of the raids being a "mode of intimidation". The Editors Guild of India also expressed concern about the income tax raids on Dainik Bhaskar. Union Minister and BJP MP Anurag Thakur has denied any government interference and claimed agencies are doing their job. At last, it was claimed that tax evasion of 7,000,000,000 INR has taken place over the period of six years.

=== High Court order directing corrigendum ===
In March 2023, Dainik Bhaskar posted a video on its Twitter handle stating Bihari migrant workers were attacked by people in Tamil Nadu for speaking Hindi. Four months later, Madras High Court called the reporting "fake news" and directed Dainik Bhaskar to issue apology to the court and to the "people of Tamil Nadu" by issuing a corrigendum on front page of its print editions. During the investigation, Tamil Nadu police also released CCTV footage to prove the incident was a suicide, not a murder.

=== Fake and misleading news ===
In May 2022, Dainik Bhaskar published a report claiming that slogans of "Pakistan Zindabad" were raised in Bhilwara, Rajasthan. However, a fact-check by Alt News later revealed that the claim was false. The actual slogan raised was "SDPI Zindabad," not "Pakistan Zindabad."

On 23 August 2018, Dainik Bhaskar published an article featuring a photo of a baby elephant with the caption: "The army is helping not just people but also animals trapped in the Kerala floods. A soldier rescued this baby elephant." The caption suggested that the image was from the Kerala floods and showed the army rescuing the elephant. However, a fact-check by Alt News revealed that the photo was actually eight months old and had nothing to do with Kerala, it was taken in Tamil Nadu.

On September 12, 2026, The Hindu and Dainik Bhaskar published full-page advertisements titled "What is Dera Sacha Sauda? (Facts vs Fiction)", defending spiritual leader and convict Gurmeet Ram Rahim Singh, and further portraying him as a social reformer. The advertisements, claimed that Singh had been targeted through false cases and witnesses and defended his repeated paroles and furloughs as being within legal provisions. Although both newspapers included disclaimers stating that they had no editorial or journalistic involvement in the advertisements, they were met with backlash for their decision to publish the piece.

== Expansion ==
By 1995, Dainik Bhaskar had emerged as the number 1 newspaper in Madhya Pradesh (MP) and was declared the fastest-growing daily in India by a readership survey. The newspaper decided to expand outside MP and identified Jaipur, the capital city of Rajasthan, as the market with the highest potential.

In 1996, Dainik Bhaskar's goal was to enter Jaipur as the No. 2 newspaper (in terms of circulation) on its first day, with 50,000 copies. To achieve this target, an in-house team of 700 surveyors surveyed 200,000 potential newspaper households in Jaipur. Based on survey feedback, they went back to each of the households surveyed to show them a prototype of the newspaper and gave them the option of an advance subscription. The customers were offered a subscription price of ₹1.50 (a discount compared to the newsstand price of ₹2), and a refund in case of dissatisfaction. When Dainik Bhaskar launched in Jaipur on 19 December 1996, it was the No. 1 newspaper by selling 172,347 copies. Amar Ujala, is a Hindi-dialect day by day daily paper distributed in India. It has 19 versions in seven states and one union domain covering 167 regions. It has a course of around two million copies. Rajasthan Patrika, the former leader had a circulation of around 100,000 copies at that time. Dainik Bhaskar successfully adopted a similar model in other cities of Rajasthan, including Jodhpur, Bikaner, Kota, Udaipur, and Ajmer Sikar, becoming the No.1 urban newspaper of the entire state by 1999.

The next target was Chandigarh. It launched a customer survey in January 2000, covering 220,000 households. At that time, the English language newspapers in Chandigarh outsold the Hindi newspapers sixfold, with The Tribune as the leader with a circulation of approximately 50,000 copies. Dainik Bhaskar's survey suggested that residents of Chandigarh preferred English newspapers due to quality perceptions. As a result, the newspaper incorporated the local Chandigarh dialect in the design, mixing Hindi and English. Dainik Bhaskar launched in Chandigarh in May 2000 with 69,000 copies sold making it No.1 in the city.

In June 2000, Dainik Bhaskar entered Haryana, with 271,000 copies.

In 2006, Dainik Bhaskar launched in Punjab with the Amritsar and Jalandhar editions and became the No.1 newspaper on the first day, displacing established legacy players. Later, it increased its presence in Punjab in Ludhiana and Bhatinda.

In 2010, Dainik Bhaskar entered the Jharkhand market with the launch of a Ranchi edition, followed by Jamshedpur and Dhanbad editions.

In January 2014, Dainik Bhaskar entered Bihar with a successful launch in Patna It followed with launch of Muzaffarpur, Bhagalpur and Gaya editions in 2015.

In April 2014, Dainik Bhaskar launched an online Hindi edition in Uttar Pradesh.

In June 2017, Dainik Bhaskar launched its Hindi News on three different platforms: Android, iOS and Windows.

== Editions ==
Dainik Bhaskar has five editions in Madhya Pradesh, one edition in Uttar Pradesh, four editions in Chhattisgarh, 12 editions in Rajasthan, three editions in Haryana, four editions in Punjab, four editions in Bihar, three editions Jharkhand and one edition each in Chandigarh, Himachal Pradesh, Uttarakhand, Jammu and Kashmir.
