= Mid-Day =

Morning daily Indian compact newspaper

mid-day

- Type: Daily newspaper
- Format: Compact
- Owner: Mid Day Infomedia Limited
- Founder(s): Abdul Hamid Ansari (Inquilab, 1937) Khalid A. H. Ansari (mid-day, 1979)
- Publisher: Mid-Day Infomedia,
- Editor: Clayton Murzello
- Photo editor: -
- Founded: 1979
- Political alignment: Liberal
- Language: English, Gujarati (as Gujaratimidday.com and Urdu (as The Inquilab)
- Headquarters: Mumbai, India
- Sister newspapers: Inquilab, Gujarati Midday
- Website: www.mid-day.com
- Free online archives: epaper.mid-day.com

Mid-Day (stylised as mid-day) is a morning daily Indian compact newspaper. Editions in various languages including Gujarati and English have been published out of Mumbai, Delhi, Bangalore and Pune. In 2011, the Delhi and Bangalore editions were closed down. In 2014, Jagran Prakashan shut down the midday Pune edition as well.

== Establishment ==
The paper was established in Mumbai by journalist Khalid Ansari in 1979 as a family-owned newspaper. The Sunday edition of the paper began in 1981. Later, his son, Tariq Ansari led the paper, who sold its ownership to Jagran Prakashan in 2010.

The newspaper underwent an overhaul, both, of its print editions and its website in early 2014, creating several new sections in the daily newspaper, in its Sunday edition and on its website.

It founded Radio One (India), a radio station initially operating as Radio Midday in Mumbai, which was eventually acquired by HT Media as 94.3 Radio One in 2019.

== Relaunch of the newspaper and website in 2014 ==
Originally, the newspaper published two editions in Mumbai: an early-morning and a noon edition. Since April 2009, only the morning editions have been published and the company has dropped printing a noon newspaper, citing positioning issues. During the overhaul and relaunch of the newspaper and the website in 2014, the paper's slogan was also changed to Made in Mumbai. As of 2014, the paper had an estimated readership base of 5,00,000 for MiD Day (English) in Mumbai and was featured in the list of top 10 Indian newspapers by readership in the 2013 Indian Readership Survey list. The new look Mid-Day has received both positive and negative reactions.

In October 2019, the Sunday Mid-Day was relaunched with a new look.

== Journalists jailed for reports on chief justice ==
On 20 September 2007, four journalists of Mid Day, including Resident Editor Vitusha Oberoi and City Editor MK Tayal, were sentenced to four months jail on contempt of court charges, because of a report they had filed on the ex-Chief Justice of India, Y. K. Sabharwal.

Many in the legal community feel that in the 2006 Delhi sealing drive, Justice Sabharwal may have had a conflict of interest since his sons own a firm with relations to the Delhi real estate. Former Solicitor General KK Sud had called this behaviour "the height of indiscretion."

The High Court, however, sentenced the journalists without considering the veracity of the reports, and this led to considerable controversy. Ex-law minister Shanti Bhushan stated that the Parliament had in 2006 amended the Contempt of Courts Act to say that "if the allegations against a judge were found to be true, then they would not be considered contemptuous." In view of this, the judgment, he said, may be "only aimed at terrifying the media and an attempt to curb truthfulness."

== Awards and other achievements ==
- Mid-day made it to the top 10 English dailies at the IRS 2019 Q1
- Asia Multimedia Publishing Media Awards 2009
- INMA AWARDS 2008 at California – USA INMA AWARDS
- Amsterdam IFRA AWARDS 2008

== Senior staff ==
Jyotirmoy Dey, the Special Investigations Editor of Mid-Day was shot dead on 11 June 2011 in Mumbai by unknown assailants.

== Midday International Icon Awards ==
In 2021, Midday started the International Icon Award to felicitate various achievers in a different field.

== See also ==
- List of newspapers in India
