= The Indian Express =

Daily broadsheet newspaper in India

- Journalism of Courage

- The publication's 4 August 2009 front page
- Type: Daily newspaper
- Format: Broadsheet
- Owner: Indian Express Limited
- Publisher: Indian Express Limited
- Editor-in-chief: Raj Kamal Jha
- Founded: 1932; 94 years ago
- Language: English
- Headquarters: B1/B, Express Building, Sector 10, Noida, Uttar Pradesh, India
- Circulation: 1,600,000 daily (as of 2017)
- Price: ₹6 (6.2¢ US)
- Sister newspapers: The Financial Express; Loksatta; Jansatta
- OCLC number: 70274541
- Website: indianexpress.com

The Indian Express is an English-language Indian daily newspaper founded in 1932 by P. Varadarajulu Naidu. It is headquartered in Noida, owned by the Indian Express Limited (formerly Indian Express Group). It was later taken over by Ramnath Goenka. In 1999, eight years after Goenka's death in 1991, the group was split between the family members. The southern editions took the name The New Indian Express, while the northern editions, based in Mumbai, retained the original Indian Express name with The prefixed to the title.

== History ==
In 1932, the Indian Express was started by an Ayurvedic doctor, P. Varadarajulu Naidu, at Madras ( Chennai), being published by his Tamil Nadu press. Soon under financial difficulties, he sold the newspaper to Swaminathan Sadanand, the founder of The Free Press Journal, a national news agency. In 1933, the Indian Express opened its second office in Madurai, launching the Tamil edition, Dinamani. Sadanand introduced several innovations and reduced the price of the newspaper. Faced with financial difficulties, he sold a part of his stake to Goenka as convertible debentures. In 1935, when The Free Press Journal finally collapsed, and after a protracted court battle with Goenka, Sadanand lost ownership of Indian Express. In 1939, Goenka bought Andhra Prabha, another prominent Telugu daily newspaper. The name Three Musketeers was often used for the three dailies, namely Indian Express, Dinamani and Andhra Prabha.

In 1940, the whole premises was gutted by fire. The Hindu, a rival newspaper, helped considerably in re-launching the paper, by lending their old building and letting it be printed temporarily at one of its Swadesimithran's press and later offered its recently vacated premises at 2 Mount Road, on rent to Goenka, which later became the landmark Express Estates. This relocation also helped the Express obtain better high speed printing machines. The district judge who led the inquiry into the fire concluded that a short circuit or cigarette butt could have ignited the fire and said that the growing city had inadequate fire control support. In 1952, the paper had a circulation of 44,469.

After Goenka's death in 1991, two of his grandsons, Manoj Kumar Sonthalia and Viveck Goenka split the group into two. Indian Express Mumbai with all the North Indian editions went to Viveck Goenka, and all the Southern editions, which were grouped as Express Publications Madurai Limited and headquartered in Chennai, went to Sonthalia. Indian Express began publishing daily on the internet on 8 July 1996. Five months later, the website expressindia.com attracted "700,000 hits every day, excepting weekends when it fell to 60% of its normal levels".

== Circulation ==
According to the Indian Readership Survey (IRS) 2017, the Indian Express is the sixth most read English newspaper with a readership of nearly 1.6 million readers.

Circulation in major cities
| City | Approximate daily circulation |
|---|---|
| Mumbai | 160,000 |
| Delhi | 140,000 |
| Pune | 90,000 |
| Chandigarh | 45,000 |
| Ahmedabad | 42,000 |
| Nagpur | 40,000 |
| Lucknow | 40,000 |

== Controversies ==
In 25th January 2020, Indian Express ran a Fake TRP scam case against Republic TV and others, Mumbai court directed to withdraw the FIR as Fake TRP Scam ran by Indian Express was found to be fake news. Republic TV sends legal notice to Indian Express over running a Fake Story on Fake TRP Scam.

In May 2020, the Indian Express reported that the Crime Branch of the Delhi Police had determined that an audio clip shared on WhatsApp, which was presented as a recording of Saad Kandhlawi asking Tablighi Jamaat members to disregard social distancing recommendations for a religious congregation during the COVID-19 pandemic, had been "doctored". The Bureau of Police Research and Development subsequently listed the audio clip as an example of "fake news and disinformation vectors" in a report and retracted it one day later. In response, the Delhi Police posted on Twitter that the Indian Express article was incorrect and summoned the reporter for questioning. The Indian Express replied on Twitter that they had contacted Special Commissioner of Police Praveer Ranjan for comment and that Ranjan did not respond before the article's publication.

In 2022, Indian Express published a piece in its newspaper claiming that the director generals of few Indian paramilitary forces were not invited to the Republic Day parade. The concerned forces later clarified that the news was incorrect and the director generals had attended the event.

In February 2025, Shashi Tharoor accused Indian Express of manipulation of his speech. Indian Express swiftly reported in English that Tharoor said during the podcast that he has "other options" if his party no longer needs him. He accused the newspaper of running a "fake news story claiming I had decried the absence of a leader" in the Kerala Congress.

== See also ==
- Ramnath Goenka Excellence in Journalism Awards
- Screen Awards
