= Shaala Darpan =

ICT Programme of the Government of India

Shala Darpan is an ICT Programme of Ministry of Human Resource Development, Government of India that aims to provide mobile access to parents of students of Government and Government aided schools. This information can only be obtained about the students of government schools. The implementation of Shala Darpan Portal is with the Rajasthan Government Education Department.

== Facilities available on Rajasthan Shala Darpan portal ==
1. School search process
2. Process to view school report
3. Procedure for viewing student's report
4. Procedure for viewing staff report
5. Scheme Search Process
6. Know Your School NICSD ID
7. Process to know the staff details
8. Staff login
9. Transfer schedule
