= Ramesh Chandra Agarwal =

Indian media proprietor (1944-2017)

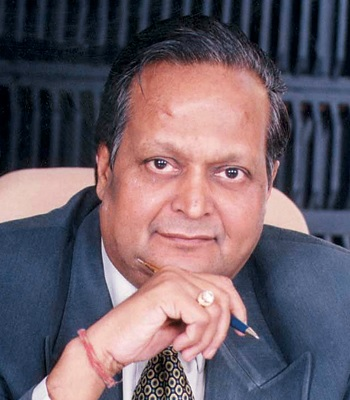
- Born: 30 November 1944; Jhansi, United Provinces, British India
- Died: 12 April 2017 (aged 72); Ahmedabad, Gujarat, India
- Occupation: Chairman of D B Corp Ltd.
- Children: 4

Ramesh Chandra Agarwal (30 November 1944 – 12 April 2017) was an Indian media proprietor and founder-chairman of the Dainik Bhaskar group of newspapers that has a presence in 14 states of India with 62 editions and has an estimated readership of over 15 million. He started Dainik Bhaskar newspaper at Bhopal in 1958. In 1983 he launched the Indore edition and in 1996 it was produced in Rajasthan. He was on the board of D.B. Corp Limited from its inception.

== Career ==
Agarwal was engaged in the running of the Dainik Bhaskar organization for over four decades. He turned an ailing family-owned newspaper business into the fourth-largest circulated daily in the world, being present in 13 states in India with 66 editions. Dainik Bhaskar paved the way in replacing the pure, undistilled Hindi of the discerning litterateur with popular, colloquial words that easily connected with the masses.

Daily News and Analysis (DNA), with Subhash Chandra of the Essel Group, was his first step into English-language publications and DB Post was his second.

He was also the Chairman of the Federation of Indian Chambers of Commerce and Industry – Madhya Pradesh. He had been awarded the Rajiv Gandhi Lifetime Achievement Award in Journalism. He was awarded within 50 most powerful Business houses by India Today Magazine in 2003, 2006 and 2007

He was ranked 95 on the Forbes list of India's Richest in 2012.

He has three sons actively involved in his business, and also a daughter.

== Death ==
Agarwal died at Ahmedabad Airport after a cardiac arrest on 12 April 2017. He was cremated on the next day at Bhadbhada Shmashana, in Bhopal.

== Biography ==
The story of his life and the rise of Dainik Bhaskar Group has been documented in the book titled 'Ramesh Chandra Agarwal: The man who created the Dainik Bhaskar Group' written by Bharathi S Pradhan and published by Amaryllis, the English imprint of Manjul Publishing House, in December 2019.
