= Loksatta =

Marathi newspaper

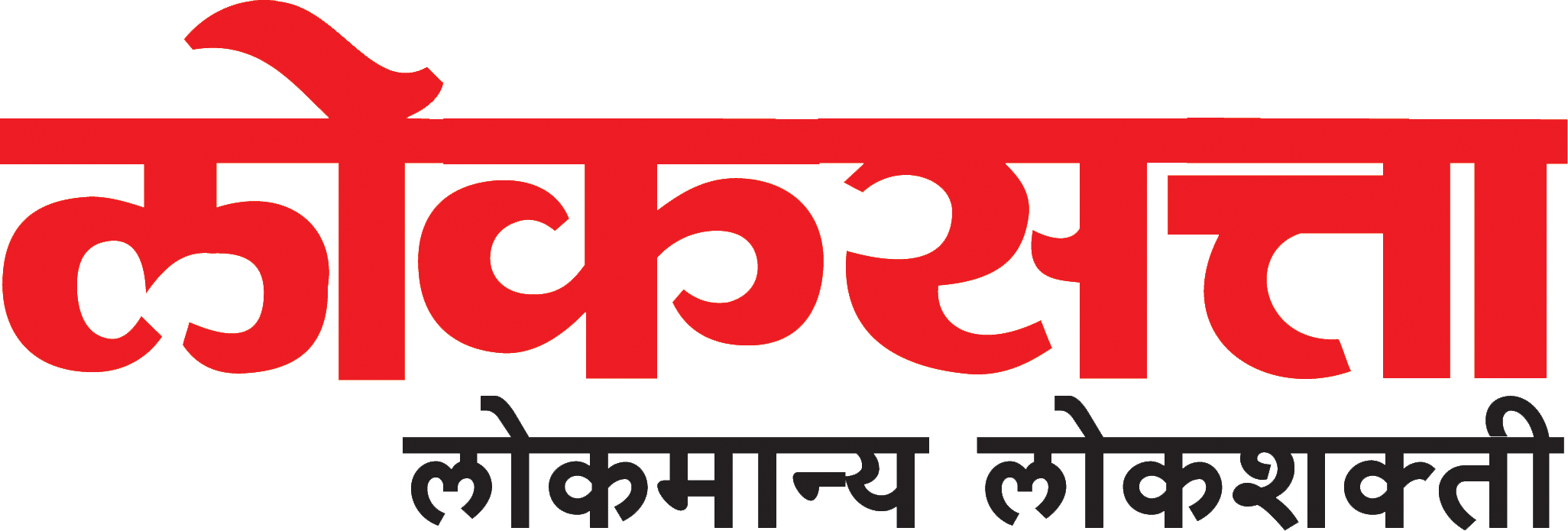

- Sunday edition
- Type: Daily
- Format: Broadsheet
- Owner: Indian Express Group
- Founder: Ramnath Goenka
- Editor: Girish Kuber
- Founded: 14 January 1948
- Language: Marathi
- Headquarters: Mumbai
- Sister newspapers: Lokrang, Ravivar Vruttant (Sunday), Chaturang, Vasturang (Saturday), Viva (Friday), Local Supplement (Tuesday–Saturday)
- Website: www.loksatta.com
- Free online archives: epaper.loksatta.com

Loksatta is an Indian newspaper. It was established on 14 January 1948. Loksatta gained notability through its coverage of Mahatma Gandhi's assassination and subsequent developments; the founder of the Indian Express Group, Ramnath Goenka, remained dedicated to Loksatta.

After remaining the largest circulated standard Marathi daily for many years, by the late-90s Loksatta saw competition from newer daily newspapers like Maharashtra Times. By 1997, it only circulated around 400,000 daily papers in Mumbai, Pune, Ahmednagar and Nagpur combined.

However, circulation increased in the 2000s after changes which included addition of various supplements and adding several new city editions for local news.

== Editors ==
- T.V. Parvate
- H.R. Mahajani
- R. N. Late
- Vidyadhar Gokhale
- Madhav Yeshwant Gadkari
- Arun Tikekar
- Kumar Ketkar
- Girish Kuber

== News Editors ==
- Hari Apte
- Tukaram Kokje
- Aatmaram Shetye
- Ramesh Zawar
- Vishwanath More
- Datta Panchwagh
- Prashant Dixit
