= DB Corp =

Indian newspaper group

D B Corp Ltd.
- Type: Public
- Traded as: NSE: DBCORP; BSE: 533151
- Industry: Media
- Founded: 1958; 68 years ago
- Founders: Ramesh Chandra Agarwal
- Headquarters: Bhopal, Madhya Pradesh, India
- Key people: Sudhir Agarwal (MD)
- Products: Publishing; radio; web portals
- Revenue: ₹2,236 crore (US$230 million) (2020)
- Operating income: ₹373 crore (US$39 million) (2020)
- Net income: ₹274 crore (US$28 million) (2020)
- Number of employees: 9,120 (2020)
- Website: www.dainikbhaskargroup.com

D B Corp Ltd., also known as the Dainik Bhaskar Group, is an Indian newspaper group, with 66 editions, published in four languages. The major newspapers published by the group, are Dainik Bhaskar (Hindi daily), Divya Bhaskar (Gujarati daily), Dainik Divya Marathi (Marathi daily), Saurashtra Samachar, DB Post (English daily), and DB Star.

The Group also publishes three magazines; Aha! Zindagi (a monthly family magazine in Hindi), Bal Bhaskar (a Hindi magazine for kids) and Young Bhaskar (an English magazine for kids).

Listed on the Bombay Stock Exchange, the group is majority-owned by the Bhopal-based Agarwal family.

== Newspapers ==
The Dainik Bhaskar Group's publications serve a variety of Indian states:

- Dainik Bhaskar, the Group's flagship Hindi daily, serves 11 states, offering 45 editions.
- Divya Bhaskar, a Gujarati daily, serves 2 states with 8 editions.
- Dainik Divya Marathi, a Marathi daily, serves the state of Maharashtra, offering 6 editions.
- DB Star serves 3 states with 5 editions.
- Saurashtra Samachar serves 1 state with 1 edition.
- DB Post serves 1 state with 1 edition.

Dainik Bhaskar was declared the world's fourth largest circulated daily in 2016–2017.
