= The Financial Express (India) =

Indian English-language business newspaper

- Front page dated 28 March 2009
- Type: Daily newspaper
- Format: Broadsheet
- Owner: Indian Express Group
- Editor: Shyamal Majumdar
- Founded: 1961; 65 years ago
- Political alignment: Unknown
- Language: English
- Headquarters: B/B1, Express Building, Sector 10, Noida 201301, Uttar Pradesh, India
- OCLC number: 30000665
- Website: www.financialexpress.com

The Financial Express is an Indian English-language business newspaper owned by The Indian Express Group. It has been published by the Indian Express group since 1961. The Financial Express specialises in Indian and international business and financial news. Its editor is Shyamal Majumdar.

Previous logo

The paper publishes 11 editions from a number of Indian cities. It also gives out two noteworthy awards - FE India's Best Bank Awards and FE-EVI Green Business Leadership Awards.
