= Ramnath Goenka =

Indian newspaper publisher (1904–1991)

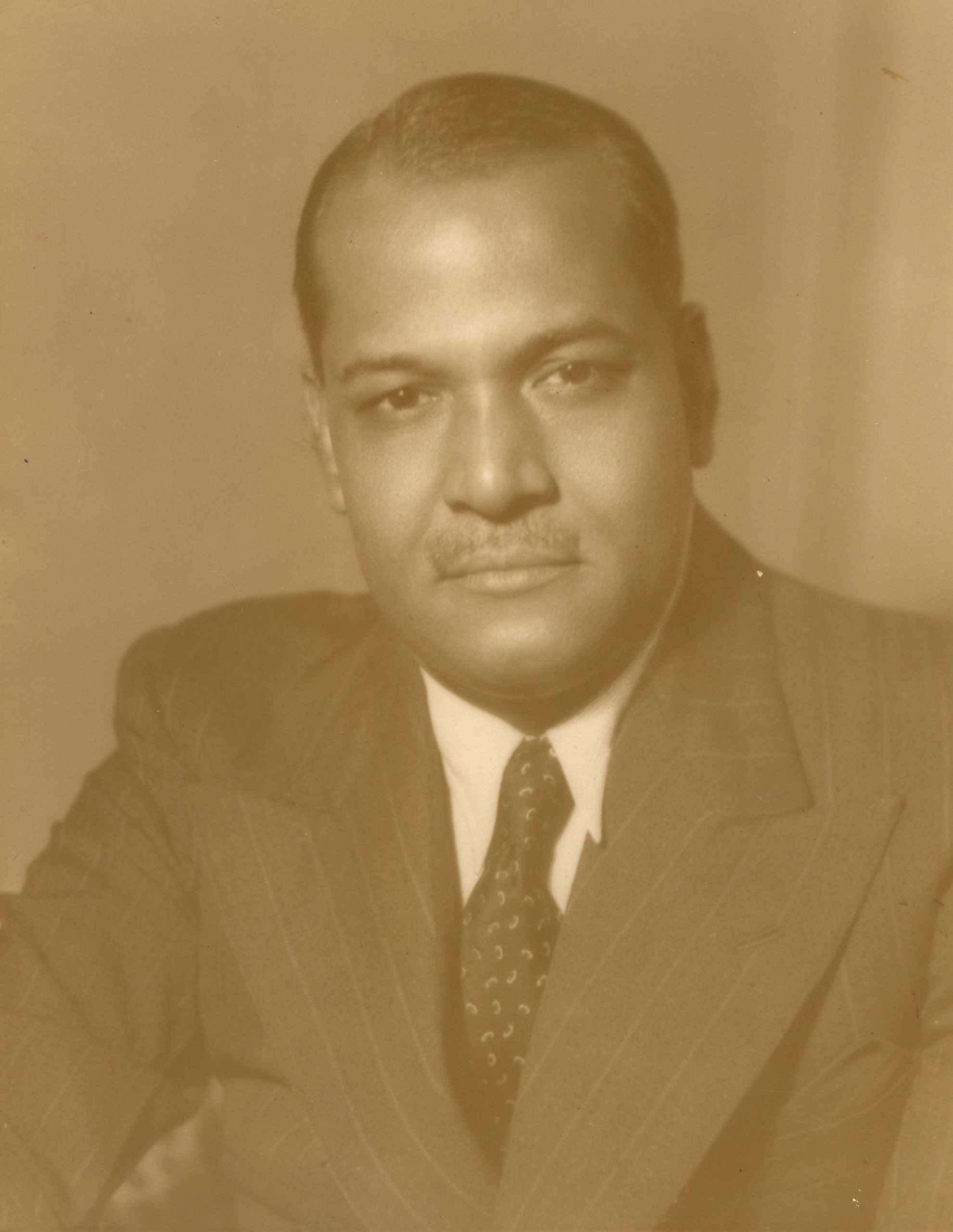
- Goenka in 1942

Member of Parliament, Lok Sabha for Vidisha
- In office 1971 ‍–‍ 1977
- Preceded by: Pandit Shiv Sharma
- Succeeded by: Raghavji

Personal details
- Born: 22 April 1904 Darbhanga, Bengal Presidency, British India
- Died: 5 October 1991 (aged 87) Bombay, Maharashtra, India
- Party: Bharatiya Jana Sangh
- Children: B. D. Goenka
- Occupation: Media businessman

Ramnath Goenka (22 April 1904 – 5 October 1991) was an Indian newspaper publisher. He bought the majority stake of The Indian Express in 1930s. He created the Indian Express Group with various English and regional language publications. In 2000, India Today magazine, named him amongst their list of "100 People Who Shaped India". The Ramnath Goenka Excellence in Journalism Awards, named after Ramnath Goenka, are one of the awards in India in the field of journalism.

== Early life ==
Ramnath Goenka was born on 22 April 1904 in Darbhanga Bihar, to Basantlal Goenka.

== Career ==
Worked as a managing partner on a salary of 100 Rs per month from 1926 to 1936 under partner Raja Mohan Prasad in the partnership firms Murli Prasad Mohan Prasad from 1926 to 1931 and then Chunnilal Murliprasad from 1931 onwards, who were Consignee sales agents (Dubashish agents) for a British trading company importing gold, silver and cotton in India. Simultaneously, he took up a job as chief salesman of the British trading company from 1931 to 1936 on a salary of Rs. 800 per month, out of which 500 belonged to the partnership firm. This empire, along with properties, was acquired for the Trust of Raja Mohan Prasad and is held in trust by the current legal heirs.

During the Emergency Period of India, Ramnath Goenka was one of the few businessmen and journalists who opposed the Indira Gandhi government. He made a formidable team with Arun Shourie whom he appointed as editor of the Indian Express, exposing corruption and censorship.

== Member of Parliament, Lok Sabha ==
In the 1971 Indian general election, Goenka was elected as the Member of Parliament, Lok Sabha from Vidisha Lok Sabha constituency as a candidate of Bharatiya Jana Sangh.

== Death ==
Goenka died in Mumbai on 5 October 1991.

In 1997 the heirs of Ramnath Goenka made a division of the Indian Express Group into two separated operations. The northern segment was put under the control of Viveck Goenka, whereas the southern one went to the family branch of Manoj Sonthalia.
