= Indian Express Limited =

Indian news publishing company

The Indian Express Private Limited
- Type: Private
- Industry: Media
- Founded: 1932; 94 years ago
- Founder: Ramnath Goenka
- Headquarters: Sector-10, Noida, India
- Key people: Viveck Goenka
- Products: Newspaper
- Revenue: ▲₹486 crore (US$50 million) (FY24)
- Net income: ▲₹83 crore (US$8.6 million) (FY24)
- Owner: Viveck Goenka
- Website: expressgroup.indianexpress.com

Indian Express Limited (IEL), sometimes Indian Express Group, is an Indian news media publishing company. It publishes several widely circulated dailies, including The Indian Express and The Financial Express in English, the Loksatta in Marathi and the Jansatta in Hindi. The company's newspapers are published from over a dozen cities daily, including New Delhi, Mumbai, Ahmedabad, Bengaluru, Kolkata, Pune, Chandigarh, Hyderabad, Kochi, Lucknow, Jaipur, Nagpur, Vadodara and Chennai. Its weekly entertainment magazine Screen, covering the Indian film industry, also has a popular following.

On 2 November 2006, the Indian Express Group signed a print syndication deal with The Economist, which included allowing the Indian Express Group to publish surveys, some reports, and various other content published in The Economist magazine.

== Publications ==
The following brands and concerns are owned by the Group:

- The Indian Express – a national daily (English)
- The Sunday Express – a news weekly
- The Financial Express – a business daily
- Loksatta – Marathi daily
- Lokprabha – Marathi weekly
- Jansatta – Hindi daily for North India
- Screen (magazine) – Periodical dealing with the film and entertainment industry
- Express Online – the portal for hosting IndianExpress.com, FinancialExpress.com, ScreenIndia.com, Tamil.indianexpress.com, Jansatta.com, Loksatta.com and Lokprabha.com, ExpressCricket.in, and KashmirLive.com

== Other ventures ==
=== Business Publications Division ===
Established in 1990, the division manages leading B2B publications and events catering to major industry verticals like Information Technology, Hospitality & Travel, Pharma & Healthcare, etc.

=== Express Towers ===
Indian Express Limited earlier owned a 25-storey building named Express Towers at Marine Drive, Mumbai. The building houses offices of several corporate entities. In the year 2018, Pune based Panchsheel bought the building for 900 crores.
