= The Inquilab =

Urdu-language daily newspaper

- Type: Daily newspaper
- Format: Print
- Owner: Jagran Prakashan Limited
- Publisher: Jagran Prakashan Limited
- Editor: Abdul Wadood Sajid (North), Shahid Latif (Mumbai)
- Founded: 1938
- Language: Urdu

The Inquilab is an Urdu-language daily newspaper published in India. It is owned by the Jagran Prakashan Limited, which also publishes Dainik Jagran. In 2017 it claimed a circulation of 127,255. It was founded by Abdul Hamid Ansari in 1938 as an underground newspaper during India's freedom movement against British.

In 2010, Jagran Prakashan acquired Midday group, the parent company of Inquilab. While originally published from Mumbai, Inquilab expanded under its new ownership in northern parts of India, and overtook Rashtriya Sahara as the most read Urdu newspaper.
