= Rajasthan Patrika =

Indian Hindi-Rajasthani language newspaper

- 29 February 2012 front page of Rajasthan Patrika
- Type: Daily newspaper
- Format: Broadsheet
- Owner: Rajasthan Patrika Pvt. Ltd.
- Founder: Karpoor Chand Kulish
- News editor: Gulab Kothari
- Founded: 7 March 1956; 70 years ago
- Political alignment: neutral
- Language: Hindi & Rajasthani
- Headquarters: Jaipur, Rajasthan
- Circulation: 1,385,000 Daily (as of April 2023)
- Website: www.patrika.com
- Free online archives: epaper.patrika.com

Rajasthan Patrika (lit. 'The Rajasthan Newsletter') is an Indian Hindi-Rajasthani language daily newspaper. It was founded by Karpoor Chandra Kulish in 1956 and published as Rajasthan Patrika in Delhi and Rajasthan, and as Patrika in 9 other states.

As per Indian Readership Survey 2013, Rajasthan Patrika emerged as the fourth most-read Hindi language newspaper in India, and Patrika emerged sixth.

== History ==
Rajasthan Patrika was founded by Karpoor Chandra Kulish on 7 March 1956. Mr. Karpoor Chand Kulish is follower of Jain religion. Over the years, it became a leading national daily.

== Editions ==
Rajasthan Patrika prints editions in New Delhi and the seven cities of Chhattisgarh (in Bilaspur, Jagdalpur and Raipur), Gujarat (in Ahmedabad and Surat), Karnataka (in Bangalore and Hubli), Madhya Pradesh (under the shorter name of Patrika in Bhopal, Gwalior, Indore, Jabalpur, Ujjain and eight other cities), Rajasthan in (Jaipur, Jodhpur, Kota, Gangapur City and 13 other cities) and in Tamil Nadu (at Chennai and Coimbatore).

Early in 2015, Rajasthan Patrika announced a Delhi-based English news website, called Catch News under the aegis of senior journalist and editor Shoma Chaudhry.
Rajasthan Patrika also publish two bimonthly Hindi language child magazines — "Balhans" and "Chotu-Motu".

== Notable columnist ==
- Feroze Varun Gandhi

== See also ==
- The Hindu
- List of newspapers in India by circulation
- List of newspapers in the world by circulation
