= Amar Ujala =

Indian Hindi-language daily newspaper

- Type: Daily newspaper
- Format: Broadsheet
- Owner(s): Rajul Maheshwari and Sneh Maheshwari
- Founders: Murari lal Maheshwari; Dori Lal Agarwal
- Publisher: Amar Ujala Limited (Previously known as Amar Ujala Publications Limited)
- Founded: 1948; 78 years ago
- Language: Hindi
- Headquarters: Noida, Uttar Pradesh
- Country: India
- Circulation: 1,744,512 (as of April 2023)
- Readership: 9.65 million
- Website: www.amarujala.com

Amar Ujala (lit. 'The Immortal Brightness') is a Hindi-language daily newspaper published in India which was founded in 1948. It has 22 editions in six states and two union territories covering 180 districts. It has a circulation of around two million copies. The 2019 Indian Readership Survey reported that with 9.65 million it had the 4th-largest daily readership amongst newspapers in India.

Amar Ujala was founded in Agra in 1948. In 1994, Amar Ujala, along with another Hindi daily, shared nearly 70 per cent of the Hindi newspaper readership in the state of Uttar Pradesh. Amar Ujala sold 4.5 lakh copies through its five editions.

Amar Ujala publishes a daily 16- to 18-page issue, as well as supplements focusing on matters such as careers, lifestyle, entertainment and women.

== Editions ==
Amar Ujala has 22 editions, in six states (Uttarakhand, Himachal Pradesh, Haryana, Punjab, Delhi NCR and Uttar Pradesh) and two union territories (Chandigarh, Jammu & Kashmir) covering 180 districts.

Amarujala.com is one of the leading Hindi news websites catering to 60mn+ users across India. As of December 2022, Amarujala.com has 8.4mn followers on Facebook and 3.89 million subscribers on YouTube.

MyResultPlus is also owned and managed by Amar Ujala Web Services Pvt Ltd.
