= Indian Readership Survey =

Continuous readership research study

The Indian Readership Survey (IRS) is the largest continuous readership research study in the world with an annual sample size exceeding 2.56 lakh (256,000) respondents. IRS collects a comprehensive range of demographic information and provides extensive coverage of consumer and product categories, including cars, household appliances, household durables, household care and personal care products, food and beverages, finance and holidays. IRS is not restricted to survey of readership alone but is synonymous with both readership and consumption across various FMCG (Fast-Moving Consumer Goods) products throughout India. IRS covers information on over 100 product categories. IRS is conducted by MRUC (Media Research Users Council) and RSCI (Readership Studies Council of India).

== Evolution ==
IRS was launched in the year 1995 with an objective of setting an industry standard for readership & other media measurement, & to provide insights on media & product consumption as well as consumer behavior patterns. In the year 1995-96, 23 Metro Reports were released followed by the All-India Report consisting of urban and rural data. Simultaneously a software program was developed to not just enable the optimum use of raw data but to also carry out multimedia planning which provided a common basis of media evaluation. Over the years IRS has evolved to be very progressive, covering a broad spectrum of categories from Media data, Indian Demographics, Indian Market, Product Profiles, to the recently developed Telecom Report, TV Report, and IRS Countryside. Apart from a range of products offered new changes have been introduced in the method of classification of sub-regions from SCR's to ISD's, which is a more microscopic view of the consumer profile based on the socio−cultural ethnicity. From a user's perspective, a few introductions in the form of participative sampling, customized queries have been introduced. Sub Metro level reporting for a better understanding of the consumer behavior patterns across different zones in the Metros & Edition wise reporting is the other recent introduction.

== Methodology ==
IRS covers nearly 70 cities, 1178 towns and 2894 villages with the coverage being reviewed before the start of every round. The universe for IRS has been defined as the total resident urban and rural population of India aged 12 years and over. The survey excludes the offshore territories such as Lakshadweep and Andaman and Nicobar Islands. North-Eastern states (excluding Assam) and Jammu and Kashmir (excluding Srinagar) are also excluded from the survey.

=== Sampling ===
- The annual sample spread exceeds 2.56 lakh (256,000) respondents with continuous fieldwork spread across 10 months of the year
- Sample allocated proportionate to 12 years+ Universe of a geographic unit
- More than 1 Lakh towns are sampled
- All publication towns and districts are sampled in the four rounds
- Remaining towns and non-publication districts are randomly sampled
- Rural Sampling: Once a district is selected, 2 Talukas from the district are randomly sampled

=== Universe projection and weightlifting ===
- The IRS data is weighted to the census universe
- Since the Census is conducted every ten years, the estimated population for any given date is calculated by using the growth rate in between two census points.
- Projection of Universe = the midpoint date of the Fieldwork period.
- E.g. for FW period Jan to December the Population of India is projected to June using CDGR. (Cumulative Daily Growth Rate) Universe projections of over 1000 sub-units is accrued to arrive at the All-India Universe.
- Each weighting unit is divided into a number of weighting cells to create a weighting matrix for projecting the data.

=== Household and individual collection ===
- The first Household in a cluster is randomly selected based on the electoral rolls
- Remaining Households selected using Right Hand Rule
- Individual selection made using Kish grid
- Kish grid designed to maintain age X gender proportion in the sample.

== Significance ==
IRS is the single source survey for media and product ownership/usage. The prime objective of the study is to collect readership information from a cross-section of individuals, in great detail, so as to present a true and unbiased picture of their readership habits. On the media front, it also captures information on television and cinema viewing habits, radio listening habits and Internet usage. In addition to this, IRS captures information on various FMCG (Fast Moving Consumer Goods) products, usage and consumption and durable ownership amongst households. Since media and product ownership/ consumption information is captured from the same household, it enables linkages between the media and product data. IRS equips you with information that is truly reflective of the Indian population for making informed decisions.

== Controversy ==
Leading newspaper groups of India have jointly condemned the 2013 Indian Readership Survey, calling it badly flawed demanding withdrawal of the survey and a change in methodology.

== See also ==
- Audit Bureau of Circulations (India)
