= List of magazines in India =

This is a list of magazines published in India, sorted on basis of language.

== Arabic ==
- Al-Baas El-Islami - monthly magazine of Darul Uloom Nadwatul Ulama
- Al-Daie – monthly magazine of Darul Uloom Deoband
- Al-Kifah – former fortnightly magazine of Jamiat Ulema-e-Hind
- Al-Raid – biweekly magazine of Darul Uloom Nadwatul Ulama
- Al-Ziya - former monthly magazine of Darul Uloom Nadwatul Ulama
- Da'watul Haq – former quarterly magazine of Darul Uloom Deoband

== Assamese ==
- Bismoi – monthly magazine
- Gariyoshi (গৰীয়সী) – monthly magazine
- Prantik – fortnightly magazine
- Roopkar – monthly magazine

== Bengali ==
- Anandalok (আনন্দলোক) – biweekly magazine
- Anandamela (আনন্দমেলা) – fortnightly magazine (5th & 20th of every month)
- Desh magazine (দেশ) – fortnightly magazine (2nd & 17th of every month)
- Grihshobha (গৃহশোভা) – biweekly women's magazine
- Sananda (সানন্দা) – women's magazine
- Saptahik Bartaman (সাপ্তাহিক বর্তমান) – weekly magazine
- Unish-Kuri (উনিশ কুড়ি) – fortnightly magazine focused on young adults

== Dogri ==
- Shiraza Dogri – bimonthly literary magazine

== English ==
- Aside - news magazine
- Better Interiors – interior design
- Business India – bimonthly
- Business Today – fortnightly
- Businessworld – fortnightly
- The Caravan – journal of politics and culture, published by Delhi Press
- CFO India – monthly
- Champak – children's magazine
- Children's World
- Competition Success Review
- CTO Forum – monthly
- Dataquest – fortnightly information technology
- Debonair
- Digit – IT gadgets and mobile phones
- Down to Earth – fortnightly politics of environment and development magazine
- Electronics For You – technology monthly
- Express Computer – monthly information technology
- Femina India – women's magazine
- FHM India – monthly
- Filmfare – Bollywood magazine
- Forbes India – business magazine
- Frontline – current affairs magazine
- Goa Today
- Gobar Times – monthly environmental education magazine for young adults
- GQ – Indian edition
- Himal Southasian
- India Today
- Indrajal Comics - comic book series from the Times of India
- Intelligent Computing CHIP magazine
- New India Samachar – fortnightly magazine by Indian government
- New Woman
- OPEN – current affairs and features magazine
- Open Source For You – monthly
- Organiser – weekly current affairs magazine
- Outlook
- Overdrive
- ParentCircle – parenting magazine
- PCQuest – technology publication
- Psychologs – monthly mental health magazine
- Reader's Digest – monthly general interest family magazine
- Rock Street Journal – covering the Indian independent music scene
- Sanctuary Asia
- Science Reporter
- Screen
- Society – monthly celebrity/lifestyle magazine
- Sportstar
- Swarajya
- Tehelka – news weekly
- Tinkle – children's magazine
- Time Magazine Asia – weekly
- Tinpahar – bimonthly, bilingual
- Today's Traveller
- Vedanta Kesari – monthly cultural/spiritual, inspired by Vivekananda and Ramakrishna
- Verve
- Vogue – monthly fashion and lifestyle magazine
- The Week
- Woman's Era – food fashion and lifestyle magazine

== Gujarati ==
- Buddhiprakash
- Champak – children's magazine
- Chetana
- Chitralekha (Gujarati: ચિત્રલેખા) – weekly
- Dalitchetna
- Dhabak
- Doot
- Gazalvishwa
- Grihshobha – biweekly women's magazine
- Gujarati
- Kavilok
- Kumar
- Parivesh
- Ruchi
- Safari – monthly science magazine
- Shabdasrishti

== Hindi ==
- Akhand Jyoti (Hindi: अखण्ड ज्योति)
- Champak
- Femina India – women's magazine
- Grihshobha – biweekly women's magazine
- Hans (हंस)
- Kadambini
- Madhu Muskan
- Meri Saheli
- Overdrive
- Parag
- Pratiyogita Darpan
- Saras Salil
- Sarita
- Vanita
- Yog Sandesh

== Kannada ==
- Balamangala – children's magazine
- Champaka – children's magazine
- Chutuka – children's magazine
- Grihshobha – biweekly women's magazine
- Karmaveera – weekly
- Kasthuri
- Mangala
- Mayura
- O Manase, fortnightly
- Roopatara
- Sakhi
- Slum Jagathu
- Sudha – weekly
- Taranga – weekly
- Tunturu – children's magazine
- Tushara

== Konkani ==
- Dor Mhoineachi Rotti – monthly
- Raknno – weekly
- Vauraddeancho Ixtt – weekly

== Malayalam ==
- Balabhumi
- Balamangalam
- Balarama
- Bhashaposhini
- Bobanum Moliyum
- Champak – children's magazine
- Chandrika – weekly
- Chithrabhumi
- Cinema Mangalam
- Desabhimani – weekly
- Dhanam
- Eureka
- Grihshobha – biweekly women's magazine
- Kalakaumudi
- Kanyaka
- Kerala Kaumudi – weekly
- Labour India
- Madhyamam Weekly
- Mangalam Weekly
- Manorama Weekly
- Mathrubhumi – illustrated weekly
- Poompatta
- Prabodhanam
- Samakalika Malayalam
- Vanitha
- Vellinakshatram

== Marathi ==
- Sadhana (weekly) – Weekly magazine
- Champak – children's magazine
- Chitralekha (Marathi: चित्रलेखा) – weekly
- Grihshobha – biweekly women's magazine

== Odia ==
- Kadambini – monthly
- Saptahik Samaya (Odia: ସପ୍ତହିକ) – weekly

== Tamil ==
- Ananda Vikatan
- Champak – children's magazine
- Cinema Express
- Femina India – women's magazine
- Grihshobha – biweekly women's magazine
- Kalki
- Kumudam
- Kungumam
- Puthiya Thalaimurai
- Sigappunada
- Thuglak
- Vikatan

== Telugu ==
- Andhra Bhoomi
- Andhra Prabha
- Annadata – agricultural magazine
- Champak – children's magazine
- Chandamama – monthly children's magazine
- Eenadu – weekly magazine
- Grihshobha – biweekly women's magazine
- Rythubandhu – agricultural magazine
- Sapthagiri – monthly devotional magazine
- Swathi – weekly

== Urdu ==
- Al-Nadwa
- Biswin Sadi
- Darul Uloom
- Din Dunia
- Kashful Akhbar
- Ma'arif
- Monthly Darul Uloom
- Shabkhoon
- Shair
- Shama
- Tameer-e-Hayat

== See also ==
- Media of India

Lists

- List of Indian comics
- List of newspapers in India
- List of radio stations in India
- List of Indian TV channels
- List of Indian films
