= List of Malayalam-language periodicals =

The following is a list of periodicals and online magazines published in the Malayalam language.

== General interest, news and literature ==
Nerpatham	Frequency	Format	Publisher
Samoohyapadam Masika	Monthly	Print	D Suvarnakumar
samadarshi	daily	Print	Kamalalayam
Bhashaposhini	Monthly	Print	Malayala Manorama
Kesari (magazine)	Weekly	Print, online	Hindustan Prakashan
Chandrika Weekly	Weekly	Print	Chandrika
Deshabhimani Weekly	Weekly	Print	Deshabhimani
Starvision News Malayalam	Daily	Online	Starvision Global
India Today	Weekly	Print	India Today
Jayakeralam	Weekly	Print	
Kalakaumudi	Weekly	Print	Kalakaumudi
Katha	Weekly	Print	Kalakaumudi
Kerala Kamudi Weekly	Weekly	Print	Kerala Kaumudi
Keraleeyam	Monthly	Print, online	Jagrathayude Keraleeyam
Keralashabdam	Weekly	Print	Keralashabdam Group
Kumkumam	Monthly	Print	Keralashabdam Group
Madhyamam Weekly	Weekly	Print	Madhyamam
Malayalanaadu Vaarika	Weekly	Print	New India Press
Manorama Weekly	Weekly	Print	Malayala Manorama
Mangalam Weekly	Weekly	Print	Mangalam
Mathrubhumi Illustrated Weekly	Weekly	Print	Mathrubhumi
Manorajyam	Weekly	Print	Manorajyam
Navayugom	Fortnightly	Print	Janayugom
Pachakuthira	Monthly	Print	DC Books
Pouradhwani	Weekly	Print	Pouradhwani Group
Prabodhanam	Weekly	Print	Islamic Services Trust
Puzha Magazine		Online	
Samakalika Malayalam Vaarika	Weekly	Print	The New Indian Express
Risala Weekly	Weekly	Print	Islamic Publishing Bureau Sunni Students Federation
Ezhuthu Chinthikkunna Hrudayangalkku	Monthly	Print	Loyola Research Institute of Peace and International Relations
Vachakam	Weekly	Print & Online	Vachakam News Ltd.
Asaadhu	Monthly	Print	
Paakkanaar	Monthly	Print	Vettoor Raman Nair

== Agriculture ==
Name	Frequency	Type	Parent publication/ published by
Karshakan	Monthly	Print	Deepika
Karshakasree	Monthly	Print	Malayala Manorama
Kerala Karshakan	Monthly	Print	Farm Information Bureau, Government of Kerala
Krishi Jagaran	Monthly	Print	Krishi Jagaran

== Family ==
Name	Frequency	Type	Parent publication/ published by
Madhyamam Kudumbam	Monthly	Print	Madhyamam

== Business and economics ==
Name	Frequency	Type	Parent publication/ published by
Dhanam	Fortnightly	Print	Dhanam Publications
Business Deepika	Monthly	Print	Deepika
Emerging Kerala	Monthly	Print	DC Books
Money Indices	Monthly	Print	DC Books
Sambadhyam	Monthly	Print	Malayala Manorama

== Children's magazines and comics ==
Name	Frequency	Type	Parent publication/ published by
Balakeralam	Monthly	Print	Pouradhwani Group
Balarama (magazine)	Weekly	Print and E book	Malayala Manorama
Balarama Digest	Weekly	Print and E book	Malayala Manorama
Balarama Amar Chitra Katha	Fortnightly	Print and E book	Malayala Manorama
Balabhumi	Weekly	Print and E book	Mathrubhumi
Balamangalam	Weekly	Stopped	Mangalam
Boban and Molly	Monthly	Print	Toms
Cartoon Plus	Fortnightly	Print	Mathrubhumi
Chitrakatha	Weekly	Print	Mangalam
Eureka	Monthly	Print	Kerala Sasthra Sahithya Parishad
Kalikkudukka	Weekly	Print	Malayala Manorama
Kalicheppu	Weekly	Print	Mangalam
Kusumam	Monthly	Print	Sunni Jamiyyathul Muallimeen of "Samastha Kerala Jamiyyathul Ulama (A.p Faction)
Kurunnukal	Monthly	Print	Samastha Kerala Jam'iyyathul Mu'allimeen of "Samastha Kerala Jamiyyathul Ulama" (E.K Faction)
Kuttikalude Deepika	Fortnightly	Print and E Book	Deepika
Malarvadi	Monthly	Stopped	Prabodhanam
Muthassi	Fortnightly	Stopped	Kerala Sabdam
Muthuchippi	Monthly		Kerala Sabdam
Mayilpeeli	Monthly	Print and E book	Balagokulam
Mandoose	Monthly	Print	Toms
Minnaminni	Fortnightly	Print	Mathrubhumi
PAICO Classics			Paico
Poompatta	Fortnightly	Stopped	Sooryaprabha Publications
Thathamma	Fortnightly	Stopped	Deshabhimani
Unnikuttan	Fortnightly	Stopped	Toms

== Education and career ==
Educational
Name	Frequency	Type	Parent publication/ published by
Education Insider	Monthly	Print	DC Books
Labour India	Monthly	Print	Labour India Publications
Madhyamam Vidhya	Yearly	Print	Madhyamam
Schoolmaster	Monthly	Print	V Publishers
Thozhil Vartha	Weekly	Print	Mathrubhumi
Thozhil Veedhi	Weekly	Print	Malayala Manorama
Vijaya Veedhi		Print	Malayala Manorama

== Film ==
Name	Frequency	Type	Parent publication/ published by
Chalachithram			Manorajyam
Chithrabhumi	Weekly	Print	Mathrubhumi
Cinema Mangalam	Weekly	Print	Mangalam
Film Magazine	Weekly	Print	Kalakaumudi
Nana	Weekly	Print	Keralashabdam Group
Rashtradeepika Cinema	Weekly	Print	Deepika
Vellinakshatram	Weekly	Print	Kalakaumudi

== Health ==
Name	Frequency	Type	Parent publication/ published by
Arogya Madhyamam	Monthly	Print	Madhyamam
Arogya Mangalam	Monthly	Print	Mangalam
Arogya Masika	Monthly	Print	Mathrubhumi
Arogyam	Monthly	Print	Malayala Manorama
Ayurarogyam	Monthly	Print	Kalakaumudi

== Home ==
Home
Name	Frequency	Type	Parent publication/ published by
Madhyamam Griham	Yearly	Print	Madhyamam
Vanitha Veedu	Print	Monthly	Malayala Manorama

== Science and technology ==
Name	Frequency	Type	Parent publication/ published by
Eureka	Monthly	Print	Kerala Sasthra Sahithya Parishad
LUCA	Daily	Online	Kerala Sasthra Sahithya Parishad
Sasthrakeralam	Monthly	Print	Kerala Sasthra Sahithya Parishad
Info kairali	Monthly	Print	Info kairali books

== Society and women ==
Name	Frequency	Type	Parent publication/ published by
Aaramam Weekly	Weekly	Online	
Grihalakshmi (magazine)	Fortnightly	Print	Mathrubhumi
Grihshobha	Monthly	Print	Delhi Press
Kanyaka	Fortnightly	Print	Mangalam
Kumari	Weekly	Print	Keralashabdam Group
Mahilachandrika	Fortnightly	Print	Chandrika
Sahayathrika			
Snehitha	Monthly	Print	Kalakaumudi
Sthree Dhanam	Monthly	Print	Deepika
Vanitha	Fortnightly	Print	Malayala Manorama

== Pre-Independence Era Malayalam women's magazines ==
Name	Years in Print	Type	Place of Publication
Kerali Sugunabodhini	1886	Print	Thiruvananthapuram
Sharada	1904–1910	Print	Thripunithura
Lakshmibai	1905–1940	Print	Thrissur
Sharada	1913–1924	Print	Thiruvananthapuram/Punalur
Bhashasharada	1915–1919	Print	Punalur
Mahilaratnam	1916	Print	Thiruvananthapuram
Sumangala	1916	Print	Kayamkulam
Sanghamitra	1920	Print	Kollam
(Christhava) Mahilamani	1920–1940s	Print	Thiruvalla
Mahila	1921–1941	Print	Thiruvananthapuram/Thiruvalla/Chengannur
Sevini	1924	Print	Kollam
Araya Stree Jana Masika	1924	Print	Karunagapally
Muslim Mahila	1926	Print	Cochin
Sahodari	1925–1940s	Print	Kollam
Vanitha Kusumam	1927	Print	Kottayam

== Spiritual and astrology ==
Name	Frequency	Type	Parent publication/ published by
Sunnath	Monthly	Print	Sunni jam iyyathul Muallimeen Samastha Kerala Jamiyyathul Ulama (AP faction)
Sunni Voice	Fortnightly	Print	Samastha Kerala Sunni Yuvajana Sangam Samastha Kerala Jamiyyathul Ulama (AP faction)
Al Mu'allim	Monthly	Print	Samastha Kerala Jam'iyyathul Mu'allimeen Samastha Kerala Jamiyyathul Ulama (EK faction)
GulfSathyadhara	Monthly	Print	Published by SKSSF State Committee from Dubai, UAE
Jyothisha Bhooshanam	Fortnightly	Print	Mangalam
Muhurtham	Monthly	Print	Kalakaumudi

== Travel ==
Name	Frequency	Type	Parent publication/ published by
Mathrubhumi Yathra	Monthly	Print	Mathrubhumi
Travel and Flavors	Monthly	Print	DC Books
Traveller	Monthly	Print	Malayala Manorama
