= List of magazines in Hindi =

This is a list of Hindi-language magazines.

| Name | Founded | Frequency | Coverage | Individuals | Owner |
|---|---|---|---|---|---|
| Meri Saheli (मेरी सहेली) | 1987 | Monthly | women's magazine | Pratibha Tiwari | Pioneer Books Pvt Ltd |
| Akhand Jyoti (अखण्ड ज्योति) | January; 1938 | Monthly | Scientific Spirituality | Pranav Pandya | Akhand Jyoti Sansthan, Mathura |
| Chakmak (चकमक) | 1985 | monthly | children's magazine | | Eklavya foundation |
| Champak (चंपक) | 1968 | fortnightly | children's magazine | | Delhi Press |
| Chandamama (चंदामामा) | | monthly | children's magazine | | Chandamama India Limited |
| Grihshobha (गृहशोभा) | 1979 | monthly | women's magazine | | Delhi Press |
| India Today (Hindi) (इंडिया टुडे) | | weekly | newsmagazine | | The India Today Group |
| Kadambini (कादंबिनी) | | monthly | literary magazine | | Hindustan Times Media |
| Sarita (सरिता) | | fortnightly | general interest family magazine | Mati Hindi Monthly Magazine | |

== See also ==
- List of magazines in India
