= K. A. Beena =

Malayalam-language Indian writer

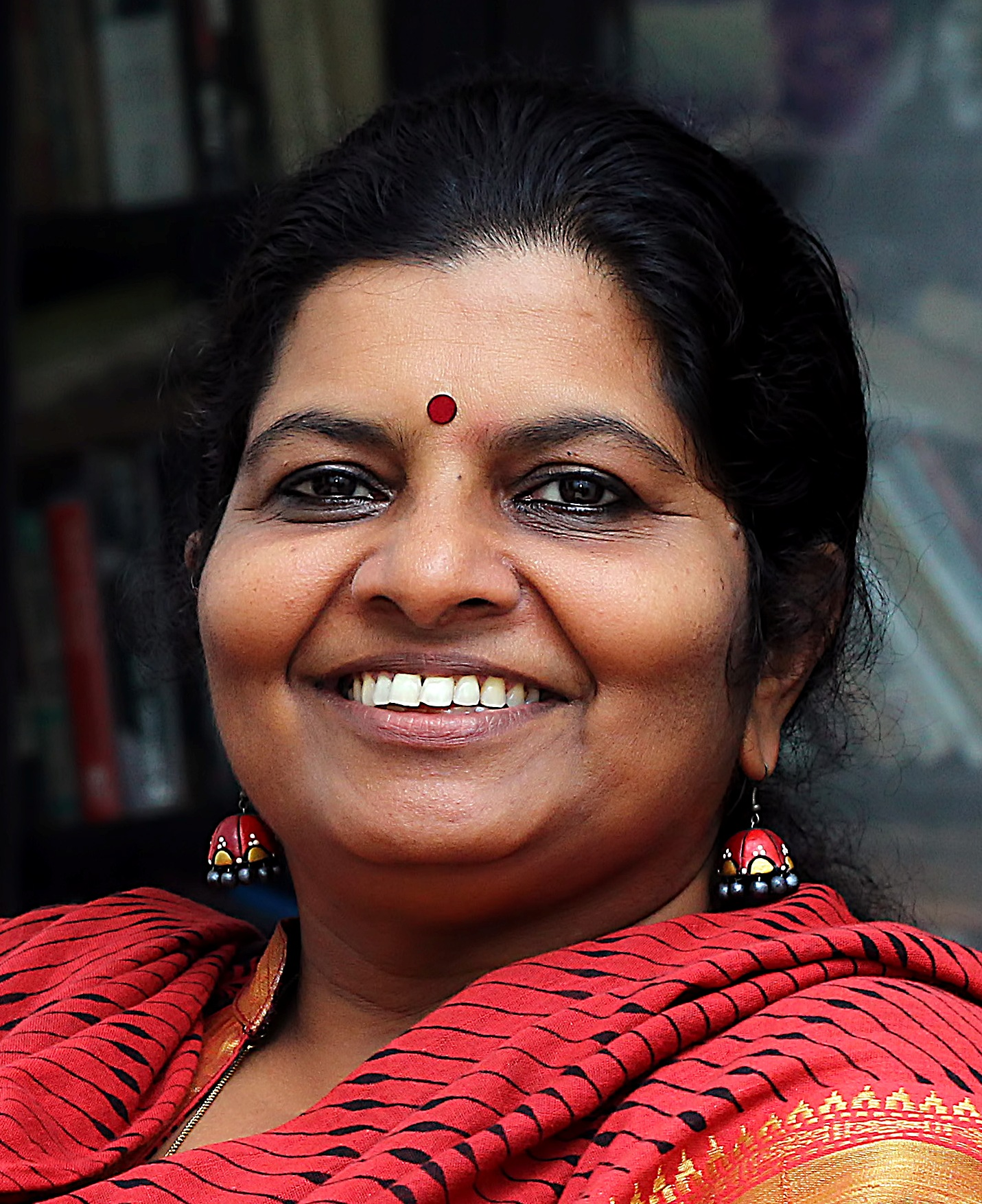
- Born: 11 November 1964 (age 61); Thiruvananthapuram, Kerala, India
- Occupations: Writer, journalist, columnist
- Writing career
- Notable work: Beena Kanda Russia
- Website: kabeena.in

K. A. Beena is an Indian author, journalist, and columnist who writes in Malayalam on a variety of topics, particularly social issues affecting women. Her publications include memoirs, magazine articles, travelogues, children's books, essay collections, short stories, and history books about journalism and media. She is now retired as deputy director for the Ministry of Information and Broadcasting's Bureau of Outreach and Communication.

== Early life and family ==
She was born in Vazhayila, Trivandrum district of Kerala, the daughter of journalist M. Karunakaran Nair and his wife Ambika. She has a Master's degree in journalism and English literature from the University of Kerala and wrote her thesis about K. Balakrishnan. Her husband, Baiju Chandran, is now retired from Doordarshan as deputy director of Doordarshan Thiruvanandapuram. They have at least one child, filmmaker Ritwik Baiju.

== Career ==
Beena started writing in her early school days, completing Beena Kanda Russia, a travelogue, at the age of 13. It published for the first time in 1981. The book recounts her experiences of attending the International Children's camp at Artek in the Ukrainian SSR in 1977. In 1987, she became the assistant editor for Kerala Kaumudi women's magazine and moved to the Mathrubhumi Printing And Publishing Company in 1989. In 1991, she joined the Indian Information Service for the Government of India and worked as the news editor of All India Radio and Doordarshan. She also worked in the Press Information Bureau and Directorate of Advertising and Visual Publicity.

Beena is a regular columnist in many Malayalam-language publications, including the Kerala Kaumudi daily Adayalangal, the Mathrubhumi online Akakazcha, the Manorama online Vakkukalkappuram, and the Deshabhimani weekly Vazhivilakku. She has also contributed to Vanitha, Kanyaka, and the Deshabhimani daily Malayalam news. Beena travels to villages around India and writes about the rural settings. Her 2008 travelogue Brahmaputhrayile veedu is of her travel experiences in Northeast India; others include Chuvadukal and Nadi Thinnunna Dweep. Her book on Vaikom Muhammed Basheer, Basheer Enna Anugraham, is a memoir and tribute to the writer and details their unusual friendship. Beena also writes novels for children, including Ammakkuttiyude Lokam and Ammakkuttiyude School. Perumazhayath is a memoir about nostalgia and friendship, and Sheethanidra and Kaumaram Kadannu Varunnathu are both short story collections. Radio Kathayum Kalayum details the history of radio broadcasting in Malayalam and Date line – Charithathe Chirakilettiyavar contains biographies of 17 veteran journalists in Kerala.

She is now retired as deputy director of the Ministry of Information and Broadcasting's Bureau of Outreach and Communication.

== Awards ==
- 2010: Akashvani Annual Award for best script, Prasar Bharati
- 2014: Laadli Media Award for digital and print, United Nations Population Fund and Population First, Mumbai
- 2015: Rajalekshmy Award for literary contribution
- 2016: Laadli Media Award for digital and print, United Nations Population Fund and Population first, Mumbai
- 2016: V.K. Madhavankutty Award for print media, Trivandrum Press Club
- 2019: Sheela Teacher Award for socially committed journalism work, Central Board of Secondary Education
- 2023: Kerala Bala Sahithya Academy award 2023 for children's literature.

== Selected works ==
- 1981: Beena Kanda Russia – travelogue. ISBN 9788124017159
- 2005: Koumaram Kadannu Varunnath – Short Stories
- 2008: Brahmaputhrayile Veedu – travelogue, ISBN 9789354828874
- 2008: Radio Kathayum Kalayum – Malayalam radio broadcasting history
- 2010: Dateline – Charithrathe Chirakilettiyuavar, ISBN 9788122608854
- 2010: Ammakkuttiyude School – children's literature
- 2011: Bhootha Kannadi – essay collection, ISBN 9788130012100
- 2012: Madhyamangalkku Parayanullathu – children's literature
- 2012: Sheethanidra – Short Stories
- 2013: Basheer Enna Anugraham – memoir
- 2015: Basheerinte Kathukal – memoir
- 2015: Chuvadukal – travelogue, ISBN 9788124020128
- 2015: Perumazhayath – memoir
- 2015: Kadannal – essay collection
- 2017: Kuttikkalam – memoir, ISBN 9788126475032
- 2017: Sanitary padinte anthima rahasyam – essay collection, ISBN 9789386637185
- 2017: Ammakkuttiyude Lokam – children's literature, ISBN 9788126465170
- 2018: Athirthiyude Athiru – memoir, ISBN 9789352823369
- 2019: Kathakal – Stort Stories
- 2021: Pathrajeevithangal - Media history
- 2022: Miliyude Aaakasham – children's literature
- 2022: Rosum Koottukarum – children's literature, ISBN 9789355495549
- 2023: Venalil Pootha Maram – Children's Novel
- 2023: Unmadiyude munnile Alice – Essays
- 2023: Oh Mihrin– Children's Literature
- 2024: Aa Kasera Aarudethanu? - Travelogue, Village studies
- 2024: Mannequin - Short Stories
