= List of comics and comic strips made into feature films =

This is a list of comics or comic strips that have been made into feature films. The title of the work is followed by the work's author, the title of the film, and the year of the film. If a film has an alternate title based on geographical distribution, the title listed will be that of the widest distribution area.

Where noted with "char" or "concept", the characters or concepts from a work have been used, but the script may have been original and not based on a specific work.

== 0-9 ==
- 30 Days of Night, Steve Niles - 30 Days of Night, 2007
- 300, Frank Miller - 300, 2007

== A-Z ==
- Ace Drummond, Eddie Rickenbacker - Ace Drummond, 1936
- The Adventures of Smilin' Jack, Zack Mosley - The Adventures of Smilin' Jack, 1943
- Art School Confidential, Daniel Clowes - Art School Confidential, 2006
- Asterix and Cleopatra, René Goscinny and Albert Uderzo - Asterix & Obelix: Mission Cleopatra, 2002
- Asterix and Cleopatra, René Goscinny and Albert Uderzo - Asterix and Cleopatra, 1968
- Asterix and the Great Crossing, René Goscinny and Albert Uderzo - Asterix Conquers America, 1994
- Asterix and the Normans, René Goscinny and Albert Uderzo - Asterix and the Vikings, 2006
- Asterix and the Soothsayer, René Goscinny and Albert Uderzo - Asterix and the Big Fight, 1989
- Asterix at the Olympic Games, René Goscinny and Albert Uderzo - Astérix aux Jeux Olympiques, 2008
- Asterix in Britain, René Goscinny and Albert Uderzo - Asterix in Britain, 1986
- Asterix the Gaul, René Goscinny and Albert Uderzo - Asterix the Gaul, 1967
- Asterix the Legionary and Asterix the Gladiator, René Goscinny and Albert Uderzo - Asterix Versus Caesar, 1985
- Batman, Bob Kane and Bill Finger - Batman Begins (char)
- Blade, Marv Wolfman and Gene Colan - Blade II (char), 2002
- Boban and Molly, Toms - Bobanum Moliyum (char), (1971)
- Bokkō, Ken'ichi Sakemi - A Battle of Wits, 2006
- Casper the Friendly Ghost, Seymour Reit and Joe Oriolo - Casper (char), 1995
- Daredevil, Frank Miller - Elektra (char), 2005
- Fantastic Four, Stan Lee and Jack Kirby - The Fantastic Four, 1994; Fantastic Four, 2005; Fantastic Four: Rise of the Silver Surfer, 2007
- Flash Gordon, Alex Raymond - Flash Gordon, 1980
- Hellblazer, Alan Moore - Constantine, 2005
- Hulk, Stan Lee and Jack Kirby
- Justice League, Gardner Fox - Justice League: Worlds Collide
- The League of Extraordinary Gentlemen, Alan Moore - The League of Extraordinary Gentlemen,
- Mirko i Slavko, Desimir Žižović Buin - Mirko i Slavko, 1973
- Monica's Gang, Mauricio de Sousa
- Mortadelo y Filemón, Francisco Ibáñez - La gran aventura de Mortadelo y Filemón, 2003
- Motu Patlu, Kripa Shankar Bhardwaj - Motu Patlu: King of Kings (char), (2016)
- "My Mania: 13th Quiz Show" (comic book episode), Eakasit Thairaat - 13 Beloved, 2006
- Poem Strip, Dino Buzzati – Orfeo, 2025
- The Punisher War Zone, John Romita, Jr. - Punisher: War Zone, 2008
- Sin City, Frank Miller - Sin City, 2005
- The Sons of Rama, Anant Pai and Ram Waeerkar - Sons of Ram, 2012
- Superman, Jerry Siegel and Joe Shuster - Atom Man vs. Superman, 1950
- Tales from the Crypt, William Gaines and Al Feldstein - Tales from the Crypt, 1972
- Teenage Mutant Ninja Turtles, Kevin Eastman and Peter Laird - Teenage Mutant Ninja Turtles, 1990; Teenage Mutant Ninja Turtles II: The Secret of the Ooze, Teenage Mutant Ninja Turtles III, TMNT
- The Adventures of Tintin, Hergé - Tintin and the Temple of the Sun, 1969
- V for Vendetta, Alan Moore - V for Vendetta, 2005
- Watchmen, Alan Moore - Watchmen, 2009

== See also ==
- List of films based on comics
- List of films based on manga
