= Muthassi =

Muthassi may refer to:

- Muthassi (novel), a 1957 Malayalam-language novel by Cherukad
- Muthassi (film), a 1971 Malayalam-language film
- Muthassi (magazine), a children's Malayalam-language magazine
