= Soothran =

Malayalam comic strip

- Title logo of Soothran strip, showing Soothran (above) and Sheru (below)

Publication information
- Publisher: Balarama
- First appearance: Balarama (mid-2001)
- Created by: Luis Fernandes and N. M. Mohan
Soothran
Publication information
- Schedule: Weekly
- Format: Ongoing series
Creative team
- Written by: Madhavan Namboothiri
- Artist: Simi Muhamma (current)

Soothran (Malayalam: സൂത്രൻ) is the titular protagonist of the Indian comic series that appears regularly in the Malayalam children's magazine Balarama. The comics are conceptualized by Luis Fernandes (the editor of Tinkle) and N. M. Mohan, written by Madhavan Namboothiri and illustrated (currently) by Simi Muhamma.

The story revolves around a smart jackal named Soothran who lives in a cave in the jungle. His best friend, Sheru, is a dumb and cowardly tiger. The strips depict the adventures of the two friends, and is noted for its funny twist endings.

The comic strip, launched in mid-2001 (July), was a huge success. Unlike other comics in Malayalam, it became widely popular among Kerala youth also and soon became a flagship strip of the magazine. More than 500 weekly strips of Soothran have been published so far, each one about 4 or 5 pages in length.

"Soothran" was created by Luis Fernandes, the editor of the Tinkle magazine, and N. M. Mohan for Balarama in 2001. Simi Muhamma, an artist from Muhamma in Alleppey, currently draws the comics and Madhavan Namboothiri prepares the script.

== Characters ==
Sootran

Sootran (സൂത്രൻ)is the protagonist in the comic around him all the story revolves. Sootran is a fox of medium stature but cunning as well. He is accompanied by his friend Sheru. Sootran in most cases try to find solutions or to capitalise scenarios which evolve. In any case he (and his friend) end up hanging. Babysitting Kadiyan's son is a major predicament for the duo so that they take utmost care in protecting him and at the same time entertaining him.

Sheru

Sheru the tiger (ഷേരു കടുവ)is Sootran's best friend and there is no existence for Sheru without Sootran and vice versa. Sheru is a loyal (somewhat obedient) to Sootran and joins him in every venture. Sheru seems selfless, monotonic and innocent compared to Sootran. Sheru is of strong built but ends up bad as good as Sootran does. Some people may think he is dumb but he is overly innocent and talks very less.

Kadiyan

Kadiyan the lion (കടിയൻ സിംഹം)is an important character just like the above-mentioned pair. Kadiyan acts like a goon and does not hesitate to assault people if he decides to. Kadiyan is of the negative side despite the fact that he reasons with Sootran in many instances. Kadiyan employes Sootran to look after his son which shows how much he trusts them.

However they end up really bad as they fail to keep him safe. In most of the stories Kadiyan choke both of them for jeopardizing his son's safety.

Karinakkan

Karinakkan (കരിനാക്കൻ വവ്വാൽ ) is another character who is a bat. His speciality is that whatever he says happens immediately. Named after the malayalam word for "Jinx". He often brings misfortune in a black humor way to the main characters.

Ajagajan

Ajagajan (അജഗജൻ)the goat is a guest character who is not a regular but inseparable one in the storyline. Ajagajan is a scared goat who somehow got into the forest ( somehow he act like that) pray to god to keep him safe. He is a white goat with peculiar ornaments ( religiously sacred maybe). He utters verses all the time free styling the situation. He is good rapper as it appears, he effortlessly juggles rhymes and sophisticated terms with great eloquence. Many remember instances where Sootran and Sheru conspiring to eat the Goat.

Kaattumuthappan

Kaattumuthappan (കാട്ടുമുതപ്പൻ)is the god or a deity which is a character and is mentioned several hundred times by every animals in the story. When prayed to him,he will appear in the form of the species of the animal who called him. They pop a phrase " ente kaattumuthappa , chathicho?!" meaning " My god , have we screwed up!?"when they get into trouble. He is known to make the wish of the animals come true like a genie.

Moonga Vaidhyar

Moonga Vaidhyar (മൂങ്ങ വൈദ്യർ)is an owl who knows medicines and remedies. Animals in pain consult him in the stories. He is an often appearing character in the comics. In olden times, the first stories of Soothran, Moonga Vaidhyar used to sit on a hole in the tree. But the stories now feature him sitting on a branch.

Karinjunni

Karinjunni (കരിഞ്ഞുണ്ണി)is a black cat who is rarely seen in the comics. His first appearance dates back to the balarama issue of 17 June 2006. He is often portrayed as being the one who brings bad luck (based on the superstition of seeing a black cat).

== Trivia ==
- Soothran comics have also been published as special summer month collections, starting in 2003.
- Akku and Ikku is a spin-off story from the Soothran universe and appeared in "Balarama" magazine.
- Soothran and Sheru appear in a series of crossover comics known as All the Best.
- Many characters in the Soothran stories don't have a name. One such example is the yellow bird who brings news of Kadiyan the lion to Soothran.
- Moonga Vaidhyar the owl used to sit in a hole in the tree but now sits on a tree branch.
