= Vellinakshatram =

Vellinakshatram (lit. 'Friday Horrorscope') may refer to these in Indian media:

- Vellinakshatram (magazine), a film magazine published in Malayalam by the Kalakaumudi publications
- Vellinakshatram (1949 film), a Malayalam film produced under Udaya Studios
- Vellinakshatram (2004 film), a Malayalam horror film directed by Vinayan
