= Fort Kochi Graffiti =

Fort Kochi Graffiti is the Banksy-styled graffiti to protest against the Kochi-Muziris Biennale by an unknown artist in the street and walls in Fort Kochi. This satirical street art and subversive epigrams combine dark humour with graffiti executed in a stencilling technique. It is creating a flutter in social networking sites the world over.

Bob Marley, Jimi Hendrix and Michael Jackson as the Carnatic Trinity playing the Veena and the Tanpura; Colonel Sanders the founder of KFC(Kentucky Fried Chicken) flipping Kerala Parottas; Karl Marx and Frederick Engels meditating on tiger skin; Old Malayalam film actor Prem Nazir as James Bond; the lady in the famous painting Mona Lisa as a delicate pot bearing village belle; the cartoon characters in Mayavi.

== Sources ==
- Thomas, Edison (11 December 2014). "Banksy style graffiti was done to protest against the Biennale". The Times of India.
- Nidheesh, M K (8 December 2014). "Guess Who Says It". The New Indian Express. Archived from the original on 23 December 2014.
- "Amazing graffiti artwork surfaces in Kochi: Guess who is behind 'Guess Who'". Daily Bhaskar. 10 December 2014. Archived from the original on 13 December 2014.
