= R. Heli =

Indian farm journalist (1934–2020)

R. Hali
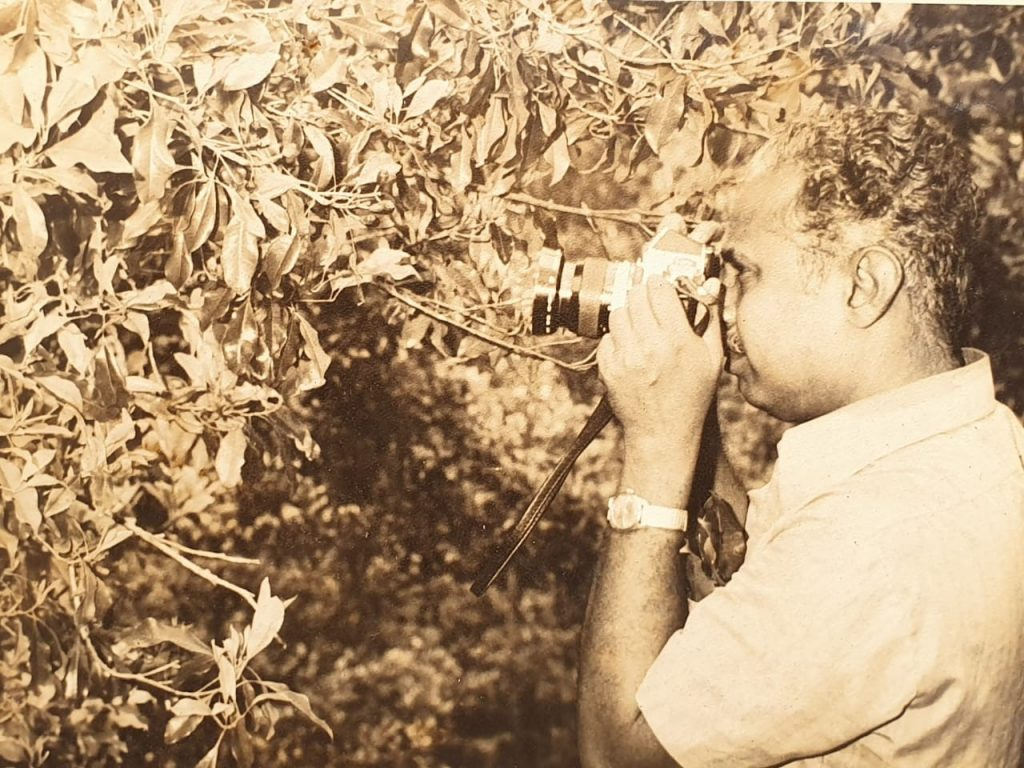
- Born: 1934
- Died: 13 December 2020; Alappuzha
- Education: University of Agricultural Sciences, Bangalore
- Occupations: Director of Agriculture, Kerala

R. Hali was a former director of agriculture of the state of Kerala and the first Principal Information Officer of the Farm Information Bureau (FIB) of Kerala. He was a pioneer of farm journalism in Kerala.

After completing his studies at the agriculture university in Bangalore, Hali started his career as an agriculture officer with the Rubber Board in 1955, before moving to the Agriculture Department of Thiru-Kochi in 1956 and, in 1957, the State Agriculture Department of Kerala. When the information services of the agriculture and animal husbandry departments of the state were combined to form the Farm Information Bureau (FIB) on 1 January 1969, Hali took over as its first Principal Information Officer. He served in that post until 1983. He retired as the director of the agriculture department in 1989.

Hali was instrumental in starting agriculture-related articles in Malayalam daily newspapers. He was among the early authors of articles in Karshikarangam, the column dedicated to agriculture in Mathrubhumi. He was also involved in promoting programs on agriculture in radio and television, including Vayalum Veedum in Akashavani (All India Radio) and Noorumeniyude Koithukar and Nattinpuram in Doordarshan. He was also the first full-time editor of Kerala Karshakan, a monthly farm magazine published by the Government of Kerala since 1954. He also authored a reference book on agriculture in Malayalam titled Krishipadam. His efforts helped in promoting the latest advancements in the field of agriculture among Kerala's farmers. He also played a role in opening Krishi Bhavans and popularising group farming in Kerala. He had also served as a consultant to the MS Swaminathan Research Foundation.

Even after retiring from his official role in the agriculture department Hali continued to be involved in the agriculture sector, writing extensively and communicating with the farming community. He also played the role of an advisor to State governments.

Hali was a recipient of the first Karshaka Bharathi Award for farm journalism and the Kerala Press Academy Award.

Hali was the son of P. M. Raman, the first municipal chairman of Attingal. He was also the brother of R. Prasannan, a former secretary of the Kerala Assembly and R. Prakasam, former MLA of Kerala.
