= Aside (disambiguation) =

An aside is a dramatic device in which a character speaks to the audience.

Aside may also refer to:

- Aside (magazine), a defunct Indian newsmagazine
- "Aside", a song by Shinee from Dream Girl – The Misconceptions of You
- "Aside", a song by The Weakerthans from Left and Leaving
- <aside>, an HTML5 element
- Aside (album), by South Korean singer Yoon Jisung

== See also ==
- "A-Side", a 1965 song by Roger Webb
- A-side and B-side
- Asides Besides, a 1998 compilation album by Talk Talk
