= Society (magazine) =

Indian magazine

- Deputy Editor: Sapna Sarfare
- Categories: Lifestyle, celebrity
- Frequency: Monthly
- First issue: 1971
- Company: Magna Publishing Co. Ltd.(The Hero Group)
- Country: India
- Based in: Mumbai
- Language: English
- Website: http://societymag.co.in/

Society is a monthly English-language lifestyle and celebrity magazine published in India. It was founded in 1971 by Nari Hira, and is published by Magna Publishing Co. Ltd. in Mumbai. As of 2018, it is edited by Sapna Sarfare.

Society describes itself as "India's leading people and lifestyle magazine," which "has always been the front runner in reporting about the lives of the rich and famous," and covering "the latest news, controversy or achievements of people in the area of business, politics, art, sports, media or spicy details on socialites."

In Pop Culture India!, author Asha Kasbekar describes Society as part of a new wave of 1970s lifestyle magazines, along with Debonair, Gentleman, Inside Outside, Interior, Savvy, and Women's Era.

The magazine also conducts awards to honour achievers in various fields including Society Achievers Award, Society Global Indian Icon Award and Society Pride of India Honour.
