= Saptahik Samaya =

Saptahik – Samaya
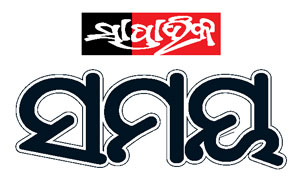

- Saptahik Cover 24 January 2016 front cover
- Editor: Patitapan Mohapatra
- Categories: Magazine
- Frequency: Weekly
- Founder: Basanta Biswal
- Founded: 1997
- Company: Ashirbad Prakashan Pvt. Ltd.
- Country: India
- Language: Odia
- Website: Official website

Saptahik Samaya (Odia:ସପ୍ତହିକ) is a weekly magazine in the Odia language published by Pradipta Kumar Lenka from Bhubaneswar, India.

== See also ==
- List of magazines in India
