= Abraham Eraly =

Indian writer (1934–2015)

- അബ്രഹാം എരളി
- Abraham Eraly
- Born: 15 August 1934; Ayyampalli, Kerala, British Raj
- Died: 8 April 2015 (aged 80); Pondicherry, Puducherry (union territory), India
- Education: Madras Christian College
- Spouse: Sita Eraly
- Children: Satish Eraly
- Writing career
- Genres: History, Fiction
- Subject: Indian history
- Notable work: The Mughal Throne: The Saga of India's Great Emperors
- Website: Penguin India

Abraham Eraly (15 August 1934 – 8 April 2015) was an Indian writer of history, a teacher, and the founder of Chennai-based magazine Aside.

== Early life ==
Abraham Eraly was born in the village of Ayyampalli in Ernakulam district, Kerala on 15 August 1934. He studied history at a college in Ernakulam and followed it up with a postgraduate degree in the same subject at Madras Christian College in Chennai. He became a professor of history at MCC in 1971.

Bored with the monotony of teaching, Eraly resigned his professorship in 1977 and founded the Chennai-based magazine Aside, India's first English-language city magazine.

== Aside ==
In 1977, Abraham Eraly founded Aside, a magazine devoted to Madras and its cultural life. It featured writing on politics, culture, cinema, society, dance, theatre and music. The magazine also published articles by S. Muthiah.

In 1986, Aside became a fortnightly news magazine. It ceased publication in 1997 citing financial difficulties.

== Literary career ==
Eraly's earliest publications were poems and short stories.

Abraham Eraly in an interview with journalist and author, talks to Shreekumar Varma says:

History is about life. You can't invent even the minutest fact, but there is scope for visualising what had happened.

His historical writing career started while at Madras Christian College. Dissatisfied with the material he used to teach history, he began to write a series of books on Indian history. The Gem in the Lotus covered its earliest period, while The Last Spring continued the narration to the end of the Mughal Empire. Eraly's style of historical story-telling made him particularly approachable for non-historians but could also be used as a reliable source on the Mughal period in India.

== Later life ==
In 2011, Eraly moved to Pondicherry, where he lived in Sarathambal Nagar.

Abraham Eraly died at the JIPMER hospital on 8 April 2015, following a paralytic attack.

== Bibliography ==
=== Non-fiction ===
- The Age of Wrath: A History of the Delhi Sultanate, 2014, Penguin UK, ISBN 935118658X
- The First Spring: The Golden Age of India, 2011, Penguin Books India, ISBN 0670084786
- Gem In The Lotus: The Seeding Of Indian Civilisation, 2002, Penguin UK, ISBN 935118014X
- The Last Spring: The Lives and Times of Great Mughals, 2000, Penguin UK, ISBN 9351181286
  - The Mughal Throne: The Saga of India's Great Emperors, 2004, Phoenix ISBN 9780753817582
  - The Mughal world : life in India's last golden age, 2007, Penguin Books, ISBN 9780143102625

Many of his books were divided and re-published under different names leading to multiple titles. The Last Spring: The Lives and Times of Great Mughals was re-published in two parts: The Last Spring Part I (alternatively known as The Mughal Throne and Emperors Of The Peacock Throne) and The Last Spring Part II (alternatively known as The Mughal World).

=== Fiction ===
- Night of the Dark Tree: A Novel, 2006, Penguin Books India, ISBN 0143061836
- Tales Once Told: Legends of Kerala, 2006, Penguin Books India, ISBN 014309968X
