= K. L. Mohana Varma =

Indian writer (born 1936)

K.L. Mohanavarma
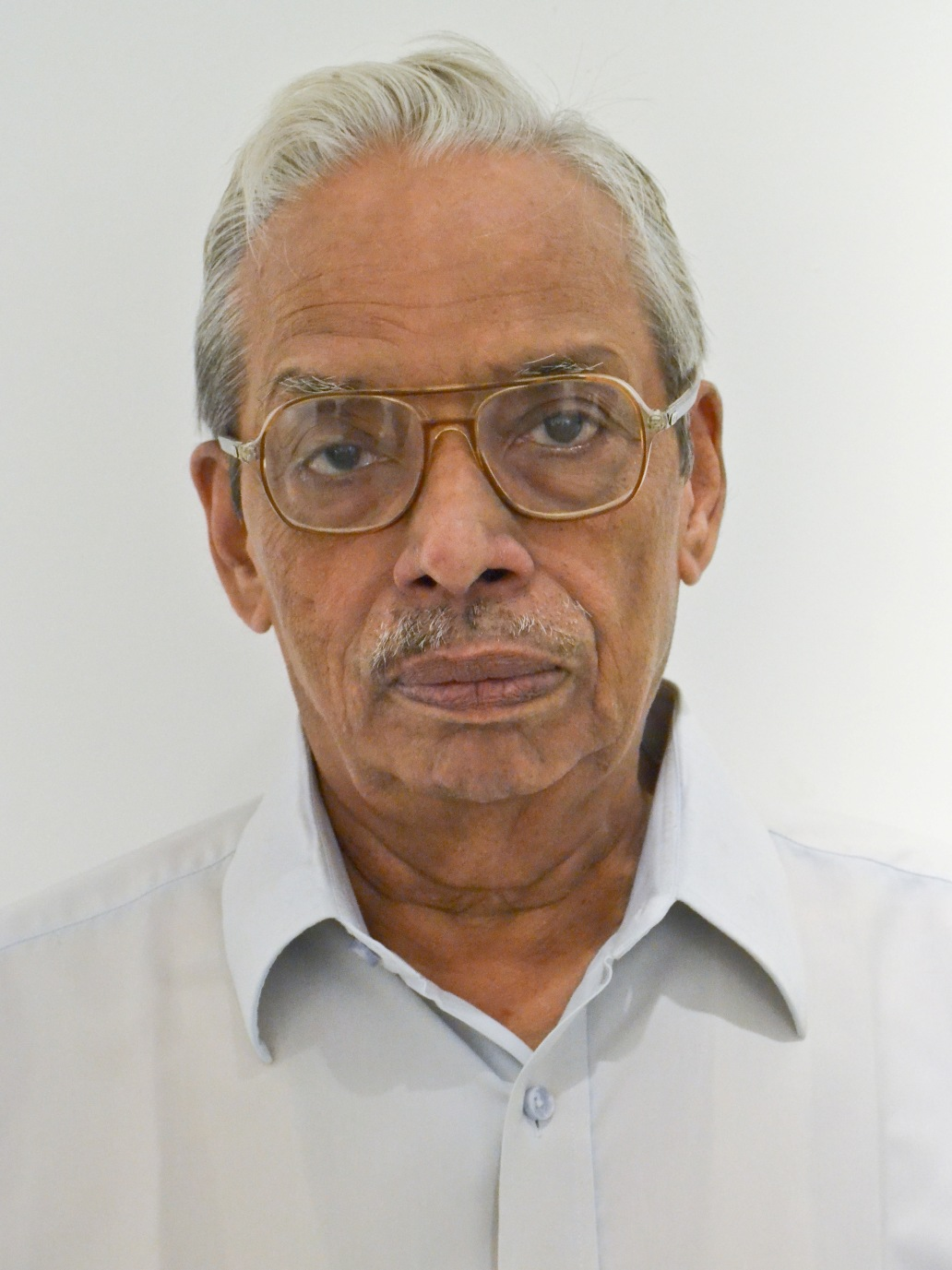
- Born: 8 July 1936 (age 90); Cherthala, Alappuzha District, Kerala State, India
- Occupations: Novelist, short story writer
- Spouse: Radha Varma
- Children: 2
- Writing career
- Language: Malayalam, English
- Genres: Novel, short story, children's literature, travelogue, essays
- Subjects: Sports, history
- Notable works: Cricket, Ohari, Neethi
- Notable awards: Sahitya Akademi Award, Kerala Sahitya Akademi Award
- Movement: Realism

K. L. Mohana Varma (born 1936) is a Malayalam–language novelist, short story writer and journalist from the Indian state of Kerala. Varma is known for pioneering fiction with a subject-based theme in Malayalam story-telling. His novels Ohari, Cricket, Neethi, reflect this form. His humorous columns and articles on contemporary politics, business and sports are popular. He has 66 published works, including 2 novels in English. His books are translated into many Indian languages. He has more than 15 awards for his works. He made two documentaries and a children's film.

== Early life ==
He holds an Accounts and Management degree.

== Career ==
Varma was Chief Editor of Paico publications, Secretary of Kerala Sahitya Academy, and Chief Editor of Veekshanam Daily and Puzha.com, which is Malayalam's top internet magazine. He has lectured in many places, including American universities. He regularly visits Indian villages to maintain his sensitivity to the lives of his subjects.

Varma is President of Kerala History Association and President of Kerala Sahityas Mandalam and ex officio member of government committees on official language and Malayalam mission.

Varma is a frequent speaker at cultural events.

== Bibliography ==
=== Novels ===
- Rithusandhi
- Aaranya parvam
- Yavanika
- Serial
- V Cube
- Shapam
- Chambal
- Jalarekhakal
- Pretham
- Innaleyude Bakki
- Ohari
- Vrindavanathile Radha
- Neethi
- Nakshatrangalude Thadavukaari
- Short Circuit
- Cinema Cinema
- Mahabaliyude Makkal
- Private Limited
- Chathurangam
- Ayaanayam
- Stock Exchange
- Cricket
- Santhvanam
- Thrippadi Danam
- Sukham
- Parppidam
- Adhinivesham
- Settlement
- Kochi
- Goal
- Amaavasi (With Madavikkutty)
- Abhinayam
- Rajasooyam

=== Fiction ===
- From Basthar With Love
- Nee
- Mochanam
- Pratheeksha
- Nammal Pathikar
- Yours Obediently
- Appointmmentillatha Athithi
- Gulf Kathakal
- Akaleyulla Koodarangal
- Rosemary
- Penguin
- Mohanavarmayude Sthreekal
- Kaayiyude Noottand
- Vazhiyorakkazhchakal
- Bharthruhariyude Kuthirakkaran

=== Satire ===
- Professorude Lokam
- Anaswrathayude Gatha
- Kariyachante Lokam
- Acadameeyam
- From Varmaji With Love

=== Travelogue ===
- Budhan Piranna Mannil
- Cherippum Ahanthayum
- Professor in America

=== Children's Literature ===
- Chasharasaha Mira

=== Others ===
- Mobi Dick (Fantacy)
- Nikkiyum Computer Virusum
- Thinkalkkuri
