= Kerala Karshakan =

Kerala Karshakan is a monthly farm magazine published by Government of Kerala undertaking Farm Information Bureau (FIB). Launched in 1954, it is the second oldest farm magazine in India after Indian Farming, published by ICAR. R. Heli was its first full-time editor.

In June 2013, FIB launched an e-journal version of Kerala Karshakan.

== See also ==
- List of Malayalam-language periodicals
