= N. M. Mohan =

Indian comics writer, editor

- Born: 31 October 1949
- Died: 12 December 2012 (aged 63)
- Areas: Comics writer Comic magazine designer
- Notable works: Mayavi; Luttappi
- Collaborators: Pradeep Sathe; M. Mohandas

N.M. Mohan (1949–2012) was an Indian comics writer, editor, magazine and advertisement designer, visualiser and architectural consultant. He is one of the pioneers of comic magazine publication in Malayalam and creator of a number of popular comics characters in Kerala. He served as the editor of the Malayalam comics Poompatta and Balarama.

In collaboration with several artists and comics creators, most notably Pradeep Sathe, he prepared Mayavi, Luttappi and many other fictional characters, introducing simple, naturalistic themes and played a major role in rise of both Poompatta and Balarama comics.

Mohan was born to N.G. Bhaskaran Nair, a businessman from Pala, in 1949. He studied at St. Thomas College, Pala and NSS College, Changanassery. He was married to Latha, daughter of Vaikom Chandrasekharan Nair. He lived at Palamundakkal House, Cherunarakam Road, Nattasserry, Kottayam.

Mohan started his career in the general interest magazine Chithrakarthika (published from Trivandrum by Vaikom Chandrasekharan Nair). He later shifted to Poompatta, one of the pioneering comic magazines in Malayalam, and served as the Editor-in-Charge of Balarama from 1983 to 2012. He played major role in the publication of several of its sister publications such as Balarama Digest, Malayalam Amar Chitra Katha, Magic Pot and Tell Me Why.

Mohan died on 12 December 2012 following a heart attack.
