= Cherukad =

Indian writer and activist

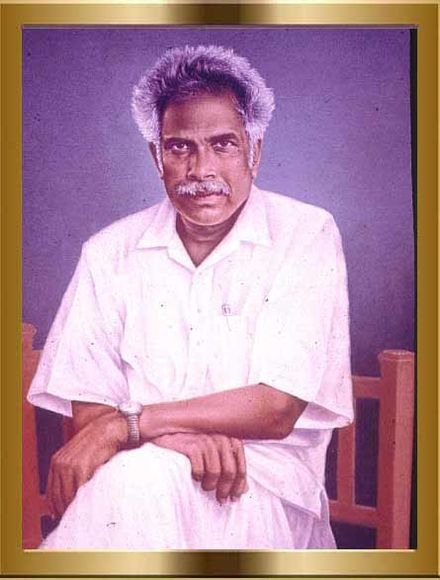
- Born: Cherukad Govinda Pisharodi; 26 August 1914; Chemmalasseri, Perinthalmanna, Madras State, British India
- Died: 28 October 1976 (aged 62)
- Occupations: Writer, political activist, teacher
- Writing career
- Language: Malayalam
- Genres: Play, novel, short story, poetry, essay, autobiography
- Notable works: Jeevithappatha, Muthassi, Manninte Maaril
- Notable awards: Sahitya Akademi Award, Kerala Sahitya Akademi Award
- Movement: Progressive literature

Cherukad Govinda Pisharodi (26 August 1914 – 28 October 1976), commonly known as Cherukad, was a Malayalam-language playwright, novelist, poet and political activist, associated with the Communist movement in Kerala state, India.

== Biography ==
Cherukad was born in Chemmalasseri in Perinthalmanna taluk to Kizheettil Pisharath Karunakara Pisharody and Cherukad Pisharath Narayani Pisharasiar. He got elementary training in Sanskrit from Guru Gopalanezhuthachan. After completing high school education, he joined Chemmala Aided Mappila School as a teacher. He passed Vidvan Examination from Madras and worked in many schools as teacher before joining Pattambi Sanskrit College as a lecturer.

In 1936, Cherukad married Kizheettil Pisharath Lakshmi Pisharasiar. Their son K. P. Mohanan is a noted writer.

Cherukad's politically charged writing was influential in defining the Malayalam literature of the 1950s and 1960s. His political life was connected with the lives of the leading politicians and patriots of Kerala. Cherukad was one of the founding members of the Deshabhimani Study Circle, a progressive literary movement in Kerala and the predecessor of the Purogamana Kala Sahitya Sangham. Some of his important works are Jeevithappatha, Tharavaditham, Manushyabandhangal, Namal Onnu, Manushya Hridayangal, Janmabhumi, Devalokam, Manninte Maril (On the Bosom of the Soil), Muthassi and Sanidasa. His autobiography Jeevithappatha (1974) received the Kerala Sahitya Akademi Award in 1975 and Kendra Sahitya Akademi Award in 1977.

Cherukad died on 28 October 1976. The Cherukad Award is an annual literary award given in his memory.

== Bibliography ==
=== Novel ===
- Manninte Maaril (Calicut: Prabhatham, 1954)
- Muthassi (Calicut: Kairali Sahakarana Sangham, 1959) Read online
- Sanidasa (Calicut: P. K. Brothers, 1959) Read online
- Pramani (Trichur: Current, 1962)
- Marumakal (Cochin: CICC, 1963)
- Muthassi: Part II (Trichur: Current, 1964)
- Devalokam (Trichur: Current, 1971)
- Bhooprabhu (Trivandrum: Sakthi, 1976)
- Maranapathram (Trivandrum: Chintha, 1977)

=== Play ===
- Snehabandhangal (Quilon: Prabhatham, 1954, 2nd edition)
- Tharavaditham (Trichur: Mangalodayam, 1954)
- Swathanthra (Calicut: P. K. Brothers, 1955)
- Manushyahridayangal (Trichur: Current, 1955)
- Rakteswari (Calicut: P. K. Brothers, 1956)
- Visuddha Nuna (Trichur: Current, 1956)
- Odukkathe Onam (Calicut: P. K. Brothers, 1956)
- Janmabhumi (Calicut: P. K. Brothers, 1958)
- Mulankoottam (Trichur: Current, 1958)
- Anakkettu (Calicut: P. K. Brothers, 1958)
- Kutti Thampuran (Trichur: Current, 1958)
- Kutti Thampuratti (Calicut: P. K. Brothers)
- Vaalnakshatram (Calicut: P. K. Brothers, 1960)
- Chittu Vilakku (Trichur: Current, 1960)
- Kodumkaattu (Palghat: Udaya, 1966)
- Nammalonnu (Trichur: Current, 1969, Revised edition)
- Adima (Calicut: P. K. Brothers, 1969, 2nd edition)
- Doctor Kachan (Palghat: Udaya, 1970)

=== Poetry ===
- Aradhana (Palghat: Vellinezhi, 1945)
- Thiramala (Palghat: Vellinezhi, 1945)
- Anthappuram (Trichur: Mangalodayam, 1945)
- Methaapp (Trichur: Mangalodayam, 1954)
- Manushyane Maanikkuka (Calicut: P. K. Brothers, 1961)

=== Short story ===
- Jeevikkan (Calicut: P. M. Mohammed, 1954)
- Mudra Motiram (Calicut: Prabhatham, 1954)
- Cherukadinte Cherukathakal (Trichur: Current, 1954)
- Theruvinte Kutti (Calicut: P. K. Brothers, 1956)
- Chekkuthante Koodu (Trichur: Current, 1958)
- Chuttan Moori (Calicut: P. K. Brothers, 1962)

=== Children's literature ===
- Karuppan Kutty (Trivandrum: Balan, 1962, 2nd edition)
- Oru Divasam (Trichur: Current, 1960)
- Thanthra Kurukkan (Trichur: Kerala Sahitya Akademi, 1968)

=== Autobiography ===
- Jeevithappatha (Pattambi: Sakthi, 1974)

=== Miscellaneous ===
- Menonte Meni (Ottappalam: published by the author, 1945) (Ottan Thullal)
- Society President (Calicut: Deshabhimani, 1946) (Ottan Thullal)
- Vella Chantha (Calicut: Marxist Books, 1952) (Ottan Thullal)
- Onam Varunnu (Cochin: Prabhatham, 1955) (Onam songs)
