= Vayalum Veedum =

Indian-Malayalam language radio programme

- Genre: Farming techniques and related programmes
- Running time: Daily: 18:50–19:20 (20 minutes)
- Country of origin: India
- Language: Malayalam
- Home station: All India Radio
- Hosted by: Muraleedharan Thazhakkara
- Created by: R. Heli
- Written by: Several
- Produced by: Muraleedharan Thazhakkara
- Narrated by: Muraleedharan Thazhakkara
- Recording studio: All India Radio, Kerala
- Original release: 11 August 1966
- No. of episodes: 18000+

Vayalum Veedum (transl. Farm and Home) is an Indian-Malayalam language evening radio programme. It is broadcast daily on All India Radio from 18:50 to 19:20. Established in 1966, it is one of the longest-running radio show broadcast from All India Radio with more than 18000 episodes and remains one of the most popular in Kerala. The programme is about the agriculture and rural development, which was begun under the ‘Grow more food’ campaign launched by the central government.

== History ==
When the central government's 'Grow more food' campaign to promote the efficient agricultural techniques became a failure, they began thinking about some new methods to spread awareness of farming techniques and efficient food production in rural areas of the country. As a part of this, it was decided to broadcast agricultural related programmes on All India Radio. Thrissur station was among the 10 stations initially selected for this and the first episode of Vayalum Veedum was broadcast on 11 August 1966. The Kozhikode station began broadcast of the programme in 1972 followed by the Thiruvananthapuram station in 1986. During its early years, Vayalum Veedum was run by officials on deputation from the Agriculture Department under the designation, 'Radio farm officers'. The programme has the history of its script being written by some notable writers including Kovilan, Akkitham, Madampu Kunjukuttan, S. Ramesan Nair, P.P. Sreedharanunni and N.N. Kakkad. Also, filmmaker P. Padmarajan and his wife Radha Lekshmi had served as the announcers of the programme.

== Popularity and influence ==
Vayalum Veedum is one of the most popular programme among the radio listeners in Kerala. "Vayalum Veedum is still a hit. It started at a time when radio was the most powerful media and the programmes had great impact on farmers. Not just farmers, the general public also continue to be enthusiastic listeners of the programme"; said Muraleedharan Thazhakkara, a long-time programme executive of Vayalum Veedum on its 50th anniversary. Vayalum Veedum completed its 50th anniversary in 2016 and year-long celebrations were conducted by All India Radio. A state level quiz competition for the farmers was organised as a part along with different interactive sessions between farmers and experts in agricultural sector. Notable voice recordings from these sessions were also broadcast.
