= New India Samachar =

- Editor: Dhirendra Ojha (Edito-in-chief)
- Frequency: Fortnightly
- Format: Online
- Publisher: Satyendra Prakash
- Founded: 2020
- First issue: August 15, 2020; 6 years ago
- Company: Bureau of Outreach and Communication; Press Information Bureau; Ministry of Information and Broadcasting
- Country: India
- Language: 13 languages (English, Hindi, Gujarati, Marathi, Tamil, Kannada, Urdu, Malayalam, Telugu, Bengali, Assamese, Punjabi, Odia)
- Website: newindiasamachar.pib.gov.in

New India Samachar is a fortnightly magazine in India launched by the Government of India on August 15, 2020. It is published by the Bureau of Outreach and Communication (BOC), a media unit operating under the Ministry of Information and Broadcasting.

The e-magazine's primary objective is to disseminate information about the Indian government's flagship schemes, initiatives, cabinet decisions, Mann Ki Baat broadcasts and current affairs. It is published in English and 12 other Indian languages, including Hindi, Gujarati, Marathi, Tamil, Kannada, Urdu, Malayalam, Telugu, Bengali, Assamese, Punjabi and Odia. The magazine is distributed at no cost to various recipients, such as media outlets, educational institutions, and panchayats.

== Controversies and reception ==
The magazine has received criticism for its factual inaccuracy. The January 2022 issue of New India Samachar, which commemorated India's 75th year of Independence during the Azadi Ka Amrit Mahotsav, came under criticism for factual inaccuracies. The magazine featured content suggesting that Swami Vivekananda's teachings were a precursor to the 1857 revolt, even though Vivekananda was not born during that period. These chronological inconsistencies were questioned by the All India Trinamool Congress, leading to doubts about the accuracy of the published information. As the magazine's publisher, the Press Information Bureau also faced criticism from various sources, including critics, historians, politicians and political parties. Later, the government rectified the error in the English version of New India Samachar.
