= HT Media =

Indian mass media company

HT Media Limited
- Type: Public
- Traded as: BSE: 532662, NSE: HTMEDIA
- Industry: Mass media
- Founded: 2002; 24 years ago
- Headquarters: Delhi, India
- Key people: Shobhana Bhartia (Chairperson)
- Products: Publishing; web portals
- Revenue: ▼₹2,330 crore (US$240 million) (2020)
- Operating income: ▼₹−67 crore (US$−7.0 million) (2020)
- Net income: ▼₹−214 crore (US$−22 million) (2020)
- Number of employees: 1,891 (2020)
- Website: www.htmedia.in

HT Media Limited is an Indian mass media company based in Delhi. It has holdings in print, electronic and digital media. HT Media's flagship newspaper is the Hindustan Times, the second most widely read English newspaper in India after The Times of India. It also publishes Mint, an Indian financial daily newspaper. Other publications include the Hindi-language daily Hindustan, the Hindi-language literary magazine Kadambini, and Hindi-language children's magazine Nandan. It operates 19 printing facilities across India with an installed capacity of 1.5 million copies per hour.

HT's online business, is largely handled by Firefly e-ventures internet business, include the flagship web portal Hindustantimes.com, Livemint.com, Desimartini.com, HTCampus.com and Shine.com.

Although a public company listed on both the BSE and NSE, HT Media Ltd. is majority owned and controlled by the KK Birla family, with Shobhana Bhartia, daughter of K. K. Birla, its chairperson.

== History ==
Hindustan Times was founded in 1924, and formally established as a limited liability company in 1927. In 1936, the Hindi daily Hindustan was launched.

It also publishes two magazines in Hindi, Kadambini, a literary magazine established in 1960, and Nandan, a children's magazine, started in 1964.

In 2002, the company incorporated all of its media businesses under HT Media Ltd. In 2004, HT Media Ltd was listed as a public company and attracted external funding. In 2006, Fever 104 FM was launched, in technical collaboration with the Virgin Group. Hindustan was relaunched re-establishing the company's prominent presence in the regional news space. In 2007, Mint, the business paper in partnership with the Wall Street Journal, was launched in Delhi and Mumbai. In the internet space, Hindustantimes.com was relaunched and Livemint.com was introduced. To further expand its digital presence, HTCampus.com was launched in June 2010 to provide information on colleges, courses, exams and careers for higher education in India.

HT Media acquired Radio One (India) in 2019, and VCCircle from News Corp in 2020.

== Digital businesses ==
- HT Mobile - which in turn acquired digital marketing agency Webitude
- Firefly e-Ventures - which moved to the parent company and launched its job portal, Shine.com
- Desimartini - film news website, acquired by HT Media in 2007
- OTTplay - content discovery platform offering curated shows and movies on streaming platforms
- Shine.com - an online job portal of HT Media which is operational in India; the second largest job portal website in India.
- Shine Learning - an online learning portal of HT Media which provides online courses, certification exams, and practice tests related to various fields like online marketing, banking, finance, and web development
- Hindustan Times Telugu - a Telugu news website of HT Media. This website provides news updates and analytical articles on politics, sports, entertainment, business, automobiles, technology, and many other topics. It is one of the fastest-growing news websites in Andhra Pradesh and Telangana.
