= Film Magazine (magazine) =

Former film weekly news magazine published in Malayalam language from Kerala, India

- Cover of Film Magazine dated 30 July 1989 rated Rs.2.50
- Frequency: Weekly
- Company: Kalakaumudi
- Country: India
- Based in: Thiruvananthapuram, Kerala
- Language: Malayalam

Film Magazine was a film weekly news magazine published in Malayalam language from Kerala, India. It was printed at Thiruvananthapuram and distributed throughout Kerala by Kalakaumudi Publications Private Limited. Although the magazine had connections to Kerala Kaumudi newspaper, it was an independent company. It highlighted the doings and happenings of the Mollywood film scene. It was one of the most popular entertainment magazine in Malayalam, but Kalakaumudi discontinued it and launched Vellinakshatram.
