= Bureau of Outreach and Communication =

India Advertisement Bureau

Central Bureau of Communication (erstwhile Bureau of Outreach Communication)
- Logo of CBC

Agency overview
- Formed: 8 December 2017
- Headquarters: Soochna Bhawan, New Delhi
- Website: cbcindia.gov.in davp.nic.in

The Central Bureau of Communication erstwhile Bureau of Outreach and Communication (BOC), formed from the merger of Directorate of Advertising and Visual Publicity (DAVP) with two other departments, is the nodal agency of the Government of India for advertising by various Ministries and organisations of Government of India, including public sector undertakings and autonomous bodies.

== Formation ==
The Ministry of Information and Broadcasting has integrated its three departments, Directorate of Field Publicity (DFP), Song and Drama Division (S&DD) and Directorate of Advertising and Visual Publicity (DAVP) and re-named it as Bureau of Outreach and Communication. A committee comprising an additional secretary, the DG (DAVP) and a joint sectary has been formed to oversee the process of integration within a period of six months. Later, it was renamed as Central Bureau of Communication.

== Functioning ==
The integrated Media Bureau of Outreach and Communication would be headed by a Director General rank officer. An Additional Director General rank officer from ICAS would assist him in financial matters. Bureau of Outreach and Communication would help in creating an integrated communication strategy in coordination with Press Information Bureau(PIB). It will act as an advisory body for the Ministries on their media campaign. At the regional level, the media units are integrated into Regional Outreach Bureau (ROB) with an Additional Director General level officer as the Head of the Department for Regional Outreach Bureau. There will be only one common office for all three media units at the Region. A Senior Accounts Officer of ICAS would assist the Additional Director General in financial matters.

== Head of the Bureau ==
Indian Information Service (IIS) officer Ghanshyam Goyal was appointed as the head of Bureau of Outreach Communication (BOC), an entity formed by merging of DFP, S&DD and DAVP.
