= Nana (magazine) =

Malayalam-language film magazine

- February 1982
- Frequency: Weekly
- Founded: 1972
- Company: Kerala Sabdam
- Country: India
- Based in: Kollam
- Language: Malayalam
- Website: https://nanaonline.in/

Nana is an Indian Malayalam-language film magazine published weekly by Kerala Sabdam publications. The magazine began publication in 1972 by R. Krishnaswamy Reddiar. It is headquartered in Kollam, Kerala. It is one of the largest Malayalam-language magazines in India by circulation.
