= Chalachithram =

- Cover of Chalachithram rated Rs.5.00
- Categories: Film
- Frequency: Weekly
- Publisher: Manorajyam
- Final issue: late 1980s
- Country: India
- Based in: Thiruvananthapuram, Kerala
- Language: Malayalam

Chalachithram was a weekly film magazine published in Malayalam language from Kerala, India. The publisher was Manorajyam. M.M. Balachandran served as the editor of the magazine. It was printed at Thiruvananthapuram and distributed throughout Kerala. It was one of the most popular film magazines of 1980's in Kerala. It highlighted the doings and happenings of the Mollywood film scene as well as update from Tamil and Hindi industry. But the publishers discontinued the printing in late 1980s.
