= Chandrika (newspaper) =

Indian newspaper founded in the 1932

- Type: Daily newspaper
- Format: Broadsheet
- Owner(s): Muslim Printing and Publishing Company
- Founders: A. K. Kunjumayin Haji; Sattar Sait; K. M. Seethi Sahib
- Publisher: P. K. K. Bava
- Editor: Kamal Varadur
- Founded: 1932; 94 years ago, Tellicherry (Malabar District)
- Political alignment: Centre-right
- Language: Malayalam
- Headquarters: Tellicherry (1932 - 1946); Kozhikode (from 1946)
- Country: India
- Website: chandrikadaily.com
- Free online archives: epaper.chandrikadaily.com

Chandrika (lit. 'The Crescent') is an Indian daily newspaper in Malayalam language published from Kozhikode, Kerala. The newspaper currently serves as the mouthpiece of Indian Union Muslim League party in Kerala.

The Chandrika started publishing from Tellicherry (1932) as a monthly platform for north Kerala Muslim community uplift and with a 'reformist' orientation. Its establishment was led by leading local Muslims such as A. K. Kunjumayin Haji, Sattar Sait and K. M. Seethi Sahib. K. K. Muhammad Shafi and C. P. Mammu Keyi were first editor and managing editor of the publication respectively. It became a daily newspaper in 1939. The daily played a significant role in the development of the Muslim community of north Kerala. It moved its headquarters to Calicut in 1946.

C. H. Muhammed Koya, the future Education Minister of Kerala and the 8th Chief Minister of Kerala (October to December 1979), served as a sub-editor and the editor of Chandrika in the 1940s. Former Union Minister E. Ahamed was once the reporter of the daily and later served on its board of directors. The daily currently represents 'traditionalist' orientation among the Kerala Muslims.

The daily currently has printing centres in Kozhikode, Kannur, Malappuram, Kochi, Thiruvananthapuram, and Kottayam, and in United Arab Emirates (Dubai), Saudi Arabia (Riyadh, Jeddah, and Dammam), Bahrain, and Qatar (Doha).

== See also ==
- List of Malayalam-language newspapers
- List of Malayalam-language periodicals
- List of newspapers in India
