= Kashful Akhbar =

Indian Urdu magazine

- Categories: cultural
- Publisher: Munshi Mohammad Aman Ali
- Founded: 1855
- First issue: 1855
- Country: India
- Language: Urdu

Kashful Akhbar is an India Urdu magazine, it was established in 1855 and first published in 1874, The magazine was published in Mumbai and played a role in the literary and cultural landscape of the time. Its publisher was Munshi Mohammad Aman Ali, a figure in Urdu literature. The magazine covered a variety of topics and was known for its literary contributions, including poetry and prose.

== History ==
Kashful Akhbar was the first Urdu newspaper in Bombay. It was established in 1855. Till 1960 there were several copies of this newspaper at Kutub Khana Mohammediya Jama Masjid and Karimi Library.
