= Madhu Muskan =

Indian comic magazine

- Frequency: Weekly
- Format: Print
- Circulation: ~100,000 (late 1970s)
- Publisher: Gowarsons Group of Companies
- Founded: 1972
- Final issue: 2004
- Country: India
- Based in: New Delhi
- Language: Hindi

Madhu Muskan (Sweet Smiles) was an Indian weekly comic magazine published by the Gowarsons Group of Companies from 1972 to 2004. Its circulation reached approximately 100,000 copies during the late 1970s.

== Overview ==
Gowarsons began publishing Madhu Muskan in New Delhi in 1972. The magazine was initially issued fortnightly and later became a weekly publication.

While not a comic book in the strict sense, Madhu Muskan consisted primarily of illustrated comic stories, which accounted for about 90 percent of its content and featured popular characters of the period. Four to five pages carried magazine-style material, with the remainder devoted to comics.

The Gowarsons Group also held the Indian rights to Archie, Asterix and several other titles. Madhu Muskan ceased publication in 2004, following financial difficulties in the Indian comic industry.

== Characters ==
Madhu Muskan's characters are primarily humorous. Characters during the 1970s and 1980s include:

- Daddy Ji, the main character, who appeared for almost 25 years and appeared on the cover of each issue. Daddy Ji's creator, Harish M. Sudan, modelled the character on his family and his brother-in-law.
- Babloo, a young detective appearing in every issue and whose uncle is the superintendent of police.
- Popat-Chaupat, a hapless comic duo beset with money problems.
- Sustram-Chustram, another comic duo with many problems. Chustram is overly energetic, and Sustram is extremely lazy.
- Bhootnath Aur Jaadui Tulika, a popular ghost with a magical paintbrush called Tulika.
- Minni, a clever, mischievous and helpful little girl.
- Dakoo Paan Singh, a fun- and danger-loving character who developed super-human strength when he chewed paan quickly whipped up by Supari Lal, his side-kick. His enemies included Madam Motallo, a fat woman who became a bouncing ball and flattened everything she bounced on; Serpa Soongh, a snake charmer; Cheenku, who could knock things down by sneezing; and Jadugar Jhundu, an evil magician. Their author was Murli Sundram.
- Filmi Reporter Kalamdas, a reporter who interviewed Bollywood stars; actual movie stars had comic names.
