= Raknno =

Konkani weekly magazine

- Editor: Rev Fr Valerian Fernandes
- Categories: News
- Frequency: Weekly
- Publisher: Deepti trust
- Founded: 1938
- Country: India
- Based in: Mangalore
- Language: Konkani
- Website: raknno.com

Raknno is a Konkani weekly magazine published in Kannada script from the Indian city of Mangalore. It is the largest circulated periodical in Konkani in Kannada script. It is edited by Rev Fr Valerian Fernandes.

== History and profile ==
The magazine was started in 1938, by Rev. Sylvester Menezes, under the encouragement of Rt. Rev. Victor Fernandes, Bishop of Mangalore. It has since grown and as emerged as the mouthpiece of the Konkani Catholics of the Canara Region.
