= Puzha Magazine =

Malayalam-language online magazine

- Puzha Print Magazine First Issue
- Editor: K. L. Mohana Varma Chandrashekaran Kartha
- Categories: Art, culture, interviews, literature
- Frequency: Now Online only
- Founded: 2000
- Company: Puzha.com
- Country: India
- Based in: Aluva
- Language: Malayalam
- Website: www.puzha.com

Puzha.com is the first Malayalam online magazine, founded in 2000, by Thomas Theakanath, Jeo Kurian, Harish Pillai, Shaji Thomas and KS James, that features original short-fiction,, poetry, reviews, interviews and columns and it has since become the leading outlet for emerging writers in Malayalam language. Puzha.com is also credited with making little magazines across Kerala available to a wider audience and archiving of local (traditional and to some extent tribal) knowledge base and folklore of Kerala. In 2007, Puzha.com received the prestigious Manthan Award for its dedication to the advancement of Malayalam literature, development of language tools and archiving and preservation of local knowledge base and folklore of Kerala.

== Overview ==
Since its inception, Puzha.com provided a publishing platform for emerging Malayalam writers. The original works of short-fiction, novels, poetry, reviews and other articles were sourced and edited at the Aluva office and published on a daily basis. However, a lot of leading Malayalam writers also regularly contribute the Magazine.

=== Notable contributors ===
- M. T. Vasudevan Nair
- Sethu
- Chemmanam Chacko
- Kureepuzha Sreekumar
- K. L. Mohana Varma
- U. K. Kumaran
- D. Vinayachandran
- M. N. Vijayan
- Anand
- A. Ayyappan
- Akbar Kakkattil
- Madhusoodhanan Nair

== Awards and citations ==
Puzha.com was awarded the prestigious Manthan South Asia prize. Citation
