= Saras Salil =

Hindi-language magazine of India

- Categories: Politics, Society and Entertainment
- Frequency: Fortnightly
- Founded: 1993
- Company: Delhi Press Patra Prakashan
- Country: India
- Based in: Delhi
- Language: Gujarati, Hindi, Malayalam, Telugu and Tamil
- Website: www.sarassalil.in

Saras Salil is an Indian fortnightly magazine in Hindi language. The magazine was established in 1993. It is published by Delhi Press Patra Prakashan and target audience are Indian women. It contains a mix of commentaries on social and political issues, and articles on society, sex, fiction and entertainment.

Saras Salil is published in five languages (including Hindi) and Hindi magazine is at no. 5 in IRS 2012, Q1 in India with an AIR 16 lakh. It had a highest readership according to IRS 2009 R1 in India in Hindi magazines. Saras Salil is placed second in the all magazines chart. The magazine has registered an AIR of 2,544,000 as compared to 3,008,000 in 2008 R2.
