= Poompatta =

Indian children's magazine

- Categories: Children's Magazine; Comic Magazine
- Frequency: Biweekly
- Founded: 1964
- Final issue: 2008
- Country: India
- Based in: Kerala
- Language: Malayalam

Poompatta (Malayalam: പൂമ്പാറ്റ; transl. Butterfly) was a Malayalam children's magazine which started publishing in 1964. It was initially published by P. A. Warrier and later by Sithara Publications, Pai and Company (PAICO), Manorajyam Publications and Suryaprabha Publications. Poompatta under PAICO was the first Malayalam children's publisher to syndicate comics produced by India Book House (Amar Chitra Katha) and publish Amar Chitra Katha in Malayalam.

Poompatta under PAICO is considered as "one of the pioneering children’s magazines in Malayalam". Before the rise of the Balarama magazine in the mid-1980s, it was the market leader and trendsetter among the Malayalam comic magazines. Prominent Malayalam children's authors such as N. M. Mohan (1978–82) and R. Gopalakrishnan (1982–1986) served as editors of the magazine in the 1980s (under publisher S. V. Pai).

== Publication history ==
Over a span of 44 years, from 1964 to 2008, Poompatta reached its readers through the efforts of five different publishers. Poompatta stands out as the only children's publication in Malayalam to have emerged from the workshops of various publishers at different times.

Various nicknames were assigned to Poompatta magazines to distinguish them under different publishers and formats across different periods. These include Warrier Poompatta, Sithara Poompatta, Paico Poompatta, Manorajyam Poompatta, and Suryaprabha Poompatta.

=== Warrier Poompatta (1964–1973) ===
P.A. Warrier, a writer, translator, and an official of All India Radio, founded Poompatta and served as its first editor. From 1964 to March 1973, Poompatta, under the auspices of Warrier Publishers, reached Malayali readers. Similar to Balarama in the 1970s, Warrier Poompatta targeted relatively older children. While the inside pages were in black & white, the magazine cover boasted multicolored designs. However, in early 1973, due to labour issues and financial constraints at the printing press established by Warrier, Poompatta's publication had to be halted.

=== Sithara Poompatta (1973-1974) ===
Two months later, in June 1973, the rights to Poompatta were acquired from Warrier by P.A. Madhavan Nair, from Ernakulam. Nair resumed Poompatta's publication under Sithara Publications, which he owned. Sithara Poompatta maintained similar content and production quality as Warrier Poompatta. However, financial difficulties led Madhavan Nair to cease the publication of Poompatta under Sithara Publications after nearly a year.

=== The golden period: Paico Poompatta (1978–1989) ===
After a gap of four years, in 1978, Pai & Company (PAICO) of Kochi took over the production of Poompatta. The first issue of Paico Poompatta was released in June 1978. Until late 1989, Poompatta was published by PAICO, marking the golden period in its history.

During this time, Poompatta underwent drastic changes in content and printing quality to make it enjoyable for kids and adults of all ages. Paico Poompatta's unique page layout and aesthetics were later imitated by all other children's publications in Malayalam. It was around this time that Poompatta became a bi-weekly publication and was launched in offset printing.

Ananta Pai's famous comic character Kapishfirst appeared in Malayalam through Paico Poompatta. It was during the PAICO era that Poompatta acquired the reputation of being the most popular children's publication in India, with a record sale of about two and a quarter lakh copies per month. Late N.M. Mohanan (who became editor of Balarama later) and R. Gopalakrishnan, former secretary of Kerala Sahitya Academy, graced Poompatta's editorship during this period.

Unfortunately, the labor strikes that began at PAICO in the late 1980s, and the indifference of the management to resolve them and move forward, paved the way for the end of Paico Poompatta in 1989.

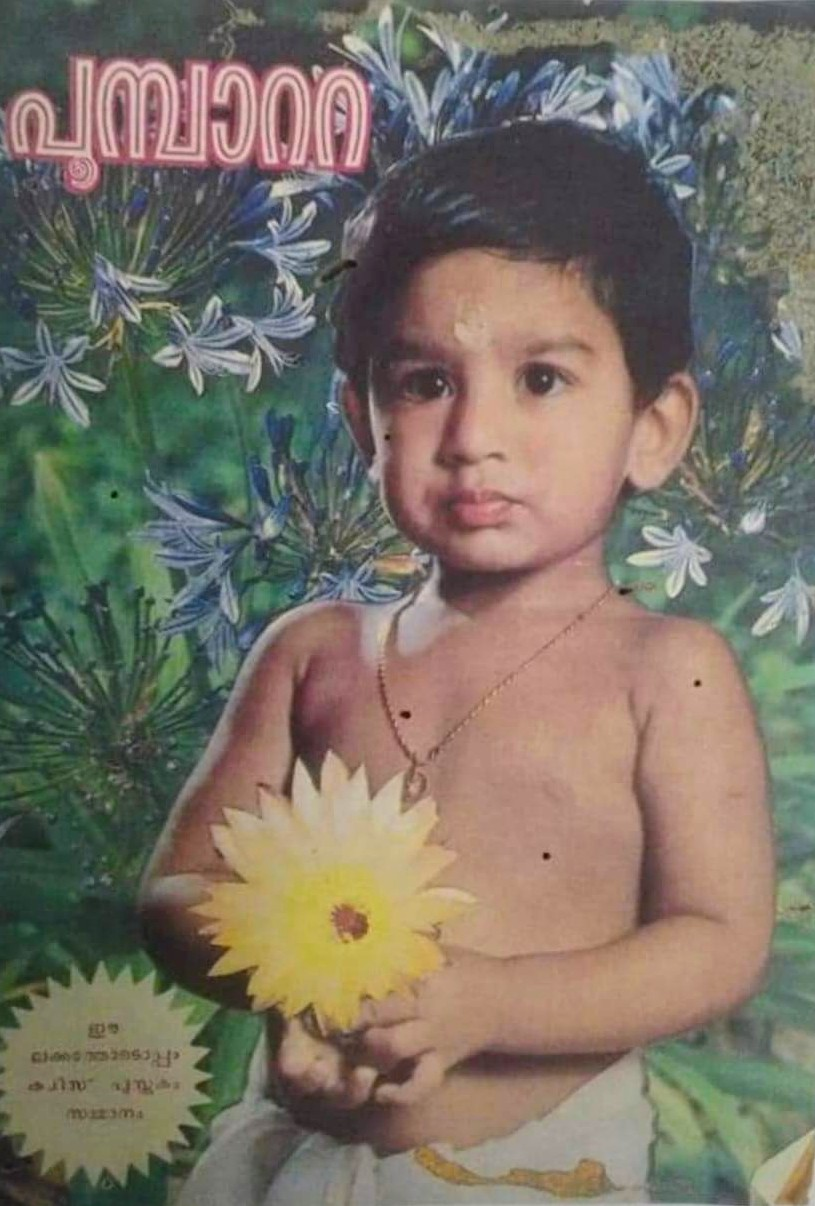
Paico Poompatta (October 15–31, 1989)

=== Manorajyam Poompatta (1990–2002) ===
In 1990, the Manorajyam Group of Kottayam took over the publication of Poompatta from PAICO. Manorajyam Publications was then owned by R. Mohan, also known as Goodknight Mohan, a film producer in the Malayalam film industry who produced films under his production company, Shogun Films. The Manorajyam Group, had previously published Lalu Leela, a leading children's publication in Malayalam in the early 80s. The Manorajyam Group managed to sustain the publication of Poompatta for a decade, albeit being unable to uphold the splendour and beauty of Paico Poompatta. However, in 2002, the publication of Manorajyam Poompatta also ceased.

=== Suryaprabha Poompatta (2002–2008) ===
Poompatta was lastly published by Suryaprabha Publications, Thrissur. It was the fifth and final publisher of Poompatta (as of now). The first issue of Suryaprabha Poompatta was released in the second week of April 2002. Suryaprabha Poompatta was adorned in full multicolour print. Its publication also ceased in 2008 after six years of circulation.

The publication rights of Poompatta are still held by Suryaprabha Publications. As of 2026, it has been 18 years since Poompatta ceased publication, the longest gap in its history.

== Republication attempts ==
Since 2020, there has been a renewed interest in bringing back Poompatta in some form, spurred by former readers and ex-employees of PAICO Poompatta who connect through social media groups, particularly Facebook. Responding to this, the PAICO group has been republishing some issues of its popular illustrated series PAICO Classics, with support from the reader community. Notably, this community has also played a big supportive role in the publication of three original works first published in Paico Poompatta: Amarjit Singh, a novel by K Radhakrishnan about Chambal bandits, Bhoopathikkotta, another popular novel by the same author and Rukkuvinte Sahasangal, a collection of stories featuring a clever deer, authored by R. Gopalakrishnan. The PAICO group has also recently republished two collections of early Kapish comics. Efforts are underway to publish more titles in the future.

== See also ==
- Balarama (magazine)
- Malarvadi
- PAICO Classics
