= PAICO Classics =

Indian comic series

Paico Classics, also Paico Classics Illustrated, was a series of Indian comic books published by Pai and Company (PAICO), Cochin between April 1984 and December 1988. The series were the reprints of "Pendulum Illustrated Classics" (Pendulum Press) translated into various Indian languages (initially in Malayalam, later in Tamil as well as the original English). R. Gopalakrishnan, also associated with the Poompatta children's magazine, was the editor of Paico Classics.

In 1985 February, prominent Malayalam authors Thakazhi Sivasankara Pillai, Kamala Surayya and M. T. Vasudevan Nair participated in the launching function of the series.

Pai and Company republished the series in Malayalam and English during 1998–2000.

== Titles published ==
- Twenty Thousand Leagues Under the Seas — Jules Verne
- A Christmas Carol — Charles Dickens
- A Midsummer Night's Dream — William Shakespeare
- A Tale of Two Cities — Charles Dickens
- As You Like It — William Shakespeare
- Ben-Hur — Lew Wallace
- Black Beauty — Anna Sewell
- Crime and Punishment — Fyodor Dostoyevsky
- Don Quixote — Miguel de Cervantes
- Dr. Jekyll and Mr. Hyde — Robert Louis Stevenson
- Dracula — Bram Stoker
- Food of the Gods — H. G. Wells
- Frankenstein — Mary Shelley
- Great Expectations — Charles Dickens
- Gulliver's Travels — Jonathan Swift
- Hamlet — William Shakespeare
- Huckleberry Finn — Samuel L. Clemens (Mark Twain)
- Iliad — Homer
- Ivanhoe — Walter Scott
- Julius Caesar — William Shakespeare
- Kidnapped — R L Stevenson
- King Lear — William Shakespeare
- Macbeth — William Shakespeare
- Merchant of Venice — William Shakespeare
- Moby Dick — Herman Melville
- Oliver Twist — Charles Dickens
- Othello — William Shakespeare
- Pride and Prejudice — Jane Austen
- Robinson Crusoe — Daniel Defoe
- Romeo and Juliet — William Shakespeare
- The Sea-Wolf — Jack London
- Stories of O. Henry — William Sidney Porter (O. Henry)
- Taming of the Shrew — William Shakespeare
- The Adventures of Sherlock Holmes — Arthur Conan Doyle
- The Hound of the Baskervilles — Arthur Conan Doyle
- The Hunchback of Notre Dame — Victor Hugo
- The Invisible Man — H. G. Wells
- The Man in the Iron Mask — Alexandre Dumas
- The Mysterious Island — Jules Verne
- The Odyssey — Homer
- The Prince and the Pauper — Samuel L. Clemens (Mark Twain)
- The Prisoner of Zenda — Anthony Hope
- The Return of the Native — Thomas Hardy
- The Scarlet Pimpernel — Baroness Orczy
- The Tempest — William Shakespeare
- The Three Musketeers — Alexandre Dumas
- The War of the Worlds — H. G. Wells
- The Time Machine — H. G. Wells
- Tom Sawyer — Samuel L. Clemens (Mark Twain)
- Treasure Island — Robert Louis Stevenson
- Twelfth Night — William Shakespeare

== See also ==
- Anant Pai
- Les Grands Classiques de la littérature en bande dessinée
