= Woman's Era =

Indian women's magazine published in English

- May 2018 edition's cover, of magazine
- Editor: Divesh Nath
- Categories: Women's interest
- Frequency: Fortnightly
- Founder: Vishwanath
- Founded: 1973
- Company: Delhi Press
- Country: India
- Language: English
- Website: womansera.com

Woman's Era is an Indian fortnightly women interest magazine, published in English. It was started in 1973 by Vishwanath under his publishing house, the Delhi Press. The magazine is owned by the Delhi Press. Divesh Nath has been the managing editor of the magazine since 2002.

Woman's Era covers diverse topics including fashion, cookery, movie and book review, health, relationships, beauty, lifestyle, travel and technology, with comments on socialites and current events. It includes poems and short stories. It is the second most popular women's magazine after Femina, with an All India Index of 80 as surveyed by the Indian Readership Survey (IRS).
