= Mangalam Publications =

Indian publishing company

Mangalam newspaper
- Type: Daily newspaper
- Format: Broadsheet
- Founded: 1969; 57 years ago
- Headquarters: Kottayam, Kerala
- Country: India
- Website: mangalam.com
- Free online archives: epaper.mangalam.com

Mangalam Publications (India) Private Limited, is an Indian publishing company in Kottayam, Kerala, India. It publishes online daily newspaper and weekly magazines such as Mangalam Weekly, Kanyaka and Cinema Mangalam in Malayalam. They also publish some magazines in Kannada language. Printed from Kottayam, Kochi, Kozhikode, Thiruvananthapuram, Idukki, Kannur and Thrissur, Mangalam is the sixth most circulated Malayalam daily.

The company was founded by M. C. Varghese in 1969 as a monthly journal, with a circulation of 250 copies. Later it became a weekly magazine.

== Publications ==
=== Malayalam ===
- Mangalam Weekly
- Kanyaka Magazine - women's fortnightly
- Cinema Mangalam - weekly film weekly

=== Kannada ===
- Mangala
- Balamangala

== See also ==
- Dinkan
- List of Malayalam-language newspapers
- List of Malayalam-language periodicals
- List of newspapers in India
