= Rythubandhu =

Rythubandhu is a Telugu language agricultural magazine published by Best publications from India. This magazine, which has been in publication since 2010, has been edited by editors like N.Vamshi Mohan in the past. The present editor is N.Laxmi Mohan. It has drifted from being a pure agricultural magazine to a more current affairs-oriented format. Rythubandhu is published from Himayath Nagar, Hyderabad.

Recently, Rythubandhu has ventured into book publishing. The magazine announced RythuBandhu 2013 awards also. It is now part of Narla media Network private limited, established in 2011–12. The company also published a fortnightly business magazine Economy & Business Chronicle.
