= Kuttikalude Deepika =

- Categories: Children's magazine
- Frequency: Fortnightly
- First issue: 1952
- Company: Rashtra Deepika Ltd
- Country: India
- Based in: Kottayam, Kerala
- Language: Malayalam

Kuttikalude Deepika is a Malayalam children's magazine published from Kottayam, Kerala by Rashtra Deepika Ltd.

The magazine is one of the pioneering children's magazine in Malayalam, started in 1952 and still publishing print and online editions.
