= CTO Forum =

Indian magazine

- Categories: IT magazine
- Frequency: Fortnightly
- Publisher: 9.9 Media
- Founded: 2005
- Company: 9.9 Media
- Country: India
- Language: English
- Website: CTOForum.org

The CTO Forum is an IT magazine for India CTO community published fortnightly by 9.9 Media. It is targeted at technology professionals in enterprises. The company, 9.9 Media, also holds a well-known event called The CTO Forum, a summit.

The magazine was started by the Jasubhai Group in 2005.
