= Thathamma =

- Categories: comic magazine
- Frequency: fortnightly
- Final issue: 2015
- Company: Deshabhimani
- Country: India
- Based in: Kannur, Kerala
- Language: Malayalam

Thathamma is a fortnightly comic magazine in Malayalam. The magazine is published in English by Balasangam state committee Kerala.

== Content ==
Thathamma targets children. The magazine, which features stories, cartoons, and comics, emphasizes moral values and aims at enhancing knowledge through humor and hobbies. Its sister publication is Deshabhimani, a political paper founded on 6 September 1942. ONV Kurup served as the editor-in-chief of Thathamma.
