= Muthassi (novel) =

1957 novel by Cherukad

Muthassi is a historical Malayalam novel written by Cherukad, published in 1957. The novel describes the social and cultural backgrounds of Malayalis from the period from 1930 to 1950. It explains about the life of teachers, the harassments they had to face by the managers, it describes the unjust actions and orders the managers forcefully imposed on their dependent teachers. The story uses the colloquial language which was used by the people in the villages so that the novel is presented in a natural way.

The narration is made by the heroine Nani, and is told through her point of view, although the title is dedicated for her grandmother. Nani's grandmother is yet another major character in the story. She represents a typical old generation woman, strictly holding ethics and certain orthodox conventions. But Nani struggles with her grandmother for moving on with the pace of the contemporary society, the situation symbolically illustrates the struggle made by the new generation ideas with the old generation concepts and finally the conventional concepts being replaced by the most modern ideas.

Nani is an educated woman who worked as a teacher. She worked in the teachers' union and made many developments in the field of education. However, some political issues made her jobless. She was attracted towards the socialist ideas which were spreading fast in many places of India at the time of independence. The main reason for her dismissal was her strong belief on socialist ideas and because of the support she offered for the Communist Party. Her brother, husband and many dearer and nearer peoples worked hard for promoting socialistic ideas and were sent to jail. Gradually, her grandmother was also interested in such democratic concepts and she finally accepted that socialism is the best way to implement the righteousness and social equality of all class of people. Grandma firmly believed in communism and in a particular point of the story, she was even sent to jail. But the extraordinary boldness of the heroine made her strong enough to endure all such hardships.

== See also ==
- Cherukad#Novel
