= ParentCircle =

Indian mass circulation monthly magazine

- Categories: Parenting magazine
- Frequency: Monthly
- First issue: April 16, 2011
- Country: India
- Language: English
- Website: www.parentcircle.com
- ISSN: 2395-7166

ParentCircle, published by Shri Harini Media Ltd, is an Indian mass circulation monthly magazine that features information on parenting and child development geared towards parents. It is based in Chennai, Tamil Nadu.

== History ==
The magazine was started in 2011 by Nalina Ramalakshmi, with connection to the Ramco Group. It focuses on parenting, needs of children, and parenting techniques. Their monthly paper features information about child health, safety, behavior, discipline and education. The magazine's first issue was published on April 16, 2011, followed by rapid growth. Parent Circle was funded through internal investment from the Ramco Group family.

In November 2021, ParentCircle sponsored a "#gadgetfreeday" to encourage children to disconnect from their phones and spend less time on electronic devices.

ParentCircle has a circulation of 22K - 30K reaching with around 100,000 total readers.
