= Bobanum Moliyum (1971 film) =

- Directed by: J. Sasikumar
- Written by: Toms; S. L. Puram Sadanandan (dialogues)
- Screenplay by: S. L. Puram Sadanandan
- Based on: Boban and Molly by Toms
- Starring: Madhu; Kaviyoor Ponnamma; Adoor Bhasi; Manavalan Joseph
- Cinematography: P. B. Mani
- Edited by: K. Sankunni
- Music by: Joseph Krishna
- Production company: RA Productions
- Release date: 30 April 1971
- Country: India
- Language: Malayalam

Bobanum Moliyum (transl. Boban and Molly) is a 1971 Indian Malayalam-language film, directed by J. Sasikumar. The film stars Madhu, Kaviyoor Ponnamma, Adoor Bhasi and Manavalan Joseph. It features the Malayalam cartoon characters, which were created by Toms: Boban and Molly.

== Cast ==
- Madhu as Balan
- Kaviyoor Ponnamma as Santhamma
- Adoor Bhasi as Uppayi
- Manavalan Joseph as Pothan Vakkeel
- Muthukulam Raghavan Pillai as Velu Pilla
- Sankaradi as Mammad
- Adoor Bhavani as Kuttiyamma
- Baby Rajani as Molly
- Bahadoor as Ittoop
- Kaduvakulam Antony as Pilla
- Master Sekhar as Boban
- Meena as Saramma
- Pankajavalli as Marykutty
- S. P. Pillai as Kittu Pilla
- Vettoor Purushan as Pareed
- Vijayasree as Nalini
- Pala Thankam
- P. R. Menon as Gopala Pilla

== Soundtrack ==
The music was composed by Joseph Krishna and the lyrics were written by Vayalar Ramavarma.

No.	Song	Singers	Lyrics	Length (m:ss)
1	"Achan Kombathu"	P. Susheela	Vayalar Ramavarma	
2	"Bobanum Moliyum" (Title Song)	Chorus	Vayalar Ramavarma	
3	"Italy Germany"	Pattom Sadan	Vayalar Ramavarma	
4	"Kilukilukkaam"	L. R. Eeswari, Chorus	Vayalar Ramavarma	
5	"Maalaakhamaarude"	P. Susheela	Vayalar Ramavarma	
6	"Manorame Nin Panchavadi"	K. J. Yesudas	Vayalar Ramavarma	
7	"Nanma Niranja Mariyame"	B. Vasantha, Renuka	Vayalar Ramavarma	
8	"Vidyaapeedham Ividam Nammude"	P. Jayachandran, Chorus	Vayalar Ramavarma	
