= Aside (magazine) =

Defunct Indian English Magazine

Aside was an English-language newsmagazine that used to be published from Chennai, the capital of Tamil Nadu, India. It was founded in November 1977 by Abraham Eraly and ceased publication in 1997 because of financial difficulties. It was the first city magazine in India and was modeled on American city magazines, especially The New Yorker. It carried columns by Theodore Baskaran, Randor Guy and S. Muthiah. The magazine's subtitle was 'The Magazine of Madras'. In 1986 facing market pressures the magazine turned into a fortnightly news magazine.
