= Balarama (magazine) =

Indian comic magazine

- Editor-in-Charge: A. V. Harisanker
- Former editors: N. M. Mohan (1983 - 2012)
- Categories: Comic magazine; Children’s magazine
- Frequency: Weekly
- Circulation: 99,804 (Audit Bureau of Circulations, July–December 2018); Readership (TR) - 2,819,000 (Nielsen IRS 2019, Quarter IV)
- Publisher: V. Sajeev George
- Founded: 1972
- Company: Malayala Manorama Publications Limited
- Country: India
- Based in: Kottayam, Kerala
- Language: Malayalam
- Website: Official website
- ISSN: 0975-0339

Balarama (transl. Joy of Kids) is an Indian weekly comic magazine published by M. M. Publications, of Malayala Manorama Group from Kottayam, Kerala in Malayalam language (digest-sized, on every Friday). It is one of the most widely read children's magazines in India (Indian Readership Survey 2019, Quarter IV). Balarama celebrated its 50th year of publication in the year 2022.

Starting as a monthly for teenage youngsters in March 1972, the Balarama became a fortnightly periodical in November 1984, before finally settling as a weekly in 1999. Along with the comics (in-house and syndicated), the content includes fables and fairy tales, rhymes, (translated) literary classics, and various puzzles. Balarama is known for its decades-long partnership with Amar Chitra Katha/India Book House (thus publishing Shikari Shambu, Kapish, Kalia the Crow, Suppandi and Tantri the Mantri and the Malayalam Amar Chitra Katha). Major American comics syndicated by the magazine include Disney Comics and various super-heroes (Spider-Man, Batman, the Phantom and Mandrake the Magician). The magazine was famously edited by N. M. Mohan from 1983 to 2012.

Malayala Manorama also publishes Balarama Amar Chitra Katha, Kalikkudukka, Balarama Digest (all in Malayalam), MagicPot, Manorama Tell Me Why, National Geographic Kids (English) and Akkad Bakkad (Hindi).

== Publication history ==
=== Early period (1972–1983): for teenage youngsters ===
Balarama was started on 1 March 1972 as a monthly magazine by M. M. Publications, of Malayala Manorama Group. Pala K. M. Mathew and Kadavanadu Kuttikrishnan were the first two editors of the magazine. From the beginning (1973), the magazine was praised for its "standard of content". Leading Kerala literary figures such as Vyloppilli Sreedhara Menon, P. Bhaskaran, Uroob, P. Kunhiraman Nair, and Sukumar Azhikode used to write for the magazine. The target audience was teenage youngsters more than children in this early period (over the years, the target audience was changed to children). The magazine became popular with the readers as early as 1975.

Most of the early attempts to publish popular children's magazines in Malayalam were failures (except the magazine "Ambili Ammavan", the Malayalam version of the Tamil "Chandamama"). Poompatta, from the Pai and Pai Company (PAICO), was the first truly popular children's magazine in Kerala. N. M. Mohan, the editor of Poompatta of the time (1978–82), is considered as "the architect and designer" of all the later "children's magazines" of Kerala.

=== Golden age (1983–2000): with India Book House ===
In 1983, N. M. Mohan moved to Balarama and took charge as editor-in-chief. He created the iconic Mayavi series, with Mumbai-based artist Pradeep Sathe. It debuted in the August 1984 issue of the magazine (and soon went on to become the flagship strip). The magazine became a fortnightly periodical in November 1984.

It was during this period that Malayalam Manorama entered into a publishing and distribution association with Indian Book House. Balarama, in the ensuing years, created a record in the history of the circulation of Malayalam children's magazines and replaced Poompatta as the market leader. The Malayalam version of Amar Chitra Katha, a sister publication to Balarama, is estimated to have sold around 140,000 copies in the 1980s. The success of Balarama soon inspired other Malayalam daily newspapers to follow suit and produce a number of similar magazines. In the early 1990s, the magazine was able to print completely in multi-colour. From 17 April 1999, the fortnightly became a weekly.

=== Competition for the juvenile market (2000–present) ===
A major breakthrough in the development of Balarama came in the 25 March 2000 issue. From this issue, it started syndicating American comic strips, Spider-Man. It was the first time an American superhero appeared in a Malayalam comic magazine. The trend of syndicated superheroes followed as Batman, the Phantom and Mandrake the Magician comics also appeared in subsequent years. In the summer of 2000, the magazine also started syndicating Disney Comics and Henry strips. Pinocchio was the first Disney comic to syndicate, followed by classics such as Cinderella and Alice in Wonderland.

In mid-2001, the magazine started a new in-house series Soothran, which later became quite popular among readers. More than 500 weekly strips of Soothran have been published so far, each one about 4 or 5 pages in length.

After the retirement of N. M. Mohan in 2012, A. V. Harisanker took over the charge as the editor-in-chief.

In March 2022, Balarama completed 50 years. To celebrate this occasion, a special golden jubilee edition was published.

== Famous comics and series that appeared in Balarama ==
This is a list showing the famous comics and series that appeared in Balarama.

From its early period, cartoonist P. J. Venugopal's series appears in every issue of the magazine. Series such as Thalamaratte, Pulivalu and Jambanum Thumbanum, discussing relevant social issues, were quite popular among the readers. Venugopal also draws the last page strip, known as Mrigathipathyam Vannal.

=== In-house (Malayalam) ===
- Mayavi (flagship comic)
- Luttappi
- Soothran
- Akku & Ikku
- Oridathoridathu (folk tales)
- Jungle Book (based on the 1989 TV series)
- Munchausen
- Jamban and Thumban
- Mirgadhipathyam Vannal (When animals rule)
- Rainbow Riyon
- SP RANVEER BISWAL
- Dundumon (ഡുണ്ടുമോൻ)

=== Syndicated ===
==== Indian ====
Balarama is known for its decades-long partnership with Amar Chitra Katha (India Book House). Until recently, M. M. Publications held the rights to publish Amar Chitra Katha comics in Malayalam.

- Shikari Shambu (from 1985)
- Kapish (before Mayavi)
- Suppandi
- Kalia the Crow (from 1985)
- Tantri the Mantri
- Shikari Shambu
- Pyarelal series
- Janoo and Wooly Woo
- Mahabharata (Dilip Kadam)
- Inspector Garud (Pradeep Sathe)
- Inspector Azad (Aabid Surti)
- Shaktiman
- Chhota Bheem

==== International ====
- Disney Comics
- Spider-Man
- Henry
- Batman
- The Phantom
- Mandrake the Magician
- Dennis the Menace
- Dora the Explorer

== See also ==
- Champak
- Tinkle
