= Directorate of Advertising and Visual Publicity =

Indian government agency

- Other name: DAVP
- Type: Nodal agency
- Established: 01 March 1942; 84 years ago
- President: Ministry of Information and Broadcasting (India)
- Director: Dhirendra Ojha
- Location: New Delhi, India
- Campus: Urban
- Website: davp.nic.in

The Directorate of Advertising and Visual Publicity (DAVP) was the nodal agency of the Government of India for advertising by various Ministries and organisations of Government of India, including public sector undertakings and autonomous bodies.

== History ==
The agency was founded in March 1, 1942. At the time of the Second World War, the Government of India asked the leading advertisement agencies to form a consortium and set up a publicity unit in Shimla to handle war propaganda, tackle rumour mongering, put out messages about black-outs and handle recruitment to the armed forces.

When the war ended, this consortium was converted into its present form. It was established in 1955 and has its headquarters in Delhi and regional offices in Bangalore and Guwahati. Its work is further facilitated by two regional distribution centres at Kolkata and Chennai. The Directorate includes 4 Campaign wings, an Advertising wing for print, Audio-Visual (AV) wing, New Media & Personal Media wing, Exhibition wing, Mass mailing wing, Outdoor publicity wing, research wing, distribution wing and language wing in addition to an audio visual publicity cell.

== Director/DG/PDG ==
- Sh L R Nair 01.1o.1955 to 14.05.1963
- Sh M L Bhardwaj
- Sh B Mukhopadhyay
- Brig.R Shreenivasan
- SH H J D Penha
- Sh K K Nair
- Sh P R Chona
- Sh N Sethi
- Sh R Raina
- Sh B C Bhatt
- Sh P B Bharthakur
- Sh G Venkatraman
- Ms Shahla Haider
- Sh S Narendra
- Dhirendra Ojha (DG)
