= Kadambini =

Indian magazine

- Categories: Literature, culture, general interest
- Frequency: Monthly
- Publisher: Hindustan Times Media
- Founded: 1960
- Final issue: 2020
- Based in: Delhi
- Language: Hindi

Kadambini was a noted Hindi-language literary monthly magazine from Delhi-based Hindustan Times Media. Established in 1960, it covers a wide range of subjects including literature, science, history, sociology, politics, films and sports.

== History ==
Through the 1960s, under its founding editor Balkrishna Rao and later under Rajendra Awasthi, Kadambini and a few other leading publications of the time, started publishing short stories (laghu katha) by leading writers like Agyeya, Mahadevi Verma, Kunwar Narayan and Ramanada Doshi. This in time had an important impact on the growth of short story movement (Nayi Kahani) in Hindi literature. Soon, it became a prominent magazine of North India, and flourished through the 1980s, and along with magazines like Dharmyug and Sarika, allowed Hindi-language media to acquire a character of their own.

The magazine also awards, the annual "Kadambini Prizes", given after on-the-spot essay and short story competitions. The last issue of Kadambini was published in September 2020.
