= Debonair (magazine) =

Indian monthly entertainment magazine

Debonair India
- Debonair cover featuring Antara Biswas
- Editor: Ratnakar Mavilach
- Categories: Entertainment Magazine
- Frequency: Monthly
- Publisher: Mavilach Group
- Founded: 1973
- First issue: April 1974
- Company: Debonair Foundation
- Country: India
- Language: English
- Website: debonairmagazine.com

Debonair is an English-language monthly magazine published by the Be Debonair Foundation. It is one of India's most popular entertainment magazines and includes news, interviews, photos, videos, reviews, events, and style. Previously Debonair was an Indian monthly men's magazine, originally modeled after Playboy.

== History and profile ==
Debonair was founded in 1973 and its first issue was published in April 1974. The founder was Susheel Somani and the founding company was G. Claridge Printing Press, owned by Somani.

The magazine, best known for its topless female centerfolds, was first edited by Ashok Row Kavi and Anthony Van Braband. Vinod Mehta also worked as the editor of the magazine. It was published on a monthly basis. Under the editor Derek Bose, Debonair was reformatted to remove nudity and target a younger demographic in 2005.

Debonair has also featured a number of Indian film actresses on its cover when they were just beginning their careers. This includes Juhi Chawla and Madhuri Dixit, photographed by the photographer Gautam Rajadhyaksha.

The magazine was relaunched by the Be Debonair Foundation in 2022. It is now part of Mavilach Group. Ratnakar Mavilach is the magazine's editor.
