= Mayavi =

Malayalam comic strip

Māyāvi
- The former title logo of the Mayavi comics. Artwork by Pradeep Sathe

Publication information
- Publisher: Balarama
- First appearance: Balarama (August 1984)

In-story information
- Species: Imp
- Abilities: Invisibility, Magic Staff
Kuttichaththen
Publication information
- Schedule: Weekly (current)
- Format: Ongoing series
- Genre: see below
Creative team
- Written by: N.M. Mohan
- Artist(s): Pradeep Sathe; M. Mohandas; Thyagarajan

Māyāvi is a Malayalam comic strip appearing in the Indian comic magazine Balarama owned by MM Publications. The series, was first published in the August 1984 issue of Balarama. Artist M. Mohandas gradually took over the drawing of the series after Balarama became a fortnightly.

Māyāvi, the protagonist in the series, is a goblin, who helps keep the forest safe from villains and dark wizards. Most of the stories revolves around how two dark magicians and their companions try to capture Māyāvi, but fail hilariously. Māyāvi takes place in a secluded forest in Kerala. It is not exactly known when the story takes place. In the local language Malayalam Māyāvi is a combination of two words (māya+āvi) when translated mean magic and spirit respectively. As the target audience is young, the story takes the liberty to draw a fantasy world, in which wizards, demons and other strange creatures exist. However, despite the simplicity and slapstick comedy, Māyāvi became one of the most widely read children's comics in Malayalam language.

== Characters ==
=== Māyāvi (മായാവി) ===
Māyāvi, a goblin (ചാത്തൻ), who was enslaved by the evil witch Dāgini(ഡാഗിനി) so she could take his powers for herself. Two kids, Rāju(രാജു) and Rādha(രാധ) help the goblin escape from the bottle in which Dāgini had trapped him. Thankful to the children, Māyāvi promises to help them whenever they are threatened by the forces of evil. Dāgini pledges to take revenge on the children and re-capture Māyāvi. The comics pictures him staying alone in a forest without any notable family. Māyāvi is loathed by the evil creatures and villains of the forest. Robbers who often take refuge in the forest to hide are brought to light by Māyāvi.

Apart from the power of invisibility, Māyāvi is not known to possess any magical powers, but derives them from his red wand. Without his wand he can easily be captured as he becomes very subservient without it, obeying whoever holds his wand. This handicap has been one of the prominent vulnerabilities that is often exploited by the dark wizards who try to capture him. With Māyāvi around, the forest is safe from evil.

His wand (red in color and closely resembling a mace) has the ability to set of a cascade of random events that fulfill/are in favour to what the user wishes. Māyāvi has a hobby of sleeping under trees.

=== Rāju and Rādha (രാജുവും രാധയും) ===
Rāju and Rādha are assumed to be a couple (although it isn't explicitly mentioned in the comic), who rescues Māyāvi by chance and end up getting his protection. He also tells them a special chant to summon him. Whenever the children chant: "Ohm Hreem Kuttichaatha", Māyāvi will come rushing to their aid. He will only appear if the children say the chant.

The children are often depicted as roaming about in the forest.

The children are often imprisoned by Küttoosen(കുട്ടൂസൻ) and Dagini in a bid to lure Mayavi and thereby trap him. Another common storyline is one in which the children overhear the planning or execution of some dastardly crime. In such situations the children summon Mayavi using the spell "Om hreem kutichathaa".

=== Küttoosen (കുട്ടൂസൻ) ===
Dākini's partner and a dark wizard who lives in a large hollowed out, dead tree trunk in the same forest. He serves as one of the main antagonists in the comic other than Dākini. The storyline depicts Küttoosen as a bald old man in a blue robe whose sole purpose in life is to capture Māyāvi. He often goes out of his way to befriend beasts and other dark creatures (imps, wizards etc.) in order to fulfill his aim. However, his clumsiness in handling matters related to magic, eventually leads him into trouble. His stupidity and stubbornness is a frequent source of humor in the comic.

=== Dākini (ഡാകിനി) ===
Dākini, a witch, appeared in the series well before Küttoosen, is the partner of Küttoosen. However, despite being a witch, she is often shown to nag, ridicule and mock Küttoosen's wizardry as she thinks he will fail to capture Māyāvi. She is noted as much for her cowardice as for her noodle hair.

Well into her old age, she teams up with Küttoosen with the aim of capturing Māyāvi. She and Küttoosen also never leave out a chance to catch Rāju and Rādha, who they know to be friends of Māyāvi.

She has a pet owl.

=== Luttāppi (ലുട്ടാപ്പി) ===
Luttāppi, is a cute, innocent red coloured little goblin who works as an aide of Küttoosen. One of the primary sources of humor in the comic, Luttāppi is noted for his cheekiness and cowardice. His stupidity and over excitedness often lands everyone in trouble. Luttāppi owns a magical spear that can fly (it works exactly like a magic broom except that he has to wrap his tail around it to fly). Manned by Luttappi, the spear serves as a convenient mode of transport for Luttappi's and his comrades – Dakini and Kuttusan.

Luttāppi stays with Küttoosen at his home in the tree trunk. Despite being a very resourceful aide, Luttāppi isn't always at good terms with Küttoosen and Dāgini, who take little effort in hiding their dislike. Luttāppi is often portrayed as doing all the housework for Küttoosen. He is also often shown as grumbling under his breath.

=== Vikraman and Muthu (വിക്രമനും മുത്തുവും) ===
Vikraman and Muthu are two notorious bandits at large and wanted by the local police. The comics pictures them as using the forest as a hideout after breaking out of jail. Vikraman and Muthu are friends of Kuttoosan. However, their friendship is strictly limited to the mutual benefits they get out of it. Vikraman and Muthu are never portrayed as having a grudge against Māyāvi. However, they often assist Küttoosen and Dākini in order to capture him.

Vikraman and Muthu's primary aim is to procure as much wealth and power as they can by robbing the bank. However, all their plans are foiled by Māyāvi, who is usually alerted by Rāju and Rādha.

=== Lottulodukku and Gulgulumal (ലൊട്ടുലൊടുക്കും ഗുൽഗുലുമാലും) ===
Lottulodukku and Gulgulumal are two evil scientists who invent new gadgets and ideas to destroy the world. They are afraid of Vikraman and Muthu, who steal their inventions and use these tools for their purposes such as robbing the bank and breaking into people's houses. But Vikraman and Muthu always get into trouble using those gadgets. Their enemies are Raju and Radha, and they are always looking for a chance to kill them.

=== Puttalu (പുട്ടാലു) ===
Uncle of Luttappi, unlike Luttappi, he is dark blue in colour. He is much bigger in size than Luttappi. Kuttusan and Dakini go to Puttalu's den to steal many charms and potions to trap Mayavi, but they get trapped in Puttalu's trap instead.

Everybody is afraid of Puttalu, but Puttalu does not have very significant role in Mayavi. He enjoys sleeping and don't want Luttapi to wander with Kuttusan and Dakini.

=== Lamboochan (ലമ്പൂച്ചൻ) ===
The character often forgotten by many but appears more often than that of Puttalu, is shown as a senior wizard who is a close ally of Kuttusan and Dakini. He has a short trimmed hair with earrings which resembles broad golden rods.

Despite being on the villianish side, he is often portrayed as calm and stoic compared to the rest. He supplies magical items and advises charm or spells or provide new knowledge to his friends (or disciples).

=== Dinkini (ഡിങ്കിനി) ===
Dinkini is a mischievous, green-coloured goblin, who is depicted as the niece and sidekick of the witch Dakini. She is way younger than Kuttoosan's aide Luttappi, and is shown to have a rivalry with him since the day she met Luttappi. She has a pet black cat and also owns a magical quadrident that can fly, in which she and her cat travel.

Dinkini was a new addition to the comic in February 2019. As this character was introduced, rumours spread out that the Balarama publishers were going to replace Luttappi with her. This received a lot of backlash on social media. Luttappi's fans took up the message of 'Save Luttappi' at India vs New Zealand third T20 match in Hamilton, and atlast the publishers confirmed that Luttappi won't get replaced by Dinkini.

== Dress-code change ==
Some of the characters in the series, including Mayavi and Luttappi, underwent a major dress-code change in 2011 after complaints from several parents regarding the inappropriate clothing. According to the editor of the magazine, the changes were intended to make the characters acceptable for readers of all age.

== Mayavi VCD ==
Mayavi-VCD is a 3D animated version of the comic strip published in Balarama. It was released on 23 August 2010 by Manorama Music, a music production company owned by Malayala Manorama Group. Story and concept for this version was also by NM Mohan, who is the creator the comics, which is being published in Balaralam since many decades. The 3D version was developed by Hibiscus Digital Media Pvt. Ltd, Thiruvananthapuram. The music for the title song, Nammude Veeran Mayavi was done by Mohan Sithara, while the score and other songs were composed by Jaison. J. Nair. The lyrics were written by Sippy Pallippuram.

== In popular culture ==
Due to immense popularity of the magazine the characters became pop culture icons with TV shows, movies and other stories referencing or based around them.

- The Balarama Cave at Wonderla, is modelled using characters from Mayavi.
- The title of the Malayalam film Mayavi (2007 film) is from the series.
- The characters Vikraman and Muthu made an appearance in the movie Amen (2013 film).
- The main character in the 2024 movie Aavesham named Amban have a similar dressing style of Vikraman.
