= Vellinakshatram (magazine) =

- Cover of Vellinakshatram, Edition no.1155
- Frequency: Weekly
- Founded: 1989
- Company: Kalakaumudi
- Country: India
- Based in: Thiruvananthapuram, Kerala
- Language: Malayalam
- Website: https://www.vellinakshatram.com

Vellinakshatram is a film weekly news magazine published in Malayalam Language from Kerala, India. It is printed at Thiruvananthapuram and distributed throughout Kerala by Kalakaumudi Publications Private Limited. Although the magazine has lineages with Kerala Kaumudi news paper, it is an independent company. It highlights the doings and happenings of the Mollywood film scene. It is one of the most popular entertainment magazine in Malayalam, it is read by the overseas Indian community worldwide. The group discontinued the much acclaimed Film Magazine and launched Vellinakshatram.

It also organizes and sponsors the Vellinakshatram Film Awards.

== Regular segments ==
- Hit Chart - This segment consists of the Box-Office ratings of Malayalam films.
- VCD Releases - This segment consists of the new and old Malayalam film VCD & DVD releases with the film content and story line.
- Location - This segment consists of Shooting reports.
- Ithalukal - This segment consists of Announced/Shooting updations.
- Fan Mail - This segment consists of letters from the readers.
- Bollywood Buzzzz - This segment consists news from Bollywood.
- Tamil Cinema - This segment consists news from Kollywood.
