= Mangalam Weekly =

Malayalam language Magazine

- Website type: Local interest magazine
- Available in: Malayalam
- Country of origin: India
- Owner: Mangalam Publications (India) Private Limited
- Managing director: M. C. Varghese
- Website: www.mangalam.com
- Commercial: Yes
- Launched: 1969; 57 years ago
- Current status: Active

Mangalam Weekly (or Mangalam Varika) is an Indian Malayalam-language weekly magazine based in Kottayam, Kerala, India. Sajil Sreedhar is the current editor.

== History and profile ==
Mangalam was started by M. C. Varghese in 1969 as a monthly magazine. He also edited the magazine, which was later published on a weekly basis. The magazine is published by Mangalam Publications. It had a circulation of 1.7 million copies in 1984, and publishes a special international edition for non-residents.

It is known for the regular column "Victims of cruel fate", which brings attention to, and raises funds for people who have suffered. It has also weekly reading material relating to dowry victims.

The magazine is also published in Kannada. Mangalam ceased to be published in print in April 2022 and converted to a digital platform.

== Editors ==
- Devasya Manimla (1969 – 1973)
- Issac Pilathara (1973 – 1974)
- Dr. George Thayyil (1975 – 1976)
- Ambattu Sukumaran Nair (1977 – 1982)
- Dr. Naduvattom Sathyaseelan (1983 – 1986) (1988 – 1995) (2007 – 2008)
- M. J. Darris (1986 – 1988)
- Hakim Nattasery (1995– 2002) (2009 – 2012)
- P.O.Mohan (2003- 2006) (2018- 2020)
- Sajil Sreedhar (2012 – 2018) (2020–2023)
