= Balabhumi =

- Cover of a Balabhumi issue
- Managing Editor: P. V. Chandran
- Categories: Comic magazine
- Frequency: Weekly
- Publisher: P. V. Nidhish
- Founded: 1996
- Company: Mathrubhumi Printing and Publishing Company Limited
- Country: India
- Based in: Kozhikode, Kerala
- Language: Malayalam
- Website: https://www.mathrubhumi.com/kids/

Balabhumi (Malayalam: ബാലഭൂമി) is a Malayalam comic magazine published by Mathrubhumi Publications. It was launched in April, 1996 by the Calicut-based Malayalam newspaper Mathrubhumi. The magazine became a weekly in May 1996.

Along with comics (in-house and syndicated), the content includes fables and fairytales, rhymes, (translated) literary classics, and various puzzles. It is the first Malayalam comic magazine to syndicate Disney Comics.

== Stories and articles ==
- Magic Malu (artist: M. Mohandas) story of a magician rabbit who helps everybody facing any problem.
- E-Man (Unnikrishnan kidangoor, Jingle bell creations) : The only Action Hero of Balabhumi.
- Meeshamarjaran (Vallicode santhosh, Devaprakash) : Story of two best friends but will fall in a trap in the end.
- Kunchoos :(Unnikrishnan kidangoor, Jingle bell creations) One of the naughtiest boy in Balabhumi.
- Mallanunniyum Villanunniyum:(Unnikrishnan kidangoor, Jingle bell creations) Story of two brothers one (Villanunni) is intelligent but not strong another (Mallanunni) is strong but not intelligent.
- Master Tintu: Story of a naughty boy who says super jokes.
- Boli : Story of a girl who is naughty.
- Vikru & Durbalan:(Unnikrishnan Kidangoor, Jingle bell creations ) Story of a little bear got friendly with a lion named Durbalan.
- Gira
