= Champak =

Indian children's magazine

- Categories: Children's Magazine
- Frequency: Fortnightly
- Founded: 1969
- Company: Delhi Press Group
- Country: India
- Language: English, Gujarati, Hindi, Kannada, Malayalam, Marathi, Tamil, Telugu,
- Website: champak.in

Champak is a popular fortnightly magazine for children published by the Delhi Press Group since 1969 in India. Champak competes with Amar Chitra Katha's Tinkle and Geodesic's Chandamama brands of magazines. Champak is published twice a month. It is published in English and 7 other Indian languages. Champak also launched a monthly school magazine called Champak Plus.

== History ==
Champak was founded in 1969 by Vishwanath of Delhi Press. At that time, Champak competed with Chandamama, one of the best Children's selling magazines and Parag (Times of Indian Press) and Nandan (Hindustan Times Press). In 1980, another competitor, Tinkle was released. Yet 'til now, Champak remains one of the favourite magazines of children in India.

== Champak Jogo Disk ==
A CD or DVD is given free of cost with a pack of Multimedia Edition Champak. The CD contains games, activities and interactive graphics for a child to learn.

== Contests ==
Champak has also been conducting Story Writing Contests for children under 12 years old since 2008. The final round is held in New Delhi.

Champak's annual writing and painting competition is called 'Champak Creative Child Contest'.

== See also ==
- Balarama (magazine)
- Tinkle
