= Malarvadi =

Indian children's magazine

- Categories: Children's Magazine; Comic Magazine
- Frequency: Monthly
- Publisher: Islamic Service Trust
- First issue: November 1980
- Final issue: June 2021
- Country: India
- Based in: Kerala
- Language: Malayalam

Malarvadi was an Indian magazine in Malayalam language for children, which was published from November 1981 until June 2021. The magazine was launched with the slogan only good for children with the support of leading literary figures in Malayalam.

== History ==
Malarvadi started its publication in November 1980 with headquarters in Kochi under the Movement of Islam Trust which was functioning as a center at Kodungallur. From 1986, the ownership of the magazine was taken over by Malarwadi Publications Trust and the headquarters was shifted to Thrissur.. The publication was started with the support of leading writers in Malayalam. The magazine managed to reach the forefront of children's publications in Malayalam within a short span of time. Artists like Yesudasan, Seeri, Venu, Shivan, Paul Kallanot and writers like Vaikam Muhammad Basheer, M. T Vasudevan Nair, C. Radhakrishnan, NP Muhammad and Takazhi interacted with the children through Malarvadi. Pattalam Paili, Poocha police (cat police) were some of the notable segments of the Magazine. Kunjunni Mashum Kutyolum (Kunjunni Master and Children) which was handled by poet Kunjunni Mash, was considered one of its key attraction s. A novel by M. T. Vasudevan Nair published in Malarvadi titled 'Daya Enna Nagarika' was later made into a Malayalam movie titled Daya. From 1986, the ownership of the magazine was taken over by Malarvadi Publications Trust and the headquarters was shifted to Thrissur. The publication of Malarvadi was ceased with the June 2021 issue due to crisis caused by COVID-19.
