= Bobanum Moliyum (comics) =

- The English version of the title logo of the Bobanum Moliyum comics

Publication information
- Publisher: Toms Publications (formerly Malayala Manorama and Kalakaumudi)
- First appearance: 1962
- Created by: VT Thomas

Bobanum Moliyum (Malayalam: ബോബനും മോളിയും) are the characters of a political satiric Indian weekly comic series created by VT Thomas (known by the pen name Toms) and is one of the longest uninterruptedly running comic series of the world. It was first published in 1962 and has been in print ever since. Boban and Molly, twin brother and sister from the rural environs of central Travancore became popular in Kerala through the Malayala Manorama weekly, which published the strip for almost four decades. After a controversial legal battle between Malayala Manorama and Thomas, Boban and Molly began to appear as a comic magazine called "Tom's Magazine".

Toms achieved enormous success and fame through Boban and Molly, and became one of the most influential comic artists in Kerala. According to Toms, the prototypes of Boban and Molly were two naughty kids who stayed next door to his ancestral home in Kuttanad. The themes appear in the comics varies from childish adventures and pranks to contemporary social and political satires. The political and social issues are predominantly discussed in the series produced in the later period.

== Characters ==
The setting the series is at the fictional Kizhukkamthookku village in Central Travancore.

=== Boban and Molly ===
The main characters of the series, two 12-year-old twins. They hail from a middle class Christian family in central Travancore. It is known that Toms named Boban and Molly after two children in his neighbourhood who one day came to him and asked him to draw their picture. Toms said: "This took place after these two naughty children thwarted every attempt of mine to prevent them from jumping the fence around my house and walking through the kitchen, on their way to school."

=== Dog of Boban and Molly ===
A little dog owned by the Pothan family, named as Chungan The dog can be seen with the kids in almost every panel.

=== Lawyer Pothan and Marykutty ===
Boban and Molly's parents.

=== Ittunnan Chettan ===
The foolish president of the Kizhukkamthookku gram panchayat.

=== Mariyamma ===
Wife of Ittunnan Chettan, known as "Chettathi".

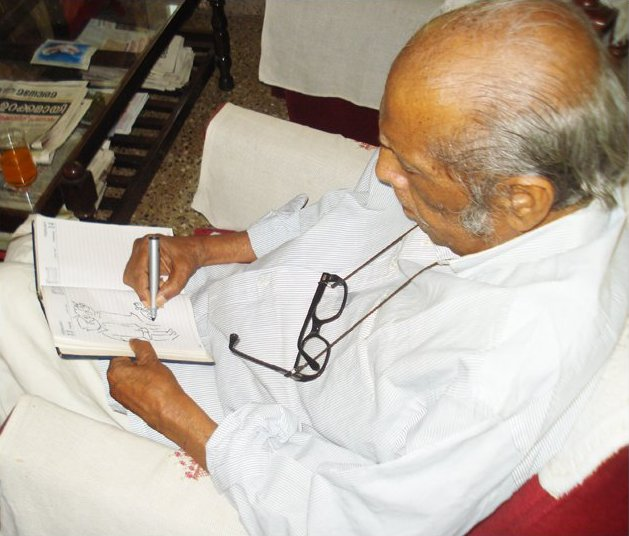
VT Thomas drawing Boban and Molly

=== Ashan ===
The author often uses Ashan to introduce and explain contemporary events and political changes in the society.

=== Unnikkuttan ===
The character is famous for his impish pranks and innocent retorts. The strips generally narrates the mischievous antics of the six-year-old, who constantly puts his parents and teachers in a spot of trouble. "Unnikkuttan is my best-loved character. Though, over the years, I have created many characters, he has remained the most endearing of them all," says Toms, revealing that idea for the character came from his elder daughter Molly's son whose nickname is Unnikkuttan. "My grandson was a prankster, who used to threaten his mother that he would divorce her if she scolded him," recollects artist Toms.

=== Appi the Hippie ===
A hippie in the village ... the romantic guy with a guitar trying to get girls ..

== Legal battle with Malayala Manorama ==
It was only after an infamous legal battle with Malayala Manorama, the "Toms Magazine" came into stands. The controversy became a debating point in the local media and later attracted the attention of the national media.

Toms joined Malayala Manorama, the most popular daily in Kerala, as a cartoonist in 1961, and worked there till retiring as an assistant editor in June 1987. After leaving the Malayala Manorama, he started publishing the strip in the magazine Kalakaumudi, against which the Manorama went to court. A local court temporarily restrained Toms and permitted Manorama to continue publication of the Boban and Molly. However, on an appeal, the High Court of Kerala ruled that pursuant to the Indian Copyright Act, 1957, while the ownership of the strips drawn during Toms’ employment with Manorama would continue to be with the publication, Toms was free to own the characters Boban and Molly and could continue to create cartoon strips featuring them and publish them at his will.

== Cultural impact ==
It is said that Toms even influenced the way a Malayali read a magazine — from back to front— thanks to his strip which appeared in the back pages of the Malayala Manorama weekly.

=== In other media ===
- Bobanum Moliyum, 1971 film adaptation of the comic directed by Sasikumar
- Boban and Molly, a 2006 animated Malayalam film directed by A. K. Saiber.
