= Muthassi (magazine) =

- Categories: Children's magazine
- Frequency: Fortnightly
- Publisher: Kerala Sabdam
- Founder: V. Parameswaran Nair
- First issue: 1980s
- Company: Kerala Sabdam
- Country: India
- Based in: Kollam, Kerala
- Language: Malayalam

Muthassi was a Malayalam children's magazine published from Kollam, Kerala by Kerala Sabdam Ltd.

The magazine was a leading Children's magazine in the 1980s and 1990s but stopped publication in the early 2000s.Muthuchippi was another children's magazine from the same group.
