= Toms (cartoonist) =

Indian cartoonist (1929–2016)

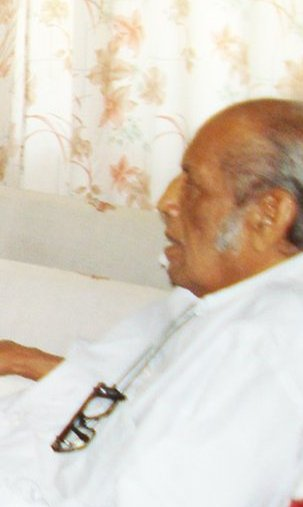
- Born: V. T. Thomas; 6 June 1929; Kuttanad, Kingdom of Travancore, British India (present day Alappuzha, Kerala, India)
- Died: 27 April 2016 (aged 86); Kottayam, Kerala, India
- Education: St. Berchmans College, Changanassery
- Occupation: Cartoonist
- Notable work: Boban and Molly
- Spouse: Thresiakutty
- Children: 6

Vaadakkal Thoppil Thomas (6 June 1929 – 27 April 2016), popularly known as Toms, was an Indian cartoonist from the state of Kerala, who created the cartoon characters Boban and Molly.

== Early life and career ==
Toms was born to Vaadakkal Thoppil Kunjuthomman Kunjithomman and Sicily Thomas on 6 June 1929 in Kuttanad. He completed his graduation from St. Berchmans College, Changanassery. Later he joined the army as an electrician and left the job soon. He then devoted his career completely to drawing cartoons. His elder brother Peter Thomas was his inspiration behind drawings. Peter was a cartoonist at Shankar's Weekly at that time. Toms started his career in 1950 through Sathyadeepam, a Catholic weekly and Kerala Kaumudi. He then joined Malayala Manorama in 1955.

== Boban and Molly ==
Toms created the Malayalam cartoon characters Boban and Molly, the brother sister duos accompanied by a tiny puppy based on two real life persons of the same name. They were two children from his neighborhood and he discovered them in his 30s. Boban and Molly (ബോബനും മോളിയും) first appeared in the cartoon column of Sathyadeepam. Later the characters became more popular through Malayala Manorama. They were first published in 1957. He resigned from Manorama in 1987 and started Toms Publications.

== Other characters created by Toms ==
Toms also created other characters which appeared along with Boban and Molly, which all represented various personalities and life style of Keralites.

- Pothen Vakkeel and Wife- Parents of the kids
- Appy Hippy - The local romoeo
- Ittunnan and Chettathy - Panchayath president and his wife
- Motta - Friend of Boban and Molly
- Unnikkuttan - a naughty kid
- Kunchukuruppu - an intelligent and witty person
- Aasan - A knowledgeable and witty person
- Uppayi Mapla - A village simpleton

== Film adaptation ==
A film Bobanum Moliyum based on the characters was released in 1971 directed by J. Sasikumar, starring Madhu and Kaviyoor Ponnamma. In 2006, an animation film was also released.

== Books ==
Autobiography of Toms, titled Ente Bobanum Molliyum was released on 29 December 2015 by actor Mammootty.

== Personal life ==
Toms was married to Thresiakutty. They have 6 children. Two of them were named Boban and Molly.

== Death ==
He died on 27 April 2016 at SH Medical Centre in Kottayam around 10.45 PM. He was suffering from age related illness.
