= Mathrubhumi =

Indian newspaper

- Type: Daily newspaper
- Format: Broadsheet
- Owner(s): M. V. Shreyams Kumar; Mathrubhumi Printing And Publishing Company Ltd
- Publisher: P. V. Chandran
- Founded: 18 March 1923; 103 years ago
- Language: Malayalam, English (online)
- Headquarters: Kozhikode, Kerala, India
- Circulation: 10,70,215 daily (as of April 2023)
- Website: mathrubhumi.com
- Free online archives: epaper.mathrubhumi.com

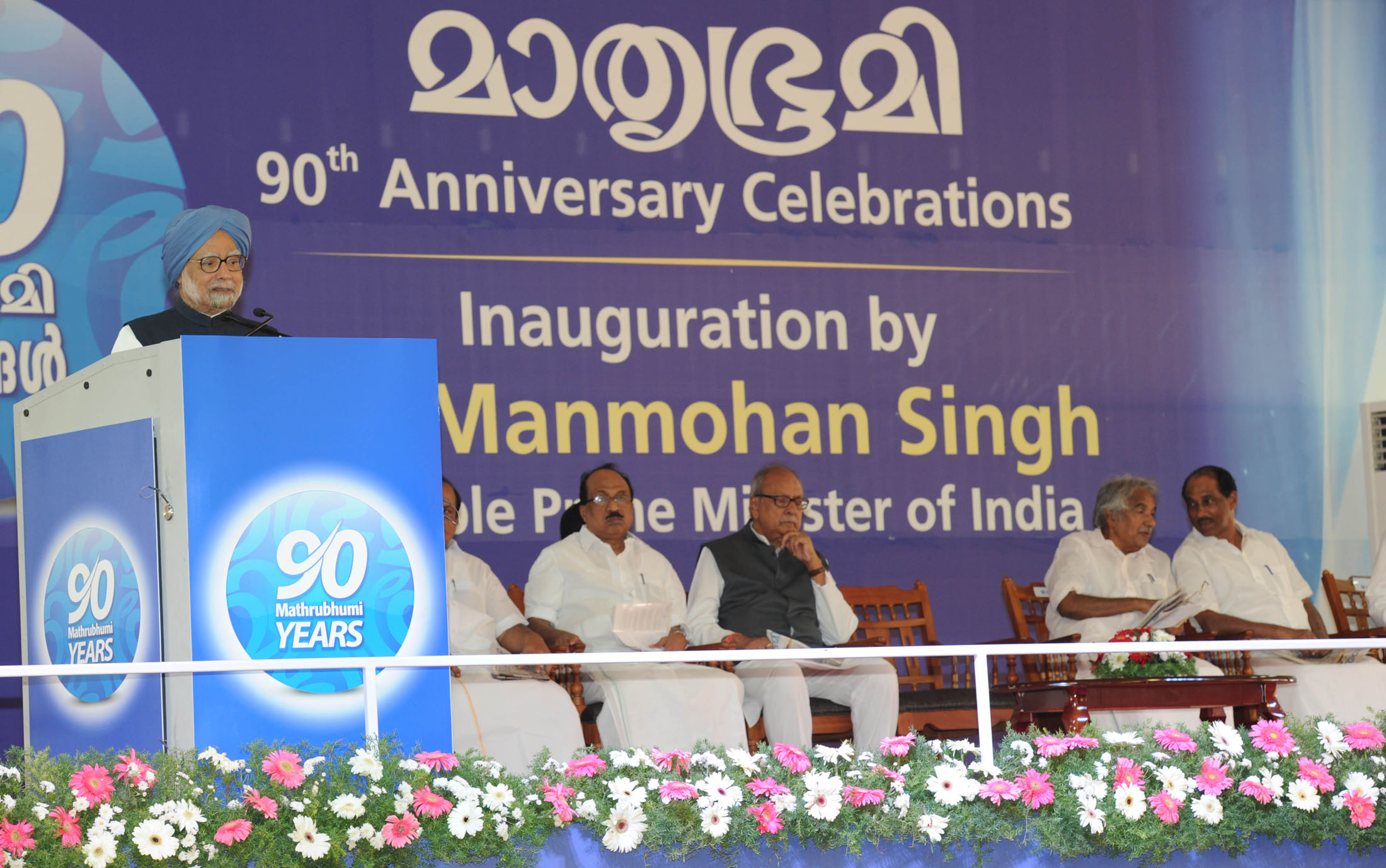
90th anniversary celebrations of Mathrubhumi, Kochi, 2014

Mathrubhumi is a Malayalam newspaper that is published from Kerala, India. It was founded by K. P. Kesava Menon, an active volunteer in the Indian freedom struggle against the British. The word "Mathrubhumi" translates to 'motherland'. It is the second most widely read newspaper daily in Kerala. It publishes a variety of magazines and supplements including the weekly literary magazine, Mathrubhumi Azhchappathippu.

== Ownership and management ==
The Mathrubhumi Printing and Publishing Company Ltd. is a closely held public limited company. While the newspaper was founded by a collective of freedom fighters, the management and majority shareholding have historically been led by the Kumar family.

The Kumar family, descendants of the late M. P. Veerendra Kumar, holds a significant stake in the company. Veerendra Kumar served as the chairman and managing director (CMD) for several decades, overseeing the organization's expansion into television, radio, and book publishing. Following his death in 2020, his son, M. V. Shreyams Kumar, succeeded him as the managing director. The family, based in Wayanad, maintains a prominent role in the strategic and editorial direction of the group's various media verticals.

=== Printing centers ===
The newspaper is published from Kozhikode, Kannur, Malappuram, Palakkad, Thrissur, Kochi, Kottayam, Alappuzha, Kollam, and Thiruvananthapuram.

== Publications ==
- Arogyamasika (health publication)
- Balabhumi (children's publication)
- Cartoon Plus
- Grihalakshmi (women's publication)
- Mathrubhumi Azhchappathippu (illustrated weekly)
- Mathrubhumi Sports Masika (sports publication in Malayalam)
- Mathrubhumi (complete multipurpose portal) (in Malayalam)
- Mathrubhumi Yearbook Plus – Malayalam (in Malayalam)
- Mathrubhumi Yearbook Plus – English (in English)
- Mathrubhumi Yathra (travel magazine)
- Minnaminni (for pre-primary/lower primary children)

== Events ==
Mathrubhumi celebrated its 100th anniversary on 18 March 2023, at the CIAL Convention Centre in Kochi. Kerala Chief Minister Pinarayi Vijayan inaugurated the closing ceremonies, and Union Minister Anurag Singh Thakur unveiled the souvenir.

== See also ==
- List of Malayalam-language newspapers
- Malayalam journalism
- Mathrubhumi News channel
- Mathrubhumi Club FM
- Mathrubhumi Kappa TV
