= Delhi Press =

Indian magazine publisher

Delhi Press (Kala, Kranti, Karmanyata)
- Industry: Publishing and Printing
- Genre: Magazines
- Founded: 1939
- Founder: Vishwa Nath
- Headquarters: New Delhi, India
- Number of locations: Central Delhi and 12 regional offices
- Key people: Nath Family
- Products: Magazines
- Owner: 3 private trusts own all the stakeholding at Delhi Press.
- Number of employees: 600+
- Parent: Vishwa Kala Trust; Purna Kala Trust; Navin Kala Trust
- Website: womansera.com caravanalive.com delhipress.in vishvbook.net

Delhi Press is one of India's largest magazine publishing houses. It publishes 36 magazines in 10 languages, and has a group readership of over 35 million. Some of its popular publications include The Caravan, Champak, Grihshobha, Saras Salil, and Sarita.

== Company ==
The company has its corporate office in central Delhi, and 12 regional offices in the state capitals.

== History ==
Delhi Press was established by Vishwanath (1917-2002) in 1939. The company's first magazine was Caravan in 1940, and its flagship magazine was the Hindi-language Sarita (magazine) launched in 1945. Vishwanath was known for his stable of low-priced magazines that were aimed to the masses, such as Sarita, Saras Salil, Woman's Era, Champak, and Grihshobha.

Vishwanath was a proponent of simple Hindi. Sarita used to have a column "यह किस देश-प्रदेश की भाषा है" which used to present a sample of hard to follow language. The articles and stories in Sarita used to be short and readable.

It is now managed by his descendants, including son Paresh Nath (publisher and editor-in-chief) and grandson Anant Nath (editor of The Caravan). Womans'era, Alive and Suman Saurabh are managed by Divesh Nath (Editor). Related organisations including Pramod Engineering and MassCoMedia were founded by Sh Vishwa Nath's eldest son Naresh Nath and are now run by Divesh Nath and Rohit Nath.

The magazine business has been very challenging in India as well as globally, with many highly regarded magazines such as Dharmayug (1949-1993.), Illustrated Weekly of India (1883-1993), and Life magazine (1883-2000) ceasing publication. However, the Delhi Press magazines have not only survived but thrived, and the group has added new publications. Delhi Press' advertising revenues are 60% and circulation revenues are 40%. Its sales through home delivery exceeds 50%. Magazines sell for Rs 30-60 (about US$0.45 to $0.90), with total revenue about Rs.100 crore (Rs. One Billion).

The Vishv Books division was founded by Vishwanath's son Rakesh Nath. It publishes a variety of books including numerous books written or edited by Rakesh Nath along with books by famous authors such as Tagore, Premchand or Satyabhakta (with expired copyrights). In recent years, his daughter Mudit Mohini has published and authored a large number of popular children's books. These include pop-up books, construction books, books for early learners, "I'm Unique" and graded learning books. She also publishes and manages a complete unit of school curriculum books which are used in Indian as well as International schools. They are exporting a large number of books to various countries as well as selling content rights across the world.

== Controversies ==
Delhi Press, and specially its magazine Sarita has been involved in numerous controversies. Sarita has frequently published articles that are critical of Hindu texts, traditions and institutions. It has been the subjects of many lawsuits and government bans. In practically all cases, the lawsuits and bans have been thrown out in the courts.

A notable controversy arose on the poem "Ram Ka Antardwand" by Arvind kumar which was published in Sarita on July 1957. referring to the banishment of Sita. Arvind Kumar acknowledged that the poem was inspired by Shailendra's song in Awaara (1951) "Pativrta Sitamai Ko Tune Diya Banwas". Acharya Tulsi similarly faced opposition because of his poem "Agnipariksha" in 1970.

Delhi Police filed complaints against Caravan for 'allegedly misleading and providing false information that a farmer died in police firing at the ITO intersection on January 26'.

== Magazine brands ==
- Woman's Era
- Alive (Earlier called Caravan)
- Satyakatha (Hindi)
- Champak (published in 7 Indian languages and English)
- Champakplus (published in English for 4 separate age groups)
- Farm n Food (Hindi)
- Grihsbhobha (published in 7 Indian languages)
- Mukta (Hindi)
- Saras Salil (published in 5 Indian languages)
- Sarita, a Hindi monthly magazine
- Suman Saurabh
- Manohar Kahaniyan (Hindi and Urdu)
- The Caravan, an English-language literary magazine (1940-1988, 2010–present; in 1988, it transformed into Alive. Caravan was reintroduced in 2010; Alive and Caravan are both published today)
- Nimmellara Manasa (Kannada) - (discontinued)
- Butti (Kannada)
- Motoring World
