= Grihshobha =

Indian women's magazine

Grihshobha Ab
- June 2012 cover of Grihshobha
- Categories: Women'a magazines
- Frequency: Bi-weekly
- Publisher: Delhi Press
- Founded: 1979
- Company: Delhi Press
- Country: India
- Based in: New Delhi
- Language: 8
- Website: Grihshobha

Grihshobha is a biweekly magazine aimed at Indian woman.

== History and profile ==
Grihshobha was started in 1979 as a monthly by the Delhi Press Group. Since its inception, Grihshobha has enjoyed wide readership in the Hindi belt of the country. The headquarters is in New Delhi. The magazine focuses on women's issues, and often features racy short stories, fashion, recipes, advice columns, and comments on socialites and current events. It carries features on housekeeping, cookery, knitting, interior decoration, beauty care, dress designing, hobbies and handicraft, besides helping women understand social, national as well as universal issues.

Grihshobha initially began in Hindi but later expanded to include editions in other languages such as Bangla, Gujarati, Kannada, Malayalam, Marathi, Tamil, and Telugu. Between July and December 2000 Grihshobha was the second best-selling women's magazine in India with a circulation of 3,333,651 copies.
