= Kanyaka (magazine) =

Indian magazine

October 2011 cover of Kanyaka

Kanyaka is an Indian Malayalam-language magazine primarily aimed at women. It is published fortnightly by Mangalam Publications, a publishing company based in Kottayam. The chief editor is Claramma Varghese, and the managing editor is Toshma Biju Varghese. Sajil Sreedhar is the editor-in-chief. The magazine's headquarters are in Mumbai, Maharashtra.

It includes current affairs, stories, poems, cartoons, interviews with celebrities and uncelebrated common personalities.
