= Kalakaumudi =

Indian Malayalam news magazine

- Chief Editor: M.S. Mani
- Editor: Sukumaran Mani
- Executive Editor: Prasad Laxman
- Categories: Illustrated periodical
- Frequency: Weekly
- Founder: K. Sukumaran
- Founded: 1975
- Company: Kalakaumudi Publications Pvt. Ltd.
- Country: India
- Based in: Thiruvananthapuram, Kerala
- Language: Malayalam
- Website: kalakaumudi.com

Kalakaumudi is an illustrated weekly news magazine published in Malayalam language from Kerala, India. It is printed in Thiruvananthapuram and distributed throughout Kerala by Kalakaumudi Publications Pvt. Ltd. Kalakaumudi was launched in 1975 by M. S. Mani, the eldest son of K. Sukumaran, founder-editor of Kerala Kaumudi Daily. Kalakaumudi was a by-product of the emergency-call by late Prime Minister Indira Gandhi in 1975.

The group also publishes several other magazines namely Vellinakshatram, Ayurarogyam, Muhoortham, Priya Snehitha, Kadha, Big News Mid Day from Trivandrum, Kollam, Kochi and Kozhikode, Kalakaumudi daily, the oldest Malayalam daily from Mumbai, Ente Bhavanam, Trial etc. The same group once published Film magazine and Neelambari.

The Group was founded in 1975 by K. Sukumaran.
