= Malayalam journalism =

Malayalam-language journalism of India

Malayalam journalism encompasses journalism published and broadcast in the Malayalam language. Modern Malayalam journalism can be traced to the publication of the Raajyasamaachaaram and the Pashchimodhayam under the direction of Hermann Gundert in June 1847. Kerala has the highest media exposure in India with newspapers publishing in nine languages, mainly English and Malayalam.

== History ==
Rajyasamacharam, published from Tellicherry and edited by Hermann Gundert was the first Malayalam journal. It started publication in June 1847 and closed down in 1850. Paschimodayam, the second journal in Malayalam, was also published from Tellicherry and circulated between October 1847 and June 1857. Both journals were published by the Basel Mission Society and were aimed at propagating Christian religious values and teachings. Many other early Malayalam newspapers were also published by Christian missionaries. The list includes Njananikshepam which was published by the Church Mission Society in Kottayam from November 1848; Vidyasamgraham which was an educational publication of the Kottayam CMS College first published in 1864; Satyanada Kahalam which was a Catholic newspaper that started in 1876; Keralopakari which was published by the Basel Mission Society from 1878; and Nasrani Deepika which started publication in 1887. Satyanada Kahalam continued in existence till 1999 in the form of Kerala Times, to which it had merged in 1970. Nasrani Deepika, which became Deepika in 1939 remains the oldest Malayalam newspaper still in circulation. Other early Malayalam newspapers include Malayala Manorama, Malayali, Western Star and Kerala Tharaka in Travancore, Kerala Mithram and Satyanadam in Cochin and Kerala Pathrika and Kerala Sanchari in Malabar. Chengalathu Kunhirama Menon and Kandathil Varghese Mappila are considered the pioneers of Malayalam journalism in Malabar and Travancore respectively.

== Newspapers ==
=== Defunct Malayalam newspapers ===
While long out of print, these newspapers played crucial roles in the public life of Kerala during periods of political unease by vocalizing citizen dissent, and by subsequently influencing public opinion. Despite their historical and cultural significance, many of these publications were forced to close following pressure from local authorities. Some of their names survive as sobriquets of their primary editors.

- Al Ameen (edited and published by Mohammed Abdul Rahiman; 1929–1939)
- Bharath Vilasam
- Deenabandhu (edited by V. R. Krishnan Ezhuthachan; 1941 - 1962)
- Kerala Janatha (edited by Pattom A. Thanu Pillai and K. Krishna Pillai, estd. 1957)
- Kerala Mithram (edited by Kandathil Varghese Mappila and published by Devji Bhimji)
- Kerala Pathrika (edited by Chengalathu Kunhirama Menon)
- Kerala Sanchari (edited by Vengayil Kunhiraman Nayanar, otherwise known as Kesari, and published by the Spectator Press, Calicut)
- Kerala Tribune (Mathews.K.Lukose Poriyakal Ayoor)
- Kerala Times (Owned by Kerala Cultural Society under the Arch Diocese of Verapoly)
- Kesari (edited by Kesari Balakrishna Pillai)
- Malabar Mail (edited by Fr. Thomas Veluthedathu and M. M. Varkey, and published by Mar Augustine Kandathil)
- Malayala Rajyam (edited by K. G. Shankar; 1929-late 1960s)
- Mithavadi (edited by Moorkkoththu Kumaran and later by C. Krishnan)
- Paschimodayam (Hermann Gundert; estd. 1847)
- Prabhatham (edited by E. M. S. Namboodiripad)
- Prathibhavam (edited by Sathish Kalathil)
- People Tribune (edited by Mathews K. Lukose)
- Powradhwani (edited by Aniyan Athikayam; 1932–2003)
- Rajyasamacharam (Hermann Gundert; 1847–1850)
- Sahodaran (edited by Sahodaran Ayyappan)
- Swadeshabhimani (edited by Swadeshabhimani Ramakrishna Pillai and published by Vakkom Abdul Khadir Moulavi)
- Thejas (edited by P. Koya)

=== Current Malayalam newspapers ===
- Chandrika founded by Indian Union Muslim League
- Deepika (founded and edited initially by Nidhiry Mani Kathanar and currently run by Catholic church)
- Deshabhimani (owned by Communist Party of India (Marxist)
- General (founded in 1976, From Thrissur, Kerala)
- Janayugom (founded by Communist Party of India)
- Janmabhumi edited by T. Arun Kumar
- Kerala Kaumudi (founded and edited initially by C. V. Kunhiraman)
- Madhyamam (founded by the Ideal Publications Trust and edited initially by P. K. Balakrishnan and K. A. Kodungallur)
- Mathrubhumi (founded and edited initially by K. P. Kesava Menon)
- Malayala Manorama (founded and edited initially by Kandathil Varghese Mappila Established in 1888)
- Mangalam (founded by M. C. Varghese)
- Siraj (founded in 1984 at Caliut)
- Suprabhaatham (founded in 2014 by Iqra' publications with headquarters in Kozhikode)
- Udaya Keralam (founded and edited initially by Vishnu S Ambadi)
- Varthamanam
- Veekshanam (edited by K. L. Mohana Varma)

== Journals ==
- Madhyamam weekly , Chief Editor: O. Abdurahman
- Mathrubhumi Weekly, Editor-in-charge: M. P. Gopinath
- Chintha Varika , Chief Editor: C. P. Narayanan
- Bhashaposhini Monthly
- Deshabhimani Weekly which was edited by Thayattu Shankaran and M.N. Vijayan
- Grihalakshmi (Edited by K. K. Sreedharan Nair)
- Samakalika Malayalam Vaarika edited by Saji James
- Kala Kaumudi ( Founded by M.S.Mani)
- Yojana (Malayalam) Published by Sales Emporium, Publications Division, Trivandrum
- Kesari , RSS Malayalam Mouthpiece.
- Chandrika ( Founded by Musthafa)
- Thejas (founded by Inter Media Publishing Ltd and edited by Prof. P Koya)
- Prabodhanam Edited by T.K. Abdullah
- Al Irfad
- Sunni Voice
- Janashakthi Weekly
- Flash Movies
- Arogyapadmam Family Health Magazine from Santhigiri Ashram - Associate Editor: T Sasi Mohan
- Santhigiri Spiritual Magazine from Santhigiri Ashram, Thiruvananthapuram

== Television age ==
Television broadcasting in the Malayalam tongue began 1985 with the beginning of Doordarshan telecasting.

=== Doordarshan ===
One of Doordarshan's first services was the broadcasting of regular news bulletins. Since its inception, the organisation has become one of the largest television broadcasting entities in the world in terms of integrated studio and transmitter infrastructure.

=== Manorama News ===
In 2006, Manorama News was started with the help of strong backup of Malayala Manorama daily. With Shani Prabhakaran and Nisha Purushothaman as anchors and Johney Lukose, K. P. Jayadeep and Romi Mathew as leading members, on the very first year itself this TV channel achieved the news TAM rating leading position.

=== Amrita T V ===
Amrita TV, launched in 2005, as a 24-hour Malayalam, general entertainment satellite channel. The theme song, Lokasamastha was composed by Rahulraj. It was composed in 2003, for Mata Amritanandamayi's 50th birthday celebrated, and later taken as the theme of Amrita TV. Amrita TV's global footprint currently covers, beside India, Asia, Middle East, America, Australia and Europe. Amrita TV is a Free to air channel having its official broadcast through (C-Band) INSAT 2E satellite at 83 ° East. Also accessible on internet and similar platforms.

=== NTV ===
NTV is a Malayalam production house founded by the Kerala production house. Since its founding over two decades ago, NTV has functioned as a major producer and broadcaster of Malayalam programmes. The name NTV has largely grown synonymous with major Malayalam telecasting. Serving all Malayalam channels including the state owned Dooradarshan, NTV continues to direct and produce a wide array of Malayalam-language programmes.

The company was founded by Mr. Leen B Jesmas and Mr. Elias John in the year 1992. With the emergence of the satellite channels NTV made a break through by producing some of the most popular current affairs programmes on mini screen like 'Kannadi', 'Jalakam','Aniyara', Saakshi, Vicharana. The creators of this quality programmes won 10 Kerala state Awards and many other recognitions.

In 2009, NTV started a regional channel in UAE called NTV UAE, which has been a springboard for all Malayalam channels launched to date. Nikhil Raj Natarajan was the CEO of the channel from 2009 to 2013. His show, the PRIME TIME UAE, was very popular in UAE. Later, he moved to Flowers TV and 24 News channel as Digital Head in the period 2015–2017. NTV has been the major provider of basic archival content for television, which was a major source for popularising television channels. The channel was launched in June 2009 as the only regional Malayalam channel of UAE. It is there in all the major packages of E-vision, including the basic, E-life, and E- Pehla. NTV programming covers a range of genres, including news, current affairs, entertainment, lifestyle, culture, and movies.

=== MediaOne TV ===
MediaOne TV is a Malayalam television channel under Madhyamam Broadcasting Limited from Madhyamam family. Mediaone broadcast programmes from its main studio unit located at Kozhikode. Dr. K.Yaseen Ashraf is the managing director. Pramod Raman is The chief Editor . Media One started its second channel Media One Gulf exclusively for Kerala Gulf diaspora headquartered at Dubai

=== Asianet ===
Asianet was the first Malayalam TV Channel in private sector. Asianet started by Sashikumar, a famous left minded media person, in 1990 with his NRI uncle Reji Menon as main investor. They started their news bulletins in 1994. It was a turning point in the history of Malayalam journalism. The news persons behind this initiative were B. R. P. Bhaskar, T. N. Gopakumar, Neelan, K. Jayachandran, N. P. Chandrasekharan, K. Rajagopal, C. L. Thomas, N. K. Raveendran, S.Biju, Raju Raphael and Anil Adoor. This channel became the nursery of Television Journalism in Malayalam. The founding leaders of some of the news channels of Kerala were the products of Asianet like M. V. Nikesh Kumar (Indiavision), N. P. Chandrasekharan (People) and K. P. Jayadeep (Manorama News). Later Sashikumar was driven out of the channel when it became pro CPM. The full ownership gone to Raji Menon who was the real owner. Later the channel was taken over by the Rajeev Chandrasekhar's group. At present the world media baron Rupert Murdoch is the owner of Asianet channels except Asianet news. UPA governments' foreign direct investment policy in press helped him for take over.

=== Indiavision ===
Indiavision was the first full-fledged news channel started in Malayalam. It started functioning in 2003 August by M. K. Muneer and M. T. Vasudevan Nair. The leaders of the channel were Mr. M. V. Nikesh Kumar (Executive Editor), N.P. Chandrasekharan (Associate Editor) and A. Sahadevan (Programme Consultant). The channel closed due to financial issues in April 2015

=== Janam TV ===
Janam TV is a popular Malayalam Television news and entertainment channel which was launched on 19 April 2015. It is the first channel in Malayalam using most modern technology broadcasting in high-definition mode. It is operated by Janam Multimedia Ltd with more than 5,000 shareholders and its stated aim is to "promote national interest".

=== Kairali TV ===
Kairali TV is a Malayalam television channel. It is the first public limited channel promoted by Malayalam Communications. Currently, Mammootty, film actor in Malayalam, holds the post of chairman. Other important leaders are: D Prabha Varma- Director, News and Current Affairs, N. P, Chandrasekharan- Executive Editor, Somakumar- Executive Producer and Abraham Mathew- Chief Correspondent. In 2005, a news channel People TV was launched by Kairali TV.

The HQ and studio of the channel is at East Fort, Thiruvananthapuram (Trivandrum). It has a transmission centre at Ernakulam too. A state-of-the-art HQ was constructed in Trivandrum as the Communist Marxists got rule of the State .

People TV is another channel owned by Kairali, that caters news and current affairs round the clock. WE TV, a channel for the youth has started transmission on April 14 of 2007.

=== Jeevan TV ===
Jeevan TV is a 24-hour Malayalam television channel, with its headquarters at Palarivattom, Kochi, India. It uses the slogan "The complete family channel". Further it is a semi news channel. It is promoted by the Catholic Church of Kerala although the journalists working there came from Chenkottukonam Swami's Punyabhumi. Mar Andrews Thazhath, Metropolitan Arch Bishop of Trichur is the chairman of this channel. Currently Baby Mathew Somatheeram is the managing director. Other important leaders are: Isac Joseph-Working Chairman, PJ Antony-Executive Editor, Dr Biju Alappatt-Chief Co-ordinator, MS Banesh-News Editor, Babu Velappaya-News Editor, Jeevan TV, was established in the year 2002.This well known television channel is one such channel aired for the Malayalam- speaking viewers that caters to the interest of an entire family.

=== JaiHind TV ===
JaiHind TV is the general entertainment channel in Kerala, Controlled by Indian National Congress broadcasting from Thiruvananthapuram in Kerala . This channel was started by Sunnykutty Abraham a veteran Journalist and political analyst who left Mathrubhumi newspaper. Sunnykutty Abraham was the Chief Editor and Chief Operating Officer (COO) when the channel went on air. It is a 24-hour channel with entertainment and news. K.P.Mohanan is the chief executive officer(CEO) of the channel.

=== Reporter TV ===
Reporter TV is a television news channel broadcasting in the Malayalam language catering to the Malayalam speaking population in Kerala as well as abroad.M V Nikesh Kumar, a popular media person in Kerala, India is the CEO of Reporter TV

=== Shekinah TV ===
Shekinah TV is a 24-hour Indian satellite News channel, airing Christian spiritual programs, current affairs and news. The channel airs programs in Malayalam and English. The channel is managed by Shekinah Communications Limited. Available in Airtel Dth channel no 859, Tata Play Dth channel no 1856. The channel is headquartered in Thalikode, Thrissur, Kerala, India.

=== Shalom Television ===
Shalom Television is a Christian television channel. Shalom television broadcasts Christian programming in the Asia, UK, Europe and the US. Shalom is a non-profit organisation with publications; Shalom Times, Shalom Tidings and Sunday Shalom. Shalom TV India has associate itself with Eternal Word Television Network, transmitting programming 24 hours a day to 105 million homes in 110 countries and 16 territories on more than 3,400 cable systems, wireless cable, Direct Broadcast Satellite (DBS), low power TV and individual satellite users.

=== Goodness Television ===
Goodness Television is a Christian television channel run by Divine Retreat Centre, Potta. Goodness TV India broadcasts Christian programming in the Asia, UK, Europe and the US.

== Online journals ==
In the late 1990s, some newspapers started making their print news accessible online. Online news websites started to emerge in the early 2000s, with Malayalam.indiainfo.com. which was started in April 2000 and later renamed to thatsmalayalam.com, and weblokam.com (renamed to mayalam.webdunia.com) which was founded in September 2000.

- oneindia.com (founded in 2006 by BG Mahesh)
- Pravasi Express (founded in 2012 by Pravasi Publications and edited by Rajesh Kumar)
- Thejas (defunct printed newspaper, established in 2006. Online newspaper started from 2019.)

== Online TV ==
Drishyam TV, the first free Malayalam television channel on the internet started in 2005.

== Malayalam internet radio networks ==
Radio Dum Dum which is conferred as the first Malayalam internet radio actively promotes Malayalam news, songs and programmes worldwide.
