= List of Malayalam-language newspapers =

Part of a series on

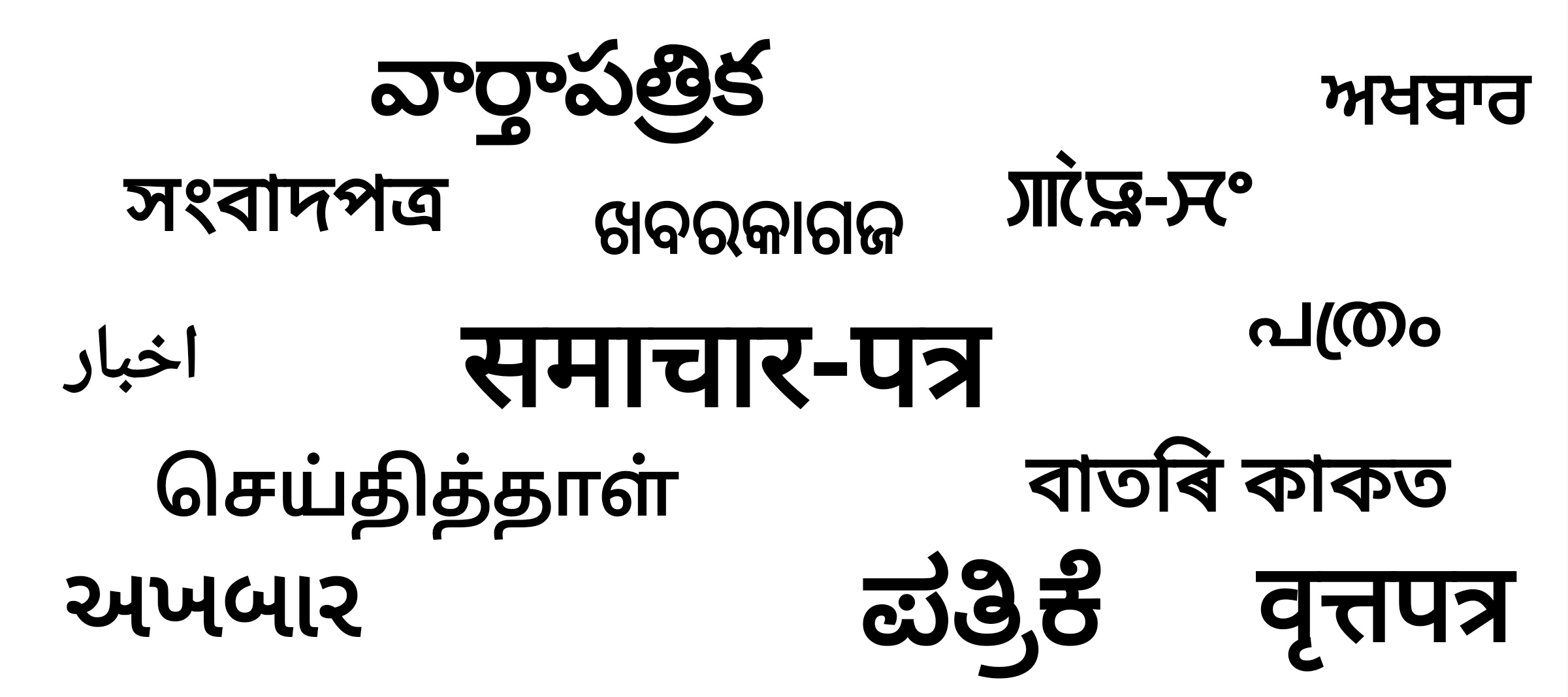

Newspapers of India
Category
Newspapers by languages
- Assamese
- Bengali
- Gujarati
- Hindi
- Kannada
- Malayalam
- Marathi
- Meitei (Manipuri)
- Punjabi
- Tamil
- Telugu
Related
- Newspapers by readership
- Registrar of Newspapers for India
- The Indian Newspaper Society

Rajyasamacharam was the first newspaper in Malayalam. This was started by Hermann Gundert under the Christian missionaries of Basel Mission in June 1847 from Illikkunnu in Thalassery. Pashchimodayam was the second newspaper in Malayalam. It started in October 1847 from Thalassery. Deepika, the oldest Malayalam newspaper now in circulation, was established in 1887. Malayala Manorama, Mathrubhumi, Madhyamam, Deshabhimani, Janayugom, Siraj Daily, Suprabhaatham, Janmabhumi, Chandrika, Kerala Kaumudi, General, Veekshanam, Madhyamam and Varthamanam are major newspapers in Malayalam. Malayala Manorama holds the record for the largest-selling regional language newspaper in India. It is also the 11th most circulating newspaper in the world.

== List of newspapers (in circulation) ==
=== Morning dailies ===
No	Name	Areas of publication	Established
1	Aksharanadam	Kottayam	1995
2	Chandrika	Kannur, Malappuram, Kochi, Thiruvananthapuram, Kottayam, Kozhikode, Doha, Dubai, Riyadh, Jeddah, Dammam, Bahrain	1934
3	Deepika	Kottayam, Kochi, Kannur, Thrissur, Thiruvananthapuram, Kozhikode	1887
4	Deshabhimani	Kannur, Malappuram, Thiruvananthapuram, Kottayam, Thrissur, Kochi, Kozhikode, Bangalore, Bahrain, Kollam, Palakkad	1942
5	Janayugom	Thiruvananthapuram, Kochi, Kozhikode, Kannur, Kollam	1953
6	Janmabhumi	Kochi, Kottayam, Kannur, Thrissur, Thiruvananthapuram, Kozhikode, Bangalore, Kollam, Pathanamthitta	1977
7	Kerala Kaumudi	Thiruvananthapuram, Kollam, Alappuzha, Kottayam, Kochi, Thrissur, Kozhikode, Kannur, Bangalore	1911
8	Malayala Manorama	Kottayam, Kozhikode, Kochi, Thiruvananthapuram, Palakkad, Kannur, Kollam, Thrissur, Malappuram, Pathanamthitta, Alappuzha, Chennai, Bangalore, Delhi, Mangalore, Bahrain, Dubai	1888
9	Mangalam	Kottayam, Kozhikode, Kochi, Thiruvananthapuram, Thrissur, Idukki, Kannur	1969
10	Mathrubhumi	Kozhikode, Kochi, Thiruvananthapuram, Kottayam, Palakkad, Kannur, Kollam, Thrissur, Malappuram, Alappuzha, Chennai, Mumbai, Bangalore, Delhi, Bahrain	1923
11	Madhyamam	Kochi, Thiruvananthapuram, Kannur, Malappuram, Kottayam, Thrissur, Kozhikode, Bangalore, Mangalore, Mumbai, Bahrain, Dubai, Qatar, Kuwait, Jeddah, Riyadh, Dammam, Abha, Oman	1987
12	Siraj	Thiruvananthapuram, Kochi, Kannur, Kozhikode	1984
13	Suprabhaatham	Kozhikode, Thiruvananthapuram, Kochi, Kannur, Malappuram, Thrissur, Palakkad	2014
14	Varthamanam	Kozhikode, Thiruvananthapuram, Kochi, Malappuram, Doha	2003
15	Veekshanam	Thiruvananthapuram, Kochi, Kannur, Thrissur, Kozhikode, Kollam	1976
16	Metro Vaartha	Kochi, Thiruvananthapuram, Kozhikode, Thrissur, Alappuzha, Bhopal, Indore	2008

=== Evening dailies ===
No	Name	Areas of publication	Established
1	General	Thrissur	1976
2	Kerala Kaumudi Flash	Thiruvananthapuram, Kollam, Alappuzha, Kottayam, Kochi, Thrissur, Kozhikode, Kannur, Malappuram	2006
3	Venad Pathrika	Thiruvananthapuram	1090

== List of newspapers (defunct) ==
- Al Ameen (edited and published by Mohammed Abdur Rahiman; 1929-1939)
- Deenabandhu (edited by V. R. Krishnan Ezhuthachan; 1941 - 1962)
- Kerala Janatha (edited by Pattom A. Thanu Pillai and K. Krishna Pillai, estd. 1957)
- Kerala Mithram (edited by Kandathil Varghese Mappila and published by Devji Bhimji)
- Kerala Pathrika (edited by Chengalathu Kunhirama Menon; estd. 1885)
- Kerala Sanchari (edited by Vengayil Kunhiraman Nayanar
- Kesari (edited by Kesari Balakrishna Pillai)
- Malayala Rajyam (edited by K. G. Shankar; estd. 1929)
- Mithavadi (edited by Moorkoth Kumaran, Mithavaadi Krishnan; estd. 1907)
- Paschimodayam (Hermann Gundert; estd. 1847)
- Prabhatham (edited by E. M. S. Namboodiripad)
- Prathibhavam (edited by Sathish Kalathil)
- Rajyasamacharam (Hermann Gundert; 1847-1850)
- Sahodaran (edited by Sahodaran Ayyappan)
- Swadeshabhimani (edited by Swadeshabhimani Ramakrishna Pillai and published by Vakkom Moulavi)
- Thejas (edited by P. Koya)

== List of Online journals ==
- oneindia.com (founded in 2006 by BG Mahesh)
- Pravasi Express (founded in 2012 by Pravasi Publications and edited by Rajesh Kumar)
- Thejas (defunct printed newspaper, established in 2006. Online newspaper started from 2019.)

== See also ==
- List of Malayalam-language periodicals
- List of newspapers in India
- List of newspapers by circulation
