= Gundert Museum =

Heritage museum in Kerala

Hermann Gundert Museum
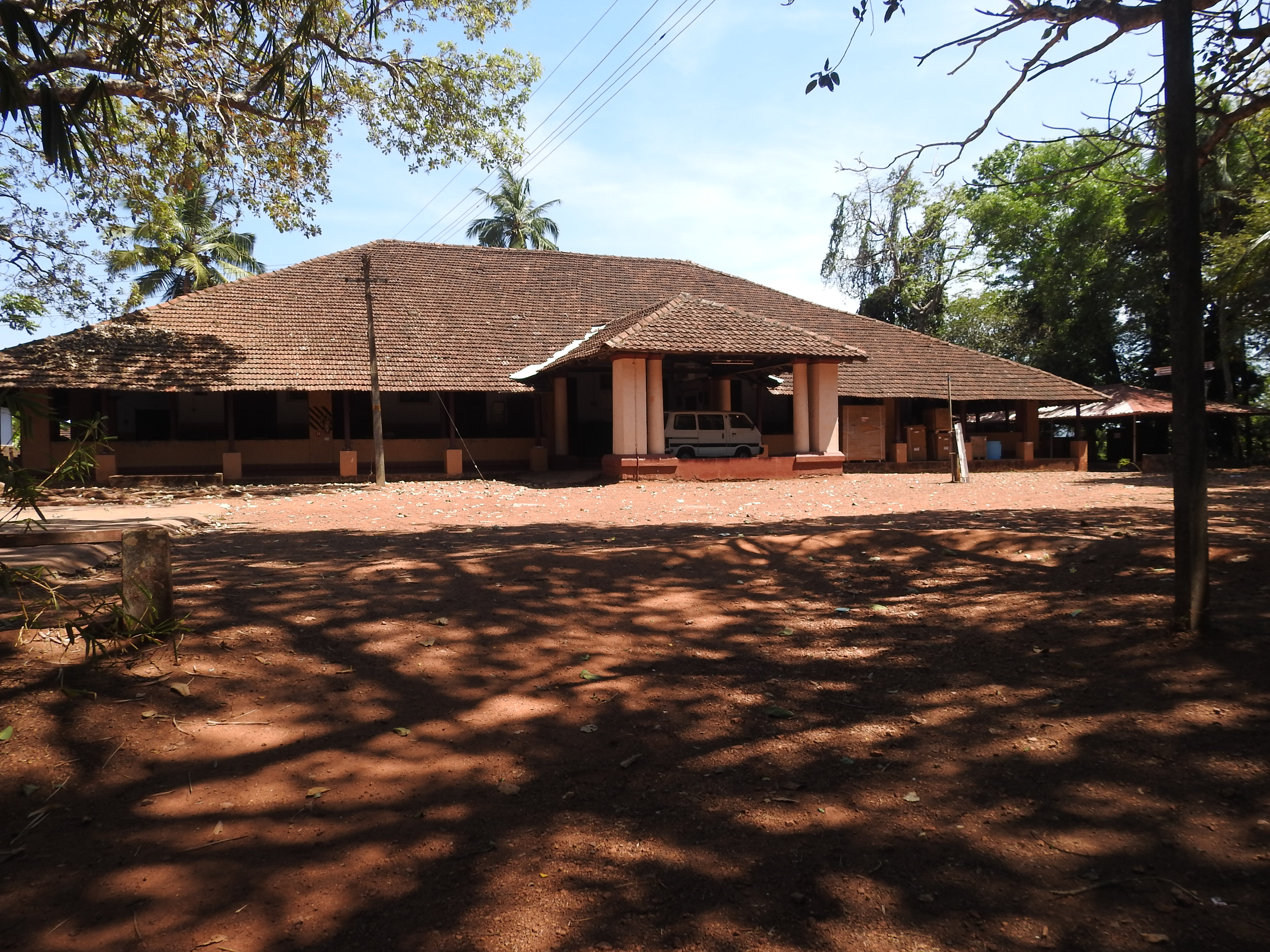
- Hermann Gundert Museum
- Established: 7 May 2022
- Location: Thalassery, Kerala
- Coordinates: 11.7678°N 75.4807°E
- Owner: Government of Kerala

Gundert Museum is a heritage museum located at Thalassery, Kerala. It was originally the residence of Hermann Gundert, a German missionary who is remembered for his contributions to the Malayalam language. It was known as Gundert Bungalow before turning into a museum and was constructed in the 1800s. In 2022, it was converted into a museum by the Kerala Government as a tribute to Gundert. It was from this bungalow that Gundert published the first language dictionary in Malayalam and the first Malayalam daily Rajyasamacharam and Paschimdodayam. The museum houses the Hermann Hesse Library, a collection of rare books, the Julie Gundert Hall, the Gundert Statue and the Digital Book Archive.

== Overview ==
Gundert Bungalow was the residence of Hermann Gundert, who lived in Thalassery for 20 years. A German missionary, scholar and linguist, he came to Thalassery in 1839 and continued to live and work there with his wife Julie for 20 years . Ill health forced him to return to Germany in 1859.

Gundert Bungalow is a heritage building. Its construction is in orthodox Kerala architectural style. It has tiled roof and large verandahs which run along all four sides. It has wooden doors and windows. The craftsmen have used laterite stones and red clay roof tiles. Kuyyali River flows close to Gundert Bungalow.

In the museum, Gundert's life story is told through descriptions. It was renovated into a museum at a cost of Rs 2.21 crore and was opened to public on 7 May 2022. The renovation work was completed under the Thalassery Heritage Tourism Project.
