= Pravasi Express Awards =

Singaporean award

- Pravasi Express Award in 2013
- Awarded for: Excellence in Community Service & Arts
- Country: Singapore
- Presented by: Pravasi Publications
- First award: 2013

Pravasi Express Awards were introduced in 2013 for appreciating personalities for outstanding contributions to society and endeavours in their chosen field/profession. The awards are overseen by Pravasi Publications from Singapore, publishers of the Pravasi Express Newspaper.

== History ==
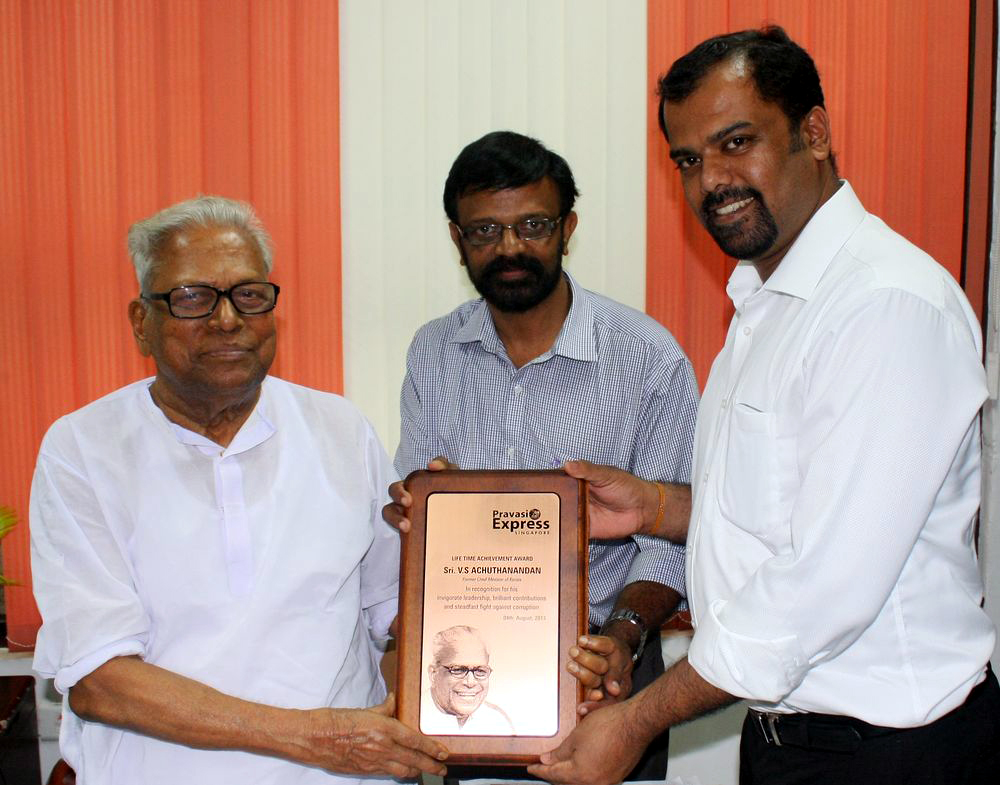
Pravasi Express Chief Editor RajeshKumar presenting " Lifetime Achievement Award 2013" to V. S. Achuthanandan

The first Pravasi Express Awards were presented on 4 August 2013 in a public function at Spring Auditorium, Singapore with over 400 guests. The Former Chief Minister of Kerala V. S. Achuthanandan was awarded the first Pravasi Express "Life Achievement Award" in the ceremony. The award ceremony was presided over by Ambassador-at-Large Gopinatha Pillai with the presence of Malayalam Lyrist Anil Panachooran and actor Unni Mukundan.

The second edition of Pravasi Express Awards were presented during the third anniversary celebration of Pravasi Express held on 5 July 2014 at Nexus Auditorium, Singapore. The awards ceremony was presided over by Ambassador-at-Large Gopinatha Pillai and singer Jayachandran was awarded the "Life Achievement Award" for his contribution to music. National Award winner Priyamani received the "Youth Icon Award". There were musical performances from Jayachandran, Chandralekha, Ragesh Brahmanandan and Snehaja.

== Awards ==
Pravasi Express awards are given to Indians from different part of the world, to honor their contributions to society and endeavours in their chosen field/profession. The awards cover different categories including social commitment, business excellence, contribution to Malayalee diaspora, arts and also to appreciate the emerging champions in all the categories.

=== 2020 Awards ===
Pravasi Express Awards 2020 were awarded in a virtual event held on 18 July 2020. T.P Sreenivasan, former IFS Official and Ambassador was awarded the Malayalee Ratna Award. He has served as secretary of legation in Tokyo, Thimphu, Moscow. He has also served as a permanent representative of India to the United Nations. PE Life Time Achievement Award was presented to the renowned dancer, founder and chief mentor / trainer of Baskar's Academy - Mrs Santha Bhaskar for her six-long decade's significant contribution in the field of music and dance. Young talented actor Tovino Thomas was awarded the Youth icon award and the award event was followed by musical performance from Harish Sivaramakrishnan.

PE Malayalee Ratna Award	T.P Sreenivasan, Former IFS Official and Ambassador
PE Life Time Achievement Award	Santha Bhaskar, Renowned dancer
PE Youth Icon Award	Tovino Thomas, Actor
PE Social Excellence Award	Shaji Philip, Philanthropist
PE Young Entrepreneur Award	Anes M.K.

=== 2019 Awards ===
Pravasi Express Awards 2019 were awarded in Pravasi Express Nite 2019 held at Shine Auditorium, Singapore with the presence of Ambassador-at-Large Gopinatha Pillai, Dr. V.P. Nair, Pravasi Express Chief Editor Mr.Rajesh Kumar, Chengannur MLA Saji Cherian and Singapore Kairali Kala Nilayam secretary Mr.Basil Baby.

Poet and activist Sugathakumari was honored with the Pravasi Express Lifetime Achievement Award for her contribution to Malayalam Literature. Award night was followed by a musical performance from Shahabaz Aman and dance performance by Film actor Arya Rohit. Malayalam comedy actor Ullas Pandalam and team also entertained the guests.

Award night also witnessed the inauguration of Singapore Kairali Film Forum (SKFF) by Singapore Film director K. Rajagopal which was followed by the screening of the first micro film from SKFF Godfather.

PE Lifetime Achievement Award	Sugathakumari, poet and activist
PE Music Excellence Award	Shahabaz Aman, playback singer and composer
PE BusinessExcellence Award	Joy Allukas
PE Social Excellence Award	Saji Cherian, politician
PE Vanitha Ratnam Award	Dr. Lissy Shajahan
PE Art and Culture Excellence Award	Dr. Chitra Krishnakumar
PE Sports Excellence Award	Rahul K Raju

=== 2018 Awards ===
Pravasi Express Awards 2018 were awarded in Pravasi Express Nite 2018 held at Kallang Theatre, Singapore with the presence of Mr. Lee Hong Chuang BBM, Advisor Hougang Grassroot Organisation, Ambassador-at-Large Gopinatha Pillai, Pravasi Express Chief Editor Mr.Rajesh Kumar, National Film Award playback singer Ms.Vani Jayaram and Singapore Kairali Kala Nilayam secretary Mr.Basil Baby.

Veteran Playback Singer Vani Jayaram was awarded the Pravasi Express Lifetime Achievement Award for her contribution to Indian film industry and Malayalam film actor Suraj Venjaramood was awarded with Pravasi Express acting Excellence Award for his contribution to Malayalam film industry . Award night was followed by music from Vani Jayaram and actor Suraj Venjaramood entertained the crowd. Abhijeet Kollam, Vaishnav Girish and Praseeda also sang.

PE Lifetime Achievement Award	Vani Jairam, playback singer
PE Acting Excellence Award	Suraj Venjaramood, film actor
PE Youth Icon Award	Aishwarya Lekshmi, film actress
PE Vanitha Ratnam Award	Annie Libu
PE BusinessExcellence Award	Shera Thampi, Dowser Group
PE BusinessExcellence Award	Phillip Michael, Y Axis
PE BusinessExcellence Award	Prabhiraj Natarajan, Aris Group
PE Art and Culture Excellence Award	MM Dollah
PE Social Excellence Award	C M Ashhraf Ali, Malaysia
PE Award for Best Singer	Abhijith Kollam

==== Special Categories ====
Other honorable award recipients were Jaleela Niaz (PE Special Awards - Excellence in Visual Arts) and Hema Malini (PE Special Awards - Excellence in Art and Culture).

=== 2017 Awards ===
Pravasi Express Awards 2017 took place in Pravasi Express Nite 2017 held at Holiday Inn, Singapore in the presence of Kerala Minister for Culture and Law Mr. AK Balan, Singapore Indian High Commissioner Mr.Javed Ashraf and Pravasi Express Chief Editor Mr.Rajesh Kumar. Minister Mr. AK Balan presided over the function and also inaugurated the 60th anniversary celebrations of Kairalee Kala Nilayam, Singapore. Veteran Film actor Madhu (actor) was honored with the Pravasi Express Lifetime Achievement Award for his contribution to Malayalam film industry and Football Legend IM Vijayan was awarded with Pravasi Express Lifetime Sports Excellence Award.

PE Lifetime Achievement Award	Madhu (actor), film actor
PE Lifetime Sports Excellence Award	IM Vijayan, football player
PE Malayalee Ratna Award	Sohan Roy
PE BusinessExcellence Award	Capt. Rajesh Unni, Synergy Group
PE Film Critic Award	Vinu Mohan, actor
PE Youth Icon Award	Rajisha Vijayan, actor

==== Special Categories ====
Other recipients were D Sudheeran (Literary Award), Shanta Rati (Dance Icon of Singapore), Sangeetha Nambiar (Women Empowerment), Deivani (Community Engagement), Dr.V P Nair (Health Care), Shilpa Krishnan Shukla (Women Achiever), Arun Sundar (Information Technology), Prajith Manikkoth (Young Achiever), Stephan Samuel (Social Excellence), Mallika Girish Panicher (Performing Arts) and Dr. Anitha Devi Pillai (Research Literature), Sooraj & Ann (Critic Award: Acting).

=== 2016 Awards ===
Pravasi Express Awards 2016 were presented by Ambassador-at-Large Gopinatha Pillai in “Pravasi Express Nite-2016” held at Kallang Theatre on 6 August 2016. The event was preceded over by Pravasi Express Editor-in-Chief G Rajesh Kumar and K B Ganesh Kumar, film actor and former Kerala minister was the guest of honour. The award function was followed by music led by G Venugopal and drama by Singapore Kairalee Kala Nilayam, Singapore.

PE Lifetime Achievement Award	Daya Bai, social activist
PE Music Excellence Award	G Venugopal, singer
PE Media Excellence Award	MP Shyam Kumar, Kerala Kaumudi, Kannur Unit Chief
PE Social Excellence Award	Jayadev Unnithan
PE Youth Choice Award	Parvathy Nambiar
PE Yuva Pravasi Award	Shaji Philip

==== Special Categories ====
Pravasi Express Awards were also presented to Jayakumar Aravindakshan (retail business), Sreenivas Kurupp (IT Business), Ashok Nair (Sports Excellence) and Gangadharan Kunnon (Community engagement) for work in their respective fields.

=== 2014 Awards ===
The awards were presented by Ambassador-at-Large Gopinatha Pillai, Actress Priyamani, All Malaysia Malayalee Association president Ravindran Menon and other famous personalities from India and Singapore. The award categories are as follows:

PE Lifetime Achievement Award	P. Jayachandran, singer
PE Malayalee Ratna Award	Tan Sri Datuk Ravindran Menon, Malaysia
PE Literary Award	M.K Bhasi, Malayalam poet and writer, Singapore
PE Youth Icon of the Year	Priyamani, National Award winner Actress
PE Vanitha Ratna Award	Latha K Namboodiri, Krystal Group, Bangalore
PE Business Excellence Award	Alexander Vadakkedam, India
PE Young Entrepreneur Award	Reju Kumar, Singapore
PE Young Achiever Award	Varun Chandran, Corporate360, Singapore.

==== Special Categories ====
Pravasi Express – Rising Star Award was given to outstanding Malayalee youngster in social, arts, sports or academics category. This award was given to Miss. Anjali George for her performance in contemporary art and creative paintings.

==== Editorial Excellence Awards ====
The winners of Pravasi Express – Editorial Excellence Awards 2014 are as follows:

PE Journalist of the year	Basil Baby
PE Photojournalist of the year	Lijesh Karunakaran
PE Special Award	Ms.Chitra KrishnaKumar, Krishna Lal PV, Panayam Liju, MKV Rajesh and Venmony Bimalraj

=== 2013 Awards ===
The awards were presented by Ambassador-at-Large Gopinatha Pillai, lyrist Anil Panachooran, actor Unni Mukundan and many other famous personalities in Singapore. The award categories is as follows:

PE Lifetime Achievement Award	V. S. Achuthanandan, former Chief Minister of Kerala
PE Literary Award	Anil Panachooran, Malayalam film lyricist and poet
PE Youth Icon of the Year	Unni Mukundan, film actor
PE Social Excellence Award	P. K. Koshy, President Singapore Malayalee Association
PE Business Excellence Award	Tony Vincent, Aratt Developers, Bangalore, India
PE Young Entrepreneur Award	Ajith Kumar T, Singapore Coliseum, Singapore
PE Yuva Pravasi Award	Syam Kumar Prabhakaran, Malayalam Educational Society, Singapore

==== Special Categories ====
The award ceremony also witnessed the honoring of two eminent Malayalees in Singapore. Shekhari Varma, Maharaja of Palaghat and was a freedom fighter for Indian Independence. Dominic Puthucheary, founding member of the People Action Party in Singapore and Malayalee who participated in shaping of Singapore.

Pravasi Express – Rising Star Award was given to outstanding Malayalee youngster in social, sports or academics category. This award was given to Vishal Thaniyath, U-16 Football Player in Singapore S.League.

==== Editorial Excellence Awards ====
Pravasi Express – Editorial Excellence Awards was introduced to recognize individuals on their contributions in different news arena and the winners were as follows

PE Journalist of the year	Basil Baby
PE Newspaper Feature Writer of the year	Panayam Liju
PE Photojournalist of the year	Nivesh Thekkarath
PE Special Award	A.R Jose and Mr. Subu Iyer
Editorial contributions	Ms Chitra Krishna Kumar and Ms Suchitthra Vasu
