= Veeraputhran =

- Film poster
- Directed by: P. T. Kunju Muhammed
- Story by: N. P. Mohammed
- Produced by: Siddique Mankara
- Starring: Narain; Raima Sen
- Cinematography: M. J. Radhakrishnan
- Edited by: Don Max
- Music by: Ramesh Narayan
- Production company: ITL Productions
- Release date: 14 October 2011
- Country: India
- Language: Malayalam

Veeraputhran (English: "Brave Son") is a 2011 Malayalam historical film directed by P. T. Kunju Muhammed based on the story written by N. P. Mohammed, which is based on the life of Indian freedom fighter and anti-Colonial activist Mohammed Abdul Rahiman (1898 – 1945). The film focuses on the anti-Colonial movements in present-day Kerala during British Raj. The film has Narain as Mohammed Abdul Rahiman and Raima Sen as Rahiman's wife Kunhi Beevathu. The cast also includes R. Sarathkumar, Lakshmi Gopalaswamy, Siddique, Kalabhavan Mani, Sai Kumar, Devan, Valsala Menon, and Sajitha Madathil.

== Plot ==
The film is about the eventful history of Malabar during India's independence struggle. The film primarily focusses on the life of Mohammed Abdul Rahiman, a freedom fighter and Congress leader, known for leading the Khilafat Movement. It covers the period in Malabar history starting with the arrival of Abdul Rahiman in Kerala at the age of 23, after discontinuing his education in Aligarh, up to his demise in 1945. The story travels through Rahiman Sahib's desperate failure in the election of 1934, the thrilling win that reclaims his position in the election of 1937, and the departure of his soulmate, whose wardrobe he carries with him as an un-detachable remembrance.

== Cast ==
- Narain as Mohammed Abdul Rahiman
- R. Sarathkumar as Vimal Menon
- Raima Sen as Kunhi Bee
- Siddique as Moithu moulavi
- Kalabhavan Mani as Ummerkutty
- Vinay Forrt
- Nishanth Sagar as League Leader
- Sai Kumar as Hassan Koya
- Devan as Advocate Krishnankutty
- Valsala Menon
- Sajitha Madathil
- S. P. Sreekumar as Kerala Gandhi K. Kelappaji
- Shanavas as K. P. Kesava Menon
- Sharran Puthumana as Manjeri Sundarayyar
- Jijoy Rajagopal as Research Scholar

== Production ==
When asked why did he make a film on Rahiman Sahib, the director said, "Mohammed Abdu Rahman Sahib has the kind of persona that can be approached by an artist. I thought that even in the current scenario, the politics of those days is significant. I also wanted to remind viewers about the struggles of those times."

The shooting of Veeraputhran started at Kamakkantakam Tharavad at Parappil in Kozhikode on 9 May 2011.

Leading actors as well as newcomers play the 150-odd characters of the film. Narain plays Mohammed Abdul Rahiman and Hindi actor Raima Sen makes her Malayalam debut with the role of Kunhi Beevathu, Abdul Rahman's wife. Prithviraj was originally cast to play the role of Abdul Rahiman but since he could not allot bulk dates for the film, he was replaced by Narain. The director says, "Yes, I had matched pictures of him with Mohammed Abdu Rahman Sahib and I waited for him for a while. When it wasn't happening, Narain was cast instead. I believe that Prithviraj did not lose anything by not doing my film and I didn't lose anything either by not casting him." About his preparations, Narain says, "Although there is a lot of literature about Abdul Rahman, there are practically no visuals. I had to create the character, based on the memories of a very old person who had interacted with him." The cast also includes Lakshmi Gopalaswamy, Siddique, Kalabhavan Mani, Sai Kumar, Devan, Valsala Menon, and Sajitha Madathil.

== Music ==
The film's music was composed by Ramesh Narayan

Veeraputhran
No.	Title	Lyrics	Music	Artist(s)	Length
1.	"Innee Kadalin"	Rafeeq Ahammed	Ramesh Narayan	Yesudas; Manjari
2.	"Kannodu Kannoram"	Rafeeq Ahammed	Ramesh Narayan	Shreya Ghoshal
3.	"Kannodu Kannoram (Unplugged)"	Rafeeq Ahammed	Ramesh Narayan	Shreya Ghoshal
4.	"Kanni Vellakkaarupole"	Edassery Govindan Nair	Ramesh Narayan	Yesudas
5.	"Thudare Maddalavum"	Moyinkutty Vaidyar	Ramesh Narayan	Shankar Mahadevan
6.	"Varika Varika"	Amsi Narayanapilla	Ramesh Narayan	M. G. Sreekumar
7.	"Varoo Varoo"		Ramesh Narayan	Ramesh Narayan

== Controversies ==
Veeraputhran was accused of giving indications that Mohammed Abdul Rahiman was poisoned to death while official history states that he had a natural death. Writer Hameed Chennamangalur, from whose ancestral family house Rahman Sahib had his last dinner and later collapsed at a nearby market, said the insinuation in the film that his food was poisoned "not only distorts history but defames my ancestors." Asked about the row, director P. T. Kunju Muhammed told that he had not tried to distort history in the movie. "History is not a monopoly of anyone and there can be different interpretations. I have conducted an investigation in my own style by eliciting views of eminent historians and the local people," he said.

== Critical reception ==
The film opened to much positive critical reviews. Keerthy Ramachandran of Deccan Chronicle rated the film and called it a "promising historical work of art." Paresh C Palicha of Rediff said, "Veeraputhran may have been made with noble intentions, but it lacks the emotional resonance of the director's previous works." he gave the movie a rating of. Almost all reviewers were unanimous in praising Narain's performance as Mohammed Abdul Rahiman Sahib.
