= Julie Gundert =

Swiss missionary and educator in India

- Born: Julie Dubois; October 1, 1809; Corcelles, Canton of Neuchâtel
- Died: September 18, 1885 (aged 75); Calw, Kingdom of Württemberg
- Known for: Missionary and teacher in southern India; grandmother of Hermann Hesse
- Spouse: Hermann Gundert (m. 1838)
- Children: 8

Julie Gundert (born Julie Dubois; 1 October 1809 – 18 September 1885) was a Swiss Protestant missionary and teacher who worked in southern India for the Basel Mission. She is notable as the first female missionary of the Basel Mission in southern India.

== Life ==
=== Early life and education ===
Julie Dubois was born on 1 October 1809 in Corcelles, on the shores of Lake Neuchâtel, as the second-to-last of six children of François and Judith Dubois, winegrowers. She grew up in a strict Protestant environment, encountered Pietism through Sunday school, and joined the movement at age 14. She gained her first professional experience as a teacher and supervisor, and later as a caregiver in a private household in Rolle, where she came into contact with missionary networks.

=== Missionary work in India ===
After her send-off blessing in 1836, Dubois left London for India in the company of English missionary Anthony Norris Groves, his second wife Harriet, and their family. In Madras, she managed the Groves household and taught the Indian girls living with the family. In 1837, she moved with the family to the mission at Chittoor, founded by the sons of Groves and German missionary, Indologist, and linguist Hermann Gundert, whom she married in 1838. The couple subsequently joined the Basel Mission and had eight children, two of whom died in infancy.

Sent to Tellicherry by the Basel Mission, Hermann and Julie Gundert founded the organization's first station in the Malabar province. Julie Gundert taught Indian girls and women reading, writing, and domestic skills according to Pietist educational methods. She also managed her household, cared for her own children, and assisted European and Indian women during childbirth.

=== Return to Europe and later years ===
Seriously weakened by the Indian climate and repeated pregnancies, she traveled to Europe with her husband and children in 1846. Before returning to India in 1847, the couple entrusted some of their children to grandparents in Stuttgart and others to a Basel family that hosted missionaries' children. Children born subsequently in India were also sent to Europe for their education — a common practice among missionary couples that entailed separations of several years.

In 1857, Julie Gundert took over the direction of the girls' school in Calicut, assisted by her daughter Marie Gundert (the future mother of Hermann Hesse), who returned to India at age 15 after eleven years in Europe. Due to health problems, Hermann Gundert returned in 1859 to his hometown of Calw, Germany. Although she would have preferred to remain in India and barely spoke German, Julie Gundert joined her husband in Calw the following year, where she spent the last 25 years of her life. She died there on 18 September 1885.

== Legacy ==
Julie Gundert's work in Indian missionary schools contributed to the literacy of women and had an emancipatory effect on local populations. However, her education of girls was shaped by patriarchal norms and by the colonial convictions of the Basel Mission. As the first female missionary of the Basel Mission in southern India, her pioneering role was recognized as early as the 19th century in missionary literature.

== Bibliography ==
=== Primary and secondary sources ===
- Hesse, Marie: "Julie Gundert geborene Dubois", in: Merz, Heinrich: Christliche Frauenbilder aus neuerer Zeit, vol. 2, 1898^{6}, pp. 427–459.
- Hoffmann, Aline: Sie reden noch. Sieben Lebensbilder aus der Missionsarbeit der Frau, 1926.
- Gundert, Adele: Marie Hesse. Ein Lebensbild in Briefen und Tagebüchern, 1953.
- Prodolliet, Simone: Wider die Schamlosigkeit und das Elend der heidnischen Weiber. Die Basler Frauenmission und der Export des europäischen Frauenideals in die Kolonien, 1987.
- Bühler, Marianne: Julie, geb. Dubois. Missionarin in Indien. Eine Frau in der Basler Mission des 19. Jahrhunderts, 1989.
- Haas, Waltraud: Erlitten und erstritten. Der Befreiungsweg von Frauen in der Basler Mission 1816–1966, 1994.
- Becker, Judith: «Conversio» im Wandel. Basler Missionare zwischen Europa und Südindien und die Ausbildung einer Kontaktreligiosität, 1834–1860, 2015.
- Becker, Judith: "Frauen in der Mission und Mädchenschulen", in: Christ-von Wedel, Christine; Kuhn, Thomas K. (eds.): Basler Mission. Menschen, Geschichte, Perspektiven 1815–2015, 2015, pp. 57–62.
- Ensslin, Henriette: Zur Erinnerung an Grossmama Julie Gundert-Dubois, 2017.
- Koiloth Ramath, Amritha; Koudur, Shashikantha: "The missionary housemother and her 'daughters': Voice and agency in female subaltern spaces in 19th century Malabar", in: Journal for Cultural Research, 27/1, 2023, pp. 85–104.
- Konrad, Dagmar: Missionskinder. Migration und Trennung in Missionarsfamilien der Basler Mission des 19. Jahrhunderts, 2023.

=== Archival sources ===
- Basel Mission Archive, Basel (Archiv Basler Mission): portraits and school drawings relating to Julie Gundert (QL-30.006.0264; QC-30.010.0046).
