= E. Moidu Moulavi =

Indian feedom fighter

E. Moidu Moulavi (1886–1995) was an Indian National Congress (INC) leader, Islamic scholar, one of the Salafi movements reformers, scholar and educationist of Malabar District, born at Maranchery in Ponnani. He was a supporter of the Islahi movement in Kerala and a co-worker with leaders like K. M. Maulavi, Sayyid Sanaulla Makti Thangal, Mohammed Abdul Rahiman and K. M. Seethi Sahib

== Early years ==
E. Moidu Moulavi was born in 1886 to the family of Malayankulathel Marakkar Musliyar Maranchery. He was an enemy of Bidath, a scholar and freedom activist from Ponnani. He received primary education at the Kodenchery Dars religious seminary before moving to Vazhakkad, after which he would complete his studies at the Vazhakkad Darul Uloom Arabic college under the tutelage of Chalilakath Kunhahammad Haji. Following his education, he joined the Indian National Movement in 1919. As a skilled orator and organizer, he was instrumental in drawing Mohammed Abdul Rahiman into the Indian Independence movement. He was the founding secretary of the Majlisul Ulema, an organization formed for social reform amongst the Mappila community and to draw their participation in the Indian National Movement. Moulavi was arrested and underwent rigorous imprisonment during the Khilafat Movement of 1921. He had to undergo imprisonment for another 9 months in 1930 for his participation in the Payyannur Salt Sathyagraha struggle. He was oncemore given jail terms for a period of 3 years for taking part in the Quit India Movement. He was released in 1947 after the Congress party came to power in India.

Moidu Moulavi served as K.P.C.C working Committee Member, AICC member etc. He was elected to the Malabar District Board from Andathode Farqa in 1938. He was also member of the Kozhikode Municipality. In Independent India, he was nominated for Parliament membership but declined the offer to resign from politics and concentrate on education and social reform within his community.

E Moidu Moulavi, along with Mohammed Abdul Rahiman launched the Al-Ameen newspaper from Calicut during 1929–1939. It was later closed down by the British authorities.

== Recognition ==
He was honoured in the Indian Freedom Fighters' conference organised in 1985 January in Allahabad, hoisting the flag in the opening ceremony. He speaks six languages. He was also the author of several books including an Autobiography. Moidu Moulavi continued the nationalist traditions of Mohammed Abdul Rahiman. His participation in the freedom movement was an inspiration to many later Congress Party leaders. He and K. Kumarji of Travancore, who constantly wore the 'Gandhi Cap' openly proclaiming deep commitment to the nationalist sentiments, were amongst the most popular leaders in Kerala.

== Books ==
His autobiography was published in 1981 as Maulaviyude Athmakatha. He also wrote a biography of his close associate Mohammed Abdul Rahiman titled Ente Kuttukaran (My friend).

He died in 1995, aged 109. A memorial was constructed in his memory at Kozhikode. M Rasheed, journalist and author is his son.
