= Venad Pathrika =

Malayalam evening daily printed

Venad Pathrika (Malayalam: വേണാട് പത്രിക) is a Malayalam evening daily printed and published from Thiruvananthapuram, Kerala, India. It is a privately owned daily started in 1989 by its founder K Janardhanan Nair. It was established with the core purpose of enhancing society by collecting and distributing high-quality news and information.

Venad Pathrika provides news, analysis, features, and special columns of public interest. K Janardhanan Nair is a senior journalist, member of Press Club, Thiruvananthapuram, whose contributions to small and medium newspapers in Kerala has been widely acknowledged. He has served as the Vice President of Press Club, Thiruvananthapuram, General Secretary of the Federation of Small and Medium Newspapers (NewsFed), General Secretary of G Neelambaran Memorial Trust and Member of State Executive and Thiruvananthapuram District Committee of the Kerala Union of Working Journalists (KUWJ).

== See also ==
- List of Malayalam language newspapers
- Malayalam journalism
