= Chilappol Penkutty =

- Directed by: Prasad Nooranad
- Written by: M Kamaruddin
- Produced by: Suneesh Samuel
- Cinematography: Srijith C Nair
- Edited by: R Ranjith
- Music by: Ajay Sarigama
- Distributed by: Trueline
- Release date: 19 July 2019
- Country: India
- Language: Malayalam

Chilappol Penkutty is an Indian Malayalam-language film directed by Prasad Nooranad and written by M Kamaruddin. The film is produced by Suneesh Samuel under the banner of True Movie Makers. The movie stars Krishnachandran, Sunil Sukhada, Aristo Suresh, Suneesh Samuel, Avani S Prasad and Kavya Ganesh in the lead roles.

== Cast ==
- Suneesh Samuel
- Avani S Prasad
- Kavya Ganesh as Vandana
- Samreen Rathish
- Krishnachandran
- Sunil Sukhada
- V. Suresh Thampanoor
- Lakshmi Prasad
- Naushad
- Parvathi
- Sivamurali
- Sharath
- Akhil Raj Mollyland
- Rudra S Lal as Lakshmi
- Dileep Shanker
- Priya Rajeev as Bindu
- Shruthi Rajanikanth
- Bhagyalakshmi
- Jayalal

== Plot ==
The movie discusses the atrocities committed towards women and its consequences in the light of Kathua rape case where an eight-year-old girl was raped and murdered. The film portrays the feeling of the victims when such an incident is being discussed on social media. The film also shows, how the victim is getting help from one of her friends.

== Soundtrack ==
Chilappol Penkutty

Soundtrack album by Ajay Sarigama
- Released: 30 July 2018
- Genre: Film soundtrack
- Length: 11:41
- Language: Malayalam
- Label: East Cost
- Producer: Suneesh Samuel

The soundtrack for Chilappol Penkutty was composed by Ajay Sarigama. The soundtrack of the film was released by Kadakampally Surendran, Minister of Tourism, Kerala by handing over the audio CD to East Coast Vijayan at a launch event at Thiruvananthapuram on 30, July 2018.

Track listing
No.	Title	Lyrics	Singer(s)	Length
1.	"Changathikkatte"	Rajeev Alunkal	Archana V Prakash	3:39
2.	"Kozhinja Pookkal"	Murukan Kattakada	Rakesh Unni, Veena Prakash	1:38
3.	"Etho Oru Kanavayi"	SS. Biju	Abhijith Kollam, Jinsha Haridas	3:36
4.	"Oru Neenda Venalil"	M Kamaruddin	Jinsha Haridas	2:48
Total length:				11:41
