= Uracheri Gurukkanmar =

Uracheri Gurukkanmar (also known as Puthusseri Gurukkal) were 19th gurus century in India. They taught scholar and linguist Herman Gundert the Sanskrit and Malayalam languages when he travelled in India as a missionary in the nineteenth century.

The Five Brothers, or Five Pandits, as they were sometimes known, were born to the Kaviyur, the Thiyya family (Vithihothracaste) in Chokli near Thalassery. The Gurukulam LP School, founded in 1871, was founded by the Urachery Gurukkal. The following are the five Uracheri Gurunathanmar:

- Kunjikannan Gurunathan (1764–1841),
- Kunjichanthan Gurunathan
- Othenan Gurunathan
- Chathappan Gurunathan
- Koran Gurunathan

The gurus were poets. The lived in a place that became Kaviyoor. Hermann Gundert heard about the gurus and sought them out to learn Malayalam. Gundert invited the Uracheri gurus to his home in Illikunnu. Their teaching about the literary and colloquial aspects of the language resulted in Gundert's publication of the first English-Malayalam dictionary. The only surviving monument to these gurus is the house where they lived in Kaviyoor.
