= C. Ajayaprasad =

Indian politician (born 1967)

Chellappan Pillai Ajayaprasad (born 1967) is an Indian politician from Kerala. He is a member of the Kerala Legislative Assembly from the Punalur Assembly constituency in Kollam district representing the Communist Party of India.

== Early life ==
Ajayaprasad is from Punalur, Kollam district, Kerala. He is the son of Chellappan Pillai. He studied till Class 10 at Anchal East High School, Anchal, Punalur taluk and passed the SSLC examinations. His wife is a teacher. He declared assets worth Rs.58 lakhs in his affidavit to the Election Commission of India.

== Career ==
Ajayaprasad won the Punalur Assembly constituency district representing the Communist Party of India in the 2026 Kerala Legislative Assembly election. He polled 71,944 votes and defeated his nearest rival, Noushad Younus of the Indian Union Muslim League, by a margin of 21,529 votes.
