= K. Raju =

Indian politician

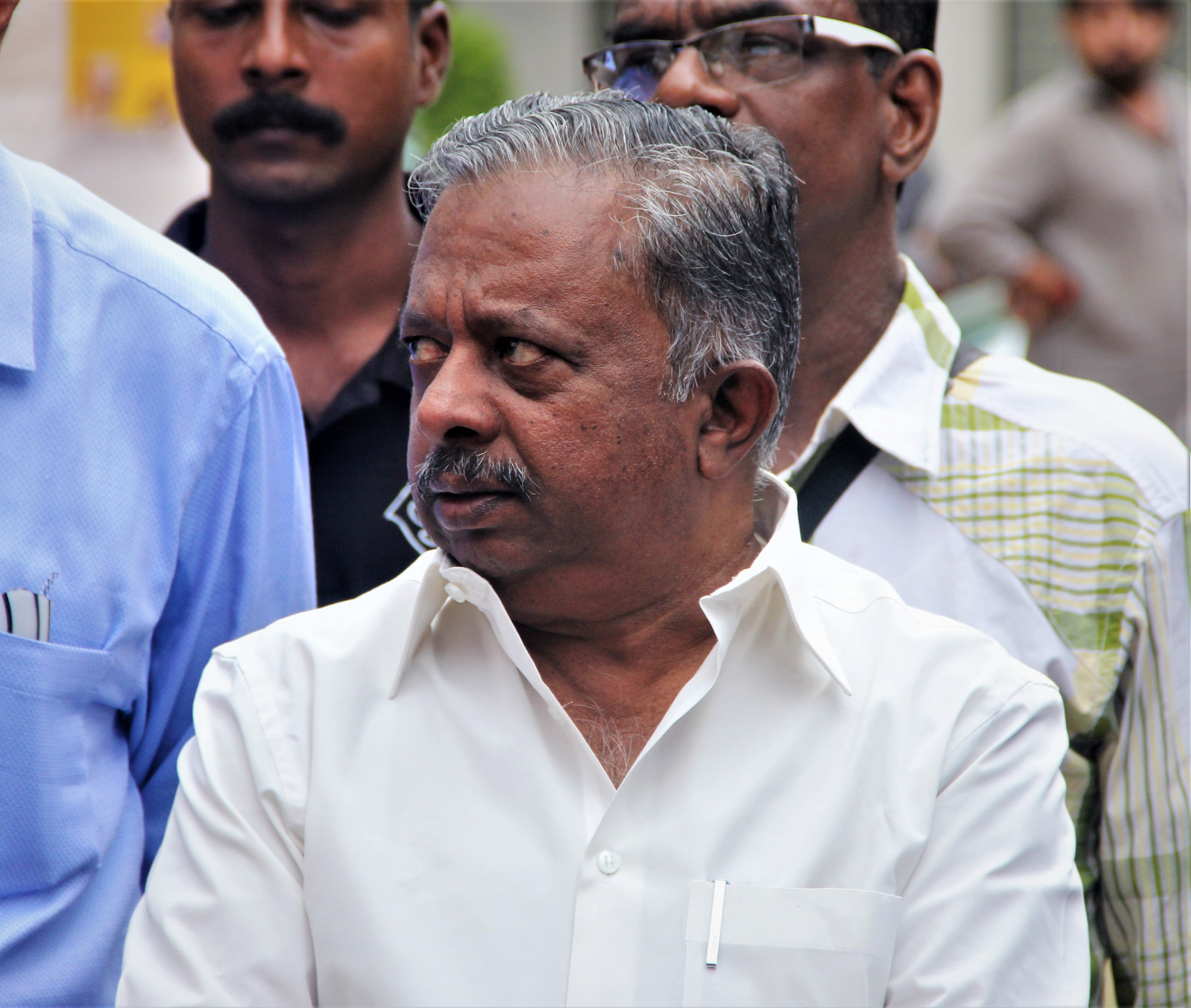
- K. Raju

Minister of Forest and Wildlife, Government of Kerala
- In office 25 May 2016 – 3 May 2021
- Governor: P. Sathasivam; Arif Mohammad Khan
- Chief Minister: Pinarayi Vijayan
- Preceded by: Thiruvanchoor Radhakrishnan
- Succeeded by: A. K. Saseendran

Member of the Kerala Legislative Assembly
- In office 2006 – 3 May 2021
- Preceded by: P. S. Supal
- Succeeded by: P. S. Supal
- Constituency: Punalur

Personal details
- Born: 10 April 1953 (age 73) Nettayam
- Party: Communist Party of India
- Spouse: B Sheeba
- Children: Nithin Raj, Rithik Raj
- Parent(s): G. Karunakaran; Pankajakshy

Adv Karunakaran Raju is an Indian politician and the previous Minister of Forests, Wildlife Protection, Animal husbandry, Dairy Development, Milk- Co-operatives, Zoos of Kerala Legislative Assembly. He belongs to Communist Party of India and represents Punalur constituency. He was previously elected to the Assembly in 2006 and 2011.

== Positions held ==
- State Vice-President, Library Council (1995-2005)
- Member, Yeroor Panchayat (5 Years)
- Chairman, Standing Committee, District Panchayat, Kollam
- Member, Scheduled Tribe State Advisory Committee, Forest-Wildlife State Advisory Committee
- Member, General Council, Advanced Legal University, Cochin
- State Council Member, CPI
- National Executive Committee Member and State Secretary, Bharathiya Karshaka Thozhilali Union.

== Personal life ==
Raju is the son of G. Karunakaran and Pankajakshy. He was born on 10 April 1953 at Nettayam-Yeroor. He is a lawyer by profession. He is married to B. Sheeba and has two sons Nithin Raj and Rithik Raj. He lives in Anchal, Kollam.
