= P. S. Supal =

Indian politician

Member of Kerala Legislative Assembly
- In office 24 May 2021 – 23 May 2026
- Preceded by: K. Raju
- Succeeded by: Ajayaprasad C
- In office 1996–2006
- Preceded by: P. K. Sreenivasan
- Succeeded by: K. Raju
- Constituency: Punalur

Personal details
- Born: 7 February 1970 (age 56)
- Party: Communist Party of India
- Spouse: P. N. Reena
- Children: 2 daughters
- Parents: P. K. Sreenivasan (father); G. Saralamma (mother)
- Education: Graduate, LLB
- Alma mater: Kerala University
- Profession: Politician

P. Sreenivasan Supal (born 7 February 1970) is an Indian politician and leader of Communist Party of India. He represented Punalur constituency in the Kerala Legislative Assembly from 1996 to 2006. He is the son of former MLA P.K. Sreenivasan. He was elected from Punalur (State Assembly constituency) in the Kerala Legislative Assembly election 2021.

== Positions held ==
- Secretary, CPI Kollam district
- Assistant Secretary, CPI Kollam District Council
- Secretary, AIKS Kollam District Committee
- Member of CPI Kerala State Council,
- Member of Kerala University Senate;
- President, AIYF Kerala State Committee;
- Secretary, AIYF Kerala State Committee;
- Vice President, AIYF National Council;
- President Rehabilitation Plantation Workers Union
