= Abhijith Kollam =

Playback singer

Abhijth Kollam
- Origin: Kollam, Kerala, India
- Genres: Playback Singer
- Occupation: Playback Singer
- Years active: 2015 – present

Abhijith Vijayan, popularly known as Abhijith Kollam is an Indian playback singer, popular in Malayalam movie industry. He was born in Kollam, Kerala. Abhijith has recorded songs for more than 12 Malayalam movies and few Malayalam devotional albums. He won the Pravasi Express award for the Best Singer in the year 2018. In March 2020, Abhijith married actress Vismaya Sree at Kollam.

The resemblance of his voice to that of famous singer K. J. Yesudas caused to lost him out the Kerala State Film Awards for the Best Singer in the year 2018.

== Discography ==
Year	Song	Film	Language	Musician
2015	Poomarachillayil	Ariyaathe Ishtamaay	Malayalam	Xavier Cheruvalli
2017	Aalin Kombil	Mannamkattayum Kariyilayum	Malayalam	Suchin Dev
2018	Kuttanadan Kattu	Bhayanakam	Malayalam	M. K. Arjunan
2018	Sooryathanthri Meetti	Ganapathiyude Punyaalan	Malayalam	Mohan Sithara
2018	Doore Maanjuvo	Theetta Rappai	Malayalam	Anwar Aman
2018	Elampadi Elelelo	Oru Kuttanadan Blog	Malayalam	Sreenath Sivasankaran
2019	Etho Oru Kanavaayi	Chilappol Penkutty	Malayalam	Ajay Sarigama
2019	Manamurukum Neram	Vishudha Pusthakam	Malayalam	Sumesh Koottickal
2019	Ethra Sundaram	A For Apple	Malayalam	Jerry Amaldev
2019	Kinaaviloru Naalam	Sakthan Market	Malayalam	Vinu Lal
2019	Chellam Chellam	Brother's Day	Malayalam	4 Musics
2019	Kaathoram Thaaraattu	Kosrakkollikal	Malayalam	Kaithapram Viswanathan
2019	Chanthamulla Penne	Kosrakkollikal	Malayalam	Kaithapram Viswanathan
2019	Poothu Nilkkunna	Kosrakkollikal	Malayalam	Kaithapram Viswanathan
2020	Chandana Poomarathanalil	Love FM	Malayalam	Ashraf Manjeri
2022	Velledare	Swa	Telugu	Karanam Sri Raghavendra

== See also ==
- Pravasi Express Awards
