= K. Krishna Pillai =

Indian politician

Member of the Kerala Legislative Assembly
- In office 4 October 1970 – 22 March 1977
- Preceded by: M. N. Govindan Nair
- Succeeded by: P. K. Sreenivasan
- Constituency: Punalur
- In office 9 September 1960 – 10 September 1964
- Preceded by: P. Gopalan
- Succeeded by: M. N. Govindan Nair
- Constituency: Punalur

Personal details
- Born: K. Krishna Pillai; 7 June 1924
- Died: 5 July 1986 (aged 62)
- Party: Communist Party of India
- Spouse: P. Rajamma
- Children: 3 sons, 2 daughters
- As of 14 October, 2021 Source: niyamasabha

K. Krishna Pillai (7 June 1924 – 5 July 1986) was an Indian politician of the Communist Party of India. He was an MLA of Kerala Legislative Assembly who represented Punalur constituency in 2nd session and 4th session. He joined the Royal Navy in 1943, but was dismissed in 1946 for his involvement in the Bombay Naval Uprising. He entered politics through the Indian National Congress and later joined the Communist Party of India.

Pillai was the publisher and then the managing editor of Kerala Janatha, a Malayalam language newspaper that ran six days a week from 1957 to the late 60s. Pattom A. Thanu Pillai was the founder of this newspaper.
