= Punalur Assembly constituency =

Constituency of the Kerala legislative assembly in India

Punalur
- Constituency No. 121 for the Kerala Legislative Assembly
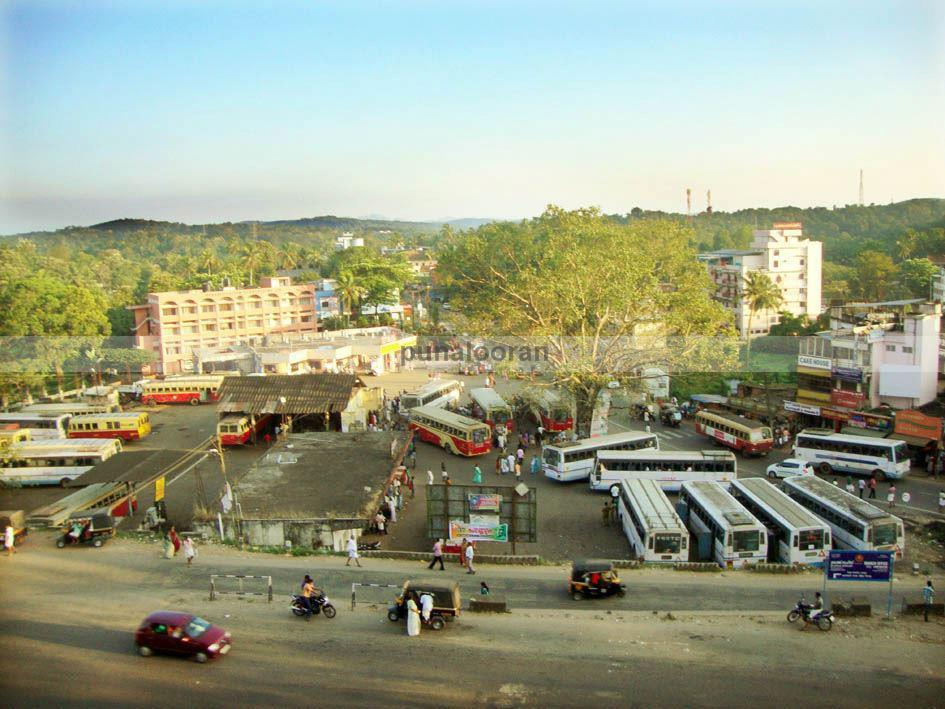
- Punalur KSRTC Bus Station

Constituency details
- Country: India
- Region: South India
- State: Kerala
- District: Kollam
- Established: 1957
- Total electors: 1,46251 (2021)
- Reservation: None

Member of Legislative Assembly
- 16th Kerala Legislative Assembly
- Incumbent Ajayaprasad C
- Party: CPI
- Alliance: LDF
- Elected year: 2026

Punalur is a legislative assembly constituency in Kollam district of Kerala, India. It is one among the 11 assembly constituencies in Kollam district. The current MLA is Ajayaprasad C of CPI.

== Structure ==
As per the recent changes in Assembly constituency delimitations, Punalur Assembly constituency consists of the municipality of Punalur and seven neighbouring panchayaths including Anchal, Ariyankavu, Edamulakkal, Eroor, Karavaloor, Kulathupuzha and Thenmala in Punalur taluk.

== Electoral history ==
Punalur Assembly constituency was carved out from Pathanapuram Assembly constituency in 1954.

=== Travancore-Cochin Legislative Assembly Elections ===
Year	Winner	Party	Vote Margin	Coalition
1954	P. Gopalan	CPI	3,417	Left

== Members of the Legislative Assembly ==
The following list contains all members of Kerala Legislative Assembly who have represented the constituency:

Year	Member	Political party
1957	P. Gopalan	Communist Party of India
1960	K. Krishna Pillai	Communist Party of India
1967	M. N. Govindan Nair	Communist Party of India
1970	K. Krishna Pillai	Communist Party of India
1977	P. K. Sreenivasan	Communist Party of India
1980	P. K. Sreenivasan	Communist Party of India
1982	M. Sam Oommen	Kerala Congress (Joseph)
1984 (Note: By-Election)	V. Surendran Pillai	Kerala Congress (Joseph)
1987	J. Chitharanjan	Communist Party of India
1991	Punalur Madhu	Indian National Congress
1996	P. K. Sreenivasan	Communist Party of India
1996	P. S. Supal	Communist Party of India
2001	P. S. Supal	Communist Party of India
2006	K. Raju	Communist Party of India
2011	K. Raju	Communist Party of India
2016	K. Raju	Communist Party of India
2021	P. S. Supal	Communist Party of India
2026	C. Ajayaprasad	Communist Party of India

== Election results ==
Percentage change (±%) denotes the change in the number of votes from the immediate previous election.

=== 2026 ===
2026 Kerala Legislative Assembly election: Punalur
Party	Candidate	Votes	%	±%
CPI	C. Ajayaprasad	71,944	50.47	
IUML	Noushad Yonus	50,415	35.37	
TTP	Adv. Reghunadh Kamukumchery	15,393	10.8	
BSP	Jose Saranath	1,425	1	
SUCI(C)	K Mahesh	560	0.39	
NOTA	None of the above	1,281	0.9	
Margin of victory		21,529		
Turnout		142556		
CPI hold		Swing		

=== 2021 ===
There were 2,05,830 registered voters in the constituency for the 2021 Kerala Assembly election.

2021 Kerala Legislative Assembly election: Punalur
Party	Candidate	Votes	%	±%
CPI	P. S. Supal	80,428	54.99	▼1.86
IUML	Abdurahiman Randathani	43,371	29.66	▼3.95
BJP	Ayoor Murali	20,069	13.72	
NOTA	None of the above	688	0.47	
Independent	Shibu M. Scaria	617	0.42	−
SUCI(C)	K. Mahesh	407	0.28	▼0.49
Independent	Thenmala Nagarajan	264	0.18	
Margin of victory		37,057	25.33	▲2.09
Turnout		1,46,251	71.05	▲0.45
CPI hold		Swing	▼1.86	

=== 2016 ===
There were 2,04,628 registered voters in the constituency for the 2016 Kerala Assembly election.

2016 Kerala Legislative Assembly election: Punalur
Party	Candidate	Votes	%	±%
CPI	K. Raju	82,136	56.85	▲2.33
IUML	A. Younus Kunju	48,554	33.61	
KEC	Sisil Fernandes	10,558	7.31	
SUCI(C)	K. Sasankan	1,117	0.77	▲0.40
NOTA	None of the above	888	0.61	
Independent	Nettayam Suji	639	0.44	−
SS	Satheeshkumar B.	415	0.29	
Independent	Navas M.	164	0.11	
Margin of victory		33,582	23.24	▲9.73
Turnout		1,44,471	70.60	▲0.47
CPI hold		Swing	▲2.33	

=== 2011 ===
There were 1,89,994 registered voters in the constituency for the 2011 election.

2011 Kerala Legislative Assembly election: Punalur
Party	Candidate	Votes	%	±%
CPI	K. Raju	72,648	54.52	
INC	Johnson Abraham	54,643	41.01	
BJP	B. Radhamani	4,155	3.12	
Independent	S. Jayakumar	699	0.52	
BSP	Kuzhichayil Sunil	606	0.45	
SUCI(C)	S. Shailaja	494	0.37	−
Margin of victory		18,005	13.51	
Turnout		1,33,245	70.13	
CPI hold		Swing		

=== 2006 ===
2006 Kerala Legislative Assembly election: Punalur
Party	Candidate	Votes	%	±%
CPI	K. Raju	58,895	51.91	
CMP	M. V. Raghavan	50,970	44.93	
Margin of victory		7,925	6.98	
Turnout		1,13,433		
CPI hold		Swing		

=== 2001 ===
There were 1,72,072 registered voters in the constituency for the 2001 election.

2001 Kerala Legislative Assembly election: Punalur
Party	Candidate	Votes	%	±%
CPI	P. S. Supal	57,065	48.15	
INC	A. Hidur Muhammod	55,522	46.85	
BJP	B. Radhamani	4,660	3.93	
Margin of victory		1,543	1.30	
Turnout		1,18,514	68.92	
CPI hold		Swing		

=== 1996 by-election ===
1996 by-election: Punalur
Party	Candidate	Votes	%	±%
CPI	P. S. Supal	65,401	57.62	
INC	Bharathipuram Sasi	44,068	38.82	
Margin of victory		21,333	18.80	
Turnout		1,13,513		
CPI hold		Swing		

=== 1996 ===
There were 1,59,320 registered voters in the constituency for the 1996 election.

1996 Kerala Legislative Assembly election: Punalur
Party	Candidate	Votes	%	±%
CPI	P. K. Sreenivasan	55,382	50.88	
INC	Punalur Madhu	48,684	44.73	
Margin of victory		6,698	6.15	
Turnout		1,08,845	69.44	
CPI gain from INC		Swing		

=== 1991 ===
There were 1,53,639 registered voters in the constituency for the 1991 election.

1991 Kerala Legislative Assembly election: Punalur
Party	Candidate	Votes	%	±%
INC	Punalur Madhu	53,050	49.20	
CPI	Mullakkara Ratnakaran	51,738	47.98	
BJP	S. Vijayan	2,700	2.50	
Margin of victory		1,312	1.22	
Turnout		1,07,836	70.97	
INC gain from CPI		Swing		
