= Deepika (newspaper) =

Malayalam newspaper in India

- Type: Daily Newspaper
- Format: Broadsheet
- Owner: Rashtra Deepika Ltd.
- Founder: Nidhiry Mani Kathanar
- Editor: George Kudilil
- Managing editor: Michael Vettickat
- Founded: 15 April 1887
- Language: Malayalam, English
- Headquarters: Kottayam
- Circulation: 5,00,000 daily
- Readership: 3.0 Million
- Sister newspapers: Rashtradeepika
- Website: www.deepika.com
- Free online archives: epaper.deepika.com

Deepika (transl. Lantern; known as Nasrani Deepika till 1939) is an Indian Malayalam-language newspaper, which is one of the oldest newspapers published in India. It is a mouthpiece of the Syro-Malabar Catholic Church in the region. Started in 1887, it is the oldest Malayalam newspaper now in circulation. Deepika publishes editions from Kottayam, Kochi, Kannur, Thrissur, Thiruvananthapuram and Kozhikode.

== History ==
Deepika newspaper was started in 1887 as Nasrani Deepika by a Syrian Catholic priest, Nidhiry Mani Kathanar. Jatiaikya Sangham, an organisation formed with the objective of uniting the Pazhayakoor and Puthenkoor communities among the Christians of Kerala, came up with the idea of a newspaper for all the various Christian communities in Kerala.

Although this project did not work out, the Catholics in this group sought the permission of Mar Marcelinos, the bishop of Veropoly and started a newspaper. The first issue of the newspaper was published on 15 April 1887. Initially, the newspaper was printed on a wooden printing press at St. Joseph's Printing Press, Mannanam, near Kottayam. The first editor-in-chief was Nidhiry Mani Kathanar.

Shortly afterwards, the Nasrani Deepika newspaper split from the Jatiaikya Sangham and was taken over by the Mannanam Ashram, the religious house of the congregation started by St. Kuriakose Elias Chavara.

Initially published twice a month, Nasrani Deepika became a daily newspaper from January 1927, going through various stages of publication, three times a month and three times a week. In 1939, the headquarters was shifted from Mannanam to Kottayam. At this point, the newspaper removed the name Nasrani and became just Deepika.

In 1989, the Deepika daily was transferred to Rashtradeepika Limited, a public limited company with clergy, faithful, directors and shareholders. Later in 2005, the acquisition of a majority stake in the company by some individuals and the forced retirement of permanent employees, including journalists, led to much controversy.

Deepika has been accused of extorting money from the CIA by former chief minister V. S. Achuthanandan. The newspaper announced that the Chief Minister would be paid Rs 1 crore if the allegations are proved.

The Deepika Friends Club, which includes Deepika readers, was launched in 2015. Fr. Benny Mundanattu is the Managing Director and Dr. George Kudilil is the Chief Editor of Deepika Group.

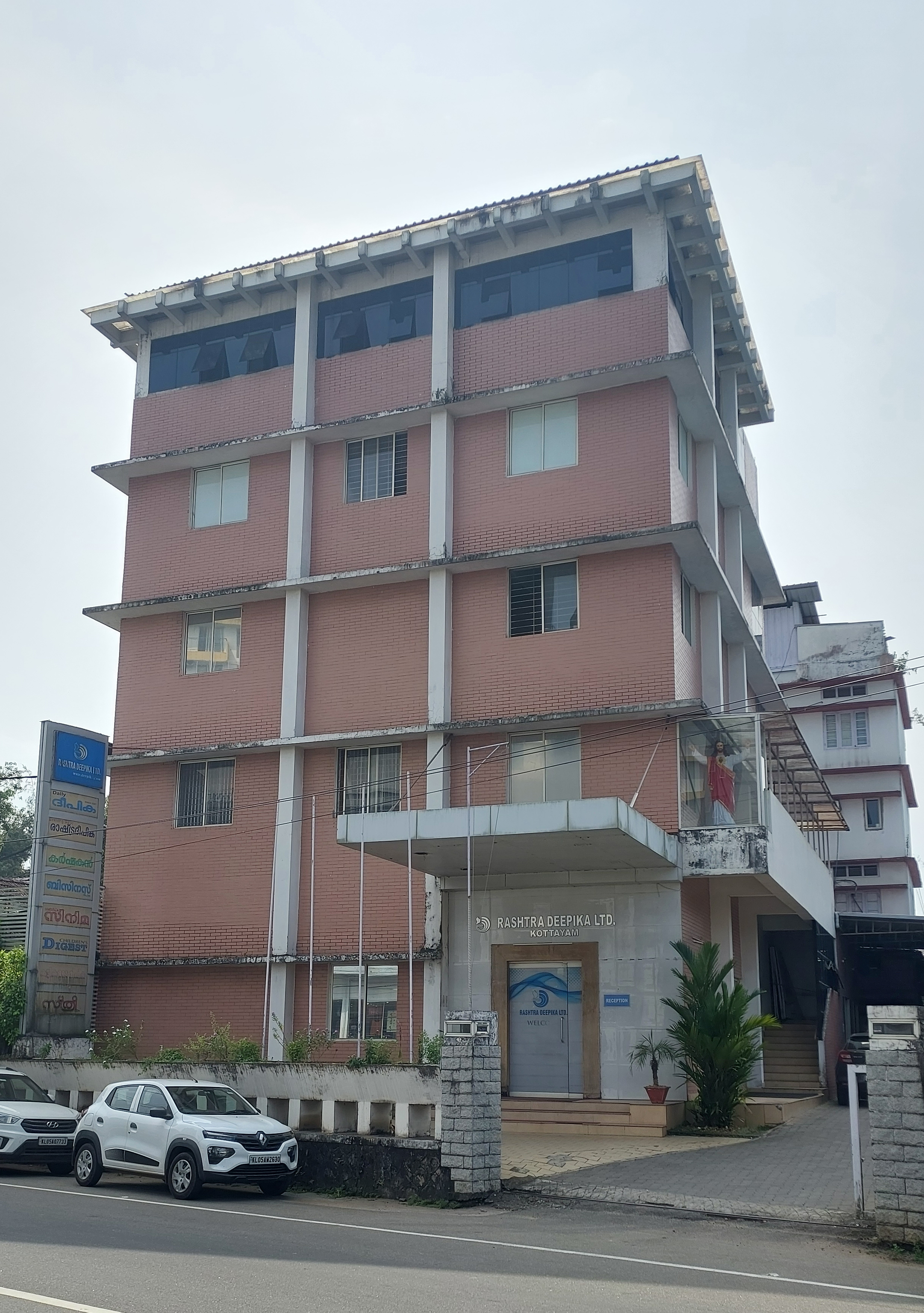
Rashtra Deepika Ltd., Kottayam

Deepika was successful in initiating many new changes and innovations in Malayalam journalism. Deepika was and is the most popular newspaper among the Syrian Catholic community. Deepika has taken a strong stand for the farmers and the disadvantaged. Deepika is credited with being the first Malayalam newspaper to devote an entire page to sports and the first Malayalam daily to launch an internet edition. In April 1992 an evening edition, Rashtra Deepika, was added to the newspaper group.

Currently, Deepika owns two news portals, www.deepika.com and www.rashtradeepika.com.

Deepika completed 125 years of service in 2012.

== Subsidiaries ==
| Name | Frequency | Language | Type |
|---|---|---|---|
| The Rashtra Deepika | Evening Daily | Malayalam | Newspaper |
| Business Deepika | Weekly | Malayalam | Business Magazine |
| Karshakan | Monthly | Malayalam | Agricultural Magazine |
| Sthreedhanam | Monthly | Malayalam | Women's Magazine |
| Rashtra Deepika Cinema | Monthly | Malayalam | Film Magazine |
| Kuttikalude Deepika | Weekly | Malayalam | Children's fortnightly |
| Children's Digest | Monthly | English | Children's Magazine |

== Publishing Centres ==
Deepika publishes editions from :

- Kottayam
- Kochi
- Kannur
- Thrissur
- Thiruvananthapuram
- Kozhikode

== Digital Platforms ==
• deepika.com (Online newspaper)

• deepikaglobal.com (Online English Newspaper)

• deepikaglobal.com Radio (Online radio)

== See also ==
- List of Malayalam-language newspapers
- List of Malayalam-language periodicals
- List of newspapers in India
