= Kandathil Varghese Mappillai =

Indian journalist

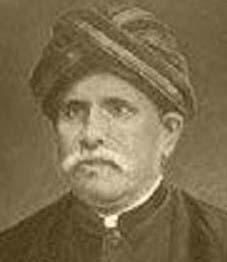

Kandathil Varghese Mappillai (1857 – 6 July 1904) was an Indian journalist, translator and publisher who was the founder of the newspaper Malayala Manorama and the magazine Bhashaposhini.

== Early life ==
Varghese Mappillai was born in 1857 as the fourth son of Kandathil Eapen Mappillai to a Malankara orthodox church family. He studied up to F.A. with the financial support of his father.

After completing his studies, Mappillai began working as a treasury officer (Muthalpadikkaran). Later on he took up the job of a ‘munshi’ (Malayalam teacher) in a CMS School for a short period.

He was the editor of Kerala Mithram which was published in 1881 from Kochi. His journalistic mind and love for literature paved way for establishing the Malayala Manorama Company in 1888. On 22 March 1890, (M.E 1065, Meenam 10th) the first issue of Malayala Manorama was published.

== Literary contributions ==
The Malayalam language and journalism were the soul and spirit of Varghese Mappillai. Under his leadership and vision Malayala Manorama progressed. He utilized the media to nourish and flourish Malayalam language and literature. Kattakayam Cherian Mappillai, Kottarathil Sankunni, K. C. Kesava Pillai and C. S. Subramaniam Potti were his close associates. Varghese Mappillai became an established writer at a very young age. The Malayalam Primer for Children written by Varghese Mappillai was, however, not known to many.

The drama Abrayakutty, an independent Malayalam translation of William Shakespeare’s The Taming of the Shrew, and Keerthanamala were some of the contributions by him to Malayalam literature. Varghese Mappillai formed an association for Malayalam writers called Kavisamajam. He also formed an association called Bhashaposhini which later on became a magazine encouraging literature and language.

Varghese Mappillai also made noteworthy contributions in reforming the Malayalam alphabet. He died on 6 July 1904 (M.E. 1079, Mithunam 23), at the young age of 47.
