= Varthamanam (newspaper) =

Indian newspaper

- Type: Newspaper
- Publisher: Sukumar Azhikode
- Editor-in-chief: Sukumar Azhikode
- Founded: 2003
- Headquarters: Kozhikode
- Website: varthamanam.com

Varthamanam is a Malayalam Newspaper printed and published from Kozhikode, Kerala, India since 2003. Sukumar Azhikode was the chief editor of the paper. Varthamanam newspaper began its journey with two editions-Calicut and Doha. The Doha Edition was launched under the patronage and sponsorship of Dar-Al-Sharq, one of Qatar's most important local newspapers. In 2008, Varthamanam established its independent bureau in Doha under the leadership of K. Mohammed Esa, a well-known Keralite businessman. Rayees K served as the Editorial In-Charge. Over the years, Varthamanam and Madhyamam emerged as two of the leading Indian newspapers in Qatar, widely read among the expatriate Malayali community.
