= Shalom (TV channel) =

Shalom TV
- Logo used since 2005
- Country: India, Asia, Europe, United States
- Broadcast area: World wide
- Headquarters: Peruvannamoozhi, Perambra, Kozhikode District, Kerala

Programming
- Language: Malayalam
- Picture format: 576i SDTV

Ownership
- Owner: Shalom Communications Ltd
- Key people: Benny Punnathara (Chairman)

History
- Launched: 1998; 28 years ago(programming block); 2005 March; 21 years ago
- Founder: Benny Punnathara

Links
- Website: www.shalomtv.tv

Shalom TV is an Indian Malayalam-language free to air television channel based in the state of Kerala. It broadcasts programming catering primarily to a Catholic Christian audience.

In addition to liturgical content, Shalom Television airs a variety of other shows, including interviews, musical programs, competitions, quiz shows, chat shows, short films, and programs focused on family life.

== History ==
Shalom was first introduc a small prayer group. It was founded by Saint Thomas Christians and was subsequently expanded in 1998 as a programming block on Asianet channel. It was officially launched as an independent channel in March 2005. The channel, further expanded in publishing media including Shalom Times, Shalom Tidings and Sunday Shalom. The channel has expanded its operation worldwide, including Australia, United Kingdom and North America.

== See also ==
- Catholic television
- Catholic television channels
- Catholic television networks
- Padre Pio TV
