= P. Gopalan =

Indian politician

Member of the Kerala Legislative Assembly for Punalur
- In office 1957–1960

Member of the Travancore-Cochin Legislative Assembly
- In office 1954–1956

Personal details
- Born: July 16, 1906
- Died: March 31, 1986 (aged 79)
- Party: Communist Party of India
- Occupation: Politician

P. Gopalan (16 July 1906 – 31 March 1986) was an Indian politician and leader of Communist Party of India. He represented Punalur constituency in 1st KLA. He was also Member at Travancore Cochin Legislative Assembly from 1954 to 1956.
