= Sunday Shalom =

Malaysian newspaper

- Sunday Shalom
- Type: Weekly newspaper
- Format: Broadsheet
- Owner: Shalom Trust
- Publisher: Geevarghese Divannasios Ottathengil
- Editor-in-chief: Benny Punnathara
- Founded: 1999
- Language: Malayalam
- Headquarters: Peruvannamoozhi, Kozhikode, Kerala
- Website: www.sundayshalom.com

Sunday Shalom is a Christian weekly newspaper published in both Malayalam and English languages. It is considered as the first weekly newspaper in Malayalam language. The newspaper was established in 1999 with the aim of educating people about Catholic Church and other Christian Churches and various areas of Christian life. The newspaper covers religious events and articles from worldwide.

== History as Timeline ==
- 1989 : A small group of men, under the leadership of Benny Punnathara, starts informal prayer gathering
- 1991 : Shalom Times first magazine in Malayalam starts publishing
- 1996 : Shalom Tidings first English magazine starts publishing
- 1997 : Launched Shalom internet ministry – reaching all world
- 1998 : Shalom Vision starts telecasting; and entry into Television broadcasting
- 1999 : Sunday Shalom, a weekly newspaper is published in Malayalam
- 2005 : Shalom Television broadcasting 24/7
- 2010 : Sunday Shalom starts publishing from USA with English and Malayalam features

== Publications ==
| Name | Frequency | Language | Type |
|---|---|---|---|
| Shalom Times | Monthly | Malayalam; Tamil | Spiritual |
| Shalom Tidings | Bimonthly | English | Spiritual |

== Other Foundations ==
1. Shalom Television
2. Sophia Books
3. Shalom Institute of Media Sciences
4. Shalom Mobile Bookstore
