= Radio Dum Dum =

Programming
- Format: Internet radio

History
- First air date: September 2005

Links
- Website: radiodumdum.com

Radio Dum Dum was a radio station from Kerala, India that played Malayalam music. The radio station had a desktop player.

== History ==
Radio Dum Dum started its operations in September 2005, by a group of people with careers in entertainment and information technology in Kochi. Its objective was to make non-resident Indians have ties with Kerala. In response to feedback, Radio Dum Dum expanded its streaming support to include operating systems beyond Windows, incorporating macOS and Linux OS.

Operations stopped in March 2011, leading to the redirection of their website to a placeholder.

== Re-launch ==
Dum Dum Media Works FZC relaunched the brand as an online media streaming platform on 15 April 2014, with multiple platforms such as web players, desktop applications, and social media apps for Facebook and Google+. A mobile app version was also produced for iOS, Android and Windows.

== Multi-lingual broadcasting ==
Radio Dum Dum introduced multi-lingual broadcasting to widen its audience. This enabled users to choose their preferred broadcast based on location, language and mood.
