= P. K. Sreenivasan =

Indian politician

P. K. Sreenivasan (February 1930 – 7 May 1996) was an Indian politician and leader of Communist Party of India. He represented Punalur constituency in 5th KLA and 6th KLA. He was also elected to 10th KLA but expired before declaration of result. His son P. S. Supal is the current MLA of Punalur Constituency.
