= Nidhiry Mani Kathanar =

Indian Syro-Malabar Catholic bishop (1842–1904)

Mar Emmanuel Nidhiri
- Vicar-General of Syro Malabar Catholic Church
- Church: Syro Malabar Catholic Church
- Predecessor: Kuriakose Elias Chavara
- Successor: Aloysius Pazheparambil

Personal details
- Born: Emmanuel; 27 May 1842 Kuravilangad, Kingdom of Travancore, British India (present day Kottayam, Kerala, India)
- Died: 20 June 1904 (aged 62) Kuravilangad, Kingdom of Travancore, British India (present-day Kottayam, Kerala, India)
- Buried: Marth Mariam Church, Kuravilangadu

Mar Emmanuel Nidhiri (27 May 1842 – 20 June 1904), also known as Nidhiry Mani Kathanar, was a significant figure in the history of the Syrian Malabar Nasrani church in Kerala. He led his community against the European hegemony over the Saint Thomas Christians and was accepted by the factions in the Kerala church. Nidhiri was the second Vicar General of the Syro-Malabar Catholic Church.

Nidhiri founded the Nazranee Deepika, which was the forerunner of today's Deepika newspaper, and was instrumental in the founding the Malayala Manorama. Furthermore, Nidhiri had a role in organizing the Malayali Memorial— one of the first steps in the social transformation of Kerala —and was a key figure in opening up his community to English education.

In 1969, as a tribute to his contribution to Malayalam literature, the Kerala Literary Academy unveiled his portrait in the Academy Hall in Trichur, Kerala.

== Life ==
Born into a rich agrarian family on 27 May 1842, in Kuravilangad, Nidhiri entered spiritual service at the age of 19 as a deacon, the title of which he worked under for 14 years, before he was ordained priest in 1876.

Nidhiri lived during a delicate period in the history of the Syro-Malabar Church; the church was subdued by the Latin hierarchy and was struggling to become a Major Archiepiscopal Church. During this time, the Indian people were revolting against the British administration for independence, and Nidhiri had to confront and respond to the struggles of freedom from the community against the British dynasty and its ecclesial desire to become an autonomous church.

Kathanar died on 20 June 1904, due to Cirrhosis.

== Contributions ==
- Education: Nidhiri was one of the key figures in the opening up of English education to Kerala as well as to the Syriac Catholic community. He advised Catholic parishes to sell crucifixes made of gold and silver and to invest the amount into the opening of schools.
- Media: Nidhiri was the founder and editor of the first Malayalam daily, Deepika, and was instrumental in the founding of another newspaper, the Malayala Manorama.
- Social Reforms: Nidhiri was one of the main forces behind the Malayali Memorial of 1891, which was one of the first steps in the social transformation of Kerala. Following the formation of the Travancore Legislative Council in 1888, the Malayali Memorial, a memorandum bearing the signatures of over 10,000 people, including those of Ezhavas, Christians, and Muslims, was submitted to the Maharajah, Moolam Thirunal. This was a result of the emergence of a Tamil Brahmin monopoly of policy positions in government and the subsequent decline of caste groups from within Kerala.
- Poet and Writer: Nidhiri wrote number of poems and authored three Malayalam books.
- Ecumenicalism: The ecumenical association, Nasrani Jathiaikya Sangham, organized by Nidhiri and Mar Dionysius, the Malankara Church Metropolitan, was one of the important happenings in Syrian Christians history. They acquired property at Kottayam for building a college in 1875, and planned for the opening of colleges, schools, orphanages, libraries, banks, etc. The project was aborted by the diplomatic approach of the Carmelite apostolic delegate Aiuti who was afraid of unity among the Syrian Christians. It was the leadership of Nidhiri that fostered a unity among the Syriac Catholics from within and with the Jacobites.
- Apologist of faith: Nidhiri led his community in its fight against the European hegemony over the Nasrani Christians. It was in this fight with the Syriac Catholics under the leadership of Nidhiri that freed the people from Padroado jurisdiction, paving the way for indigenous Bishops.
- Historian: Nidhiri had also authored a number of religious historical texts and was on the forefront of upholding the Chaldean patrimony of the Syro-Malabar Catholic Church.
