= T. P. Sreenivasan =

Indian diplomat and professor

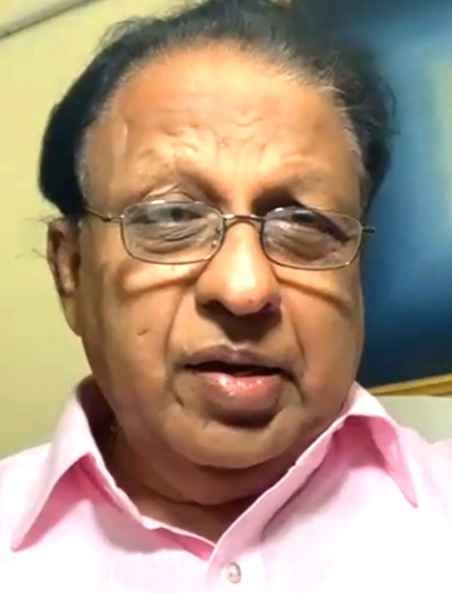
T.P. Sreenivasan

Thettalil Parameswaran Pillai Sreenivasan (born 17 June 1944 in Kayamkulam, Travancore) is an Indian former diplomat and is the head of the Council for Higher Education of the State of Kerala and also an adjunct professor of eminence at Somaiya Vidyavihar University.

== Career and life ==
Sreenivasan was born in Kayamkulam as the son of K. Parameswaran Pillai, a school teacher and N. Chellamma. After school and studies at University College, part of the University of Kerala, in Thiruvananthapuram, he joined the Indian Foreign Service (IFS batch, 1967). He is alma Mater of Government Boys' Higher Secondary School, Kayamkulam.

He was secretary of legation third class in Tokyo and legation secretary first class in Thimphu, Bhutan. From 1975 to 1977, he was secretary of legation first class in Moscow. From 1986 to 1989, he was Indian High Commissioner in Suva, Fiji and responsible for seven other island nations in the South Pacific. From 1992 to 1995, he was the Deputy Permanent Representative of India to the UN in New York; from 1995 to 1997, he assumed the office of the Indian High Commissioner in Nairobi, Kenya and served as Permanent Representative of the Government of India at the United Nations Office at Nairobi. From 1997 to 2000 he was Deputy Ambassador in Washington, D.C.

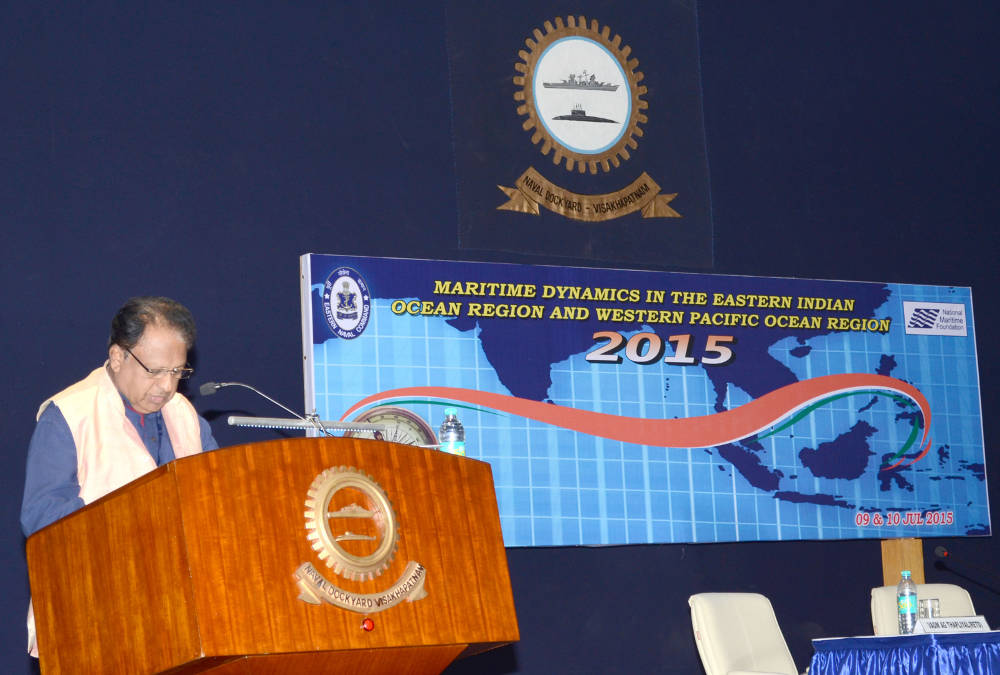

From 2000 to 2004, he was Indian Ambassador in Vienna for Austria and Slovenia, as well as Permanent Representative of India to the United Nations and the International Atomic Energy Agency, Vienna. He retired 30 June 2004.

Sreenivasan was the head of the Council for Higher Education of the State of Kerala and executive vice president with the rank of vice-chancellor.

He has continued as a columnist for a variety of newspapers and magazines (see Rediff archive), as is the nonfiction author of autobiographical works to his 37-year diplomatic career. He had been married to Lekha Sreenivasan, a Bharatanatyam dancer and teacher, from 1968 until January 2023, when she died. The couple had two sons.

== Books ==
- Encounters. Rhythm House, Selangor, Malaysia 2007, ISBN 978-983-164-546-8.
- Words, Words, Words. Adventures in Diplomacy. Pearson Longman, Delhi 2008, ISBN 978-81-317-6058-1.
- Mattering to India. The Shashi Tharoor campaign. Pearson, Delhi 2011, ISBN 978-81-317-5944-8.
- Applied diplomacy. Through the prism of mythology. Wisdom Tree, New Delhi 2014, ISBN 978-81-8328-381-6.
