= Pravasi Express =

Singapore bilingual newspaper

- Type: Fortnight newspaper
- Owner: Pravasi Publications
- Publisher: Pravasi Publications
- Editor-in-chief: Rajesh Kumar
- Founded: 2012
- Language: Malayalam, English
- Headquarters: Singapore
- Website: www.pravasiexpress.com

Pravasi Express is a bilingual newspaper (in Malayalam and English) publishing from Singapore. Formed in 2012, the newspaper presents news from various categories like Singapore news, Kerala news, world news, entertainment, lifestyle, arts and culture, technology, sports and movies.

== Pravasi Express Awards ==
The Pravasi Express Awards was introduced in 2013 during the one year successful completion of the Pravasi Express Newspaper. The awards were given to appreciate Malayalee personalities for their invaluable commitment and contributions to the society and arts. The first awards were presented on 4 August 2013 in a public function at Spring Auditorium, Singapore with over 500 guests. The absence of Former Chief Minister of Kerala V. S. Achuthanandan was a show stealer, but the ceremony turned out to be a fabulous one with colourful performances by artists from Singapore and India. Former Chief Minister was supposed to be the chief guest of the event and was also about to receive the Pravasi Express "Life Achievement Award" in the ceremony.

=== 2017 Awards ===
Pravasi Express Awards 2017 were awarded in "Pravasi Express Nite 2017" held at Singapore with the honorable presence of Kerala Minister for Culture and Law Mr. AK Balan, Singapore Indian High Commissioner Mr.Javed Ashraf and Pravasi Express Chief Editor Mr.Rajesh Kumar. Minister Mr. AK Balan presided over the function and also inaugurated the 60th anniversary celebrations of Kairalee Kala Nilayam, Singapore. Veteran Film actor Madhu (actor) was honored with the "Pravasi Express Life Time Achievement Award" for his contribution to Malayalam film industry and Football Legend IM Vijayan was awarded with "Pravasi Express Life Time Sports Excellence Award".

=== 2016 Awards ===
Pravasi Express Awards 2016 were presented in "Pravasi Express Nite-2016" held at Kallang Theatre on 6 August 2016 by Ambassador-at-Large Gopinatha Pillai. The event was preceded over by Pravasi Express editor-in-chief G Rajesh Kumar and K B Ganesh Kumar, film actor and former Kerala minister was the guest of honour. The award function was followed by a musical treat led by G Venugopal and drama by Sri Narayana Kala Nilayam, Singapore.

=== 2014 Awards ===
The awards were presented by Ambassador-at-Large Gopinatha Pillai, Actress Priyamani, All Malaysia Malayalee Association president Ravindran Menon and other famous personalities from India and Singapore.

=== 2013 Awards ===
Pravasi Express Awards 2016 were presented by Ambassador-at-Large Gopinatha Pillai, lyrist Anil Panachooran, actor Unni Mukundan and many other famous personalities in Singapore.

== Pravasi Express Souvenir ==
Pravasi Express Souvenir is the annual literary magazine of Pravasi Express introduced in 2014. The souvenir edition always showcased prominent Malayalam writers from all over the world with their masterpieces.

Souvenir	Year
PravasiExpress Onappathippu 2016] (പ്രവാസി എക്സ്പ്രസ് ഓണപ്പതിപ്പ് 2016)	2016
PravasiExpress Souvenir 2014	2014
