= Kerala Janatha =

Malayalam language morning daily newspaper

Kerala Janatha was a Malayalam language morning daily newspaper published from Thiruvananthapuram, India. The newspaper was published by Kerala Janatha Printers & Publishers (Pvt.), Ltd. It was published daily, except Mondays.

Pattom A. Thanu Pillai founded Kerala Janatha as a Praja Socialist Party organ in 1957. As of 1957 Pattom A. Thanu Pillai served as chief editor and K. Krishna Pillai was the publisher. In its heyday, it was one of the major newspapers in Kerala. In its early period it claimed a circulation of 9,017. As of the mid-1960s, K. Krishna Pillai was the managing editor of the newspaper. Kerala Janatha carried 8 pages. It measured 20 x 16 inches.

By 1967 it claimed a circulation of 6,362, out of whom 5,917 would be subscribers.
