= Kerala Mithram =

- Type: Newspaper
- Owner(s): Devji Bheemji
- Editor-in-chief: Kandathil Varghese Mappillai
- Associate editor: T.G. Paily
- Founded: 1881
- Language: Malayalam
- Headquarters: Cochin, Kerala, India

Kerala Mithram was one of the earliest Malayalam language newspaper published from Cochin, Kerala, India during 1881. It was printed in the beginning of the month as three, then one week later. Devji Bhimji, from Gujarat was the patron of the newspaper. Kandathil Varghese Mappillai, the founder of Malayala Manorama, was editor-in-Chief and T.G. Paily was deputy editor.
