= General (newspaper) =

Malayalam language newspaper in India

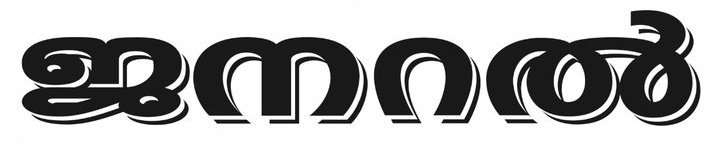

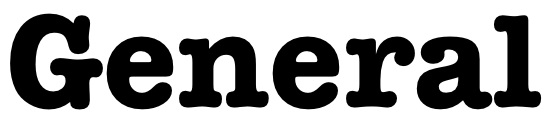
- Type: Daily newspaper
- Format: Broadsheet
- Publisher: Johny Chandy
- Editor-in-chief: Johny Chandy
- Founded: 1976
- Political alignment: Neo-liberal, Pro-Congress
- Language: Malayalam
- Headquarters: Thrissur
- Circulation: 1,25,000 daily
- Price: Rs. 5
- Website: Generaldaily.com

General (Malayalam: ജനറൽ) is a Malayalam language newspaper printed daily and published from the City of Thrissur, Kerala in India.

== Editions ==
- City of Thrissur
- Online

== Timeline ==
- 1976 "General" founded
- 1976 First issue of General was published on 21 May

== See also ==
- List of newspapers in India by circulation
- List of newspapers in the world by circulation
