= Mohammed Abdur Rahiman =

Indian politician

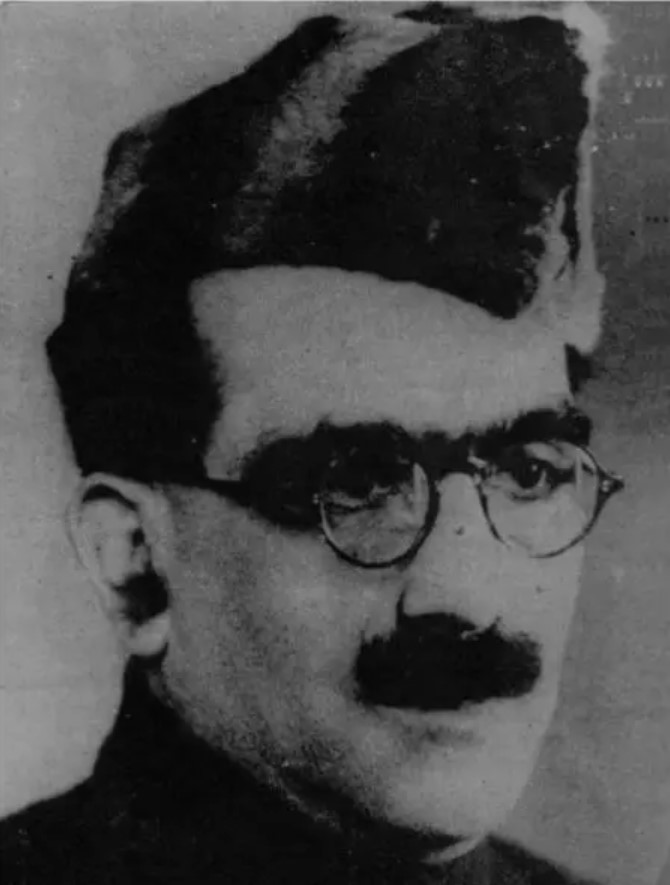
- Born: Abdur Rahiman; 1898; Kodungallur, Kingdom of Cochin, Kerala, British India
- Died: 23 November 1945; Pottashery, British India
- Other name: Mohammed Abdur Rahiman Sahib
- Education: Graduate
- Occupation: Editor
- Employer: Al Ameen
- Known for: Indian independence movement activism and reorganising
- Political party: All India Forward Bloc Indian National Congress

Mohammed Abdur Rahiman Sahib (1898 – 23 November 1945) was an Indian freedom fighter from Kerala. He was a member of the Madras Legislative Assembly. As president of Kerala Pradesh Congress Committee(Malabar) in 1939 he played a key role in setting up the Indian National Congress in Kerala.

== Early life and education ==
Sahib was born at Azhikode, Kodungallur, Thrissur District in 1898 in the Kingdom of Cochin, India. He completed his schooling at Veniyambadi and Calicut. He attended college at Madras and Aligarh but discontinued his studies at Aligarh University to participate in Non-co-operation movement and Khilafat movement in Malabar.

== Struggles and imprisonments ==
Following the Moplah Riots of 1921, Sahib worked towards establishing peace in riot affected areas but was arrested and sentenced to two years imprisonment in October 1921 by the British authorities. For his participation in the Salt Satyagraha of 1930 where he participated in the breaking of the salt law on the Calicut beach, he was lathicharged and sentenced to nine months rigorous imprisonment and lodged at the Kannur Central Jail. Abdur Rahiman Sahib was jailed again from 1940 to 1945 by the British Raj.

== Editor ==
Mohammed Abdur Rahiman was editor and publisher of the Malayalam daily Al Ameen which was published from Calicut during 1924–1939. The paper aimed to strengthen the freedom movement and nurture nationalism among the Muslims of Malabar. However conservatives in the community opposed to his progressive views conspired with the colonial authorities to repeatedly disrupt its publication. The paper was finally closed down in 1939 by the British authorities. According to a local legend, an anonymous admirer of his offered him valuable jewellery to restart the paper after it closed but he refused it.

== Politics ==
Sahib was a member of Calicut Municipal Council from 1931 to 1934 and the Malabar District Board of Madras Presidency from 1932. He was elected to Madras Presidency from Malappuram constituency in 1937. He became President of Kerala Pradesh Congress Committee (KPCC) and a member of All India Congress Committee (AICC) in 1939. Mohammed Abdur Rahiman always opposed the Two-Nation Theory of the All-India Muslim League and he was the leader of Nationalist Muslims in Kerala. His last days were spent convening meetings and creating awareness among Muslims against the division of India. For this, he suffered a lot from the Muslim League Party in Malabar.

== Death ==
After the release from jail in 1945, he returned to Calicut and started active participation in Congress activities. He died on 23 November 1945 aged 47 at Pottashery village near Chennamangallur (in the present-day Kozhikode district) just after addressing a public meeting at Kodiyathur. The medical records state that he died of a massive heart attack, but still some others believe that he was poisoned.

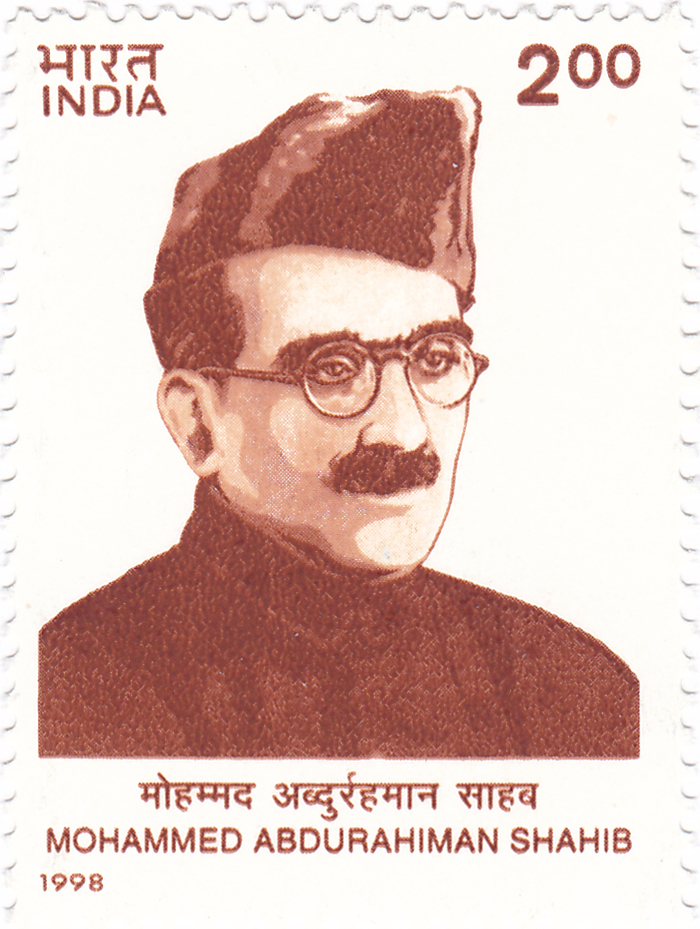
A 1998 commemorative stamp in honour of Abdur Rahiman

== Commemoration ==
In 1998, the Department of Posts and Telegraph issued a commemorative stamp in his honour. The Muhammed Abdurahiman Memorial Orphanage College, Mukkom and the Mohammed Abdur Rahiman Sahib Academy, Kozhikode have been named after him.

Poet Edasseri Govindan Nair immortalised Mohammed Abdur Rahiman Sahib in his famous poem Muhammed Abdurahiman which is acclaimed for both its poetic and lyrical qualities. The poem refers to historic events and the valiant role he played against the British and the stance he took against partition. Akkitham Achuthan Namboodiri's poem Maranamillatha Manushyan that dwells on religious amity and the need to imbibe the spirit of the Koran was written in memory of Sahib.

The Kerala government took over his house at Eriad, Kodungallur and converted it into a museum that showcases his life and contributions.

== In popular culture ==
In 2011, the Malayalam film Veeraputhran, based on N.P. Mohammed's book Mohammed Abdurahiman Oru Novel, was released. Directed by P. T. Kunju Muhammed, it had the actor Narain playing Abdur Rahiman Sahib. The movie became controversial after writer Hameed Chennamangaloor alleged it of insinuating that Sahib was poisoned to death while medical reports and Sahib's official biography state that he died of a heart attack. The Indian Union Muslim League also expressed its reservations over its depiction in the film.
