= Rajyasamacharam =

First Malayalam journal

- Editor: Rev. Dr. Hermann Gundert
- First issue: June 1847
- Final issue: December 1850
- Company: Basal Evangelical Mission society (BMS)
- Country: India
- Based in: Illikkunnu

Rajyasamacharam or Rajya Samacharam was the first Malayalam journal published in Kerala. Its first issue came out in June 1847. Hermann Gundert, the editor of the journal, was an educator in the Basel Evangelical Mission society. Rajyasamacharam started publication from Illikkunnu, Thalassery, in the Kannur district of Kerala. It was published as eight cyclostyled sheets in demy octavo size produced from a litho press. The pages were without columns or cross heads and was in simple language. It was distributed free of cost.

It helped in formulating the Malayalee reader's viewpoints against caste distinction and related injustices.

It ceased publication in December 1850 and a total of 42 issues were published.

In October 1847, Gundert started another publication called Paschimodayam. It was also cyclostyled. It carried articles on history, natural science, geography and astrology. The other works of Gundert were Malayalabhaasha Vyakaranam, a Malayalam grammar book, and the first Malayalam English dictionary. He also translated the Bible into Malayalam.
