= Al Ameen (newspaper) =

Indian Malayalam-language newspaper

- Founder: Mohammed Abdur Rahiman
- Founded: October 12, 1924; 101 years ago
- Ceased publication: 1939
- Language: Malayalam
- Headquarters: Calicut
- Country: British India

Al Ameen was a Malayalam language newspaper founded in 1924 by Mohammed Abdur Rahiman in Calicut, India. It continued its publication until 1939 when it was banned by the Madras government for campaigning in support of India's non-cooperation in World War II.

== History ==
Mohammed Abdur Rahiman registered Al-Ameen Company in Calicut in 1923. The first issue of Al Ameen newspaper came out on 12 October 1924, on Prophet Muhammad's birthday. The first issue was published with a message from Vallathol Narayana Menon. The newspaper was started to support the Indian independence movement and Khilafat Movement, and allegedly to reform Malabar's Muslim community. Abdur Rahiman's statement in Mathrubhumi about Al Ameen reads: "In Al-Ameen, along with the local news and telegraphic messages, there will be various articles borrowed from English, Arabic, Urdu and Tamil newspapers in India and abroad. It will be very helpful to know about the news related to Indian National Congress and Khilafat Movement. The opinions published by Mohammad Ali Jauhar in The Comrade will be carried in Al-Ameen also.

Initially published as a tri-weekly, Al Ameen became a daily in 1930. In the period of activities of the Indian freedom struggle, Al Ameen crticized the British rule. The Madras government confiscated the Al Ameen's press in August 1930. Al Ameen resumed publication in November 1930, but soon became a tri-weekly due to financial issues. In March 1939, it started publishing as a daily again. It continued publication as a daily until September 1939 when it was banned by the Madras government for campaigning in support of India's non-cooperation in World War II.

== Legacy ==
Al Ameen is considered to have contributed to the development of political journalism in Kerala. It is cited in studies of the regional press and its role in the Indian independence movement.

The newspaper is also associated with the legacy of its founder, Mohammed Abdur Rahiman, a nationalist leader and journalist in Kerala.
