= Paschimodayam =

Malayalam magazine

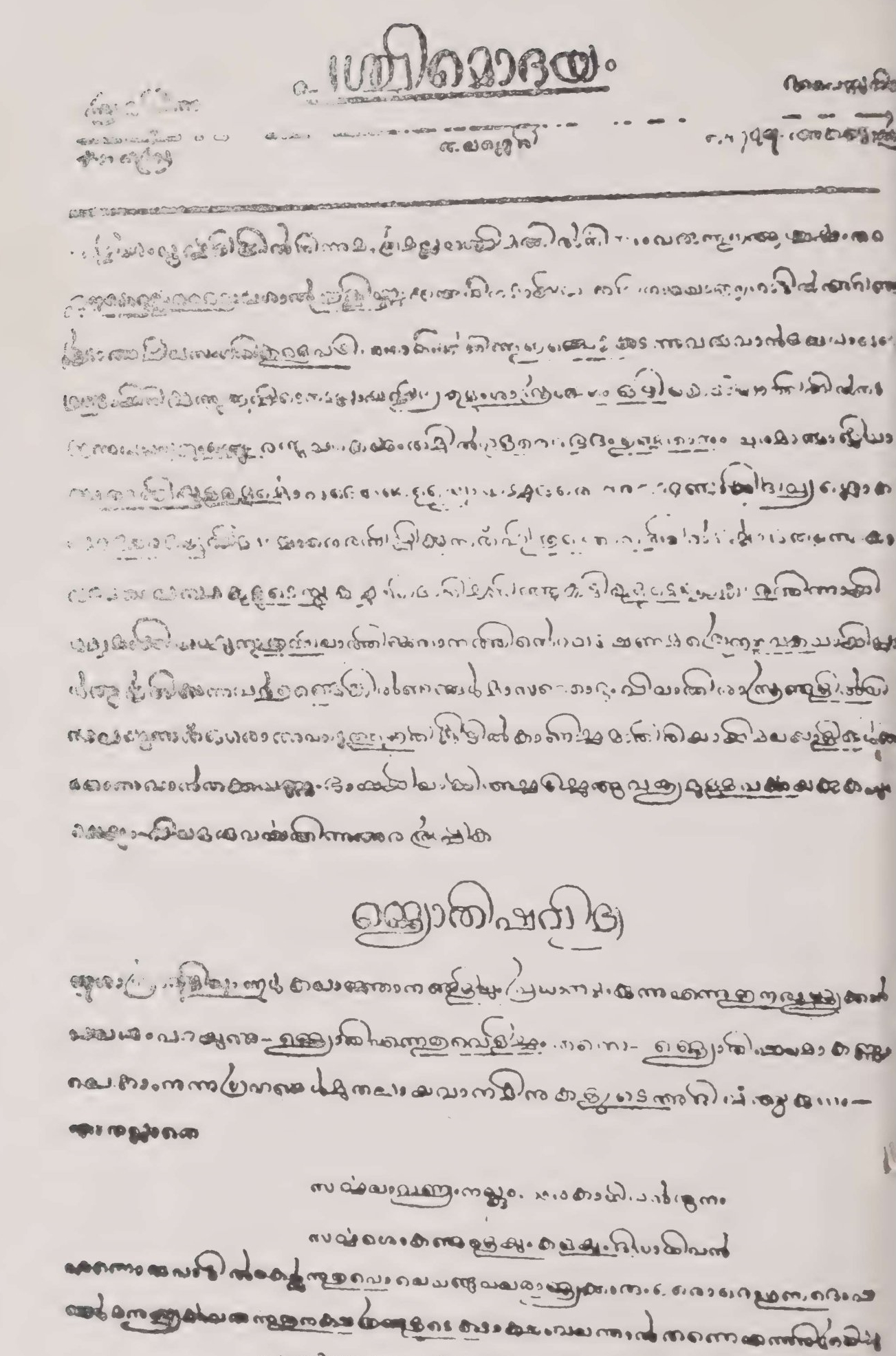
- Editor: George Frederick Muller
- First issue: October 1847
- Final issue: August 1851
- Country: India

Paschimodayam was the second Malayalam magazine published in Kerala. Its first issue came out in October 1847. The owners of the journal were the Basel Mission Society. The structure of Paschimodayam was similar to Rajyasamacharam, the first Malayalam magazine. But in addition to Christian contents, there were articles published on science, history, astronomy, and geography.

== Overview ==
Paschimodayam was an eight-page publication and cost two paisa. The annual subscription cost ₹ 1. It had a better appearance than Rajyasamacharam and was printed on royal octavo garb (234mm x 156mm) size paper. George Frederick Muller served as its editor and the publication is thought to have ceased by 1851.
