= Hermann Gundert =

German missionary, scholar, and linguist

Dr. Hermann Gundert
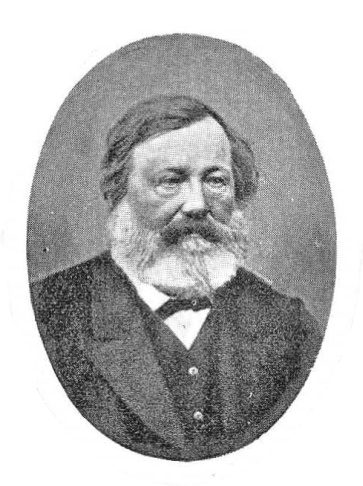
- Born: 4 February 1814; Stuttgart, Württemberg
- Died: 25 April 1893 (aged 79); Calw, Württemberg, German Empire
- Monuments: Gundert Statue, Tellichery
- Organization: Basel Mission
- Known for: Proselytizing Christianity, Contributions to Malayalam language
- Parents: Ludwig Gundert (father); Christiana Enslin (mother)
- Relatives: Hermann Hesse (grandson)

Hermann Gundert (Stuttgart, 4 February 1814 – 25 April 1893) was a German missionary, scholar, and linguist, as well as the maternal grandfather of German novelist and Nobel laureate Hermann Hesse. Gundert is chiefly known for his contributions as an Indologist, and compiled a Malayalam grammar book, Malayalabhaasha Vyakaranam (1859), in which he developed and constricted the grammar spoken by the Malayalis, nowadays; a Malayalam-English dictionary (1872), and contributed to work on Bible translations into Malayalam. He worked primarily at Tellicherry on the Malabar coast, in present day Kerala, India. Gundert also contributed to the fields of history, geography and astronomy. Gundert gave the famous epithet "God's own country" to Kerala seeing the beauty of the land while he traveled from Kunnamkulam to Mangalore on a boat.

== Early years ==
Hermann Gundert was born to Ludwig Gundert and Christiana Enslin, and was the couple's third child. His father was the secretary of the Bible Society and started a missionary magazine in 1823, which gave the young Gundert his first experiences in printing and publishing. At the age of five Hermann entered Latin school in Stuttgart, joined the "Lower Seminary" at Maulbronn in 1827 and later entered the "higher seminary" – the Protestant Stift – at the University of Tübingen. In 1835 he obtained a doctoral degree in philology from Tübingen and successfully completed his theological studies. In the course of his education, Gundert mastered Hebrew, Latin, English, and French at a young age.

== Journey to India and marriage ==
Having been engaged as a private tutor in Calcutta, India, he prepared for this job in England. In April 1836 he left Bristol with the party of his employer. While travelling on the ship he concentrated on learning Bengali, Hindustani and Telugu and taught these languages to his fellow passengers. Instead of Calcutta the party reached Madras (Chennai) in July 1836 and settled there. Gundert immediately started learning Tamil. Soon he was giving a duty in Tirunelveli, and after some time in Chittoor (in nowadays Andhra Pradesh). There he married Julie Dubois in July 1838. She originated from French-speaking Switzerland and had come to India in the same party. After marriage, the two left for Tirunelveli, and on the way they were invited to join the Basel Mission in Mangalore. They accepted, and en route Gundert left Tamil drawing ups with a printer in Nagercoil. In Trivandrum (Thiruvananthapuram) Hermann Gundert had an audience with His Highness Sree Swathi Thirunal Maharaja, the ruler of Travancore. Most probably it was here he heard Malayalam for the first time.

== In Kerala ==
In November 1838 Gundert and his wife reached Mangalore. From there he visited Cannanore (Kannur), Tellicherry (Thalassery) and the cinnamon plantation near Anjarakandy. He lived in Thalassery for around 20 years. He learned the language from well-established local teachers Uracheri Gurukkanmar from Chokli, a village near Thalassery and consulted them in his works. He also translated the Bible into Malayalam. T. L. Strange, a British judge, offered his bungalow on Illikkunnu near Tellicherry to the Basel Mission on condition that a mission station will be established over there. The Gunderts moved there and took up work in April 1839. In August 1839, Gundert stated that he had studied Malayalam intensively and that he had established the first Malayalam school on the veranda of the bungalow in May. At the same time, his wife started the first girls' institute with boarding. In the following months, Gundert opened Malayalam schools in Kadirur, Thalassery Fort, Mahe, and Dharmadam. Regularly he visited all these schools and invited the teachers to Illikkunnu for further education. At times Gundert had five Pandits in his house, discussing old Indian history, philosophy and religion and studying classical Indian literature. At his numerous visits to the villages around Tellicherry, Gundert got in close contact with the people, collected as many words, phrases and proverbs as possible and spread the Gospel. During this period, he published around thirteen books in Malayalam. Many of the material – old Malayalam documents and scriptures from Tellicherry and other places in Malabar – which Gundert had collected he later gave to the University of Tübingen.

In the beginning of 1857, the government appointed Gundert as the first Inspector of Schools in Malabar and Canara – from Calicut (Kozhikode) in the South till Hubli in the North. He appointed teachers, wrote textbooks for schools, colleges and the newly established Madras University and also compiled examination papers. In Kerala, Gundert is venerated for his deep interest in the local culture as well as the development of the Malayalam language, for compiling grammatical books for school starters as well as for the university level. These grammars were the prominent non-Sanskrit-based approaches to real Indian grammar. Gundert is held in high regard to this day among linguistic experts in Kerala for the high scholastic aptitude exhibited in his work.

== Scholarly work ==
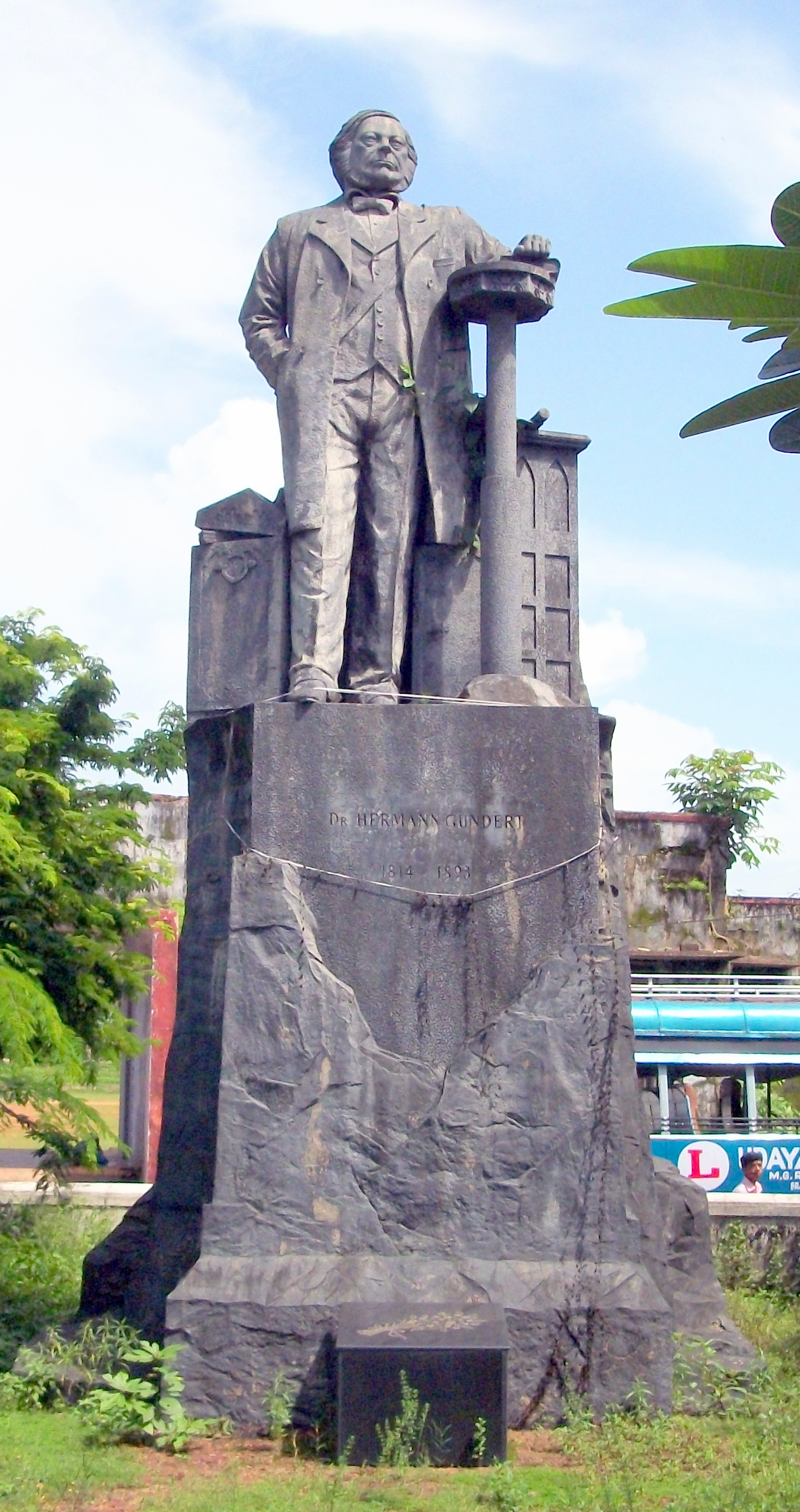
Gundert's statue near Thalassery Stadium

During his stay in Illikunnu near Tellicherry (Thalassery), he published around thirteen books in Malayalam including a translation of the Bible, Old Testament from Hebrew and New Testament from Greek. The archives of information he collected from Tellicherry are kept in the University of Tübingen and were collected and compiled by the scholar Dr. Scaria Zacharia as Thalassery Rekhakal.

In Kerala, he took a deep interest in the local culture and the Malayalam language, attempting a systematic grammar of the language. This was one of the prominent non-Sanskrit-based approaches to Indic grammar. Gundert considered Malayalam to have diverged from Proto-Tamil–Malayalam, or Proto-Dravidian. Apart from the early inscriptions found on copper and stone, Gundert traced Malayalam to the Rāma Charitam, a poem predating the Sanskrit alphabet.

Gundert is highly regarded among linguistic experts and his dictionary has been described as "monumental" in a review of the work on Dravidian languages.

== Publications ==
Year published	Title	Description
1843	Keralolpathi	Origin of Kerala, translation from Malayalam Keralolpathi.
1845	Pazhancholmala	String of Malayalam proverbs for Christian theological idioms.
1851	Malayala Bhasha Viyakaranam	Malayalam Grammar
1860	Paathamala	First textbook in Malayalam
1868	Kerala pazhama	33 years of Malayali history, from Vasco da Gama's arrival in 1498 (an English translation has been published by T Madhava Menon in 2003)
1868	New Testament	Translation of the New Testament in Malayalam
1870	School Dictionary	
1872	Malayalam-English Dictionary	
1879	Malayalarajyam	The land of Malayalam
1847 June	Rajyasamacharam (News of the Kingdom)	Newspaper
1847 October	Paschimodayam	"Rise of the West" or "Dawn of the West", a magazine
1881	Sankeerthanangal	"The Book of Psalms" translated by Gundert

== Other contributions ==
- He was the one who introduced the punctuation marks – full stop, comma, semicolon, colon, and question mark – into the Malayalam language.
- Malayalam-English Dictionary. He returned to Germany in 1859. There he took ten more years to complete the dictionary. (1872) A number of words in this dictionary are not in use these days. But this is a priceless treasure for those who study the development of Malayalam.

== Years in Germany ==
Due to poor health Gundert had to leave India in 1859. In Calw, the Black Forest, he joined the Calw Publishing House and became its director in 1862. He published many books and articles as well as several magazines, including a children's magazine. Julie Gundert died in Calw on 18 September 1885, and Hermann Gundert on 25 April 1893. Both were buried in the Calw cemetery, where the family grave still exists. The Nobel laureate, Hermann Hesse was his grandson through his daughter, Marie Gundert (1842-1902).

Though Gundert came to Kerala as a missionary, he is remembered today mainly for his literary contributions. In the city of Thalassery (Tellicherry), he has been honored with a statue. The bungalow in which he used to live remained the home of the Nettur Technical Training Foundation (NTTF) for many years. In 2022 The Tourism Department of Kerala converted the Gundert Bungalow into a museum that sheds light on the life and contributions of Hermann Gundert.

== See also ==
- Volbrecht Nagel
- Ferdinand Kittel
- Thunchath Ezhuthachan Malayalam University
- Njattyela Sreedharan
- Gundert Museum
