= List of people from North Malabar =

This is a list of notable people from North Malabar, a historical and cultural area including the former French exclaves of Pondicherry. North Malabar is now administratively at the northern end of Kerala, India.

- Pazhassi Raja (1753–1805), freedom fighter and prince regent of Kottayam princely state
- Cherusseri Namboothiri (c. 1375–c. 1475), poet
- Aromal Chekavar, legendary hero and warrior from the 12th century
- Thacholi Othenan, legendary hero from the 1600s
- Unniyarcha, 12th century warrior
- Chandu Chekavar, 12th century warrior
- A. K. Gopalan (1904–1977), politician, communist leader, MP
- K. Kelappan (1889–1971), social reformer and journalist
- E. K. Nayanar (1919–2004), politician, communist leader and Chief Minister of Kerala
- K. P. R. Gopalan (1906–1997), politician, Naxalite communist leader and MPA
- M. V. Raghavan (1933–2014), politician, communist leader and MPA
- Sankaran Moopan, 18th century chief commander of Pazhassi Raja
- Karayi Krishnan Gurukkal, 19th century scholar
- Dewan E.K Krishnan (1841–1907) 19th century deputy collector
- Janaki Ammal (1897–1984), cytogenetics and phytogeography
- Meenakshi Amma, Kalaripayattu guru and Padma Shri
- Choorayi Kanaran (1812–1876), first deputy collector of India, 19th century
- Rao Sahib Ayyathan Gopalan (1863–1948), social reformer
- Ayyathan Janaki Ammal (1881–1945), first female doctor in Kerala
- I. K. Kumaran (1903–1999), 20th century Mahe freedom fighter
- Vagbhatananda (1885–1939), Hindu social reformer
- Keeleri Kunhikannan (1858–1939), martial arts trainer and circus owner
- S. K. Pottekkatt (1913–1982), Malayalam writer
- Mithavaadi Krishnan, social reformer
- Potheri Kunjambu Vakil (1857–1919), social reformer, writer, royal family lawyer
- Muliyil Krishnan (1845–1901), writer
- Ponnapuramkottayil Kelu Moopan, 17th century warrior
- K. Karunakaran (1918–2010), politician, congress leader and Chief Minister of Kerala
- E. Ahamed (1938–2017), politician, Muslim League leader and Central Cabinet Minister
- Moorkoth Kumaran (1874–1941), teacher and short story writer
- Moorkoth Ramunni (1915–2009), pilot and bureaucrat
- Moorkoth Kunhappa (1905–1993), journalist, editor, novelist
- M. N. Nambiar (1919–2008), film actor and spiritual leader
- Verghese Kurien (1921–2012), social entrepreneur and founder of Amul
- Sreenivasan (1950-2025), film actor, screenwriter, director, and producer
- Kannur Rajan (1949–1995), music composer
- Kuroolli Chekon, 20th century Thiyya warrior
- Kaithapram Damodaran Namboothiri (born 1950), lyricist, music director, actor, singer, screenwriter, and performer of carnatic music
- Gireesh Puthenchery (1961–2010), lyricist and screenwriter
- Vineeth (born 1969), film actor and classical dancer
- K. Raghavan (1913–2013), music composer
- A. T. Ummer (1933–2001), music composer
- Vengayil Kunhiraman Nayanar (1861–1914), journalist, writer, landowner
- Vijay K. Nambiar (born 1943), diplomat
- O. M. Nambiar (1932–2021), athletics coach and winner of the Dronacharya award
- Lt. General Satish Nambiar (born 1936), general and commander of the UNPROFOR force in the former Yugoslavia 1992–93
- Pinarayi Vijayan (born 1944), politician, communist leader, MPA, Chief Minister of Keralam
- Kalingalmadom Rarichan Moopan, social leader
- Kodiyeri Balakrishnan (1953–2022), politician, communist leader, MPA
- Sukumar Azhikode (1926–2012), writer philosopher
- M. Night Shyamalan (born 1970), film director, screenwriter, and producer
- M. Mukundan (born 1942), writer, social activist
- Kavya Madhavan (born 1984), film actress
- Samvrutha Sunil (born 1986), film actress
- Captain C. P. Krishnan Nair (1922–2014), businessman, hotelier
- Anaswara Rajan (born 2002), film actress
- Mattannur Sankarankutty Marar, renowned Chenda artist
