= C. S. Gopala Panicker =

Indian writer (1872–1930)

- Born: 29 May 1872; Kerala, India
- Died: 30 January 1930 (aged 57)
- Occupation: Writer
- Writing career
- Language: Malayalam
- Genre: Short story

C. S. Gopala Panicker (29 May 1872 – 30 January 1930) was a Malayalam-language short story writer from Kerala, India. Along with Vengayil Kunhiraman Nayanar, Oduvil Kunhikrishna Menon, Moorkoth Kumaran, Chenkulath Cheriya Kunhirama Menon (M. R. K. C.) and Ambadi Narayana Poduval, Panicker is regarded as a pioneer of the short story in Malayalam literature.

== Life ==
=== Early life ===
Panicker was born in 1872 as the son of Peringattuveettil Narayana Panicker and Lakshmi Amma in Chittur taluk which is part of the present-day state of Kerala in India.After passing the Middle School Examination from Chittur, he studied at Peruvemba High School near Chittur and passed his matriculation from Palghat Victoria High School. He completed his F.A. (Intermediate) from Calicut Zamorin's Guruvayurappan College (then known as Kerala Vidyashala) and Cochin. He completed a Bachelor of Science degree in zoology from Madras Presidency College in 1896.

=== Career ===
Three months after passing his B.A. degree, Panicker entered the Cochin government service as a clerk in the Land Revenue Department in Ernakulam. In 1897, he became Acting Head Clerk, and in 1898 he became the Acting Shirastadar. With the permission of the government, he also worked as a manager for Edapally royal family for some time. He was gradually appointed as Tehsildar in 1912 and as Stamp Superintendent in 1913. He also served as the Panchayat Registrar. He was the manager of Cochin Thirumala Devaswom for about six years. He retired from government services in 1929. He then briefly worked as the Managing Agent for Nilambur royal family.

=== Personal life and death ===
Apart from being a man of letters, Panicker was also a good actor. He took efforts to restore the gurukalam established by Thunchaththu Ezhuthachan in Chittur. He married his uncle's daughter Chittur Valiyathachattu Meenakshiamma. His daughters, Devaki Nethyaramma, the wife of Cochin Sub-Judge Thampuran, and Dakshayani Kettilamma, the wife of a Thampuran from the Kadathanadu royal family, together translated Taraknath Gangopadhyay's Bengali novel Swarnalata into Malayalam. He died on 30 January 1930.

== Writing ==
Panicker wrote both poetry and prose. When Bhashaposhini's second conference was held in Trichur, he won first place in the poetry competition. His oeuvre consists of only a limited number of stories, poems, and essays almost all of which were published in Vidya Vinodini and Rasikaranjini. Panicker, who specialised in natural science, was the chief science reporter of Vidyavinodini.

C. S. Gopala Panicker, Vengayil Kunhiraman Nayanar, Oduvil Kunhikrishna Menon, Moorkoth Kumaran, Chenkulath Cheriya Kunhirama Menon (M. R. K. C.) and Ambadi Narayana Poduval are widely regarded as pioneers of the short story in Malayalam literature. All of them were inspired by the emergence of short story as an important genre in Western literature, particularly the writings of Nathaniel Hawthorne, Edgar Allan Poe, etc. Panicker, along with E. V. Krishna Pillai and K. Sukumaran, is also said to have been a link between the old and new generations of story writers. Some of his short stories include "Melvilasom Maari", "Neelam Kuranja Kathu" and "Oru Muthalanayattu". "Swayam Prakashamulla Janthukkal", "Pakshikalude Aspathri", "Monaco" and "Japankaarum Avarude Chakravarthiyum" are some of the articles published. According to Ulloor S. Parameswara Iyer, "Oru Muthalanayattu" published in Rasikaranjini is an important short story in Malayalam literature.
