= Oduvil Kunhikrishna Menon =

19th-century Malayalam-language poet and journalist

- ഒടുവിൽ കുഞ്ഞിക്കൃഷ്ണമേനോൻ
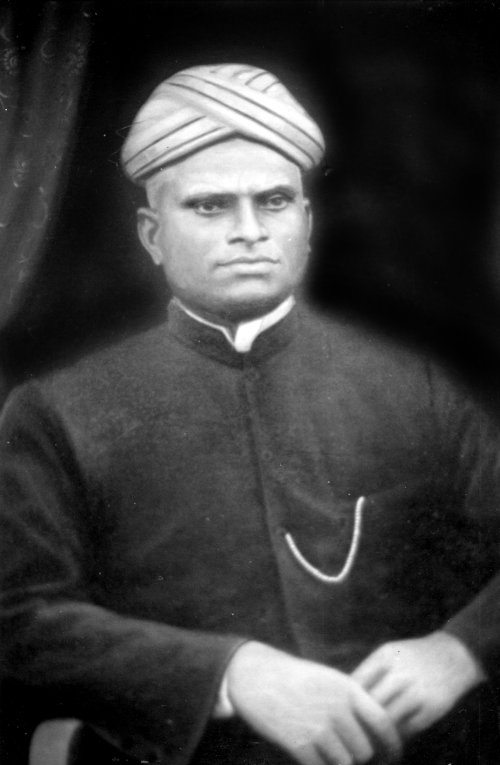
- Born: 26 October 1869; Enkakkad, Wadakkancherry, Kingdom of Cochin
- Died: 18 May 1916 (aged 46); Ernakulam, Kingdom of Cochin
- Education: Bachelor of Arts
- Occupations: Writer, poet, civil servant
- Writing career
- Language: Malayalam
- Genres: Poem, story, literary criticism
- Movement: Venmani School

Oduvil Kunhikrishna Menon (26 October 1869 – 18 May 1916) was a Malayalam–language poet, short-story writer, journalist and literary critic from Kerala, India. Menon was associated with the Venmani School of Malayalam poetry and was also a major figure in early prose literature. Along with Vengayil Kunhiraman Nayanar, Moorkoth Kumaran, Chenkulath Cheriya Kunhirama Menon (M. R. K. C.), C. S. Gopala Panicker and Ambadi Narayana Poduval, Kunhikrishna Menon is regarded as a pioneer of the short story in Malayalam literature.

== Biography ==
=== Early life and career ===
Kunhikrishna Menon was born on 26 October 1869 to Alathur Manakkal Parameswaram Namboothiripad (Kunjunni) and Oduvil Kunjikuttiyamma in Enkakkad village near Wadakkancherry in the present-day Thrissur district of Kerala state. Kunhikrishna Menon got his family name, Oduvil, through matrilineal succession.

He was educated at Wadakkancherry Grant School and Trichur Mission School. He completed his FA at Maharaja's College, Ernakulam and Madras. He then worked as the headmaster at Wadakkanchery Middle School for two years. In 1898, he completed a BA at Trivandrum University College. He has the distinction of being the first Malayalam language poet to complete a BA. His family was not financially well at this time, so he completed his studies by working and with the help of his friends. He also got the support of Kerala Varma Valiya Koil Thampuran. To support himself, he wrote articles in Malayala Manorama and edited the magazine Ramarajan which was started under the ownership of Sankarayar, a bookseller in Trivandrum.

After completing his studies, he joined the Cochin government service as a clerk in Ernakulam Huzur Cutchery. Later, he served in Chittur, Thalappilli and Trichur taluks as deputy and rose from that position to become Tehsil Magistrate in Kodungallur. Although Menon had already attained fame as a Venmani poet by this time, it was only then he became personally close with the Kodungallur Kovilakam who pioneered the Venmani School. Later Menon served as the magistrate in Irinjalakkuda, Cochin and Ernakulam taluks.

=== Personal life and death ===
He remarried following each widowhood. Ittyanath Mookambika Amma (sister to the Cochin king) was his first wife. He then married Alathu Puthan Veettil Chinnammu Amma., followed by Achatil Kochukutti Amma. He had from his marriages three daughters and one son. His younger brother Oduvil Sankarankutty Menon (1883–1945), who was born blind, was also a noted poet in Malayalam. He also had a younger sister, Ammukutty amma, who was married to the poet Pandalam Kerala Varma, Ammalu Amma, and Lakshmikutty Amma (who was the first principal of the school run by their family: later taken over by the government). Writers Alathur Anujan Namboothiripad (1882–1943) and Paliath Cheriya Kunjunni Achan (1880–1943) were his stepbrothers. Film actor Oduvil Unnikrishnan (1943–2006) was his niece’s son.

Menon died of diabetes on 18 May 1916. He was the Magistrate of Ernakulam taluk at the time of his death.

== Writing ==
Menon wrote poetry, short story, novel, farce and criticism. A gradual growth can be seen in his literature, starting from the traditional poetic style like praise poems, through the stylistic and linguistic innovation started by the Venmani movement, reaching the modern literary movements such as short stories and novels. The Sanskrit influence in his early works can be seen gradually decreasing and the English influence growing.

=== Poetry ===
Menon started writing poetry at a very early age. Even though he never had the opportunity to formally learn Sanskrit, he was able to excel as a scholar and poet. He won the prize in the 1893 Bhashaposhini sabha poetry conference held in Calicut. Menon wrote poetry in both Sanksrit metres and Malayalam metres. Vinodini, Lakshmivilasa Satakam, Antarjanathinte Aparadham, Oru Police Inspectorude Vadham, Oru Pathivrathayude Katha, Kumbakona Yatra and Madirashi Kadalkara are the major works composed in Sanskrit metres. Ajamilamoksham Vanjippattu is an important work composed in Malayalam metres. Works like Upakosa, Panchangi,Chandalimoksham and Devayani Parinayam were written in collaboration with other poets. Devayani Parinayam (Quilon: E. V. R. Unnithan, 1914) was co-authored with Ulloor S. Parameswara Iyer, Kundoor Narayana Menon and Pandalam Kerala Varma. 23 of his poems are compiled and published in the book Oduvil Kunhikrishna Menonte Krithikal: Part 1 (Kottakkal: Lakshmi Sahayam, 1926), with an introduction by P. V. Krishna Warrier and a biographical note by Puthezhath Govinda Menon. 23 other poems are compiled in Part 2 (Kottakkal: Lakshmi Sahayam, 1927), with an introduction by Ulloor S. Parameswara Iyer.

Menon did not write any long poems yet was regarded as a great poet. Most of his poems have an element of humour in them. Although he followed the tradition of his predecessors, the influence of western culture can be observed in his poems at many points. According to Ulloor, among the poets of the time, Menon is the one truly deserving to be called a "Sarasakavi" (meaning humour poet).

=== Prose ===
"Otuvil Kunju Krishna Menon's stories are not really short, and it is rather difficult to bring them within the limits of the short story proper. All of them have love themes ending in happy marriages, whatever the difficulty in between. They were mainly meant to be read to while away the time."

— A survey of Malayalam literature, K. M. George.

Short stories were published in Malayalam 1890s onwards. Vasanavikriti published in Vidyavinodini is a detective story. Following that, stories like Menokkiye Konnatharanu, Dwaraka, Pathalarajavu (all by Vengayil Kunhiraman Nayanar) and Ente Aadyathe Piece etc. also came out through the same magazine. A few more short stories emerged when Bhashaposhini started circulating as a magazine in 1897. Rasikaranjini magazine emerged around this time with the intention of publishing good stories. Menon was one of the first to write stories with a social theme. He remarkably succeeded in the narrative style and characterisation of his stories. His stories were not without some flaws. But the short story as a genre of literature had only developed so much then. The longest among his stories is "Malathi" which runs into eight chapters. The stories "Kalyanikutty", "Janu", "Narayanikutty" and "Kelunni Moopil Nair" have been compiled and published in a book titled Naalu Kathakal (Trichur: Mangalodayam, 1925). "Sarojini Bhai", "Vicharam Thetti", "Oru Rathri", "Sathyam Thelinju", "Kaumudi" and several other stories were published in various magazines of the time. The story "Janu" was included in the book 100 Varsham 100 Katha (100 Years 100 Stories), published by DC Books. Kunhikrishna Menon was regarded as the successor of Vengayil Kunhiraman Nayanar in Malayalam short story writing. He also wrote a farce called Kalyanikalyanam (Trichur: Jnanasagaram, 1923).

Menon also made a mark in the field of journalism as the editor of the magazine Ramarajan. Imitating Malayala Manorama, Menon introduced a column for poetry in Ramarajan and many major poets published their poems in it. He also published scholarly reviews of several books including Kottarathil Sankunni's Raja Kesavadasan in Ramarajan. Menon wrote a series of articles in Manorama under the name Kora Prabhu. This series was a humorous take on the state affairs of Cochin and was very popular at the time. Menon was actively involved in the debates that took place in the newspapers of that time based on Muloor S. Padmanabha Panicker's Kaviramayanam. He even adopted a pen name Hanuman just to criticise Muloor's work.
