= Potheri Kunjambu Vakil =

Indian poet

- Born: June 6, 1857, Kannur District
- Died: 1919
- Occupations: Poet, lawyer, social worker, rationalist

Potheri Kunjambu Vakil (1857–1919) was one of the earliest Malayalam poets and a rationalist, novelist, social worker and lawyer from Kannur district. He wrote about and worked for the upliftment of the downtrodden. He is best known for his novel Saraswati Vijayam.

In his writings, he propagated the idea that the upliftment of the downtrodden was possible through education and the eradication of superstitions. He is said to have been the first to give the Pulaya bride the name Panchamar.

== Early life and education ==
Potheri Kunjambu was born on June 6, 1857, at Pannenpara, Pallikunnu near Kannur. After studying at Ezhuthupalli run by his father Potheri Kunjakkan, he was educated in Sanskrit and Malayalam. He later studied at the Government English School in Kannur, he passed matriculation and dropped out of higher education due to poverty.

== Career ==
Kunjambu worked as a court clerk for a short time and later passed the legal examination and became a lawyer in Taliparamba and Kannur. He was the legal advisor of the Chirakkal royal family. The lawyer, who was traveling in a royal chariot, was also the landlord who owned several acres of land. Kunjambu Vakil was a fan of Sree Narayana Guru.

== Bibliography ==
- Saraswativijayam

== Works ==
He understood the problems of the evil community in which he was born. Kunjambu was more worried about the lives of the downtrodden brides than the Theas. He wrote sharp essays on religious reform and Sadhujana upliftment in newspapers like Kerala Pathrika, Kerala Sanchari and Bhashaposhini. He argued that a board should be formed for the administration of Hindu temples and that a certain percentage of the temple revenue should be used for the educational advancement of brides. In 1890, he established his own primary school for brides. Since the teachers did not even come forward from Theera, he assigned his own brother to teach there.

Aware of the importance of women's education, Kunjambu sent her daughter to Madras Medical College to become a doctor and a role model for the society. Paruvamma, the daughter of a lawyer, was the first woman doctor in Malabar.

Kunjambu also set up a printing press called Edward Press in Kannur. He has been the chairman of Kannur Municipality for ten years. In his writings, he propagated the idea that the upliftment of the downtrodden was possible through education and the eradication of superstitions. He is said to have been the first to give the bride the name Panchamar.

== Bibliography ==
- Saraswativijayam

== See also ==
- Muliyil Krishnan
