= K. Sukumaran (writer) =

Indian writer

K. Sukumaran (20 May 1876 – 11 March 1956) was a short story writer, humourist, poet, essayist and playwright from Malabar, India. He was one of the pioneers of the short story in Malayalam. He is sometimes referred to as Malabar K. Sukumaran to distinguish him from other writers with similar names.

== Life ==
K. Sukumaran was born on 20 May 1876 to Kambil Thattailathu Govindan and Idamalathu Neely. His uncle Diwan Bahadur E. K. Krishnan was a sub-judge in Calicut. Sukumaran stayed with his uncle and did his schooling. He studied at Norman School, Municipal School and Basel Mission School. He passed his matriculation in 1890 as a private candidate as he was underage. He completed his Intermediate from Telicherry Brennen College and Palghat Victoria College. He graduated in Zoology from Madras Presidency College in 1894. Then he started working as a civil court clerk. He passed the civil judiciary test in 1915. He retired from services in 1931 while working at the Assistant Sessions Court in Calicut. Sukumaran died on 11 March 1956. He was married to his uncle's daughter Kousalya.

== Writing ==
Sukumaran started his writing career by writing slokas (verses), inspired by the Venmani slokas. His initial poems were published in Bharathi, a magazine run by some prominent Thiyyas of Malabar such as M. R. K. C. Later he turned his attention to prose. Most of his stories are compiled in three books: Sukumara Katha Manjari, Cherukatha and Anchu Kathakal. In the series Sukumara Katha Manjari eight volumes are available. His novels/novelettes include Azhakulla Pennu, Vidhi, Aa Vallatha Nottam, Inakkavum Pinakkavum, Oru Podikkai, Papathinte Phalam, Aarante Kutti, Vidhavayude Vashi, Vivahathinte Vila and Virunnu Vanna Maman. Sukumaran's plays include Bheeshani, Misrayile Rani and Upadesiyaar. He also wrote a love poem titled Bhasavilasam and allegories. He wrote extensively on science topics and published books such as Albutha Viswasangalum Acharanangalum, Janthusastram, Pranivamsa Charitram, Parakkan Vayyathe Poya Pakshikal and Jyothisastram. He has written a series of four books on zoology—Anu Muthal Erumbu Vare (From germ to ant), Matsyam Muthal Pambu Vare (From fish to snake), Pakshikal (Birds) and Mrugam Muthal Manushyam Vare (From animal to man)—where he presents scientific topics in a humorous manner. In Pranivamsa Charitram, he describes lion, crow, rat, mosquito and frog. Chiriyo Chiri is a collection of humour writings. Sukumaragadyamanjari is a collection of essays.

Even though Sukumaran published about fifty works in various genres like short story, humour, novel, drama, poetry and science, Sukumaran's significance in Malayalam literature is as an early short story writer. In Kerala Sahitya Charitram (History of Literature in Kerala), Ulloor S. Parameswara Iyer mentions seven writers as the pioneers of the short story in Malayalam: Vengayil Kunhiraman Nayanar, Oduvil Kunhikrishna Menon, Ambadi Narayana Poduval, Chenkulath Cheriya Kunhirama Menon (M. R. K. C.), Sanjayan (M. Ramanunni Nair), E. V. Krishna Pillai and K. Sukumaran. According to literary critic K. M. Tharakan, the short story as a literary genre evolved and attained perfection with the arrival of K. Sukumaran and E. V. Krishna Pillai. According to K. M. George, even though there is monotony in many of K. Sukumaran's stories, they provide light entertainment because of the snatches of humour and they became very popular at the time because of their witty dialogues and lucid prose. Literary critic P. K. Parameswaran Nair notes that although K. Sukumaran's themes are not profound or his treatment artistic, the stories make interesting reading because of the humour with which they are generously treated and the clever talk of the characters. Nair also observes that Sukumaran's treatment of sringara often borders on the obscene. According to Sukumar Azhikode, love and romance dominated the themes of K. Sukumaran's stories. According to him, "the unrestrained use of wit and humour gave the stories of K. Sukumaran remarkable entertainment value", but "it destroyed the artistic unity of his creations".

== Bibliography ==
The following is a list of books published by K. Sukumaran. The bibliographical details of subsequent editions are used wherever the details of the first edition are not available.

=== Short story collections ===
Sukumara Katha Manjari

- — (1930). Sapikkapetta Sapathangal. Calicut: K. R. Brothers. (Sukumara Katha Manjari Part 1; Collection of five short stories)
- — (1930). Oru Podikkai Thudangi Naalu Sarasakathakal (PDF). Calicut: K. R. Brothers. (Sukumara Katha Manjari Part 2; Collection of four short stories)
- — (1948). Kadam Kondu Kittiya Muthal Thudangi Naalu Cherukathakal (PDF) (3rd ed.). Calicut: K. R. Brothers. (Sukumara Katha Manjari Part 3; Collection of four short stories)
- — (1955). Aarante Kutti Thudangi Anchu Cherukathakal (PDF) (Reprinted ed.). Calicut: K. R. Brothers. (Sukumara Katha Manjari Part 4; Collection of five short stories)
- — (n.d.). Sukumara Katha Manjari (4 Parts). Calicut: K. R. Brothers. (Collection of first four parts of Sukumara Katha Manjari; 18 short stories)
- — (1934). Choorkattil Chorakannan Muthal Naalu Kathakal. Calicut: K. R. Brothers. (Sukumara Katha Manjari Part 5; Collection of four short stories)
- — (1934). Irumban Kunju Thudangi Aaru Kathakal (PDF). Calicut: K. R. Brothers. (Sukumara Katha Manjari Part 6; Collection of six short stories)
- — (1936). Asooyamayam. Calicut: K. R. Brothers. (Sukumara Katha Manjari Part 7)

Others

- — (1929). Cherukathakal: Part 1. Calicut: K. R. Brothers. (Collection of six short stories)
- — (1929). Cherukathakal: Part 2. Calicut: K. R. Brothers. (Collection of six short stories)
- — (1937). Menavante Thanthravum Kurikku Kollatha Yukthiyum. Calicut: K. R. Brothers.
- — (1951). Aa Vallatha Nottam. Calicut: P. K. Brothers. (With an introduction by K. Gopalakurup)
- — (1960). Vidhavayude Vashi (PDF). Calicut: P. K. Brothers. (Collection of six short stories)

=== Novels ===
- — (n.d.). Azhakulla Pennu. Calicut: P. K. Brothers.
- — (1948). Jathayude Jayam (PDF). Calicut: P. K. Brothers. (Based on Siegfried Trebitsch's work translated by George Bernard Shaw)
- — (1949). Inakkavum Pinakkavum (PDF). Calicut: P. K. Brothers.
- — (1950). Vidhi: Part 1. Calicut: P. K. Brothers.
- — (1950). Vidhi: Part 2. Calicut: P. K. Brothers.
- — (1951). Vivahathinte Vila (PDF). Calicut: K. R. Brothers.
- — (1953). Kudumba Paridhi. Calicut: P. K. Brothers.
- — (1955). Ithu Chathiyo (PDF). Calicut: P. K. Brothers.
- — (1955). Virunnu Vanna Maman. Calicut: P. K. Brothers.
- — (1959). Chunayulla Pennu. Calicut: P. K. Brothers.
- — (1962). Papathinte Phalam athava Ragathinte Balam. Calicut: K. R. Brothers.

=== Plays ===
- — (1949). Misrayile Rani athava Ellam Kalanja Kamam. Calicut: P. K. Brothers.
- — (1951). Bheeshani. Calicut: P. K. Brothers.
- — (1961). Upadeshiyar (PDF). Calicut: P. K. Brothers.

=== Science ===
- — (1923). Janthusastram: Part 1. Calicut: K. R. Brothers. (From germs to ants)
- — (1923). Janthusastram: Part 2. Calicut: K. R. Brothers. (From fishes to snakes)
- — (1923). Janthusastram: Part 3. Calicut: K. R. Brothers. (Birds)
- — (1923). Janthusastram: Part 4. Calicut: K. R. Brothers. (Mammals)
- — (1923). Janthusastram. Calicut: K. R. Brothers. (All four volumes combined)
- — (1923). Janthu Vritantham. Quilon: V. V. Press.
- — (1929). Jyothisastram. Calicut: K. R. Brothers. (On sky, earth and stars)
- — (1931). Pranivamsa Charitram: Part 1. Calicut: K. R. Brothers. (Cellular organism, earthworm, ant, etc.)
- — (1931). Pranivamsa Charitram: Part 2. Calicut: K. R. Brothers. (Crow, dog, chicken, eagle, termite)
- — (1931). Pranivamsa Charitram: Part 3. Calicut: K. R. Brothers. (Snake, jungle crow, rat, mosquito, fox)
- — (1931). Pranivamsa Charitram: Part 4. Calicut: K. R. Brothers. (Lizard family, termite, owl, squirrel)
- — (1955). Pranivamsa Charitram (2nd ed.). Calicut: K. R. Brothers. (All four volumes combined)
- — (1957). Parakkan Vayyathayi Poya Pakshikal. Calicut: P. K. Brothers. (Chicken, Dodo, Penguin, Ostrich, Emu and Kiwi)

=== Others ===
- — (1933). Chila Anyapadeshangal. Calicut: K. R. Brothers. (Collection of allegories)
- — (1934). Sukumara Gadya Manjari. Calicut: K. R. Brothers. (Collection of 7 essays: :Poovu", "Vairakallu", "Kotti", "Mulamkoodu", "Pallikal", "Arabi Ottakam", "Oru Nirupanam")
- — (1947). Bhasavilasam. Calicut: P. K. Brothers. (Love poem)
- — (1952). Chiriyo Chiri (2nd ed.). Calicut: K. R. Brothers. (Humour)
- — (1956). Albutha Viswasangalum Acharanangalum. Calicut: P. K. Brothers. (Book on sexual beliefs and practices across the globe)
