= K. Sukumaran =

K. Sukumaran may refer to:

- K. Sukumaran (writer), short story writer (1876–1956)
- K. Sukumaran (journalist), former editor of Kerala Kaumudi (1903–1981)
- K. Sukumaran (judge), former judge at the Kerala High Court (b. 1930)
