= Kallingal Madathil Rarichan Moopan =

Prominent social reformer in Kozhikode

Kallingal Madathil Rarichan Mooppan
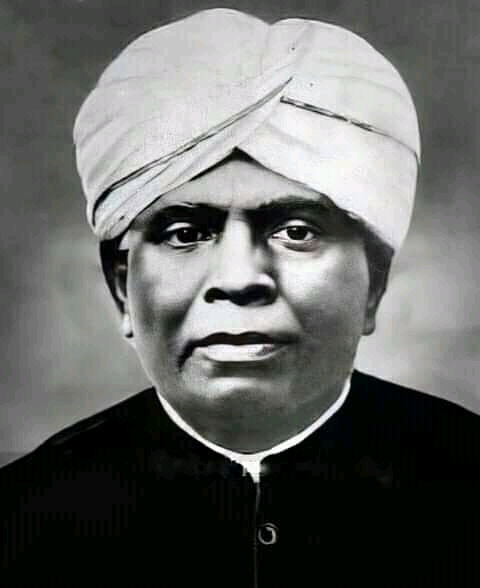
- Kallingal Madathil Rarichan Mooppan

Personal life
- Born: 1856 Kozhikode
- Died: 1913 (aged 56–57) Kozhikode
- Notable work: Thiyofication founded

Religious life
- Religion: Hinduism
- Philosophy: Social Reformer

Kallingal Madathil Rarichan Moopan (1856–1919) was a Jenmi in Kozhikode. He was a social reformer of Malabar. He is known for community development and other social services. He is one of the rare families who have done sea shipping in Kerala itself. The Karanavans of this family were traditionally known as 'Muppan'. This was the title given by Samuthiri. The Samuthiri dynasty and the Kallingal Math were gathered in the great Mamata. Kovilakam was a level of ministers and the elder Mark was given from Kovilakam. It was customary to ask them about anything. According to archive records, in 1851.

== Early life ==
Rarichan Mooppan was the scion of a Thiyya landlord family. He was born in Kozhikode on 20 February 1856. He completed his matriculation. He married the sister of Mithavaadi Krishnan, and worked as a mixed-race social reformer and community benefactor. He worked to build a temple for the backward classes and gave land to the project. The elders of that time were the wealthiest of the Kallingal Madam after the Kozhikode Zamorin. Pullambil Moopan's family of Thalassery and the families Kallingal Moopan engaged in sea trade. Rarichan Moopan worked for the construction of Sri Kandeshwara Temple in Kozhikode under the leadership of Rarichan Moopan and Moorkoth Kumaran. The temple was donated by the Kallingal family.

== Social Work ==
A large landowner and merchant, he held a high position in public life in Kozhikode. He played a major role in building the Srikanteswaram temple in Kozhikode. He generously donated the temple land and one thousand and one rupees for the construction work. he remained the president of Sri Katneshwara Temple until his death. At first he was very much impressed by Ayyathan Gopalan's Brahmo Samaj works and worked with Gopalan and Brahmosamaj. He had also been a member of Brahmosamaj and engaged in its social reform activities. He was the one who gave land for the construction of Brahmo mandir at Jail road Calicut .He played a major role with Dr. Gopalan in social reform initiatives such as Harijan revival, intermarriage, pantibhojan.etc.

Kozhikode Theosophical Lodge was dedicated by Rarichan Moopan in 1903 where it is seen today. In 1094 Kanni, the entire Kerala Thiyya Mahasammellan gathered at Paran Square, Kozhikode participated. 101k for co-operation Donated and supported community astronomy. It was the elder who took the initiative to intermarry with the Weavers, a community from the south, and have pantibhojana in Kozhikode(1911).

== Business ==
They had extensive knowledge of shipbuilding and navigation. In the Malabar region, several families, each headed by a Mooppan (patriarch), were highly respected by the mercantile community in Kerala and abroad, for their entrepreneurship and trade. Prominent members of the circle include Vamala Mooppan, Kelu Mooppan, Pullampil Mooppan, Vayayil Mooppan and Kallingkal Mooppan. One family was Rarichan Mooppan who owned and possessed property in Kozhikode. He continued in the sea trade until the first quarter of the 20th century.

Kallingkal Madam was one of the leading shipowners and traders whose ships used a separate dock in Arabia. The ships exported goods from Kerala up to Konkan, such as timber, spices, copra, elephant tusks, cured fish, rice, millet, peacock-feather and animal skins, woven cloth and handicrafts. They imported dates to and myrrh.

The Kallingkal Madam also contributed C. Krishnan, editor of the revolutionary journal Mithavadi (Moderate).

== Kallingal Family and Victoria Press ==
Below is a note dated 1922 relating to the Kallingal Math and the Victoria Press, Kozhikode.

The place where the Empress Victoria Press stood was the place where the ancient Kallingal Math was born as a lineage and its member, Rarichan Moopan Ittikoshi, was entrusted with the vision and Kesavamenon was written all the way from Ittikoshi in black and later Rarichanmoupan Kesavamenon himself deconstructed it. SSV from a tenant of Kallingal family. It also included a place previously occupied by a man named Vithalrao. After the first Kanari gave up all his rights to Kesavamenon, Vitthalrao confronted Kesavamenon and at that time was holding Karaimasthalam under him on a nine-part lease in Kollam.
