= 1904 in poetry =

This article covers 1904 in poetry. Nationality words link to articles with information on the nation's poetry or literature (for instance, Irish or France).

== Events ==
- Nobel Prize in Literature is shared by French poet Frédéric Mistral and Spanish dramatist José Echegaray y Eizaguirre.
- The National Monthly in Canada publishes an article by Arthur John Arbuthnott Stringer on Charles G. D. Roberts titled "The Father of Canadian Poetry", a title which sticks to Roberts, an influential poet, long afterward.

== Works published in English ==
=== United Kingdom ===
- John Davidson, The Testament of a Prime Minister
- Ford Madox Ford, The Face of the Night
- Thomas Hardy, The Dynasts: A drama of the Napoleonic Wars, Part I, followed by Part II (1906) and Part III (1908)
- Henry Newbolt, Songs of the Sea
- Alfred Noyes, Poems
- Edwin Arnold, Indian Poetry
- AE (George William Russell), The Divine Vision, and Other Poems
- Christina Rossetti, Poetical Works, edited by W. M. Rossetti
- Algernon Charles Swinburne, A Channel Passage, and Other Poems
- William Watson, For England

=== United States ===
- Florence Earle Coates (1850–1927), Mine and Thine
- Joel Chandler Harris, The Tar Baby and Other Rhymes of Uncle Remus
- Josephine Preston Peabody, Pan, A Choric Idyl
- Carl Sandburg, In Reckless Ecstasy
- John B. Tabb, The Rosary in Rhyme

=== Other in English ===
- Isabel Ecclestone Mackay, Between the Light, Canada
- Nagesh Vishwanath Pai (also spelled "Nagesh Vishwvanath Pai"), Angel of Misfortune, India, Indian poetry in English
- Agnes Ethelwyn Wetherald, The Radiant Road, Canada

== Works published in other languages ==
- Alexander Blok, Stikhi o prekrasnoi Dame ("Verses to the Beautiful Lady"), Russia, an early work of the Silver Age of Russian Poetry
- Constantine P. Cavafy, Waiting for the Barbarians, Greece
- William Chapman, Les aspirations: poésies canadiennes, Canadian poet published in France
- José Santos Chocano, Los cantos del Pacífico ("The Songs of the Pacific"), Peru
- Sophus Claussen, Djavlerier ("Diableries"), Denmark
- Zinaida Gippius, «Собрание стихов. 1889–1903» ("Collected Poems, 1889–1903"), Russia
- Pamphile Lemay, Les gouttelettes, sonnet sequence, French language, Canada
- Saint-John Perse, pen name of Marie-René Alexis Saint-Léger, Images à Crusoé, published when the author is 17 years old, France
- Charles Van Lerberghe, La Chanson d'Ève, France
- Swami Vivekananda, Nachuk Tahate Shyama, India, Bengali

== Births ==
Death years link to the corresponding "[year] in poetry" article:

- January 21 – Richard P. Blackmur (died 1965), American poet and critic
- January 23 – Louis Zukofsky (died 1978), American poet and co-founder and primary theorist of the Objectivist group of poets
- February 2 – A. R. D. Fairburn (died 1957), New Zealander
- February 9 – Kikuko Kawakami 川上 喜久子 (died 1985), Japanese Shōwa period novelist, short-story writer and poet, a woman
- March 1 – Margaret Steuart Pollard, née Gladstone (died 1996), English oriental scholar, bard of the Cornish Gorsedd, philanthropist and eccentric
- April 5 – Richard Eberhart (died 2005), American poet and winner of the Pulitzer Prize for Poetry in 1966 and a National Book Award in 1977
- April 27 – Cecil Day-Lewis (died 1972), Anglo-Irish poet, British Poet Laureate from 1967 to 1972, and mystery writer
- May 13 – Earle Birney (died 1995), Canadian poet and two-time winner of the Governor General's Award for Literature (in 1942 and 1945)
- May 20 – Nagai Tatsuo 永井龍男, used the pen-name of "Tomonkyo" for his poetry (died 1990), Japanese Shōwa period novelist, short-story writer, haiku poet, editor and journalist
- May 26 – Necip Fazıl Kısakürek (died 1983), Turkish
- June 8 – Alice Rahon (died 1987), French-born Mexican surrealist poet and painter
- June 13 – John K. Ewers (died 1978), Australian
- July 5 – Harold Acton (died 1994), Anglo-Italian writer, scholar and dilettante
- July 12 – Pablo Neruda (died 1973), Chilean writer and Communist politician
- August 15 – Subedar Mahmoodmiya Mohammad Imam, popularly known as "Asim Randeri" (died 2009), Indian, Gujarati-language ghazal poet
- October 18 – Hayyim Schirmann (died 1981), Russian-born Israeli professor of medieval Spanish Jewish poetry
- October 21 – Patrick Kavanagh (died 1967), Irish poet and novelist
- October 29 – Audrey Alexandra Brown (died 1998), Canadian
- December 21 – Johannes Edfelt (died 1997), Swedish poet
- December 28 – Hori Tatsuo 堀 辰雄 (died 1953), Japanese Shōwa period writer, poet and translator
- December 31 – Fumiko Hayashi 林 芙美子 (born this year or 1903 (sources disagree) – 1951), Japanese novelist, writer and poet (a woman)
- Also:
  - J. A. R. McKellar (died 1932), Australian
  - Premendra Mitra (died 1988), Bengali poet, novelist, short-story writer, including thrillers and science fiction
  - Alexander Vvedensky (died 1941), Russian avant-garde poet

== Deaths ==
- January 3 – Larin Paraske, 70 (born 1833), Finnish Izhorian oral poet and rune-singer
- January 8 – John Farrell (born 1851), Australian
- March 24 – Sir Edwin Arnold, 71, English poet and journalist
- July 6 – Abai Qunanbaiuly, 58 (born 1845), Kazakh poet, composer, philosopher and cultural reformer
- October 4 – Adela Florence Nicolson, 39, English poet writing under the pseudonym "Laurence Hope", of suicide
- October 11 – Trumbull Stickney, 40, American classical scholar and poet, from a brain tumor
- October 17 – Ștefan Petică, 27 (born 1877), Romanian Symbolist poet and writer, of tuberculosis

== See also ==
- 20th century in poetry
- 20th century in literature
- List of years in poetry
- List of years in literature
- French literature of the 20th century
- Silver Age of Russian Poetry
- Young Poland (Młoda Polska) a modernist period in Polish arts and literature, roughly from 1890 to 1918
- Poetry
