= Moorkoth Kumaran =

Indian social reformer and writer (1874–1941)

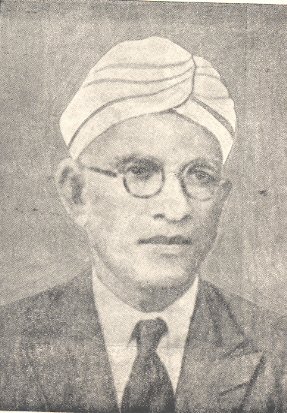
- Moorkoth Kumaran
- Born: 23 May 1874; Telicherry, Malabar District, British India
- Died: 25 June 1941 (aged 67); Telicherry
- Occupations: Writer, social reformer, teacher
- Years active: 1896–1940

Moorkoth Kumaran (1874–1941) was a social reformer, a teacher and a writer in Malayalam. He hailed from Telicherry. He was a disciple of Narayana Guru and wrote the first biography of Guru. He also published some of the earliest short stories and novels in Malayalam.

== Biography ==
Moorkoth Kumaran was born on 23 May 1874 into the Moorkoth family of North Malabar. His father was Moorkoth Ramunni (Sr.), and his mother was Parappurathu Kunchirutha. His mother died when he was aged six and his father when he was eight. Kumaran grew up under the care of his father's sister. Kumaran started his education by joining Basel Mission Parsi High School, Telicherry, in 1884 and passed FA degree from Telicherry Brennen College. He joined Madras Christian College for a BA degree but could not complete the degree. He married his relative Yashoda and was sent by his father-in-law for training at Teachers' College, Saidapet. After completing his training, Kumaran became a teacher at St. Joseph's European Boy's High School in Calicut in 1897. He was the headmaster there from 1898 to 1900. He then became a teacher at St. Joseph's Convent, and it was during this time that Indian women in Malabar started education in English schools. Grace Chandran, who was the first Indian woman in Malabar to pass Matriculation, was his student. Moorkoth Kumaran was the editor of Mithavadi which was initially started as a newspaper (magazine) in 1907 at Thalassery. It was regarded as the "Bible of the socially oppressed". It featured articles and writings regarding the socially depressed classes and was a voice for the rights of the depressed classes. He met the great renaissance leader and social reformer of Kerala Rao Sahib DR. Ayyathan Gopalan while working as a teacher at St. Joseph's school and worked together for the rights of the Dalits of Malabar. In 1913 Mithavadi newspaper was taken over by C. Krishnan by the impetus and advice from Ayyathan Gopalan. Dr. Gopalan gave him encouragement and helped him to take over this newspaper. Later C. Krishnan came to be known as Mithavaadi Krishnan. From 1913 to 1921 it started its publication from Calicut through empire press as Monthly and then as a weekly until 1938. Moorkoth Kumaran worked as the senior Malayalam pandit at St. Aloysius College (1907–1912), headmaster at Nettur Basel Mission Middle School (1913–1924) and first assistant at Telicherry St Joseph's School (1924–1930) from where he retired in 1930.

Kumaran was instrumental in spreading the ideas of Sri Narayana Guru in Malabar. It was Kumaran who initiated placing the statue of Guru at Jagannath Temple in Telicherry in 1927. It was the first statue of Narayana Guru in Kerala when he was alive. Kumaran was also instrumental in the efforts to admit the Pulayas and other lower castes into the Jagannath Temple. He was the second general secretary of SNDP Yogam.

Kumaran was active in social and literary circles post-retirement. He wrote his last story titled "Aliyante Saree" in Brennen College magazine. He died on 25 June 1941. Moorkoth Kunhappa, who was a bureaucrat and prominent journalist, Moorkoth Ramunni, who was a fighter pilot, and Moorkoth Sreenivasan, who was a teacher in Pondicherry, are his sons. His daughter's name is KunzhiLakshmi.

== Writing ==
Moorkoth Kumaran, Vengayil Kunhiraman Nayanar, Oduvil Kunhikrishna Menon, C. S. Gopala Panicker, Ambadi Narayana Poduval and Chenkulath Cheriya Kunhirama Menon (M. R. K. C.) are regarded as the pioneers of the short story in Malayalam literature. In 1891, Kumaran wrote his first story Kalikala Vaibhavam when he was still a student. The story was returned by two editors until finally accepted by Kandathil Varghese Mappillai who published it in Malayala Manorama on 22 February 1896. Then the next story called Anyatha Chinthitham Karyam Daivamanyathra Chinthayel was published in Bhashaposhini, also by Varghese Mappillai. Vengayil Kunhiraman Nayanar's "Vasanavikriti" is recognised as the first short story in Malayalam, but Kumaran's "Kalikala Vaibhavam" is sometimes acknowledged as the first well-shaped short story in Malayalam. The initial eleven years from 1891 saw eleven short stories published in Malayalam, authored by Vengayil Kunhiraman Nayanar, Moorkoth Kumaran, C. S. Gopala Panicker and Oduvil Kunhikrishna Menon. Among the eleven stories, four were by Kumaran. Writer Moorkoth Kunhappa has noted that Kumaran's short stories follow the principle of 'singleness of effect' which was lacking in most of the early short stories in Malayalam.

Kumaran was also one of the early novelists who wrote seven novels namely Lokapavadam, Kanakam Moolam, Jahaneera, Rajaputhra Viwaham, Ambu Nair, Vasumathi and Vellikkai. He also penned the prose collections Kakan, Gadyaprabandham, Gadyamanjari and Asan Vimarsanathinte Aadya Rasmikal. After writing Kakan (Crow), which was based on an article by ornithologist Douglas Dewar, Kumaran wrote extensively on science. He wrote articles on insects, flies, mosquitoes, beetles, ants, termites, cockroaches and wild lice. He also translated the book Wonders of Physical Science by Edmund Edward Fournier d'Albe into Malayalam under the title Prakriti Shastrathile Albuthangal.

After Kumaran prepared the biography of Sri Narayana Guru in two volumes (1930), he also wrote an interpretation of Guru's Darsanamala. He wrote the story "Vasumathi" which depicts the culture and history of the Thiyya community in Malabar. Kumaran also wrote the biographies of O. Chandu Menon and Vengayil Kunhiraman Nayanar and has also written biographical essays on Kandathil Varghese Mappillai, Kerala Varma Valiya Koil Thampuran, A. R. Raja Raja Varma and Kumaran Asan.

Moorkoth Kumaran edited several literary journals in Malayalam. He entered the newspaper industry as the editor of Kerala Sanchari. Kumaran Asan's Veena Poovu was first published in Mithavadi when Kumaran was the editor. Subsequently, Kumaran, edited Kerala Chintamani, Samudaya Deepika, Gajakesari, Satyavadi, Atmaposhini, Dharmam, Kathorakuthaaram and Deepika. He wrote many articles in prominent newspapers of the time under the pen names of Gajakesari, Patanjali, Vajrasuchi and Pouran.

== Bibliography ==
The following list includes most of the published works of Moorkoth Kumaran:

=== Novels ===
Year	Title	Publisher	Notes
1903	Lokapavadam	Calicut: Malabar Spectator	
1905	Kanakam Moolam	Calicut: Spectator Press	Detective fiction; New edition Calicut: PK Brothers, 1966
1912	Vasumathi	Telicherry: Vidya Vilasam	
1916	Ambu Nair	Cannanore: Edward Press	
1967	Ambu Nairum Lokapavadavum	Calicut: PK Brothers	Collection of two novels: Ambu Nair and Lokapavadam
—	Rajaputhra Vivaham	—	

=== Short story collections ===
Year	Title	Publisher	Notes
1929	Ente Chila Anubhavangal	Calicut: K. R. Brothers	Collection of 6 stories
1967	Moorkothinte Cherukathakal	Quilon: M. S. Book Depot	Collection of 15 stories
1987	Moorkoth Kumarante Kathakal	Calicut: Mathrubhumi	Complete collection of short stories and the novels Lokapavadam, Kanakam Moolam and Ambu Nair; With a foreword by Sukumar Azhikode

=== Short stories ===
Year	Title	Publisher
1896	"Kalikala Vaibhavam"	Malayala Manorama, 22 February 1896
1896	"Anyatha Chinthitham Karyam Daivamanyathra Chinthayel"	Bhashaposhini, 1072 Kanni-Thulam
1897	"Ente Kozhikode Yathra"	Bhashaposhini, 1072 Mithunam
1897	"Ente Theevandi Yathra"	Bhashaposhini, 1073 Chingam
1902	"Kazmiyude Cheruppu"	Bhashaposhini, 1077 Mithunam
1905	"Abharana Bhramam"	Rasikaranjini, 1080 Edavam
1905	"Oru Maranapathram"	Rasikaranjini, 1081 Kanni
1909	"Ennittum"	Vivekodayam, 1085 Chingam
1909	"Orotta Nokku"	Vivekodayam, 1085 Vrishchikam
1910	"Oru Cheriya Kutty"	Vivekodayam, 1085 Karkkidakam
1912	"Rathi Bhai"	Bhashaposhini, 1087 Dhanu-Makaram
1912	"Parukutty"	Vivekodayam, 1088 Thulam
1913	"Avanum Bharyayum Athava Kalavum Samshayavum"	Mangalodayam, 1089 Dhanu
1914	"Oru Theevandi Apakadam"	Mithavadi, 1089 Makaram
1914	"Oru Vanakusumam"	Bhashaposhini, 1090 Chingam-Kanni
1915	"Doctor Rakshapettathu"	Mithavadi, 1091 Chingam
1915	"Kolayo Athmagathiyo?"	Samudaya Deepika, 1091 Vrishchikam
1916	"Oru Kathinakkai"	Bhashaposhini, 1092 Chingam-Kanni
1917	"Krishna Kumari"	Mithavadi, 1093 Chingam
1919	"Oru Nariye Konna Vedi"	Bhashaposhini, 1094 Makaram
1929	"Aviralayam"	Mathrubhumi, 1104 Medam
1929	"Avalude Makal"	Deepam, 1105 Kanni
1929	"Oru Purusha Samajam"	Deepam, 1105 Kanni
1929	"Tharavattile Kutty"	Deepam, 1105 Thulam
1929	"Ishtarach – Adiyaravu"	Deepam, 1105 Vrishchikam
1929	"Oru Perumkallan"	Ente Chila Anubhavangal
1929	"Daiva Siksha"	Ente Chila Anubhavangal
1929	"Swadeshikal"	Ente Chila Anubhavangal
1929	"Oru Madhyastha"	Ente Chila Anubhavangal
1929	"Vairamothiram"	Ente Chila Anubhavangal
1929	"Pisachu"	Ente Chila Anubhavangal
1930	"Jyeshtathi Ammayude Abharanangal"	Deepam, 1105 Makaram
1930	"Palliyile Mani"	Deepam, 1105 Meenam
1930	"Misravivaham"	Deepam, 1105 Medam
1930	"Oru Bhakthan"	Deepam, 1106 Chingam
1930	"Ithinenthu Hethu"	Deepam, 1106 Kanni
1930	"Randum Sthreekal"	Deepam, 1106 Vrischikam
1931	"Kuttappan"	Deepam, 1106 Makaram
1931	"Vithachathalla Koythath"	Deepam, 1106 Medam
1931	"Parishkaram Prapicha Pathni"	Deepam, 1106 Idavam
1935	"Changathiyude Parinamam"	Mithavadi, 1935 special edition
1935	"Kathinam"	Kairali, 1110 Medam
1936	"Ammamante Makal"	Mathrubhumi, 1936 special edition
1939	"Aliyante Saree"	Brennen College magazine
1987	"Draivini"	Moorkoth Kumarante Kathakal
—	"Ammayum Makanum"	Vidyalayam, Vol. 1 Issue 1
—	"Marippoya Tholppetti"	Mangalodayam
—	"Thalayana Manthram"	Sanjayan, Vol. 11 Issue 3
—	"Vakkeelinte Samarthyam"	Sanjayan

=== Children's literature ===
Year	Title	Publisher	Notes
1910	Shakuntalam	Telicherry: Victor Press	Based on Tales from Kalidasa
1916	Sairandhri	Trivandrum: V. V.	
1931	Kunchan Kathakal	Trivandrum: V. V.	Collection of 4 stories
1932	Bharatha Katha Samgraham	Trivandrum: V. V.	

=== Criticism / Biography ===
Year	Title	Publisher	Notes
1930	Sri Narayana Guruswamikalude Jivacharithram	Telicherry: M. G. & Sons	Biography of Sri Narayana Guru in two volumes
1932	Rao Bahadur O. Chandu Menon	Trivandrum: V. V.	Biography of O. Chandu Menon
1933	Vengayil Kunhiraman Nayanar (Kesari)	Trivandrum: V. V.	Book on Vengayil Kunhiraman Nayanar
1966	Asan Vimarsanathinte Aadya Rasmikal	Calicut: PK Brothers	16 essays on the poetry of Kumaran Asan, compiled by Komalezhath Madhavan
1967	Gadyamanjari	Kottayam: Vidyarthi Mithram	Compilation of essays: Kavitha, Bhavanasakthi, Kalidasante Upamakal, Bhashakavikal, Kunchanum Thullalum, Kerala Varma, Saraswathi Vijayam, Kavyopaharam, Sacharitra Sathakam, A. R. Raja Raja Varma
1967	Gadyamanjari: Part 2	Calicut: PK Brothers	Compilation of essays: Gadyavum Padyavum, Gadyaprabandham, Novel, Chandu Menonte Vachakareethi, Malayala Bhashaykk Anyabhashakal Kondundayittulla Prayojanangal; and reviews of Kundalatha, Indulekha and Sarada
1968	Asan Vimarsanathinte Aadya Rasmikal (Part 2)	Kottayam: Vidyarthi Mithram	Essays on the poetry of Kumaran Asan, compiled by Komalezhath Madhavan; With a foreword by Sukumar Azhikode; Includes a study on Moorkoth Kumaran by Komalezhath Madhavan, and essays on Asan by K. Bhanumati Amma and Kunnath Janardhana Menon

=== Translations ===
Year	Title	Publisher	Notes
1920	Jahaneera	Telicherry: M. G. & Sons	Translated from English
1927	Ashakula	Calicut: Mangalodayam Press	Translation of Isabella, or the Pot of Basil by John Keats; Republished by PK Brothers (Calicut, 1967)
1952	Bhrahmavidya Prarambha Paatham	Alleppey: Kerala Theosophical Federation	Translation of Catherine W. Christie's Theosophy for Beginners; Authors: Moorkoth Kumaran, Poomarathil Vasudevan and N. Kesava Panikkar; Moorkoth Kumaran's translation originally published in Sanatana Dharmam magazine (1913)
1971	Vellikkai	Kottayam: Vidyarthi Mithram	Translation of a work by Eliza Fanny Pollard; Originally published in Deepam magazine (year unknown)

=== Others ===
Year	Title	Publisher	Notes
1918	Kaakan	Telicherry: Vidya Vilasam	Based on an article by Douglas Dewar
1920	Oru Maha Sathyam Adhava Kooniyude Kusruthi	Cannanore: Caxton Press	Play based on a story from Ramayana
1923	Yadavakrishnan	Telicherry: Vidya Vilasam	Non-fiction, on Lord Krishna
1924	Oru Vaidyante Anubhavangal	Telicherry: Vidya Vilasam	
1934	Samudayadeepam	Puthukkad: Kerala Bhanu Book Depot	1934 Speech at Thiyya Mahajana Sabha, Cochin
1941	Ambalapattu	Telicherry: Moorkoth Sreenivasan (Vidya Vilasam)	Poetry
1962	Ilanjipoomala	Telicherry: Moorkoth Sreenivasan	Collection of two poems: Ilanjipoomala, Oru Chitram
1966	Koodalmanikyam: Charithranweshanam	Irinjalakuda: St. George Press	History of Koodalmanikyam Temple
1971	Chihnam	Kottayam: Vidyarthi Mithram	Language and Grammar
1985	Ammamaarodu	Telicherry: Vijaya Vilasam	Speech
