= Sukumar (disambiguation) =

Sukumar (born 1970) is an Indian film director in Telugu cinema.

Sukumar may also refer to:

- Sukumar (writer), Indian humourist and cartoonist in Malayalam literature
- Sukumar (1950 film), a film by P. Pullaiah
- Sukumar (2011 film), a film starring Suhani Kalita

== People with the given name ==
- Sukumar Azhikode (1926–2012), Indian writer and orator in the Malayalam-language
- Sukumar Barua (1938–2026), Bangladeshi poet
- Sukumar Ranjan Ghosh (1952–2025), Bangladeshi politician
- Sukumar Ray (1887–1923), Bengali poet, writer, and editor

== See also ==
- Sukumaran (1945–1998), Indian film actor in Malayalam cinema
- Sukumaran (surname), Indian surname
