= Ambadi Narayana Poduval =

Indian writer (1871–1936)

Ambadi Narayana Poduval (1871–1936) was a Malayalam-language short story writer from Kerala, India. Along with Vengayil Kunhiraman Nayanar, Oduvil Kunhikrishna Menon, Moorkoth Kumaran, Chenkulath Cheriya Kunhirama Menon (M. R. K. C.) and C. S. Gopala Panicker, Poduval is regarded as a pioneer of the short story in Malayalam literature.

== Life ==
Poduval was born in 1871 in Trichur. His father Seshayar was a lawyer. Parvathi Poduvalsyar was his mother. Kunhikrishna Poduval, a poet at that time, was his relative. He joined Trichur Hindu High School and passed the matriculation exam. Later, he entered the government service while still an intermediate student in Cochin. After a long period of government service, he retired while serving as Sub-Registrar in 1926. He died on 15 July 1936 at Peringavu near Trichur.

== Writing ==
Poduval started his literary life as a poet. His first poem Kavimrigavali was published in Vidyavinodini. Poduval soon started writing stories, which was still budding as a genre in Malayalam literature. In an essay written in 1935, Poduval stated that he desired to become a good short story writer long back and he is still eager to achieve that dream. Poduval collected his short stories and published them in three volumes under the name Kathasaudham. Apart from that, his books include a play called Mochanam and a novel called Keralaputran. The novel Keralaputran is set during the reign of the Perumals and tells the story of the Chera prince Imayakumaran and Chola princess Pulomaja, the daughter of Karikala. The play Mochanam is set in the backdrops of the 18th century Zamorin rule in Trichur and its narrative style is inspired by Walter Scott's The Bride of Lammermoor.

Poduval is regarded as one of the pioneers of the short story in Malayalam literature. Literary critic K. M. George writes in his book A survey of Malayalam literature: "Ampadi Narayana Poduval was a conscious artist, who took special care to write in chiselled and resonant prose. His stories are pleasant reading, but they do not make a deep impression on the readers, and they lack unity of design, so important in a short story." P. K. Parameswaran Nair writes in his book History of Malayalam Literature: "The stories of Ambady Narayana Poduval give the impression that their author was devoted more to beautifying the language than to the course of the events or the realism of the characters." Nair also observes that of all the early short stories in Malayalam, those of Poduval make a pleasant reading even today.

== Bibliography ==
- Kathasaudham: Part 1. Trivandrum: Bharata Vilasam. 1923. (Collection of 13 short stories; With an introduction by Appan Thampuran)
- Kathasaudham: Part 2. Trivandrum: Bharata Vilasam. 1923. (Collection of 9 short stories)
- Kerala Putran (3 ed.). 1924. (Novel; With an introduction by Ulloor S. Parameswara Iyer)
- Kshatra Prabhavam. Trichur: Ramanuja. 1927. (Translation of the work Prathapa Simhan)
- Kathasaudham: Part 3 (2 ed.). Trichur: Ramanuja. 1934. (Collection of 10 short stories)
- Mochanam Athava Chiruthakundile Pothottam. Trichur: Ramanuja. 1935. (Play)
