= Chengalath Cheriya Kunhirama Menon =

Indian author and journalist (1882–1939)

Chengalath Cheriya Kunhirama Menon (1882–1939), also known by his nom de plume M. R. K. C., was a Malayalam–language author and journalist from Kerala, India. He was associated with prominent newspapers and periodicals such as Kerala Pathrika and Mangalodayam. Some of his famous books include Velluva Kammaran Allenkil Sardar Sheikh Ayaz Khan and M. R. K. C. yude Cherukathakal. M. R. K. C. along with Moorkoth Kumaran, Vengayil Kunhiraman Nayanar, Oduvil Kunhikrishna Menon, C. S. Gopala Panicker and Ambadi Narayana Poduval are regarded as the pioneers of the short story in Malayalam literature.

== Early life ==
Chengalath Kunhirama Menon was born in 1882 in Valapattanam near Cannanore in Malabar. His mother was Chengalath Narayani Amma. Kunhirama got his family name, Chengalath, through matrilineal succession. His maternal uncle, is Chengalath Kunhirama Menon who founded one of the earliest Malayalam newspapers Kerala Pathrika in 1885. He was called Cheriya Kunhirama Menon to distinguish him from his uncle who was referred to as Valiya Kunhirama Menon, the equivalent of junior and senior generational titles in Malayalam. Menon assumed the nom de plume M. R. K. C., a combination of all four initials of his name written in English (Cheriya-Kunhi-Rama-Menon, C. K. R. M.) and reversed.

Menon received his primary education from the Ezhuthupalli run by Kunhikannan Gurukkal at Puzhathi near his home. After passing 4th class, he studied Sanskrit for two years. At the age of 12, he started studying English at Cannanore Municipal School. In 1899 he passed the Upper Secondary Examination from Madras and joined as a clerk in Malabar Birth Registration Office in 1900. Then he worked in Revenue Department in Calicut for four years. During this time he learned shorthand, typewriting, bookkeeping, commercial correspondence, and land surveying. By that time he had also acquired the necessary skills to write articles in English and Malayalam.

== Career ==
In 1904, he became a head clerk for the land reforms work of the local ruler of Punnathur. During this time, he published English articles in West Coast Spectator, a newspaper based in Calicut. He also wrote essays on various topics in Malayalam newspapers. He adopted the pen name M. R. K. C.

It was a time when the Kerala Pathrika newspaper, which was run by his uncle, was in financial trouble. Menon took leave from government service and took charge of Kerala Pathrika. Later he resigned from government services and shifted to Trichur, accepting the position of manager of Mangalodayam Company which run the Mangalodayam magazine. He married Rayirath Ammukkuttiyamma in 1913 when he was based in Trichur. He was associated with Mangalodayam from 1912 to 1930. During this time, Menon was injured in an accident when a part of the Mangalodayam building which was under construction collapsed. One leg had to be amputated.

He founded a literary association named Samastha Kerala Pusthakalaya Samithi in Trichur and was also instrumental in setting up the All Kerala Library Association also based in Trichur. He started a monthly magazine Bharathi in 1933 in Trichur. This was converted into a weekly called Kudumbapatrika in 1934. However, it stopped due to financial difficulties. He also served as an editor in the Trichur-based Keralan newspaper. He resigned from Keralan due to poor health but took up the editorship of the magazine Sahakaranaprabodhini, published by Cochin Central Cooperative Society, for some time. After a while, he resigned from there too owing to poor health. However, he wanted to continue writing and even the day before he died, he wrote an article for Sahakaranaprabodhini. He died on 20 August 1939.

== Writing ==
Menon was a major writer during the early stages of short stories in Malayalam literature. His first published book was a collection of essays titled Malayalathile Janmikal. This included the essays on estate administration which he published in Kottakkal-based magazines Janmi and Lakshmivilasam. He wrote the book George Pattabhishekam at the behest of the then Malabar Collector C. A. Innes. The theme for this book was the 1911 Coronation of Emperor George in Delhi. Raghuvamsacharitram is a prose translation of the first six cantos of Raghuvamsa. Velluva Kammaran is a historical story and the translation of a story originally written by M. Othenamenon in English. This is perhaps one of Menon's most noted works. Appan Thampuran's play Munnattuveeran was based on this story. Menon wrote several stories based on historical characters. Stories like Edachena Kunkante Parakramam, Machattumalayile Bhootham and Tiruvalayam are popular. Menon was better known for his historical stories than his social stories. He published a number of short stories in magazines such as Mangalodayam. Many of them are compiled and published in two volumes of short stories. His works also include Kambaramayana and Bhargavaraman. He also wrote a biography of the Maharajah of Cochin Rama Varma XV (Sir Rama Varma: Vazhchayozhinja Kochi Rajavu or Sir Ramavarma: The Abdicated Highness).

M. R. K. C.'s stories are similar in style to that of his contemporary Oduvil Kunhikrishna Menon but M. R. K. C. based his stories on history rather than on contemporary society. Though the background is history, the characters and events were mostly imaginary and the author was not concerned about the historical accuracy of the narrative.

== Bibliography ==
Year	Title	Publisher	Notes
1908	Malayalathile Janmikal	Lakshmi Sahayam, Kottakkal	Collection of essays
1912	George Pattabhishekam	Vidya Vilasam, Calicut	Based on Coronation of George V and Mary
1919	Kochi Valiya Thampuran Thirumanassukondu	Mangalodayam, Trichur	Biography of Rama Varma XV
1921	M. R. K. C. yude Cherukathakal	Mangalodayam, Trichur	Collection of short stories in two volumes: 10 stories in Volume 1 and 4 stories in Volume 2
1921	Raghuvamsacharitram	Vidya Vilasam, Calicut	Stories from Raghuvamsa
1927	Velluva Kammaran Allenkil Sardar Sheikh Ayaz Khan	Mangalodayam, Trichur	Historical novel
1931	Bhargavaraman	Bharatha Vilasa, Trichur	Mythological stories
