= Kunjambu =

Kunjambu is a name. Notable people with the name include:

- A.V. Kunjambu (1908–1980), Indian politician
- Potheri Kunjambu Vakil (1857–1919), Malayalam poet
