= Kerala Sanchari =

Kerala Sanchari was a Malayalam-language newspaper published from Calicut in Malabar, British India. It was established by Poovadan Raman Vakil in 1886 and was printed at his Spectator Press. Vengayil Kunhiraman Nayanar was the editor for the first six months. The newspaper changed ownership soon and C. Krishnan took over as the editor under the new management. In February 1897, Moorkoth Kumaran became the editor. C. P. Govindan Nair also served as the editor for many years. Kerala Sanchari finally merged with Mithavadi which was started by Moorkoth Kumaran in 1907.
