= Uthralikavu Pooram =

Festival at a temple in Kerala, South India

Coordinates: 10°40′21″N 76°15′48″E

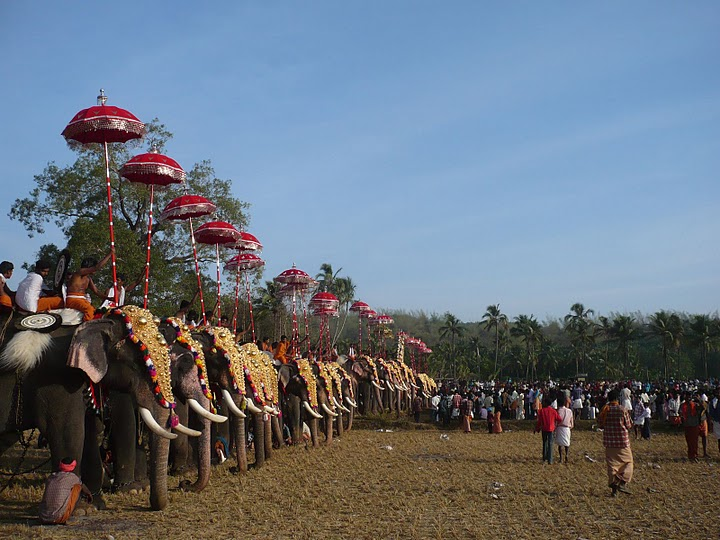
Uthralikavu Pooram

Uthralikkavu Pooram (ഉത്രാളിക്കാവ്) is a festival held at Shri Rudhiramahakalikav (ശ്രീ രുധിരമഹാകാളികാവ്) temple situated at Wadakkanchery in Thalappilly taluk of Thrissur district in Kerala, South India. The temple is famed for its Pooram festival held during February / March every year. It is considered as the second highest crowded pooram after Thrissur Pooram

== The temple ==
Uthralikkavu Temple is some two kilometres north of Wadakkanchery on the Kodungallore-Shoranur state highway. Just aside the Thrissur - Shoranur Railway line, amidst the paddy fields and surrounded by a chain of highlands and hills, the temple compound forms a rather arena-like stage where the Pooram and its associated features such as elephant procession, fireworks, percussion orchestra etc. would be held. Despite the fact that the temple is rather small in size compared to its counterparts in Kerala and that it is located at an isolated rural part of the district, during the festival season, the temple and the village raises to media attraction and news fame.

== The festival ==
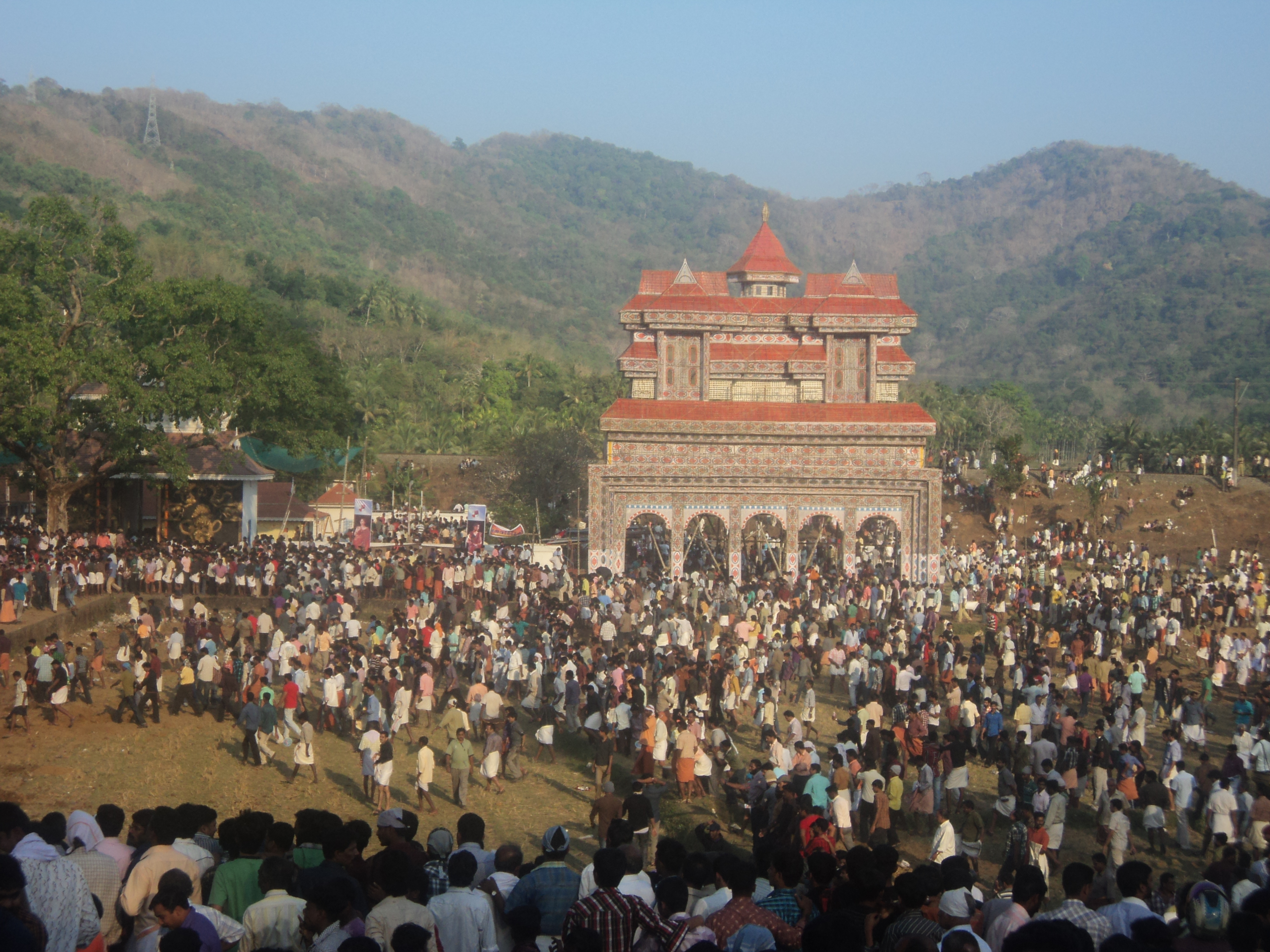
Uthralikavu pooram

The Uthralikkavu festival is conducted during early summer every year. The festival flag-hoisting (kodiyettam കൊടിയേറ്റം) takes place on the second Tuesday of Kumbha (കുംഭമാസം), the month of the Malayalam Kollam era. (This is the same day that another important local festival, Machad Mamangam(മച്ചാട് മാമാങ്കം), takes place. Towards the end of following seven days, on next Tuesday, as part of the valedictory functions, the actual Pooram is conducted.

Pooram is a Kerala Hindu ritual festival in which generally caparisoned elephants are led in a controlled and organized procession. At Uthralikkavu Pooram, three teams, each from neighboring village temples Enkakkad, Kumaranellur and Wadakanchery participate. Each team normally presents seven to eleven elephants, all decorated with traditional trunk masks (netippaTTam നെറ്റിപ്പട്ടം), shields (aalavaTTamആലവട്ടം) and fans(veNchaamaram വെൺചാമരം). The elephant positioned at the middle will also have a large plaque (thiTamp തിടമ്പ് or kOlam കോലം)on its top which represents the deity. There are many festivals in kerala used to celebrate like this. Some of them are Thrissur Pooram, Nenmara Vallangi Vela, Vairankode vela, Arattupuzha pooram, chinakathur pooram etc.

Apart from the elephant procession, at Uthralikkavu, there also held are Kuthira Vela (a procession with wooden horse) and a variety of such other events dedicated by various communities. One of the crucial components of pooram is the set of percussion orchestra (Panchavadyam, Melam etc.). Particularly, 'naTappura' (നടപ്പുര) panchavadyam is a noteworthy session of percussion performance by the leading Panchavadyam artists of Central Kerala.

Fireworks

It is the second biggest firework show after Nenmara Vallangi Vela. During the Pooram is the firework show takes place twice. First during the evening 4 pm on the Pooram day and the other during the early morning hours of succeeding day (typically at 4:00 am). Low valley surrounded by many hills adds reverberation to the festival. Tens of thousands of people gather here from various parts of the state. Nenmara Vallangi Vela is also celebrated like poorams and it is famous for the fireworks (Vedikkettu).
