= Sukumaran (surname) =

Sukumaran is an Indian surname.

People with that name:

- Ambika Sukumaran, Indian film actress in Malayalam films during the 1960s and 1970s
- Ashok Sukumaran, Japanese-born contemporary artist
- G. Sukumaran Nair, General Secretary of Nair Service Society
- Indrajith (born Indrajith Sukumaran on 17 December 1979), Indian film actor
- K. Sukumaran (journalist) (8 January 1903 - 18 September 1981), Editor of Kerala Kaumudi Daily
- K. Sukumaran (judge), former judge in the high courts of Kerala and Mumbai
- K. Sukumaran (writer) (20 May 1876 - 11 March 1956), short story writer and humourist
- M. Sukumaran (born 1943), author and short story writer in Malayalam
- Mallika Sukumaran, television actress in India
- Myuran Sukumaran, an Australian who was executed in Indonesia on 29 April 2015; he was one of the Bali 9.
- N. K. Sukumaran Nair (born 6 June 1942), environmental activist
- P. Sukumaran Nair, Indian film actor and producer
- Prithviraj Sukumaran (born 16 October 1982), an Indian film actor and producer
- R. Sukumaran, Indian film director
- T. K. Sukumaran, Indian cricketer
- Tatapuram Sukumaran (22 October 1923 – 26 October 1988), Malayalam writer
- Thikkurissy Sukumaran Nair, Malayali Indian poet, playwright, script writer, lyricist, orator, film director and actor
- Vinod Sukumaran, Indian filmmaker
