= Sanjayan =

Indian writer and journalist

- Born: June 13, 1903; Thalassery, Kannur, British India
- Died: September 13, 1943 (aged 40)
- Occupations: Writer, satirist, journalist
- Spouse: Karthyayani Amma
- Relatives: Madavil Kunjiraman Vaidyar (father); Manikkoth Paru Amma (mother)
- Writing career
- Notable works: Hasyanjali; Sakhavinte Bleach; Shunakageetham; Aalillatha Pothuyogam; Vande Bharya Matharam

Mannikoth Ramunni Nair (1903–1943), better known by his pseudonym, Sanjayan, was a Malayalam writer, journalist and one of the pioneers of satirical writing in Malayalam literature. Along with E. V. Krishna Pillai, another of the notable Malayalam satirists, Sanjayan is known to have developed the genre of light essays in the language. Besides satires, he also wrote literary criticisms and translated Othello into Malayalam language.

== Biography ==
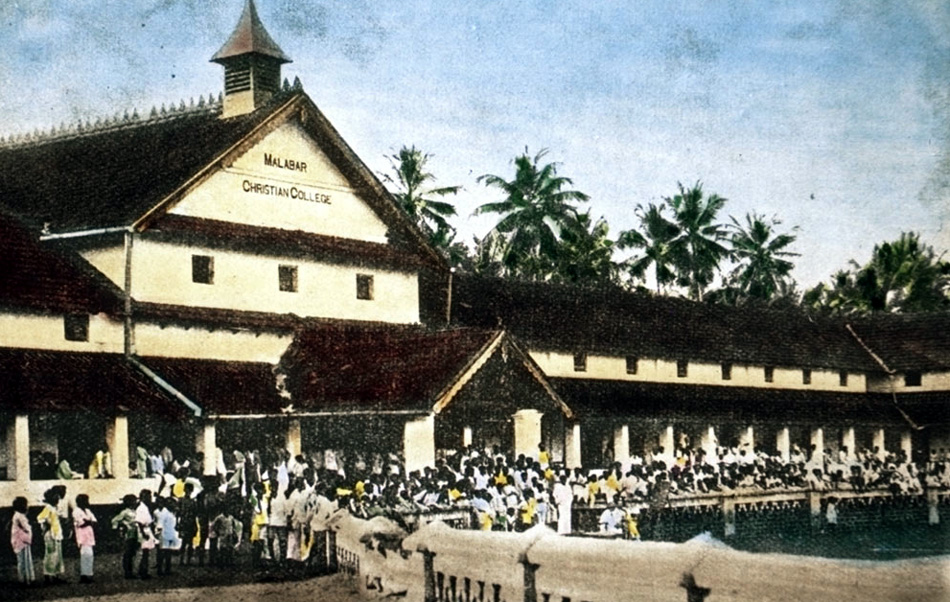
Malabar Christian College during Sanjayan's days

Recently I happened to see a report in the newspaper about a person circling the world in a single-bullock cart. I understand that the unusually hot weather this year has had this kind of effect on many people. The depth to which people are ready to stoop to get their names and photos in papers is amazing. Let me in all humility ask a question: if you circle the world in a single-bullock cart who should get the credit for it- you or the single bullock?, Excerpts from Hunting for fame by Sanjayan.

Sanjayan was born on June 13, 1903, in Thalassery, a town in Kannur District of the south Indian state of Kerala to Madavil Kunjiraman Vaidyar and Manikkoth Paru Amma. His father died when the boy was eight years old and he was brought up by his mother. He did his schooling at Brennan Branch School, the present day Government Brennen Higher Secondary School, after which he studied at Government Brennen College, Thalassery, Victoria College, Palakkad and Madras Christian College from where he earned an honours degree in English language and literature. By this time, he had already mastered Sanskrit language and had acquired a working knowledge of German and French languages. Though he started his career as a clerk in government service soon after his graduation, he resigned the job after a short while to move to teaching by joining Malabar Christian College as a member of faculty. During this period, he had a change of mind and started studying for law, passing the FL examination. However, he could not continue his studies due to personal issues but resumed the studies in 1932, studying for Bachelor of Law, which was also abandoned due to ill health; he contracted tuberculosis. While undergoing treatment and during his convalescence, he studied Vedanta and Hindu astrology. After recovering from the disease, he moved his residence to Kozhikode in 1935 to take up the editorship of Kerala Pathrika, a newspaper founded by Chengalathu Kunhirama Menon but in 1938, joined Malabar Christian College again as a faculty where he worked until 1942.

Sanjayan married Karthyayani Amma, his cousin, in 1927 and had a son from the marriage which was short-lived as his wife died in 1930. He also lost his only son in 1939. He died on September 13, 1943, at the age of 40, at his Thalassery residence.

== Legacy ==
Sanjayan's contribution to the Malayalam literature were mainly satirical essays criticizing the contemporary social state. Along with E. V. Krishna Pillai, he is considered as the pioneer of humorous and light essays in Malayalam literature. Somarajan Padinjarittam, who translated Sanjayan's writings into English under the title, Selected Works - Sanjayan, compared him to writers such as P. G. Wodehouse, Stephen Leacock, James Thurber, and Mark Twain. It is reported that, even when criticising the socio-political issues, he did not resort to personal slagging. His oeuvre is composed of satirical verses such as in Hasyanjali, literary criticisms compiled as Sahitya Nikasham and Aaru Niroopanangal and books such as Vyamayanam and Adhyopaharam. he also translated Othello of William Shakespeare into Malayalam.

Sanjayan's career as a journalist started with his assignment as the editor of Kerala Pathrika in 1935 which lasted for only a year until he founded Sanjayan, an eponymous humour journal, in 1936. Later, he was the editor-in-chief of Viswaroopam, a satirical magazine where he made satirical remarks even on such names as Vallathol Narayana Menon. He also wrote in Mathrubhumi and one of his satirical pieces on the atrocities of the British Army earned the newspaper a temporary ban.

== Bibliography ==
- Sanjayan (2016). Mangatt, Tom J. (ed.). Sanjayan Kathakal: Chiriyude Pusthakam (in Malayalam). Tamara.
- Sanjayan. Sanjayante Krithikal (in Malayalam). ASIN B07B8P3DCP.
- Sanjayan (10 November 2007). Pranayathite Thirichadi. DC Books. ISBN 978-8182643178. ASIN 8182643171.
- Sanjayan (2011). Sanjayan Sampoorna Kruthikal. Vol. 2 volumes. Mathrubhoomi Books. p. 1725. ISBN 9788182651562.
- Sanjayan. K. Gopalakrishnan (ed.). Irupathanchu Hasyalekhanangal. Lipi Publications.
- Sanjayan (2006). 101 sanjayan phalithangal. DC Books. ISBN 978-8126412662.
- Sanjayan. Sanjayante Hasya Kruthikal - Vol 1 (Ayyo Kavitha Kavitha). Kairali Books. ISBN 9789381649060.
- Sanjayan. Sanjayante Hasya Kruthikal - Vol 2 (Rudrakshamahathmyam). Kairali Books. ISBN 9789381649046.
- Sanjayan. Sanjayante Hasya Kruthikal - Vol 3 (Vandhe Bharya Matharam). Kairali Books. ISBN 9789381649053.
- Sanjayan. Sanjayante Hasya Kruthikal - Vol 4 (Njan Kuttichathanayerunnegil). Kairali Books. ISBN 9789381649077.
- Sanjayan (2011). Sanjayante Hasya Kruthikal - Vol 5 (Podippattikalum Podipattikalum). Kairali Books. ISBN 9789380696867.
- Sanjayan. Sanjayante Hasya Kruthikal - Vol 6 (Injection). Kairali Books.
- Sanjayan. Sanjayante Hasya Kruthikal - Vol 7 (Alillatha Pothuyogam). Kairali Books.
- Sanjayan. Sanjayante Hasya Kruthikal - Vol 8 (Shunakageetham). Kairali Books. ISBN 9789381649084.
- Sanjayan. Sanjayante Hasya Kruthikal - Vol 9 (Sakhavinte Bleech). Kairali Books. ISBN 9789381649091.
- Sanjayan. Sanjayante Hasya Kruthikal - Vol 10 (Hasyanjali). Kairali Books.

=== Translations ===
- William Shakespeare. Othello (in Malayalam). Translated by Sanjayan. Tamara.

=== Translations into English ===
- Sanjayan (2009). Selected Works (Sanjayan). Translated by Somarajan Padinjarittam. ASIN B004ZV5JXI.

== See also ==
- List of Indian poets
