= Nettur P. Damodaran =

Indian politician

Lok Sabha
- In office 1952–1957
- Preceded by: None
- Succeeded by: M.K. Jinachandran
- Constituency: Tellicherry

Personal details
- Born: 14 May 1913 Tellicherry, Kerala, India
- Died: 11 October 1978 (aged 65) New Delhi, India
- Party: Kisan Mazdoor Praja Party
- Spouse: Late Smt. A V Leela Damodaran
- Children: Chitra, Pradeep, Pramod, Heera
- Occupation: Politician, social activist, journalist, writer

Nettur P. Damodaran (14 May 1913 – 11 October 1978) was an Indian politician who was a member of the 1st Lok Sabha from the constituency of Tellicherry, which was part of the erstwhile Madras state. He represented the now defunct Kisan Mazdoor Praja Party. He was elected to the Lok Sabha with 42.61% of the electorate voting in his favour. Nettur P, as he was popularly known, had established his own image as a good Parliamentarian, journalist, philanthropist, reformer and writer. He graduated in Physics from Madras Christian College and it was here that his public life started when he was elected as the first elected Student Union Chairman of the College council in 1935.

Damodaran had for a brief period worked as a journalist, first in The Free Press Journal and later for Mathrubhumi in Mumbai as correspondent. He was also editor of 'Dinaprabha', a Malayalam daily published from Kozhikode in early 1960s. From 1963–66, he held senior position in the Home ministry, Government of India, as Officer on Special Duty for the welfare of Scheduled Castes and Scheduled tribes, which gave him opportunity to travel extensively all over India. His experiences during these travels gave enough material for his literary incursion in the form of travelogues. In 1967, he was appointed as the Chairman of Backward class reservation commission by the Left Democratic Front Government headed by E M S Namboodiripad. He served as chairman until the report was finalised in 1970. The report, known as Nettur Commission report stirred many a political battles in Kerala.

Damodaran was conferred with the honorary Thamrapathra on the Silver Jubilee of Indian independence by the then Prime Minister Indira Gandhi in recognition of his work towards the independence struggle.

== Early years and the freedom struggle ==
Damodaran was born to K. P. Kunhikannan and Smt. Thalu in a small hamlet called Nettur in the present day Tellicherry municipality. He did his early schooling from Mannayad school and Middle school, Illicoon in Nettur which was established by the legendary visionary and philanthropist Hermann Gundert. He later on attended Basel Evangelical Mission Parsi High School (BEMP), Tellicherry and Brennen College respectively. After graduating in Physics from Madras Christian College, he joined the Indian freedom movement from the Malabar region. He played a pivotal role in the Quit India Movement during 1942 from Tellicherry, organising rallies and public events to that effect, often giving the police a slip. During one such event, he was arrested by the authorities. This created an uproar in Tellicherry already reeling in high national spirits. He was tried and sentenced to two years in prison. He was held as a political détenu in Alipur Central jail, Bellary from 1942–44. After finishing his jail-term, he resumed his fight for India's freedom till Independence was achieved in the year 1947.

Damodaran's political life gave way to administrative career for a short spell, when he was unexpectedly chosen by Andhra Kesari T. Prakasam, then Chief Minister of Madras State, as one of the first two 'Firka' (now known as Block) development officers as part of an all India experimentation on Firka development model. He resigned from his official position in 1952 to embark on Parliamentary career by contesting the first general election of independent India from Tellicherry constituency, and winning with a thumping majority. During his tenure in the Lok Sabha (1956), he was part of a Parliamentary delegation to China when Prime Minister Zhou Enlai was in power.

== Literary works ==
Damodaran traveled extensively within India and wrote travelogues describing the local culture, people and practices. Some of his published works include:

- Narmadayude Nattil (In the land of Narmada) – a travelogue covering the course of the Narmada River.
- Adivasikalute Keralam (The Tribals of Kerala) – an authoritative work on the Tribals of Kerala
- Anubhavachurulukal (Reels of experience: Publisher: DC Books, Kottayam; 1987) – Autobiographical sketches encompassing the freedom struggle and early years of freedom

Anubhavachurulukal was republished in 2007 by Samayam Publications, Kannur.

== Social reform ==
Damodaran worked towards the uplift of socially and economically backward classes of Kerala. He was chairman of what came to be known as the Nettur Commission, formed by the government of Kerala to assess comprehensively the conditions that define backwardness of social classes in Kerala. A report of the commission's findings was submitted to the government which was subsequently published in 1971.

== Liberation of Mahé ==
Even after India attained independence from Britain, France continued to hold onto Puducherry, Mahé, Yanam, Karaikal and Chandannagar. Damodaran played a role in expediting Mahé's liberation from French rule by working in concert with Mahé liberation leaders such as I. K. Kumaran and C.E. Bharathan, and highlighting the various issues related to the struggle in parliament. Prime Minister Jawaharlal Nehru personally saw to it that the concerns raised by Damodaran and the remedies put forward by him in Parliament were addressed appropriately, helping realising the liberation of Mahe in a bloodless manner. He was actively involved in shaping and giving political lead in the formative years of independent Mahé.

== Cultural activism ==
Damodaran liked art and took various steps to popularise and promote local art forms of the Malabar region. This primarily included Kalari Payattu, an ancient martial art; Theyyam, a form of dance; and Thira, a religious ritual of northern Kerala. He was instrumental in organising various Kalari performances for the troupe of C .V.N Nair, a kalaripayattu maestro from Thalassery in Northern India and even in Ceylon (Sri Lanka). He was encouraged further by Nehru after witnessing a private performance in New Delhi. Indian circus, of which Tellicherry was the citadel, was another area of his interest and involvement. At the time of his death, he was the Secretary of the Circus Federation of India, New Delhi.
