= Vivekodayam =

- Categories: Literary magazine
- Frequency: Quarterly
- Founder: Kumaran Asan
- Founded: 1904
- First issue: April 1904, 1079 Medom 30
- Country: India
- Language: Malayalam

Vivekodayam ('Dawn of wisdom') is a Malayalam literary journal established in 1904 to serve as a voice of the underprivileged communities in the Indian state of Kerala. It was founded by Kumaran Asan, a prominent poet of Malayalam literature, social reformer, disciple of Narayana Guru and founder-secretary of the associated SNDP Yogam, who was inspired by the teachings of Swami Vivekananda (The journal name was a tribute to him.).

== History ==
Prominent poet, Kumaran Asan served as the founding editor of Vivekodayam, which published its first monthly issue in April, 1904 and it soon became the leading literary journal in Kerala. Under Asan's editorship, Vivekodayam primarily served as a voice for the social reform message of SNDP Yogam. At the same time, it covered the literary, political, and social themes and published original literary works, literary criticism, informative writings, and inspirational essays. Its fierce advocacy of the interests of the Ezhava community led to it being popularly referred to as the Ezhava Gazette. Asan continued as the editor of Vivekodayam till 1919, when he resigned shortly after his marriage.

After several years of dormancy, the journal was revived by C.R. Kesavan Vaidyar. Vivekodayam is currently published quarterly by the Kumaran Asan National Institute of Culture (KANIC), which was founded in 1958 to preserve the writings and memory of Kumaran Asan.

== Notable articles ==
Editorials written by Asan in Vivekodayam attracted widespread attention, and covered current affairs, criticism of the Government, and championed the cause of education and employment opportunities for the Ezhavas.

Vivekodayam published Asan's starkly critical reviews of three contemporary Malayali Mahakavyam's (epic poems): Chitrayogam by Vallathol, Umakeralam by Ulloor and Rugmangadacharitam by Pandalam Kerala Varma. Asan criticized these works for being conservative in form and for blindly following the norms of Sanskrit epics. His criticism caused a stir in the literary community and engendered responses from the authors, and fans, of those works followed by replies by Asan himself.

Besides original essays and criticism Vivekodayam included translations of works from other languages, such as James Allen's As a Man Thinketh, (translated by Asan; published as Manampole Mangalyam) and Swami Vivekananda's Bengali poem Nachuk Tahate Shyama (translated by Asan; published in two issues in 1904).

== Bibliography ==
- George, K. M. (1972). Makers of Indian literature. Kumaran Asan. New Delhi, India: Sahitya Akademi.
- Das, Sisir Kumar (1991). A History of Indian Literature: Western impact: Indian response, 1800–1910. Sahitya Akademi. ISBN 978-81-7201-006-5.
- Sadasivan, S.N. (2000). A Social History of India. APH Publishing. ISBN 978-81-7648-170-0.
- Kesavan, Bellary Shamanna (1988). History of Printing and Publishing in India: A Story of Cultural Re-awakening (Vol. 2).
