= Nettur =

- village
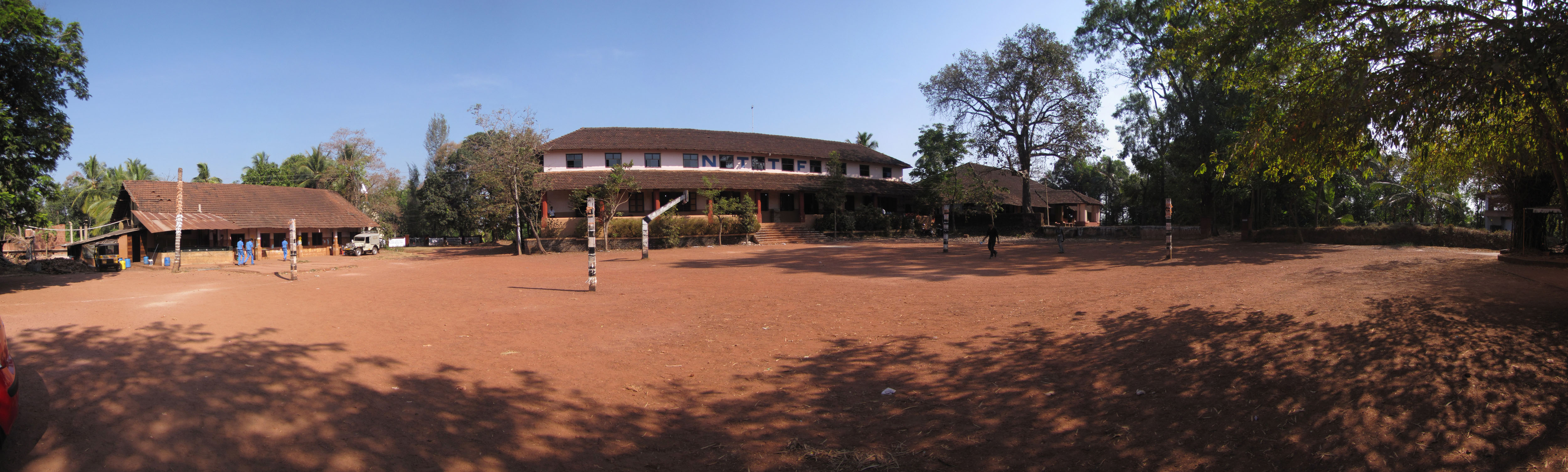
- Nettur Institute

- Location in Kerala, India Nettur (India)
- Coordinates: 11°46′7.02″N 75°28′49.86″E
- Country: India
- State: Kerala
- District: Kannur

Government
  - Body: Thalassery

Languages
  - Official: Malayalam, English
- Time zone: UTC+5:30 (IST)
- ISO 3166 code: IN-KL
- Vehicle registration: KL-
- Civic agency: Thalassery

Nettur is a village segment which comes under the jurisdiction of Thalassery municipality, in the state of Kerala, India. It is situated in North Thalassery en route to Kannur via NH 17. The Anjarakandi-Thalassery state Highway passes through Nettur. Nettur is picturesquely nestled between the Kuyyali and Anjarakandi rivers.

== Nettur Institute ==
NTTF, a renowned technical training institute was established in Nettur in 1959 by the CSI and the Hilfswerk der Evangelischen Kirchen der Schweiz, Switzerland. A bungalow occupied by the renowned German missionary, scholar and lexicographer, Rev. Hermann Gundert better known as Gundert Bungalow is situated atop Illicoon hill in Nettur, close to the present day NTTF campus. Rev. Hermann Gundert stayed in Illikkunnu, Nettur since 1839 and most of his literary works including the first English-Malayalam dictionary were published during this period. It was in Nettur that the German missionaries introduced weaving mills in a large scale, which later spread to Kannur and beyond, where the handloom sector evolved into a major source of revenue and employment.

== History ==
Nettur has a significant role to play in the evolution of news media in Kerala. It was in Nettur in the year 1847 that the first Malayalam newspaper Rajyasamacharam was published. It was published out of Gundert Bungalow by Basel Missionaries for the purpose of religious propagation until the year 1850. Rajyasamacharam was first published in the month of June, 1847. It was in October of the same year that another Malayalam newspaper Paschimodayam was first published elsewhere in Thalassery.

== Temples ==
Chirakakkavu temple is a famous Hindu temple located in Nettur. Renowned freedom fighter and Member of Parliament, Nettur P Damodaran hails from Nettur. Late Moorkoth Kumaran, author, ardent disciple of Sree Narayana Guru and renowned social worker, taught at the then Middle school in Nettur, in the present premises of NTTF. The school was later upgraded and shifted to Thalassery town, which is now known as BEMP High School

== Transportation ==
The national highway passes through Thalassery town. Goa and Mumbai can be accessed on the northern side and Cochin and Thiruvananthapuram can be accessed on the southern side. The road to the east of Iritty connects to Mysore and Bangalore. The nearest railway station is Thalassery on Mangalore-Palakkad line. Trains are available to almost all parts of India subject to advance booking over the internet. Kannur airport is 24 km away. Both of them are international airports but direct flights are available only to Middle Eastern countries.
