= Kunhiraman Palat Candeth =

Former general in the Indian army

Lieutenant General Kunhiraman Palat Candeth PVSM

Military Governor of Goa, Daman and Diu
- In office 19 December 1961 – 6 June 1962
- Preceded by: Post Established
- Succeeded by: T. Sivasankar (as Lieutenant Governor of Goa, Daman and Diu)

Personal details
- Born: 23 September 1916 Ottapalam, Malabar District, Madras Presidency, British India
- Died: 19 May 2003 (aged 86)
- Party: Bharatiya Janata Party
- Relations: Sir C. Sankaran Nair (Maternal Grandfather); Vengayil Kunhiraman Nayanar (Paternal Grandfather); Sir C. Madhavan Nair (Maternal Uncle)
- Awards: Padma Bhushan; Param Vishisht Seva Medal

Military service
- Allegiance: British India; Republic of India
- Branch/service: British Indian Army; Indian Army
- Years of service: 1934–1973
- Rank: Lieutenant General
- Unit: Royal Indian Artillery
- Commands: Western Army; 8 Mountain Division; 17 Infantry Division
- Battles/wars: World War II; Indo-Pakistan War of 1947; Operation Vijay; Indo-Pakistan War of 1965; Indo-Pakistan War of 1971

Lieutenant General Kunhiraman Palat Candeth, PVSM (23 September 1916 – 19 May 2003) was a senior officer in the Indian Army who played a commanding role in the Liberation of Goa from Portuguese control in 1961, and briefly served as the Military Governor of Goa, Daman and Diu.

He later served as the Deputy Chief of Army Staff based in GHQ in New Delhi during the second war in 1965, and later effectively commanded the Western Command during the third war with Pakistan in 1971.

== Early life ==
He was born in Ottapalam, Malabar District (now Kerala) in British India (now India) to Palat Candeth Madhavi Amma and Arathil Candeth Madhavan Nambiar "M. A. Candeth", the son of the Nayanar landlord and writer Vengayil Kunhiraman Nayanar.

Kunhiraman belongs to the Palat Candeth family, through matrilineal succession.

His maternal grandfather was C. Sankaran Nair, who was the President of the Indian National Congress. His paternal uncle is A. C. N. Nambiar, who is an Indian Nationalist and involved with the Indian Legion during the Second World War.

== Military career ==
=== Pre-independence ===
Commissioned into the Royal Artillery in 1936, Candeth saw action in West Asia during the Second World War. Shortly before India's independence from colonial rule, he was deployed in the North West Frontier Province, bordering Afghanistan, to quell local tribal uprisings. The mountainous terrain gave Candeth the experience for his later operations against Nagaland separatists in the North East. He attended the Military Services Staff College at Quetta, capital of Baluchistan in 1945.

=== Kashmir 1947 ===
After Independence, Candeth was commanding 16 Field Regiment, an artillery regiment that was deployed to Jammu and Kashmir after Pakistan-backed tribesmen attacked and captured a third of the province before being forced back by the Indian Army. Thereafter, Candeth held a series of senior appointments, including that of Director General of Artillery at Army Headquarters in Delhi, to which he was appointed on 8 September 1959, with the acting rank of major-general (substantive colonel).

=== Goa ===
Following Indian independence from British rule, certain parts of India were still under foreign rule. While the French left India in 1954, the Portuguese, however, refused to leave. After complex diplomatic pressure and negotiations had failed, on 18 December 1961 Defence Minister V.K. Krishna Menon ordered the military to overrun Goa and oust the Portuguese. Candeth, whose father was close to Menon, all three of them being related as elite Nairs, was chosen by Menon to command in Operation Vijay—the Annexation of Goa, Daman and Diu from Portuguese rule. In an obituary tribute to Candeth, The Independent of London however referred to him as "born into a middle-class Anglo-Indian family" while early scholarly references also referred to him as Kenneth P. Candeth. As 17 Infantry Division commander, Candeth took the colony within a day and was immediately appointed Goa's first Indian administrator (acting as the Military Governor), a post he held till June 1962. Controversial as the military action was, Candeth inevitably received critical coverage in the western press, although the primary brunt of criticism was Menon, followed by Nehru.

=== North East ===
After relinquishing command as Goa's Military Governor in 1963, Candeth was appointed GOC, Nagaland on 23 August 1963. He took command of the newly raised 8 Mountain Division in the North-East on 15 November 1963, where he battled, although with little success, the highly organised Naga insurgents. The insurgency in the North East has not been quelled completely to this day. On 7 May 1965, he was appointed Deputy Chief of the Army Staff (DCOAS) with the acting rank of lieutenant-general. He was promoted to lieutenant-general on 17 January 1966, and was appointed GOC-in-C, Western Command on 27 September 1969.

== Awards and later life ==
Lt. Gen. Kunhiraman Palat Candeth was awarded the Param Vishisht Seva Medal and also the Padma Bhushan by the Government of India. Retiring from the army on 21 October 1972, he joined the Bharatiya Janata Party (BJP) in the 1990s and was appointed a member of the Party's Executive Committee.

== Dates of rank ==
Insignia	Rank	Component	Date of rank
	Second Lieutenant	British Indian Army	15 July 1937 (seniority 30 August 1936)
	Lieutenant	British Indian Army	30 November 1938
	Captain	British Indian Army	1940 (acting); 1 January 1941 (temporary); 30 August 1944 (substantive)
	Captain	Indian Army	15 August 1947 (Note: Upon independence in 1947, India became a Dominion within the British Commonwealth of Nations. As a result, the rank insignia of the British Army, incorporating the Tudor Crown and four-pointed Bath Star ("pip"), was retained, as George VI remained Commander-in-Chief of the Indian Armed Forces. After 26 January 1950, when India became a republic, the President of India became Commander-in-Chief, and the Ashoka Lion replaced the crown, with a five-pointed star being substituted for the "pip.")
	Brigadier	Indian Army	1948 (acting)
	Major	Indian Army	30 August 1949
	Major	Indian Army	26 January 1950 (recommissioning and change in insignia)
	Lieutenant-Colonel	Indian Army	1953
	Colonel	Indian Army	30 August 1956
	Brigadier	Indian Army	30 August 1959
	Major General	Indian Army	8 September 1959 (acting)
	Lieutenant-General	Indian Army	7 May 1965 (acting); 11 January 1966 (substantive)

== See also ==
- Operation Vijay
- World War II
- Vengayil Kunhiraman Nayanar

== Notes ==
Military offices
Preceded by Moti Sagar	Deputy Chief of the Army Staff; 1965-1966	Succeeded by Jagjit Singh Aurora
Preceded by Harbaksh Singh	General Officer Commanding-in-Chief Western Command; 1969-1972	Succeeded by M. L. Thapan
