= Murkot Kunhappa =

Indian journalist

Murkoth Kunhappa was a bureaucrat and, later, a journalist.

== Early life ==
He was born on May 14, 1905, and was the eldest son of Moorkoth Kumaran, a popular Malayalam short story writer and social reformer. He was an associate editor of Malayala Manorama, a leading Malayalam daily newspaper, from 1966 until his death in 1993, during which he was a dominant presence in the cultural life of Kerala. Like his father, he was a follower of Sree Narayana Gurudevan. He produced many books, writing in English and Tamil as well as in Malayalam: they include Sree Narayana Guru (National Biography), Jivithasmaranakal (Reminiscences), a biography of Mammen Mappilai (the founder of Malayala Manorama) and an English-language children's book, Three bags of gold and other Indian folk tales, which has attracted the interest of students of literature in several American universities. In 1990, he contributed Kalaripayyat to Crossovers: Explorations across Disciplines and Martial Arts, which was published in 1995 by Seagull Theatre Quarterly.

== See also ==
- Moorkoth Ramunni His brother and a disciple of Sree Narayana Guru.
