= Enkakkad =

- Village
- Location in Kerala, India Enkakkad (India)
- Coordinates: 10°39′0″N 76°15′0″E
- Country: India
- State: Kerala
- District: Thrissur

Government
  - Type: Panchayati raj (India)
  - Body: Gram panchayat

Population (2011)
  - Total: 9,584

Languages
  - Official: Malayalam, English
- Time zone: UTC+5:30 (IST)
- PIN: 680589
- Vehicle registration: KL-8
- Nearest city: Thrissur

Enkakkad is a village in Thrissur district in the state of Kerala, India. It is a small village with beautiful nature. There are many temples like the Shri Veeranimangalam temple, Shri Kovil, etc. in this village. The famous temple Uthralikavu is in Enkakkad, where the Uthralikavu Pooram festival takes place every year. Enkakkad is the birthplace of Oduvil Kunhikrishna Menon (writer), Bharathan (film director), Oduvil Unnikrishnan and KPAC Lalitha (actors).

== Demographics ==
As of the 2011 census of India, Enkakkad had a population of 9,584 with 4,420 males and 5,054 females.
