= Mithavadi =

Malayalam-language newspaper

Mithavadi was a Malayalam-language newspaper published from Tellicherry and later from Calicut in Malabar, British India. It was established by T. Sivasankaran in 1907. Moorkoth Kumaran was the editor. He merged his Kerala Sanchari newspaper with Mithavadi.Mithavadi aimed at promoting social reforms and uplifting marginalized sections of the society.

In 1913, C. Krishnan purchased the newspaper by the impetus and advice from the great renaissance leader and social reformer of that times Rao Sahib Dr. Ayyathan Gopalan and published it from his Empire Press at Calicut. Initially It was published as a Monthly from 1913 to 1921 and then later as a weekly until 1938. Mithavadi was particularly popular among the Thiyya community and was instrumental in pioneering tenant agitations in Malabar.
