= Ponnapuramkottayil Kelu Moopan =

17th-century Indian warrior

Ponnapuram Kottayil Kelu Moopan, also known as Punnapuram kottayil kelu Moopan or Kelu Moopan Chekon was a warrior who lived in the 17th century.
