= Karayi Krishnan Gurukkal =

Indian poet

Karayi Krishnan Gurukkal was born in 1855 at Otayothu house in Chirakkal taluk, Kannur of North Malabar. He came to be known as a man with extraordinary poetic ability. Although he excelled as a writer, in Poetry, and linguistics, he did not live long, dying in 1888. Karayi Krishnan Gurukkal was one of the most notable writers in failed Kerala. He was also a prominent figure in Sanskrit and Malayalam. His two brothers, Karai Katti and Karai Bapu, were businessmen and wealthy.

== Bibliography ==
- Ramayana Mani pravasam
- adhithya hrudhayam
- slogangal
- lakshmanaparinayam ottanthullal
