= Nachuk Tahate Shyama =

Poem by Swami Vivekananda

- by Vivekananda
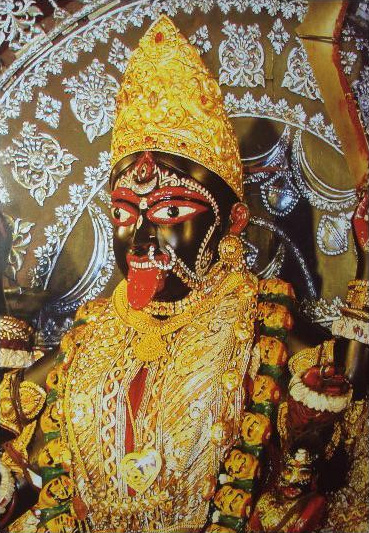
- Hindu goddess Shyama, whom the poet worshipped in this poem
- Original title: নাচুক তাহাতে শ্যামা
- Country: India
- Language: Bengali
- Publisher: Vivekodayam
- Publication date: 1904

Nachuk Tahate Shyama, (translated as "And Let Shyama Dance There" or "Let Shyama Dance There"), is a Bengali language poem written by Vivekananda. The poem was later included in the Fourth volume of The Complete Works of Swami Vivekananda. The long poem relates to one's surrender to the Hindu goddess Shyama or Kali, and is also interpreted as "Let Kali dance there" a poem dedicated to Kali.

== Lyrics ==
The first stanza of the poem (in English and Bengali) are given below. Read the full poem at Wikisource.

English version

Beaut'ous blossoms ravishing with perfume,
Swarms of maddened bees buzzing all around;
The silver moon—a shower of sweet smile,
Which all the dwellers of heaven above
Shed lavishly upon the homes of earth;
The soft Malaya breeze, whose magic touch
Opens to view distant memory's folds;
Murmuring rivers and brooks, rippling lakes
With restless Bhramaras wheeling over
Gently waving lotuses unnumbered;
Foaming flow cascades—a streaming music—
To which echo mountain caves in return;
Warblers, full of sweet-flowing melody,
Hidden in leaves, pour hearts out—love discourse;
The rising orb of day, the painter divine,
With his golden brush but lightly touches
The canvas earth and a wealth of colours
Floods at once o'er the bosom of nature,
—Truly a museum of lovely hues—
Waking up a whole sea of sentiments.

Bengali version

ফুল্ল ফুল সৌরভে আকুল, মত্ত অলিকুল গুঞ্জরিছে আশে পাশে।
শুভ্র শশী যেন হাসিরাশি, যত স্বর্গবাসী বিতরিছে ধরাবাসে ।।
মৃদুমন্দ মলয়পবন, যার পরশন, স্মৃতিপট দেয় খুলে।
নদী, নদ, সরসী-হিল্লোল, ভ্রমর চঞ্চল, কত বা কমল দোলে ।।
ফেনময়ী ঝরে নির্ঝরিণী-তানতরঙ্গিণী-গুহা দেয় প্রতিধ্বনি ।
স্বরময় পতত্রিনিচয়, লুকায়ে পাতায়, শুনায় সোহাগবাণী ।।
চিত্রকর, তরুণ ভাস্কর, স্বর্ণতুলিকর, ছোঁয় মাত্র ধরাপটে।
বর্ণখেলা ধরাতল ছায়, রাগপরিচয় ভাবরাশি জেগে ওঠে ।।

== Theme ==
Vivekananda dealt with the world of consciousness in this poem. The poem is a fervent appeal of the spiritually oriented luminary to face head on the bad aspects of life, not to be slave to the easy way of life but to address problems of the universe with a positive approach to bring happiness in others' lives. It is in the traditional literature of Bengal, and is a search of the “soul from personal; to divine love and from Kali to Brahma.

According to Indian historian Ramesh Chandra Majumdar the poem included references to natural features, "the charm of sex", and "maddening wine of love". Swami Vivekananda made an English version of his poem, titled "'And Let Shyama Dance There". Ramesh Chandra Majumdar wrote that the English poem "gives a somewhat unique pen-picture of sweet and grim aspects of Nature alternated with telling effect, which shows a literary artist's imageries at their best."

Mohit Chakrabarti, author of Swami Vivekananda, Poetic Visionary, wrote that there is a pictorial element suggested through symbols in the grapes "has also the elements of consciousness with which the poet prepares us for the terrible atmosphere where Shyama would dance in full fury." Chakrabarti also wrote that the imagery of the lips and eyes with the heart "bring forth a perfect image of Shyama who dominates the whole situation with brilliance beyond the range of consciousness".

== Influence ==
Ratna Ghosh, author of Netaji Subhas Chandra Bose and Indian Freedom Struggle: Subhas Chandra Bose : his ideas and vision, stated that the poem "instilled an attraction for the unknown into the mind of" Subhas Chandra Bose, and that he "very often recited the poem with such an unbounded impetuosity as if it seemed he got an image of his own ideal in it."

Subhas Chandra Bose was deeply impressed by this poem for its attraction to the unknown or metaphysical. He often repeated it in rapturous "unbounded impetuosity" according to his understanding of the poem.
