= Chengalath Valiya Kunhirama Menon =

Newspaper editor

Chengalath Kunhirama Menon
- Born: 1857
- Died: 1935 (aged 77–78)
- Occupation: Journalist

Chengalath Kunhirama Menon (1857–1935) was the founder/editor of Kerala Pathrika—first and earliest Malayalam newspaper published from Kozhikode, Calicut Kerala during 1885. Menon is often referred to as Chengalathu Valiya Kunhirama Menon; the appellation Valiya (big or senior) is used to distinguish him from his nephew and well-known story writer Chengalathu Cheriya Kunhirama Menon popularly known with reversed initials M. R. K. C.

Kunhirama Menon was one of the first five graduates of erstwhile Malabar, completing his bachelor's degree at the Maharajah's College Trivandrum, in Kerala. He represented Malabar and attended the first Indian National Congress in 1885. He also met Bipin Pal, who suggested that Menon start a newspaper from Kerala, supporting the National movement. Financial help to start a newspaper was provided by Appu Nedungadi and Kannambra Valiya Unni Nair. Menon also attended the 1890 editor's conference in England with Kasturiranga Iyengar of The Hindu. The editor placed emphasis on promoting nationalistic feelings and opposing the autocratic functioning of the government. Kunhirama was highly impressed with the working of Amrita Bazar Pathrika of Calcutta newspaper. It is said this was the first congress newspaper in Malayalam. Kerala Pathrika was published for a long time. After a short interruption in 1930 the paper resumed publication in 1938. Later this newspaper continued publication from Cochin in 1947.

Menon was conferred the title of Rao Sahib by the Governor General of India as a personal distinction.
