= Kerala Pathrika =

Malayalam language newspaper in India

Kerala Pathrika was the first and earliest Malayalam language newspaper based in Calicut, India. Its first issue was published on 19 October 1884. Chengalathu Kunhirama Menon was the founder and chief editor of the paper.

== History ==
The first issue of Kerala Patrika was published on October 19, 1884. Kunhirama Menon started the newspaper to support the national movement. Financial help to start a newspaper was provided by two important persons of Malabar, Appu Nedungadi and Kannambra Valiya Unni Nair. Kunhirama Menon also attended the 1890 editors’ conference in England with S. Kasturi Ranga Iyengar of The Hindu. The editor placed emphasis on promoting nationalistic feelings and opposing the autocratic functioning of the government. Menon was highly impressed with the working of the Calcutta-based Amrita Bazar Patrika. It is said that Kerala Patrika was the first Malayalam newspaper aligned with the Indian National Congress. After a short interruption in 1930, the paper resumed publication in 1938. Later this newspaper continued publication from Cochin in 1947 for some time. Sanjayan, the noted satirist, was the editor of the newspaper for a short period from 1935.
