= Vasanavikriti =

1891 short story by Vengayil Kunhiraman Nayanar

"Vasanavikruti" is a short story written by Vengayil Kunhiraman Nayanar. It is considered by historians and literary experts as the first short story in Malayalam literature. It was published in Vidya Vinodini magazine in 1891. The narration of the story is a bit of humour based.

== Plot ==
This is the story about Ikkandavaryakurupu. He is traditionally a thief. He was jailed for theft and after coming back from the 6 months of jail, Ikkandakkuruppu is planning to have a good life.
