= Moorkoth Ramunni =

Royal Indian Air Force pilot

Moorkoth Ramunny
- Born: 15 September 1915
- Died: 9 July 2009 (aged 93)
- Occupation: pilot
- Known for: Writer, administrator

Moorkoth Ramunni (15 September 1915 – 9 July 2009) was a Malayali fighter pilot in the Royal Indian Air Force, and the first Indian Administrative officer from Dharmadam village. the youngest son of Moorkoth Kumaran.

He was an aviator from Kerala of the Royal Indian Air Force (later Indian Air Force). He was a Hurricane pilot in 1st Squadron that saw action against Japan in the Arakan Campaign in the Second World War. He worked in the Cabinet Secretariat in 1947. He was one among the ten people who were appointed to look after the tribes for 25 years. He was the advisor of the governors of the states Nagaland, Manipur, Tripura. He also assumed the position of the administrator of Lakshadweep. First pilot from Kerala and (Having converted subsequently to the IAS) an administrator. The First Head of Training Team of The Indian National Defence Academy.

== Biography ==
He was born on 15 September 1915, the son of Murkot Kumaran and Yashoda. He was educated at St. Joseph's School, Thalassery, BEMP School, Brennan College and Madras Presidency College. After graduating from Presidency College, he joined the Madras Flying Club and became the first licensed Air Force pilot in Kerala. Captain Tyndale Bisco was a World War I pilot, and Ramunni was the only Malayalee to fly an Indian Air Force aircraft against Japan during World War II. Prior to independence, he joined the British Royal Air Force and after training in Secunderabad, Ambala and Peshawar, flew fighter jets for the 2nd, 4th and 6th Squadrons of the Air Force. Appointed by the then Prime Minister Jawaharlal Nehru.
