= Mithavaadi Krishnan =

Indian journalist and social reformer (1867-1938)

- Born: C Krishnan; 11 June 1867; Kerala, India
- Died: 29 November 1938 (aged 71)
- Education: Presidency college chennai
- Occupations: Advocate, social reformer, socialist, periodical publisher

Changaramkumarath Krishnan Vakkeel was a community leader, banker, social reformer, and journalist from Kerala, India. He was a champion of implementing the revolutionary socialist reforms proposed by Sree Narayana Guru for the upliftment of the downtrodden people of Kerala. He was called Mithavathi―a minimalist―after the newspaper he published from 1913 to 1938 to spread the message of the reformist movement. He was well-educated and hailed from an influential family. Although he could have entered the government service and risen to higher positions with his education and wealth, he renounced all these for the liberation of the backward classes from the clutch of pathological social system.

When the kings and the ruling class passed oppressive laws against the weak sections of the people, Mithavadi protested through its editorials that their judgments were against poor people. It also pointed out that the true owners of the land were the people and not the kings or the people in power. It reminded the King of Travancore of the Russian rulers who were overthrown by the revolutionaries and asked his highness to take this as an indication.

== Biography ==
C. Krishnan was born in Mullassery, Thrissur on 11 June 1867. He took over the Mithavadi in 1913 which was initially started as a monthly newspaper(Magazine) from Thalassery. It featured articles and writings regarding the socially depressed classes and was a voice for the rights of the depressed classes.It was known as the "Bible of the socially oppressed". Dr. Ayyathan Gopalan a great social reformer of Kerala, during those times, was the one who gave C. Krishnan the impetus, advice to take over Mithavadi and helped him to start this as a newspaper. Mithavadi started its publication from Calicut as a monthly from 1913 to 1921 through empire press Calicut and then as a weekly until 1938. C. Krishnan was initially a follower of Dr. Ayyathan Gopalan and Brahmosamaj and worked together with Dr. Ayyathan Gopalan in his social reform activities. He worked as the secretary of Calicut Brahmosamaj for many years. Later on he got interest in the philosophy of Buddhism.

The Kochi metro entrance has the history of the Kerala press and C. Krishnan is listed amongst the first under 1907. It says "Mithavadi – From Tellicherry marks the next important milestone in the history of the press in Kerala. It published a daily news sheet featuring the latest news from the war front during the First World War. Separately, the Government of Kerala states "The Mitavadi was in the forefront of the movement for social reforms and the uplift of the weaker sections of society".

C. Krishnan was a follower of Sree Narayana Guru. He was a leader of the Sree Narayana Dharma Paripalana Yogam and was active in organizing the meetings of the northern Malabar district his area of Kerala. He participated in many SNDP yogam conventions and chaired its 9th anniversary at sivagiri along with the consecration ceremony of ‘Sharada’ temple there. He was an excellent organizer and fund raiser for the SNDP. He was appointed the Dharmakartha of all the Ashram properties. He actively participated in Vaikom Satyagraha. In 1907 Krishnan (along with Kalingalmadom Rarichan Moopan of the famous Kallingal Madom) invited Sree Narayana Guru to Malabar. The guru accepted the invitation and visited many places in Malabar.

C. Krishnan however did not support the freedom movement, and was against the Indian National Congress and Mahatma Gandhi. He supported the British rule because he believed that freedom for rule without freedom from serfdom was meaningless. He blamed Gandhiji for his failure to prevent the Malabar rebellion. He wanted the freedom of the oppressed classes to be attained before the nation achieved freedom.

== See also ==
- Sree Narayana Guru
- Dr. Palpu
- Kumaranasan
- Rao Sahib Dr. Ayyathan Gopalan
- Moorkoth Kumaran
- Brahmananda Swami Sivayogi
- Vaghbhatananda gurudevar
