= Muliyil Krishnan =

Indian linguist (1845–1901)

Muliyil Krishnan (1845–1901) B.A., B.L., was also one of the pioneers of the 19th century in the Kannur district, making his mark as a linguist among the rare few who received higher education. He got a job as a Malayalam teacher from Kannur with a salary of Rs.1000. Before becoming a professor of Malayalam at Madras Presidency College, he was earning up to Rs 30 per month. Several scholarly grammars have been written by eminent native linguists such as A. R. Raja Raja Varma, M. A., M. R. A. S., and Messrs. Seshagiri Prabhu and Muliyil Krishnan. Regarding the lexicography of the language, after the publishing of the dictionaries of the Verapolic missionaries, Mr. Bailey's Dictionary was published in 1846.
