= Bhashaposhini =

Monthly Indian Magazine

Bhashaposhini is an Indian monthly magazine. It is one of the oldest Malayalam literary review magazines.

== History and profile ==
Bhashaposhini was first published in 1892 as a literary journal of the Bhashaposhini Sabha. The founding editor was Kandathil Varghese Mappillai. In 1895, it merged with another magazine Vidyavinodini. However, after three years, in 1897, resumed as an independent journal again. It continued to be an important and authentic periodical until 1942. After a long break, in 1977 June, the magazine was revived by the Malayala Manorama group of publications. It is one of the significant Malayalam periodical that is published monthly.

Contributions include Kerala Varma Valiyakoyi Thampuran, Ulloor, Muloor S.Padmanabha Panicker, Kattakkayathil Cheriyan Mappilai and Moorkoth Kumaran.
