= Vidyavinodini =

- Part of the first page of the M.E. 1068 Makaram (c. December 1892) edition of Vidyavinodini
- Former editors: C. P. Achutha Menon, Appu Nedungadi, T. K. Krishna Menon, Palliyil Gopala Menon
- Categories: Literary magazine
- Frequency: Monthly
- First issue: November 1889
- Final issue: March 1902
- Company: V. Sundarayyar & Sons
- Country: Cochin
- Language: Malayalam

Vidyavinodini or Vidya Vinodini (Malayalam: വിദ്യാവിനോദിനി) was a Malayalam-language monthly literary magazine published from Trichur in the Kingdom of Cochin (now part of India). It started publication in November 1889 and ceased publication in March 1902.

== History ==
Vidyavinodini Press was established in 1886 (Malayalam Era 1062). It was run by V. Sundarayyar and his son Viswanathayyar, the owners of Trichur-based V. Sundarayyar & Sons. They started the magazine in 1889 with C. P. Achutha Menon as the editor and Viswanathayyar as the manager. Initially, the magazine was printed in Kalpadrumam Press, Trichur, and later, in 1900, in Vidyavinodini Press.

The first issue of Vidyavinodini was published in November 1889. Vidya Vilasini, the first magazine in Malayalam, had ceased publication around this time, which helped Vidyavinodini establish itself as a power in the land. Vidyavinodini was able to contribute to the literary, cultural, and scientific fields of Kerala for more than a decade. This magazine published 150 issues (twelve books and six issues) until it ceased publication in March 1902. The magazine had changed its name to Vidyavinodini Vakthavu in its final years.

After the resignation of C. P. Achutha Menon in 1898, Appu Nedungadi, T. K. Krishna Menon, and Palliyil Gopala Menon also served as the editors of Vidyavinodini.

Vidyavinodini was not just a literary magazine. Instead, the magazine covered history, culture, finance, agriculture, and science. C. S. Gopala Panicker, who specialised in natural science, was the chief science reporter of Vidyavinodini. The magazine, which Palliyil Gopala Menon finally owned, ceased operations in March 1902. The place of Vidyavinodini was filled up for a time by Rasika Ranjini, a monthly that was owned and conducted by H. H. Rama Varma Appan Thampuran of Cochin.

== Trivia ==
"Vasanavikriti", the first short story in Malayalam, was published in c. February 1891 in the M.E. Kumbham 1066 edition of Vidyavinodini (Volume 2 Issue 3).
