= Vengayil Kunhiraman Nayanar =

Indian writer

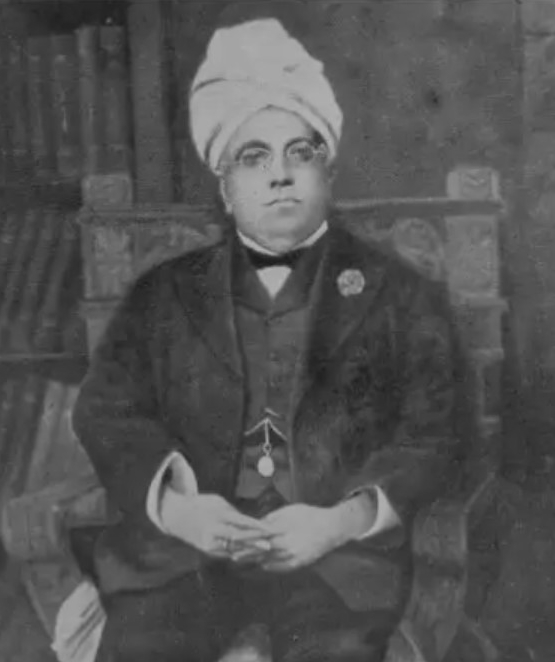
- Vengayil Kunhiraman Nayanar
- Born: 1860; Malabar district, British India
- Died: 14 November 1914 (aged 53–54); Malabar district, British India
- Occupation: Writer
- Writing career
- Genres: Short Story, Essay, Criticism
- Notable work: Vasanavikriti

Vengayil Kunhiraman Nayanar (1860 – 14 November 1914) was a Malayali essayist and short story writer, and a prominent Jenmi of Malabar district.

== Early life and education ==
Kunhiraman Nayanar was born to Vengayil Kunhakkam Amma and Puliyappadappu Haridasan Somayajipad, from Perinchellor Graamam, Taliparamba. His early education was in Sanskrit, and later joined the English school at Taliparamba, followed by the Saidampetta Agricultural College in Calicut. In 1904 he became a member of the Malabar District Board, and in 1907 was elected to the Madras Legislative Assembly. He died while serving as a member there on 14 November 1914, aged 54.

=== Vengayil family ===
Nayanar belongs to the Vengayil family, through matrilineal succession. The Vengayil family is an aristocratic Nair family in Chirakal Taluk, Northern part of Malabar district in British India. The Vengayil Nayanar tharavad were a significant land-owning family of Malabar district in the 1800s in British India. They, at the time, owned more than 200,000 acres (810 km square) of land including vast forest lands. .The land directly under the ownership of the Vengayil family was comparable to the size of the 13-gun salute princely state of Kapurthala State (352 square miles (910 km2)), and 11-gun salute Morvi State (242 square miles (630 km2))

== Literature ==
Nayanar came to the literary world through Kerala Pathrika (started in 1884 by C. Kunhiraman Menon (1854–1936) and Appu Nedungadi (1860–1934) at Calicut). He was also closely associated with periodicals like Vidya Vinodini (started in 1889 at Trichur under the editorship of C. P. Achutha Menon), Kerala Chandrika (started in 1879 at Trivandrum), Kerala Sanchari (after 1898 under the editorship of Murkoth Kumaran), Kerala Pathrika and the English Journal Malabar Spectator. He wrote the first Malayalam short story, Vasanavikriti. Under the pen names "Kesari", "Vajrasoochi","Vajrabahu", Vengayil Kunhiraman Nayanar's works obtained wide appreciation from all over South India. Kesari was a sharp critic of social reality, criticising social inequalities. He was also a close friend of Dr. Hermann Gundert and William Logan who did a lot of research on the history, language, and culture of Kerala.

== Family ==
V. K. Nayanar married Arathil Candeth Kallyani Amma. His sons were Narayanan (known as A. C. N. Nambiar) and Madhavan (known as M. A. Candeth) whose son was Kunhiraman Palat Candeth

A. C. N. Nambiar is an Indian Nationalist and involved with the Indian Legion during the Second World War.

K. P. Candeth is a Lieutenant General in the Indian Army and first Governor of Goa,

== Works ==
Some of Vengayil Kunhiraman Nayanar's works are lost. Most of his works were published in periodicals such as Vidya Vinodini, Saraswathi and Kerala Pathrika. Some of his works are compiled by Prof. K. Gopalakrishnan and published by Mathrubhumi under the title Kesari Nayanarude Krithikal.

Stories

- Vengayil Kunhiraman Nayanar (1891). "Vasanavikriti". Vidya Vinodini. Vol. 2, no. 5.
- Vengayil Kunhiraman Nayanar (1893). "Menokkiye Konnatharanu". Vidya Vinodini. Vol. 4, no. 7.
- Vengayil Kunhiraman Nayanar (1893). "Dwaraka". Vidya Vinodini. Vol. 4, no. 9.
- Vengayil Kunhiraman Nayanar (1900). "Ente Anubhavam". Vidya Vinodini.
- Vengayil Kunhiraman Nayanar (n.d.). "Madirashi Pithalattam". Saraswathi.
- Vengayil Kunhiraman Nayanar (n.d.). "Oru Pottabhagyam". Saraswathi.
- Vengayil Kunhiraman Nayanar (n.d.). "Paramartham".
- Vengayil Kunhiraman Nayanar (1908). "Kathayonnumalla". Mithavadi.

Essays on literature

- Vengayil Kunhiraman Nayanar (1891). "Akhyayika Allenkil Novel". Vidya Vinodini. Vol. 2, no. 4.
- Vengayil Kunhiraman Nayanar (1891). "Natakam". Vidya Vinodini. Vol. 2, no. 9.
- Vengayil Kunhiraman Nayanar (1892). "Swabhasha". Vidya Vinodini. Vol. 3, no. 8.
- Vengayil Kunhiraman Nayanar (1892). "Bhramam". Vidya Vinodini. Vol. 3, no. 8.
- Vengayil Kunhiraman Nayanar (1892). "Mahakavikalude Jeevakalam". Vidya Vinodini. Vol. 3, no. 9.
- Vengayil Kunhiraman Nayanar (1893). "Mahakavyam". Vidya Vinodini. Vol. 3, no. 12.
- Vengayil Kunhiraman Nayanar (1893). "Gadyakavyam". Vidya Vinodini. Vol. 4, no. 1.
- Vengayil Kunhiraman Nayanar (1893). "Pouranikakalathe Parishkarasthithi". Vidya Vinodini. Vol. 4, no. 2.
- Vengayil Kunhiraman Nayanar (n.d.). "Novel". Vidya Vinodini.

Essays on culture

- Vengayil Kunhiraman Nayanar (1898). "Nammude Chila Pracheena Acharopacharangalum Sthanamanangalum Mattum Mattum". Vidya Vinodini. Vol. 9, no. 11.
- Vengayil Kunhiraman Nayanar (n.d.). "Achara Parishkaram". Vidya Vinodini.

Essays on agriculture

- Vengayil Kunhiraman Nayanar (1894). "Krishi Parishkaram I". Vidya Vinodini. Vol. 6, no. 1.
- Vengayil Kunhiraman Nayanar (1894). "Krishi Parishkaram I". Vidya Vinodini. Vol. 6, no. 2.
- Vengayil Kunhiraman Nayanar (1898). "Krishisambandhamaya Chila Aithihyangal". Vidya Vinodini. Vol. 9, no. 11.
- Vengayil Kunhiraman Nayanar (1913). "Kerala Janmisabha". Bhashaposhini. Vol. 17, no. 9–10.

Miscellaneous

- Vengayil Kunhiraman Nayanar (1893). "Vaidyam". Vidya Vinodini. Vol. 4, no. 6.
- Vengayil Kunhiraman Nayanar (1893). "Marichalathe Sukham". Vidya Vinodini. Vol. 4, no. 7.
- Vengayil Kunhiraman Nayanar (1893). "Kapadavedanthikal". Kerala Pathrika.
- Vengayil Kunhiraman Nayanar (1894). "Sheettukali". Vidya Vinodini. Vol. 5, no. 1.
- Vengayil Kunhiraman Nayanar (1914). "Vidyarthikalum Mathrubhashayum" (PDF). Bhashaposhini.
- Vengayil Kunhiraman Nayanar (1909). Introduction. In: Kottarathil Sankunni. Aithihyamala Part 1.
- Vengayil Kunhiraman Nayanar (1914). Introduction. In: Kottarathil Sankunni. Aithihyamala Part 2.

== See also ==
- "Kesari" A. Balakrishna Pillai was a critic who was also known by the pseudonym "Kesari".
- Madayi Kavu
- Malayalam
