= Atmopadesa Śatakam =

1897 Malayalam spiritual work by Narayana Guru

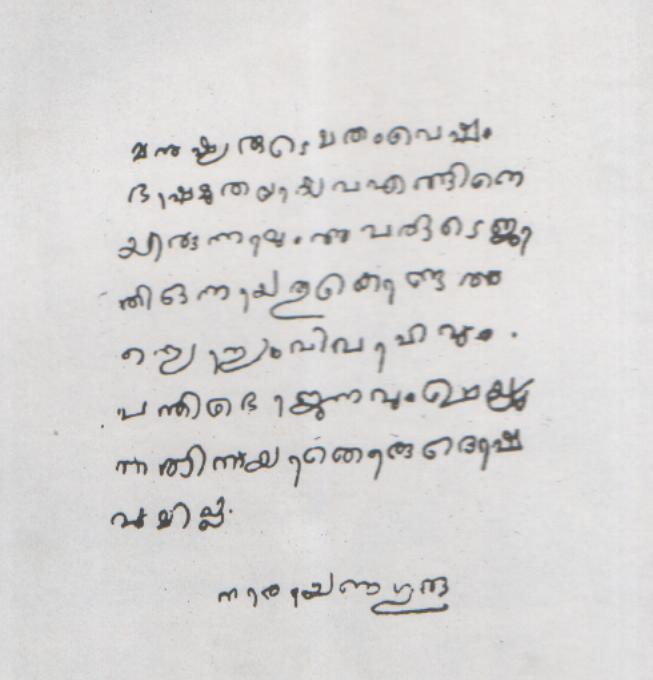
Handwriting of Narayana Guru

Ātmopadesa Śatakam is a Malayalam spiritual work by Narayana Guru in the form of a poem. It is considered as the classic work of Narayana Guru, who was a social reformer and spiritual leader of Kerala, India. The literal translation of the title means "One Hundred Verses of Self Instruction". "Atmopadesa Śatakam" contained 100 verses or stanzas, each describing a set of actions performed by the self on itself, affecting and recognising moments of transformation into an absolute value.

Narayana's principal disciple, Nataraja Guru, translated this work into English, titled as "Centiloquy of the self". Nitya Chaitanya Yati, famous disciple of Nataraja Guru, also made a commentary on it as "That Alone, the Core of Wisdom: A Commentary on Atmopadesa Śatakam, the One Hundred Verses of Self-Instruction of Narayana Guru". Nithya Chaithanya Yathis says: "With this verse you are entering into an intense spiritual discipline. There is no need to learn each verse and then rationally apply it in everyday life. You can even hear it and forget it. Forgetting means it only goes deeper into you. Once you have heard it, it will go and work its way by itself. The effect will be very subtle. It comes almost without you knowing that it is something which you heard that is enabling you to see things in a new light or make resolutions in a more helpful way."

"Atmopadesa Śatakam" was initially published as "Atmabodham" and is believed to have reached its present form by 1897. This work is presented before a group of people at Aruvippuram, as a practice text written into form of advice who followed Narayana Guru. Though he wrote in Sanskrit and Tamil, this work is in Malayalam. Most of his earlier works contained adoration of Hindu deities with an underlying context of Advaitha Vedantha. But in this work, he directly describes the ways of attaining self-realisation with a philosophical context and stresses seeking the absolute value called "Self" or "the Atman" and not any God to adore as hitherto.
