= Sree Sundareswara Temple =

Hindu temple in Kerala, India

- Location in Kerala Sree Sundareswara Temple (India)

Religion
- Affiliation: Hinduism
- District: Kannur
- Deity: Lord Shiva
- Festival: Pooyam Star in Meenam

Location
- Location: Kannur
- State: Kerala
- Country: India
- Interactive map of Sree Sundareswara Temple
- Coordinates: 11°44′46″N 75°29′31″E

Architecture
- Type: Kerala
- Creator: Sree Narayana Gurudevan
- Established: 1908
- Completed: 1916

Website
- http://sreesundareswara.com

The Sree Sundareswara Temple is one of two prominent temples consecrated by Sree Narayana Guru Devan in Kannur District, the other being Sree Jagannaatha Temple, Thalassery. The temple is located in suburban Talap in the Kannur district of Kerala, India, which is approximately 2 km away from Kannur Railway Station, and 3 km from Kannur New Bus Stand, Thavakkara. The temple has Shiva, in the form of Sundareswara, as its main deity.

== History ==
By the 19th century the members of the Thiyya community in Malabar had been far removed from their older spiritual practices originally based on ancient Buddhist traditions, and were indulging in worship of prakritik deities and tamasic practices like animal sacrifice. However, during the last part of British Raj, community members started gaining modern education, especially with the help of missionary run educational Institutions, resulting in a partial move away from tamasic spiritual practices.

One community member, Varathoor Kaniyil Kunhi Kannan, heard many stories regarding the spiritual activities of Guru Devan and decided to meet with him. After multiple days, he managed to travel to a house in "Anju Thengu" where Guru Devan was staying. The next day he was able to have a discussion with Guru Devan at Shivagiri. He asked Guru Devan to consecrate a temple in Malabar, like those he had done in South Kerala, for the spiritual uplifting of the Thiyya community in Kannur. Guru Devan asked him why such a temple was required, pointing out that a lot of community members were highly educated, socially prominent, and active in Arya Samaj and Vedanta Societies. Kannan convinced Guru Devan that, despite these, a large percentage of the population was still following tamasic rites. Finally, Guru Devan agreed to visit Kannur in the near future.

Kannan returned to Kannur and started working towards the goal of a new temple with other prominent community members like Madhavan Master, Choyi Butler, Manikkoth Govindan Bhagavathar, Karyan Govindan Gurukkal, Chamakkali Kannan, Poovadan Krishnan, Chandroth Ananthan Mesthri, and Oyatti Krishnan Vakil. They created an executive committee with Choyi Butler as President and Chamakkali Kannan as Secretary.

True to his promise, Guru Devan visited Kannur in 1907 and stayed at the home of Kottiyath Choyi. The matter of temple building was discussed again, and before Guru Devan left a committee was formed with Cheruvari Karunakaran Tahasildar as president and Chamakkali Kannan as secretary. In a meeting held on 16 February 1908, Sree Bhagaval Bhakti Pradeepa Yogam was formally established. This organization was renamed as Sree Bhakti Samvardhinini Yogam in 1913. In 1908, Guru Devan again visited Kannur on the invitation of Chamakkali Kannan and Kombra Kannan Master.

On his visit to see the proposed sites for the temple, Guru Devan approved of a proposed site in Talap. Later, during construction, remnants of an ancient temple was unearthed from this site. Despite financial problems, the temple was constructed and consecrated by Sree Narayana Guru Devan at a muhoortham between 3 AM and 3:20 AM on 11 April 1916, during the ascendancy of Pooyam (Pushya) star.

Subsequently, Guru Devan's statue was consecrated in 1938 along with the Dwajastambam (flag pole) and Deepastambam (lamp post). The Balikkappura (bali platform) was consecrated in 1939, Gajamandapam (elephant hall) in 1943 and the temple pond in 1946.

== Festival ==
The temple's main annual festival celebration of Arattu spans eight days and is held in the Malayalam month Meenam, starting from Pooyam Nakshatram. An Arattu procession begins from the temple at 4 PM on the last day of the festival, and Arattu is conducted at Payyambalam Beach. The government declares an official leave from 4 PM onward on this day.
