= Ezhava Siva =

Shiva idol consecrated by Sree Narayana Guru in 1888 at Aruvippuram

Ezhava is a community found in Kerala. Shiva is a Hindu god. Siva idol was consecrated by social reformer Sree Narayana Guru at Aruvippuram, in 1888.The term "Ezhava Siva" refers to a tongue-in-cheek reply given by Sree Narayana Guru when questioned by a group of Brahmins about the legitimacy of a non Brahmin consecrating a temple.

== Overview ==
Sree Narayana Guru, well learned in the Hindu scriptures, always considered God as a power without limits and boundaries but who bestows benevolence on all, irrespective of caste. This is evident in the Universal Prayer in Malayalam, Daiva Daśakam (10 Verses To God) he had written for the masses. After the Aruvippuram Temple Consecration, he wrote in Malayalam:

Jaathibhedam Mathadwesham

Eathumillathey Sarvarum
Sodarathwena Vaazhunna

Mathrukasthanamanithu
("this is the model abode where everyone will live in brotherhood, without animosity due to differences of caste and religion")

Sree Narayana Guru belonged to Ezhava community, which is considered as a backward caste. The sarcasm was meant to highlight the immorality of Brahmins who denied social spaces and the right to worship for those belonging to backward communities.

== Consecration ==
During Sree Narayana Guru's wandering life he came upon Aruvippuram in 1888. He decided to build a place of worship open to all castes. He picked up a stone from near by Neyyar river and used it as an idol for the proposed temple and consecrated it.

This act challenged Brahmin hegemony. When Brahmin priests questioned his right to do so, he replied famously that what he installed was an "Ezhava Siva". He further asked whether the universal power belonged to any caste. He set up other temples at Aluva, Vypin, Cherai and Moothakunnam.

== Legacy ==
Narayana Guru's actions are widely acknowledged to have paved way for later movements by lower castes for temple entry, including the ‘Vaikom Satyagraha’. 125th Anniversary of Aruvippuram installation was celebrated in 2013.

== See also ==
- Narayana Guru
