= R. Sugathan =

Indian politician

Member of Travancore-Cochin Assembly
- In office 1952–1954
- Constituency: Alleppey
- In office 1954–1956
- Constituency: Mararikulam

Kerala Legislative Assembly
- In office 1957–1959
- In office 1960–1964
- Constituency: Karthikappally

Personal details
- Born: 23 December 1901 Aalissery, Alappuzha, Travancore
- Died: 14 February 1970 (aged 68) Kerala
- Party: Communist Party of India (CPI)
- Occupation: teacher, trade unionist, politician

R. Sugathan, (23 December 1901 – 14 February 1970), popularly known as Sugathansir, was an Indian Communist leader and an early trade unionist of Kerala. He was elected to the Travancore-Cochin Assembly in 1952 (Alleppey) & 1954 from Maraikkulam (Mararikulam), followed by first Kerala Legislative Assembly elections in 1957 from Karthigapally (Karthikappally) in present Alappuzha district, and second assembly also from Karthikappally as a CPI member.

== Early life and education ==
Born R. Shreedharan in Kerala. After passing his Malayalam Middle school he came under influence of Buddhist doctrine and soon changed his name to R. Sugathan.

== Career ==
He was an active member of the Sahodara Sangham (The Brotherhood Movement), later he left his teaching job at a private school to join SNDP, where he worked hard to eliminate caste as an institution, and also SNDP's political wing, Ezhava Political League, and when Congress came into existence in the state he became its part. In 1938, he organized coir factory workers into union and was arrested for agitating, and sentenced to two years rigorous imprisonment.

Later, he became involved with the Travancore Labour Association and finally he left Congress joined the Communist Party in 1942, he was imprisoned twice again in the following years.

== Legacy ==
In 2008, his death anniversary on 14 February was observed as 'flag day' by Communist Party of India (CPI) at its State conference at Thiruvananthapuram
