= Alwaye Advaita Ashram =

Hindu spiritual school

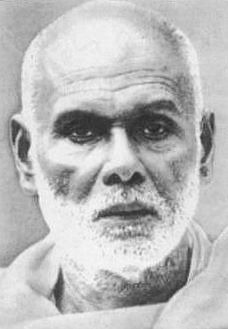
Narayana Guru

Advaita Ashram - the ashrams in Aluva, founded in 1913 by Narayana Guru at Aluva, Kerala. Here he established a Sanskrit school to restore the sanctity of the language through which universal spiritual teachings can be grasped and imparted to dedicated disciples.

In 1923, Narayana Guru organized an All Religion Conference, held at the Ashram. In March 1925, Mahatma Gandhi visited the Ashram but Narayana Guru was not present there.

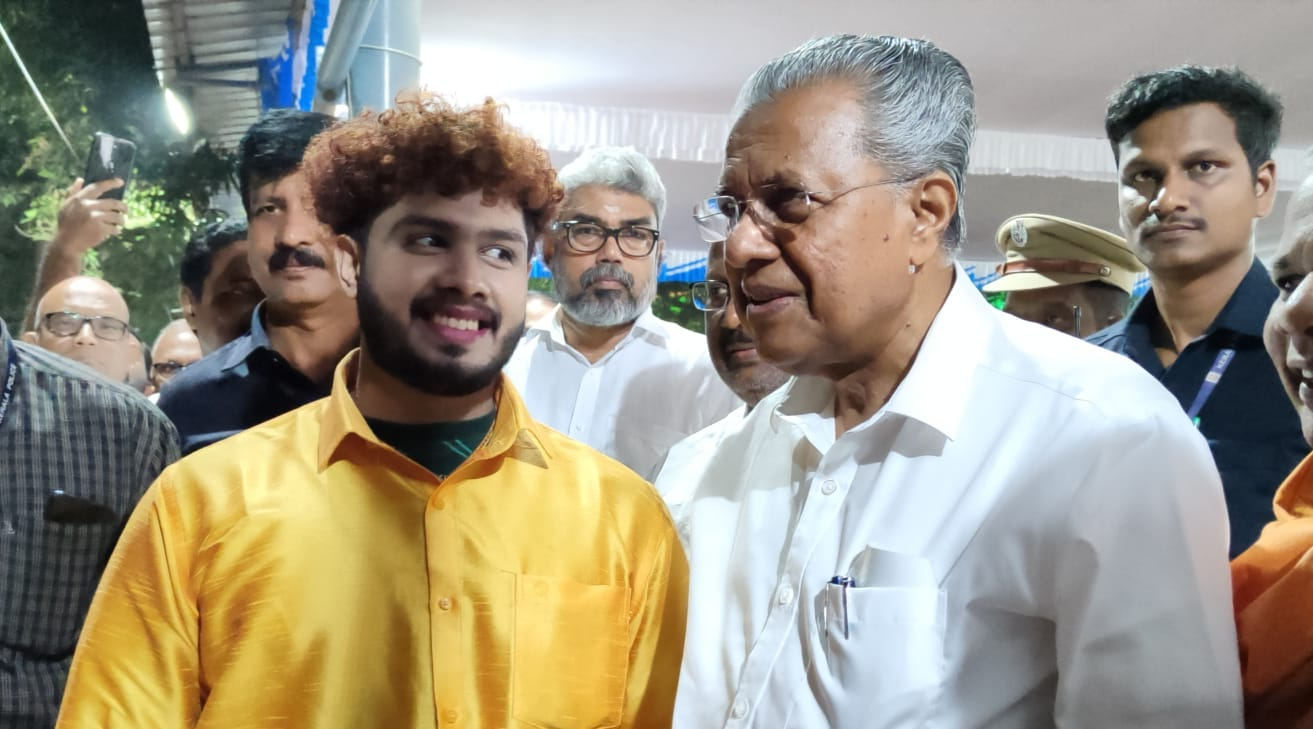
Musician S Navaneeth Krishna (He performed as a part of the event.) with Chief Minister of Kerala, Pinarayi Vijayan (He inaugurated the event.), at the 100th anniversary of the All Religion Conference (Sarva Matha Sammelanam), Alwaye Advaita Ashram.

== See also ==
- Narayana Guru
- Sree Narayana Dharma Paripalana Yogam (SNDP)
- Sree Narayana Trust
- Sivagiri, Kerala
