= Jnana Vigraham =

Representation of reformer Narayana Guru

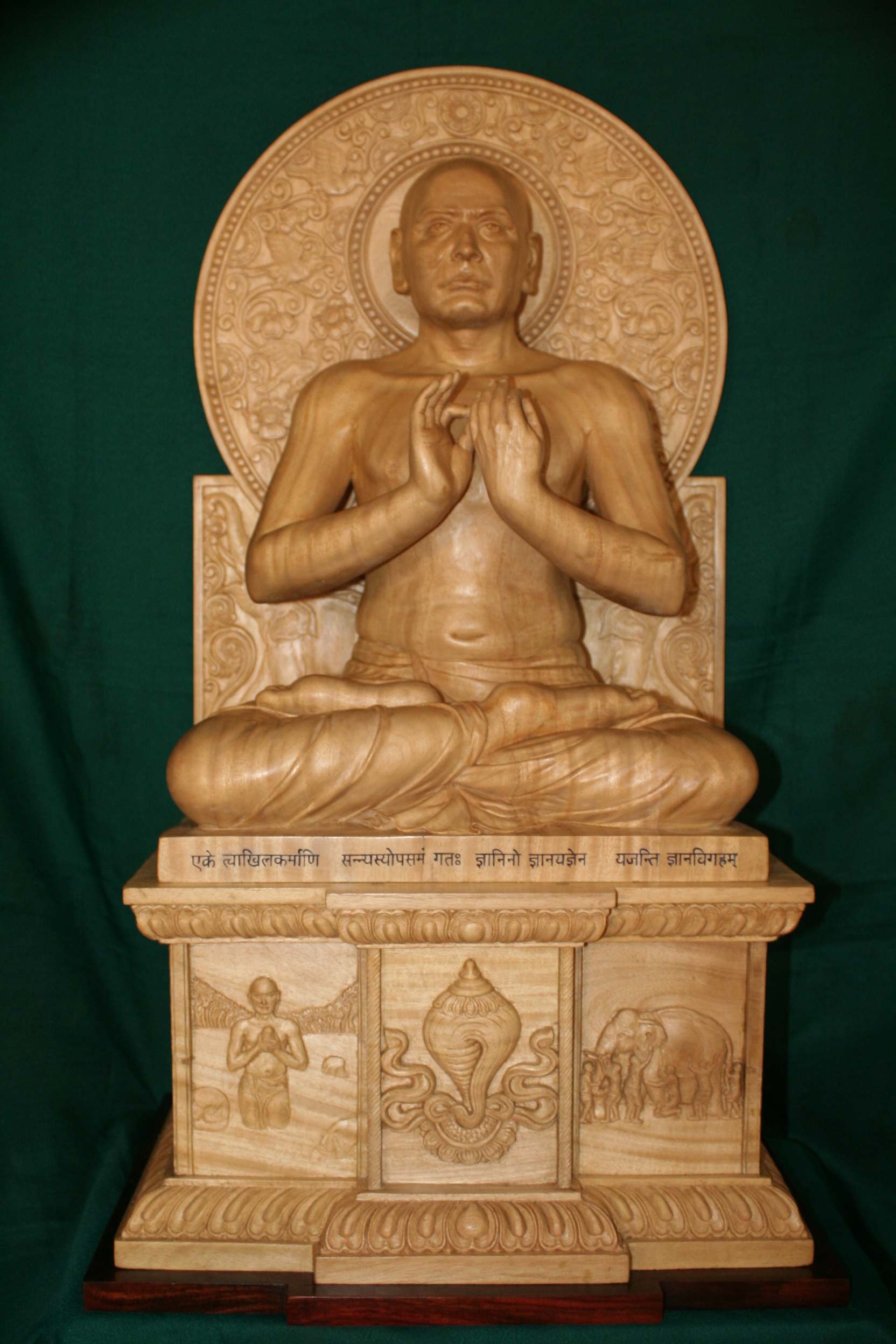
The first Jnana Vigraham of Narayana Guru

Jñāna Vigraham is a distinctively styled statue of the Hindu social reformer Narayana Guru. In Sanskrit, the word Jñāna means knowledge, and Vigraham is the common term for statue (or embodiment). The name Jñāna Vigraham signifies embodiment of knowledge. The first such statue was carved in wood and portrays a facial likeness to Narayana Guru.

The overall iconography incorporates aesthetic design elements, Sanskrit words of reverence, and symbolic depiction of Guru's spiritual reform initiative, concepts of human equality and knowledge (arivu). The aesthetic elements of the design of a Jñāna Vigraham conform to ancient eastern philosophic and religious iconography and carvings commonly seen across Hinduism, Buddhism, and Jainism.

== The first Jñāna Vigraham ==
The first Jñāna Vigraham was designed and commissioned by a private art collector and researcher of Narayana Guru's philosophy and teachings. It was primarily intended as a trendsetter to improve the quality of Narayana Guru's statues, kept in homes and in small chapel-like places of reverence and worship called 'Guru Mandirams'. These shrines dot the length and breadth of Kerala, the south-western part of India where Narayana Guru was born and lived during the period 1856 to 1928.

The Jñāna Vigraham was sculptured in wood by the sculptor Artist Mani Mesthiri of Thiruvananthapuram, Kerala, during 2006-2007. The work signified the period commemorating one and a half centuries since Guru's birth, as well as the 75th anniversary of the annual pilgrimage to Sivagiri, the resting place of Narayana Guru.

== Design elements ==
The design of Jñāna Vigraham incorporates three parts of its structure - the anatomical statue, the pedestal, and the radiance board (Prabha).

=== The anatomical statue ===
The core anatomical statue is devoid of any decorative elements. It is a lifelike figure of Narayana Guru, supposedly in his mid-life, in a seated posture and with hands in the ‘dharmachakra mudra’, the gesture of teaching usually interpreted as turning the wheel of righteousness. The hands are held level with the heart, the thumbs and index fingers form circles, symbolising the teachings of the Narayana Guru. The legs are placed in ‘vajrāsana’ an iconographic yoga posture (also referred to as ‘padmasana’), symbolising that Narayana Guru had mastered various yoga practices and endorsed Raja Yoga, which is yoga of meditation and also incorporates Hatha Yoga.

=== The pedestal ===
The pedestal has three front-facing panels with relief carvings. The centre panel depicts the conch and lotus, the traditional eastern symbol of dharma. One of the side panels illustrate the historic consecration of the lingam in 1888 at Aruvippuram; an action of Narayana Guru that broke the misconception that such spiritual practices was reserved as a prerogative of orthodox priests of those days, simply being misinterpreted and claimed by them during the british rule, when foreign rule was supported by them, and inturn received land and patronage in the form of jobs, position etc. The third panel depicts the eastern proverbial blind men and an elephant as represented by Narayana Guru in verse 44 of the guru's philosophical magnum opus and scripture Atmopadesa Satakam (one hundred verses of self-instruction).

=== The radiance board ===
The radiance board providing the backdrop and halo for the statue incorporates decorative elements and symbolism. The overall structure of the backdrop displays likeness to the Sarnath Buddha. The lower portion of the board figures the relief carvings of two elephants in outward facing and welcoming posture signifying Narayana Guru's openness to the views and beliefs of other religions and philosophies. The radiance board also has relief carvings of fluttering birds representing the guru's words in verse 8 of the scripture Atmopadesa Satakam. The six fluttering birds represent the five senses and the sixth sense of philosophical intuition as visualised by the designers to venerate the guru. The relief carvings of the birds are intertwined with creepers and flowers signifying the growth and fruition of wisdom.

=== Words of reverence ===
The Jñāna Vigraham incorporates the citation of a Sanskrit verse from the ancient Indian scripture Bhagavata Purana to revere Narayana Guru as follows:

eke tvākhila-karmāni

sannyasyopaśamaḿ gatāḥ

jñānino jñāna-yajñena

yajanti jñāna-vigraham

Translation: In pursuit of spiritual knowledge, some persons renounce all material activities and, having thus become peaceful, perform the sacrifice of philosophic investigation to worship You, the embodiment of knowledge.
