= Anandasramam, Changanacherry =

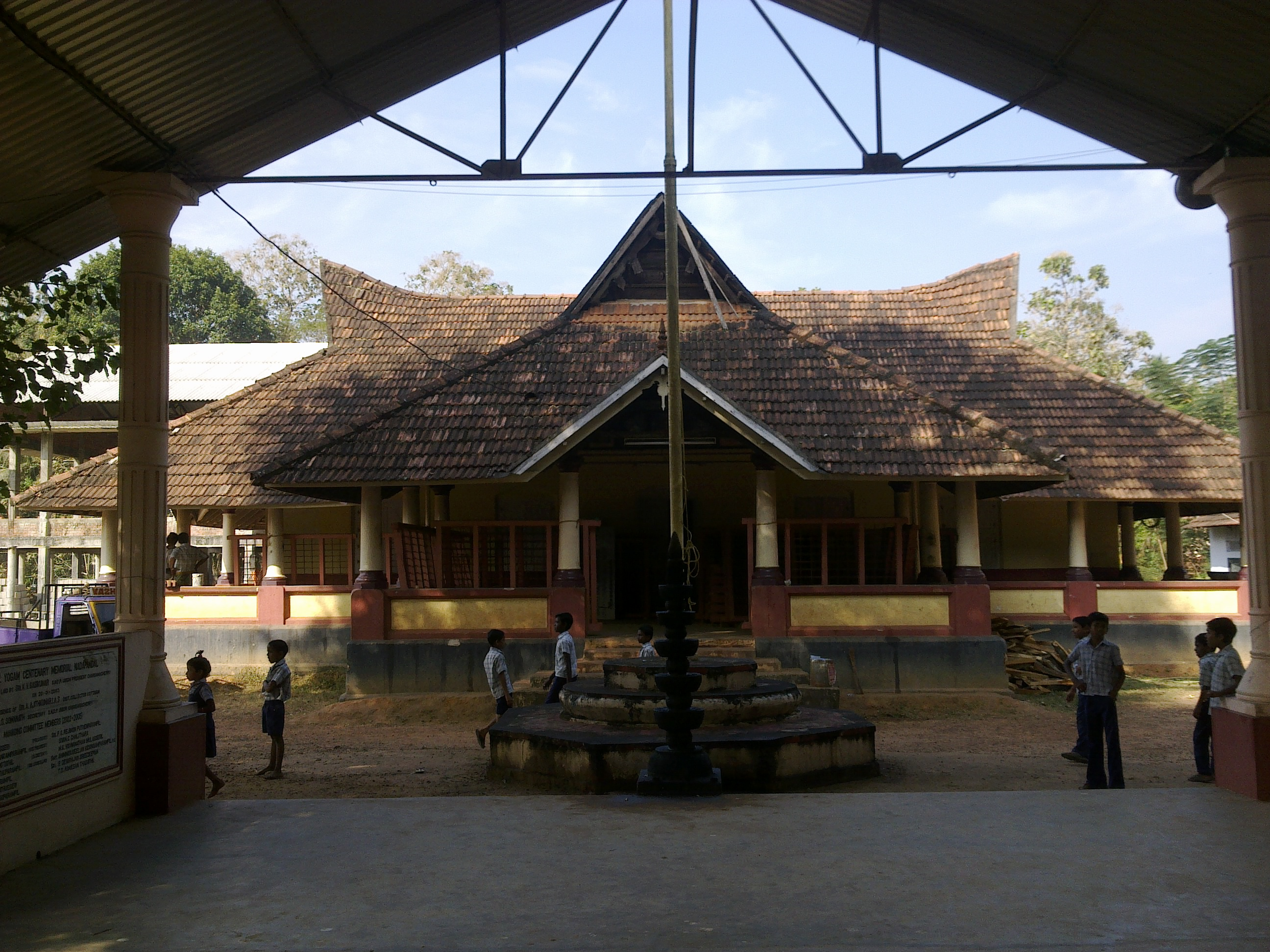

SNDP Yogam Branch No.1A, Anandasramam is located at Vazhappally, in Changanacherry town, Kottayam district. The Asramam was blessed by the footprint of Sree Narayana Guru, a famous saint and social reformer from Kerala. Anandasramam was inaugurated by Mahatma Gandhi. (Kolla Varsham 1109, 6th Makaram, on Friday 10.35 a.m.)

https://web.archive.org/web/20131104201759/http://www.anandasramam.in/history/%23
