= Nitya Chaitanya Yati =

Indian yogi and writer (1924–1999)

Personal life
- Born: K. R. Jayachandra Panicker; 2 November 1924 Mlanthadom Murinjakal, Travancore present day Pathanamthitta district, Kerala, India
- Died: 14 May 1999 (aged 74) Ooty, Tamil Nadu, India
- Notable works: That Alone, the Core of Wisdom; Love and Blessings; In the Stream of Consciousness; Living the Science of Harmonious Union; Beyond the door that is Death
- Relatives: Raghava Panicker (father); Vamakshi Amma (mother); Muloor S. Padmanabha Panicker (uncle)

Religious life
- Religion: Hinduism
- Philosophy: Vedanta

Religious career
- Teacher: Nataraja Guru
- Awards: Kerala Sahitya Akademi Award for Literary Criticism

Nitya Chaitanya Yati (2 November 1924 – 14 May 1999) was an Indian philosopher, psychologist, author and poet, best known for his commentaries on Advaita Vedanta as well as his literary criticisms. He was a disciple of Nataraja Guru, the successor to Narayana Guru. Yati published over 140 books in English and Malayalam including a commentary on Darsana Mala of Narayana Guru, titled, Psychology of Darsana Mala. Kerala Sahitya Akademi honoured him with their annual award for literary criticism in 1977.

== Biography ==
Nitya Chaitanya Yati was born K. R. Jayachandra Panicker on 2 November 1924 at Vakayar, a village in the erstwhile Travancore, now in Pathanamthitta district of the south Indian state of Kerala to Pandalam Raghava Panicker, a poet, teacher, and his wife, Vamakshi Amma and nephew of Muloor S. Padmanabha Panicker. After early education by a local teacher by name, Nanu Pillai, he studied at Kulathingal High School from where he passed the SSLC examination. Subsequently, he left home and traveled for the next eight years during which period he learnt Buddhism, Jainism and Sufism and met such people as Mahatma Gandhi and Ramana Maharshi. On his return from his wanderings, he joined Union Christian College, Aluva and earned his graduate degree in philosophy before securing a master's degree in philosophy from the University College, Thiruvananthapuram in 1952.

Yati was influenced by Ramana Maharshi after his meeting with the spiritual leader and he took up sanyasa in 1951. After serving as a faculty at the Sree Narayana College, Kollam for a while, he moved to Mumbai to research on the physically challenged until his move to Chennai to teach at Ramakrishna Mission Vivekananda College in 1953. He stayed in Chennai till 1955 and returned to Mumbai for further research work before moving to New Delhi in 1963 to join the Institute of Psychiatric and Spiritual Research as its director. Later, he succeeded Nataraja Guru as head of the Narayana Gurukulam, a worldwide contemplative community, after a long apprenticeship. In between, he was also associated with the Indian Council of Medical Research as the head of the division of Yoga and with the East West University, of which he was the founder chairperson.

Nitya Chaitanya Yati died on 14 May 1999, at Fernhill Gurukula of Narayana Gurukula, near Ooty, at the age of 74.

== Legacy ==
Nitya Chaitanya Yati authored over 140 books of which 120 are in Malayalam and the rest in English, covering such topics as philosophy, psychology, social ethics and aesthetics and was involved with the World Government of World Citizens as a committed sponsor. Nalini Enna Kavyashilpam (Nalini, a poetic sculpture), his critical study of the Kumaran Asan's poem, Nalini, fetched him the Kerala Sahitya Akademi Award for Literary Criticism in 1977. He wrote two more critiques on Asan's works, Chinthavistayaaya Seetha, Oru Padanam and Duravastha, Oru Padanam. He published a book on Narayana Guru, with the same name, and commentaries on Guru's Darsanamala and Atmopadeshashathakam. He also translated Brhadaranyaka Upanisad into English, which has the original text in transliteration as well as English translation and published critiques on the Bhagavat Gita, Saundaryalahari of Sankaracharya and Marxism. Wandering by Hermann Hesse was another work translated by Yati which was published under the title, Deshadanam. His autobiography, Love and Blessings, is a detailed narrative of his life and includes anecdotes and his letters.

== Selected bibliography ==
=== Works in Malayalam ===
- Nityacaitanya Yati (1976). Chinthavistayaya Sita. Gurukula Publishing House.
- Nityacaitanya Yati (1984). Yaticharitaṃ (in Malayalam). Nārāyaṇa Gurukulaṃ.
- Nityacaitanya Yati (1988). Mar̲akkānāvāttavar. DC Books. ISBN 978-81-7130-005-1.
- Nityacaitanya Yati (1986). Rōgaṃ Bādhicha Vaidyaraṅgaṃ. Nārāyaṇa Gurukuḷam.
- Nityacaitanya Yati (1992). Bhagavadgītāsvāddhyāyaṃ. DC Books. ISBN 978-81-7130-225-3.
- Nityacaitanya Yati (1993). Jeevithathile Vasanthaaraamam. DC Books. ISBN 978-81-7130-280-2.
- Nityacaitanya Yati (1994). Pr̲ēmavuṃ Bhaktiyuṃ: Jayadēvant̲e Gītagōvindaṃ Aspadamakkiyuḷḷa Padanaṃ. Current Books. ISBN 9788124001073.
- Nityacaitanya Yati (2000). Oru Vimōchana Sāmūhyaśāstr̲aṃ. Nārāyaṇa Gurukuḷam.
- Nityacaitanya Yati (2000). Saundaryaṃ, Anubhavaṃ, Anubhooti. Muḷberry Publishers. ISBN 9788124008713.
- Nityacaitanya Yati (2002). Snēhasparśhaṃ. Muḷberry Publishers. ISBN 978-81-240-1176-8.
- Nitya Chaitanya Yati (2013). Nalini Enna Kavya Shilpam (in Malayalam). Lipi Publications. ISBN 978-8188012725.
- Hermann Hesse; Nitya Chaitanya Yati (translator) (2014). Desadanam. Green Books. Archived from the original on 3 April 2019.

=== Works in English ===
- Nityacaitanya Yati (1974). Meditations on the Self. Narayana Gurukula.
- Nityacaitanya Yati (1976). An Intelligent Man's Guide to the Hindu Religion. Narayana Gurukula Foundation.
- In the Stream of Consciousness, East-West University (1976)
- Nityacaitanya Yati (1980). Marxism and Humanist Nonarchy. East-West University of Brahmavidya.
- Nityacaitanya Yati (1981). The Bhagavad Gita: A Sublime Hymn of Yoga Composed by the Ancient Seer Vy錫sa. Vikas. ISBN 978-0-7069-1129-9.
- Nityacaitanya Yati (1981). Meditations on the way: a contemplative and personalized study of the Tao teh ching. Narayana Gurukula.
- Nityacaitanya Yati; Yati Nitya Chaitanya (1984). Sri Narayana Guru: A Brief Biographical Sketch. East-West University of Brahmavidya.
- Nitya C. Yati; Nityacaitanya Yati (1995). Love and Devotion. D. K. Print World (P) Limited. ISBN 978-81-246-0058-0.
- Nityacaitanya Yati (1995). Neither this Nor that But ... Aum: One Hundred Meditations Based on Narayana Guru's Ātmōpadeśa Śatakam. D.K. Printworld.
- Nityacaitanya Yati (1 December 2000). Brhadaranyaka Upanisad: with Original Text in Roman Transliteration, English Translation and Appendices. D.K. Printworld. ISBN 978-81-246-0008-5.
- Nityacaitanya Yati (2000). Love and Blessings: The Autobiography of Guru Nitya Chaitanya Yati. Narayana Gurukala. ISBN 978-0-9706549-0-8.
- Nityacaitanya Yati (2003). That Alone, the Core of Wisdom: A Commentary on Ātmopadeśa Śatakam, the One Hundred Verses of Self-instruction of Narayana Guru. D.K. Printworld. ISBN 978-81-246-0240-9.
- Psychology of Darsana Mala, DK Print World (2004) ISBN 81-246-0254-9
- Nityacaitanya Yati (2005). Narayana Guru. Indian Council of Philosophical Research. ISBN 978-81-85636-89-4.
- Living the Science of Harmonious Union (Patanjali’s Yoga Shastra), DK Print World (2009) ISBN 81-246-0494-0
- That Alone, the Core of Wisdom, DK Print World (2013) ISBN 81-246-0240-9
- Nityacaitanya Yati (2015). The Saundaryalaharī of Śaṅkarācārya: A Translation and Commentary on the Ānandalaharī. D.K. Printworld. ISBN 978-81-246-0810-4.

== See also ==
- Muloor S.Padmanabha Panicker
- H.H. Guru Dileepji Maharaj
- List of Malayalam-language authors
