= Vellappally Natesan =

Indian community leader and politician

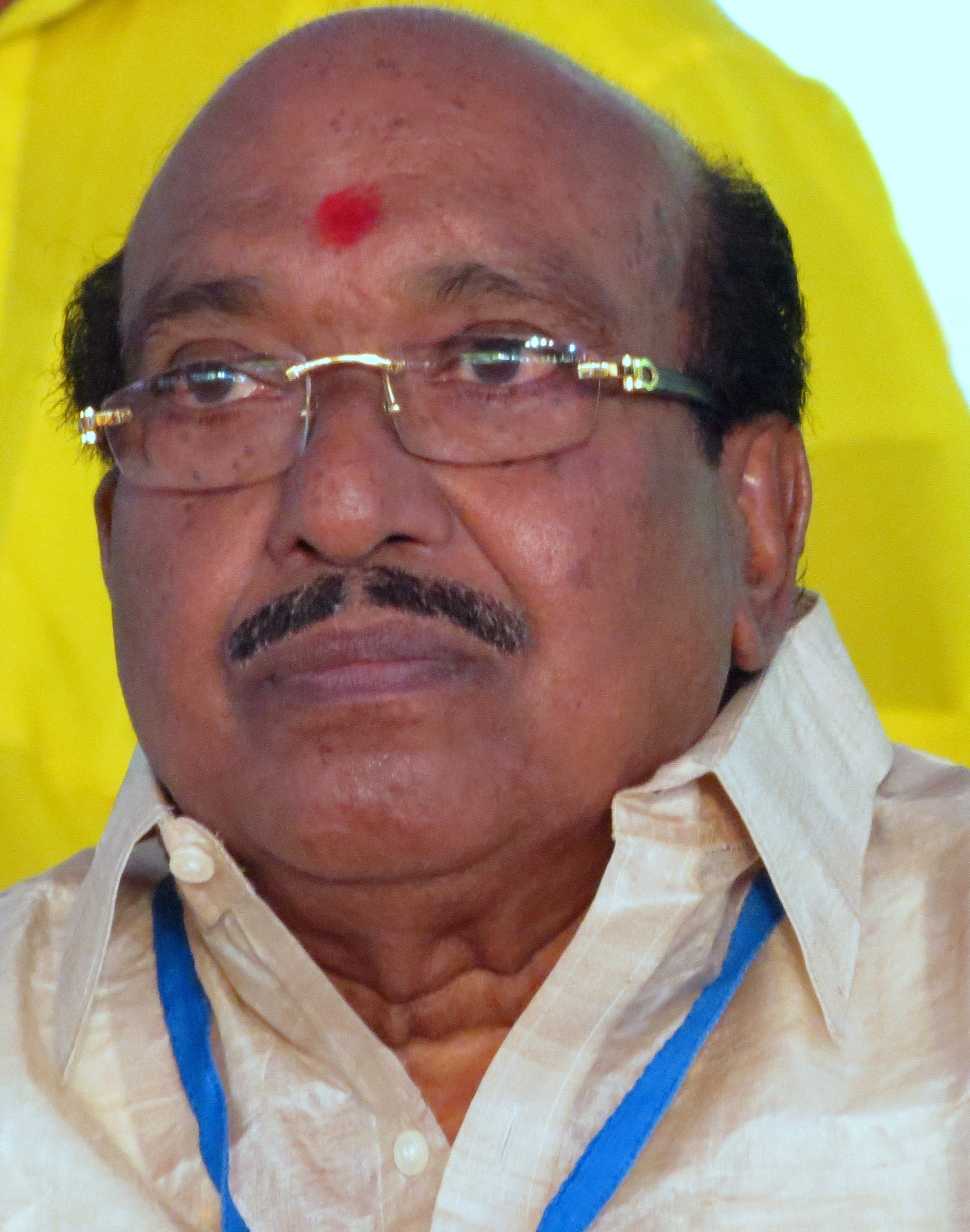
- Vellappally Natesan in 2019

Former General Secretary of SNDP Yogam
- Incumbent
- Assumed office 1996
- Preceded by: R. Sankar

President of Bharath Dharma Jana Sena
- Incumbent
- Assumed office 2015
- Preceded by: Office established

Personal details
- Born: June 11, 1936 (age 89) Alappuzha district, Travancore, British India
- Party: Bharath Dharma Jana Sena
- Spouse: Preethi Natesan
- Children: Tushar Vellappally
- Profession: Businessman, Social leader

Vellappally Natesan is the Former General Secretary of SNDP Yogam and SN Trust. He is a leader of Ezhava community in Kerala. He has been elected as the chief executive of the SNDP meeting for three consecutive times.

He was awarded the Padma Bhushan in 2026 for his contributions to social service.

== Early life ==
He was born on 10 September 1937, at Kanichukulangara in Alappuzha district. His parents are Vellapally Keshavan Muthalali and Devaki Amma. Natesan is the seventh of their twelve children. Preethi is his wife. His son Thushar Vellappaly is the president of BDJS, a political party in Kerala.

== Controversies ==
- In early April 2025, SNDP Yogam general secretary Vellappally Natesan triggered a major controversy after stating during a public speech that Malappuram was “another region” or like a “different country,” a remark that quickly drew widespread criticism. The statement was perceived as offensive and discriminatory toward the Muslim-majority district and led to strong reactions from political parties, including the Indian Union Muslim League (IUML), which accused him of promoting communal division and misrepresenting the social reality of Malappuram. Protests, public condemnations, and formal complaints followed, while the remarks sparked intense debate across Kerala on communal harmony, responsible speech by public leaders, and the impact of such statements on the state’s secular fabric.
- A major suicide-related controversy involving Vellappally Natesan arose following the death of K K Mahesan, a senior SNDP Yogam leader, who was found dead at the Kanichukulangara union office in Alappuzha in June 2020. Mahesan’s family alleged that he was subjected to severe mental harassment and pressure over alleged financial issues within the organisation, and later approached the court seeking justice. In a significant development, an Alappuzha magistrate court directed police to register a case naming Vellappally Natesan as the first accused, along with others, under charges including abetment of suicide. While Vellappally denied all allegations and termed them baseless, the case sparked intense political and public debate in Kerala over leadership accountability, organisational pressure, and mental health.
- In early January 2026, SNDP Yogam general secretary Vellappally Natesan once again came into the political spotlight following his strong remarks on Kerala’s evolving political landscape. He openly criticised certain political parties, including the Indian Union Muslim League, alleging misuse of political influence and marginalisation of backward communities, while also expressing confidence that the Left Democratic Front would retain power in the upcoming Assembly elections. His statements triggered sharp reactions from opposition leaders and even drew criticism from sections within the ruling front, reigniting debate over his growing political interventions and the role of community leaders in active state politics.
- In early January 2026, veteran social leader and SNDP Yogam general secretary Vellappally Natesan sparked a fresh controversy when he described a television journalist as an “extremist” during a press conference in Alappuzha, after the reporter questioned him about his earlier comments on Malappuram district and related political issues. According to reports, Natesan reacted angrily to the questioning, pushed aside the journalist’s microphone and later, at a public event, labelled the reporter an extremist and claimed the journalist had been sent with an agenda to portray him as “anti-religious,” alleging links with a Muslim student organisation. The Kerala Union of Working Journalists (KUWJ) condemned his remarks as “unacceptable” in a democratic society, stressing that journalists raise questions on behalf of the public and that leaders must show restraint; the union warned that such behaviour could harm press freedom and social atmosphere in the state.

== Awards ==
He was awarded the Padma Bhushan in 2026 for his contributions to social service.
