= Nataraja Guru =

Disciple of Narayana Guru

- Born: P. Natarajan; 18 February 1895; Bangalore, India
- Died: 19 March 1973 (aged 78)
- Occupation: Founder of Narayana Gurukula
- Website: natarajaguru.org

Nataraja Guru (born P. Natarajan, 18 February 1895 – 19 March 1973) was a disciple of Narayana Guru. Nataraja Guru founded Narayana Gurukula in 1923 for the integral study of various wisdom approaches.

== Biography ==
Nataraja Guru was born in Bangalore in British India on 18 February 1895. His mother was Bhagavathi Amma and his father, Palpu, was a doctor who founded the Sree Narayana Dharma Paripalana (Society for the Propagation of the Religion of Sree Narayana, or SNDP) in 1903, of which Sree Narayana Guru was the first president. Natarajan was the third of five children, having both an older and younger brother and an older and younger sister. He received a high-class education in Bangalore, Thiruvananthapuram and Kandy before being awarded a master's degree by Madras Presidency College.

Natarajan had come into contact with Narayana Guru and experienced the gurukula way of life in Aluva and Ooty before becoming headmaster at Varkala High School, which had been founded by Naryana. It was after a "conference of all religions" at Alwaye that Natarajan founded his Narayana Gurukulam Movement (NGM) and University for the Science of the Absolute in 1924. K. K. N. Kurup, a historian of Kerala, describes the NGM as "an international order of brotherhood".

In the year that Sree Naryana Guru Great Samadi, 1928, Natarajan received his blessing to study abroad. These studies lasted five years, during which he obtained a doctorate of letters from the Sorbonne in Paris while also teaching at the Quaker International School in Geneva.

On returning to India, Natarajan spent two years seeking work in various parts of the country because the followers of Narayana were not welcoming to him after the guru's death. In 1935, he returned to the gurukul at Fernhill in Ooty. He spent some time as an Advisor for the princely state of Cochin and established an educational institute in Mysore State before leaving India for Europe once again in 1949. Upon his return in 1951, having also visited America, he was recognised as a guru.

Thereafter, Nataraja travelled widely around the world and, in 1963, established the Brahmavidya Mandiram at Sivagiri in Varkala. He translated into English and wrote commentaries on all the major works of Narayana Guru. He also wrote on a wide variety of subjects, employing throughout a protolinguistic or structural approach.

Nataraja Guru Samadi on 19 March 1973 at the NGM headquarters in Varkala.

== Books ==
- The Word of the Guru: Life and Teachings of Narayana Guru (content archived 5 February 2012) first serialized in The Sufi Quarterly, 1928, published as a book at Geneva, 1931.
- Unitive Philosophy, D.K. Printworld (P) Ltd., New Delhi, 2005, ISBN 81-246-0339-1, comprising:
  - Vedanta Revalued and Restated (content archived 4 March 2012), first serialized in Values magazine Nov. 1963 - Nov. 1964.
  - The Philosophy of a Guru, (content archived 9 May 2008) serialized in Values magazine Jan. 1965 - Nov. 1965
  - The Search for a Norm in Western Thought, (content archived 17 October 2007) serialized in Values magazine Jan. 1966 - Nov. 1966
- Autobiography of an Absolutist
- The Bhagavad Gita, Translation and Commentary, (content archived 5 February 2012)
- An Integrated Science of the Absolute (Volumes I, II)
- Wisdom: The Absolute is Adorable
- Saundarya Lahari of Sankara (content archived 4 February 2012)
- Memorandum on World Government
- World Education Manifesto
- Experiencing One World
- Dialectical Methodology
- Anthology of the Poems of Narayana Guru
