= Temples consecrated by Narayana Guru =

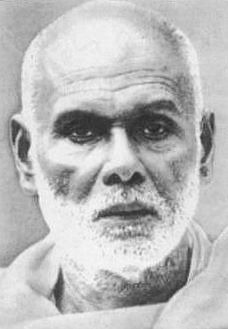
Sri Narayana Guru : Spiritual Guru, One of the greatest Social reformers in India

Narayana Guru built temples at various locations in India: Kollam, Thiruvananthapuram, Thrissur, Kannur, Anchuthengu, Thalassery, Kozhikode, Mangalore. Some of the temples built by the guru are:

- 1888.

Shiva temple established at Aruvippuram, Thiruvananthapuram

- 1889.

Devi Temple dedicated at Mannanthala, Thiruvananthapuram

- 1892.
- 1893 Kolathukara siva Temple, Kulathur, Thiruvananthapuram.

Temple established at AayiramThengu, Alappad, Kollam

- 1893.

Temple established at Poothotta, Ernakulam

- 1893.

Dedicated Sree Subrahmanya Temple (Sree Dharmashastha Temple), Earathu near Kayikkara Thiruvananthapuram

- 1895.

Bhagavathi temple dedicated at Karunagappalli (near Kunnazathu), Kollam

- 1898.

Subrhamaniya temple dedicated at Vazhamuttam, Kunnumpara, Thiruvananthapuram

- 1904.

Sree Narayanapuram krishna Temple, Aashraamam, Kollam

- 1907

The Sree Bhakthi Samvardhini Yogam, Kannur was constituted with the blessings of Sree Narayana Guru

- 1908 February.

Jaganatha Shiva Temple at Thalasserry, Kannur dedicated.

- 1909.

Foundation stone laid for temple at Mangalore

- 1914.

August, Advaitha Ashramam at Aluva started.

- 1914

Ernakulam (Poonurunni-Vytila Road) Sree Narayaneswaram Shiva, Parvati, Vishnu, Ganesha, Kartikeya Temple. The temple was raised at the instance of Sree Narayana Guru.

- 1915.

Dedicated Jnanaswara Shiva temple at Anchuthengu

- 1916.

Sree Maheshwara (Shiva) Temple at Koorkkancheri, Thrissur dedicated.

- 1920

Dedicated the temple at Karamukku, Thrissur.

- 1921.

Dedicated the Sree Kalakandeshwaram (Shiva) Temple, Murukumpuza, Thiruvananthapuram

- 1927.

14 June, Temple dedicated at Kalavamkodam Saktiswaram - Ardhanarishvara (Cherthala Thaluk of Alappuzha District) with a mirror

Some of the other temples built by Sree Narayana Guru are

- Puthiya Kavu Subrahmanya Temple, Vakkom, Thiruvananthapuram
- Vakkom Subrahmanya Temple (Velayudhan Nada), Vakkom, Thiruvananthapuram
- Vakkom Deveshwara Temple, (Vakkom Puthan Nada), Vakkom, Thiruvananthapuram
- Mannanthala Anandavalleshwaram Parvati Devi Temple, Mannanthala, Thiruvananthapuram
- Sreekapaleshwara (Shiva) Temple, Anjuthengu, Thiruvananthapuram
- Poothotta Sree Narayana Vallabha (Shiva) Temple, Kanayanoor, Ernakulam
- Ettanil Shivaparvathy Temple, Thekkumbhagam, Puthiyakavu, Ernakulam
- Vealikkattu Sree Narayanamangalam Kartikeya Temple, Kollam
- Kunninezath Sree Narayana Bhoovaneshwari Temple, Kozhikod, Karunagappalli, Kollam
- Sree Narayanamangalam Temple, Moothakunnam, North Paroor, Ernakulam
- Sree Kumaramangalam Subrahmanya Temple, Kumarakom, Kottayam
- Vezhapra Shaktiparambu Temple, Ramankary, Alappuzha
- Sree Ardhanarishvara Temple, Kumbalangy, Kochi
- Sree Bhavaneeswara Temple (Shiva Temple), Palluruthy, Ernakulam district
- Sree Pillayar Kovil (Temple), Kottar, Nagercoil, Tamil Nadu
- Sree Gowreeshwara (Family Of Lord Shiva)Temple, Cherai, Ernakulam
- Sree Sharada Temple, Sivagiri, Varkala, Thiruvananthapuram
- Sree Anandabhuteshwaram Temple, Mezhuveli, Kozhenchery, Pathanamthitta
- Sree Pottayil Devi Temple, Nadama, Thripunithura, Ernakulam
- Sree Njaneshwara (Shiva) Temple, Puthan Nada, Chirayinkeezhu, Thiruvananthapuram
- Sree Mahadevar Temple, Nagambadam, Kottayam
- Sree Ardhanarishvara Temple, Ootuparambu, Kadakkavoor, Thiruvananthapuram
- Sree Maheshwara Temple, Sreenarayanapuram, Koorkenchery, Thrissur
- Sree Somasekharam Temple, Tannyam, Peringottukara, Thrissur
- Sree Subrahmanya Temple, Nellikkunnu, Kasaragod
- Palakkunnu Sree Bhagavati Temple, Uduma, Kasaragod
- Sree Narayaneshwaram Subrahmanya Temple, Vaikom, Kottayam
- Sree Bhadrachala Subrahmanya Temple, Valappad, Thrissur
- Sree Chidambara Temple, Kandassamkadavu, Thrissur
- Sree Kandeshwaram Sree Mahadeva Temple, Cherthala, Alappuzha
- Sree Kumarapuram Temple, Mangad, Kollam
- Manakkal Temple, Chempazanthi, Thiruvananthapuram
- Sree Balasubrahmanya Temple, Bharananganam, Meenachil, Kottayam
- Aakalpantha Prashobhini Sree Subrahmanya Temple, Poonjar Thekkekara, Meenachil, Kottayam
- Sree Brahmapuram (Mathaanam) Temple, Vadayar, ThalayolaParambu, Kottayam
- Chernnamangalam Siva Temple, Koduvazhannoor, Pulimath Vazhi, Thiruvananthapuram
- Sree Shakteeshwaram Temple, Vayalar, Alappuzha
- Ullala Omkareshwara (Shiva) Temple, Thalayazham, Vaikom, Kottayam
- Sree Nayinaar Deva Temple, Arumanoor, Neyyattinkara, Thiruvananthapuram
- Sree Vishwanatha Temple, Manathala, Gurupadapuri, Chavakad, Thrissur
- Vallabhasseril Siva Temple, Alamthuruthi, Tiruvalla, Pathanamthitta
- Sree Sankara Narayana Temple, Koovappadi, Cheranellur, Ernakulam
- Katiravan Kunnu Sree Balasubrahmanya Swamy Temple, Puthoor, Kollam
- Sree Narayana Maheshwara Temple, Pullazhi, Thrissur
- Myladum Kunnu Bhajana Madom Subrahmanya Temple, Anappad, Thiruvananthapuram
- Kumarapuram Sree Subrahmanya Temple, Maannanam, Kottayam
- Sree Ghuhanandapuram Temple, Thekkumbhagam, Chavara, Kollam
- Kuppana Sree Velayudhamangala Temple, Kollam
- Sree Swamy Madom Temple, Anjuthengu, Thiruvananthapuram
- Sree Amruthamkulangara Temple, Kollam
- Bhuvaneshwari Temple, Thachankonam, Varkala, Thiruvananthapuram
- Sree Chidambaranatha Temple, Oottara, Kanjiramkulam, Thiruvananthapuram
- Sree Kalikulangara Temple, Nandyattukunnam, Paravoor, Ernakulam
- Sanmargasandayini Sree Anandasayaneshwaram Temple, Kayippuram, Muhamma, Alappuzha
- Sree Shaktidhara Temple, Njarakkal, Vaipin, Ernakulam
- Sree Narayana MahavishnuTemple, Puliyannur, Meenachil, Kottayam
- Sree Narayanapuram Temple, Aashraamam, Kollam
- Plavazhikam Devi Temple, Nedunganda, Varkala, Thiruvananthapuram
- Shivadarshana Devaswom Temple, Pampadi, Kottayam
- Elankavu Sree Bhagavati Temple, Mullakkal, Alappuzha
- Chakkumarassery Srikumara Ganeshamangalam Temple, Vatanappally, Thrissur
- Sivadarshana Dewasom Temple, Pampadi, Kottayam
- Sree Balasubrahmannya Temple, Kurichikara, Thrissur
- Dharmagiri Sree Subrahmanya Swamy Temple, Thruthala, Palakkad
- Erected Madam (Guruswamy Mutt) at Kudakkalam, near Thalassery, Kannur
- Foundation Stone laid for Sree Narayana Velayudhan Kovil Pilackool, Marriamma Road, Thalassery
