= Bodhananda =

Hindu philosopher

Bodhananda (1883–1928) was an Indian Hindu philosopher. He was born in Thrissur of Kerala. He was the disciple and the nominated successor of his guru, called Narayana Guru, though both died only days apart.

== Biography ==
Bodhananda was born as Velayudhan on 28 January, 1882, in the Chirakkal locality, Trichur, Kerala, into a relatively affluent tharavad (joint family estate) named Ezhavan Parambu.

In his 18th year, he undertook intense spiritual penance in the Himalayas. At the age of 24, he established the Avadhoot Mutt in Trichur, a key center for Advaita Vedanta teachings. The Bodhananda movement, which had more than a dozen sanyasi disciples and tens of thousands of followers, merged with the Sharada Mutt on 1 May 1912. He played a key role in establishing multiple Sree Narayana Gurukula Yogams across Kerala and beyond. On 9 January 1928, the Sree Narayana Dharma Sangham was established with Bodhananda as founding President.

Bodhananda died on 24 September 1928 at the age of only 46, just four days after the passing of Sree Narayana Guru.
