= Padmanabhan Palpu =

Indian social reformer and freedom fighter (1863–1950)

Dr.Padmanabhan Palpu
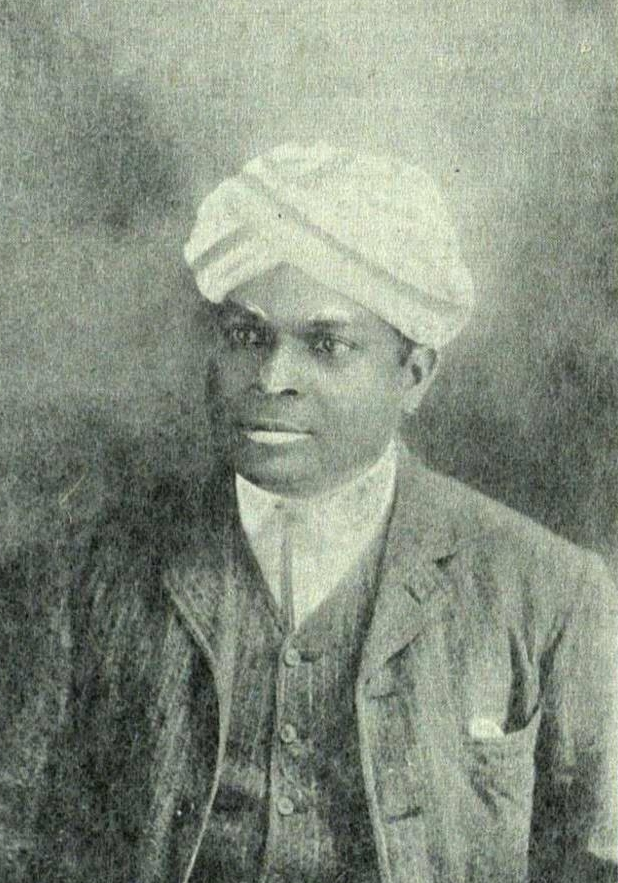

Personal life
- Born: 2 November 1863 Kingdom of Travancore (present day Thiruvananthapuram, Kerala, India)
- Died: 25 January 1950 (aged 86)
- Known for: Kerala reformation movement and medical services

Religious life
- Philosophy: Social equality

Padmanabhan Palpu (2 November 1863 – 25 January 1950) was a physician from the Kingdom of Travancore who served as a chief medical officer of Mysore State.

He led social activism for the Ezhava community in Kerala and led a movement for social equality. In 1903, he founded the Sree Narayana Dharma Paripalana Yogam (Society for the Propagation of the teachings of Sree Narayana Guru), whose first president was Narayana Guru, who sought an end to the caste system and preached his concept of "one caste, one religion, one god." His son Nataraja Guru became a successor of Narayana Guru. Palpu has been described as the "political father" of the Ezhavas. Sajil Sreedhar wrote a novel titled Athmasourabham based on the life of Dr.Palppu which was published in Yoganadam magazine owned by SNDP Yogam.

== Early life and education ==
Palpu was born in vanchiyoor ambalathu mukku Pettah, Thiruvananthapuram, then in the Kingdom of Travancore, India. His family (Thachakudi bloodline)consisted of wealthy and well-educated members who came from the Ezhava caste. The Ezhavas were traditionally occupied as warriors, arurvedic doctors, businessmen, weavers, farmers, toddy tappers. In addition, many had involvements in agriculture and ayurvedic medicine, and they were also occupied as shopkeepers, and businessmen.

Palpu, who had learned English from a Eurasian tutor from the age of 12, attended Maharaja's College in Thiruvananthapuram and matriculated there in 1883. He then wrote the examination for admission to medical studies. He was denied the admission though he ranked second. It was common knowledge that his caste-related birth determined the decision, even though the official reason given was that he was beyond the age limit. Like his older brother, he seems to have been able to use his family's association with Christian missionaries to avoid the usual rule in the kingdom that Ezhavas were forbidden from school attendance. He was subsequently refused admission to Travancore Medical College due to his caste. From 1885, he attended Madras Medical College, which was outside the kingdom, having raised money to do so through subscriptions and taking on debt. His financial situation was dire by the end of the first year, when he received an honour certificate, but he was able to complete the course with the aid of donations from various high-placed people. These donations were carefully scripted to prevent him from later taking up a position within the government, as Ezhavas were forbidden from such employment and many forward caste doctors would in any event refuse to work with backward caste colleagues. He went to England to further his medical training at London and Cambridge. Back in India and having been awarded his Licentiate in Medicine and Surgery in 1889, he found that his caste status prevented him from obtaining employment in the Travancore Health Service, which meant that he had to relocate to Mysore to get work.

== Mysore state service ==
Palpu became the chief medical officer of Mysore State. His salary was more than the salary of Travancore Diwan. Later he was selected to the British General Medical Council for virology. After his retirement, he was offered the post of Diwan in Baroda, but refused the offer. He was able to work for the British there as a public health doctor.

== Relationship with Swami Vivekananda ==
In 1892, while employed in the Kingdom of Mysore, Palpu met Swami Vivekananda during the latter's tour of southern India. Palpu briefed Vivekananda on the severe caste discrimination, untouchability, and institutional exclusion faced by the Ezhava community and other backward castes in the princely state of Travancore. This interaction prompted Vivekananda to visit Malabar and Travancore in late 1892, where his firsthand observations of caste practices led him to describe Kerala as a "lunatic asylum".

Vivekananda advised Palpu that secular and political agitations in India frequently lacked organizational longevity unless anchored to a spiritual foundation. He recommended that Palpu mobilize the community under an enlightened spiritual leader from within their own ranks.

Following this advice, Palpu aligned his social initiatives with Sree Narayana Guru, who had already initiated religious and social reforms through his 1888 consecration of a Shiva temple at Aruvippuram. Their partnership led to the establishment of the Sree Narayana Dharma Paripalana Yogam (SNDP Yogam) in 1903, with Narayana Guru as lifetime president, Palpu as founding vice-president, and Kumaran Asan as general secretary.

Palpu maintained ties with the Ramakrishna Mission circle in subsequent years. Through Vivekananda's disciple Sister Nivedita, Palpu obtained assistance and introductions to British parliamentarians to lobby against caste disability laws enforced in Travancore.

== Social activism ==
Becoming aware of the importance of education as a method of socio-economic advancement and also as means to improve health and hygiene, Palpu was the third signatory to the "Malayali Memorial", a petition organised and submitted to the Maharaja of Travancore on January 1, 1891, that primarily sought to address the concerns of those members of the Nair community, who were in government jobs but felt that the best of those jobs were dominated by non-Malayali Brahmins. The petition was amended to include a statement on the injustices faced by Ezhavas and was published in the Madras Times in July. Whilst the Memorial had no success, according to Robin Jeffrey it did indicate to Palpu a method by which he could continue to campaign for the improved position of Ezhavas in society. Caroline Wilson notes that he also petitioned the Houses of Parliament while in England.

Palpu was among those who attempted to use data from the 1891 census to highlight inequalities in Travancore society and he again made demands in 1895, when he petitioned the Diwan of Travancore, S. Shungrasoobyer, with a statement explaining the ways in which the Ezhavas suffered discrimination. He noted that if members of the community wanted education or government jobs then their only recourse was to convert from Hinduism to Christianity. Shungrasoobyer was slow in responding but in February 1896, when Palpu had taken leave from his job in Bangalore, Mysore, to press the matter in Thiruvananthapuram, he told Palpu that the government would open as many of its schools as possible to Ezhavas and that it would consider applications from qualified Ezhavas for posts in all departments other than Revenue. Anthropologist Ritty Lukose describes him as the "political father" of the Ezhavas.

In practice, when some Ezhava graduates applied for government jobs soon after Shungrasoobyer's announcement, they were told that there were no vacancies. Thus, later in 1896, Palpu again took leave from his job to campaign in Travancore. He organised a petition that attracted the signatures of 13,176 Ezhavas. This letter was presented to the Maharajah of Travancore and demanded their right to admission in schools run by the colonial government and access to employment in public service. The bar from education in government schools was noted as being inequitable given their claim that the Ezhavas paid more taxes than any other community in the kingdom. The petition was published in the Madras Mail in September of that year. This use of petitions as a vehicle to achieve a coalescence of communal consciousness and cause change was one of the first examples of such in the kingdom, where the ritually superior Brahmin groups held the majority of posts available in the administration of the state.

== Personal life ==
Palpu had a son, commonly known as Nataraja Guru.

== Legacy ==
Dr. Palpu College of Arts and Science in Pangode is named after him. Palpu influenced the political philosophy of C. Kesavan.
