= Chempazhanthy =

- Location in Kerala, India Chempazhanthy (India)
- Coordinates: 8°34′0″N 76°54′0″E
- Country: India
- State: Kerala
- District: Thiruvananthapuram

Government
  - Body: Thiruvananthapuram Corporation

Languages
  - Official: Malayalam, English
- Time zone: UTC+5:30 (IST)
- Postal code: 695587
- Vehicle registration: KL-22

Chempazhanthy is a region of Thiruvananthapuram City, the capital of Kerala state in India, which lies about 7 km north. Chempazhanthy became notable after the birth of Sree Narayana Guru. There was a small hut called "Vayalvaaram" where Sree Narayana Guru was born, in the Malayalam Era year 1032 in the Malayalam month of 'Chingam' under the star 'Chathayam' (August, 1856 AD) . His father was Maadan (Maadan Aasan). His mother was Kuttiamma. They had four children, one boy (Guru) and three girls.

The S.N. College is the landmark of the area.

== History ==
Chempazhanthy was the hereditary base of the "Chempazhanthy Pillai", who was prominent among the so-called Ettuveetil Pillamar (Pillais from Eight Houses) who rebelled against Travancore King Marthanda Varma, in the novel 'Marthandavarma' by Sri.C.V.Raman Pillai. Also Aniyoor a place in chempazhanthy was where the famous meeting between Sree Narayana Guru and Chattambi Swami took place and they discussed about the social situation of Kerala. Recently a "Smruthi Mandapam " was erected at the location as a remembrance of their meeting
