= Sri Narayana Jayanthi =

State festival of Kerala, India

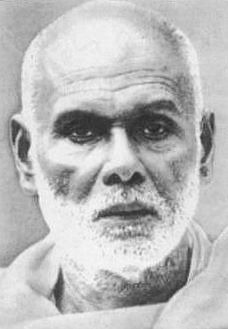
Sri Narayana Guru, spiritual Guru

Guru Jayanthi celebration at Gokarnanatheshwara Temple, Mangalore, Karnataka, India

Sri Narayana Jayanthi is a state festival of Kerala. It is celebrated on Chathayam day during the Onam season in Chingam month of Malayalam calendar. It marks the birthday of Narayana Guru, a saint and a social reformer of India who fought against the caste system of Hindu religion.

As a state festival, the day is a public holiday for schools and offices, including banks, in Kerala.

Guru's birthday is celebrated on the Chathayam asterism of the Malayalam month of Chingam (Leo). In a society broken into fragments by casteism and economic inequality, he emphasised the motto of 'one caste, one religion and one god.'

Communal harmony processions, conferences, floral tributes, community prayers, feeding for the poor and community feasts marks Jayanthi celebrations.

== See also ==
- Sree Narayana Guru
- Sree Narayana Jayanthi Boat Race
