= Daiva Daśakam =

Prayer penned by Narayana Guru

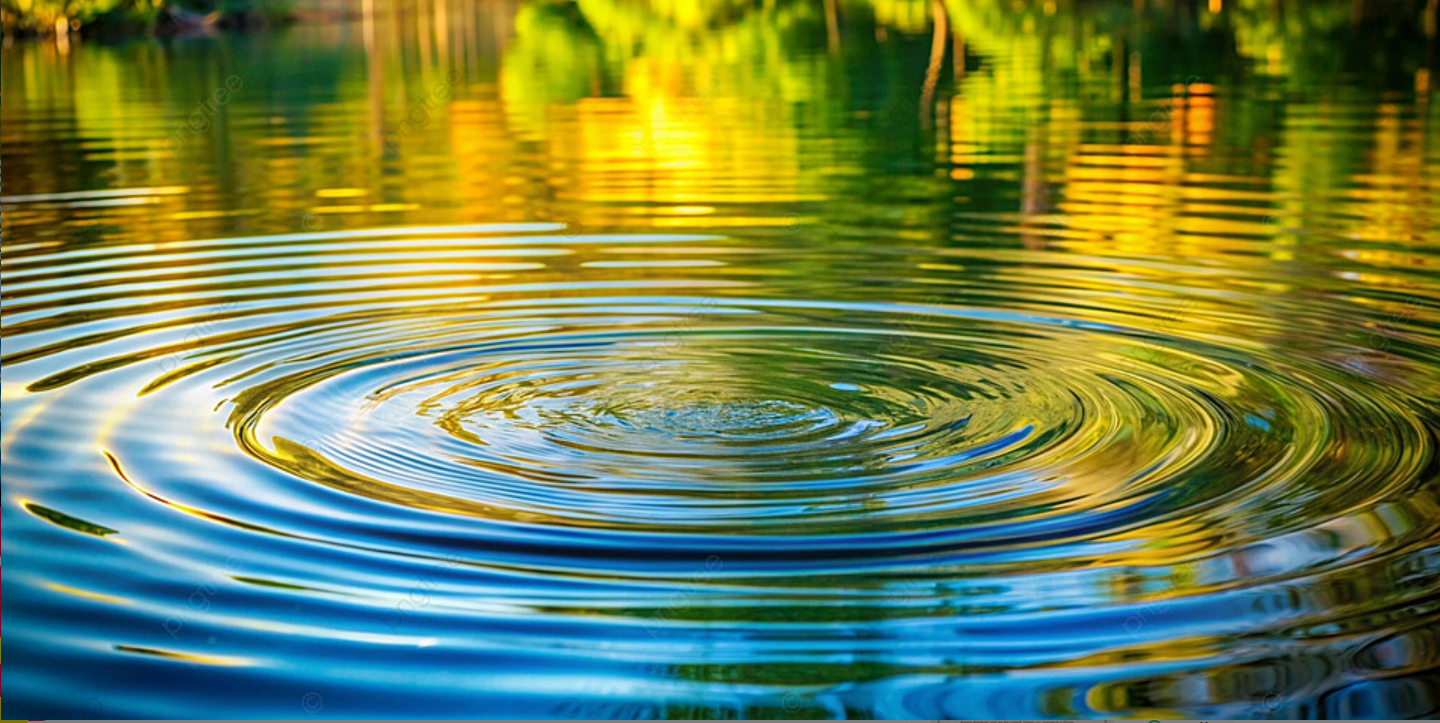
Guru: Have you seen the water? Nataraja Guru: Yes Guru: Do you know that wave is also water? Nataraja Guru: I know Guru: Then there is nothing new to know. Vedanta is so.

Daiva Daśakam (Ten Verses To God: The Universal Prayer) is a prayer penned by Narayana Guru circa 1914. The poem does not address any specific deity from any particular religion. Instead, it invokes a universal, compassionate concept of God rooted in Advaita philosophy. It emphasizes that God is not only the creator but also the creation itself and the material cause of the universe. In 2009, the Kerala state government recommended that it should become the national prayer of India. It has been translated into at least 100 languages and scripts.

Daiva Daśakam by Ashfiya Anwar

This work consists of ten slokas based on Advaita Vedanta philosophy. He composed it in the Aluva Advaita Ashram, for the students of various caste and religious groups. The Guru has written this work in a relatively soft language, embodying the visions he had realized up to that point in his sixties, after completing many philosophical works that are very grand in terms of language and concept. Although the language is simple, the work is rich in meaningful expressions. Daiva Dasakam is one of the most used poem in Kerala for community prayer.
