= Travancore Labour Association =

The Travancore Labour Association, which was established in 1922, was the first labour organisation formed in the princely state of Travancore, which now forms a part of the state of Kerala, India. Centred on the coir industry in the town of Alleppey, it grew from being a body intended to serve the needs of one particular factory to one which represented many workers in what was a substantial business sector in the town. It became notable for its involvement in affairs during the Great Depression and for its politicisation by communist activists.

== Alleppey coir industry ==
A facility for the manufacture of woven coir products in Alleppey, a coastal town and the centre for the industry in Travancore, was established by an American, James Darragh, in 1859. Such operations were mostly in the hands of local entrepreneurs of the famous Ezhava caste, who are held in myth to have brought coconut palms to the region from Sri Lanka when they migrated and for whom the tending of those palms was a traditional caste occupation, or avakasam. Export of products, however, was controlled by traders from Europe. The industry grew significantly in the years immediately after World War I, leading to what Robin Jeffrey has described as "a unique dilemma in twentieth-century Kerala: a shortage of labour" and to a significant recruitment campaign. Those who came to work in the industry, which was largely financed by the British and relied more on cottage workers than factory employment,

Those circumstances became poor when financial promises made by those who had recruited them were abandoned from 1931 onwards, with the onset of the Great Depression causing a plummet in the price of coir flooring products and the wages paid to produce them. The economic irony was that employment in the industry grew during this period because demand for simple, cheap floorcoverings increased. (Note: The output of coir mats and matting grew by 80 per cent and 47 percent, respectively, during the Depression era but the value grew only by 28 per cent. Real wages fell but it is not possible to quantify the extent.) Changes in census definitions may affect the enumeration but it seems clear that there had been a disproportionate increase in the number employed in the coir factories of Travancore around this time, with the figure rising from around 7,000 in 1931 to 32,000 a decade later, whilst the cottage worker element grew from 120,000 to 133,000. Although demand for labour increased, the turnover of employees was high and there was a surplus of people looking for work both in the 40 factories of Alleppey and in the numerous small, often short-lived factories that were set up in rural areas around the town. Jeffrey estimates that as many as 50,000 people had been exposed to factory employment by 1939 and

... the fact that many of them moved back and forth between their villages and the factories meant that the number of people exposed to ideas of class struggle were larger than they would have been if the labour force had been static. ... And when a youth came to a coir factory for the first time, talk of unions, strikes, and capitalists, need not have been totally new to him: he may have heard it all in his village ... Since ideas of class-consciousness did not have to be learned completely in the factories, more people could learn them.

== Origins ==
The coir workers became dis-satisfied with the ability of their communal associations – most notably, the Sree Narayana Dharma Paripalana – to address their changed circumstances a decade or more before the Depression.Joseph Tharamangalam states that it was created by "a yard superintendent and foreman in 1922 named P.K Bava or popularly known as Vadappuram Bava. during the boom years, as an association of workers employed by the Empire Coir Works in Alleppey. The Travancore Labour Association (TLA) was established and Before long, it had expanded its influence to represent coir workers elsewhere in the town. It was at first primarily more a caste association than a trade union: its efforts were less focussed on employment matters than on the well-being of its membership in a wider social sense. It promoted welfare by encouraging various educational facilities and an ayurvedic hospital; its members were active in caste-related affairs such as those that gave rise to the Temple Entry Proclamation and campaigns aimed at ending the practice of Untouchability. A call in the early 1920s for representation in the legislative assembly of Travancore was an early sign of the trend that was to develop. The TLA became an increasingly militant body and did much to encourage the growth of trade unionism in other industries throughout the Alleppey district. By the mid-1930s, it was campaigning for employment legislation to protect workers in all industries and had taken part in the All-Kerala Workers Conference of 1935.

== Politicisation ==
The TLA developed close connections at first with the Congress Socialist Party (CSP), which organised that conference, and later with the Communist Party of India (CPI). The influence of the CSP became apparent from 1934 when it began to radicalise the organisation, simultaneously using it as a political vehicle to support demands for "responsible government" (Note: The campaign for "responsible government" was led by the Travancore section of the Indian National Congress.) in a campaign that favoured Indian nationalism and challenged the authority of the princely state, the role of the higher castes and the influence of colonial business investment. (Note: Although troubled by the effects of colonial capital, the TLA was central to the organisation of a large gathering to express grief when George V, the British king and Indian emperor, died in 1936. Attitudes to imperial rule among workers in Travancore changed dramatically over the subsequent decade, exemplified by the Punnapra-Vayalar uprising.) Manali Desai says that it used the travails of the Depression era "to justify demands for a halt to cuts in wages, provision of unemployment, old-age and sickness benefits, regulation of wages, elimination of sub-contracting of work, and an end to petty exactions and retrenchment".

The first strike of workers in Alleppey had been organised by the TLA around 1925–1926, some time after the demand for legislative representation had been made. A later general strike, when under the influence of the CSP in 1938, lasted more than three weeks, involving many thousands of workers (Note: The number of workers involved in the 1938 strike is variously reported. Desai notes an estimate of 200,000 people, while Heller puts the figure at 40,000.) as well as numerous CSP activists who had moved from the neighbouring area of Malabar. The strike had protested the autocracy of Travancore's maharajah, then Chithira Thirunal Balarama Varma, and a decision to ban the state's Indian National Congress (INC) party, The strike ended due to the negotiations by the INC and the Sree Narayana Dharma Paripalana (SNDP). This effort by these relatively moderate organisations did not enamour them to socialists and led to the CSP gaining control of the union. Patrick Heller notes that this in turn led to trade unionism's "... [emergence] as the dominant force in the nationalist and democratic movement in Travancore" and to the spread of unionism to the agrarian sector, the latter being encouraged by workers from the coir factories who visited rural areas to spread the word. It was the CSP leaders of the 1938 action who caused the TLA to come under the influence of the CPI, to which they had transferred their allegiance by 1940.

Robin Jeffrey has said that

Two things stand out about the organisation of workers in the coir industry centred around Alleppey in the 1930s. First, in contradiction to one strand of conventional wisdom about labour, the coir workers' union grew in strength and militancy during Depression. Second, the union successfully sublimated the deep caste and religious antagonisms of Kerala society – similar communal fissures elsewhere in India ripped unions apart – such that by the 1940s it could fairly describe itself as a class-conscious organisation.

Membership of the TLA grew from around 3,000 to over 7,000 during the Depression era, although this has to be placed in context with the growth in the number of people employed in the industry. In 1938, when the Travancore Trade Union Act became law, the Association was the first to register itself under the terms of the Act and did so using the name of the Travancore Coir Factory Workers Union.
