= Narayana Guru =

Indian spiritual leader and social reformer (1856–1928)

Sree Narayana Guru
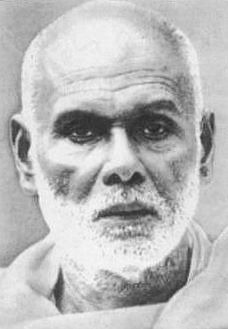

Personal life
- Born: 20 August 1856 Chempazhanthy, Kingdom of Travancore (present-day Thiruvananthapuram district, Kerala, India)
- Died: 20 September 1928 (aged 72) Varkala, Kingdom of Travancore (present-day Sivagiri, Kerala, India)
- Known for: Kerala reformation movement

Religious life
- Philosophy: Interpretation of Advaita Vedanta

Sree Narayana Guru (IPA: [nɑːrɑːjɐɳɐ guˈru]) (20 August 1856 – 20 September 1928) was a philosopher, spiritual leader and social reformer in India. He led a reform movement against the injustice in the caste-ridden society of Kerala in order to promote spiritual enlightenment and social equality. A quote of his that defined his movement was "one caste, one religion, and one god for all human beings". He is the author of the Advaita poem Daiva Dasakam, which is one of the most used poem in Kerala for community prayer.

French philosopher and Nobel prize laureate for literature, Romain Rolland described Narayana guru as 'Jnani of Karma', noting that he exemplified how faith could be used to bring about social change.

== Biography ==
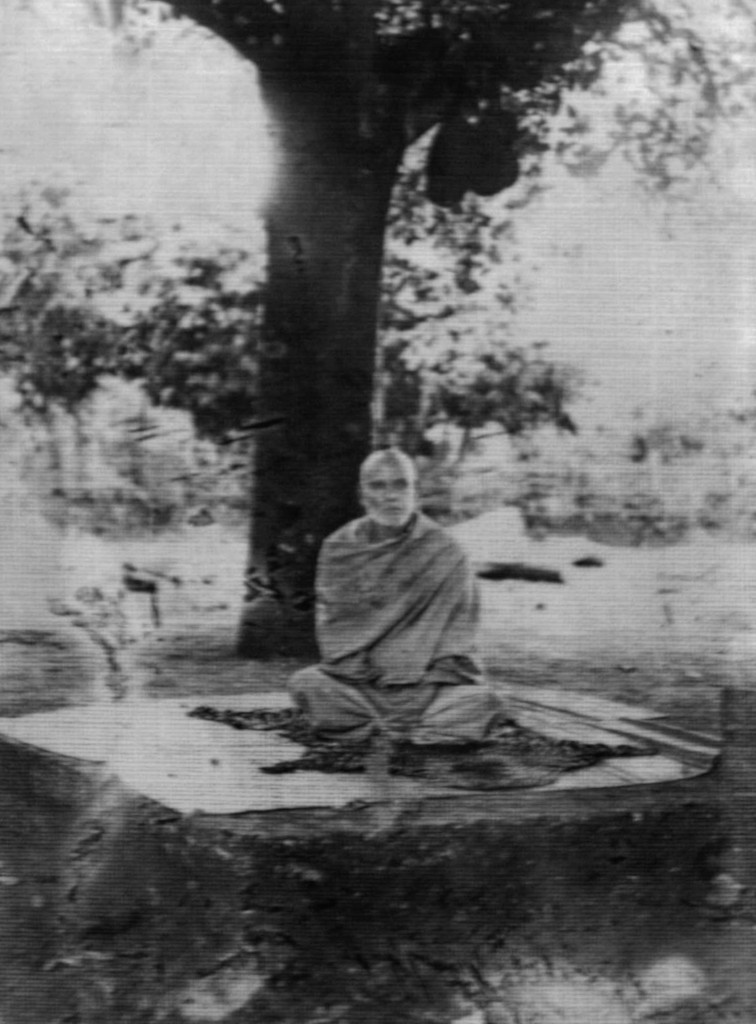
Narayana Guru at Meditation. He meditated for 8 years at Pillathadam cave at Maruthwamala mountain and attained enlightenment. The area was secluded with heavy forest and inhabited with wild life.

Narayanan, né Nanu, was born on 20 August 1856 to Madan Asan and Kuttiyamma in an Ezhava family of ayurvedic physicians, in the village of Chempazhanthy near Thiruvananthapuram, in the erstwhile state of Travancore. Unlike other Ezhavas who confined their Sanskrit reading to ayurvedic works, Narayana guru studied religious texts as well. His early education was in the gurukula way under Chempazhanthi Mootha Pillai during which time his mother died when he was 15. At the age of 21, he went to central Travancore to learn from Raman Pillai Asan, a Sanskrit scholar who taught him Vedas, Upanishads and the literature and logical rhetoric of Sanskrit. A year later, he married Kaliamma but soon disassociated himself from the marriage to commence his public life as a social reformer. He returned to his village in 1881, when his father was seriously ill, and started a village school where he taught local children which earned him the name Nanu Asan.

Leaving home, he traveled through Kerala and Tamil Nadu. During these journeys he met Chattampi Swamikal, a social and religious reformer who introduced Guru to Ayyavu Swamikal, from whom he learned meditation and yoga. Later, he continued his wanderings until he reached the Pillathadam cave at Maruthwamala where he set up a hermitage and practiced meditation for the next eight years.

In 1888, he visited Aruvippuram and spent time meditating in a cave near the Neyyar River. It was here that his first disciple, Sivalingadasa Swamikal, who hailed from an orthodox Nair family, discovered him. During his stay, he consecrated a rock from the deepest part of the Neyyar River, a whirlpool sinkhole known as 'Sankaran Kuzhi'. It is believed that it was in this 'Sankaran Kuzhi' sage Agastya gave his worshipping Shiva Linga to Neyyar river somewhere before leaving. This rock was established as the idol of Shiva, and the site has since been known as the Aruvippuram Shiva Temple. The act, which later came to be known as Aruvipuram Pratishta, created a social commotion among the so-called 'upper caste' Brahmins who questioned Guru's right as an Ezhava and a non-Brahmin, to consecrate the idol, essentially asking who had given a non-Brahmin, and especially an Ezhava, the authority to perform such a consecration. His reply to them, "This is Ezhava Shiva". The statement silenced them because of the powerful argument it implicitly carried: there is no such thing as an "Ezhava Shiva" or a "Brahmin Shiva." Shiva is universal and does not discriminate against anyone. Therefore, the Brahmins could not claim to be advocates of Shiva or determine whom Shiva would like or dislike. It also silently, yet powerfully, questioned the authority of Brahmins over matters relating to God and worship. This later became a famous quote, used against casteism. It was here, the Sree Narayana Dharma Paripalana Yogam (SNDP Yogam) was founded on 15 May 1903 by the efforts of Padmanabhan Palpu with Narayana Guru as its founder president.

Guru shifted his base to Sivagiri, near Varkala in 1904 where he opened a school for children from the lower strata of the society and provided free education to them without considering their caste. However, it took him seven years to build a temple there, the Sarada Mutt was built in 1912. He also built temples in other places such as Thrissur, Kannur, Anchuthengu, Thalassery, Kozhikode, and Mangalore and it took him to many places including Sri Lanka (then called Ceylon) where he made his final visit in 1926. On his return to India, he was involved in a number of activities including the planning of the Sivagiri pilgrimage which was planned after his visit to Pallathuruthy in 1927 to attend the anniversary of the S.N.D.P. Yogam.

Soon after the meeting at Pallathuruthy, which was the last public function he attended, Guru became ill and underwent treatment at places such as Aluva, Thrissur, Palakkad, and finally to Chennai; the physicians attended to him included Ayurvedic physicians like Cholayil Mami Vaidyar, Panappally Krishnan Vaidyar and Thycauttu Divakaran Moos as well as allopathic physicians viz. Krishnan Thampi, Panikker, Palpu and a European physician by name, Noble. He returned to Sarada Mutt and died on 20 September 1928, at the age of 72.

== Legacy ==
=== Fight against casteism ===
Casteism was practised in Kerala during the 19th and early 20th centuries and the backward castes such as Ezhavas and other untouchable castes like Paraiyars, Adivasis and Pulayars had to suffer discrimination from the upper caste community. It was against this discrimination that Guru performed his first major public act, the consecration of Siva idol at Aruvippuram in 1888. Overall, he consecrated forty five temples across Kerala and Tamil Nadu. His consecrations were not necessarily conventional deities; these included a slab inscribed with the words, "Truth, Ethics, Compassion, Love", a vegetarian Shiva, a mirror, and an Italian sculpture. He propagated the ideals of compassion and religious tolerance and one of his noted works, Anukampadasakam, extols various religious figures such as Krishna, The Buddha, Adi Shankara, Jesus Christ.

=== Meeting with Mahatma Gandhi ===
On 12 March 1925, Mahatma Gandhi visited the Sivagiri Ashram in Varkala, Kerala, during the Vaikom Satyagraha. During his stay, he met Narayana Guru, who emphasized the need for education and wealth for the upliftment of lower castes rather than mixed eating and marriages. This conversation, facilitated by a translator, also addressed religious freedom and the caste system. Narayana Guru's logical arguments and inclusive practices profoundly impacted Gandhi. Witnessing lower-caste children reciting prayers and their knowledge of the Upanishads impressed Gandhi and challenged his casteist views. Inspired by Guru's teachings, Gandhi re-evaluated his stance on caste and untouchability. As a result of this transformative experience, Mahatma Gandhi began to focus on eradicating untouchability and upliftment of Harijans (Dalits) in the national movement. He renamed his newspaper "Young India" to "Harijan" and made the eradication of untouchability a central part of his mission. This marked a significant shift in Gandhi's approach, integrating the fight against caste discrimination into the broader struggle for India's independence.

Mahatma Gandhi subsequently renamed his newspaper from "Young India" to "Harijan" and made the eradication of untouchability and upliftment of Harijans a part of the national movement. Anantha Shenoy, a Brahmin and a Gandhian from Kannur, read about this in Young India and was deeply inspired. He later became the Guru's disciple and was ordained as Swamy Ananda Theerthan, regarded as the last initiated disciple of Narayana Guru

=== Role in Kerala's early labour movement ===
On 31 March 1922, under the guidance of Sree Narayana Guru, the Travancore Labour Association, which is the first organised labour union in Kerala was established at the Kalappura Temple grounds in Alappuzha. The initiative followed Guru's instruction to Swami Satyavratan, who conveyed his blessings and directive to organise workers facing exploitation in colonial-era coir factories.

The union's formation was led by Vadappuram Bava, a coir worker who, in 1920, met Guru through T. C. Kesavan Vaidyar and appealed for a solution to the harsh conditions faced by labourers. Guru reportedly asked Bava, "If what I command becomes your deliverance, will you accept it?" to which Bava replied, "Whatever you instruct will be our salvation." Guru then responded with a call to collective action: "Form a union. Let your strength come from unity and freedom." The inaugural meeting, held after dusk to avoid police intervention, drew around 300 workers. Dr. M. K. Antony was appointed president and Vattappuram Bava served as secretary.

The union later became the Travancore Labour Association and played a foundational role in Kerala's labour movement, preceding the emergence of communist politics in India. In one of their final meetings, Guru advised Bava: "Earn the trust of all and move forward. The age of the workers is coming."

=== First All India Industrial and Agricultural Exhibition ===
In 1905, Narayana Guru organized All India Industrial and Agricultural Exhibition at Kollam, first time in India to facilitate industrialization and agriculture. Guru wanted to convey the importance of regaining the lost places of worship (later rebuilt by the Guru himself) and wealth. This was in line with his quote: "Vidhya kond prabhudhar aavuka, sangadana kond shakthar aavuka, vyavasayam kond abhivrithi neduka" meaning "Become enlightened through education, become strong through organization, and achieve prosperity through industry."

=== Vaikom Satyagraha ===
The social protest of Vaikom Satyagraha was an agitation led by backward caste communities against discrimination in Hindu society of Travancore. It was reported that the trigger for the protest was an incident when Narayana Guru was stopped from passing through a road leading to the Vaikom Temple by an upper caste person. It prompted Kumaran Asan and Muloor S.Padmanabha Panicker, both disciples of Guru, to compose poems in protest of the incident. T. K. Madhavan, another disciple, petitioned the Sree Moolam Popular Assembly in 1918 for rights to enter the temple and worship, regardless of the caste. A host of people including K. Kelappan and K. P. Kesava Menon formed a committee and announced the Kerala Paryatanam Movement and with the support of Mahatma Gandhi. The agitation developed into a mass movement which resulted in the opening of the temple as well as three roads leading to it to people of all castes. The protest also influenced the Temple Entry Proclamation of 1936.

=== Sivagiri pilgrimage ===
The Sivagiri pilgrimage was conceived by three of the disciples of Guru viz. Vallabhasseri Govindan Vaidyar, T. K. Kittan Writer and Muloor S. Padmanabha Panicker which Guru approved in 1928, with his own recommendations. He suggested that the goals of the pilgrimage should be the promotion of education, cleanliness, devotion to God, organization, agriculture, trade, handicrafts, and technical training and advised Vaidyar and Writer to organise a series of lectures on these themes to stress the need for the practice of these ideals, stating this to be the core purpose of Sivagiri pilgrimage. However, his death soon after delayed the project until 1932 when the first pilgrimage was undertaken from Elavumthitta in Pathanamthitta District.

=== India's first All Religions Conference ===
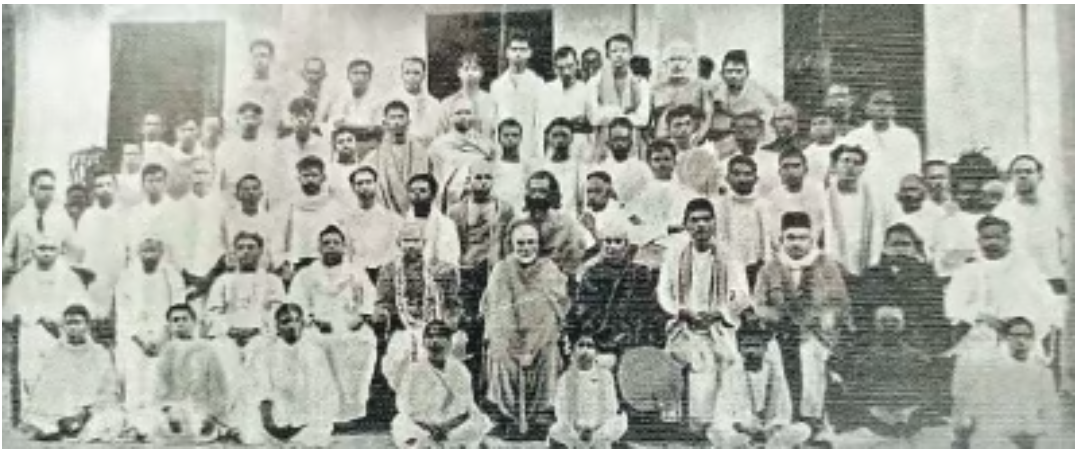
Sree Narayana Guru with leaders of different religions during all-religion meet . A photo taken during the all-religion meet at Aluva in 1924.

Guru organized an All Religion Conference in 1923 at Alwaye Advaita Ashram, which was first such event in India. During this period, communalization escalated into riots in India. In Kerala, the Malabar rebellion occurred. According to the Simon Commission report, more than 112 major communal riots took place in India between 1922 and 1927. Throughout this time, the guru also received letters from a communal leader, Abdul Hamid Qadri Badayuni, from Uttar Pradesh, who later moved to Pakistan. The guru responded to his queries and questions through letters. The All Religions' Conference, which was the first of its kind in India, was organized against this backdrop to foster peace among the various religions of the country and at the entrance of the conference, he arranged for a message to be displayed which read, We meet here not to argue and win, but to know and be known. The conference has since become an annual event, organised every year at the Ashram.

=== Guru's rational spiritual dialogues ===
==== Limits of religious explanation ====
During a visit to Sri Lanka, Narayana Guru engaged in a philosophical conversation with the country's highest Buddhist monk. When Guru asked, "Do you know the cause of birth?", the monk answered, "Karma". Guru then asked, "If so, how did life begin in the first place?" The monk was unable to respond. Narayana Guru remarked, "This is the case with all religions. There are no answers to many questions posed by rational thought. Religious belief often transcends rationality. The logic of worldly life only fits spiritual thinking up to a certain extent."

==== Sahodaran Ayyappan and rationalist reinterpretation ====
Sahodaran Ayyappan, a pioneering rationalist and the founder of the first rationalist organization in Kerala, was also a close disciple of Sree Narayana Guru. Known for his progressive and bold reinterpretations, Ayyappan rephrased Guru's famous message - "Oru Jathi, Oru Matham, Oru Daivam Manushyan; Jathi chodikkaruth, parayaruth, chinthikkaruth" ("One Caste, One Religion, One God for Mankind; Do not ask, speak, or think caste") into a more radical slogan: "Jathi Venda, Matham Venda, Daivam Venda Manushyan" ("No Caste, No Religion, No God for human beings").

When some followers expressed concern that this reinterpretation might offend the Guru, Narayana Guru is said to have replied succinctly: "Ayyappan is right"

==== Rituals ====
A well-known anecdote in Kerala recounts Narayana Guru's sharp response when a judge once asked him whether burning or burying was the correct method for disposing of a dead body. Guru replied, "Crush them in an oil-press; they'll make good manure." When the judge expressed shock, Guru simply asked, "Why? Will it hurt?"

In the Aparakriya section of Sree Narayana Smrithi, Guru elaborated on this view through a dialogue between the guru and disciples. He emphasized that cremation should be performed not as a ritualistic necessity but for the sake of cleanliness and public hygiene. He discouraged all superstitious death related rituals and clarified that symbolic offerings like 'pindam' can be offered.

Guru further stated that for one who has a clear, doubt-free understanding (of truth), all the death-related rituals (like ashaucha and other ceremonies) performed out of ignorance are meaningless and merely a play of ignorance, Such a person need not ever follow these customs. However, for others who still operate within the framework of karma and belief systems, certain practices may be prescribed based on context, time, and societal norms.

==== Idol worship ====
Several contemporary Vedantins also expressed opposition to Guru's emphasis on idol consecration in temples. During the consecration of the Jagannath Temple in Thalassery, Bodhananda Swamikal organized a major protest against idol worship. However, upon seeing Guru in person, Bhodhananda Swamikal is said to have experienced a spiritual transformation, bowed at Guru's feet, and later became his disciple.

Similarly, Vagbhatananda, a contemporary reformer visited Guru to oppose the practice of installing idols in temples. Through a thoughtful exchange, Narayana Guru explained the symbolic and spiritual relevance of idol worship. Convinced by this perspective, Vagbhatananda ultimately acknowledged the depth of Guru's insight and sought reconciliation.

Vagbhatanandan: "I do not share your opinions."

Guru: "Oh, is that so? I share your opinions."

Vagbhatanandan: "How is the soil at the Advaita Ashrama?"

Guru: "While we were traveling in Maruthwamala and Aruvipuram, there were stones, forests, and meadows. Here, the soil is soft, like a pillow."

Vagbhatanandan: "I've heard that nowadays you are erecting stones (idol consecration)."

Guru: "You are a rogue elephant in Advaita and Vedanta philosophy. You will hear many things like that. But as Vagbhatanandan, whatever you hear won't be a lie."

Vagbhatanandan: "But erecting these stones all over the place..."

Guru: "Many writings are on stones, right? Also, great walls and historic monuments are made of stone. Is there any discrimination against stones?"

Vagbhatanandan: "We should acknowledge stones for their strength and stability, but I cannot agree with erecting stone idols."

Guru: (looking at the stone in his earrings) "We are only erecting stones, but you are always carrying them."

Vagbhatanandan: (ashamed)

Guru: "There is nothing wrong in wearing them in the ears, just don't carry them in the mind."

Vagbhatanandan: "Pardon me, Swami. As someone like you who knows Brahmam, the consecration of idols disturbed my mind, so I asked. How did stones become Ishvara?"

Guru: "All stones are Shiva. Shiva means emptiness, Nirguna Para Brahmam. All living beings are spiritual brothers. Everyone should be spiritually elevated, irrespective of their background. There should be methods and institutions for this. Those who own institutions are often not ready for it. Through stones, one should be capable of seeing Shiva and realize that stones, soil, plants, and flowers are all one. Through stones, one should come to know the Jagath, to know the Jagannathan."

Vagbhatanandan: "I offer my words at your feet. I have no reply. I am not a soldier with weapons who can oppose you."

==== Interaction with an atheist follower ====
After the prathishta karmam (consecration ceremony) at Kolathukara Shiva Temple, Narayana Guru was resting when a man named Raman Muthalali came to meet him. Raman introduced himself as an atheist and stated that he did not believe in God. Guru, surprised, asked why he was actively involved in the temple committee despite his atheistic views. Raman replied, "Yes, I am an atheist, but I participate in the temple committee purely as a form of cultural celebration."

He further added, "Guru, I do not believe in God, idol worship, or temples. The concept of a God with a wife and children is not something I can accept. I do not pray either. However, I believe in you as a Guru and have deep respect for you. For someone like me, can you compose a prayer that we can use?"

Narayana Guru agreed to the request. The prayer was written in prose (gadhyam) form, rather than in verse, and did not refer to any specific deity.

All that are seen are of the forms, Physical (stoolam), subtle or the conceptual (sooskhmam), and Causal (kaaranam) and they rise from and set into the Paramatmav (Supreme Self). Hence, there is nothing else other than Paramatmav.The Paramatmav destroys all negative traits and eliminates forever such tendencies from regenerating. The grace of Paramatman cleanses my senses allowing me to tread the path of virtue. That Paramatmav is to be meditated upon, and I am meditating upon its divine manifestation.O' Paramatmav Bless me with your grace so that I may always meditate upon you and experience your bliss.

Oh Daivame! Anything we perceive is not eternal. Like a water bubble, the body too is not permanent. There is nothing to say except that everything is like a dream. We are not body, we are the knowledge. Even before the body came into existence, we existed as knowledge. Even when our body disappears, we will continue to remain radiating like this. We will not be affected by the various dilemmas of life such as birth, death, poverty, disease, fear. May I contemplate on the divine words thus being instructed and on the instructor of these divine words while eating, sleeping and ceaselessly at all times.By taking away forever all my impurities, give me your bliss! Bless me in leading a prosperous and peaceful life to finally reach your abode.

==== From Blessing to Legacy: The Story Behind the National Tribute ====
Sir S. Rm. M. Annamalai Chettiar also known as Raja of Chettinad, a wealthy philanthropist from Chettinad, and his wife Rani Lady Seethai Aachi were childless for a long time. Despite consulting many people and visiting various temples, they had no success. During Narayana Guru’s visit to Tamil Nadu en route to Sri Lanka, the couple heard about him and came to meet him. While Raja Annamalai had no particular belief in the Guru, his wife had great faith. Without them saying anything, the Guru gave two bananas to his wife and asked her to eat them. She did so and later conceived twin children. One of the twins was the mother of P. Chidambaram, who would frequently visit Sivagiri.

When P. Chidambaram became the Finance Minister of India, he released a ₹5 coin commemorating Narayana Guru.

For the construction of a statue of Narayana Guru at the Thalassery Jagannatha Temple, photographer Pattatharil Shekharan of Thalassery, known for capturing many historic moments in Kerala was sent by Moorkoth Kumaran to Sivagiri Mutt to photograph the Guru. According to Shekharan’s account, he was initially anxious about how to photograph the Guru, as he felt hesitant to direct him to pose in a specific way. He thought of taking a photograph similar to the profile images of British kings that appeared on Indian coins at the time.

When Shekharan met the Guru, the Guru asked, "Do you know how to take photographs?" Gaining confidence, Shekharan replied, "Yes, very well." The Guru then asked, "Can you photograph those mangoes?" After Shekharan focused his camera and said he was ready, the Guru humorously asked, "Can you also capture the ‘rasam’ (essence) of the mango in the photo?" The Guru then inquired, "How do you want the photo to be taken? Do you want it like for the coin?"

The Guru then posed exactly as Shekharan had envisioned in his mind. This photograph was later used for the design of the ₹5 commemorative coin issued in his honour.

=== Universal approach to spiritual initiation ===
Narayana Guru provided spiritual initiation to individuals from all faiths and sects, but only to those whom he personally deemed spiritually prepared. He initially declined sannyasa deeksha to Bodhananda Swami, granting it only during the second request. He also refused sannyasa deeksha to Varathoor Kaniyil Kunhikkanan, despite his repeated requests. Kunhikkanan, who had invited the Guru to consecrate the Jagannath Temple in Thalassery, was told that he did not possess sannyasa yoga in this lifetime. However, the Guru granted his modest wish to be placed in samadhi after his death.

He initiated an individual from an orthodox Nair family in Koyilandy, belonging to the Koyappali family to which K. Kelappan also belonged. This individual had missed seeing the Guru upon his arrival due to the large crowd at the Thalassery railway station. He had come to Thalassery to write the Indian Civil Service examination and could not wait to meet the Guru in person, as he would otherwise miss the train back to Koyilandy. Instead, he composed a poem in praise of the Guru and sent it through a friend. Upon reading the poem, the Guru blessed him, saying that he would become a great yogi.This individual later became known as Sivananda Yogi of Koyilandy.

Guru Narayana initiated Abdul Khader Masthan, a Muslim man, into spirituality. Born into the traditional Muslim family of Valiyakandy in Kannur city, which was traditionally involved in the copper business. Masthan approached Narayana Guru during the Guru's stay in Thalassery, shortly after the consecration of the Shiva idol at the Jagannath Temple, having heard from others about the remarkable event of temple entry being granted to marginalized communities.

During the temple consecration, Guru asked, "Who are the people standing near the temple gate?" The temple custodians replied, "They are people of the Dalit caste." Guru then asked why they were not permitted to enter the temple. The orthodox custodians had reportedly opposed the entry of lower-caste communities and told Narayana Guru, "Let one varsham be completed before allowing such access," with varsham in Malayalam meaning both "year" and "rain". At that very moment, clouds gathered in the clear sky, and it began to rain. After the rain stopped, Guru gently reminded those who opposed the entry of Dalits: "A varsham is over. Let us allow all into our temple." Laughter erupted in acknowledgment of Guru's wit and wisdom, and everyone nodded in agreement.

Intrigued by these events and the Guru's reputation, Masthan visited him and asked, "Are you the one who consecrated the idol?" When the Guru confirmed and asked masthan that 'Do you want to see the god', Masthan asked whether it was truly possible to "see God". Narayana Guru replied that one cannot perceive the divine with ordinary eyes, but invited Masthan to hold his hand and look toward the horizon. Masthan reportedly entered a deep spiritual trance and, upon regaining consciousness, exclaimed, "I have seen God," marking a profound spiritual awakening.

Later, Masthan presented the Guru with a copper plate inscribed in Chenthamizh (classical Tamil), which he had acquired through his family's trade. Being illiterate and unable to understand the script, he asked the Guru for help. Narayana Guru examined the inscription but did not reveal its meaning. Instead, he advised Masthan to consult Sufi saints in Tamil Nadu. Following this guidance, Masthan met a Sufi saint who interpreted the inscription as a Sufi text. Deeply inspired, Masthan later became a revered Sufi mystic known as Icha Mastan, and composed several devotional poems, including verses in praise of Lord Shiva.

Narayana Guru welcomed a Muslim named Khader during his Sri Lankan visit who expressed a keen interest in becoming his disciple. Khader inquired whether he would be accepted into the group and if a change of religion was necessary. The Guru assured him that changing his religion was not a prerequisite to becoming a disciple. A year later, during Narayana Guru's second visit at Sri Lanka, Khader met him again, this time dressed as a Hindu saint instead of his usual white Muslim attire. The Guru, feigning ignorance, asked Khader who he was. Disappointed, Khader reminded the Guru that he was his disciple, initiated the previous year. Narayana Guru expressed his recognition of the 'old' Khader and reiterated that changing his Muslim attire was not necessary to be his disciple.

A European named Ernest Kirk was similarly drawn to the Guru's teachings and became his disciple. The Guru did not require him to change his name. At the time of his sannyasa deeksha, the Guru deviated from traditional rituals, omitting customary practices such as tonsure and the observance of specific vratas. Instead, he provided Kirk with a coat, pants, shoes, and a tie in place of the traditional kashayavastra, stating that such attire was more appropriate for the European climate. As part of the initiation, the Guru personally placed the shoes on his feet and tied the tie around his neck, naming him Swami Ernest Kirk. He emphasized that Kirk should retain his own culture and heritage while pursuing the spiritual path

=== Notable disciples ===
- Bodhananda Swamikal
- Nataraja Guru
- Kumaran Asan
- Sahodaran Ayyappan
- T. K. Madhavan
- C. V. Kunhiraman
- Padmanabhan Palpu
- Muloor S. Padmanabha Panicker
- Velutheri Kesavan Vaidyar

=== Ashtalakshyangal ===
- Vidyabhyasam
- Shuchitwam
- Eeshwaravishwasam
- Krishi
- Kaithozhil
- Kachawadam
- Sanghadana
- Shastra sanketika Parisheelanam

=== Writings and philosophy ===
Guru published 45 works in Malayalam, Sanskrit and Tamil languages which include Atmopadesa Śatakam, a hundred-verse spiritual poem and Daiva Dasakam, a universal prayer in ten verses. He also translated three major texts, Thirukural of Valluvar, Ishavasya Upanishad and Ozhivil Odukkam of Kannudaiya Vallalaar. It was he who propagated the motto, One Caste, One Religion, One God for All (Oru Jathi, Oru Matham, Oru Daivam, Manushyanu) which has become popular as a saying in Kerala. He furthered the non-dualistic philosophy of Adi Sankara by bringing it into practice by adding the concepts of social equality and universal brotherhood.

== Philosophy ==
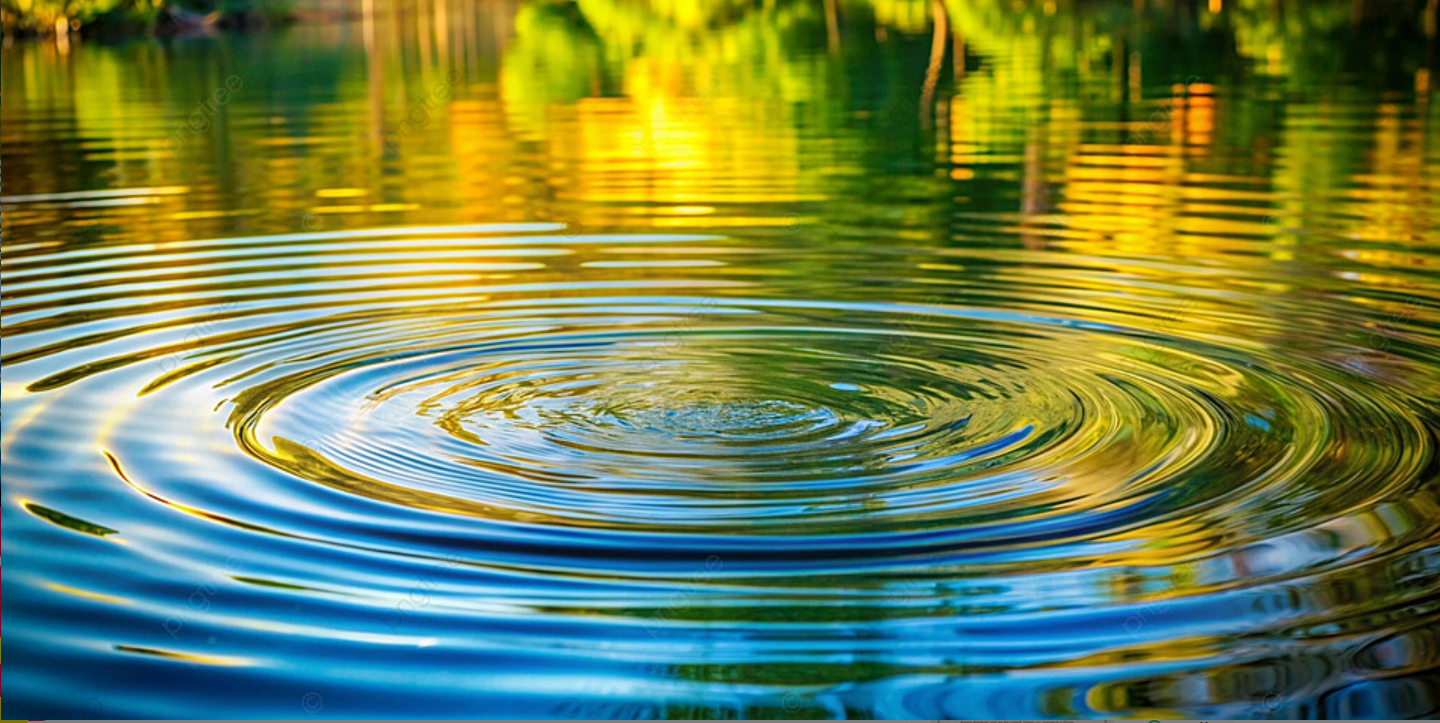
(The Guru asked Nataraja Guru before he became a sanyasi, "Do you want to understand Vedanta?" Nataraja, who was staring intently into the Guru's eyes, even forgot to say 'yes'). "Guru: Have you seen the water? Nataraja Guru: Yes Guru: Do you know that wave is also water? Nataraja Guru: I know Guru: Then there is nothing new to know. Vedanta is so.

== Public acceptance, honours and veneration ==
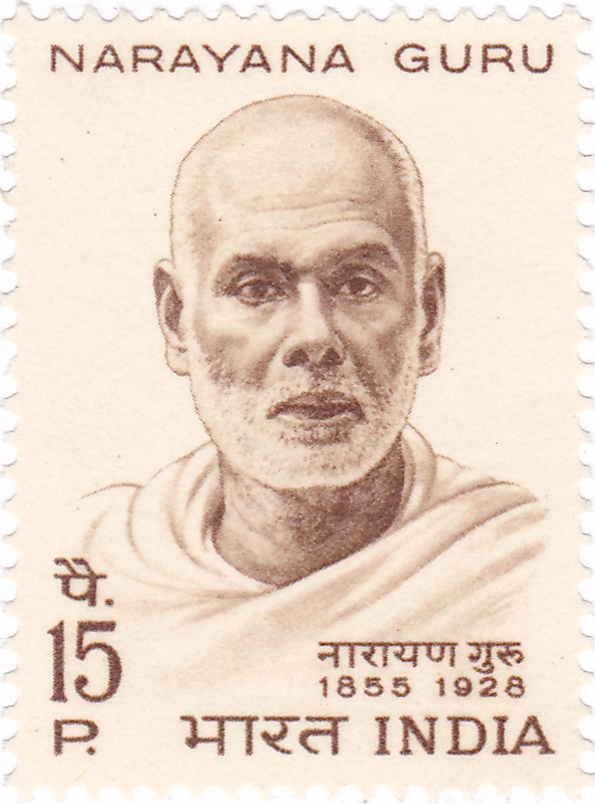
Guru 1967 stamp of India

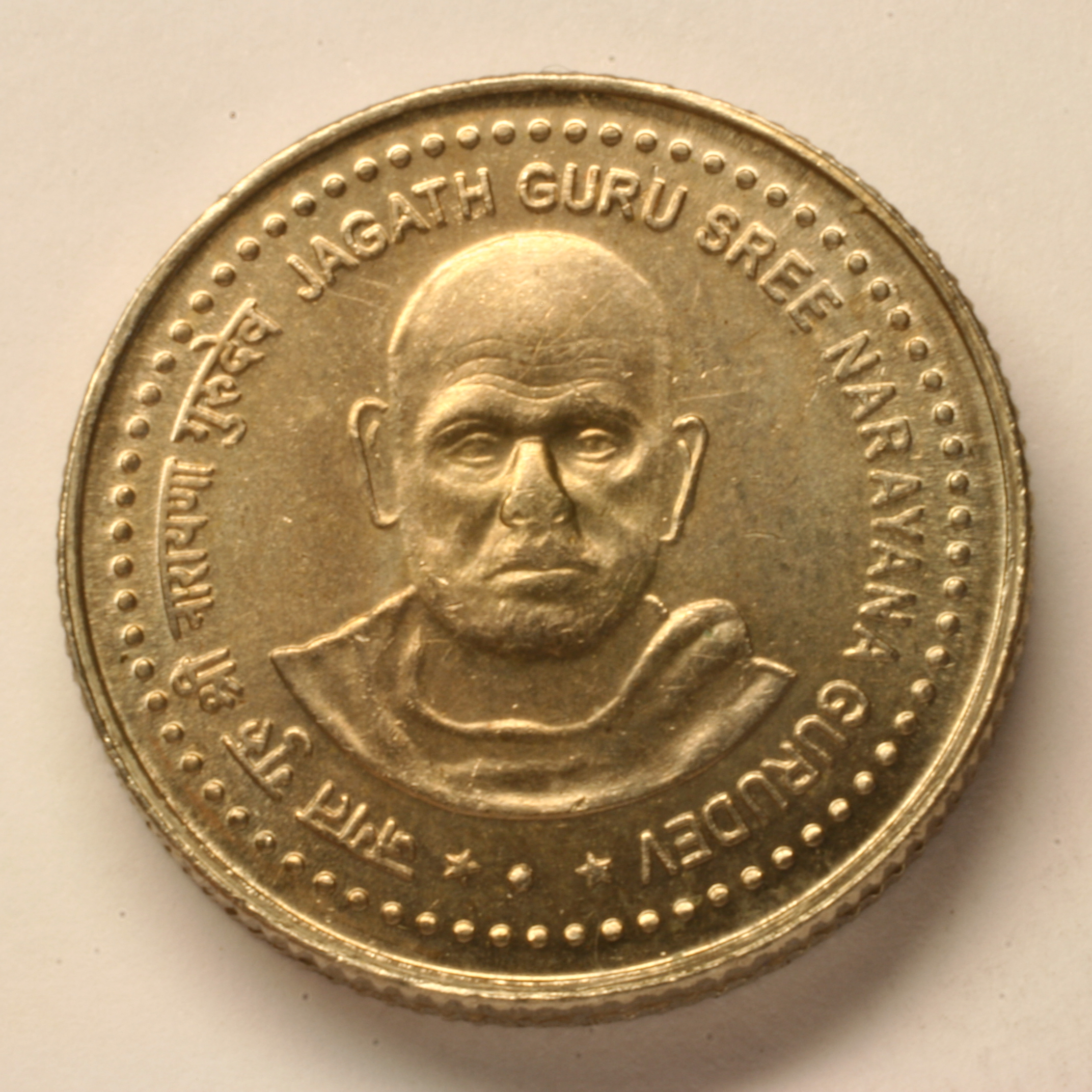
₹5 Coin

In 1916, Ramana Maharshi hosted Narayana Guru at his Tiruvannamalai ashram when Guru was returning from a trip to Kancheepuram where Swami Govindananda, a disciple of Guru, had established the Sree Narayana Seva Ashram. Rabindranath Tagore met Narayana Guru at the latter's ashram in Sivagiri in November 1922. Tagore later said of Narayana Guru that, "I have never come across one who is spiritually greater than Swami Narayana Guru or a person who is at par with him in spiritual attainment." Three years later, Mahatma Gandhi visited Guru during his 1925 trip to Kerala to participate in the Vaikom Satyagraha after which the Indian independence movement leader stated "it was a great privilege in his life to have the darshan of an esteemed sage like Narayana Guru."

On 21 August 1967, Narayana Guru was commemorated on an Indian postage stamp of denomination 15 nP. Another commemorative stamp on him was issued by Sri Lanka Post on 4 September 2009. The Reserve Bank of India and Security Printing and Minting Corporation of India issued two sets of commemorative coins depicting Guru's image, each valued at ₹5 and ₹100 respectively, on the occasion of his 150th birth anniversary.

The first of the several statues of Narayana Guru was erected at Jagannath Temple, Thalassery in 1927 while he was still alive. His statues are seen in many places in Kerala which include a 24 feet statue at Kaithamukku in Thiruvananthapuram. The Government of Kerala observes his birthday, the Sri Narayana Jayanthi, and the date of his death, Sree Narayana Guru Samadhi as public holidays.

== In popular media ==
The life of Narayana Guru has been portrayed in a number of movies starting with the 1986 film Sree Narayana Guru, made by award-winning director P. A. Backer. Swamy Sreenarayana Guru, an Indian Malayalam-language film directed by Krishnaswamy, released the same year. Almost a decade and a half later, R. Sukumaran made a film on the life of Guru, titled Yugapurushan, in 2010 with Thalaivasal Vijay playing the role of Guru and the film also featured Mammootty and Navya Nair. Brahmashri Narayana Guru Swamy is a Tulu film made in 2014 by Rajashekar Kotian on Guru's life and the film was the 50th film made in the language. His life during the eight years he spent at Maruthwamala (also known as Marunnumamala) has been adapted into a docufiction, titled Marunnumamala and the film was released by Pinarayi Vijayan, the chief minister of Kerala on 9 August 2016. (Note: Marunnumamala – a docufiction in Malayalam on YouTube)

In 2016, Kerala High court observed that the statue of Narayana Guru cannot be treated as a Hindu deity.

== Works ==
=== In Malayalam ===
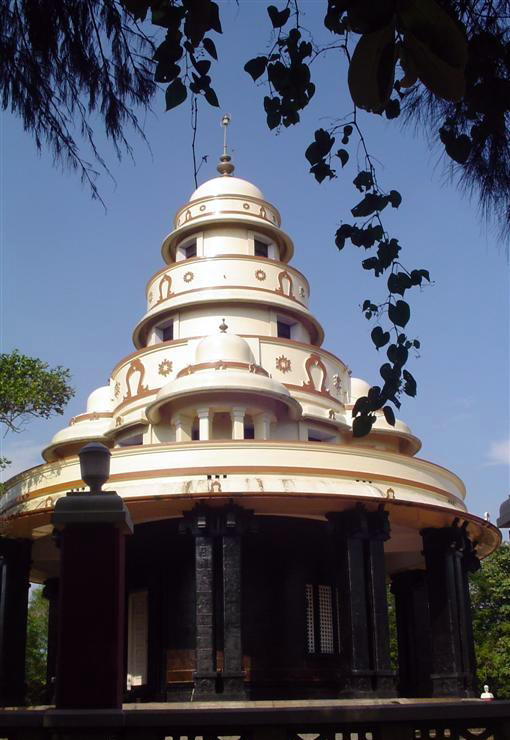
Guru's tomb in Sivagiri, Kerala

- Swanubavageethi
- Aathmopadesh Shathakam
- Adwaitha deepika
- Arivu
- Narayana Guru (1988). Daivadasakam. Trivandrum: Narayana Gurukula.
- Narayana Guru; Bhāskaran, Ti (1981). Śivaśatakaṃ (in Malayalam). Tiruvanantapuram]; Kōṭṭayaṃ: N.M. Sajee Bhaskaran; Vitaraṇaṃ, Nāṣanal Bukst̲āḷ. OCLC 13027019.
- Jeevakarunya Panchakam
- Anukamba Dasakam
- Jathi Nirnayam
- Jathi Lakshanam
- Chijjada Chinthanam
- Daiva vichinthanam – 1 & 2
- Athma Vilasam
- Narayana Guru; Bhaskaran T (1981). Shivasathakam. Sajee Bhaskaran.
- Kolatheereshastavam
- Bhadrakaalyashtakam
- Gajendra moksham vanchipattu
- Ottapadyangal
- Sree Krishnana Darsanam
- Mangalasamsakal
- Narayana Guru (1987). Subrahmanya keerthanam. Varkala: Narayana Gurukula.
- Subramanya Ashtakam
- Sadasiva Darsanam
- Samasya
- Swanubhava Geethi
- Indrya Vairagyam
- Narayana Guru (1976). Nyayadarsanam. Varkala: Narayana Gurukula.
- Narayana Guru (1988). Prapanchasudhidasakam anubhoothidasakam. Varkkala: Narayana Gurukula.
- Narayana Guru (2003). Kalinatakam (2nd ed.). Varkkala: Narayanagurukulam.
- Narayana Guru, Sree (1993). Baahuleyaashtakam. Varkala: Narayana Gurukulam.
- Narayana Guru (1985). Sree Narayana Guruvinte Sampoorna Kruthikal (in Malayalam). Calicut: Mathrubhumi.
- Narayana Guru; Bālakr̥ṣṇan Nāyar, G (1972). Kuṇdalini-pāṭṭu' (in Malayalam). Trivandrum: Sree Narayana Publishing House. OCLC 499830611.
- Narayana Guru; Narayana Prasad; Narayana Gurukula (2003). Kāḷināṭakaṃ. Varkkala: Nārāyaṇagurukulaṃ. OCLC 58526535.

=== In Sanskrit ===
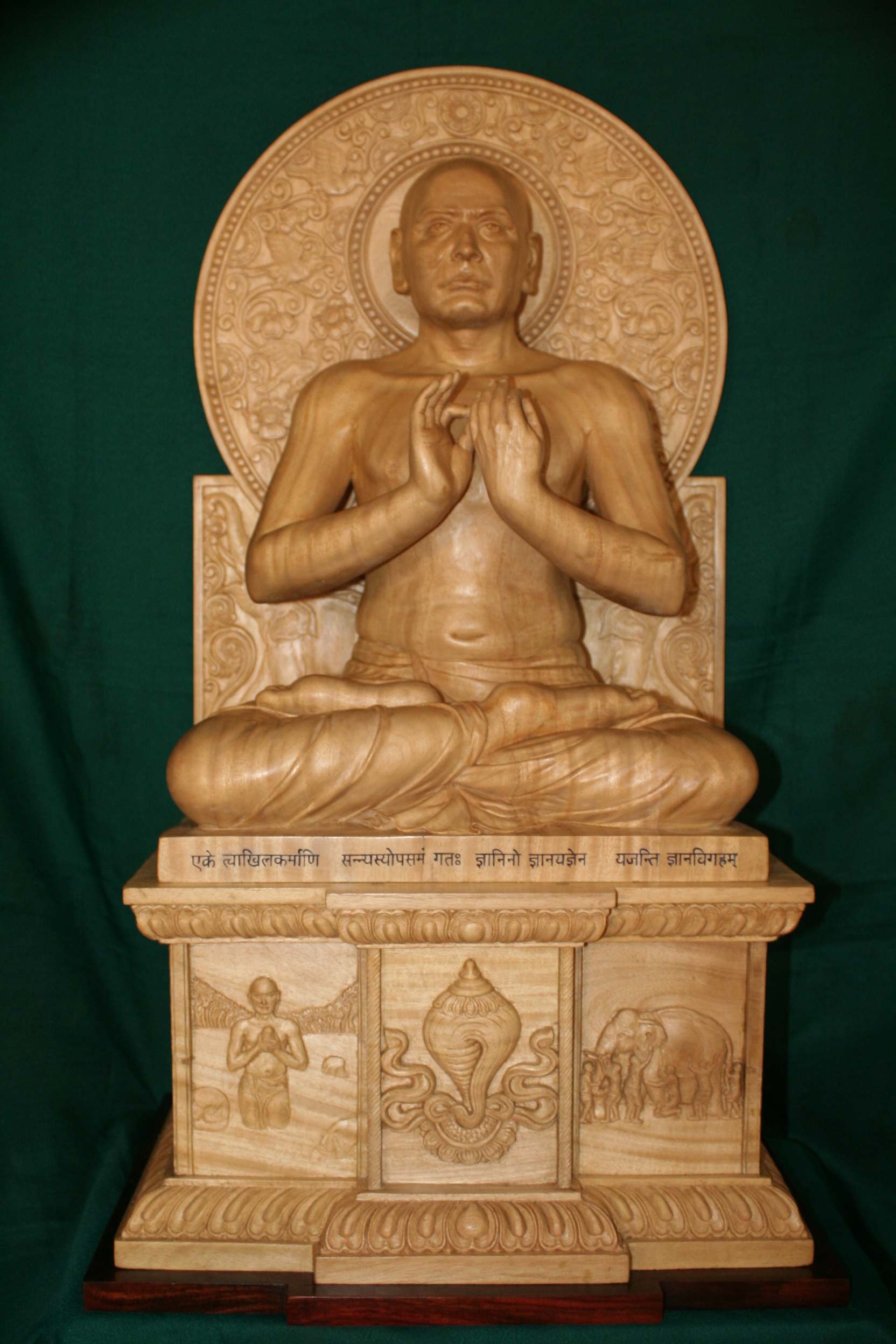
The first Jnana Vigraham of Guru

- Narayana Guru (2004). Darsanamaala. Varkkala: Narayana Gurukula.
- Narayana Guru (1985). Brahmavidyapanjakam. Varkkala: Narayana Gurukulam.
- Narayana Guru; Śāstrī, Harihara (1998). Darśanamālā. Naī Dillī: Ḍī. Ke. Priṇṭavarlḍa. ISBN 9788124601099. OCLC 671596309.
- Nirvruthi Panchakam
- Slokathrayi
- Vedantha Suthram
- Homa Manthram
- Municharya Panchakam
- Asramam
- Dharmam
- Charama Slokangal
- Homa Mantram
- Chidambarashtakam
- Guhashtakam
- Bhadrakaliashtakam
- Vinayaka Ashtakam
- Sree Vasudeva Ashtakam
- Janani Navaratna Manjari

=== In Tamil ===
- Thevarappathinkangal

=== Translations ===
- Thirukural
- Isavasyo Upanishad
- Ozhivil Odukkam

=== Translations of Guru's works into other languages ===
- Narayana Guru (2007). Garland of visions: Darśanamālā of Narayana Guru. Translated by Narayana Prasad. New Delhi: D.K. Printworld. ISBN 9788124603918. OCLC 167576536.
- Nataraja Guru; Narayana Guru (2001). An integrated science of the absolute: based on the Darśana mālā (Garland of visions) of Narayana Guru. New Delhi: D.K. Printworld. ISBN 9788124601846. OCLC 50756278.
- Narayana Guru (2009). Shorter philosophical poems of Narayana Guru: Brahmavidyā pañcakam, Advaita dīpikā, Aṛivu, Homa mantram, Daiva daśakam. Translated by Narayana Prasad. New Delhi: D.K. Printworld. ISBN 9788124605158. OCLC 653807175.
- Narayana Guru (1997). The Vedānta-sūtras of Nārāyaṇa Guru: with an English translation of the original Sanskrit and commentary. Translated by Narayana Prasad. New Delhi: D.K. Printworld. ISBN 9788124600856. OCLC 37282506.
- Narayana Guru (1977). Life divine and spiritual values. Bangalore: Swami Sivananda Spiritual Centre. OCLC 615117867. Copies can be had from Satsangha Seva Samithi.
- Narayana Guru (1994). The song of the self: a new translation of atmopadesasatakam (one hundred verses of self-instruction). Translated by Sreenivasan, K. Thiruva-nanthapuram, Kerala: Jayasree Publications. OCLC 222527764.
- Narayana Guru (1969). One hundred verses of self-instruction (Atmopadesasatakam). Translated by Nataraja Guru. Varkala, Kerala: Gurukula Pub. House. OCLC 695387.
- Narayana Guru (2007). Nārāyaṇasmr̥tiḥ (in Sanskrit). Translated by Atmananda; Narayana Prasad. New Delhi: D.K. Printworld. ISBN 9788124603925. OCLC 733026527.
- Narayana Guru (1982). Vinayakashtakam: eight verses in praise of Vināyaka. Translated by Nityacaitanya Yati. Varkala: Narayana Gurukula. OCLC 863337667.
- Narayana Guru (1969). One hundred verses of self-instruction. OCLC 606239200.

== Death ==
Narayana Guru died at Sivagiri, Kerala. The cause of death was recorded as indigestion and prostate inflammation. He had told all the great physicians and disciples of that time who came to treat him that he was approaching samadhi and that the ashram should be well looked after and that everyone should live as good people. The special public meeting of the SNDP meeting held at Kottayam was the last public ceremony attended by Narayana Guru.

In 1927, naturopathy was carried out in Mangatukodi and Kandachira on the banks of Ashtamudikayal along with Pazhavila Chattambiasan. He was bedridden for a long time suffering from senile disease but was treated by many doctors but could not cure the disease completely. He died during meditation in the presence of devotees on 20 September 1928 (Malayalam year: 1104 Kanni 5). It was just three weeks after his 72nd birthday. The body was laid to rest in Sivagiri, Kerala Mathvalap. Today there is a hall with his statue.

== See also ==
- Ayyathan Gopalan
- Kallingal Madathil Rarichan Moopan
- Brahmananda Swami Sivayogi
- Mithavaadi Krishnan
- Sree Narayana Trust
- Temples consecrated by Narayana Guru
- Vagbhatananda
