= Sivagiri, Kerala =

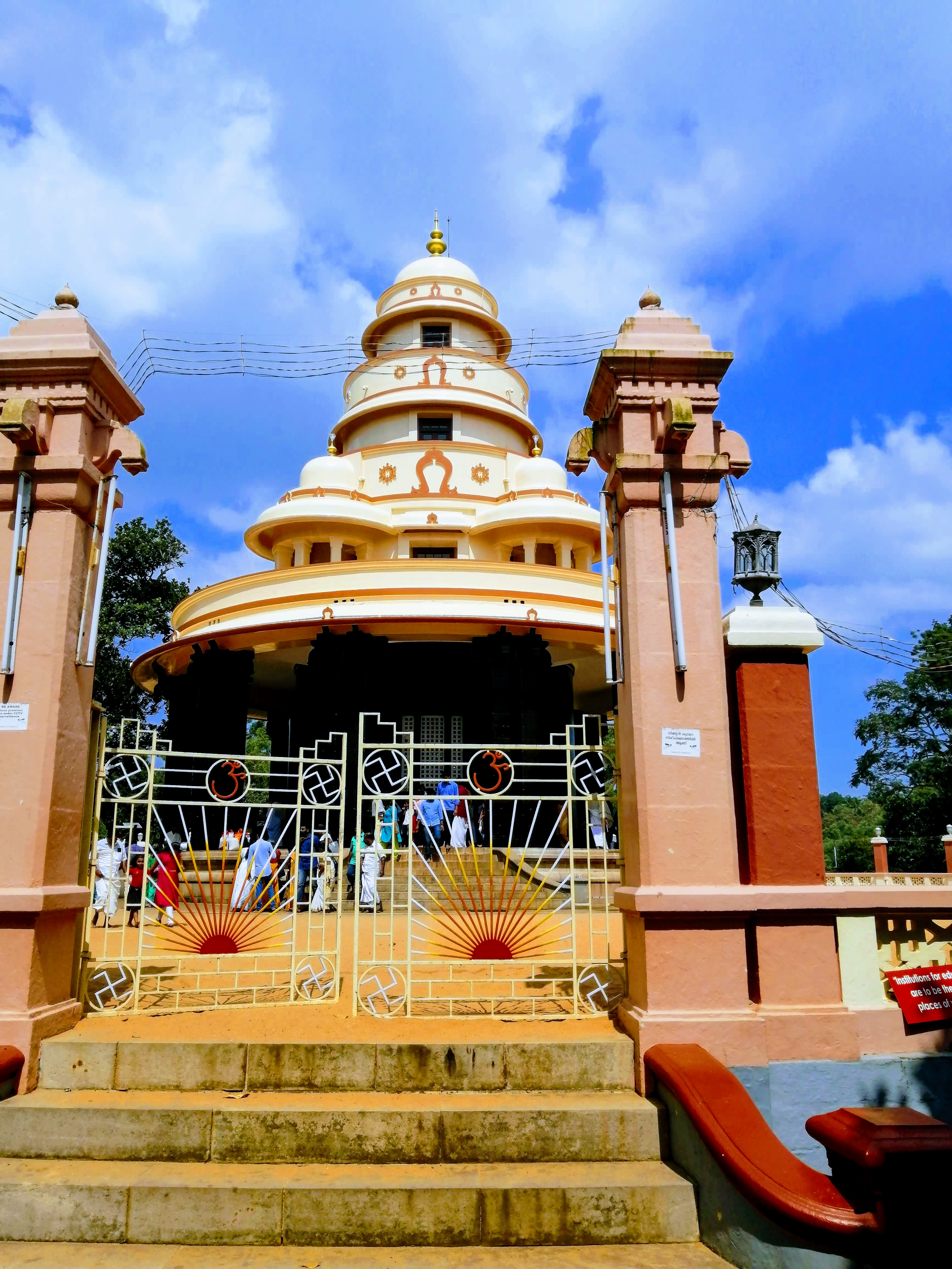
- varkala sivagiri captured by Aju
- Interactive map of Sivagiri, Kerala

Sivagiri Kaithakunnu
- Location in Kerala, India
- Coordinates: 8.739°N 76.732°E
- Country: India
- State: Kerala
- District: Thiruvananthapuram

Government
  - Type: Municipality
  - Body: Varkala Municipality

Languages
  - Official: Malayalam, English
- Time zone: UTC+5:30 (IST)
- PIN: 695141
- Telephone code: 0470
- Vehicle registration: KL-81
- Nearest city: Varkala
- Literacy: 100%
- Lok Sabha constituency: Attingal
- Civic agency: Varkala municipality

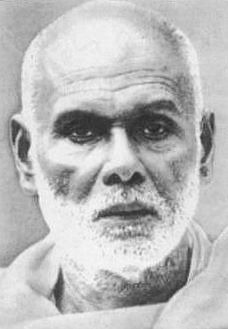
Sree Narayana Guru : Spiritual Guru, a prominent Social reformer in India

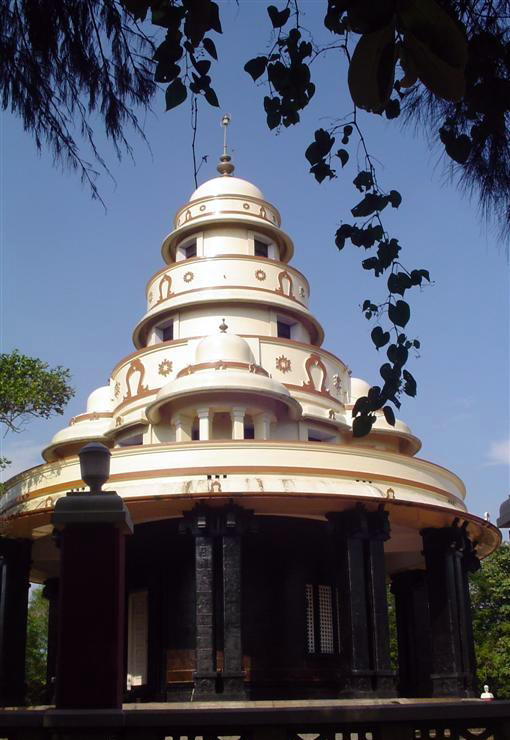

Sivagiri is an area in Varkala Municipality of Thiruvananthapuram district in Kerala. It is a pilgrimage centre of Varkala Town where the tomb, or samadhi, of Sree Narayana Guru is situated. It is a place where Guru built the Sarada Temple dedicated to Sarada Devi. The tomb is an attraction for thousands of devotees every year, especially during the Sivagiri Pilgrimage days (Sivagiri Theerthadanam) from 30 December to 1 January.

The Sivagiri Matha, built in 1904, is atop the Sivagiri hill in Varkala Town. This is also the headquarters of the Sree Narayana Dharma Sangham, an organisation of his disciples and saints, established by the Guru to propagate his concept of "One Caste, One Religion, One God". The Guru Deva Jayanti, the birthday of the Guru, and the samadhi day are celebrated in August and September respectively every year. Colourful processions, debates and seminars, public meetings, cultural shows, community feasts, group wedding and rituals mark the celebrations.

== Guru's initial days at Sivagiri ==
Gurudevan's association with Sivagiri in Varkala in south Kerala dates back to 1904. A lover of nature and places of natural beauty, Narayana Guru built a hermitage on top of the Sivagiri hill and stayed there, growing plants around it, and the once-solitary hill began to attract public attention.

At first, an elementary school was established there. A night school was also founded for the illiterate people from the marginalised communities. Many people came to Sivagiri to have a darshan of Gurudevan.

== Sarada Mutt ==
After travelling to many places in South India and Sri Lanka and establishing temples, he did the prathishta of the spiritual figure Sree Sarada at Sivagiri in April 1912. It is the most remarkable one among his consecration of temple deities. The foundation for it was laid in 1909. The same year he composed the poem "Janani Navaratna Manjari".

According to the Indian concept, the goddess Saraswati is the primary goddess of knowledge. Gurudevan called this temple, which is octagonal in shape, Sarada Mutt. Unlike in other temples, naivedyam (offering of food to the deity) or abhishekam (pouring oil, ghee and such on the idol) is not practiced in the temple. Devotees worship the goddess by reciting hymns. The idol of Saraswati seated on white lotus symbolizes knowledge blossoming on whiteness or purity.

Padmanabhan Palpu served as the president, and Kumaran Asan as secretary, for the Sarada Consecration Committee.

== Gurudevan's concept of the temple ==
In connection with Prathishta of goddess Sarada, grand conferences and festivals were conducted for four consecutive days. Sree Narayana Guru introduced original and novel perceptions about temples, departing from traditional ideas on the subject. He shunned tantric rituals. There is no similar temple in India. Here, he established an architecture that was simple and different. For the first time in India, a temple with windows and ventilation was devised. The Guru installed a deity which was traditionally symbolic and aesthetically perfect. The highest standards of hygiene were introduced to maintain the place as a model to other temples and temple worshipers. The opening of this temple was uniquely marked by the inspirational ceremony of guest of hymns in praise of the mother Sarada. The Guru himself wrote janani-navaratna Manjari, nine Gems in praise of the mother. It is not necessary to build temples in the old style by spending a lot of money he ordained. Further, he also advised not to spend money on festivals and fireworks.

In temples there should be spacious rooms where people can sit comfortably and take part in discourses. There must be schools attached to all temples. There should also be amenities attached to the temples to train children in various trades. The money that comes to the temples as donation must be spent in such a way that the poor people benefit from it. It is not desirable to make ponds near temples for the worshipers to take bath. It is not possible to keep the ponds always pure. Therefore, bathrooms are to be constructed with an arrangement of small pipes so that the water will fall from above the head. From these words we can clearly understand the progressive nature of Gurudevan's concept of the temple.

== Sivagiri pilgrimage ==
Sivagiri pilgrimage, now known as Sivagiri Theerthadanam, was conceived by Vallabhasseri Govindan Vaidyar and T K Kittan Writer. It was duly approved by Gurudevan in January 1928. The setting was SNDP's Nagambadam Shiva temple. It was 3pm, and Gurudevan was resting under a mango tree, when the two presented the concept of Sivagiri pilgrimage. Before giving it his blessings he set out the goals of such a pilgrimage. He said: "Let the pilgrims congregate at the beginning of the European New Year. It should be Dhanu 16-17 in Malayalam calendar. Let the pilgrims observe 10 days' self-purification according to Sri Buddha's principles of five purities (Pancha Dharma) - body, food, mind, word, deed."

He ruled that pilgrims could wear yellow clothes - the colour of the garments Sri Buddha wore. Let no one purchase yellow silk because we have recommended yellow garments. Not even new clothes are required on the pilgrimage. A pilgrim can dip a white garment in turmeric water and wear after drying. The pilgrimage should be conducted with simplicity and preferably be accompanied by the chanting of hymns. There should be no shouting and pilgrims should scrupulously avoid trappings of ostentation.

To Govindan Vaidyar and Kitten Writer Gurudevan counted on his fingers the goals of the pilgrimage, explaining how to achieve them. The goals were the promotion of education, cleanliness, devotion to god, organization, agriculture, trade, handicrafts and technical training.

Finally, it was decided to start the first pilgrimage from the village of Elavumthitta. The S N D P unit No.76 of Elavumthitta selected 5 youngsters for the pilgrimage, namely, P.K.Divakara Panicker, P.K.Kesavan, P.V.Raghavan, M.K.Raghavan, and S.Sankunni. All the 5 pilgrims wore bright yellow clothes, as suggested by Sree Narayana Guru. All the way to Sivagiri, they were reciting 'Swaathanthrya gadha' – written by the great poet Kumaranaasan. They were teased with the words 'Manjakkilikal' –meaning yellow birds. They never got provoked, with a smile they moved on. The dominant thought in their mind was their mission, to reach Sivagiri, a great responsibility bestowed on their shoulders by the Sreenarayana devotees. Their mission was a great success.

He advised them to organise a series of lectures on the themes with experts conducting them. The lectures should be listened to attentively. More importantly, the principles should be put into practice. Success must accompany efforts. Only then will the country and the people benefit. This must be the core purpose of Sivagiri pilgrimage.

== Festivals ==
Guru Jayanthi celebration at Gokaneswara Temple, Mangalore, Karnataka, India

The Sarada temple and mutt has now become a unique place of pilgrimage. The Sri Narayana Jayanthi, birthday of the Guru, and the Samadhi day are befittingly celebrated in August and September respectively every year. On these days colourful processions, seminars, public meetings, cultural shows, community feasts and special rituals are held. In the last week of December, devotees of Sree Narayana Guru, donned in yellow attire, stream to Sivagiri from different parts of Kerala and outside, in what may be called a pilgrimage of enlightenment. Seminars and discussions on various themes of modern life ranging from industrialisation to women's emancipation are held during the days of pilgrimage. The Mahasamadhi of Sree Narayana Guru also attracts a large number of devotees and tourists.

== See also ==
- List of Hindu temples in Kerala
