= Aruvippuram =

- village
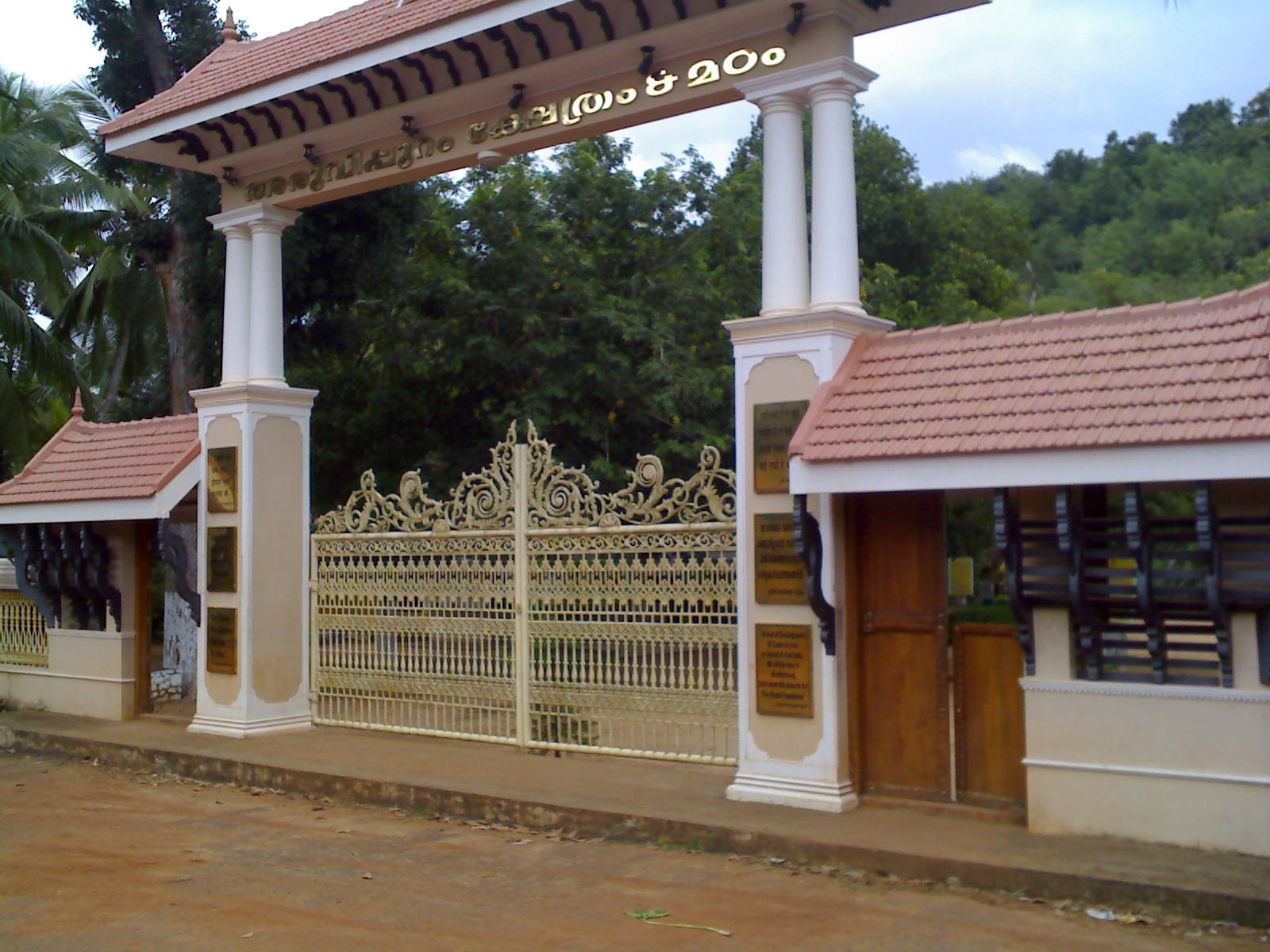
- Shiva temple Established by Sri Narayana Guru at Aruvippuram

- Location in Kerala, India Aruvippuram (India)
- Coordinates: 8.4219000°N 77.096750°E
- Country: India
- State: Kerala
- District: Thiruvananthapuram

Government
  - Body: Gram panchayat

Languages
  - Official: Malayalam, English
- Time zone: UTC+5:30 (IST)
- Vehicle registration: KL-

Aruvippuram is a village in the southern district of Thiruvananthapuram in Kerala, India. It is famous for the Siva temple established by Sri Narayana Guru. The Guru consecrated the Siva idol, the first non Brahmin to do so in Kerala society, in the year 1888. Aruvippuram Sivarathri is a very popular event attended by a large numbers of devotees and followers of Guru. Sivarathri also marks the anniversary of the Aruvippuram Siva temple. Koduthooki Mala is a rocky hill nearby the Aruvippuram Siva temple. There is a cave on top of this hill, where Guru used to visit for rest, solitariness and meditation tapas.

SNDP Yogam is formed at Aruvippuram, which was a historical event in Kerala history.
