= Sree Narayana Dharma Paripalana Yogam =

Indian charitable society

- Abbreviation: SNDP
- Formation: 15 May 1903
- Founder: Dr. Padmanabhan Palpu
- Type: Social equality promoting organisation
- Headquarters: Kollam
- Location: Kerala, India
- Official language: Malayalam
- Life time Chairman: Sree Narayana Guru
- Parent organization: Vavoottu Yogam
- Website: sndpyogam.co.in

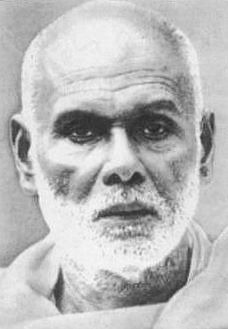
Narayana Guru

Sree Narayana Dharma Paripalana Yogam, commonly known as S.N.D.P. Yogam, is a foundational social service organisation in Kerala, India. Officially registered under the Companies Act on 15 May 1903, it was founded by Dr. Padmanabhan Palpu. The social reformer Sree Narayana Guru served as its first and lifelong chairman, while the poet Kumaranasan was its first secretary.

The establishment of the Yogam marked the first organised effort for social equality in Kerala and played a pivotal role in the state's renaissance. Its primary objectives were to propagate Guru's ideals, guide oppressed communities towards social and spiritual advancement, and establish educational institutions and monasteries. The organisation grew out of the Vavoottu Yogam, a committee managing the Aruvippuram temple founded by Guru.

Today, the SNDP Yogam has a significant presence in Kerala's social and political spheres. Its influence extends globally, with members and branches in the Gulf countries, the United States, the United Kingdom, Canada, and Australia.

== Sree Narayana Trust ==
The Sree Narayana Trust was founded by the SNDP Yogam to start, and manage educational, social, and economical institutions with the vision of Narayana Guru. Combined both the Yogam and the Trust present annual budgets of about ₹2,000,000,000 (INR 200 crore or US$24 million).

Currently, the organization runs several educational institutes, hospitals, and other institutions.

== Mission ==
The SNDP Yogam is based on the principles and philosophy of Narayana Guru. Guru devoted his life to working against the social and economical inequality, casteism, and superstitions in the Kerala society. The Yogam has the moral responsibility and the social duty to model the Sree Narayana dharmas.

== History ==
SNDP was founded in 1903 by Padmanabhan Palpu with the guidance and blessings of Narayana Guru. SNDP was the first organization to envisage Kerala as a whole.

Vavoottu Yogam expanded and formed an organization known as Aruvippuram Kshetra Yogam. The Aruvippuram Temple Society, known as Vavoottu Yogam emerged in 1888.

During the 1890s, there was an oppressive caste system in Kerala. Palpu started working towards ensuring the rights of the then identified backward communities. With the 1891 Malayali Memorial Revolt, he took the leadership of the then oppressed community named Ezhava, and attempted to begin an organization called Ezhava Sabha. In 1896, he created the organization's by-laws and published the law in Malayali, a newspaper published from Thankussery. He organized a few meetings at Paravur and Mayyanad, before the movement failed.

Aruvippuram

On 7 January 1903, a special meeting of Aruvippuram Kshetra Yogam was conducted. They decided to enlarge the organization to support the progress of all backward communities religiously and materially. Thus, on 15 May 1903, with Narayana Guru as its president, Aruvippuram Kshetra Yogam was registered as Aruvippuram Sree Narayana Dharma Paripalana Yogam according to the Indian Companies Act, No. 6, 1882.

The Sree Bhavaneeswara temple, dedicated to Shiva, was consecrated by Guru on 8 March 1916 (24 Kumbham 1091 M.E.). After the ceremony, he laid the foundation stone for the Lower Primary School under the SNDP.

== List of presidents ==
List of SNDP Yogam presidents
No	Name	Years
1	Narayana Guru	1903–1928
2	Madavan Vydyar	1929–1933
3	C. Krishnan	1933–1938
4	M. Govindan	1939–1940
5	K. Ayyappan	1940–1943
6	V. K. Panikkar	1943–1944
7	V. K. Velayudan	1944–1945
8	M. Govindan	1945–1951
9	P. N. Narayanan	1951–1953
10	K. Sukumaran	1953–1954
11	R. Sankar	1954–1956
12	V. G. Sukumaran	1956–1960
13	K. I. Velayudan	1960–1961
14	M. Achuthan	1961–1966
15	C. R. Kesavan Vydyar	1966–1970
16	Administrator rule	1970–1971
17	K. T. Achuthan	1971–1973
18	N. Sreenivasan	1973–1978
19	P. S. Velayudan	1978–1982
20	M. K. Ragavan	1982–1988
21	K. K. Viswanathan	1988–1992
22	K. G. Sreenivasa Panickar	1992
23	K. K. Rahulan	1992–1996
24	A. S. Prathapsingh	1996–1999
25	C. K. Vidhyasagar	1999–2006
26	K. Kamalasanan	2006
27	M. B. Sreekumar	2006–2007
28	M. N. Soman	2007–

== List of General Secretaries ==
The following is a chronological list of the General Secretaries of Sree Narayana Dharma Paripalana (SNDP) Yogam since its registration in 1903.

No.	Name	Tenure
1	Kumaran Asan	1903–1915
2	N. Krishnan	1915–1916
3	Kumaran Asan	1916–1919
4	N. Kumaran	1919–1927
5	C. V. Kunhiraman	1927–1929
6	M. Govindan	1929–1930
7	K. Narayanan	1930–1931
8	C. V. Kunhiraman	1931–1932
9	K. M. Keshavan	1932–1933
10	C. Kesavan	1933–1935
11	Thazhava Kesavan	1935–1936
12	V. K. Velayudhan	1936–1941
13	K. N. Kunju Krishnan	1941–1942
14	V. K. Velayudhan	1942–1944
15	R. Sankar	1944–1954
16	K. Karthikeyan	1954–1956
17	R. Sankar	1956–1957
18	K. R. Narayanan	1957–1961
19	K. M. Raghavan	1961–1970
20	Mankuzhi Madhavan	1971–1973
21	Prof. P. S. Velayudhan	1973–1978
22	P. S. Prathap Singh	1978–1982
23	K. Gopinadhan	1982–1985
24	A. S. Prathap Singh	1985–1992
25	K. Gopinadhan	1992–1996
26	Vellappally Natesan	1996–2026

== See also ==
- List of Ezhavas
- Sivagiri, Kerala
