= C. V. Kunhiraman =

Indian journalist and social reformer (1871–1949)

- Born: 6 February 1871; Mayyanad, Kollam, Kerala, India
- Died: 10 April 1949 (aged 78)
- Occupations: Social reformer; Journalist
- Known for: Kerala reformation movement; Kerala Kaumudi
- Spouse: Kunjikkavu
- Children: 3, including K. Sukumaran (son)
- Relatives: C. Kesavan (son-in-law)

C. V. Kunhiraman (6 February 1871 – 10 April 1949) was an Indian social reformer, journalist and the founder of Kerala Kaumudi daily. A follower of Sree Narayana Guru, Kunhiraman was the author of a number of books covering the genres of novels, short story, poetry, biographies and essays. He was one of the leaders involved in the Vaikom Satyagraha of Reformation movement in Kerala which led to the Temple Entry Proclamation.

== Biography ==
Kunhiraman was born on 6 February 1871 at Mayyanad in Kollam district of the south Indian state of Kerala to Vasudevan of Njarakkal house, an astrologer and magician, and Kunjichali of Kallumpurathu house. After early education at Mayyanad L. M. S. School, he joined the Government High School, Kollam but had to discontinue studies after 8th standard and started his career at the Forest department in 1893 as a clerk during which time he resumed his studies to pass the teachers' examination to become a teacher in 1894 at Vellamanal School, Mayyanad. He taught at a number of schools at Kollam, Kadakkavoor, Kayikkara and Paravur before returning to Vellamanal school by which time he had passed the lawyers' examination and resigned from the school in 1913 to take up the career of a lawyer by practising at the Magistrate Court at Paravur. In between, he founded Kerala Kaumudi daily in 1911 and later, he shifted his base to Kollam, after quitting his career as a lawyer, resuscitated Kerala Kaumudi daily in 1920 with the assistance of his son, K. Sukumaran. His early journalistic articles were published in Sujananadini, run by Paravoor Kesavan Asan, where he became a sub-editor in due course and wrote poems and articles, mostly on social affairs.

Kunhiraman was married to Kunjikkavu and the couple had two sons, K. Sukumaran and K. Damodaran and a daughter, Vasanthi, who was married to C. Kesavan, former chief minister of Travancore-Cochin. He died on 10 April 1949 at the age of 78.

== Legacy ==
=== Kerala Kaumudi ===
To launch a newspaper of his own was his all-time dream. In 1911, Kunhiraman launched Kerala Kaumudi as a weekly newspaper. He was the proprietor, editor, printer, publisher and even the proofreader. Started in 1911, in Mayyanad, it had grown over the years as one of the most influential dailies in Malayalam with nine editions from Thiruvananthapuram, Kollam, Alappuzha, Pathanamthitta, Kottayam, Kochi, Thrissur, Kozhikode and Kannur.

=== Other journalistic contributions ===
Kunhiraman was also the editor of Malayalarajyam, Navajeevan, Kathamalika, Yukthivadi, Navasakthi and Vivekodayam. He had the rare distinction in Malayalam journalism being the founder of Kerala Kaumudi and founder editor of Malayalarajyam. He had been on the editorial board of Malayalarajyam, Navajeevan, Navasakthi, Malayala Manorama, Bhashaposhini, Kathamalika, Vivekodayam and Yukthivadi.

=== Literary contributions ===
Kunhiraman's oeuvre comprises 14 books, covering the genres of novel, short story, poetry, biography and other works including the condensed versions of Mahabharata and Ramayana, of which Valmiki Ramayanam, a prose rendering of the epic, was his first work to come out in print, in 1901, followed by Vyasabharatam, Panchavadi and other works. This include four novels, a short story anthropology, a book of poetry and his reminiscences of Kumaran Asan.

=== Social activities ===
Kunhiraman was a close associate of Narayana Guru and an active participant in the intellectual and social activities of Sivagiri Mutt. He was one of the leaders of the Vaikom Satyagraha, a social protest against untouchability, centred around the Shiva temple at Vaikom during 1924–25. He continued to be a part of the agitation which resulted in the Temple Entry Proclamation of 1936. He was a part of the Sree Narayana Dharma Paripalana Yogam and served as its general secretary during 1928–29 and 1931–32. He started a school for low caste Hindus at Vellamanal, Mayyanad, Quilon and became its headmaster. He was also a member of the Sree Moolam Popular Assembly.

== Honours ==
C. V. Kunhiraman Foundation, an eponymous organisation which had O. N. V. Kurup as the founder chairman, has instituted an annual award, C. V. Kunhiraman Literary Award, to recognise excellence in Malayalam literature, and M. Sukumaran, the writer, and Sugathakumari, the noted poet, feature among the recipients of the award which carries a purse of ₹ 10,001, a citation and a statuette designed by noted artist B. D. Dathan.

== Bibliography ==
- Oru Noottandinu Munpu (short stories)
- Shree karthikodayam (poetry)
- Panchavadi (novel)
- Ragaparinamam (novel)
- Sreekovil (novel)
- Somanathan (novel)
- Njan (memoirs)
- Asan Smaranakal (biography)
- Valmiki Ramayanam (condensed prose)
- Vysabharatham (condensed prose)
- Sree Narayana Smruthi (reminiscences)
- Thiruvithamkoor Ezhava Rashtriya Mahasabha Adhyaksha Prasangam (speech)
- Unniyarcha, Oru Pdanam (essay)
- Chekavar (essay)
- Radharani (Novel)

== See also ==
- List of Malayalam-language authors by category
- List of Malayalam-language authors
- Ayyathan Gopalan

=== Other social reformers of Kerala ===
- Sree Narayana Guru
- Dr. Palpu
- Kumaranasan
- Rao Sahib Dr. Ayyathan Gopalan
- Brahmananda Swami Sivayogi
- Vaghbhatananda
- Mithavaadi Krishnan
- Moorkoth Kumaran
- Ayyankali
- Ayya Vaikundar
- Pandit Karuppan
