= Ayyavu Swamikal =

Indian spiritualist and social reformer

Sivarajayogi Thaikkad Ayya Swamikal

Personal life
- Born: Subbarayan; 1814 Nakalapuram, Now part of Tamil Nadu
- Died: 20 July 1909 (aged 94-95) Trivandrum, Kingdom of Travancore
- Parents: Muthukumaran (father); Rugmini Ammal (mother)
- Notable work(s): Brahmotharakandom, Hanuman Paamalai, Ulloor Amarntha Guhan etc

Religious life
- Religion: Hinduism
- Founder of: Saiva Prakasha Sabha
- Philosophy: Advaita, Siva Raja Yoga

Religious career
- Disciples: Spiritual masters and reformers disciples like Chattampi Swami, Narayana Guru, Makkidi Labba, Peermuhammed, Pett Fernadaz, social reformers like Ayyankali, men of Letters like Kerala Varma Valiya Koil Thampuran, A. R. Rajaraja Varma, Painters like Raja Ravi Varma, Musicians like Padmanabhan Vaidyan.

M. Subbaraya Panicker (born 1814 – 20 July 1909), better known as Thycaud Ayyavu Swamikal was a spiritualist and social reformer. He was one of the earliest to challenge caste customs in Kerala during a period when caste restrictions and untouchability were at their peak. Ayya Swamikal introduced Panthibhojanam or inter-dining in 19th-century Kerala. He was the guru of reformers and leaders such as Chattampi Swamikal, Sree Narayana Guru, and Ayyankali.

== Biography ==
Ayyavu Swamikal was born in 1814 in Nakalapuram, Tamil Nadu. His original name was Subharayan. His parents were Mutthukumaran and Rugmini Ammal. His father and grandfather, Sri Hrishikesan, were scholars and experts in yoga and migrated to Tamil Nadu from Pampumkadu in Malabar during Tipu Sultan's aggression.

At the age of twelve, Subharayan received spiritual initiation from two Tamil saints, Sachidananda Maharaj and Sri Chitti Paradeshi, who used to visit his father. They informed his family that he had a special assignment in life: he was destined to serve humanity in another place, and when the time was right, they would come to take him and prepare him to fulfill his duty. These avadhutas were said to be connected to great siddhas from Tamil Nadu living in the Himalayas who knew the science of immortality.

When he was sixteen, the two siddhas took him with them to Palani, where he learned advanced yoga. He traveled with them to Burma, Singapore, Penang, and Africa, meeting teachers of various religions and saints along the way. During his travels, Subharayan mastered English and acquired proficiency in Siddha medicine and alchemy.

At the age of nineteen, he was sent back home with instructions to look after his parents and family. At home, he continued his worship of the Goddess and yogic practices, often entering a state of Samadhi. His biographers and disciples state that by this time, he had acquired the Ashta siddhis, or divine powers, including the ability of astral travel. Occasionally, he visited Pazhani, Chennai, and other religious sites as part of pilgrimages and to participate in scholarly discussions.

He also began writing and composed Brahmothara Khandam and Pazhani Vaibhavam. At the age of twenty-seven, following the advice of his gurus, he visited the Kodungalloor Devi Temple in Kerala. It is said that his devotion was so profound and his prayers so powerful that when he recited the keerthans, the temple bells rang by themselves, and the doors opened to give him darshan.

In a dream, the Goddess told him that she would appear before him in Trivandrum, so he traveled there during the reign of Maharaja Swathi Tirunal. The king learned of his scholarship and expertise in Sivaraja Yoga and invited him to the palace. After meeting Subbarayan, the Maharajah decided to become his disciple.

One day, while a family gathering related to a marriage was taking place at the house where he was staying, a very old, lean woman told him that someone from his village would come to meet him and advised him to go to the nearby traveler’s shed that night. The Goddess gave him darshan at that traveler’s shed that evening. Later, the Thycaud Devi Temple was constructed at this site. Before long, he returned to Tamil Nadu.

Within a few months, his father left for Kashi, and the entire responsibility for the family fell on his shoulders. He started a business to support them and, following his guru's advice, Subbarayan got married. He delivered spiritual discourses in Chennai and, as part of his business, supplied goods to a military camp in Chennai. There, he came into contact with a British official, Mr. McGregor. McGregor, who was interested in Indian religion, language, and culture, became fond of the English-speaking Tamil villager and established a friendship with him, eventually becoming his student.

During the reign of Maharaja Ayilyam Thirunal, McGregor was appointed as the Resident of Travancore. When the position of Manager for the Residency was available, he appointed Subbarayan as the Manager of the Residency in Thycaud in 1873. This post was one of the highest-ranking positions that the British allowed natives to hold, and people respectfully called him "Superintend Ayyavu." The term "Ayyavu" means a respectable or venerable person. As people came to recognize his yogic powers and scholarship, the name evolved from Superintend Ayyavu to Ayyavu Swami. Swami maintained strict discipline and was extremely punctual in his work.

Ayyavu used to deliver lectures on Bhakthi, Yoga and Vedanta in Jnanaprajagaram; where the leading literary, social and spiritual personalities in and around Trivandrum used assemble discuss and deliver lectures and discourses. He in association with Manonmaniam Sundaram Pillai, founded the Saiva Prakasha Sabha of Trivandrum. He also used to deliver spiritual discourses at the Ashtapathana Sabha in Chennai.

He already knew that he had to permanently withdraw from the material world and enter into Samadhi on that day. When the King learned about his impending Samadhi, he wanted to provide a place for it near the palace and construct a temple there. However, Ayyavu insisted that his Samadhi should be at the Thycaud cremation ground and that it should be a very simple and small structure. Ayyavu Swami attained Samadhi on 20 July 1909. In 1943, a Shivalinga was installed over the Samadhi site of Ayyavu Swami in Thycaud. The temple was later improved under the patronage of Maharaja Sri Chithira Thirunal, the last king of Travancore. It is now known as Thycaud Siva Temple.

== Philosophy ==
Ayyavu Swamikal was an adept in Siva Raja Yoga, an ancient technique practiced by Tamil Saiva Yogis such as Agasthyar, Bhogar, and their lineage. He was one of the great teachers of Siva Raja Yoga in modern times and belonged to the line of Tamil Siddhas, including Agasthyar, Bogar, Tirumular, Tirujnana Sambhandhar, and Manicka Vachakar. His disciples, including Chattampi Swami, Narayana Guru, Swayam Prakasini Amma, and others, continued this lineage.

He taught his disciples the principles of Advaita and emphasized the practice of one God, one religion, and one caste. He proclaimed, "Intha Ulakathile Ore Oru Matham, Ore Oru Jathy, Ore Oru Kadavul Than" (One caste, one religion, one God in this world). This teaching influenced Chattampi Swami and Narayana Guru. Guru translated this doctrine into Malayalam as "Oru jathy, oru matham, oru daivam manushyanu " which gained widespread appeal and helped to reduce caste differences in the minds of the people of Kerala.

The movements initiated by Ayyavu Swamikal and his disciples were grounded in Humanism, Rationalism, and Democracy based on universal love, rather than following the European models of Renaissance or Reformation.

== Works ==
Ayyavu wrote several books on Bhakti, Jnana, and Yoga in Sanskrit, Tamil, and Malayalam. Some of these works were later published by his disciples. The works that are identified as his include:

- Brahmotharakandom
- Pazhanidaivam
- Ramayanam Pattu
- Ujjaini Mahakali Pancharatnam
- Thiruvarur Murukan
- Kumara Kovil Kuravan
- Ulloor Amarntha Guhan
- Ramayanam Sundarakandom
- Hanuman Paamalai
- Ente Kasiyathra
- Pazhani vaibhavam

== Disciples ==
Ayyavu Swamikal played a crucial role in shaping the personalities of many spiritual, cultural, and social leaders in erstwhile Travancore during the late nineteenth and early twentieth centuries. He demonstrated through his own life that the realization of the Supreme Self is achievable even for ordinary people by practicing Siva Raja Yoga and Hatha Yoga. The significance of his teachings lies in the fact that realization is possible while leading a family life and fulfilling worldly duties.

Among his disciples were notable figures such as Chattampi Swami and Narayana Guru, who contributed significantly to the modernization of Kerala. Ayyavu Swami had about fifty disciples from diverse fields and castes, ranging from palace residents to those living in huts, including Nambuthiries, Nairs, Ezhavas, Nadars, princesses, administrators, doctors, engineers, Muslims, Christians, and Hindus. The following are some of his important disciples:

- Spiritual Masters and Reformers- Hindu: Chattampi Swami, Narayana Guru, Swayamprakasa Yogini Amma (Kulathoor), Kollathamma. Muslim: Makkadi Labba, Thakkala Peermuhammad. Christian: Petta Fernandez.
- Social and Political Leaders: Ayyankali.
- Kings, Administrators: Maharaja Swathi Thirunal, Mc Gregor (British Resident), Surya Narayana Iyer, Muthukumara Swami Pillai, Vailur Rayasam Madhavan Pillai and Periya Perumal Pillai, Sundaram Iyyenkar (Peshkars/administrators).
- Artists and men of Letters: Raja Ravi Varma (Painter), Kerala Varma Koithampuran, and A. R. Rajaraja Varma (Literature).
- Padmanbhan Vaidyan (Musician).

== Predictions ==
Ayyaguru Swamikal was an accomplished astrologer and possessed the siddhi to predict future events. His predictions included that the younger Maharani's son would become the last Maharaja, North India would eventually separate, Ayyankali would be appointed to a participative administrative body to help the downtrodden, and the date of his own Samadhi. All these predictions came true.

Ayyankali was nominated to the Sri Moolam Assembly and honored by the rulers, and his statue was later unveiled by Prime Minister Indira Gandhi. Maharaja Chithira Tirunal became the last King of Travancore, as predicted. Swami also attained Samadhi on the date he had forecasted. Additionally, India was divided into India and Pakistan about fifty years after his prediction.

== See also (Social reformers of Kerala) ==
- Sree Narayana Guru
- Dr. Palpu
- Kumaranasan
- Rao Sahib Dr. Ayyathan Gopalan
- Brahmananda Swami Sivayogi
- Vaghbhatananda
- Mithavaadi Krishnan
- Moorkoth Kumaran
- Ayyankali
- Chattampi Swamikal
- Ayya Vaikundar
- Pandit Karuppan
