= Kerala reformation movement =

Socio-cultural movement in Kerala

The reformation movement in Kerala refers to a socio-cultural shift that began in the late 19th century, resulting in significant transformations in the social fabric of the southern Indian state of Kerala.

== Background ==
The foundations of social change in Kerala can be traced back to the 16th century. The emergence of the Bhakti movement and the development of the modern Malayalam language and the influence of figures like Thunchaththu Ezhuthachan led to the breaking of Brahmin dominance over literature and knowledge.

The arrival of European powers, including the Portuguese, Dutch, and English, played a significant role as catalysts for these changes. The arrival of missionaries from Europe contributed to the establishment of educational institutions in Kerala.

The political landscape of Kerala underwent significant changes with the establishment of centralized monarchies in Travancore and Cochin, leading to the decline of the feudal order. The Mysorean invasion of Kerala (1766–1792) further disrupted the existing caste hierarchy. Although the Mysoreans attempted to establish an Islamic state in Malabar, their advances were ultimately thwarted by the British.

Unlike the four-fold varna division seen in other parts of India, Kerala's social hierarchy was based on caste. The Malayali Brahmins occupied the top priestly class. Apart from the Hindu Brahmins, all other castes, were considered lower in hierarchy. These castes had to abide untouchability and ritualistic pollution norms enforced by the upper castes. Some castes like Nair were exploited by Namboothiri Brahmins as their servants and through exploitative relationships. Nairs were not allowed access to education by the Namboothiri community. Though the Namboothiris held the highest position in Kerala society from the 12th to the 20th century, their women were exploited by Namboothiri men. This included child marriages in which young girls were married to very old Namboothiri men, and the confinement of women within their homes, denying them freedom to go outside.

Prominent reformist leaders such as Narayana Guru and Ayyankali hailed from castes that were deemed lower in the social hierarchy of ancient Kerala. Consequently, leaders like Guru and Ayyankali focused on the abolition of the caste system rather than its reformation.

The winds of reformation were set in by the Syrian Christian priest (kathanar) St. Kuriakose Elias Chavara. The first Sanskrit schools for the lower caste Hindus were set up by Chavara in 1846. The revolutionary concept of a school along with every church (palliyum pallikoodavum) was also implemented by Chavara. He also initiated the practice of a mid-day meal scheme in schools. In contrast to northern India, the reformation in Kerala was driven by the lower castes.

== Leaders ==
Prominent leaders of Kerala reformation include :

- Kuriakose Elias Chavara
- Narayana Guru
- Chattampi Swamikal
- Ayyankali
- Sahodaran Ayyappan
- Padmanabhan Palpu
- Kumaran Asan
- Mannath Padmanabhan
- Ayyathan Gopalan
- Brahmananda Swami Sivayogi
- Vagbhatananda
- Nitya Chaitanya Yati
- Nataraja Guru
- VT Bhattathiripad
- C. V. Kunhiraman
- Sayyid Sanaullah Makti Tangal
- Vakkom Moulavi
- Pandit Karuppan
- Kurumban Daivathan
- Kavarikulam Kandan Kumaran
- Poykayil Yohannan
- Pampady Joseph
- Mithavaadi krishnan

== Major events ==
1. Channar revolt
2. Consecration at Aruvippuram
3. Formation of Sree Narayana Dharma Paripalana Yogam
4. Villuvandi Samaram
5. Kallumala Samaram
6. Education agitation by Mahatma Ayyankali
7. Vaikom Satyagraha
8. Gurvayoor Satyagraha

== See also ==
- Caste system in Kerala
