= Chattampi Swamikal =

Social reformer in Kerala

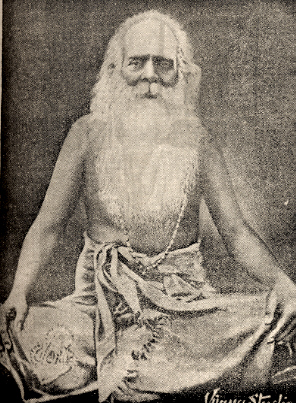

Personal life
- Born: Ayyappan; 25 August 1853 Kannammoola, Travancore (present day Thiruvananthapuram, Kerala, India)
- Died: 5 May 1924 (aged 70) Panmana, Travancore (present day Kollam, Kerala, India)
- Resting place: Panmana Asramam
- Notable work(s): Advaita Chinthapaddhathi, Vedadikara Nirupanam, Pracheena Malayalam etc.
- Honors: Sree Vidyadhiraja; Parama Bhattaraka; Shanmughadasan

Religious life
- Religion: Hinduism
- Philosophy: Advaita

Religious career
- Teacher: Pettayil Raman Pillai Asan; Ayyavu Swamikal; Subba Jadapadikal
- Other names: Ayyappan Pillai, Kunjan Pillai, Shanmukhadasan

Chattampi Swamikal (born 25 August 1853 – 5 May 1924) was a Hindu sage and social reformer whose thoughts and work influenced the launching of many social, religious, literary and political organizations and movements in Kerala and gave voice to those who were marginalized.

Chattampi Swamikal denounced the orthodox interpretation of Hindu texts citing sources from the Vedas. Swamikal strove to reform the heavily ritualistic and caste-ridden Hindu society of the late 19th century Kerala. Swamikal also worked for the emancipation of women and encouraged them to come to the forefront of society. Swamikal promoted vegetarianism and professed non-violence (Ahimsa). Swamikal believed that the different religions are different paths leading to the same place. Chattambi Swamikal led a wandering life like an avadutha and throughout his intellectually and spiritually enriched life maintained many friends from different regions of Kerala. He authored several books on spirituality, history, and language staying with these friends.

== Early life ==
Chattampi Swamikal was born on 25 August 1853 at Kannammoola in southern Travancore, present day Kerala. His father was Vasudevan Namputhiri of Thamarassery Illam, a Nambudiri. Brahmin from Mavelikkara, and his mother was Nangamma, a Nair women from Veniyath family in Malayinkeezh. He was called by the pet name of Kunjan Pillai. As his parents were not able to provide him formal education, he learned letters and words from children of his neighbourhood who attended schools. He learned Sanskrit by overhearing the classes at a Brahmin house nearby. Knowing his thirst for learning an uncle took him to the traditional school conducted by Pettayil Raman Pillai Asan, a renowned scholar and writer who taught him without any fee. It was there that he earned the name Chattampi on account of his assignment as the monitor of the class.

== Jñānaprajāgaram ==
In the 1870s Raman Pillai started a scholarly group named 'Jñānaprajāgaram' with experts on different subjects with progressive attitude. It served as a meeting place for many scholars of that time and facilitated Kunjan to acquaint himself with many great men. He also could learn Tamil from Swaminatha Desikar and philosophy from Professor Manonmaniam Sundaram Pillai during his participation in 'Jnanaprajagaram'. Kunjan Pillai was introduced into the science of yoga by the Thycaud Ayyavu Swamikal a scholar and yogi who used to give lectures at 'Jnanaprajagaram'. While so a wandering sadhu who came to his village temple initiated him into spiritual world by giving the Balasubramanya Mantra. Mastering this mantra gave him a new vigour and zeal and he assumed the name Shanmukhadasa due to his deep devotion of Subramanya.

== Ordinary days ==
As the burden of supporting the family fell on him, Kunjan Pillai took to many types of manual work. For many days he served as a labourer carrying building materials for the construction of the Government Secretariat building in Trivandrum. For some time he worked as a document writer and also as an advocate's clerk. He stood first in a test for clerical posts in the Government Secretariat Trivandrum conducted by Sir T Madhava Rao, the then Divan of Travancore State. But he left the service after a short while as it curtailed his freedom and prevented his wanderings for spiritual exploration and research.

== Meeting with Subba Jatapadikal ==
In one of the Philosophical Conferences organised annually by the Travancore Kings at the Palace complex adjacent to Sree Padmanabha Swami Temple, Kunjan Pillai met Subba Jatapadikal from Kalladaikurichin in Southern Tamil Nadu; a renowned teacher well versed in Tarka, Vyakarana, Mimasa, and Vedanta. Both were impressed by the other and Kunjan's wish to learn at Kalladaikurichin under him was granted.

He spent many years learning under Subba Jatapadikal. There he acquired deep and extensive mastery of all sastras in Tamil and Sanskrit. He also learned Siddha medicine, music, and martial arts. During this period he was greatly influenced by the works of Kodakanallur Sundara Swamikal a great Advaitin. He later translated his work Nijananda Vilasam containing the cream of Vedanta into simple Malayalam to guide spiritual aspirants.

== Study of other religions ==
After completing his studies under Subba Jatapadikal he spent long periods of learning under a Christian priest. In a secluded church in Southern Tamil Nadu assisting the priest he learned Christian Religion and philosophy. Later he lived with an old Muslim well versed in Qur'an and Sufi mysticism who taught him the main tenet of Islam. Kunjan acquired proficiency reading Qur'an in the traditional way. Leaving him he wandered for months with many avadhutas in Southern Tamil Nadu and also traveled all over India. These days revealed to him that the basic concepts of all religions are the same.

== Self-realisation ==
At the end of his wanderings and quest Kunjan Pillai was led to self-realisation by an avadhuta whom he met at a wayside in Vadaveeswaram a village in Tamil Nadu with whom he lived for many months in the forests without any contact with the outside world. It is believed that this avadhuta belonged to the line of immortal masters of Southern India; the Siddhas who knew the scientific art for realising God. He returned to Kerala as a great scholar and saint.

== Major disciples ==
Swamikal's prominent disciples are Narayana Guru, Neelakanta Theerthapada and Theerthapada Parmahamsa. In 1893 Swamikal met his first disciple, Theerthapada, a Sanskrit scholar and an expert in treating snakebites. Inspired by Swamikal, he prepared many works interpreting Advaita for the common man. He also reformed the social and religious rituals and rules and prepared manuals for them. He died in 1921 and Swami installed a Sivalinga above his Samadhi Peeta, which is the only temple, consecrated by him.

In 1898, Theerthapada Paramahamsa became Swami's disciple. He, too, worked for the removal of caste-related injustices in Kerala society. He established many ashrams and also Theerthapada System for the line of sanyasins following Swami's teachings and methods.

Swami Chinmayananda, Swami Abedananda, and many other saints ascribes to Swami the responsibility for their turning to spiritual life. Swami has also many grihastha disciples like Bodheswaran, Perunnelli Krishnan Vaidhyan, Velutheri Kesavan Vaidhyan, Kumbalath Sanku Pillai etc. as well as sanyasi disciples like Neelakanta Therthapada and Theerthapada Parmahamsa who played very important role in renaissance and reformation in Kerala.

== Death ==
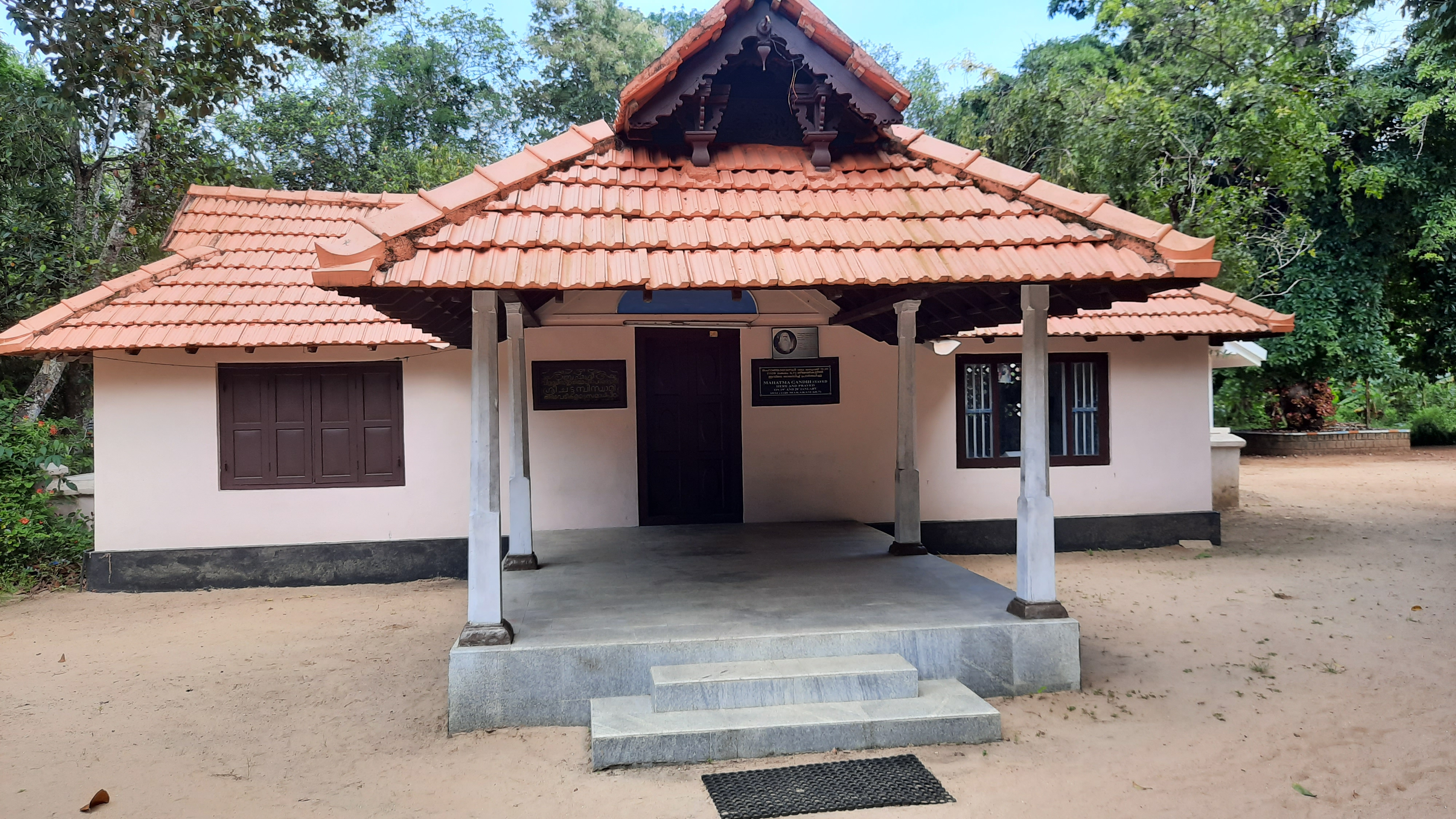
Chattambi swamy samadi

Swamikal settled down at Panmana, a village in Kollam district, towards the end of his life. He attained mahasamadhi on 5 May 1924, aged 70, after a short illness during which he objected to taking any medicine. He was buried at Panmana according to traditional Hindu saint funeral customs. Now, a temple dedicated to Lord Shiva stands above his grave.

== Major works ==
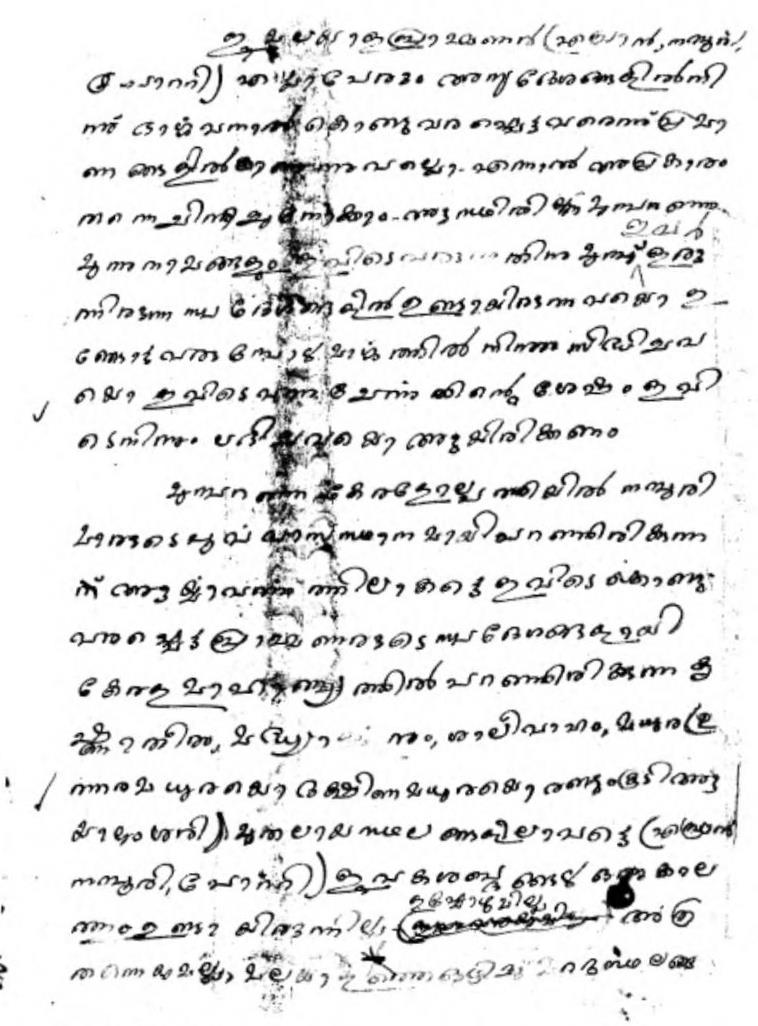
A page from Pracheena Malayalam

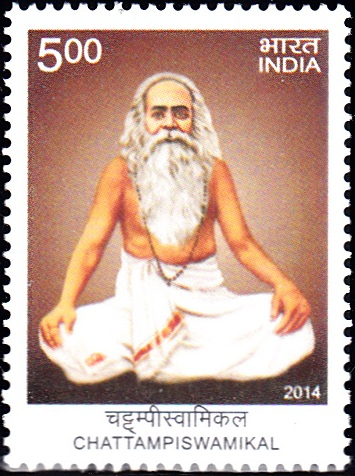
Commemorative stamp released on 30 April 2014, by the Government of India on Swamikal's 90th death anniversary

Swamikal's writings comprise various forms, such as single stanzas poems, bhajan songs, essays, critical works, translations, commentaries, short notes, and letters. Swamikal led a wandering life and left what he wrote with those who were with him at the time of writing. Most of the works were only partially recovered and published. There were no later attempts to collect and conserve them, which led to the gradual loss of many of them. A few works were discovered and published eight decades after his death and inspired serious discussion, such as Adhibhasha and Pracheena Malayalam Part -II. The Centre for South Indian Studies has formed the Chattampi Swami Digital Archive (CSDA) project as an attempt to collect and collate extant documents related to Swamikal. Important works available in print are:

- Advaita Chinta Paddhati
- Vedantasangraham
- Vedanta Saram
- Vedadikara Nirupanam
- Christhumatha Saram
- Christhumatha Nirupanam
- Adi Bhasha
- Keralathile Desa Namangal
- Jivakarunya Nirupanam
- Devarcha Paddhatiyude Upodghatam
- Devi Manasa Puja Stotra Vyakhyanam
- Nijananda Vilasam
- Pranavavum Sankhya Darsanavum
- Moksha Pradipa Khandanam
- Prapanchathil Stri Purushanmarkkulla Sthanam
- Pracheena Malayalam
- Tamizhakam
- Dravida Mahatmyam
- Kerala Charithravum Tachudaya Kaimalum
- Bhasha Padma Puranam
- Malayalathile Chila Sthala Namangal
- Srichakra Pujakalpam
- Ozhuvilodukkam (Translation)

The following works are not available, except through excerpts published in various journals and books by contemporaries.

- Advaita Panjaram
- Chidakasa Layam
- Tarka Rahasya Ratnam
- Parama Bhattara Darsanam
- Punarjanma Nirupanam
- Brahmatatva Nirbhasam
- Bhugola Sastram
- Shanmata Nirupanam
- Sarva Mata Samarasyam
- Stava Ratna Haravali

=== Vedadikara Nirupanam ===
Vedadikara Nirupanam is considered as one of his greatest works. It refuted the baseless customs and rules that existed in Kerala. For the first time in the region's history the work questioned the monopolisation of Vedas, sciences and education by a minority. While Nitya Chaitanya Yathi read it to his Master Nataraja Guru, the Master told that 'The words of the book are true like fire and it was to be considered our luck that these papers have not got burned'. Vedadikara Nirupanam’s intervention into knowledge practices anticipates contemporary Open Knowledge and Open Science not merely as distributive reforms as we generally consider it but as critiques of epistemic enclosure. Vedadikara Nirupanam challenges regimes of knowledge grounded in hierarchy, sacred authority, and colonial mediation, exposing how exclusion operates through language, ritual, and institutional privilege. Yet Swamikal moves beyond modern openness frameworks by locating access at the level of epistemic agency rather than circulation alone. Through the deliberate displacement of classical languages by the vernacular and the re-situating of philosophy within everyday life, Swamikal articulates a de-colonial ethic of intelligibility. Openness, in this formulation, emerges as a practice of epistemic justice - one that destabilizes inherited orders of authorization and reconfigures knowledge as a shared, emancipatory horizon rather than a regulated resource.

=== Works on Vedanta ===
Swami wrote many guides and commentaries on Vedanta for the common man. Notable among them is Advaita Chinthapaddhathi (1949), an introductory manual on practical Advaita. written in simple language to enable ordinary people without knowledge of Sanskrit to learn Vedanta. The book describes the 'Trigunas', 'Trimurthees', 'Jivatmas', 'Panchabhutas', 'sukshma', 'sthula', 'Sarirotpatti', 'Dasagunas' 'Prapancholpatti', 'Tatvamasi' and related Vedic concepts.

=== Works on Christianity ===
Christumatha Nirupanam contains two books – the Christumatha Saram (meaning Cream of Christianity) and Christumatha Nirupanam. The Christumatha Saram is his summary of what Christianity is, in accordance with the classical Indian Purva paksha tradition. In Christumatha Chedanam, he criticises various tenets of Christianity which goes against the teachings of Christ. Relying on the Bible itself he disapproves the arguments supporting conversion presented by the missionaries.

=== Research methods ===
Pracheena Malayalam also aimed at awakening the mind of the people of the region divided by various complexes to a collective sense of 'We'. Convictions of common origin and belief in a common ancestry were indispensable for the development of a collective mindset. Swami explored the roots of Kerala society and original inhabitants, and sociologically and genealogically connected most of the present groups in Kerala including the priestly class to common ancestors who were the original inhabitants known as the Nakas. B. Hrdaya Kumari says that Pracheena Malayalam is not only a good example of Swamikal's logical arguments but is the earliest example of application of hypothesis and fixed methodology for historical studies.

=== Women's rights ===
Swamikal also worked for the emancipation of women and encouraged them to come to the forefront of society. He stated that ancient religion and law in India gave equal status to women and that their role is very important in family and society. He stated that it was the misinterpretation of ancient texts resulting from male arrogance that degraded the position of women and their enslavement.

== See also ==
Other social reformers of Kerala:

- Sree Narayana Guru
- Dr. Palpu
- Kumaranasan
- Rao Sahib Dr. Ayyathan Gopalan
- Brahmananda Swami Sivayogi
- Vaghbhatananda
- Mithavaadi Krishnan
- Moorkoth Kumaran
- Ayyankali
- Ayya Vaikundar
- Pandit Karuppan
- Kuriakose Elias Chavara

== Cited sources ==
- Raman Nair, R; Sulochana Devi, L (2010). Chattampi Swami: An Intellectual Biography. Chattampi Swami Archive, Centre for South Indian Studies. ISBN 9788190592826.
