= K. Balakrishnan =

Indian politician (1924–1984)

Personal details
- Born: 18 March 1924 Thoppil veedu, Mayyanad, Kollam District, India
- Died: 16 July 1984 (aged 60) Trivandrum
- Party: Revolutionary Socialist Party
- Spouse(s): Chandrika Balakrishnan, B.A.,
- Children: 3

Kesavan Balakrishnan (March 18, 1924 – July 16, 1984) was a politician, publisher, writer, columnist and editor. He was born to C. Kesavan, former Chief Minister of the erstwhile Travancore-Cochin state, and Mrs. Vasanthi. He had taken active part in the struggle for independence and was jailed six times.

== Life Events ==
Balakrishnan was one of the founding leaders of the Revolutionary Socialist Party (RSP) in Kerala. He was elected as an MLA to the Travancore-Cochin State Assembly in 1954 from the constituency of Trivandrum II.

In 1971 he became the MP representing the constituency of Ambalapuzha in Loksabha. He would later go on to receive the Thamarapathram, an award given to outstanding politicians and activists by the government of India.

K. Balakrishnan is best remembered as the editor and publisher of Kaumudi weekly―a periodical started by his grand father C V Kunhiraman―that was widely popular in the southern parts of the present Kerala state. A unique feature in the weekly, 'pathradhiparodu chodikkuka' (Ask the editor) in which readers could ask the editor about anything under the sun (but not a quiz session) was immensely appreciated by most readers.

== Books ==
- Niramillatha Marivillu
- Kalayalavu Oru varsham
- Sahyadri Sanukalil ( Travelogue)
- Nananjupoyi enkilum Jwala ( Auto Biography)
- Madhuvidu Premam
- Manja Jalam
- Kedatha Jwala (his biography written by notable journalist Prasannarajan)

== K Balakrishnan Memorial Award ==
This is an award issued to outstanding journalists in Kerala in memory of K. Balakrishnan (constituted by Balakrishnan Smaraka Samithi).
