= MYY =

MYY or myy may refer to:

- Macuna language (ISO 639-3: myy), Colombia
- Mayyanad railway station (Indian Railways station code: MYY), Kerala, India
- Miri Airport (IATA: MYY), Sarawak, Malaysia
