= Kavarikulam Kandan Kumaran =

Indian social reformer

- Born: 25 October 1863; Mallappally, Perumpally, Thiruvalla, Travancore
- Died: 16 October 1934 (aged 70); Kerala
- Occupation(s): Social reformer, dalit activist, Sree Moolam Popular Assembly member
- Parents: Kanthan; Mani

Kavarikulam Kandan Kumaran was a social reformer and Sree Moolam Prajasabha member from Kerala, India. He was a member of the Sree Moolam Prajasabha from 1915 to 1932. In 1911 August 29 he founded the organization Brahma Pratyaksha Sadhujana Paripalana Parayar Sangam.

== Biography ==
Kandan Kumaran was born on 25 October 1863, the son of Kandan and Mani, in the Kavarikulam family, a backward family in Perumpatty, a remote village near Mallapalli, in the Thiruvalla taluk, which was part of the then Travancore kingdom.

Kumaran's family has been tenants and dependents for generations. The parents' job was farming and plowing. He told his parents that he want to study, but they were helpless. His neighbor Kittu Pillai Asan secretly taught him Malayalam and Sanskrit. While others tried to stop it, Kumaran did not back down. He learned to read, write and preach well by his own efforts.

Kandan Kumaran was involved in community reform by founding the organization Brahma Pratyaksha Sadhujana Paripalana Parayar Sangam. He started the organization on 29 August 1911 to overcome the challenges faced by the Paraya community. The goal of the organization was "land, education and government jobs" for the community members. The weekly Bhajan Maths were converted into night schools. Recognizing the importance of personal empowerment in organizational work, he called to strengthen the mind through meditation and the body through exercise. He not only established and operated 52 one-teacher schools but also sought to gain access to public schools for children from his own community. The schools he started in Travancore were later taken over by the government and converted into government welfare schools.

Kumaran was a member of the Sree Moolam Prajasabha from 1915 to 1932. He had been walking for days to reach the Prajasabha meeting in Thiruvananthapuram. Kandan Kumaran was the first in the Prajasabha to demand that poor students be given lunch and a lump sum grant. He brought to the notice of the Prajasabha the issue of scholarships for students, barriers to getting employment in the government service, and the problems of laborers. Among the backward castes, after Ayyankali, Kandankumaran was the longest serving (14 years) Prajasabha member. His historic speech in the Prajasabha on 22 February 1917 is noteworthy for a number of reasons. "The upper castes oppose the admission of children from my community to government schools, even though the education code does not prohibit it. Therefore, my community runs 52 schools in Kunnathoor, Mavelikkara, Thiruvalla, Ambalappuzha, Changanassery and Peerumed taluks" he said in his speech. The literacy rate of the Parayar community, which was only 0.05 per cent in the 1911 census, has risen to 23 per cent in the 1931 census, is a perfect example of Kandan Kumaran's unique and enduring campaign.

He died on 16 October 1934.

== Legacy ==
Inaugurating Kavarikulam Kandan Kumaran Memorial Trust, then Kerala finance minister Thomas Isaac said that Kavarikulam Kandan Kumaran was a man who has made significant contributions to the history of the Renaissance in Kerala.

== Books on him ==
His biography named Kavarikulam Kandan Kumaran: orucharithra padanam (Meaning: Kavarikulam Kandan Kumaran: a historial study), published by the Kerala Bhasha Institute and written by Prof. S. Kochukunju, a history teacher and eminent writer was published on 15 May 2019.

The book Kavarikulam Kandan Kumaran jeevithavum Prajasabha prasangangalum, ISBN 9780000118097 (Meaning: Kavarikulam Kandan Kumaran Life and Prajasabha Speeches) edited by R. Ramakrishnan and published by Mythri books was published in May 2019.
