= Sadananda Swami =

Sadananda Swami is a Hindu honorific title and may refer to:

- Ayyavu Swamikal (1814-1909), Indian spiritualist and social reformer
- Sadananda Das (1908-1977), German-born Gaudiya Vaishnava leader
