= K. Sukumaran (journalist) =

Indian journalist

- Born: 8 January 1903; Mayyanad, India
- Died: 18 September 1981 (aged 78)
- Other names: ′Patradhipar′ K Sukumaran
- Occupation: Editor
- Known for: Kerala Kaumudi Daily; Kala Kaumudi
- Awards: Padmabhushan

Kunhiraman Sukumaran (8 January 1903 – 18 September 1981), was the editor of Kerala Kaumudi Daily. He served as the President of Sree Narayana Dharma Paripalana Yogam during 1953-54.

== Personal life ==
K. Sukumaran was born on 8 January 1903 to reformer, thinker and socio-cultural leader C.V. Kunhiraman and Kunjikavu in Mayyanad of Kollam District who established Kerala Kaumudi as a periodical in 1911. Sukumaran's brother Damodaran who was the Head Translator to the Govt was also a known writer and public figure and Sister Vasanthi was married to C. Kesavan, Chief Minister of Travancore-Cochin State. He married Madhavi and had four sons- (all late) M.S. Mani, M.S. Madhusoodanan, M.S. Sreenivasan and M.S. Ravi who were all running the Newspaper and other Publications of Kerala Kaumudi and Kala Kaumudi.

== Awards and recognitions ==
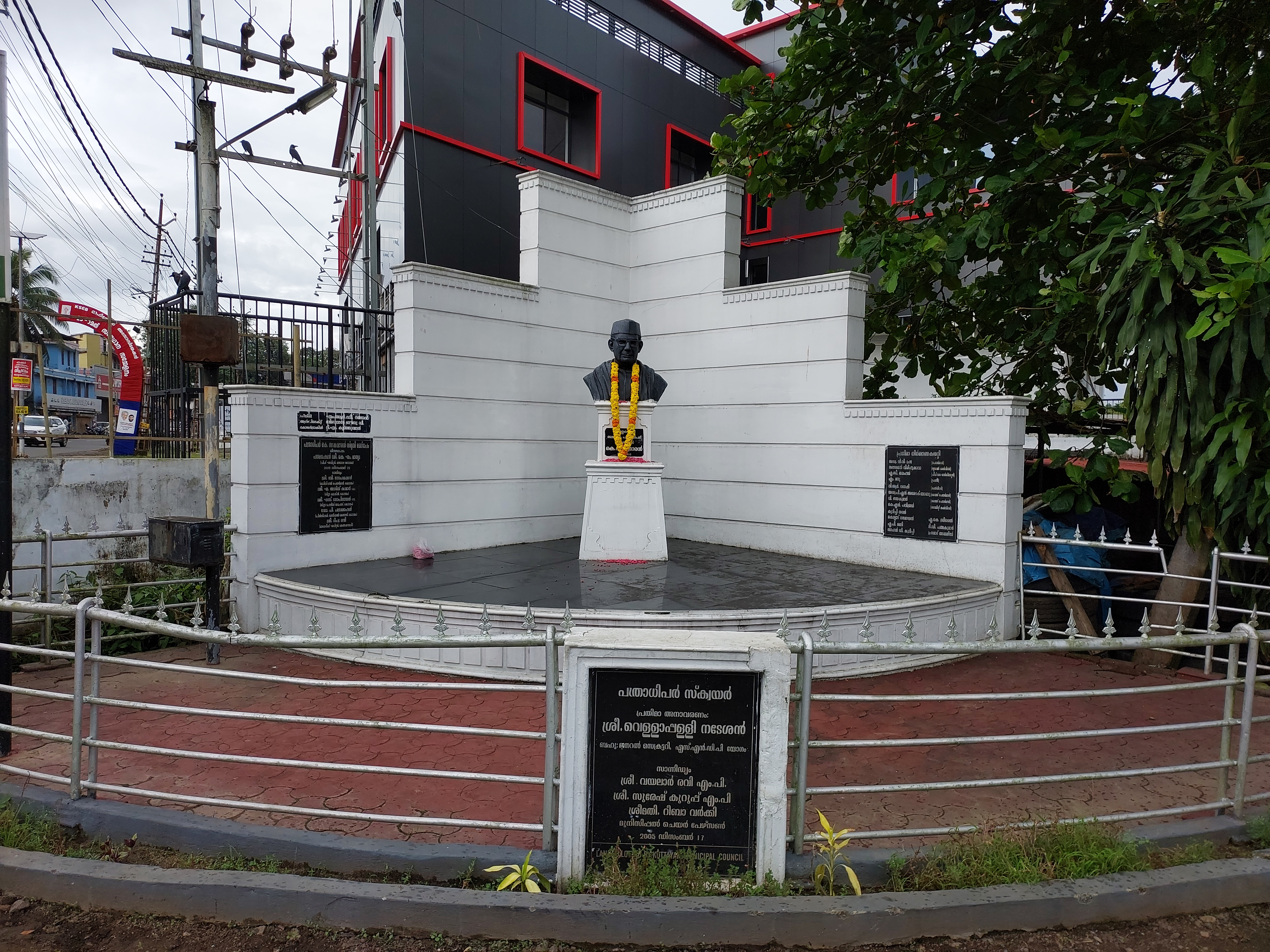
Memorial statue at Kodimatha, Kottayam

K. Sukumaran was honored Padmabhushan, the third highest civilian Award by Government of India in 1973.
