= Pampady Joseph =

Indian activist

- Born: Pampady John Joseph; 23 May 1887; Pampady, British India
- Died: 14 July 1940 (aged 53)
- Education: Trukkakara Mission School
- Occupation: Teacher
- Spouse: Sara Joseph
- Children: 3
- Writing career
- Subject: Dalit activism
- Notable works: Sadhujan Dootan (Periodical), Cheruma Boy

Pampady John Joseph (23 May 1887 in Pampady – 14 July 1940) was a Dalit activist and the founder of the socio-religious movement Cheramar MahajanSabha.

== Early life ==
Joseph was born in 1887 at Pampady, Kottayam to John. His father was a Christian who was converted from Pulaya (then untouchable) caste to Catholic Christian. Joseph was educated up to the sixth standard at Trukkakara Mission School. He moved to Thiruvananthapuram in 1918.

== Career ==
Joseph worked for some time as a teacher. He felt that the Catholic Church was not treating newly converted Christians as equals to their Syrian counterparts, leading to dissatisfaction among the converts.

Joseph believed that the Pulayars were the original inhabitants of Kerala and hence he called them Cheramar, which means the people of Kerala. He organised the Cheramar Mahajan Sabha on 14 January 1921 to protest against the traditional attitude and customs of the caste Hindus and caste Hindu converts. Caste Christians as well as untouchable Hindus were allowed to be the members and the organisation worked to counter the Hindu mentality and obtain rights. He thought that the Cheramar, Pulayar, Parayar and Kuravar are the Adi Dravida races of India.

Joseph initiated the Sadhujan Dootan magazine in 1919, in which he wrote inspiring articles. It was published until 1924.

Joseph, in his book Cheruma Boy, questioned the Syrian Christian's apathetic and discriminatory attitude towards the untouchable Christians.

On 8 June 1931, Joseph became a member of the Shri Moolam Legislative Assembly in Travancore. In 1935 he asked the British Parliament to grant the same civil rights for untouchables as were available to other communities.

Joseph also suggested that untouchable Christians should combat their lack of equal treatment within religious bodies by constructing their own churches and temples. He also acquired land for redistribution among the untouchables.

=== Organizations founded by Pampady ===
He had founded as many as four organizations for the Cheramar community he had belonged to ― Cheramar Mahajanasabha, Cheramar Sangh, Akhila Travancore Cheramar Mahajanasabha and Cheramar Sabha.
