= Ayyankali =

Indian social reformer (1866–1941)

Mahatma Ayyankali
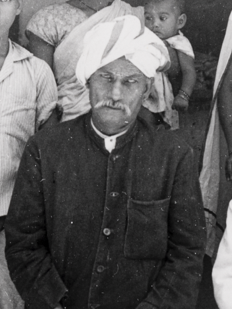
- Ayyankali c. 1901 – c. 1908
- Born: 28 August 1863; Venganoor, Kingdom of Travancore (present day Thiruvananthapuram, Kerala, India)
- Died: 18 June 1941 (aged 77); Trivandrum, Kingdom of Travancore, British India (present day Thiruvananthapuram, Kerala, India)
- Spouse: Chellamma (m. 1888)
- Children: 7

Ayyankali (28 August 1863 – 18 June 1941) was an Indian social reformer, educator, economist, lawmaker, and revolutionary leader. He worked for the advancement of oppressed people in the princely state of Travancore. His struggles resulted in many changes that improved the socio-political structure of Kerala. His determined and relentless efforts transformed the lives of Dalits. He is known as the King of Pulaya.

== Background ==
Ayyankali was born on 28 August 1863 in Venganoor, Thiruvananthapuram, Travancore. He was the first of eight children born to Ayyan and Mala, who were members of the Pulayar community. The family led a marginally better life compared to other Pulayars as they were given 5 acres (2.0 ha) of land by the landlord with whom Ayyan was an "Adiyalan" (slave) spending all his time serving the Janmi or Zamindar (feudal landlord). Members of the Pulayar community generally worked as bonded labor for the Janmis during this time and did not have the right to own land or even enter temples to pray.

The region in which Ayyankali lived, which now forms part of the state of Kerala, was particularly affected by social divisions during his lifetime and was described as a "mad house" of castes. The Pulayars were regarded as the slaves of the agrarian society in the kingdom and they suffered greatly from oppressive discrimination, particularly from the landowning castes including the Nair caste.

Suffering from this social injustice caused Ayyankali to join his Pulayar friends who gathered at the end of their workday to sing and dance to folk music that protested the situation.

Some joined him in forming a group that challenged the members of the oppressor castes sometimes leading to physical fights. His popularity earned him the names of Urpillai and Moothapullai translated roughly as 'Leader of the Land' or 'Elder Leader'.

Ayyankali married Chellamma in 1888. The couple had seven children.

== Campaigning ==
=== Freedom of movement ===
In 1893, Ayyankali, dressed in clothing traditionally associated with upper-caste people, and defied the social conventions that applied to oppressed people by riding on a road in a bullock cart he had bought. Both the act of purchase and that of travelling on a road that was traditionally the domain of the upper castes were daring acts. In a similar act of defiance, he entered the marketplace at Nedumangad. These protests, which have been described by Nisar and Kanadasamy as "laying claim to the public space", strengthened the resolve of others from oppressed communities of Travancore to shake off the shackles of social oppression, leading to further acts of protest elsewhere, such as in Kazhakkoottam. The outcome of the continued protest marches, which sometimes turned violent, became known as "Chaliyar riots". By 1900, the Pulayars had gained the right to use most roads in the state, although they were still barred from roads that led to Hindu temples.

Later, in 1904, Ayyankali was inspired by the speech of the reformist Ayyavu Swamikal. He had been preaching the need to break caste divisions because he thought that doing so would limit the number of people who were converting from Hinduism to Christianity. (Note: The number of conversions to Christianity had burgeoned after 1860, when the influence of Christian missionaries as a route to achieving social change became apparent to the oppressed population.) A branch of Swamikal's Brahma Nishta Matam, an organisation, was established in that year by Ayyankali and some friends in Venganoor. Ayyankali also drew inspiration from the activities of Narayana Guru, a contemporary social reformer from the Ezhava caste, although the two men differed in their philosophies and the means of turning it into reality. The Ezhava and Pulayar communities did occasionally ally with each other, one of which was the campaign to gain access to the Hindu temple in Vaikom.

=== Education ===
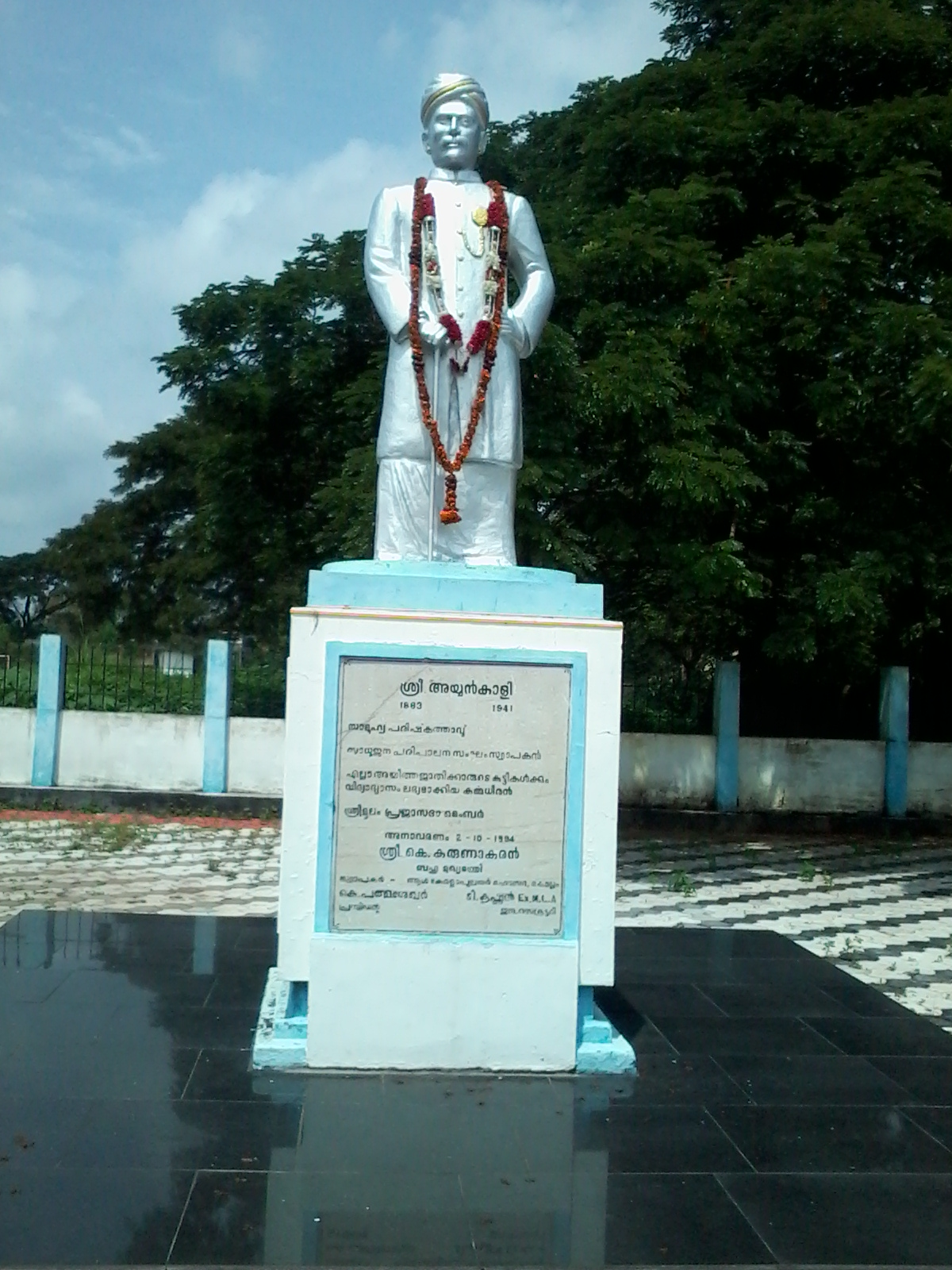
Statue of Ayyankali in Kollam

Ayyankali also sought to improve access to education for the oppressed classes. A few Pulayars had gained access to schools set up by the Colonial Missionary Society and the London Missionary Society from around the mid-nineteenth century. (Note: The London Missionary Society established the Pulaya Charity School in Thiruvananthapuram in 1861, and similar schools were built across the region.) Conversion to Christianity was a prerequisite for attendance at such schools, and there were cases where Pulayars offered to contribute to the cost of supplying teachers for them. However, Ayyankali, who was illiterate, believed that education should be available to all children and this meant that government schools should allow access to untouchables.

The government was already attempting to modernize its approach to social welfare. Several public schools were opened for "untouchable" communities after 1895 but the right to primary education was limited in scope. State funding of education became effective in 1904 but even after the government ordered schools to admit children "untouchable" castes in 1907, local officials found ways to refuse it. In that year, helped by the experience gained from organizing the Brahma Nishta Mattam, Ayyankali founded the Sadhu Jana Paripalana Sangham (SJPS) (Association for the Protection of the Poor) which campaigned for access to schools and raised funds to set up Pulayar-operated schools in the interim. This attracted support from both Hindus and Christians. (Note: Sources vary regarding whether Ayyankali or Krishnathi Asan later founded the All-Cochin Pulaya Maha Sabha (Pulaya Great Assembly) in 1913.)

An attempt by Ayyankali to enroll a Pulayar girl in a government school led to violent acts perpetrated by upper castes against the community and eventually to the burning down of the school building in the village of Ooruttambalam. His response was an organized strike of agricultural labor, a first strike action by oppressed agricultural laborers of the region. They withdrew from the paddy fields owned by the upper castes until the government acceded to their demand for removing restrictions based on caste to education. (Note: The date of this strike is disputed. Some sources say it occurred in 1915 but others say 1907-08.)

Ayyankali was also central to the success of the Pulaya challenge against the traditional strictures that prohibited females of the community from covering their upper body in the public. The upper caste Hindus had insisted the custom was necessary to distinguish the untouchable people.

The Channar revolt helped the Nadar people to not follow the practice before Ayyankali's birth. However, this revolt did not do anything for the Pulaya self-dignity to cover themselves until 1915–16.

=== Representation ===
Ayyankali later became a member of the assembly of Travancore, known as the Sree Moolam Popular Assembly (SMPA) or Praja Sabha.

== Public acceptance, honors and veneration ==
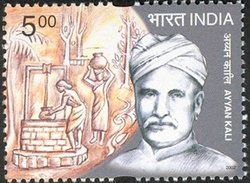
Aykan Kali Stamp of India - 2002

In 2002, Ayyankali was commemorated on an Indian postage stamp.

The historian P. Sanal Mohan has described Ayyankali as "the most important leader of modern Kerala". He is also known as the Kerala Spartacus. The anniversary of Ayyankali's birth has been celebrated by his descendants and by special interest groups.

== See also ==
- Sree Narayana Guru
- Chattampi Swamikal
- Dr. Palpu
- Kumaranasan
- Rao Sahib Dr. Ayyathan Gopalan
- Brahmananda Swami Sivayogi
- Vaghbhatananda
- Mithavaadi Krishnan
- Moorkoth Kumaran
- Ayya Vaikundar
- Pandit Karuppan
- Kuriakose Elias Chavara
