= Kerala Kaumudi =

Indian-Malayalam language daily

- Type: Daily newspaper
- Format: Broadsheet
- Publisher: Darshan Ravi
- Editor-in-chief: Deepu Ravi
- Founded: 1911; 115 years ago
- Language: Malayalam
- Headquarters: Kaumudi Buildings, Thiruvananthapuram – 695 024, India
- Website: www.keralakaumudi.com
- Free online archives: www.keralakaumudi.com/news/print/index.htm

Kerala Kaumudi is a Malayalam language daily newspaper published from Kerala, India, headquartered in the state capital, Thiruvananthapuram. It was founded in 1911 by C. V. Kunhiraman as a periodical. His son K. Sukumaran later served as the newspaper's editor. Kerala Kaumudi is one of the largest circulated newspapers in Malayalam with 9 editions, published from Thiruvananthapuram, Kollam, Alappuzha, Pathanamthitta, Kottayam, Kochi, Thrissur, Kozhikode and Kannur besides being circulated in the United Arab Emirates.

In the course of over a century, Kerala Kaumudi has diversified and expanded into a multitude of media platforms. In addition to the daily, Kerala Kaumudi comprises a midday named Kerala Kaumudi Flash, the Kerala Kaumudi Weekly, the children's magazine Magic Slate, the glossy film magazine Flash Movies, an online edition of the newspaper and the television channel Kaumudy TV. Kerala Kaumudi Weekly, formerly edited by K. Balakrishnan, remained a popular literary journal in Kerala for a long period.

== Kaumudy TV ==
Logo used since 2013

Kaumudy TV is a Malayalam language free to air television channel owned by the owners of the Malayalam daily newspaper Kerala Kaumudi. The channel was officially launched on 5 May 2013. Its main program is Tom and Jessy. Prime Minister Manmohan Singh had already unveiled the logo of the channel a year earlier during the centenary celebrations of Kerala Kaumudi. The program menu comprises news, talks, interviews and entertainment.

== Editions ==
Kerala Kaumudi is printed from Thiruvananthapuram, Kollam, Alappuzha, Kottayam, Kochi, Pathanamthitta, Thrissur, Kozhikode, Kannur in Kerala and Bangalore.

== See also ==
- Kaumudy TV
