= Kannammoola =

- town
- Location in Kerala, India
- Coordinates: 8°30′12″N 76°55′54″E
- Country: India
- State: Kerala
- District: Thiruvananthapuram
- Elevation: 21 m (69 ft)

Population
  - Total: 4,232

Languages
  - Official: Malayalam, English
- Time zone: UTC+5:30 (IST)
- PIN: 695011
- Telephone code: 0471
- Vehicle registration: KL-01
- Lok Sabha constituency: Thiruvananthapuram
- Legislative assembly constituency: Vattiyoorkavu
- Councillor: Saranya SS

Kannammoola is an urban neighborhood of Thiruvananthapuram, Kerala, India. The Aakkulam lake that forms a part of the Kerala backwaters is situated in Kannammoola.

Kannammoola was the birthplace of Chattampi Swamikal, who is considered to be one of the greatest religious scholars and reformer of Kerala. The mortal remains of Velu Thampi Dalawa, who had committed suicide to avoid capture when surrounded by the soldiers of the new Dalawa, were gibbetted by the British at Kannammoola.

Thiruvananthapuram International Airport is located nearby and the closest railway stations are Pettah and Thiruvananthapuram Central.

== Geography ==
Kannammoola is on the banks of the Aakkulam Lake. The Amayizhanjan canal, which flows through Kannammoola, forms the lake. Three bridges cross the canal in Kannamoola: the Kakkodu Bridge, the Nellikhuzu Bridge, and the Kannamoola Bridge.

== History ==
The suburb was initially owned by a Namboothiri family called Kolloor Athiyara Mathom. It was a stronghold for Nair families before it became a metropolitan suburb.

In 1809, the British sentenced Velu Thampi Dalawa, a former Dewan of Travancore and freedom fighter, to be executed in Kannammoola. However, Dalawa committed suicide at the Mannadi Temple before being arrested. The British brought his body to the west end of a Karanavar's property, and Dalawa was hung on a post on a hill in Kannammoola; the hill was renamed Dalawa Kunnu (transl. "Dalawa's Hill").

== Notable residents ==
Chattampi Swamikal, one of the scholar-saints of Kerala, was born in of Kannamoola on August 25, 1853. Earlier called Kunjan Pillai, he was a social reformer and a contemporary of Narayana Guru. Swamikal fought against the rigid caste system and social vices and challenged the prevalent value system. In his book Pracheena Malayalam, Swamikal argues that the evil of caste and the superiority claims of the Brahmins are without any logic. He severely criticized the Brahmin domination of that period. He wrote several books on religion and spirituality. Swamikal's meeting with Swami Vivekananda in 1892 was instrumental in bringing about social change in a caste-ridden society. Swamikal entered Samadhi at Panmana, 18 kilometres (11 mi) north of Kollam, in 1924.

== Transportation ==
Kannammoola is connected by private and KSRTC buses. The nearest major railway station is Thiruvananthapuram Central. 2 kilometres (1.2 mi) away is Pettah, a smaller railway station. The nearest airport is Thiruvananthapuram International Airport.
