= Mayyanad =

- Census Town
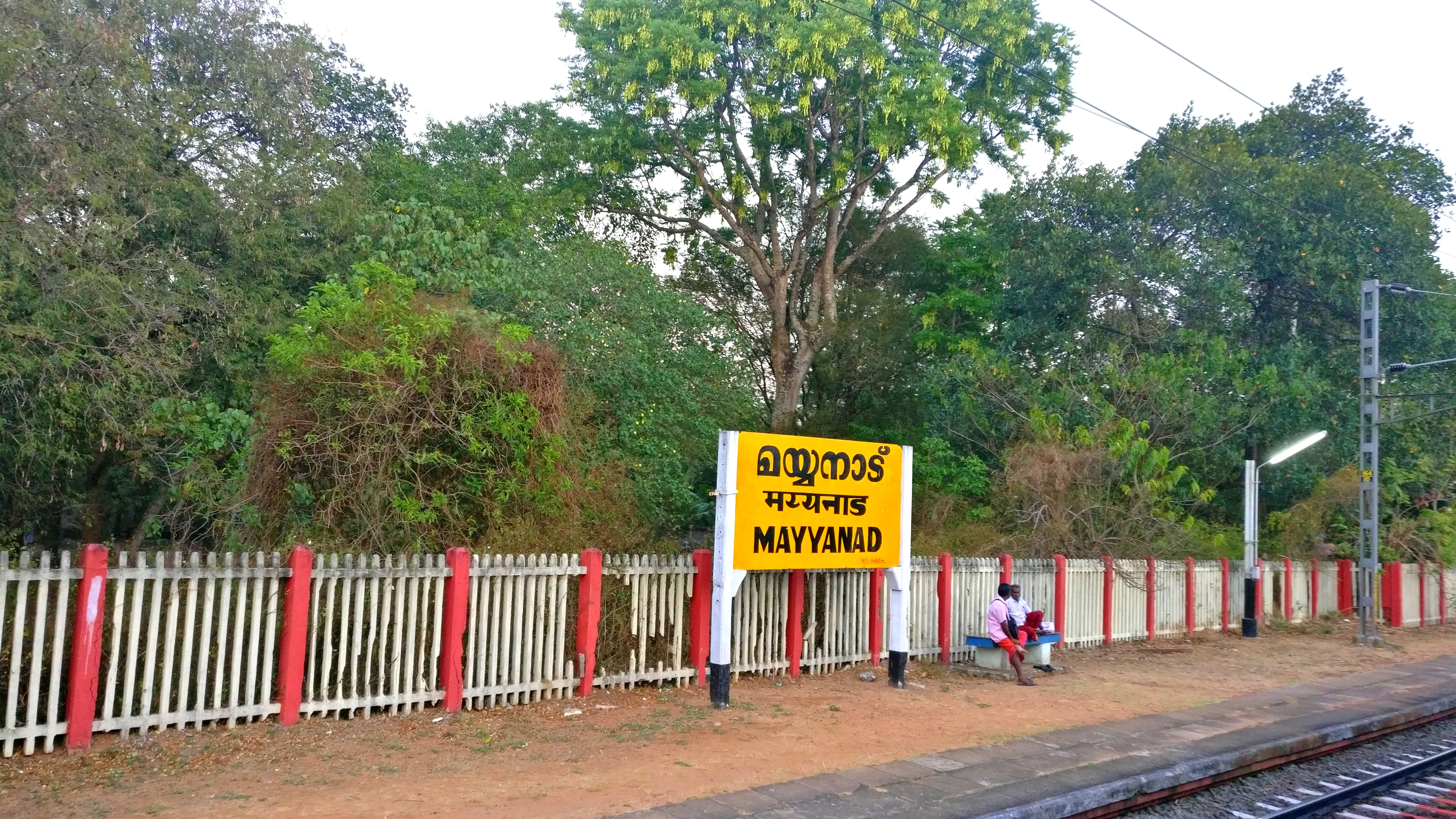
- Railway Station

- Location in Kerala Location in India
- Coordinates: 8°50′20.641″N 76°38′48.749″E
- Country: India
- State: Kerala
- District: Kollam

Government
  - Type: Panchayat Raj
  - Body: Mayyanad Grama Panchayat

Area
  - Census Town: 14.77 km^{2} (5.70 sq mi)

Population (2011)
  - Census Town: 40,039
  - Rank: 13th in Kollam
  - Density: 2,711/km^{2} (7,021/sq mi)
  - Metro: No metropolitan area.

Languages
  - Official: Malayalam, English
- Time zone: UTC+5:30 (IST)
- PIN: 691303
- Telephone code: +91-474-255****
- Vehicle registration: KL-02
- Nearest city: Kollam (10 km)
- Climate: Tropical (Köppen)

Mayyanad is a census town in Kollam district in the state of Kerala, India.

== Location and geography ==
Mayyanad is located in the south western suburbs of Kollam district, Kollam city about 10 kilometres (6.2 mi) south of the city centre and 6 kilometres (3.7 mi) north of Paravur Town. Mayyanad is also situated on the banks of the Paravur Lake and has an Arabian Sea coastline noted for its fishing.

The village has railway access through Mayyanad railway station and National Highway 66 can be accessed through Kottiyam situated 6 km away. Mayyanad can be reached by frequent buses from Kollam city and Kottiyam town and by local train from Kollam and Thiruvananthapuram. There is no transportation facility through waterways despite Thiruvananthapuram–Shoranur canal and Paravur Lake situated nearby.

The neighbourhoods in Mayyanad are, Valiyavila, Thani, Kootikada, Karikuzhy and 4 more.

The soil type is predominantly Laterite and major crop is Coconut. The village is a watershed which drains to Paravur Lake.Umayanalloor Vayal/Polder is a significant geographic feature and is a prominent paddy cultivation area.

== Administration and politics ==
In terms of revenue administration, the village is part of Kollam district and it falls under Mayyanad village office of Kollam Taluk.

Under Panchayati raj, Mayyanad is part of Kollam Jilla Panchayat, Mukhathala Block panchayat and, Mayyanad Grama Panchayat. The Grama Panchayat is ruled with a Communist Party of India (Marxist) majority.

The village is represented in Kerala Legislative Assembly by Eravipuram MLA and in Parliament of India by Kollam Lok Sabha MP.

== Demography ==
As per 2011 census of India the village of Mayyanad has a population of 40,039. The Sex ratio is 1118 and Literacy is 95.2%. As of 2025, it is estimated that the population should be approximately 56,000.

The population is 53.6% Hindus (comprising SC-ST 12%), 31.3% Muslims and 14.5% Christians. The Hindus are majorly Ezhavas and Christians are largely Latin Catholics.

== History ==
The coast of Mayyanad between Paravoor estuary and Mukkam was a landing place for sea farers and traders. Chillakkal south of Mayyanad had interaction with Arabs in past. Mayyanad had significant influence of Buddhism in ancient times. The present day Sastha Kovil is regarded as an ancient place of Buddhist worship. The village had its first parish in 1527 during Portuguese colonialism.

Through Pidiyari Fund (handful rice) movement during Vaikom Satyagraha village also has a place in Kerala reformation movement.

== Important places and landmarks ==
=== Local attractions ===
The Umayanalloor Temple is a very ancient temple and Pullichira Immaculate Conception Church are famous pilgrimage center for Catholic Christians. Paravur Lake along with sandbar on west stretching from Thanni to Pozhikkara and mangrove cladded Estuary formed by Ithikkara River are famous tourist attractions.

=== Educational institutions ===
Schools located in Mayyanad Village are

1. Mayyanad Higher Secondary School
2. Government Higher Secondary School Vellamanal, Mayyanad
3. Sasthamkovil Model LP School, Mayyanad
4. Sasthamkovil LP School, Koottikkada
5. Mannam Memorial Residential Public School Mayyanad

=== Temples ===
- Valiyavila Madannada
- Vayalil Madannada
- Sasthamkovil Temple Mayyanad
- Sasthamkovil Temple Koottikada
- Kochunada Bhagavathi Temple
- Janmamkulam Bhagavathi Temple
- Thanni Swargapuram Bhagavathi Temple
- Mulaikkalkavu Devi Temple
- KaithaPuzha Siva Temple
- Vaikkathodam Sree Krishna Temple

== Trivia ==
- The Malayalam daily newspaper Kerala Kaumudi was first published by C. V. Kunhiraman at Mayyanad in 1911.
- Social reformer and Chief Minister of Travancore–Cochin state C. Kesavan hailed from the village.
- The Deshabhimani Kollam edition is printed from Mayyanad.
- The origin of place name Mayyanad is attributed to Mayyanattillam one of the twelve major illams within Ezhavas.
