= Kochu Hassan Kunju =

Indian politician

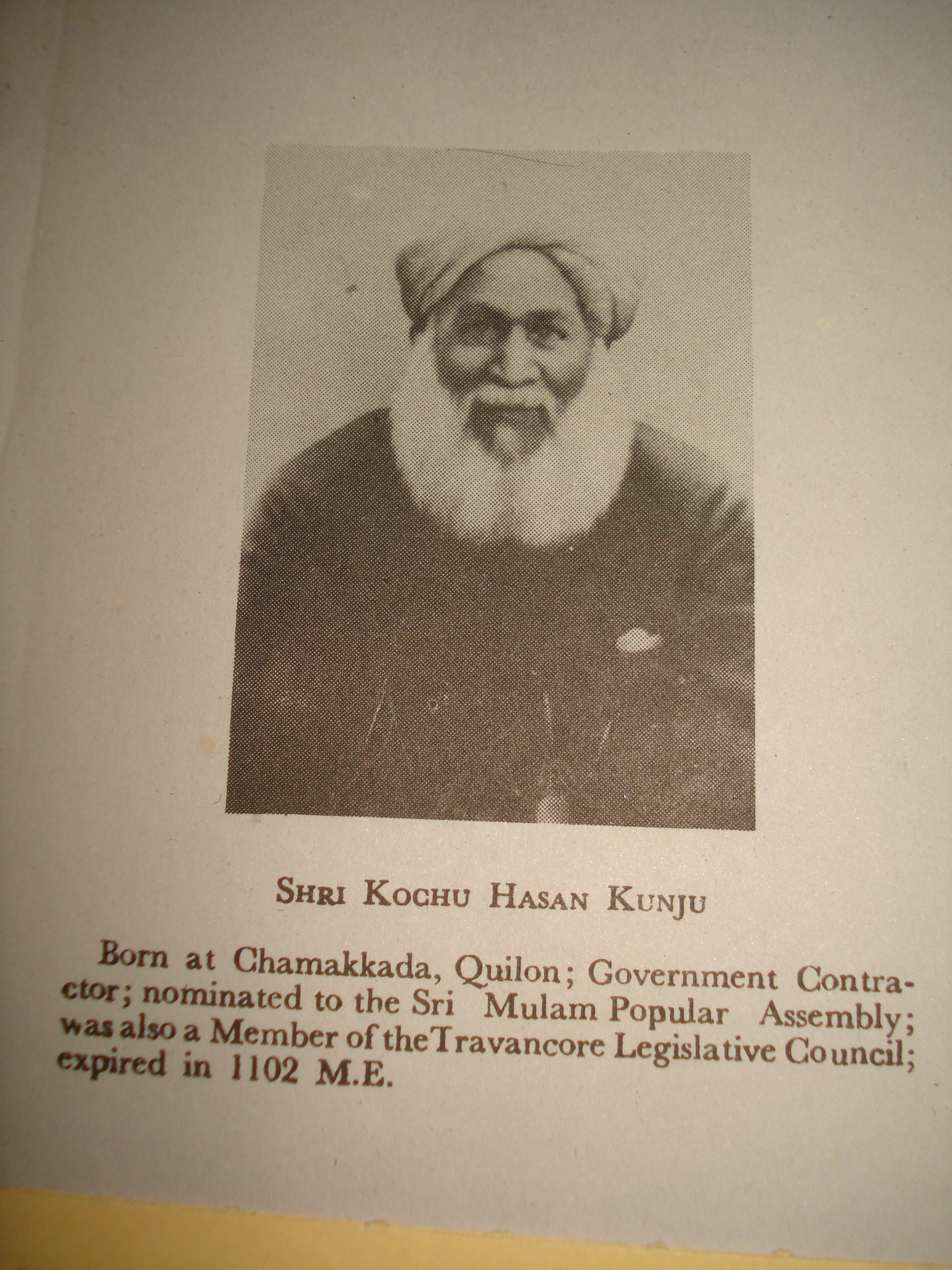
- Born: 1835; Quilon district, Travancore (present-day Kollam district, Kerala, India)
- Died: 1926 (aged 90–91)
- Occupation: Politician
- Known for: Member of the Sree Moolam Popular Assembly
- Office: Sree Moolam Popular Assembly
- Father: Sahib Bahadur Syed Kunju

Kochu Hassan Kunju (1835–1926) was an Indian politician from Kerala. He was a member of India's first elected assembly, the Sree Moolam Popular Assembly.

== Biography ==
Kochu Hassan Kunju was born to a Muslim family in Quilon district (now Kollam district) in the Indian state of Kerala. His father was a trader in Travancore, Sahib Bahadur Syed Kunju, who imported dates from the Persian Gulf area as well as traded in sulphur and nitrate. Kunju was nominated to the Travancore Legislative Council by the Travancore ruler and was later a member of India's first elected assembly, the Sree Moolam Popular Assembly.
