= Kuthiravattam Mental Hospital =

Coordinates: 11.25476°N 75.79948°E

The Government Mental Health Centre

Geography
- Location: Kuthiravattam, India

Organisation
- Care system: Public
- Type: Psychiatric
- Affiliated university: National Institute of Mental Health and Neurosciences (NIMHANS)

Services
- Emergency department: 24 Hours
- Beds: 474

Links
- Lists: Hospitals in India
- Other links: List of hospitals in India

The Government Mental Health Centre at Kuthiravattam near Kozhikode, India is a hospital for the mental patients. The government provides free treatment and food for the mentally ill patients here.

== Recent developments ==
Recently the Kerala Government has announced a detailed project report (DPR) for a Rs.20-crore renovation project has been prepared, Minister for Panchayats and Social Justice M.K. Muneer said. "What we are planning is a comprehensive renovation project modelled after the National Institute of Mental Health and Neurosciences (NIMHANS) in Bangalore," Dr. Muneer said.

== See also ==
- RaoSahib Dr. Ayyathan Gopalan (First Indian Superintendent and Psychiatrist of Kuthiravattam mental hospital)
- Pottammal
- Govindapuram
