= Ayathan Janaki Ammal =

First female doctor in Kerala

Dr. Ayathan Janaki Ammal
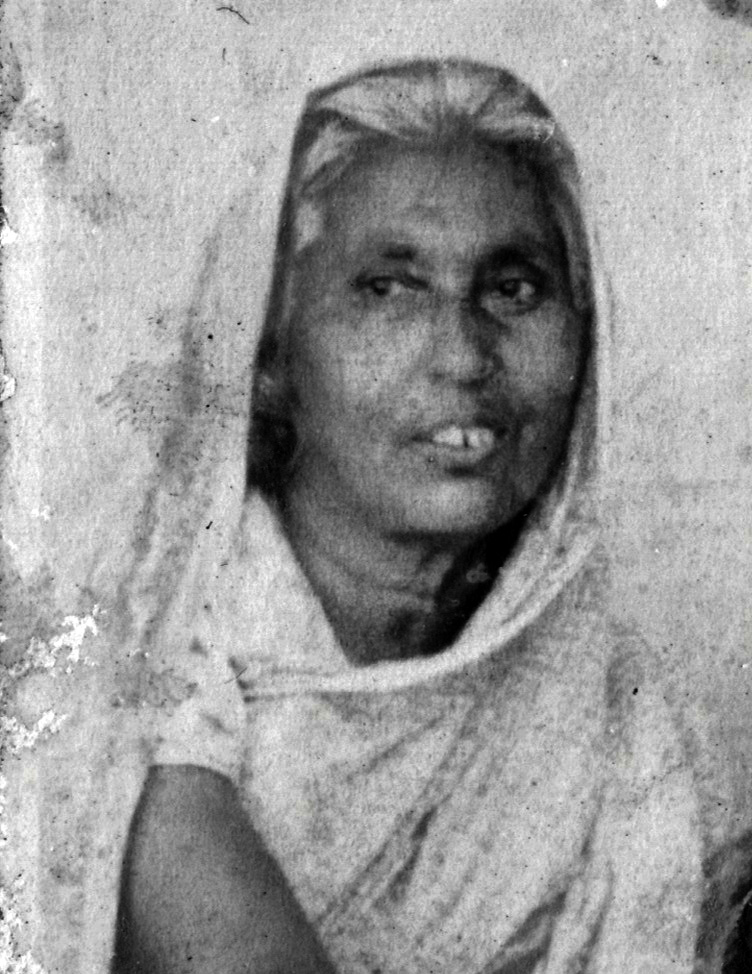
- Born: Ayathan Janaki; 1878; Thalassery, British India
- Died: 1945 (aged 66–67); Madras, Madras Presidency
- Resting place: Santhi Gardens, Ayathan Family Cemetery, Calicut
- Education: Madras Medical College
- Occupations: Doctor, Surgeon, Medical school professor, Social activist
- Known for: First women Doctor and Surgeon of Kerala, First Malayali Lady Doctor & Surgeon, First Female doctor from Thiya community.
- Parents: Ayathan Chandhan (father); Kallat Chirutha Ammal (mother)
- Relatives: Dr. Ayathan Gopalan
- Family: Ayathan family
- Awards: Best Doctor Award (from British Government)

Dr. Ayathan Janaki Ammal (1878–1945), also known as Ayyathan Janaki Ammal, was the first female doctor and surgeon in Kerala.
