= Pandit Karuppan =

Indian poet and dramatist

Pandit K.P. Karuppan
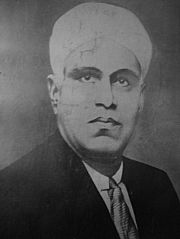
- Born: 24 May 1885; Cheranalloor, Kochi, India
- Died: 23 March 1938 (aged 52)
- Occupations: Poet, dramatist, social reformer

Pandit Karuppan was a poet, dramatist, and social reformer who lived in Kerala, India.He was called the "Lincoln" of Kerala for steering socio-economically and educationally backward communities to the forefront.

Pandit Karuppan emerged from Ernakulam of Cochin State. Hailing from Dheevara community of inland fishermen who engaged in localised fishing in backwaters and rivers, as a relentless crusader against untouchability and social evils .Karuppan became a Sanskrit scholar, poet and dramatist of repute. As the first human rights activist of the Cochin State, he used his literary skill and organizational ability to combat illiteracy, social injustice, casteism, and superstitions. He campaigned for the empowerment of Dheevara Community.

== Early life ==
K.P. Karuppan (Kandathiparambil Paapu Karuppan) was born on 24 May 1885, at Cheranelloor, near Ernakulam into a lower middle class family of Dheevara fishermen community to Paapu (locally known as Atho Poojari) and Kochu Pennu. the family was known for its skills in toxicology and for treating snakebite victims.

The Malayalam meaning of Karuppan is "person of black colour", but Karuppan had a very fair complexion. The name Karuppan was given to him by a Tamil Gosai who was a family friend. He predicted that the boy would become a great scholar and suggested the name Karpan (meaning a learned person in Tamil), which later turned into Karuppan.

Karuppan's formal education began at the age of five under Azheekkal Velu Vaidyan, a relative. Subsequently, Vadakke Valath Appu Asan, a local guru, taught him Amarakosham, Sidhdharoopam and Sreeramodantham, the basics of Sanskrit. A prolific reader, Karuppan also read the Itihasas and Puranas. His first poem was Sthothramandaaram. The prodigy took his gurus by surprise when he wrote Lankamardanam at the age of 12 with slokas styled in Shardoolavikreeditham.

Karuppan studied Sanskrit Kavyas under Mangalappillil Krishnan Asan of Cherai and returned to Cheranelloor to study with Annamanada Rama Pothuval. There, as was the prevailing custom, upper-caste Hindu students did not allow him to sit along with them and hence he sat alone in a corner. He studied the Kavyas Makham and Nyshadham and Bhoja Chambu from Rama Pothuval. The most significant period of his education was at Kodungalloor. The Kodungallur Kovilakam was a place of learning, due to the resident luminaries.

== Adult life ==
Karuppan's famous work Jathikummi, which criticised the prevailing caste system, was written in 1904 during the period of his study at Kodungallur Kovilakam and it became popular among the poor. Jaathikkummi is a pioneering attempt in Malayalam literature questioning the caste system and untouchability. While Sree Narayana Guru, Kumaran Asan and Ayyankali worked for social changes in the Travancore State, the presentation of Jaathikkummi was the first step initiated in that direction in Cochin State by Karuppan, who was then a 19-year-old student. Kumaran Asan's Duravastha was published 10 years later. Though most of Karuppan's writings were in scholarly Sanskrit, Jaathikkummi employs simple, everyday Malayalam that illiterate people from the local communities were able to understand and propagate.

=== Teaching career ===
Karuppan's talents in Sanskrit came to the notice of Rajarshi Ramavarma Raja, the Maharaja of Cochin, who visited Kodungalloor to worship at the famous Thiruvanchikkulam Siva Temple. Bhattan Thampuran introduced Karuppan to the King. The Maharaja was impressed and invited Karuppan to his palace in Tripunithura. The meeting was a turning point for Karuppan. The Maharaja arranged for Karuppan's advanced study of Sanskrit under 'Sahridayathilkan' Rama Pisharody, the principal guru of the royal family. Karuppan studied 'Sidhantha Koumudi', 'Manorama' and 'Sahithee Darpanam' from Rama Pisharody. Soon Karuppan was appointed Sanskrit teacher at the St. Theresa's Convent Girls' High School in Ernakulam.

When Pandit Karuppan was appointed Sanskrit Teacher in the Caste Girls' High School at Ernakulam in 1912— a special institution exclusively for upper caste girls— there was vehement protest from upper-caste Hindus against his posting, and they were reluctant to send their girls to study under a low caste man. The Maharaja of Cochin over-ruled them and warned that girls unwilling to study under Karuppan would be sent out from the school, ending the protests. After leaving the staff of Caste Girls' High School, he joined the Victoria Girls' High School, Thrissur in 1918. Subsequently, he was posted at the Teacher Training School there. In 1921, he was again appointed to the Girls' High School, Ernakulam, which had by then dropped "Caste" from its name.

=== Legislative Council ===
During his second tenure at Girls' High School, in August 1925, he was nominated as a member of the Cochin Legislative Council to represent the hitherto disenfranchised classes, in recognition of his tireless crusade for their emancipation through writings and campaigns. As MLC, Karuppan presented their problems and grievances before the authorities arguing for better education, health and living conditions for them. He pressed the Government to establish a separate department for this purpose leading to the establishment of the department for the Protection of the Depressed Classes with the then Director of Public Instruction, Rao Sahib C. Mathai as ex-officio Protector and Karuppan as full-time Assistant Protector.

As Assistant Protector, Karuppan was instrumental in initiating several reforms for the progress of the depressed classes by starting schools and establishing colonies. He persuaded the Government to provide scholarships, fee concessions and a number of other incentives for the education of children from the depressed classes. He wrote Aacharabhooshanam to generate awareness among the depressed classes against superstitions, the book being printed and distributed free of cost to the public by the Government. The Depressed Classes Department was later renamed the Harijan Welfare Department.

Pandit Karuppan was instrumental in starting fishery schools under the re-organised Fisheries Department. The establishment of fish curing yards helped promote fisheries as an industry and improve living conditions among the fishing community. While serving as a director in the Cochin Central Co-operative Bank he urged fishermen and agricultural labourers to form co-operatives for progress through self-reliance.

When his three-year term on the Legislative Council expired, Karuppan was nominated for a second term but he requested that the Diwan give the post to some other member of the depressed classes. The Government appointed P.C. Chanchen, a Pulaya leader, as MLC and Karuppan tendered his resignation to make way for Chanchen.

Pandit Karuppan was then appointed as Secretary to the Elementary Education Committee and the Bhashaparishkarana Committee. In 1931, he assumed the newly created post of Superintendent of Vernacular Education of Cochin State. In 1932, he was appointed lecturer of Sanskrit at the Maharaja's College. During this time, Karuppan also served as chairman of the board of Examiners of the Madras University and as Member of the Municipal Council, Ernakulam.

=== Dramatic works ===
Baalakalesam is one of Pandit Karuppan's significant works and it was written as part of the shashtipoorthi celebrations of the Maharaja of Cochin in 1919 when Rao Sahib Nanperumal Chetty of Tamil Nadu organised a drama competition in the king's honour. Karuppan wrote the play under compulsion from guru Rama Pisharody in 10 days but, nervous and embarrassed to treat his beloved Maharaja as a character for the stage, Karuppan gave symbolic names to the characters in the drama. His creation was judged best and won the prize. It was named Baalaakalesam alluding to the State of Cochin as Queen Baala and the Maharaja as Kalesan her lord. The drama, dedicated to the Maharaja of Cochin, discussed the condition of the State before Kalesan became the King, and the progress the State achieved during his 16-year rule. The author did not forget to criticise the evils and atrocities suffered by people in the name of caste. Baalaakalesam was first staged in Maharaja's College, Ernakulam and Karuppan's friend Kottilil Narayana Marar, who was an upper caste Hindu, provided financial assistance to print the book.

The drama also carried suggestions for future reforms, like the formation of village panchayats, the constitution of a legislative council and the construction of a harbour at Cochin. After reading the drama's script, Sree Moolam Thirunal, the Maharaja of Travancore, presented a nine-jewelled gold ring (Navarathna Mothiram) to Karuppan. While submitting the copy of Baalaakalesam, Karuppan requested the Maharaja of Travancore to help students hailing from his community through education by providing them concessions in fees. The Maharaja promptly sanctioned a half-fee concession to all students of Dheevara community in Travancore State in appreciation of Karuppan's struggle for the betterment of backward communities.

The poem Udyanavirunnu was penned by Karuppan to reflect his angst at being not invited to a garden party that the Maharaja hosted for a visiting Governor of Madras in which all other MLCs except him was invited. Karuppan was left out on account of his low caste. The poem deals with the wounded self-respect of the excluded and when it was brought to the Maharaja's notice by T K Krishna Menon, the Maharaja decreed that all MLCs irrespective of caste or religion would be invited to official parties in the future.

The Maharaja of Cochin honoured Karuppan with the title Kavithilakan or Great Poet. Impressed by Karuppan, Kerala Varma Valiya Koil Thampuran of Travancore, known as Kerala Kalidasan for his translation of Shakunthalam into Malayalam, conferred the title of Vidwan upon him in 1913.

=== Social reforms ===
Karuppan decided to quit his teaching job to spend more time and energy spearheading social reforms. With this purpose, he organised the people of his own community into regional groups called sabhās. The main agenda of the sabhās was to persuade people to fight ignorance and superstitions. He put strong pressure on his fellow countrymen to become better educated and accept a healthier lifestyle. He organised the first Sabhā, Kalyanadayini Sabhā, at Anapuzha, Kodungalloor. Another Sabhā was Sudharma Sooryodaya Sabhā (Thevara), Prabodha Chandrodayam Sabhā (North Paravur), Araya Vamsodharani Sabhā (Engandiyoor), and Sanmarga Pradeepa Sabhā (Kumbalam) are other sabhās that Pandit Karuppan patronised. All these sabhas aimed to achieve the upliftment of the subaltern dalit castes.

He gave equal emphasis to the emancipation of other communities too as seen through the formation of the Cochin Pulaya Maha Sabhā for the uplift of the Pulaya community in 1913. Treated as untouchables by the upper caste Hindus, they were not allowed to assemble in any common place for meetings. To keep such meetings away from the eyes of the landlords, Karuppan asked the Pulayas to come in rowboats to the expanse of the Ernakulam backwaters and tie their boats together. There, he addressed them on a wooden-planked platform and charted out strategies for their emancipation by forming a Sabhā. This is known as 'Kayal Sammelanam'. Subsequently, Karuppan persuaded other communities like Velas, Sambavas, Ulladas and Kudumbis to form similar Sabhās to give momentum to their fight against social evils and discrimination.

The caste system in Cochin State barred the Pulayas were prohibited from entering the streets of Ernakulam or walking on important public roads. Karuppan waited for a favourable opportunity to tackle the issue. The Government organised an exhibition of agricultural products in which the Diwan, W.H. Bhore, was the guest of honour. Karuppan, during his speech, brought to the attention of the Diwan that the Pulayas, who had laboured hard to cultivate the agricultural products showcased in the exhibition, were not allowed to see the exhibition. Touched by the words of Karuppan, the Diwan ordered the organizers to allow the Pulayas to enter the grounds. Karuppan then took them to the exhibition site in a procession, having already asked them to arrive and wait in their country boats on the Vembanad lake. From that day, the Pulayas could enter Ernakulam Town and Karuppan had secured the right to walk on public roads for the Pulayas and other depressed classes.

=== Personal life ===
Pandit Karuppan had a special appreciation for Christianity whose missionaries had helped in Kerala's education by starting a number of educational institutions that admitted students without discrimination of religion or caste. When His Grace Alexis Henry Leppeesier (the representative of the Pope from the Vatican) visited Cochin in 1925, Karuppan wrote a welcome poem. Karuppan had also written poems highlighting the greatness of the Buddha and Prophet Mohammed. Aggrieved by the death of Sree Chattambi Swamikal, Karuppan wrote a condolence poem titled Samadhi Sapthakam.

Pandit Karuppan's wife Kunhamma hailed from Panambukad and the couple lived in Sahithyakudeeram, a house near the St. Teresa's College, Ernakulam, with their only daughter Parvathy.

Pandit Karuppan died of pleurisy on 23 March 1938 at the age of 53.

== Bibliography ==
Pandit Karuppan had many published works as a poet and dramatist including: Achara Bhooshanam, Arayaprasasthi, Baalakalesam, Baalodyanam, Bhaasha Bhaimeeparinayam, Bhanjithavimanam, Chanjenkutty, Chithralekha, Dheevara Tharuniyude Vilapam, Dhruvacharitham, Edward Vijayam, Jaathikkummi, Kairaleekouthukam, Kattile Jyeshtan, Lalithopaharam, Lankamardanam, Mahasamadhi, Mangalamala, Panchavadi, Sakunthalam Vanchippattu, Sangeetha Naishadham, Soudamini, Sree Budhan, Sree Ramavarma, Sugathasooktham, Thirunalkkummi, Udyanavirunnu, Ulukopakhyanam, and Vallorkkavitha.

His Sakunthala, Baalodyanam and Kairaleekouthukam were text books for school classes in Cochin State. Bhaasha Bhaimeeparinayam was Malayalam text book for the F.A.Examination of the Madras University.

== Library ==
The Pandit Karuppan Smaraka Grameena Vayanasala is a library founded in 1953 in Karuppan's native village of Cheranelloor. His nephew, A. K. Velappan, was instrumental in setting up the library as a memorial to his uncle.

The admirers of Pandit Karuppan have formed an organisation to promote his memory.

== See also (Social reformers of Kerala) ==
- Sree Narayana Guru
- Dr. Palpu
- Kumaranasan
- Rao Sahib Dr. Ayyathan Gopalan
- Brahmananda Swami Sivayogi
- Vaghbhatananda
- Mithavaadi Krishnan
- Moorkoth Kumaran
- Ayyankali
- Ayya Vaikundar
