= Ooruttambalam =

- suburb
- Country: India
- State: Kerala
- District: Thiruvananthapuram

Government
  - Body: Gram panchayat

Languages
  - Official: Malayalam, English
- Time zone: UTC+5:30 (IST)
- PIN: 695507
- Telephone code: 0471

Ooruttambalam is a locality near Nemom, a suburban area of Trivandrum, capital of Kerala, India.

== Geography ==
Ooruttambalam is 16 kilometers from Kerala State Road Transport Corporation's Central Bus Depot, Thampanoor, and City Depot East Fort.

Regular bus services connect other parts of the city. It is 4 kilometers from National Highway 66. The nearest towns are Balaramapuram, Kattakada, and Neyyattinkara.

The railway station is located 3 kilometers away and connects Ooruttambalam to Kanyakumari and Thiruvananthapuram Central.

Neyyar dam, a tourist destination, is 16 km away. Its canal passes through the town and the water is used for agriculture.

== History ==
In 1915, the Ooruttambalam Revolt (Nineteenth-Century Revolt) occurred under the leadership of Ayyankali. The same year, the Kallumala Agitation happened under the leadership of Ayyankali in the Perinad of Kollam. An attempt by Ayyankali to enroll a Pulayar girl in a government school led to violent acts perpetrated by upper castes against the community and eventually led to the burning of the school building. It became known as ‘Ooruttambalam Lahala’, and was followed by the first-ever agricultural strike in Indian history, fought for school admission.

== Temples ==
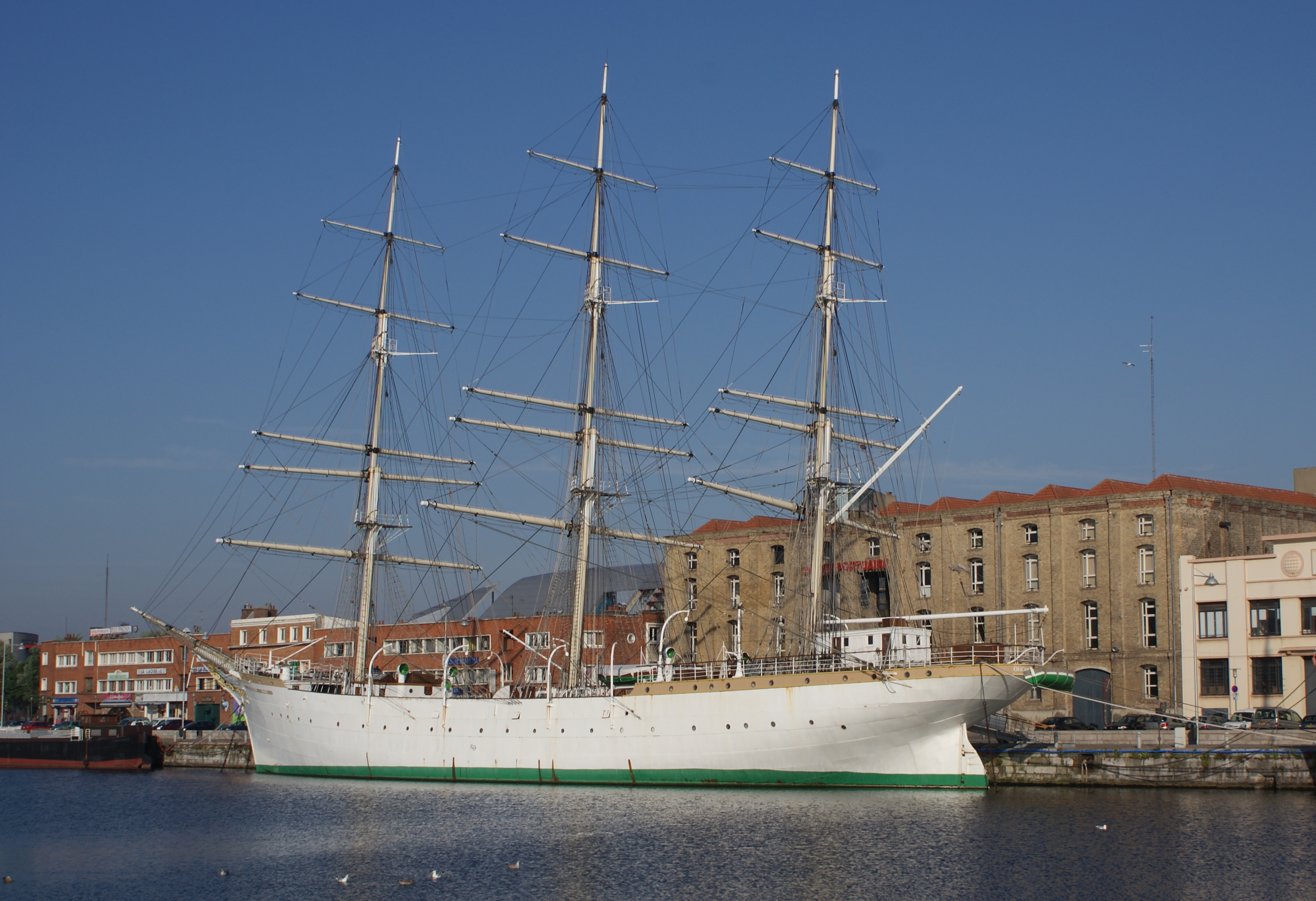
Ooruttambalam Parankimamvila Durgabhagavathi Temple

Ooruttambalam Ooruttambalam Parankimamvila Sree Durga Bhagavathy Temple is located near Ooruttambalam Market. Devotees from across the state visit. The ''Durga Pooja'' and ''Bhagavathy Pooja'' of the temple are famous. Atham mahothavam (Mahotsav) has been celebrated during the Malayalam month "Medam" on the day of the Malayalam nakshatra "Attam" every year. People from all walks of life participate in the festival, including Hindus, Christians, and Muslims. Its major attraction is the "Thalappoli Ghoshayathra" (cultural procession), conducted during the last day. The procession starts from the temple and moves through velicode, pallithara and reaches Govindamangal Mahavishnu temple. From there it moves to Govindamangal Junction, Ooruttambalam Junction, Neeranamkuzhy Junction and comes back to the temple. The procession is accompanied by cultural programs such as Panchavadyam (orchestra of five instruments), Chnda Melam (orchestra of cylindrical percussion instrument, Nadaswaram (wind instrument used to produce classical music - the world's loudest non-brass acoustic instrument), and Nadaswaram Kettiya Gajaveen (elephant wearing the golden elephant caparison). The elephants carry Thidambu. It is taken out of the temple as Ezhunnallathu by the temple priest. This occasion is the only occasion on which the goddess comes out of the temple in full alankaras in Ulthasava Thidambu.

Valiyarthala Thampuran Temple is an ancient temple. Oorttu Festival, is very popular in this temple.

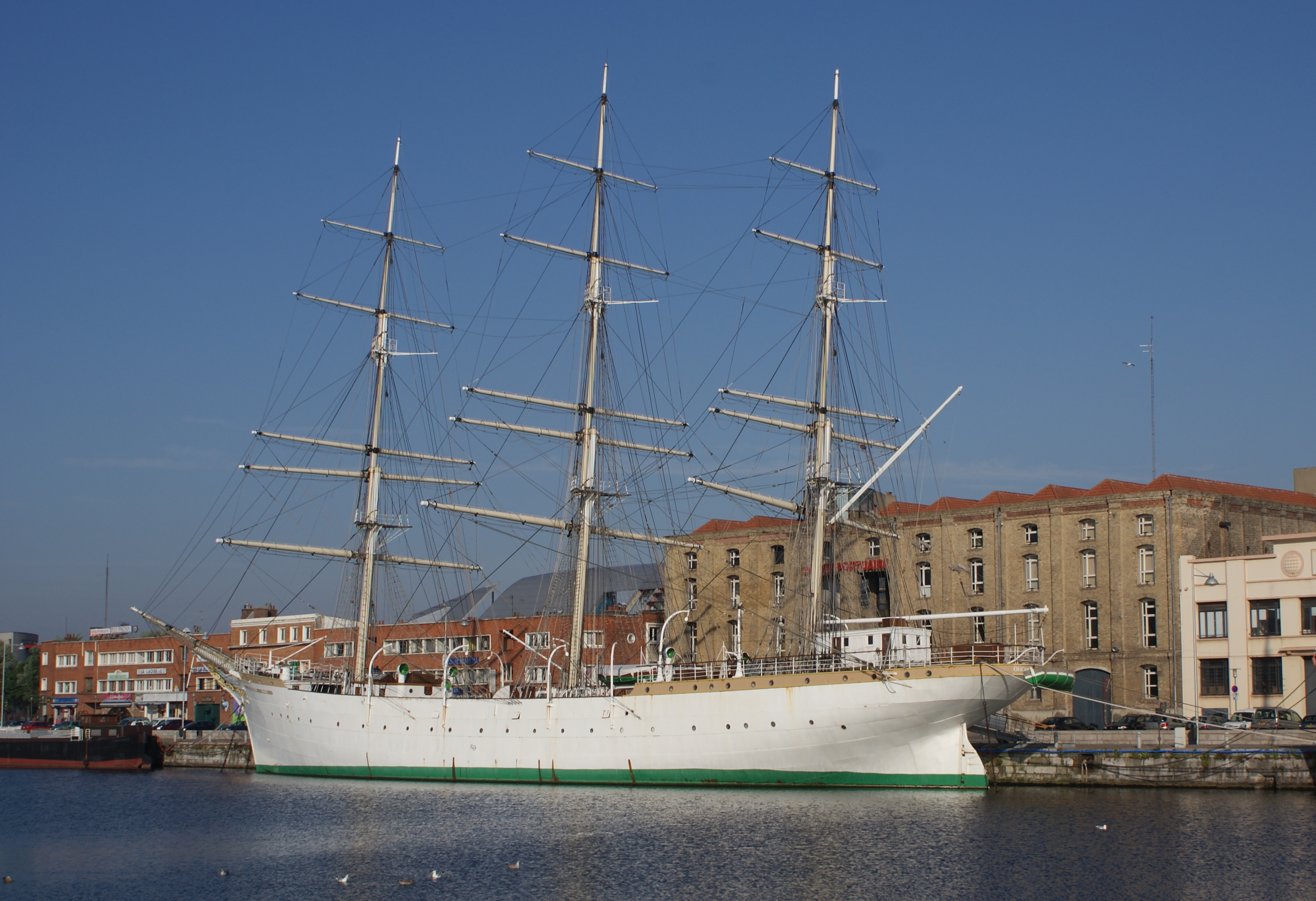
Ooruttambalam Parankimamvila durga temple

== Infrastructure ==
The post office, bank, and the village office are near Ooruttambalam junction.

== Education ==
Two schools are there. A high school and an LP School are near Good Shepherd Church Velikkodu, built by Portuguese missionaries in 1917.

Sree Saraswathy Vidyalayam, CBSE is a subsidiary of Bharatheeya Vidya Nikethan, teaching students from Pre-KG to Plus Two.

== Government ==
The local government office (Panchayat office), a local branch of the main police station, is 1 km from Ooruttambalam.

== Economy ==
Krishnapuram is a good agricultural place in Ooruttambalam. Farmers work full-time in banana plants and coconut plants.

Ooruttambalam Service Co-operative Bank is situated near the post office.
