= Mayyanad railway station =

Railway station in Kerala, India

Mayyanad
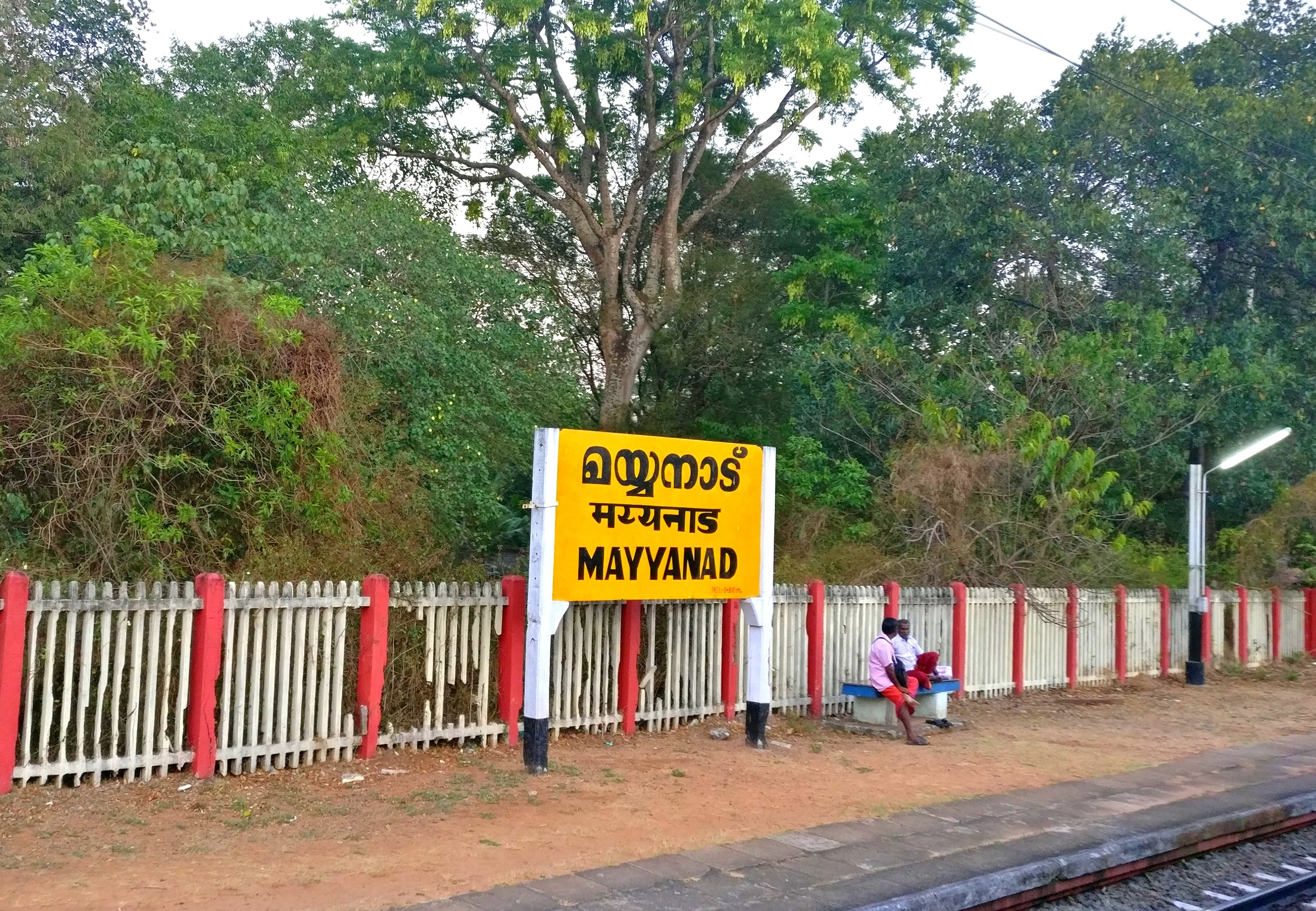
- Mayyanad railway station

General information
- Location: Mukkom Road, Mayyanad, Kollam, Kerala; India
- Coordinates: 8.8381°N 76.6478°E
- System: Express train & Passenger train station
- Owner: Indian Railways
- Operator: Southern Railway zone
- Line: Kollam–Thiruvananthapuram trunk line
- Platforms: 2
- Tracks: 2

Construction
- Structure type: At–grade

Other information
- Status: Functioning
- Station code: MYY
- Zone(s): Southern Railway zone
- Division(s): Thiruvananthapuram
- Fare zone: Indian Railways

History
- Opened: 1918; 108 years ago
- Electrified: 25 kV AC 50 Hz
Route map
Location
- Location within India Location within Kerala

Mayyanad railway station (station code: MYY) is an NSG–6 category Indian railway station in Thiruvananthapuram railway division of Southern Railway zone. It is an Indian railway station situated at Kollam, Kerala.

== Administration ==
Mayyanad railway station falls under the Thiruvananthapuram railway division of the Southern Railway zone of Indian Railways.

== Background ==
It is a 'E-Class' railway station. The annual passenger earnings from Mayyanad railway station during 2011–2012 was ₹952,675 (equivalent to ₹1.8 million or US$19,000 in 2023).

== Line and location ==
The station is about 9.5 km (5.9 mi) away from Kollam city and falls on the Kollam–Thiruvananthapuram trunk line.

== Services ==
Three pairs of express trains have halts at Mayyanad railway station.

== See also ==
- Mayyanad
- Paravur
- Kollam Junction railway station
- Paravur railway station
- Karunagappalli railway station
