= Sadhujana Paripalana Sangham =

Indian charity

- Abbreviation: S.J.P.S
- Formation: 1907
- Founder: Ayyankali
- Type: Community based organization
- Headquarters: Trivandrum
- Location: Kerala

The Sadhujana Paripalana Sangham (Sadhu Jana Paripalana Sangham) (SJPS) was established in 1907 by social reformer Ayyankali to campaign for education for Dalits in Kerala with the support of government of Travancore, British India., first starting Sadananda villasam Venganoor, next SJPS
