= Sree Moolam Popular Assembly =

First popularly elected legislature in India

The Sree Moolam Popular Assembly in the state of Travancore was the first popularly elected legislature in the history of India.

Its predecessor legislative council was formed in Travancore in 1888 with eight appointed members. Sri Mulam Thirunal Ramavarma, who became maharajah of Travancore in 1886, established it in an order issued on 30 March 1888. In 1898, the strength of the council was increased to 15, comprising nine officials and six non-officials.

In 1904, a lower house called the Sree Moolam Popular Assembly (known in the local language as Sree Mulam Praja Sabha) was formed with 88 members to provide for increased participation of the people in the administration. Its membership was limited to representatives of landlords and merchants. Although not a legislature, it was intended to give the people an opportunity to bring to the notice of the government their remonstrances, wishes, or grievances, and to make government policies and measures better known to the people. The members of the Assembly were not elected but chosen, two from each taluk, by the District heads from among landholders who paid an annual land revenue of not less than Rs.100, and landholders or traders whose net annual income was Rs.6000 or above.

In 1905, the Sree Moolam Popular Assembly began to have elected members. Out of the new strength of 100 members, 77 were to be elected and 23 were to be nominated. Voting right was limited to persons who paid an annual land revenue of not less than Rs.50, or whose net income was not less than Rs.2000. University graduates with not less than ten years of standing, and having their residence in the respective Taluk, were also eligible to vote.

In 1907, the Assembly was conferred the right to elect members of the upper Legislative Council. The Upper Council had 15 members—nine officials and six non-officials. In 1919, the Council was remodelled raising its strength to 25, out of which eight were elected members. In October 1921, the total strength of the Council was further raised to 50, with the majority elected members.

In 1932, the Legislative Council of Travancore and Sree Moolam Popular Assembly were replaced with a formal bicameral system consisting of an Upper House, the Travancore Sri Chitra State Council, and a Lower House, the Sree Moolam Assembly. This bicameral system continued to function until September 1947 when it gave way to a constituent assembly that later led to the merger of Cochin state and its accession to India following independence.

== Members ==
Among the Sree Moolam Popular Assembly members were:

- K.T. Michael Karippaparambil-Kanjirappally, (Michael Vakkil) Sreemoolam Praja Sabha and M.L.A 1944
- Dominic Thomman Karippaparambil, (Valia Vakkil) Sreemoolam Praja Sabha 1914 and 1920
- K.M. Thomas Karippaparambil, (Kochu Vakkil) Sreemoolam Praja Sabha 1920
- Jacob Thomas Karippaparambil, Sreemoolam Praja Sabha 1926
- Dominic Joseph Karippaparambil, MLC Sreemoolam Assembly 1931 and 1944
- Vallakalil J Oommen, (Oommachen), MLC Sreemolam Praja Sabha 1920–1931. He is the grandfather of former chief minister Oommen Chandy.
- Ayyankali: He became a member of the Prajasabha on 5 December 1911 and held that position for 25 years
- H.B. Mohamed Rowther
- C.A. Angoor Meera Rowther, Member of Sree Moolam Assembly 1903
- Perakatte Kuruvilla Devasia, Member Sree Moolam Praja Sabha 1907 for Meenachil
- Perekkattu Curuvilla Mathen Mappila Member Sree Moolam Praja Sabha 1911. 1912 & 1921 for Meenachil
- Ninan Xavier Palakunnel Nadakkapadom MLC(1927)
- C. Kesavan
- E. V. Krishna Pillai
- Adv. S. Ramanatha Pillai (S. R), elected twice in 1927 and 1930, representing the Changanassery constituency
- Iype Thoma Kathanar, 1904, 1905, 1911, 1914, 1915, Thiruvalla Taluk
- J. Thomas Kayalackakom
- K. C. Mammen Mappillai
- Kumaran Asan
- M. K. Mackar Pillay
- Muloor S. Padmanabha Panicker
- T. K. Madhavan
- T. M. Varghese
- Kochu Hassan Kunju Bahadoor
- Pallithanam Luca Matthai
- Poykayil Yohannan
- Pattom A. Thanu Pillai
- N. J. Kuncheria
- Alummottil kochu kunju channar
- Sahib Bahadur Athan Ahamed: Kunnathunad Taluk Group II
- A.R Raman Pillai: Parur Taluk
- Narayana Pillai Krishna Pillai: Kunnathunadu Taluk Group I
- Aipe Antony: Muvattupuzha Taluk
- Kavarikulam Kandan Kumaran, member from 1915 to 1932
- K.C Eapen, member 1907, 1924, 1926 to 1930
- Komalezhathu Kunjupillai Chekavar (He was the maternal uncle of T. K. Madhavan
- Kunjan Velumban, member 1930
- K. Govindappillai (Kankku Govindappillai) Karthikappalli Taluk
- K.C Shadananan Nair, Kizhkulam (Vilakki thala Nair)
