= Brahmananda Sivayogi =

Atheist, writer, and social reformer of Kerala, Sanskrit teacher (1852–1929)

Brahmananda Swami Sivayogi
- Born: Karatt Govinda Menon; August 26, 1852; Kollankode, Palakkad, British India
- Died: September 10, 1929 (aged 77)
- Other names: Alathur Sivayogi, Alathur Swami, Siddha Muni, Purusha Simham
- Occupations: Spiritual guru, social reformer

Karatt Govinda Menon (26 August 1852 – 10 September 1929), better known as Brahmananda Swami Sivayogi, was an Indian social reformer, atheist, and writer from present-day Kerala. He founded the Ananda Maha Sabha in 1918. He proposed Anandadarsam or Anandamadham (religion of bliss).

He was titled "Brahmananda Swamikal", recognising his spiritual and literary knowledge by Ayyathan Gopalan, a social reformer and propagandist of Brahmo Samaj in Kerala and founder of the Sugunavardhini movement. Mentor of Swami Sivayogi, and as an honor for writing a poem Brahmasankeerthanam (to be sung during Brahmo prayer meetings) on the request of Gopalan and all Brahmosamajists of Malabar, and also for extending his untiring services done through Brahmo Samaj. He started Sidhasramam in Alathur in 1891. He propounded the theory that anandam (happiness or bliss) should be the touchstone of any human activity. The movement he spearheaded played an important role in the Kerala reformation movement.

== Early life ==
Brahmananda Swami Sivayogi was born on 26 August 1852 at Kollankode, a small village in the Palakkad district of Kerala. He was the ninth son of Nani Amma of the "Karatt" family and Kunhikrishna Menon of Kunnath Ravunnyarath at Vallengi. He had nine brothers and one sister. In his childhood, Brahmananda Sivayogi was called Govindankutty. His mother was a devout Nair lady who strictly followed the tenets of religion. He lived in his matrilineal house along with his parents as per the existing custom of matrilineal families. His parents and other family members naturally influenced him towards conservatism. Govindankutty accepted all the traditional life of a Nair boy. He visited temples, worshipped individual gods, and was involved in prayers, offerings, and other religious customs. He was sent to a nearby school, the Kollankode Board Elementary School. Several changes had occurred in the field of education in Kerala during this time. But the majority were unaware of the importance of English education. Sanskrit scholars were respected everywhere. The students usually had gone to the residence of Sanskrit scholars to master the language. The well-known scholar Padmanabha Sastri was the Sanskrit Guru who gave guidance to Govindankutty. His father, Kunhikrishna Menon, sent his son to Koodalloor Sastrikal for a higher course in Sanskrit. He studied grammar, poetry, and poetics from his guru. His grasping power was extraordinary. He had expressed his poetic genius during this time. By this time he became well versed in Hindu scriptures and the Tamil language. There was nothing spectacular or any sign of his later beliefs of rationalism or atheism in his early life or childhood.

After his Sanskrit studies, Karat Govinda Menon moved to Ernakulam and joined there as a Sanskrit teacher. His short stay at Ernakulam and acquaintance with a lot of people having different cultures broadened his outlook. He was greatly influenced by the non-idolatry and atheistic principles of Dr. Ayyathan Gopalan and Brahmo Samaj, His attitude towards God, religion and tradition was undergoing a slow change by then.

Accordingly, he married Thavukutty Amma of Mukkil Maruthur at Vadavannur. He had to look after his own family and started his career as a Sanskrit Munshi at Calicut Native High School, which is now known as Ganapat High School, his stay at Kozhikode was a turning point in his life. During this time a branch of Brahmo Samaj was functioning at Kozhikode which was an organisation for social reforms, led by Dr. Ayyathan Gopalan, a great social reformer of Kerala during those times. Govinda Menon participated in the discussions organised in Brahmasamajam. He was a frequent visitor at Brahmasamajam and wrote the book Brahmasankeerthanam on the request of Dr. Gopalan and Brahmosamajists of Malabar. Dr. Ayyathan Gopalan honored him as "Brahmananda Swami" recognising his spiritual and literary knowledge. He had the opportunity to listen to their discourses. It naturally enriched his knowledge. Their rejection of the practice of idol worship influenced him considerably. He also got proficient in English during the stay at Calicut. He learned that caste was an unwanted social institution that was potentially harmful. He slowly emerged from the traditional Hindu society. Philosophically, he moved away from the Hindu fold. He resigned from Calicut school and joined Board Middle School at Alathur as a Sanskrit Munshi. By then he was widely recognised by the name "Brahmananda Swamikal".

== Social reform activities ==
Gradually he started practicing Rajayoga. During this time, he embraced saintly life and attire completely, he named his residence at Alathur as Siddhashramam. Sivayogi stopped his teaching profession in 1907 and devoted himself entirely to the activities concerned with his spiritual mission. He established a spiritual institution named Siddhasramam in 1907 at Alathur. Brahmananda Swami Sivayogi's revolutionary activities were accelerated after he settled down at Alathur. He started Anandamatham (Religion of Bliss) and made a tour in some parts of Kerala to propagate the ideals of Ananda matham‘ and carried on a consistent struggle against the anti socio-religious practices. His wife Thavukuttyamma became his true disciple and got the title as Yoginimatha.

Brahmananda Swami Sivayogi was the one who titled V.K.Gurikkal as Vagbhatananda seeing his oratorial abilities. As a social reformer, Brahmananda Swami Sivayogi never appeared on stages and addressed huge masses. His main intention was to enlighten the people and teach them to liberate themselves from superstitions and ignorance. Even though he was a Sanskrit scholar, he preferred simple Malayalam, the vernacular language, to make the common people aware of their real status in the society. Brahmananda Swami Sivayogi believes that superstitions and evil customs influenced the common people due to their ignorance of Rajayoga. The religious rivalry and misery can be put to an end by the knowledge that the original universal religion of mankind is "Ananda" alone. Under the leadership of direct disciples of Sivayogi like V.K. Kombi Achan, Sivaramakrishna Iyer, G. Krishna Iyer, T.K.P. Anandayogi, C. Kannan Nair, Sooryanarayana Sharma, P.A. Anandan, Vagbhatananda, N.K. Anandan, Adv. Rama Varier started propaganda of Sivayogi's principles.

Like all Renaissance leaders, he emphasized the importance of education, especially that of women's education. Sivayogi brought and read many scholarly, authoritative texts. He learned and interpreted the Sanskrit texts and borrowed important passages to highlight and cement his ideology. The authoritative truths he proved, with examples and logic, viz., the triumph of eternal bliss, real happiness is the peacefulness of the mind, the prime victory is the victory over the mind, non-violence is the foremost form of righteousness, rites like sacrifices create ignorance, happiness is innate, etc., resulted in a denial of blindly followed principles and actions and the formation of new progressive thoughts and principles. On its basis, the caste system, the practice of untouchability, idolatry, the temple-oriented customs, animal sacrifice, superstitions,institutionalized and institutionalized religion were opposed, and the awareness that all men are equal was developed. As a rational intellect, he stood for the rescue of poor, neglected, and ignorant laymen and elevated them to a universal brotherhood.

Swami Sivayogi died on 10 September 1929 at the age of 77.

== Books by swami ==
=== In Malayalam ===
- Sivayoga Rahasyam – 1895
- Rama Charithram - 1895
- Sthri Vidya Poshini – 1899
- Sidhanubhuthi – 1903
- Jnanakummi – 1903
- Mokshapradeepam – 1905
- Anandakalpadrumam – 1905
- Ananda Suthram – 1910
- Rajayoga Parasyam – 1916
- Vigraharadhana Khandanam – 1916
- Ananda Vimanam – 1916
- Anandamatha Paraysyam – 1919
- Anandakkummi – 1920
- Ananda Gaanam – 1923
- Anandadarsam – 1927
- Anandadarsamsam – 1928

(Translation of most popular books are available in English, Hindi and Tamil.)

== Books about Swami ==
- Biography of Brahmananda Sivayogi written by K Bheeman Nair "Asathyathil ninnu sathyathilekku"(അസത്യത്തിൽ നിന്ന് സത്യത്തിലേക്ക് )
- Biography of Brahmananda swami Sivayogy by A K Nair
- Brahmananda Swami Sivayogi by Pavanan
- Brahmananda Swami Sivayogi and His Selected Works by P.V. Gopalakrishnan

== See also (Social reformers of Kerala) ==
- Rao Sahib Dr. Ayyathan Gopalan
- Vagbhatananda
- Mithavaadi Krishnan
- Moorkoth Kumaran
- Narayana Guru
- Padmanabhan Palpu
- Kumaran Asan
- Ayyankali
- Ayya Vaikundar
- Pandit Karuppan

== Bibliography ==
- Brahmananda Swami Sivayogi - Pavanan (Department of Cultural Publications, Government of Kerala, Thiruvananthapuram -14, Kerala)
- Kerala Navothanam - Oru Marxist Veekshanam - P. Govindappilla (Chintha Publishers, Thiruvananthapuram-695001)
- Saragrahi Monthly - Various issues
