= Ayathan Gopalan =

Indian physician, writer, social reformer (1861–1948)

Rao Sahib Ayathan Gopalan
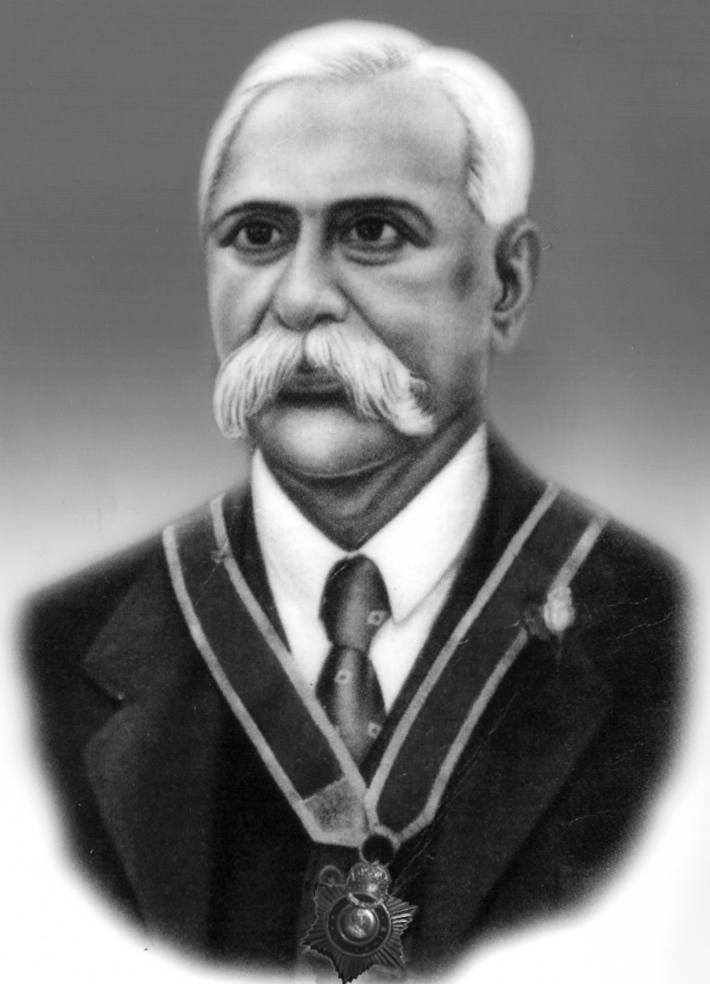
- Born: Ayathan Gopalan; 3 March 1861; Tellicherry, Malabar District, Madras Presidency, British India (present day Kannur, Kerala, India)
- Died: 2 May 1948 (aged 87); Calicut Shanthi Ashram, Malabar District, Province of Madras, Dominion of India (present day Kozhikode, Kerala, India)
- Resting place: Santhi Gardens (Ayathan family cemetery, Calicut)
- Other names: Darsarji, Darsar Sahib
- Education: Madras Medical College
- Occupations: Doctor; professor; social reformer
- Notable work: Bhramodarma Malayalam (the Bible of Brahmo Samaj); Saranjiniparinayam; Susheeladukham (musical dramas)
- Movement: Brahmasamaj(1898), Sugunavardhini movement (1900), Depressed classes mission (1909)
- Spouse: Kallat Kausallya Ammal (m. 1878–1930)
- Children: 5
- Relatives: Ayathan Janaki Ammal (sister)
- Awards: Rao Sahib

DR. Rao Sahib Ayathan Gopalan (3 March 1861 – 2 May 1948), popularly known as Darsarji and Darsar Sahib ("Darsar" means "doctor", derived from Latin word "docere" for doctor), was an Indian doctor, surgeon, professor, writer, philanthropist, social reformer, and Renaissance leader from Kerala. He is the founder of the Sugunavardhini movement (1900) and Depressed classes mission (1909) and also the leader and propagandist of Brahmo Samaj (1893) in Kerala. He denounced idol worship and fought to end those social practices in Kerala that he thought were unethical. Among his followers were Brahmananda Swami Sivayogi, Vaghbatananda, and Brahmavadhi P. Kunhiraman. Gopalan titled P. Kunhiraman as "Brahmavadhi" and Sivayogi as "Brahmananda Swami".

He was awarded and honoured by the British government with the highest civilian award and title, the "Rao Sahib", for his services. The formation of the Sugunavardhini movement, Depressed classes mission and Brahmosamaj were a part of the Kerala reformation movement.

== Life ==
Gopalan was born at Anjarakkandy, Tellicherry (now Thalassery), as the first son of Ayathan Chandhan and Kallat Chirutha Ammal. His youngest sister, Ayathan Janaki Ammal, was the first woman doctor and surgeon in Kerala.

He attended Anjarakkandy Elementary School, Government Brennen College and Mission High School. He later joined Madras Medical College on 19 September 1884. He read about the Raja Ram Mohan Roy's Brahmo Samaj. Joined Brahmo Samaj and engaged in its social reform activities and became an active executive member of the General Committee of Calcutta Brahmo Samaj. He participated in the committee's annual conferences at various locations across India, along with Brahmo leaders such as Keshub Chandra Sen, Debendranath Tagore, Sivanath Sastri, Rabindranath Tagore, and R. G. Bhandarkar. In 1888, he obtained a medical degree with honours and entered into government service as the first doctor in Kerala.

Gopalan married Kallat Kausallya Ammal on 30 December 1894. Ramakrishna Gobal Bhandhakar, a Brahmo leader and social reformer at that time, conducted the wedding at the Madras Brahmo Samaj.

== Social reform activities ==
=== Establishment of Brahmosamaj branches in Kerala ===
Gopalan worked as a doctor, chief surgeon, and superintendent at several hospitals in South India. He returned to Kerala in 1897 and joined the Calicut Lunatic asylum (now the Kuthiravattom Mental Hospital) as its first Indian superintendent. Meanwhile, caste and racial discrimination, malicious practices, and social injustices were prevalent in Kerala, and atrocities against women and children were at their peak. He instituted Brahmosamaj in Kerala for the first time in 1893.

Gopalan extended his reform ideologies and propagated his reform activities by establishing the first branch of Brahmo Samaj on 17 January 1898 at Calicut. To conduct Samaj's meetings and prayers, a separate brahmomandir (lit. "hall")— was opened to the public on 1 October 1900. The brahmomandir was inaugurated by Mana Vikraman Ettan Thampuran, the Zamorin King of Calicut. This is situated in Jail road, Chinthavalap at Calicut. Now Dr.Ayathan Gopalan Memorial school is being run in the premises of Calicut Brahmosamaj. This is the only school left in Kerala which run under the patronage of Brahmosamaj under Calicut Brahmosamaj Society. Branches of Brahmosamaj at Thalassery and Palakkad was formed subsequently. In 1924 a branch of Brahmosamaj was established at Alappuzha and a separate Brahmomandir was constructed in 1928 at Kommadi, Poonthoppu.

=== Sugunavardhini Movement and Depressed Classes Mission ===
In the year 1900, Gopalan and wife Kausallyaammal initiated the Sugunavardhini Movement and extended his social reform activities. Through this movement, he worked to foster human values in children, attract children to his social activities, protect the rights of women, and provide free education to girls and marginalised sections of society. He established the Lady Chandhawarkar Elementary School at Calicut with the intention to educate girls and the Dalit (Harijan) communities.

In 1909 he established the Depressed Classes Mission for the upliftment of Harijan (Dalit) communities in Kerala, under which he established schools and provided free education for downtrodden sections of the society. He established a boarding school at Kallai, Calicut, One day and night school at Palakkad, and a day school at Thalassery under the Depressed Classes Mission. The Brahmosamajists of Palakkad and Telicherry took care of the day to day activities of these schools.

He founded "Ayathan Weaving mill's" for giving secure jobs to the underprivileged section's and also the "Ayathan Clinic and Dispensary" where free treatment's were given for the poor and the underprivileged. Around 1920's a Medical school started by the British Government named the Medical School, Mananchira (Now training institute function here) This was a branch of Madras Medical College and Dr. Ayathan Gopalan was appointed as the Professor of this Medical School. He also served as the registrar of Special Marriage act and was given the rank and adored as the honorary Magistrate by the British Indian Government.

=== Impact of Sugunavardhini, Depressed Classes Mission and Brahmosamaj in Kerala ===
In addition to supporting and educating women and the underprivileged, their movement led reforms to oppose idolatry; promote and conduct Misra Vivaham (inter-caste marriages) and Misra Bhojanam (inter-dining); spread women's education; maintain gender equality; eradicate untouchability, caste and racial discrimination; and conduct mass prayers and communion debates. He led many strikes such as the Chevayur road samaram, Parayanchery paraya colony samaram, Puthiyara road samaram to name a few. Gopalan also participated in the Thali Road strike (Samaram at Calicut).

The hymns for prayers sung at Brahmo Samaj were composed by Gopalan and are compiled in his book Keerthanaratnamala. He conducted several inter-caste marriages at Brahmo Samaj and worked to promote non-idol worship. "Brahmodharma", better known as the Brahmosamaj Bible, was written in Bengali by Maharshi Debendranath Tagore and was translated by him into Malayalam. He promoted his reformist ideologies by conducting dramas, public awareness campaign, and writings. The Sugunavardhini Movement and Brahmo Samaj were composed mostly of professionals and intellectuals, including Brahmananda Swamisivayogi, Vagbhatananda Guru, and Brahmavadi P. Kunhiraman, all with a more secular approach to reform. He raised his children, grandchildren, and all his followers as a good man, without raising them to live under a particular race, religion, or creed. It is for this reason that their name has been retained as "Brahmo" without a caste name. All of his children are intermarried (Intercaste marriage) and were married according to Brahmasamaj rituals.

Rabindranath Tagore described Ayathan Gopalan as the "Raja Ram Mohan Roy of Kerala" during the annual general conference of the Brahmo Samaj.

On 4 June 1917, Gopalan was honoured by the British Government with the highest civilian award and title, Rao Sahib, for his social and humanitarian services.

He died on 2 May 1948.

== Works ==
Gopalan translated the Bible of Brahmo Samaj, Brahmodharma, which was initially written in Bengali by Maharshi Debendranath Tagore, to Malayalam in 1904. He wrote the first Biography book of Raja Ram Mohan Roy in Malayalam and also wrote songs and keerthanams to be sung during Brahmo Samaj prayer meetings. He propagated his reform ideologies through drama, public awareness, and his writings. Saranjiniparinayam(1899)(musical drama), Susheeladukham(1903) (musical drama), and Plaguefarse(drama) were among his famous dramas performed throughout by PSV Natya sangam in Kerala for many years. His other literary contributions are listed below:

- Raagamaalika(1894) first book
- Brahmadharmam
- Saranjiniparinayam (musical drama)(1899)
- Susheeladukham (musical drama)(1903)
- Plague Farse (drama)
- Gaanamaalika
- Grihadharma Geethamrutham
- Keerthanaratnamala
- Brahmamatham
- Rammohunroy (Harikatha) (Biography of Raja Ram Mohan Roy)
- Madhaaikyam
- Madhavum Guruvum
- Madhavan
- Aaradhanayude Randu Padikal
- Brahma Madhavum Ithara Madhangalum
- Jaathi
- Vivaahageethangal
- Jai Britannia
- Yeshu Daivamayirunnuvo!
- British Bharana Mahathmyam
- Ente Amma (memoir of mother Kallat Chiruthammal)

== See also ==
- Ayyathan Janaki Ammal
- Vagbhatananda
- Brahmananda Swami Sivayogi
- Mithavaadi Krishnan
- Moorkoth Kumaran
- Kallingal Madathil Rarichan Moopan

== Bibliography ==
- Maharshi Vaghbhatananda Gurudevar, by Swami Brahmavrithan
- A Survey of Kerala History Prof. Sreedharan Menon .A. (1967). Kottayam: Sahitya Pravarthaka Co-operative Society [Sales Dept.]; National Book Stall.
- Prof.Sreedharamenon .A. (1987) Kerala History and its Makers, Kottayam; National bookstall
- Kurup, K. K. N. (1988), Modern Kerala: Studies in Social and Agrarian Relations, Mittal Publications, ISBN 9788170990949
- Kurup (1988), p. 94
- Kurup, K. K. N. (September 1988). "Peasantry and the Anti-Imperialist Struggles in Kerala". Social Scientist. 16 (9): 35–45. doi:10.2307/3517171. JSTOR 3517171.
- Biography of Brahmanada Sivayogi written by K Bheeman Nair Asathyathil ninnu sathyathilekku(അസത്യത്തിൽ നിന്ന് സത്യത്തിലേക്ക്)
- Biography of Brahmananda Swami Sivayogy by A K Nair
- Brahmananda Swami Sivayogi by Pavana
- Journal of Indian history, University of Kerela Press, 2001 p270
