= Muhammad Abdul Shakoor =

M. A. Shakoor
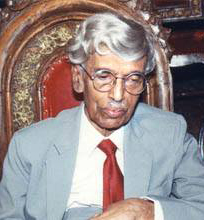
- M. A. Shakoor in the 1990s
- Born: November 1911; Travancore Princely State, British India
- Died: January 2001 (aged 89); Karachi, Pakistan
- Spouse: Akhtar Quraishi
- Parent(s): Mariyam Beevi (Mother); Muhammad Kunju (Father)

Muhammad Abdul Shakoor (November 1911 – January 2001) was a Pakistani journalist who worked as the senior most Assistant Editor of Dawn and the London Correspondent of the Pakistan Times.

== Early life and family ==
Shakoor was born in November 1911, into a prominent and influential Muslim family Poonthran. Shakoor was the first of four children born to Muhammad Kunju Kayalpuram and Mariyam Beevi. He had one brother: Abdul Shakir and two sisters: Dr. Rahma and Hasana. His uncle, Vakkom Moulavi, was a visionary, social reformer, scholar, educationist, writer, journalist and the founder of Swadeshabhimani newspaper. His father, Muhammad Kunju Kayalpuram, was a writer, Muslim scholar and the publisher of the cultural journal "Muslim" brought out by Vakkom Moulavi. Shakoor matriculated in Trivandrum and graduated in first division from the University of Madras. He joined the Aligarh Muslim University in 1939 and did his MA in English literature in first division and also obtained a law degree.

== Career ==
After doing a short course in journalism at the Aligarh University, he joined the 'Orient Press of India,' the first Muslim news agency in the subcontinent, in 1942. In October of the same year, he joined Dawn on the advice of Nawabzada Liaquat Ali Khan. He had served as the editorial staff of Dawn, Delhi under the editorship of Pothan Joseph. Two years later, in 1944, he left Dawn and joined as the Assistant Editor with the Morning News, Calcutta. Seven months later, in 1945 he joined the Statesman as a subeditor. In 1946, Shakoor brought out his own daily ‘Comrade’, which could not survive beyond a few months for lack of finances. When Progressive Papers Ltd in Lahore launched the daily 'Pakistan Times', he was invited to work for it. Shortly thereafter, he came over to Karachi to join the 'Pakistan Herald.' The daily was soon renamed Dawn and he served it till 1954, his longest stint in any particular news organization.

In 1950, he became the first president of the newly founded Pakistan Federal Union of Journalists.

In and around 1954, when the Muslim League government became obsessed with the ‘danger of communism’ and launched a witch-hunt against progressive elements in the country. Shakoor along with some other colleagues and political workers, was arrested and sent to jail. It was perhaps, the most challenging time of his career when he visited China and later while reporting the Vietnam War. He was initially denied permission to visit by his editor Althaf Hussein, Shakoor took up the challenge by visiting China by taking two weeks leave. His editor Althaf Hussein, being close to the powers-that-be, was reported to have had a hand in the arrest of Shakoor. During his imprisonment, he suffered a great deal and after his release, he left the country and fled to London out of utmost frustration and despair.

Shakoor then settled in London and worked for the 'Pakistan Times'. He did free-lancing for some time and took up teaching. Later he returned to Karachi. It was Shakoor who translated Thakazhi's Randidangazhi into English under the title 'Two Measures of Rice', first serialized in the 'Illustrated Weekly of India' and later brought out by Jaico Books. He had written several articles on religion, politics and literature.

== Later years and death ==
He died in January 2001.

== See also ==
- Vakkom Moulavi
- Justice Habeeb Mohamed
- Vakkom Majeed
