= CGK Reddy =

Indian activist, freedom fighter and politician (1921–1994)

Cattamanchi Gopala Krishnamoorthy Reddy
- Born: 12 January 1921; Kattamanchi, Chittoor, Madras Presidency
- Died: 26 December 1994 (aged 73); Chennai, Tamil Nadu, India
- Other names: CGK Reddy, Kattamanchi Gopala Krishnamoorthy Reddy
- Occupations: Activist, freedom fighter and politician
- Known for: Deccan Herald, The Hindu, Prajavani, Press Institute of India, Baroda dynamite case
- Notable work: Baroda Dynamite Conspiracy: The Right to Rebel
- Father: CSV Reddy

Cattamanchi Gopala Krishnamoorthy Reddy (12 January 1921 – 26 December 1994), commonly referred to as CGK Reddy, was an Indian activist, freedom fighter and politician. He was the first general manager of the Deccan Herald, a business manager at The Hindu, editor of Prajavani, founder director of the Research Institute of Newspaper Development (RIND), in Taramani, Chennai (now the Press Institute of India) and former president of The Indian Newspaper Society. During the Emergency, he collaborated closely with George Fernandes, notably as part of the Baroda dynamite case. He helped to found the People's Union for Civil Liberties, and served as President of the Karnataka chapter.

== Early life ==
CGK Reddy was born on 12 January 1921 at Kattamanchi, near Chittoor, Andhra Pradesh, to CSV Reddy. He was a nephew of Cattamanchi Ramalinga Reddy. After completing his schooling from High School, Chittoor, he briefly attended Pachaiyappa's College, Chennai.

On graduating from college, CGK Reddy joined the Training Ship Dufferin as an engineering cadet and was then posted as fifth engineer in SS Chilka. On 11 March 1942, on the way to Padang, the ship was torpedoed by a submarine. After a week on the sea in a lifeboat with a few others, he was captured by the Japanese military near Nias. From there, he was sent to Singapore, and then the Indian Swaraj Institute, Penang. After being recruited by the Indian National Army, he was planted as a spy in India, along with 19 others, including Vakkom Abdul Khader. CGK Reddy was caught and arrested by British troops soon after crossing at Teknaf, and he was imprisoned for three years.

In 1946, at the age of 25, he gave up his job as a marine engineer and became a political activist. He, along with Asoka Mehta, published Our Shipping. CGK Reddy's involvement with the Deccan Herald led to T. S. Satyan and Pothan Joseph joining the Deccan Herald.

He married Vimala on 7 November 1947, and they had 3 sons, Manmohan, Ramalinga and Rammanohar. Professor Amulya Reddy from the Indian Institute of Science was his nephew.

== Political career ==
CGK Reddy unsuccessfully stood in the 1951 Lok Sabha elections from the Bangalore North constituency under a Socialist Party ticket. He was elected to the Rajya Sabha from Mysore State by the Socialist Party in 1952 and served as an MP until 1954. He served as the Chairman for the Mysore State wing of the Socialist Party.

CGK Reddy financially supported Shantaveri Gopala Gowda during his campaign for the 1952 Mysore State Legislative Assembly election.

== Emergency ==
During the Emergency, CGK Reddy worked closely with George Fernandes. He acted as a representative of George Fernandes for the 1975 meeting of the Bureau Socialiste Internationale at Brussels. He was arrested in 1976 in what became known as the Baroda dynamite case. After the Janata Party won the 1977 general elections, he was released from prison. CGK Reddy wrote a detailed account of the Baroda Dynamite Case in his book Baroda Dynamite Conspiracy: The Right to Rebel.
