= Satyen Chandra Bardhan =

Indian revolutionary (1916–1943)

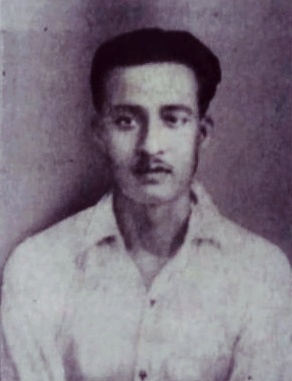
- Born: 1916; Bitghar, Comilla district, Present day Bangladesh
- Died: 10 September 1943 (aged 26–27); St. George Fort, Madras, British India
- Cause of death: Execution by hanging
- Other name: Kanu
- Occupations: Soldier in Indian National Army, under Subhas Bose.

Satyen Chandra Bardhan (1916–1943), commonly known as Kanu, was an Indian Bengali revolutionary and a soldier in Indian National Army led by Netaji Subhas Bose. He was a trained radio communicator. He, along with Vakkom Abdul Khader, Anandan and Fauja Singh, was hanged in Madras Central Jail on September 10, 1943. All four walked up to the gallows, singing and raising the slogan of Vande Mataram.

== Early life and career ==
Satyen was born in the Bitghar area, Brahmanbaria, Comilla District, which is now in present-day Bangladesh. His father's name is Dinesh Chandra Bardhan. Not much is known or documented about his childhood, but in his early life, he had been working in the Post and Telegraph Department in Malaya when it was overrun by the Japanese. He found himself stranded in Singapore for some time. He joined the Indian Independence League in 1941, and was sent to Penang to receive training connected with the war. With the formation of Azad Hind Fauj or the Indian National Army, Satyen joined it in 1942. He was given special training in radio transmission by both Indian and Japanese experts, besides training in fighting etc.

== Revolutionary activities ==
The Indian Independence League took a very bold step in sending their own men to the interior of their Motherland, India, to work from within a revolt and to transmit news to the League 'outside'. They were twenty in number, divided into four groups: two began by land and two by sea to get into India. One batch landed at Tanur, in Malabar Coast and was composed of Vakkom Abdul Khader and Anandan and three others. The second batch of five men including Satyen reached Kathiawar Coast. They came by submarine and were transferred to a rubber boat five miles off the land. Fighting against the waves it took them twenty-one hours to reach the shores of India. Satyen had a transmitter with him, in the operation of which he had been known to be adept. On landing before they could find a safe hideout they were noticed by the men on the shore and wereed upon with suspicion. The police were informed. Satyen and his comrades, were arrested within a few hours of their landing. The other two groups that started by land, with the first reaching Chittagong and the second group consisting of Fauja Singh, reaching Assam. But they were also eventually arrested by the police. The first batch of five men including Abdul Khader, that landed at Tanur, was aereo later arrested.

== Trial ==
After all of the twenty men including Abdul, Satyen Bardhan, Fauja Singh and Anandan were arrested, they were then removed to Fort St. George, India at Madras in due course of time. They were even tortured in Madras Fort in order to reveal all the secrets about their intention to enter India, which was their own Motherland. Of the 20, one became an approver and the other 19 were tried in early 1943. The accused were placed on trial for waging war against the King, and acting as enemy agents under the Indian Penal Code and War Emergency Ordinance on 8 March 1943. The judgment was delivered on 1 April 1943. Satyen Bardhan, Abdul Khader, Fauja Singh, Anandan and one Christian named Boniface Pereira, were sentenced to death. But the Christian, Boniface Pereira, escaped death on the strength of a successful appeal. Boniface was later sentenced to five years of imprisonment.

== Death ==
The soldiers of the Indian National Army, Satyen Bardhan and his four comrades Abdul Khader, Fauja Singh, and Anandan, were executed in the Madras Penitentiary on September 10, 1943, at twelve o'clock midnight. Almost the whole night preiorto the executions, the prison reverberated with the song Vande Mataram. With great courage, each of them, Abdul Khader, Satyen Bardhan, Fauja Singh and Anandan, ascended the steps to the gallows while raising the slogan of Vande Mataram, which meant ''Hail my Motherland''. Satyen Bardhan in his last letter to his brother and maternal uncle, wrote:-

“I have got nothing to say or write to you. I feel so happy and proud that God has ordained me to sacrifice my life at the altar of my Motherland. Opportunity, if ever, comes handy, please try to take revenge on our enemy. The sacrifice of life for the cause of freedom is nothing new to Bengalis. - your fortune favoured, Kanu”

== Legacy ==
The wind carried the message of the four martyrs, Satyen, Abdul Khader, Fauja Singh and Anandan, to every corner of India. It did not take long before India achieved its independence on 15 August 1947 on the ashes of these martyrs. A small memorial is built at Travancore. C.G.K. Reddy, who was one of the twenty men arrested, narrates how his four comrades Abdul, Satyen, Fauja Singh and Anandan sacrificed their lives on gallows:-

“As the nooses were slipped round their necks and just before the trap door opened below them, their last words were Bharat Mata ki Jai. That morning I shed in uncontrollable tears, all fear of death. The death of these four comrades, martyrs, convinced me anew that life has no special significance and is worth little, unless it is lived in honour, and with a sense of commitment. Their courage even on the gallows was recounted to me after the War by a Deputy Commissioner of Police who was a witness to the execution. He said he had never witnessed such exemplary bravery in the face of impending, certain death.”

In 1993, on the 50th anniversary of their execution, Reddy took the lead in organising a memorial event in Trivandrum and then Vakkom. All the survivors of the original 20 and/or members of their families from across India came to Vakkom to honour the four martyrs. Though in 1998, a stamp was issued in the honor of the executed Abdul, Satyen, Fauja Singh and Anandan. But for the rest of the country, these martyrs have disappeared from the collective memory.
