= Kulandeshwara Temple =

Hindu temple in India

Bala kamakshi sametha Kulandeshwara Temple

Religion
- Affiliation: Hinduism
- District: Chittoor district
- Deity: Lord (Shiva)

Location
- Location: Kattamanchi
- State: Andhra Pradesh
- Country: India

Kulandeshwara Temple, located in the Chittoor district of Andhra Pradesh, India. It is dedicated to the deity Kulandeshwara (the Hindu god Shiva). It dates back to the 11th century. It is located in Kattamanchi. Chola Period.
