= Andhra University =

Public university in Visakhapatnam, Andhra Pradesh

- Crest of the University
- Other name: AU
- Motto: Tejasvi nāvadhītamastu (from the Taittiriya āraṇyaka of the Yajurveda, 8.0.0)
- Motto in English: "May the Divine Light illuminate our studies."
- Type: Public
- Established: 1926; 100 years ago
- Founder: Sir C. R. Reddy
- Accreditation: NAAC (A++)
- Affiliations: UGC
- Chancellor: Governor of Andhra Pradesh
- Vice-Chancellor: G. P. Rajasekhar
- Location: Visakhapatnam, Andhra Pradesh, India; 17°43′45.38″N 83°19′17.61″E
- Campus: Urban
- Website: andhrauniversity.edu.in

University rankings

General – international
- QS (Asia) (2024): 651-700
- Times (World) (2024): 1501+
- Times (Asia) (2024): 501-600

General – India
- NIRF (Overall) (2024): 41
- NIRF (Universities) (2024): 25

Engineering – India
- NIRF (2024): 90

Pharmacy – India
- NIRF (2024): 34

Andhra University is a collegiate public state university located in Visakhapatnam, Andhra Pradesh, India. It was established in 1926 by the Andhra University Act, 1925 (Madras Act II of 1926). It is graded as an A++ institution by National Assessment and Accreditation Council, receiving a score of 3.74 on a scale of 4. The Main campus is ranked 4th among public state universities and 23rd among Indian universities by the NIRF 2025 Rankings.

== History ==
King Vikram Deo Verma, the Maharaja of Jeypore, Orissa was one of the biggest donors of the university. He donated lands and two million rupees for the establishment of the university which was set to be shifted elsewhere by the education authorities due to lack of funding. Furthermore, he provided ₹1 lakh annually to the university, an approximate figure of ₹17 lakhs between 1930s - 1940s.a The liberal king was conferred an Honorary Doctorate degree from the university. The Jeypore College of Technology and Science in Andhra University was founded by Maharajah Vikram Deo.

== University emblem ==
The university emblem was designed by Sri Kowta Rammohan Sastri with the guidance of Cattamanchi Ramalinga Reddy. The rising sun represents the university itself, and the radiating light rays represent its faculties of study. The lotus is the seat of Goddess Lakshmi (prosperity) and Saraswati (knowledge). The swastika is the symbol of benediction. An ocean is the vast region of knowledge. The two serpents represent the seekers and custodians of wisdom.

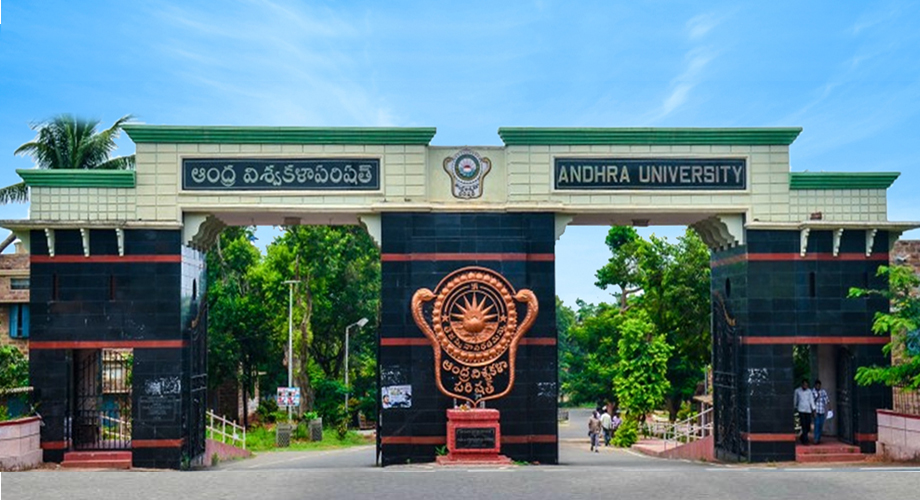
Andhra University, Visakhapatnam

== Faculties and departments ==
- Andhra University College of Arts and Commerce (established 1931)
- Andhra University College of Engineering (established 1955)
- Andhra University College of Engineering for Women (established 2010)
- Dr. B. R. Ambedkar College of Law (formerly AU College of Law)(established 1945)
- Andhra University College of Pharmaceutical Sciences (established 1951)
- Andhra University College of Science and Technology (established 1931)
- Andhra University School of Distance Education (established 1972)

== NAAC accreditation ==
National Assessment and Accreditation Council accredited Andhra University as A++ grade in 2023, one of three university that year to receive the grade. The university received a CGPA score of 3.74, and the A++ status will be sustained for seven years till 8 November 2030.

== Notable alumni ==
=== Artists and writers ===
Name	Class year	Notability	References
Lakshmi Nandan Bora		Assamese writer	
P. Lalita Kumari	1972 MA	Telugu writer	
Ipsita Pati		Odia and Bollywood actress	
Trivikram Srinivas		Film director and screenwriter	
P. Susheela		Playback singer	

=== Politicians, civil servants, and lawyers ===
Name	Class year	Notability	References
Konamaneni Amareswari		Former Judge of Hyderabad High Court	
Kambhampati Hari Babu		15th Governor of Mizoram and former MP from Visakhapatnam	
G. M. C. Balayogi		12th Speaker of the Lok Sabha	
Jasti Chelameswar	1976	Former Judge of the Supreme Court of India	
Kothapalli Geetha		Former MP from Araku	
Dr. Madhu Gottumukkala		Acting Director, Cybersecurity and Infrastructure Security Agency	
Negeri Lencho	2011 PhD	Former Minister for Communication Affairs, Government of Ethiopia	
G. Ramanujulu Naidu	1951	Former Judge of Hyderabad High Court	
Venkaiah Naidu		13th Vice President of India	
K. Padmanabhaiah		Former Home Secretary of India	
Raghu Rama Krishna Raju		Deputy Speaker Of Legislative Assembly, Government OF Andrha Pradesh, Member of Parliament, Lok Sabha from Narsapuram	
Pavani Parameswara Rao		Senior Advocate at the Supreme Court of India	
Varanasi Subramanyam		Maoist politician	

=== Others ===
- Satya N. Atluri, Mechanical Engineering (1959–1963), recipient of the Padma Bhushan Award for 2013 in science & engineering
- Neeli Bendapudi, 18th president of the University of Louisville in Louisville, Kentucky, US, president elect of Penn State University
- B. M. Choudary, inorganic chemist, Shanti Swarup Bhatnagar laureate
- Undurti Narasimha Das, immunologist, Shanti Swarup Bhatnagar laureate
- Kunchithapadam Gopalan, geochronologist, Shanti Swarup Bhatnagar laureate
- Chennupati Jagadish, applied physics 1977–1980, Companion of the Order of Australia
- Pilli Alfred James, public administrator
- S. Rao Kosaraju, Computer Science (1959–1964), founder of the Kosaraju's algorithm, which finds the strongly connected components of a directed graph
- Kolluru Sree Krishna, geophysicist, Shanti Swarup Bhatnagar laureate
- C. M. Prasad, psychiatrist
- N. S. Raghavan, Electrical Engineering 1959–1964, co-founder of Infosys
- Anumolu Ramakrishna, former Deputy Managing Director of Larsen & Toubro and Padma Bhushan recipient
- B. L. S. Prakasa Rao, statistician, Shanti Swarup Bhatnagar laureate and National Science Foundation Fellow
- Barry Ramachandra Rao, space physicist, Shanti Swarup Bhatnagar laureate
- C. R. Rao, statistician, National Medal of Science laureate
- G. S. R. Subba Rao, natural product chemist, Shanti Swarup Bhatnagar laureate
- Grandhi Mallikarjuna Rao, Mechanical Engineering, founder and Chairman of the GMR Group, an infrastructure enterprise
- Neelamraju Ganga Prasada Rao, plant breeder, popularly known as the "father of hybrid sorghum", Shanti Swarup Bhatnagar recipient
- B. S. Daya Sagar, geoengineering (1988–1994), only Asian recipient of Georges Matheron Lectureship Award from International Association for Mathematical Geosciences
- B. L. K. Somayajulu, geochemist, Shanti Swarup Bhatnagar laureate
- Adusumilli Srikrishna, organic chemist, Shanti Swarup Bhatnagar laureate
- Duvvuri Subbarao, economist and former Reserve Bank of India Governor
- Ravi Vadlamani, chartered accountant
- Srinivasan Varadarajan, chemist and Padma Bhushan awardee

== See also ==
- List of universities in India
- Universities and colleges in India
