= Swadeshabhimani Ramakrishna Pillai =

Indian journalist and political activist (1878–1916)

Swadeshabhimani. Ramakrishna Pillai
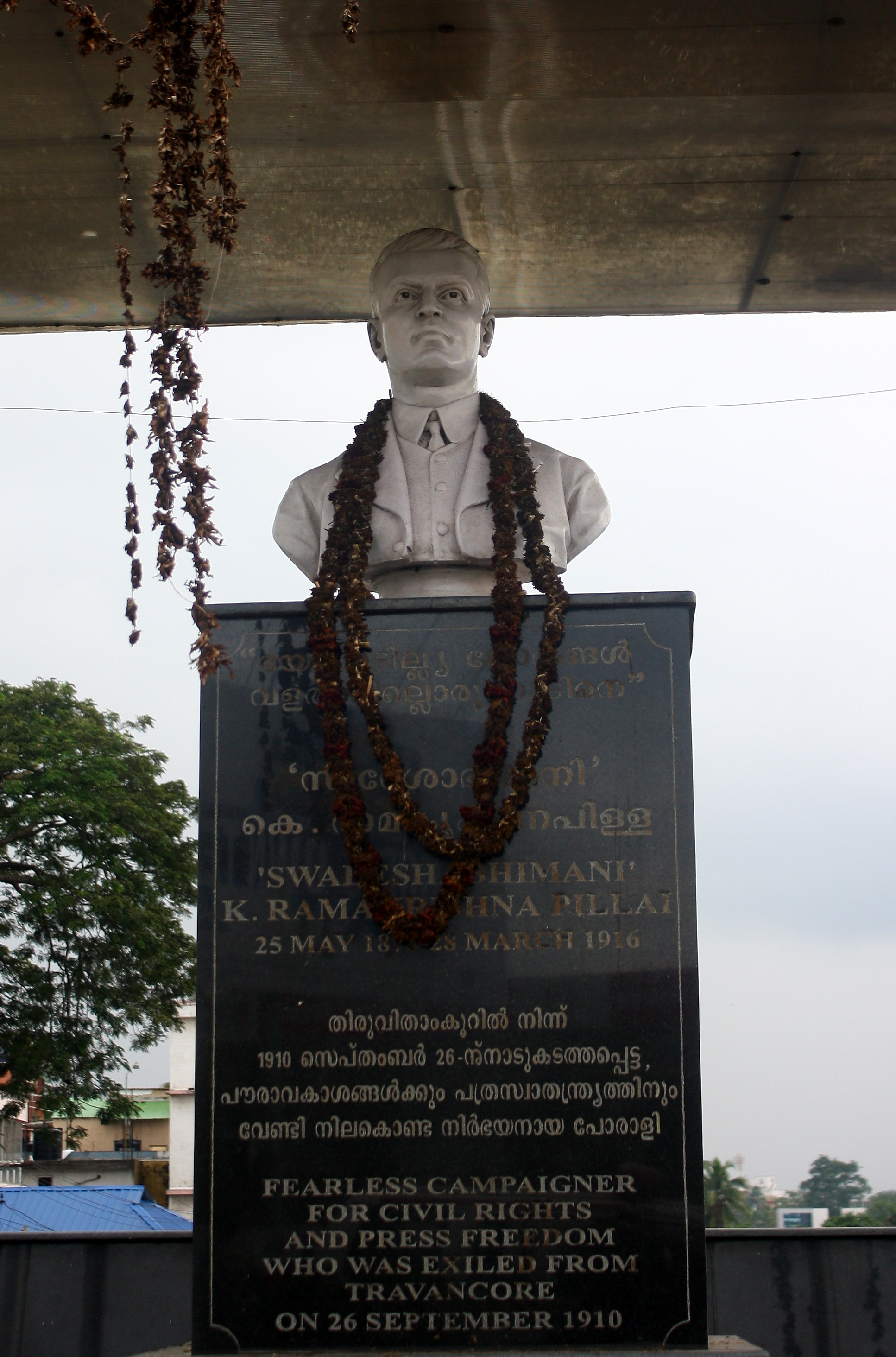
- Bust of Pillai in Thiruvananthapuram
- Born: 25 May 1878; Neyyattinkara, Travancore
- Died: 28 March 1916 (aged 37); Kannur
- Occupation: Editor of Swadeshabhimani
- Spouses: Nanikutti Amma, B. Kalyani Amma
- Children: K.Gomathy Amma, K. Madhavan Nair
- Parent(s): Narasimhan Potti, Chakkiamma

K. Ramakrishna Pillai (1878–1916) was an Indian nationalist writer, journalist, editor, and political activist. He edited Swadeshabhimani (The Patriot), the newspaper which became a potent weapon against the rule of the British and the erstwhile princely state of Travancore (Kerala, India) and a tool for social transformation. His criticism of the Diwan of Travancore, P. Rajagopalachari and the Maharajah led to the eventual confiscation of the newspaper. Ramakrishna Pillai was arrested and exiled from Travancore in 1910. Vrithantha Pathra Pravarthanam (1912) and Karl Marx (1912) are among his most noted works in Malayalam, Vrithantha Pathra Pravarthanam being the first book on journalism in Malayalam and Karl Marx, the first ever biography of Karl Marx in any Indian language. But it has been alleged that he plagiarized the biography from an essay, "Karl Marx: A Modern Rishi", by Lala Hardayal, published in 1912 March issue of the Modern Review, published from Kolkata (Ramachandran, Grandalokam, January 2018).

== Early life ==
Ramakrishna Pillai was born in Athiyanoor (Arangamugal in Neyyattinkara Taluk of Travancore) on 25 May 1878 (ME: 1053 Edavam 16). He was the youngest son of Chakkiamma and Narasimhan Potti, a temple-priest.

The patriarch of the family (Thekkekod veedu) had once saved the life of Prince Marthanda Varma from his enemies. When Marthanda Varma became king or Maharaja of Travancore, he gifted the family 50-acre (200,000 m^{2}) of land, a 12-room mansion and certain privileges in the Krishna temple in Neyyattinkara. Ramakrishna Pillai was born over a century later.

Following the matrilineal Nair tradition, Ramakrishna Pillai spent much of his boyhood with his maternal uncle, Advocate Keshava Pillai. He had his early education at Neyyattinkara English Medium School and Rajagiyamahapadashala, the Royal school, Thiruvananthapuram. He was a shy and silent student. Kattupana Naganathaiyer, K. Velupilla and R. Keshavapilla were his early teachers. Ramakrishna Pillai utilized his less restricted life in Thiruvananthapuram to acquaint himself with new books, newspapers, new places and new friends. He passed his matriculation exam at the age of 14.

== Journalism ==
While studying for F. A., Ramakrishna started taking a keen interest in newspapers and journalism. An avid reader, he read almost every newspaper published from Travancore, Malabar, and Kochi States. During this time, he also gained the friendship and guidance of many literary legends and editors like Kerala Varma Valiya Koil Thampuran, Adithya Das, A. R. Raja Raja Varma, Ulloor S. Parameswara Iyer, Pettayil Raman Pillai Asshan, Oduvil Kunhikrishna Menon and Kandathil Varghese Mappillai. This inspired him to write articles for newspapers. His excessive passion for writing and newspapers, earned the wrath of his uncle and family. He passed the F. A. exam in 1898 and wanted to go to Madras for his BSc degree. However, on the directives of his uncle, he joined a B. A. degree course at University College, Trivandrum.

Ramakrishna Pillai and other newspaper enthusiasts had felt the need for a Malayalam newspaper. Kerala Darpanum and Vanjivibhujhika were already being published since 1900. Though his friends and well-wishers persuaded him to take up the editorship of Kerala Darpanum, it was difficult to manage studies and the editorship of a newspaper. Due to the resistance of his uncle Keshava Pillai, Ramakrishna had to leave home to take up a job. He passed the B. A. Malayalam degree with first rank and received the Keralvarmamudhra, an honorary award for academic excellence.

Ramakrishna Pillai began writing strongly against age-old malpractices and ill-customs of those days. He believed in action rather than words. He challenged customary practices by marrying Nanikutti Amma from Thoopuveetil, Palkulangara, Thiruvananthapuram, a woman from a lower sub-caste of the Nair community in 1901. A relative of Nanikutti Amma, Shri Prameshvaran Pillai, was the owner of Kerala Darappanum. Later, however, Ramakrishna Pillai and Prameshvaran Pillai got into litigation.

In 1901, Kerala Darappanum and Vanjivibhujhika merged to form Keralapanjhika. Keralapanjhika was owned by Marthanada Thampi. Ramakrishna Pillai was editor of the newspaper from 1901 to 1903. During this time, he traveled around the state of Travancore to gather a first-hand account of the people of Travancore and their problems. In February 1903, he resigned from Keralapanjhika. However, he continued to write articles in Nasranideepika and Malayali newspapers. In 1904, he moved to Kollam with his family to work as the editor of Malayali. He wrote editorials on the rights and duties of the people of Travancore. He also spoke at conferences held in Cherthala and Paravur Taluks about the ills and malpractices rampant in society.

In 1904, his wife Nanikutti Amma died. During that period, literary discourses and letters brought Ramakrishna Pillai close to B. Kalyani Amma. Later they were married.

== Swadeshabhimani ==
Abdul Khader Moulavi, popularly known as Vakkom Moulavi, was the owner of the journal called Swadeshabhimani and C P Govinda Pillai, the editor. Ramakrishna Pillai took over as the editor of the journal in January 1906. Ramakrishna Pillai and his family thus shifted to Vakkom in Chirayinkil Taluk, where the office of the newspaper and the printing press were located. In July 1907, the office of Swadeshabhimani was moved to Thiruvananthapuram and the family moved to Thiruvananthapuram. Though Vakkom Moulavi continued to own the paper, he had given Ramakrishna Pillai total freedom to run the newspaper. They never had any legal or financial contracts between them. Yet, Moulavi provided all the financial aid to set up the press in Thiruvananthapuram. Ramakrisha Pillai also started a woman's magazine called Sharadha, a student's magazine called Vidhyarthi and another magazine named Keralan.

P. Rajagopalachari, the then Diwan of Travancore, was the centre of attacks of the newspaper. The paper accused the Dewan of immorality and corruption. But "the most serious thing against the Swadeshabhimani," wrote the Dewan, "has always been the remarkable persistence with which it preached the gospel of government by the people, and the exhortation which it held out to the people of Travancore to unite and demand self-government." He also attacked the kingship of the Maharaja of Travancore:

"The monarchs believe and force others to believe that they are God's representatives or incarnations. This is absurd. Did God create a special kind of dog to be the king of dogs, or a special kind of elephant to rule over all elephants?"

Swadeshabhimani's pen moved against corruption in the state and injustice in the society. He irritated the Maharajah Moolam Thirunal himself by criticizing the large expenses incurred by the Royal consort, the Panapillai Amma, by constructing private palaces and publicly celebrating the wedding of the daughter of the Maharajah.

On 26 September 1910, Swadeshabhimani newspaper and the printing press were sealed and confiscated by the Indian Imperial Police. Ramakrishna Pillai was arrested and banished from Travancore to Thirunelveli in Madras Province of British India. The superintendent of police, F S S George (a British officer), Inspector R Achuthen Pillai, Inspector B Govinda Pillai and Inspector Pichu Aiyangar, carried out the arrest, without an arrest warrant. The police escorted him till Thirunelveli. The Kingdom of Travancore itself was a princely state under the Madras Presidency, then. Ramakrishna Pillai's family joined him later once he moved to a rented house in Madras. Editorships of newspapers like Kochi and Malabar came to be offered to him during the time, but he chose to stay in Madras.

Many nationalists and Indian newspapers reacted to the arrest and banishment of Ramakrishna Pillai and the banning of the paper. However, countering the king and the British Government that overruled the king, was not easy. Yet, early in the first half of the twenties, the banned newspaper was revived by the mighty will of K. Kumar of Travancore, the veteran Gandhian and Freedom Fighter. He viewed the revival as a befitting tribute to Ramakrishna Pillai. Kumar himself was its manager and chief-editor. He was assisted in his efforts by K. Narayana Kurukkal, a close colleague of Ramakrishna Pillai and the author of the novels: "Parappuram" and "Udayabhanu" besides Barrister A K Pillai. Ramakrishna Pillai's wife, B. Kalyani Amma, Pillai's associates K. Narayana Kurukkal, R. Narayana Panikker and the famous political-journalist Raman Menon and K. Kumar himself were regular contributors to the magazine. The paper was revived under the same name 'Swadeshabhimani' and had its headquarters in the building currently housing the DPI Office at Thycaud, Thiruvananthapuram. In spite of all these, the government wisely chose to remain silent. The new 'Swadeshabhimani' was re-modeled after "Modern Review" of Ramand Chatterjee. It continued its legacy as a significant force transforming the socio-political life of Kerala. K. Kumar had great admiration for Ramakrishna Pillai and he took the lead role in organizing the deportation-day of Pillai as "Ramakrishna Pillai Day" (from M.E: 10-02-1098) and erecting his statue in Trivandrum. Ramakrishna Pillai Day continued to be commemorated in Trivandrum for a long time thereafter. It appears that the editorship of Swadeshabhimani passed on to A.K Pillai (by 1932) who also edited the "Swarat" with the help and support of K. Kumar.

NOTE: After Independence, the Government of Kerala returned the press of Swadeshabhimani to Vakkom Moulavi's family in 1957.

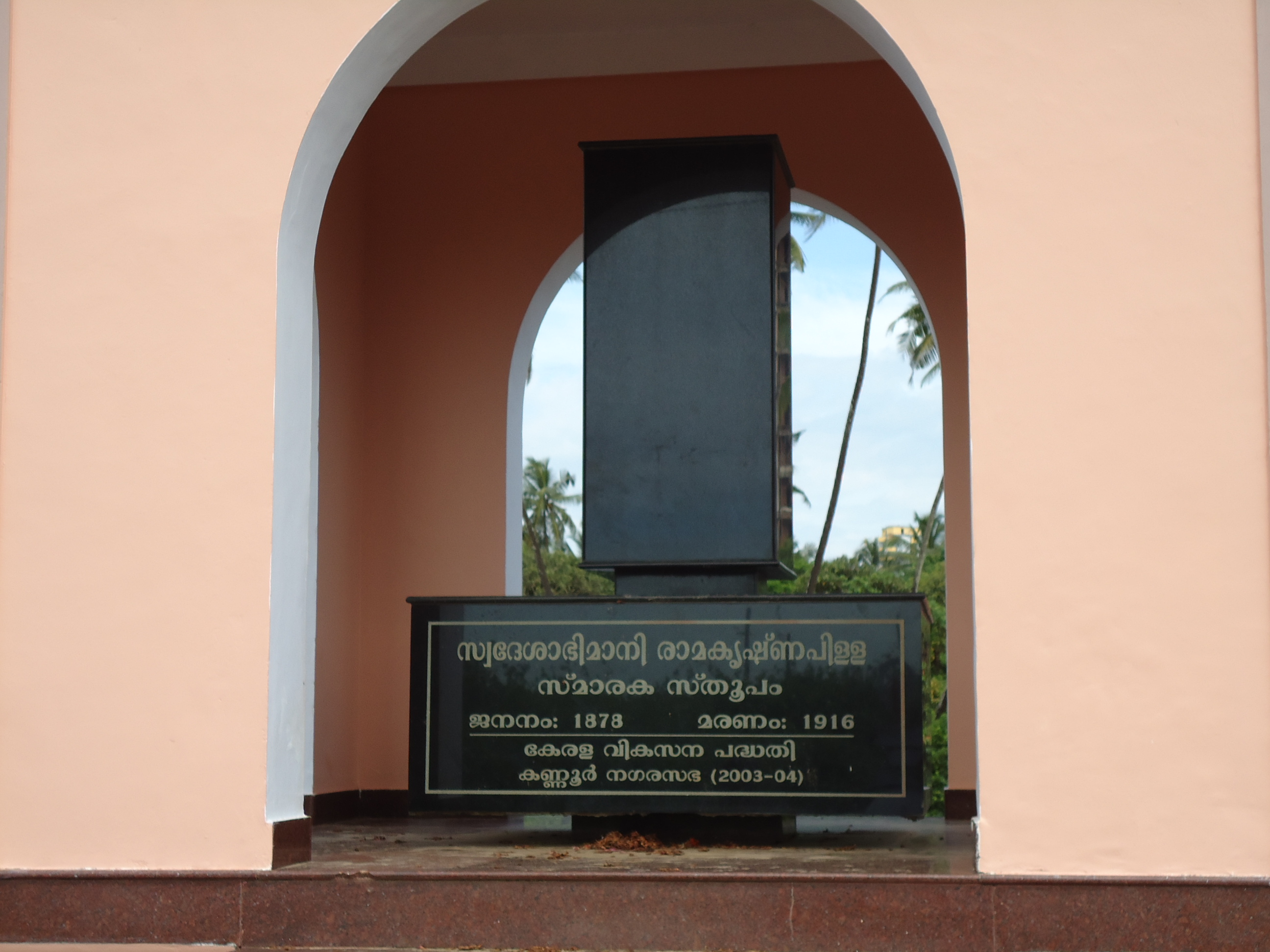
Ramakrishna Pillai Samadhi at Kannur

== Last years ==
While in exile, Ramakrishna Pillai returned to his studies. He joined the F.L. Degree and Kalyaniamma joined BA Degree program in Philosophy. It was during these days in Madras that he wrote the book Ende Naadukadathal (ISBN 81-264-1222-4 ) on his banishment from Travancore. After a brief vacation in Palghat, the family returned to Madras. Pillai had to attend to studies as well as court proceedings in the Indian Patriot Case. In April, the couple left Madras. Their third child, a daughter, was born following this on 7 August 1912.

In the same year, Ramakrishna Pillai published Vrithantha Pathra Pravarthanam, a book on Journalism which became very popular later. His biographies of Karl Marx and Benjamin Franklin were also published. There are scores of articles and literary creations to his credit. In May 1913, the family went to Palghat after which Ramakrishna Pillai published his books Mannante Kannathum and Narakathil Ninnu. When Kaliyaniamma found a job as a teacher in Kannur, they moved Kannur. His physical health began to deteriorate during this period.

Ramakrishna Pillai succumbed to his ill-health on 28 March 1916.

== Literary works ==
Ramakrishna Pillai wrote over 20 books in his lifetime and many of them are very notable.

- Vruththaanthapathrapravarthanam (Malayalam) (1912)
- Ende Naadukadathal (My Banishment) (ISBN 81-264-1222-4)
- Karl Marx (Malayalam): His biography of Karl Marx was the first in any Indian language.
- Mohandas Karamchand Gandhi, (Malayalam) – Biography
- Benjamin Franklin (Malayalam) – Biography
- Socrates (Malayalam) – Biography
- Pathradharmam (Essays)
- Mannante Kannathu
- Christopher Columbus (Translation in Malayalam)
- Narakathil Ninnu (From Hell)
- Kerala Bhasholpathy (The origin of language in Kerala)
- Delhi Durbar
- The Deportation Case of Travancore

Dramas: Prathima, Kamandalu (Ekanka Natakam), Thookumuriyil, Thapthabashoam

Stories: Aa Deenarodhanam

== B. Kalyani Amma ==
B. Kalyani Amma was the second wife of Ramakrishna Pillai. She was born on 11 Kumbhom 1059 (ME) (1883 AD). She was a notable litterateur also Her important works includes Vyazhavatta Smaranakal, Karmaphalam, Mahathikal and Atmakatha. Her biography Vyazhavatta Smaranakal ( Memories of 12 years) is about the 12 years of their married life. She also translated a novel written by Rabindranath Tagore. She died on 9 October 1959 (28 Kanni 1135).

== Swadeshabhimani Smaraka Samithi ==
Swadesha abhimani Smaraka Samidhi is the trust formed in the memory of Ramakrishna Pillai. The Samidhi observes anniversaries of the banishment of Swadeshabhimani Ramakrishna Pillai every year, which is attended by several eminent personalities.

== Swadeshabhimani Ramakrishna Pillai Award ==
The Swadeshabhimani Ramakrishna Pillai Award is awarded for press journalism every year by the Government of Kerala. The following are its recipients.

- 2002: V. K. Madhvankutty (Awarded by the President of India)
- 2006: G. Sekharan Nair (Mathrubhumi) and Reji Joseph (Deepika)
- 2013: B. R. P. Bhaskaran
- 2014: V. P. Ramachandran
- 2016: K. Mohanan
- 2017: TJS George

The Pravasi Swadeshabhimani Ramakrishna Pillai Award has been instituted in memory of Ramakrishna Pillai, by the Pravasi Malayali Society.

== Swadeshabhimani memorial ==
Memorial at Payyambalam beach

Memorials of Swadeshabhimani Ramakrishna Pillai are constructed at Neyyattinkara and at Payyambalam Beach, Kannur.

== See also ==
Social reformers in Kerala

- Sree Narayana Guru
- Dr. Palpu
- Kumaranasan
- Rao Sahib Dr. Ayyathan Gopalan
- Brahmananda Swami Sivayogi
- Vaghbhatananda
- Mithavaadi Krishnan
- Moorkoth Kumaran
- Ayyankali
- Ayya Vaikundar
- Pandit Karuppan
