= Krishna Prasad =

Krishna Prasad may refer to:

- Krishna Prasad (actor), Indian actor
- Krishna Prasad (journalist) (born 1968), Indian journalist
- Krishna Prasad (politician) (died 2010), Fijian politician
- Krishna Prasad, Indian politician; see 1990 Bihar Legislative Assembly election
