= Dr. B. R. Ambedkar College of Law =

College in Andhra Pradesh, India

Coordinates: 17.725°N 83.327°E

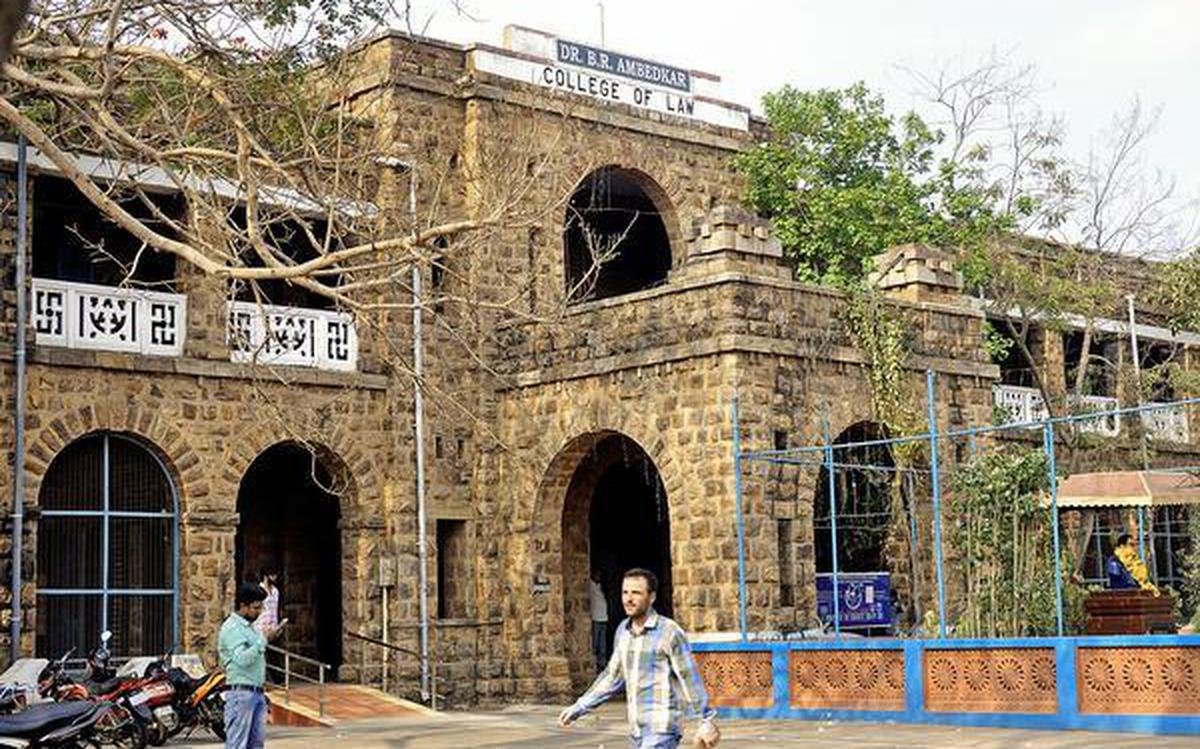
- Motto: Dharmo Rakshati Rakshitaha
- Type: Public
- Established: 1945; 81 years ago
- Affiliations: Andhra University
- Principal: V. Vijay Lakshmi
- Location: Visakhapatnam, Andhra Pradesh, India
- Campus: South Campus, Andhra University
- Website: Official website

Dr. B. R. Ambedkar College of Law (formerly known as Andhra University College of Law) is one of the constituent colleges of Andhra University established in 1945. This college is recognised as an advanced center in Law by University Grants Commission. Former Vice-President of India M. Venkaiah Naidu, Supreme Court Justice Jasti Chalameswar Rao are among its notable alumni.

== History ==
The college was established on 4 July 1945. Initially it started functioning in a private building at Machilipatnam, due to exigencies of Second World War. The College was shifted to University campus in the year 1949. It owes its genesis to Dr. C. R. Reddy, its founding vice-chancellor.

The college was part of the Department of Arts, Commerce and Law College from the beginning, but was reconstructed as a separate college of law on 14 April 1989. The college was renamed as Dr. B. R. Ambedkar College of Law to honour Bhimrao Ramji Ambedkar on 10 May 1991.

== Principals ==
- Prof. K.Gupteswar (14-04-1989 to 30-04-1990)
- Prof. R.Jaganmohan Rao (01-05-1990 to 30-04-1993)
- Prof. A.Lakshminath (01-05-1993 to 30-04-1996)
- Prof. Dr.M.V.A. Naidu (01-05-1996 to 30-04-1999)
- Prof. C.Rama Rao (01-05-1999 to 14-05-2002)
- Prof. D.S.N.Somayajulu (15-05-2002 to 29-02-2004)
- Prof. R.Venkata Rao (01-03-2004 to 28-02-2007)
- Prof. Y.Satyanarayana (01-03-2007 to 17-09-2008)
- Prof. A. Rajendra Prasad (18-09-2008 to present)

== Academics ==
- LL.B. (Three years)
- LL.M. (Two Years)
- B.A., LL.B. (Five years)
- Ph.D. (Full-Time - Two years)
- Ph.D. (Part-Time - Three years)

== Luminaries ==
- K. V. Gopalaswamy, M.A., (Oxon) Bar-at-Law, was "Interim Professor-in-charge".
- Prof. S. Venkataraman,
- Prof. G. C. V. Subba Rao,
- Prof. V. Balasubrahmaniam,
- Prof. D. Gopalakrishna Sastry,
- Prof A. S. Ramachandra Rao,
- Prof. V. Lakshmana Rao
- Prof. B. S. Murty,
- Prof. K. Gupteswar
- Justice K. Rama Swamy, former Judge, Supreme Court of India,
- Justice Amareswari Konamaneni, Judge (Retd.) A.P. High Court,
- Justice Immaneni Panduranga Rao, Judge, A.P. High Court,
- Justice N. D. Patnaik, Judge, A.P. High Court,
- Justice P. Ramakrishna Raju, Judge, A.P. High Court,
- Shri P. S. Rao, Member, International Law Commission,
- Shri R. Rangaiah, Member, Income Tax Tribunal,
- Dr. M. Gopalakrishna Reddy, former Vice-Chancellor, Andhra University,
- Prof. Y. C. Simhadri, Vice-Chancellor, Banaras Hindu University,
- Sri B. Krishna Mohan, former Member UPSC and
- Sri G. V. G. Krishna Murthy, former Election Commissioner,
- Sri D. V. Subba Rao, Chairman Bar Council of India
- Shri Yerrannaidu Kinjarapu, former Union Minister,
- Sri. G. M. C. Balayogi, former Hon'ble Speaker, Lok Sabha,
- Sri M. Venkaiah Naidu, Hon'ble vice - president of India, former Union Minister for Rural Development and former president, Bharatiya Janata Party,
- Prof Dr. R. Venkata Rao, Vice-Chancellor, National Law School of India University, Bangalore.
- G. Rohini, Chief justice of Delhi High Court.
- Justice S. Ravikumar, judge, A.P high court
