= Vadlamani =

Vadlamani is a Telugu surname. Notable people with the surname include:

- Priya Vadlamani (born 1997), Indian actress
- Ravi Vadlamani (born 1956), Indian accountant
