= P. Habeeb Mohamed =

Indian politician

Justice P. Habeeb Mohamed
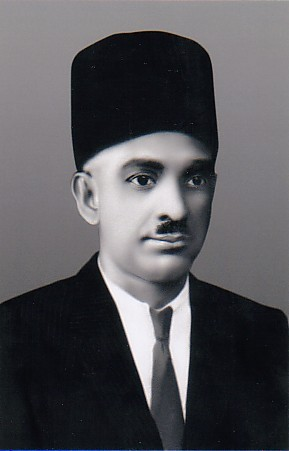
- Justice Habeeb in the 1950s

Judge, The High Court of Travancore
- In office 1946–1949

Judge, The High Court of Travancore-Cochin
- In office 1949–1951

Personal details
- Born: 2 June 1899 Travancore Princely State, Madras Presidency, British India
- Died: 15 March 1963 (aged 63) Thiruvananthapuram, Kerala, India

P. Habeeb Mohamed (1899–1963) was an Indian lawyer and the first Muslim judge of the High Court of Travancore.

== Early life and family ==
Habeeb was born in 1899, in Vakkom, into an affluent and prominent Poonthran Muslim family. He was the nephew of Vakkom Moulavi, a visionary, social reformer and the founder of Swadeshabhimani newspaper. Habeeb was the first of three children born to Pakeer Mytheen and Mohamed Pathumma. His brother, Mohamed Mytheen was an Islamic scholar and writer. He had one sister: Mariyam Beevi. Habeeb had his early education in Attingal High School, Trivandrum H.H.Maharaja's College, Trivandrum (the present University College), and Law College, Trivandrum. He was married to Haleema Beevi, niece of Vakkom Moulavi. They had two daughters. The elder daughter, the late Subaida, was married to Mohamed Ghani, the son of Mohammed Mustafa Sahib, former MLC of Madras. The younger daughter Naseema, was married to the late K. Seethi Mohammed, the only son of the late K.M. Seethi Sahib.

== Career ==
Habeeb was a contemporary of the late K.M. Seethi Sabib (at Law College), who became the Speaker of the Kerala State Legislative Assembly. He enrolled as an advocate in Trivandrum first. He also worked as a Municif in Trivandrum for six months, before he became the district judge of Trivandrum. Justice Habeeb served as district judge in Kottayam, Kollam, Alappuzha, and Trivandrum. He became judge of the High Court in 1946 and moved his career to Ernakulam. He retired as the judge of the High Court in 1951.

== Notable Contribution ==
Justice Habeeb's notable contribution while in service was his famous judgment on the Absabeevi's case while serving as District Judge of Alleppy. His verdict that Muslim woman had the right to get divorced from her husband was remarkable at a time when the Islamic Sharia was still a matter of controversy in respect of its alleged bias against women.

== Later years and death ==
After retiring from his judicial career in 1951, he became active in the Muslim League for some time. He died in 1963.

== See also ==
- Vakkom Moulavi
- Vakkom Majeed
