= Andhra University College of Pharmaceutical Sciences =

Coordinates: 17.725°N 83.327°E

- Type: College
- Established: 1951
- Principal: Prof.N Rajendra prasad
- Location: Visakhapatnam, Andhra Pradesh, India
- Website: http://www.andhrauniversity.info/pharmacy/

Andhra University College of Pharmaceutical Sciences is a constituent college of Andhra University, established in 1951.

== History ==
The College of Pharmaceutical Sciences was formed as a separate department in 1951, with the commencement of a B.Pharm. course, with the late Prof. S. Rangaswamy as founder Head of the Department. The M.Pharm. course was started in 1954. A separate Faculty of Pharmaceutical Sciences was formed in 1975.

Andhra University is the second institute in the country to start pharmacy courses at university level in the 1930s. The pharmacy courses were offered in the B.Sc. Honours degree of Chemical Technology and as a specialization at M.Sc. Chemical Technology level. The M.Pharm. course was started in 1954. A separate Faculty of Pharmaceutical Sciences was formed in 1975.

The department offers B.Pharm. and postgraduate M.Pharm. and Ph.D. programmes in Pharmaceutical Technology, Pharmaceutical Biotechnology, Pharmaceutical Chemistry, Pharmaceutical and Food Analysis, Pharmacology and Pharmacognosy and Phytochemistry. The department was the first in the country to start pharmaceutical biotechnology division. With Prof. S. Rangaswamy, founder faculty members were Prof. V. Subba Rao, Prof. N. Viswanadham, Prof. K. Sambamurty and Prof. E. Venkata Rao.

Teachers and researchers who served as Heads of Department in the past include late Prof. S. Rangaswamy (1951–1963), late Prof. V. Subba Rao (1963–1979), Prof. N. Viswanadham (1979–1982), late Prof. K. Sambamurty (1982–1985), Prof. E. Venkata Rao (1985–1988), Prof. D. Visweswaram (1988–1991), Prof. R.V. Krishna Rao (1991–1992), Prof. M. Vimala Devi (1993–1995), Prof. D. Venkata Rao (1996–1998), Prof. P. Ellaiah (1999–2001) and Prof. K.P.R Chowdary (2002-2005).

== Ranking ==
University rankings

Pharmacy – India
- NIRF (2023): 22

Andhra University College of Pharmaceutical Sciences was ranked 22 in India by the National Institutional Ranking Framework (NIRF) pharmacy ranking in 2023.
