= Baroda dynamite case =

1976 imprisonment of Indian opposition leaders during the Emergency

The arrest of socialist labour leader, George Fernandes in 1976, one of the key accused in the Baroda dynamite case.

The Baroda dynamite case is the term used for the criminal case launched by the Indian government under Indira Gandhi during the Emergency against the opposition leader George Fernandes and 24 others.

== Charges and arrest ==
The Central Bureau of Investigation (CBI) charged George and others of smuggling dynamite to blow up government establishments and railway tracks in protest against the state of emergency. They were also charged with waging war against the state to overthrow the government. The accused were arrested in June 1976 and imprisoned in Tihar Jail, Delhi.

The other prominent accused included Viren J. Shah, G.G. Parikh, C.G.K. Reddy, Prabhudas Patwari, Devi Gujjar and Motilal Kanojia. The case was tried in Delhi, as the CBI argued that even though the site of the incident was Baroda, the case had national ramifications.

Fernandes fought the 1977 Lok Sabha election from Muzaffarpur in Bihar while in jail under trial in the case. He swept the polls, with his supporters campaigning with his photo in prison cell and chains.

== Release and aftermath ==
Janata Party withdrew the case on coming to power in 1977 and all accused were released.

Snehalata Reddy was an Indian actress. She and her husband, Pattabhi Rama Reddy, participated in the anti-Emergency movement. Snehalata was a close friend of George Fernandes and was arrested on 2 May 1976 for being a part of the Baroda dynamite case; however, while George Fernandes and many others were made accused in the case, Snehalata's name was not on the final charge-sheet. Even so, she was kept as a prisoner, where she was regularly tortured and was confined to live in inhuman conditions at Bangalore Central Prison. When later her health deteriorated, she was released on parole on 15 January 1977. She died five days later due to chronic asthma and lung infection on 20 January 1977, being one of the first martyrs of the Emergency.
