= Vakkom Majeed =

Indian politician (1909–2000)

S. Abdul Majeed
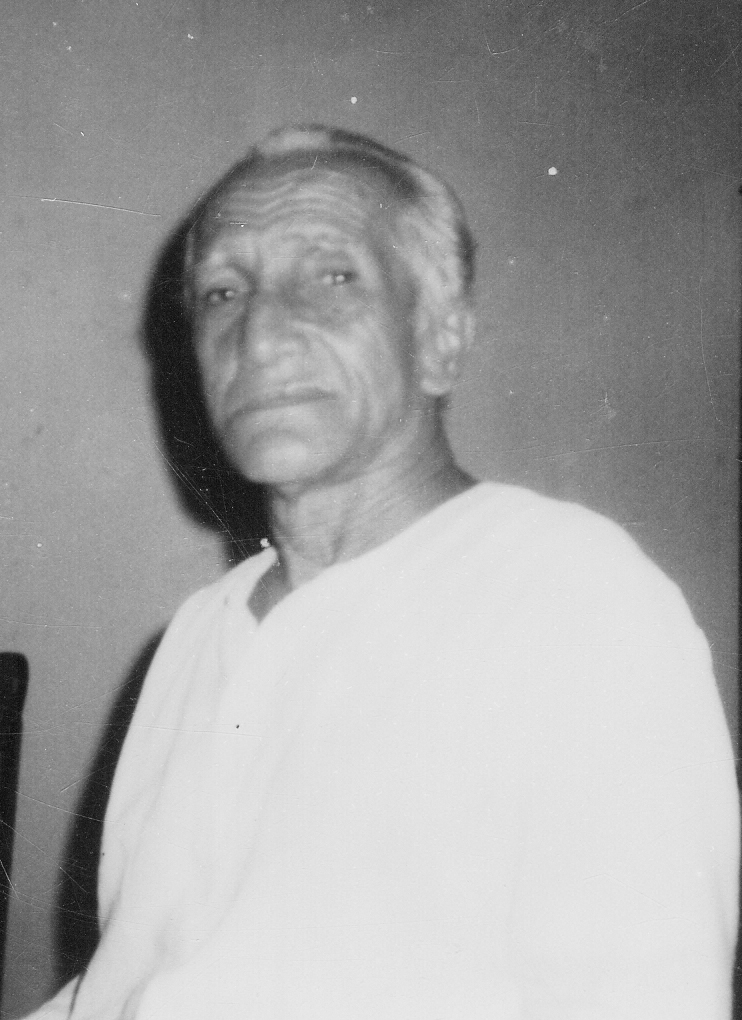
- Vakkom Majeed in the 1980s
- Born: 20 December 1909; Travancore Princely State, Madras Presidency, British India
- Died: 10 July 2000 (aged 90); Vakkom, Thiruvananthapuram, Kerala, India
- Other name: Vakkom Majeed
- Political party: Indian National Congress
- Spouse: Sulekha Beevi (Late)
- Children: 3
- Parent(s): Mohamed Beevi (Mother); Syed Mohamed(Father)

Vakkom Majeed (born S. Abdul Majeed; 20 December 1909 – 10 July 2000) was an Indian freedom fighter, politician and a former member of the Travancore-Cochin State Assembly. He was born into one of the most prominent aristocratic Muslim families in Travancore. Influenced by the works of his uncle, Vakkom Moulavi, he became involved in social and political reform movements. Majeed was one of the early architects of the Indian National Congress in Travancore, eventually becoming the Member of the Legislative Assembly for Attingal constituency (1948–1952). Regarded as one of the great Indian nationalists of 20th century, Majeed belonged to a tradition of politics that was intrinsically value-based, secular and humanistic.

== Early life and family ==
Majeed was born on 20 December 1909, in Vakkom, into a prominent and influential Muslim family Poonthran which had ancestral roots to Madurai and Hyderabad. His maternal great-grandfather, Thoppil Thampi and maternal grandfather, Mohamed Kunju were radical for their times. His uncle, Vakkom Moulavi, was a visionary, social reformer, scholar, educationist, writer, journalist and the founder of Swadeshabhimani newspaper. Majeed was the first of four children born to Syed Mohamed and Mohamed Beevi. He had one sister: Safiya Beevi (1912–1986) and two brothers: Mohamed Abda (1914–1992), and Abdul Latheef (1917–1999). Majeed obtained his early education at St. Joseph High School, Anjengo. In 1936, Majeed married Suleha Beevi, the niece of Vakkom Moulavi. They had five children: Fathima (born 1937), infant boy (1939–1940), Najma (1943–1957), infant girl (1953-died soon after birth) and Shameema (1957–2011).

== Freedom struggle ==
He was attracted to the social reform movement of his uncle, Vakkom Moulavi, as well as Narayana Guru. He came to politics in his early school days. When the Indian National Movement emerged in Kerala, Majeed was in the forefront of its leadership. He was one of the early architects of the Indian National Congress in Travancore. As a young man, he also became greatly involved in the social reform movement. Majeed was one of the few Congress leaders in Travancore who exhibited enormous courage by participating in the Quit India movement in 1942 and got arrested. He remained in jail for several months. Subsequently, when the idea of "independent Travancore" was mooted, Majeed was a staunch opponent of it and took part in the agitation against the move. He was incarcerated again for several months. When the INA hero Vakkom Kadir was sentenced to death by the British, Majeed visited him in the Madras Central jail. It was Majeed who brought Kadir's last letter to his father before the hanging.

== Political career ==
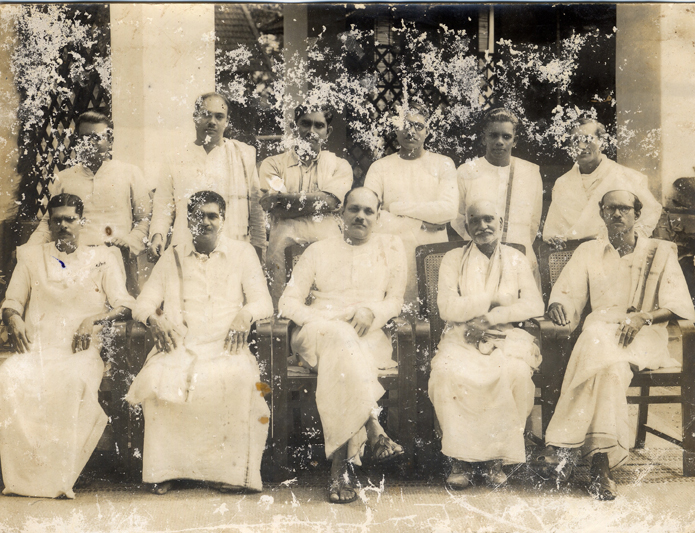
Vakkom Majeed (standing right) with other members of Travancore-Cochin (Thiru-Kochi) state assembly in 1950s

Majeed was a politician-extraordinary in the socio-political realm of Kerala in the 20th century. A staunch opponent of the Two-Nation Theory and Pakistan movement, Majeed argued that only a secular-nationalist India could keep the heart and soul of the masses together. In 1948, he was elected (unopposed) to the Travancore-Cochin State Assembly from the Attingal constituency. When the tenure of his term came to an end in 1952, he decided to eschew practical politics and took to serious reading. He was attracted to the writings of Bertrand Russell, M.N. Roy and several French writers. Majeed was opposed to doctrinaire politics and argued for secular-humanist perspective in politics and social issues. Majeed upheld the values of Liberalism and Modernism in Islam and called for the return of Ijtihad (freedom of thought) in Islamic traditions. He equally valued the thoughts of Narayana Guru and pointed to the increasing relevance of a "casteless" society.

== Later years and death ==
The last three decades of Vakkom Majeed was the decades of his intense exploration and reading (and rereading) of nationalist history, ideology and practice. In 1972, during the Silver Jubilee celebration of Indian Independence, the nation honoured him by giving 'Tamrapatra' for his participation in the Indian independence movement. He received the 'Tamrapatra' from the then Prime Minister, Indira Gandhi. By the end of the 1980s, Majeed's health was failing, and he was soon bedridden for a year. His wife Suleha Beevi died on 18 June 1993. Although he managed to attend few socio-political functions in the later 1990s, his health was suffering. On 8 July 2000, he fell seriously ill and admitted in a private clinic. His condition worsened soon afterward and shifted to the CCU (Critical Care Unit) of Cosmopolitan Hospital, Thiruvananthapuram. On 10 July 2000 he suffered a fatal heart attack and was pronounced dead at 6:30 local time (1:00 UTC). Majeed was buried in East Jamaat Masjid (Vakkom Padinjare Jamaat Mosque) in Vakkom, alongside his ancestors.

== Ancestors ==
Ancestors of Vakkom Majeed

8. Aliyar Kunju Sr.
4. Aliyar Kunju Poonthran Vilakom
9. Wife of Aliyar Kunju Sr.
2. Syed Mohamed Kayalpuram
10. Son in Law of Thoppil Thampi
5. Pathumma Kayalpuram
11. Daughter of Thoppil Thampi
1. Vakkom Majeed
12. Colachel Thoppil Thampi
6. Mohamed Kunju Kayalpuram
13. Aamina Umma Kayalpuram
3. Mohamed Beevi Kochumanakkadu
14. Pathe Khan Hyderabad
7. Aash Beevi Mulluvilakom
15. Daughter of Kacheekaran Saitte Anjengo

== See also ==
- Vakkom Moulavi
- Justice Habeeb Mohamed
