= Krishna Prasad (journalist) =

Journalist

- Born: 12 October 1968 (age 57); Mysore
- Occupation: Journalist
- Employer: Outlook

Krishna Prasad (born 12 October 1968) is an Indian journalist. He is currently the Group Editorial Officer in The Hindu Group Publications Private Limited since April 2021. In this designation, he plays a guiding role on content management across all the publications, working with the editors and the business and technical teams to drive THG’s digital transformation.

Previously, he has served as Editor-in-Chief of the news magazine Outlook between 2012 and 2016. He also publishes three different blogs: Churumuri, Sans Serif and Kosambari. He is known for having exposed match-fixing in Indian Cricket along with Aniruddha Bahal.

== Early life ==
Krishna Prasad was born in Mysore into a Telugu-speaking south Indian family. He attended the Central Food Technological Research Institute (CFTRI) school. He then enrolled in an engineering college to study electronics engineering, but dropped out without completing the program.

== Career ==
While he was still a student of engineering, Krishna Prasad began his media career as a stringer for the New Indian Express, under the editorship of T. J. S. George. He later worked for the Sunday Observer (now defunct) and the Times of India in Mumbai. From August 2006 to June 2007, Krishna Prasad edited the English-language daily Vijay Times (a sister publication of Times of India, which was later converted into Bangalore Mirror). He then joined Outlook as a reporter and later became the magazine's special issues editor.

In March 2006, a few months before joining Vijay Times, Krishna Prasad started publishing the Churumuri blog, after drawing inspiration from a speech delivered in colloquial Kannada by Captain G. R. Gopinath. He later started the media blog Sans Serif, a media blog, and Kosambari, a blog focused on south Indian Vegetarian cuisine.

In October 2008, Krishna Prasad was appointed editor of Outlook, the progressive, current affairs magazine published from New Delhi. He was appointed editor-in-chief of the magazine with effect from 1 February 2012. He was replaced by Rajesh Ramachandran with effect from 16 August 2016. His removal has been attributed to the publication, in the 29 July issue of the magazine, of a story alleging the trafficking of 31 underage Assamese girls by organizations associated with the RSS. The story had resulted in a criminal case being filed against the magazine for defamation.

He is currently the Group Editorial Officer by The Hindu Group Publishing Private Limited effective from 16 April 2021. A position first of its kind in Indian media, he is tasked with leading and enabling greater synergies across different print publications and digital offerings, by coordinating content efforts across all publications of The Hindu Group.

== Other interests and activities ==
Krishna Prasad has lectured on journalism at various colleges and universities in India and abroad. From August to October 2007, he traveled in the United States, lecturing on the topic of "Indian media" at Central Michigan University, Ball State University, University of Wisconsin-River Falls, and Penn State University. He has also lectured at the Indian Institute of Management, Bangalore; the National Defence College, New Delhi; Asian College of Journalism, Chennai and the Lal Bahadur Shastri National Academy of Administration, Mussorie.

Krishna Prasad recently instituted the T S Satyan Memorial Awards for Photojournalism in association with Karnataka Photo News, a regional photo news agency.

Thomas L. Friedman described Prasad as "one of the brightest young journalists I met in India" during a 2004 visit from the United States.

== Bibliography ==
- Prasad, Krishna (12 January 2015). "New Year diary". Last Page. Outlook. 55 (1): 178.
