= Budhakhol =

- Town
- Budhakhol
- Location of Buguda in Odisha Budhakhol (India)
- Coordinates: 19.820230°N 84.823503°E
- Country: India
- State: Odisha
- District: Ganjam
- Time zone: UTC+05:30 (IST)
- Official language: Odia
- Spoken languages: Odia

Budhakhol is a heritage site of Odisha located in Buguda block of Ganjam District in Odisha, India. It is located about 92 km away from the district headquarters. The town is known for its five temples: Sri Sri Makareswar Swami, Sri Sri Gangadhareswar Swami, Sri Sri Jagadieshwar Swami, Sri Sri Siddheswar Swami, and Sri Sri Budheswar Swami, which is popularly known as Panchu Mahadeva Temple.

== History ==
Budhakhol is derived from Badhesvara, which means Buddha in meditating position. It is strongly believed that Buddha visited the place. Huentsang also visited the place and witnessed the learning and teaching of Buddhists and believed that it was one of the best places to learn Buddhism. The Panchumahadeva temples are believed to be built in the era of Jagadguru Adi Shankaracharya. Hence the place is a mix of both Buddhism and Hinduism.

== Tourism ==
Budhakhol is widely known for its Buddhist culture. A number of Buddhist remains are found at the place which gives the impression about Buddhist settlement at the place. The main attraction point of this place is the combination of caves, jungles and water falls, along with it the combination of bunch of five temples makes the place a must visit for pilgrims too.

Forty Two Feet Long Statues of Lord Shiva and Parvati donated by Indian Princess and Bollywood Actress Ipsita Pati at Budhakhol, Buguda, Odisha.
