= Ipsita Pati =

Actress

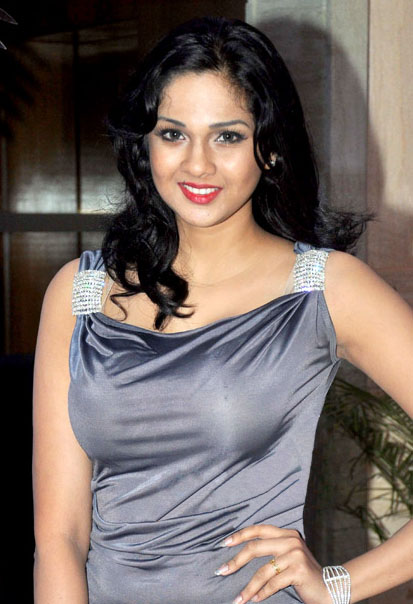
- Pati at Fashion Theatrical fashion show
- Born: 18 of June of 1991 (34 years old); Vishakhapatnam, Andhra Pradesh, India
- Education: Andhra University (Master in Public Administration); Delhi Public School Society
- Occupations: Model, Actress, Philanthropist
- Height: 5 ft 9 in (175 cm)
- Political party: Bharatiya Janata Party
- Parent(s): Byomakesh Pati (father); Pooja Pati (mother).
- Beauty pageant titleholder
- Title: Indian Princess 2011
- Years active: 2008–present
- Major competitions: Miss Universe India 2010 (Unplaced); Indian Princess 2011 (Winner); Miss Intercontinental 2011 (Top 15); Femina Miss India 2012 (Top 5)
- Website: ipsitapati.com

Ipsita Pati is an Indian actress and beauty pageant titleholder who represented her country at Miss Intercontinental 2011 where she placed Top 15. She has won multiple beauty pageant contests including that of Miss Asia and Miss International. Pati has also acted in Hindi film, Chor Bazaari (2014). Forty Two Feet Long Statues of Lord Shiva and Parvati donated by Ipsita Pati at Budhakhol, Buguda, Odisha.

== Early life and education ==
Ipsita Pati was born and raised in the Steel Family of Visakhapatnam. Her father Mr. Byomakesh Pati is an AGM, painter and her mother Mrs. Pooja Pati was an actress and model who appeared in Odiya films and also participated in Gladrags Mrs India 2006 contest. She has a younger sister Ms. Anwesha Pati who is a performer. She has a bachelor's degree and is currently pursuing her Masters of Public Administration from Andhra University.

== Career ==
At 16, Pati walked on the ramp for the first time. In 2008, she won the Miss South India title. In 2010, she made it to the final of Miss Universe India. She participated in the 2010 I AM She – Miss Universe India contest and was shortlisted among the top-30 final contestants but later dropped out from the list. Pati alleged that she was "intentionally removed" from the list, and accused organizers for being of the "partisan attitude" and causing her "mental and physical torture". She filed a complaint at Women's police station in Bhubaneswar and at National Human Rights Commission.

In 2011, she was crowned Indian Princess title in Thailand and the Miss Intercontinental India in Spain, and in 2012, won the Femina Miss India's Peoples Choice award. She is also winner of the Miss International and the Miss Asia (2013) titles.

Ipsita Pati made her Bollywood debut in 2015 with the film Chor Bazaari in which she was cast in the female lead. Pati is a recipient of Andhra Ratna and Youth Icon awards from the state government of Andhra Pradesh and Odisha respectively.

== Filmography ==
Year	Film	Role	Language	Notes
2015	Chor Bazaari		Hindi film	

== Awards and accolades ==
Ipsita has won several awards in her film career.

- Miss South India 2008.
- First Indian Princess 2011(Thailand).
- Miss International Golden Skin 2011(Mexico).
- Miss Internet and Miss Elegance Mexico.
- Miss India Intercontinental '11(Spain).
- Femina People's Choice Miss Indiatimes 2012.
- Miss ASIA 2013.
- Andhra Ratna andhra pradesh Government.
- Ugadi Purashkar, Visakhapatnam.
- Gold Medalist in Dance.
