= B. L. K. Somayajulu =

Indian geochemist (1937–2016)

- Born: 5 March 1937; Visakhapatnam, Andhra Pradesh, India
- Died: 19 December 2016 (aged 79); Ahmedabad, Gujarat, India
- Education: Andhra University; Bombay University; Scripps Institution of Oceanography
- Known for: Studies on marine processes
- Awards: 1978 Shanti Swarup Bhatnagar Prize; 1981 Hari Om Ashram Prerit Award; 2006 MoES National Award for Ocean Science and Technology
- Scientific career
- Fields: Geochemistry; Geochronology; Oceanography
- Workplaces: BARC Training School; Tata Institute of Fundamental Research; Physical Research Laboratory

Bhamidipati Lakshmidhara Kanakadri Somayajulu (5 March 1937 – 19 December 2016) was an Indian geochemist and a CSIR Emeritus Scientist at Physical Research Laboratory, Ahmedabad. He is known for his studies on ancient and contemporary marine processes and is an elected fellow of several science societies such as the National Academy of Sciences, India, Geological Society of India, Indian Geophysical Union, American Geophysical Union, European Association for Geochemistry, Indian Academy of Sciences and the Indian National Science Academy. The Council of Scientific and Industrial Research, the apex agency of the Government of India for scientific research, awarded him the Shanti Swarup Bhatnagar Prize for Science and Technology, one of the highest Indian science awards for his contributions to Earth, Atmosphere, Ocean and Planetary Sciences in 1978.

== Biography ==
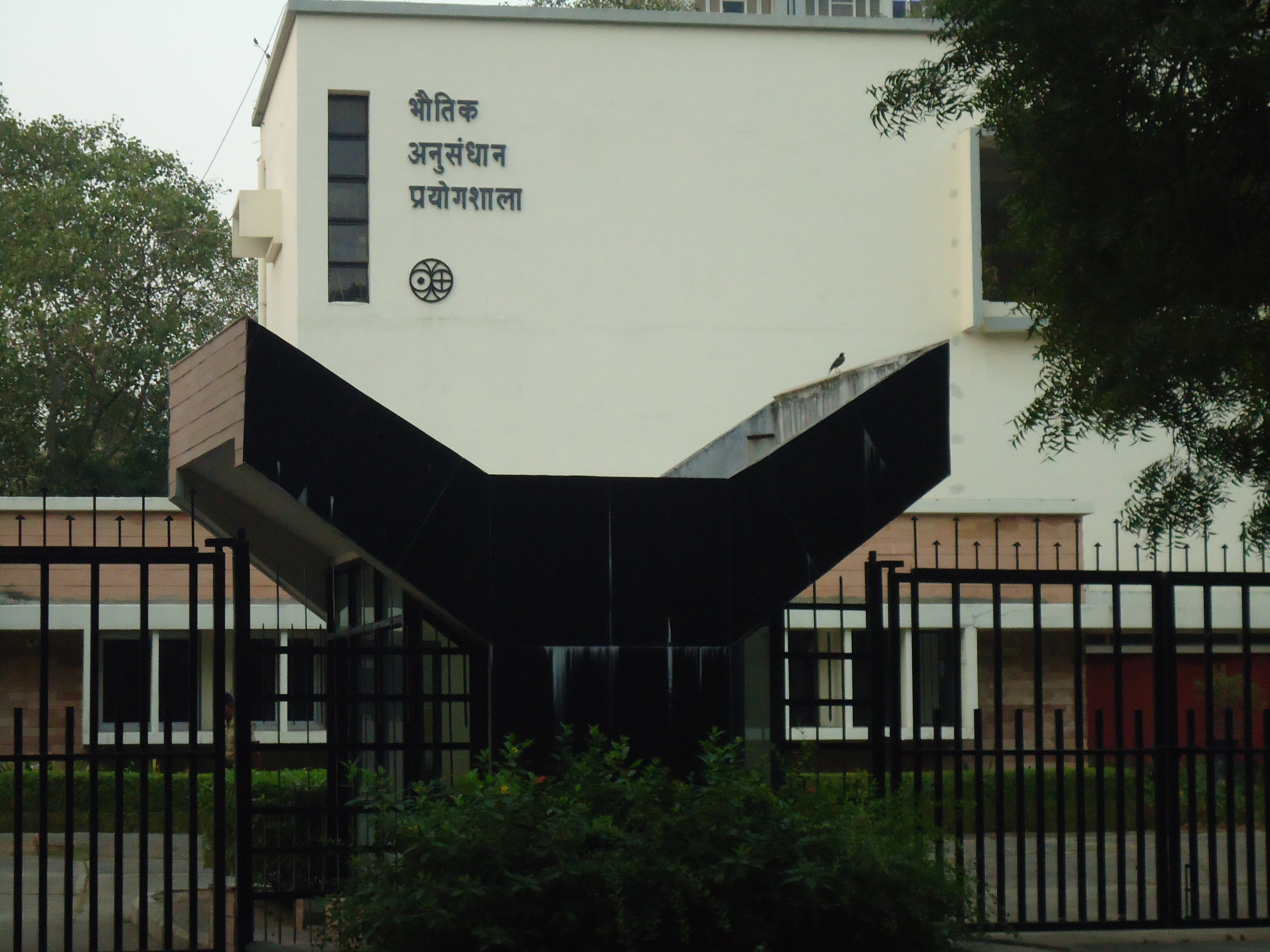
Physical Research Laboratory

B. L. K. Somayajulu, born on 5 March 1937 in the port city of Visakhapatanam in the south Indian state of Andhra Pradesh, completed his graduate studies (BSc hons) from Andhra University in 1956. Subsequently, he joined BARC Training School, simultaneously enrolling at Bombay University for pursuing his doctoral studies. During the course of his PhD studies, he moved to Tata Institute of Fundamental Research (TIFR) and had a three-year stint at Scripps Institution of Oceanography before securing a PhD in 1969 from Bombay University. His post-doctoral work was also at Scripps Institution and on his return to India, he joined Oceanography and Climate Studies Area, Earth Sciences and Solar System Division of Physical Research Laboratory (PRL) in 1972. He served the institution for the whole of his career till his superannuation in 1997 and post-retirement, he continues his association with PRL as an honorary professor and a CSIR Emeritus Scientist.

== Legacy ==
Somayajulu is known to have done extensive researches on the physico-chemical reactions within the oceans and the water-sediment interface and has developed many research methodologies which include the nuclear methods for the determination of the growth rates of manganese nodules, advection-diffusion mixing of ocean waters, cosmic ray-produced 32Si and 10Be in studies for determining the calculation of sediment accumulation rates and geochemical methods for studying reactive elements in sea water. He conducted beryllium-10 studies on manganese nodules which helped establish the slow rate of growth of the nodules. His researches have been documented as chapter in a book, The Indian Human Heritage, and as several peer-reviewed articles, (Note: Please see Selected bibliography section) the article repository of the Indian Academy of Sciences has listed 100 of them. He has also edited a book, From Mantle to Meteorites: A Garland of Perspectives - A Festschrift for Devendra Lal, published by Indian Academy of Sciences in 1990 and his work has been cited by several authors.

Somayajulu served as the chief scientist for many studies conducted in the Arabian Sea and the Bay of Bengal and was a part of the Antipode expedition to the South Pacific and the GEOSECS Indian Ocean Expedition. He was among the scientists who established the Accelerator Mass Spectrometry Facility at the Institute of Physics, Bhubaneswar. He has been a member of the governing council of the National Centre for Antarctic and Ocean Research, the research advisory committee of the Department of Ocean Development, and the executive committee of the International Association of Physical Sciences of the Ocean (IAPSO). He has been involved in the organization of many seminars, served as a member of the Indian National Science Academy during 1988–90 and has mentored 7 doctoral scholars in their studies.

He died on 19 December 2016, at the age of 79.

== Awards and honors ==
The Council of Scientific and Industrial Research awarded Somayajulu the Shanti Swarup Bhatnagar Prize, one of the highest Indian science awards, in 1978. He received the Hari Om Ashram Prerit Award in Oceanology in 1981 and the National Award for Ocean Science and Technology of Ministry of Earth Sciences in 2006. The Indian Academy of Sciences also elected him as a fellow in 1980 and the Indian National Science Academy followed suit three years later. He became an elected fellow of the National Academy of Sciences, India, American Geophysical Union and the European Association of Geochemistry in 1989, 2003 and 2004 respectively. He is also a fellow of the Geological Society of India and the Indian Geophysical Union. The award orations delivered by him include Jawaharlal Nehru Birth Centenary Lecture Award of the Indian National Science Academy in 1997 and the Prof. K. R. Ramanathan Memorial Lecture of Physical Research Laboratory in 2001.

== Selected bibliography ==
=== Books ===
- K. Gopalan; Vinod K. Gaur; B.L.K. Somayajulu; J.D. MacDougall, eds. (1990). From Mantle to Meteorites: A Garland of Perspectives - A Festschrift for Devendra Lal. Indian Academy of Sciences. p. 322. ISBN 978-0-19-562581-3. ASIN 0195625811.

=== Chapters ===
- D. Balasubramanian; B. L. K. Somayajulu (1998). "Contributions of Chronology to Indian Human Heritage". The Indian Human Heritage. Universities Press. ISBN 978-81-7371-128-2.

=== Articles ===
- B. L. K. Somayajuu; T. J. Walsh; C. Radhakrishnamurthy (1975). "Magnetic susceptibility stratigraphy of Pacific Pleistocene sediments". Nature. 253 (5493) (published February 1975): 616–617. Bibcode:1975Natur.253..616S. doi:10.1038/253616a0. S2CID 4276167.
- BLK Somayajulu; R Rengarajan; D Lal; RF Weiss; H Craig (1987). "GEOSECS Atlantic 32 Si profiles". Earth and Planetary Science Letters. 85 (4) (published October 1987): 329–342. doi:10.1016/0012-821X(87)90131-2.
- BLK Somayajulu; R Rengarajan; D Lal; H Craig (1991). "GEOSECS Pacific and Indian Ocean 32 Si profiles". Earth and Planetary Science Letters. 107 (1) (published October 1991): 197–216. doi:10.1016/0012-821X(91)90055-M.
- Somayajulu, B. L. K., Srinivasan, M. S. (2000). "Paleoceanography". Proceedings of the Indian National Science Academy: 77–85.
- R Rengarajan; MM Sarin; BLK Somayajulu; R Suhasini (March 2002). "Mixing in the surface waters of the western Bay of Bengal using 228Ra and 226Ra". Journal of Marine Research. 60 (2): 255–279. doi:10.1357/00222400260497480. S2CID 140538455.
- BLK Somayajulu; R Rengarajan; RA Jani (2002). "Geochemical cycling in the Hooghly estuary, India". Marine Chemistry. 79 (3) (published October 2002): 171–183. Bibcode:2002MarCh..79..171S. doi:10.1016/S0304-4203(02)00062-2.
- M. Tiwari; R. Ramesh; B. L. K. Somayajulu; A. J. T. Juli; G. S. Burr (2005). "Paleomonsoon precipitation deduced from a sediment core from the equatorial Indian Ocean". Geo-Mar Lett. 26 (published 2006): 23–30. doi:10.1007/s00367-005-0012-0. S2CID 129925442.

== See also ==
- Accelerator Mass Spectrometry
