= B. M. Choudary =

Indian inorganic chemist (born 1946)

- Born: 10 August 1946 (age 80); Andhra Pradesh, India
- Education: Andhra University; Vikram University; Gujarat University
- Known for: Studies on Nanomaterials to Nanomedicine
- Awards: 1990 Shanti Swarup Bhatnagar Prize; 2004 GoAP Best Scientist Award
- Scientific career
- Fields: Nanotechnology; Catalysis
- Workplaces: Kakatiya Medical College; Indian Institute of Chemical Technology; Ogene Systems

Boyapati Manoranjan Choudary (born 1946) is an Indian inorganic chemist and a former senior scientist at Indian Institute of Chemical Technology. He is known for his studies on Nanomaterials to Nanomedicine and is an elected fellow of the Indian National Science Academy, and the Indian Academy of Sciences. The Council of Scientific and Industrial Research, the apex agency of the Government of India for scientific research, awarded him the Shanti Swarup Bhatnagar Prize for Science and Technology, one of the highest Indian science awards, in 1990, for his contributions to chemical sciences.

== Biography ==
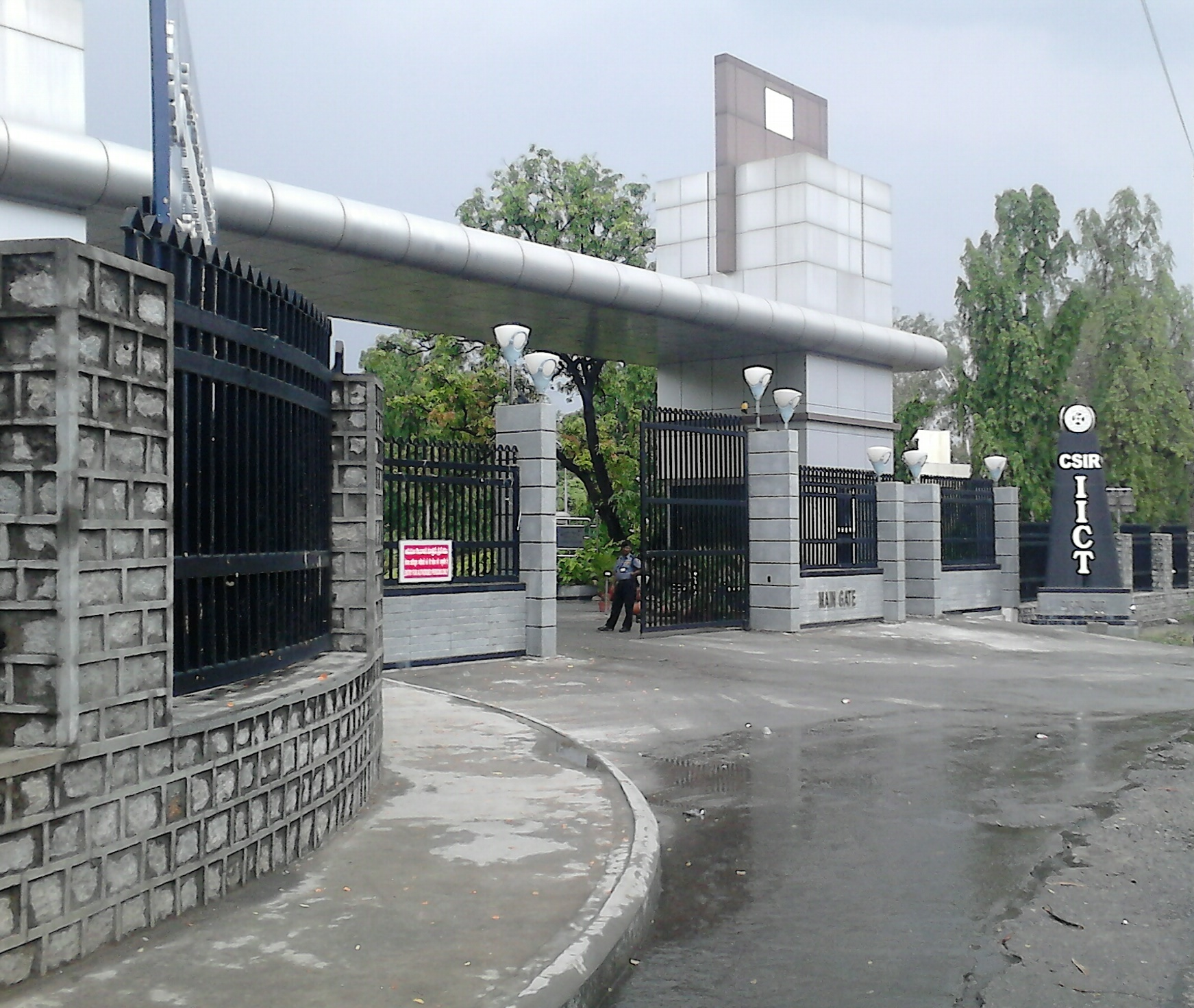
Indian Institute of Chemical Technology

B. M. Choudary, born on 10 August 1946 in the south Indian state of Andhra Pradesh, graduated in chemistry from Andhra University and completed his master's degree at Vikram University. His career started as a junior lecturer in chemistry at Kakatiya Medical College in 1970 and after three years, he joined Indian Institute of Chemical Technology (IICT) as a junior research fellow where he spent the rest of his academic career to retire as a senior scientist. In between, he secured a PhD from Gujarat University in 1980 for his thesis on Catalysis in Organic Chemistry. After retirement, he founded Ogene Systems in 2005 where he serves as the managing director.

Choudary's researches on anchored intercalated catalysts returned high selectivity and activity and his work on homogeneous catalysis using transition metal complexes widened the knowledge on the subject. He established a laboratory for researches on catalysis and surface science at Indian Institute of Chemical Technology and hosted a number of researchers there. He published his research findings by way of several peer-reviewed articles (Note: Please see Selected bibliography section) and Google Scholar, an online repository of scientific particles, has listed 258 of them. He has mentored 50 doctoral scholars in their studies and holds over several US and Indian patents.

In 2005, Choudary founded Ogene Systems, a firm handling research and manufacturing contracts where he guides several teams engaged in research in nanotechnology, nanomedicine, process development and manufacturing. He is a former member of the editorial board of the Journal of Molecular Catalysis A: Chemical and serves as a guest editor for Topics in Catalysis journal. He has also participated in international meetings on catalysis.

== Awards and honors ==
The Council of Scientific and Industrial Research awarded him the Shanti Swarup Bhatnagar Prize, one of the highest Indian science awards, in 1990. The Indian Academy of Sciences elected him as their fellow in 1992 and he became an elected fellow of the Indian National Science Academy in 2004. The same year, the Government of Andhra Pradesh awarded him the Andhra Pradesh Scientist Award. He is also an elected fellow of the Andhra Pradesh Academy of Sciences.

== Citations ==
- B. Viswanathan; C. N. Pillai (1992). Recent Developments in Catalysis: Theory and Practice. Editions TECHNIP. pp. 687–. ISBN 978-2-7108-0626-4.
- R A Sheldon; R A van Santen (30 October 1995). Catalytic Oxidation: Principles and Applications: A Course of the Netherlands Institute for Catalysis Research (NIOK). World Scientific. pp. 201–. ISBN 978-981-4579-71-1.
- Katsuhiko Ariga; Harry Kroto (2012). Manipulation of Nanoscale Materials: An Introduction to Nanoarchitectonics. Royal Society of Chemistry. pp. 159–. ISBN 978-1-84973-415-8.
- Yoshio Ono; Hideshi Hattori (31 August 2012). Solid Base Catalysis. Springer Science & Business Media. pp. 169–. ISBN 978-3-642-18339-3.
- Albert Matlack (5 April 2010). Introduction to Green Chemistry, Second Edition. CRC Press. pp. 177–. ISBN 978-1-4398-8211-5.

== Selected bibliography ==
- Lakshmi Kantam, M.; Chakrapani, L.; Choudary, B. M. (2008). "Baylis-Hillman reaction of cyclic enones with arenecarbaldehydes and N-arylidene-4-methylbenzenesulfonamides by Using NAP-MgO". Synlett. 2008 (13): 1946–1948. doi:10.1055/s-2008-1077959.
- Kantam, M. L.; Ramani, T.; Chakrapani, L.; Choudary, B. M. (2007). "Oxidative kinetic resolution of racemic secondary alcohols catalyzed by resin supported sulfonato-Mn (salen) complex in water". Journal of Molecular Catalysis A: Chemical. 274 (1–2): 11–15. doi:10.1016/j.molcata.2007.04.020.
- Kantam, M. L.; Rao, B.; Choudary, B. M.; Sreedhar, B. (2006). "Selective transfer hydrogenation ofcarbonyl compounds by ruthenium nanoclusters supported on alkali-exchanged zeolite beta". Advanced Synthesis & Catalysis. 348 (14): 1970–1976. doi:10.1002/adsc.200505497.
- Lakshmi Kantam, M.; Roy, Sarabindu; Roy, Moumita; Sreedhar, B.; Choudary, B. M. (2005). "Nanocrystalline magnesium oxide-stabilized palladium(0): an efficient and reusable catalyst for suzuki and stille cross-coupling of Aryl Halides". Advanced Synthesis & Catalysis. 347 (15): 2002–2008. doi:10.1002/adsc.200505198.
- Choudary, Boyapati M.; Jyothi, Karangula; Madhi, Sateesh; Kantam, Mannepalli L. (2004). "Allylation of aldehydes, aldimines and ring opening of terminal aromatic epoxides by scandium triflate using polyethylene glycol (PEG) as an efficient recyclable medium". Synlett. 2 (2): 0231–0234. doi:10.1055/s-2003-44977.

== See also ==
- Nanomedicine
- Nanotechnology
- Catalysis
