= Outlook (Indian magazine) =

Indian news magazine

- The 17th Anniversary Issue of Outlook
- Editor: Chinki Sinha
- Former editors: Rajesh Ramachandran, Krishna Prasad, Vinod Mehta
- Categories: News Magazine
- Circulation: 4,25,000 (as of 2014)
- First issue: October 1995; 30 years ago
- Company: Rajan Raheja Group (Outlook Publishing (India) Private Limited)
- Country: India
- Based in: New Delhi
- Language: English and Hindi
- Website: outlookindia.com (in English); outlookhindi.com (in Hindi)

Outlook is a weekly general interest English and Hindi news magazine published in India.

== History and profile ==
Outlook was first issued in October 1995 with Vinod Mehta as the editor in chief. It is owned by the Rajan Raheja Group. The publisher is Outlook Publishing (India) Pvt. Ltd. It features contents from politics, sports, cinema, and stories of broad interests. By December 2018, Outlook magazine's Facebook following had grown to over 12 lakh (1.2 million).

== Staff ==
=== Editors-in-chief ===
- Vinod Mehta (1995–2012)
- Krishna Prasad (2012–2016)
- Rajesh Ramachandran (2016–2018)

=== Managing editors ===
- Tarun Tejpal (1995 - March 2000)

=== Notable contributors ===
- Arundhati Roy
