= Ravi Vadlamani =

Indian accountant

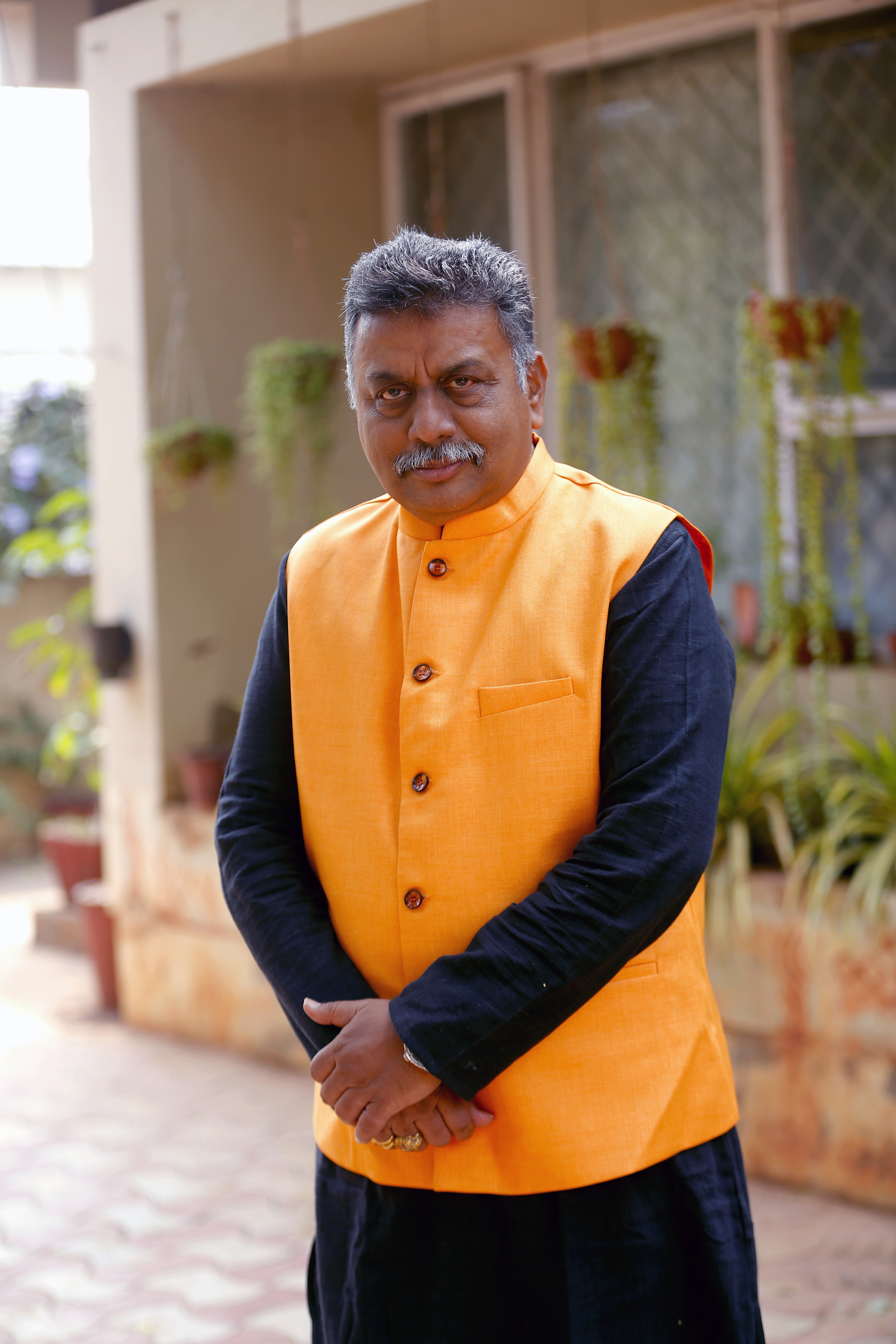
- Born: 21 July 1956 (age 70); Guntur, India
- Education: Andhra University
- Occupation: Chartered accountant
- Spouse: Rajya Lakshmi
- Children: 2

Ravi Vadlamani (born 21 July 1956) is an Indian chartered accountant.

== Education and personal life ==
Vadlamani obtained his Bachelor of Commerce degree from TJPS College at the Andhra University. He did his Chartered Accountancy, A.C.S., F.C.A. Fund Managers Course with the Unit Trust of India.

== Career ==
Vadlamani started his career as a Chartered Accountant in M/s Umamaheswara Rao & Co.

He represented five Southern States as the Regional Council Member of the Institute of Chartered Accountants of India for three years from 1988 to 1991.

Vadlamani has participated in social service programmes of Rotary International. Earlier, he served as the District Governor of RI district 3150.

Overhead reservoirs were built for serving protected drinking water through the distribution networks under the "Water for Life" program in Kothagudem, Katarivaripalem, Nizampatnam and Piduguralla Areas. He participated in the project that provided more than 300 Reverse Osmosis Water Plants in Guntur, Prakasam in Andhra Pradesh and many Telangana Districts, where people are affected by Endemic Skeletal Fluorosis, at a cost of Rs. 5 crores (INR 50 million).

He conceived and implemented a program called 'School on Wheels', to promote education by drawing child labour and children of wage earners to the process of learning. He provided a bus as part of 'School on Wheels' through 'Child and Police' Programme at Guntur at a cost of Rs.12.50 lakhs (INR 1.25 mn) as part of an effort to eradicate child labour. Vadlamani took to launch a project "Raise hand to save our schools", to convert schools without basic amenities into happy schools. Under this program, he took initiation to construct new school buildings, separate toilets for boys and girls. He took it upon himself to distribute five lakh benches free of cost to schools in Telangana. Over the last six years, he has managed to distribute 1.2 lakh benches worth Rs 30 crore. Various school blocks and toilet blocks were built in different schools across Andhra Pradesh and Telangana states of India.

Under the 'SHARE' (Sanitation, Health and Rural Empowerment) project by The Rotary International, he participated in identifying beneficiaries and provided 10,000 sewing machines and thousands of milch cattle to women in Guntur, Prakasam Districts ("End of Poverty" program) and sanitation facilities in 50 villages.

Vadlamani was chairman of the Indian Red Cross, Guntur branch.

In his capacity of convener of Tsunami Relief Cell of Rotary International, Vadlamani could prevail upon the global corporation GE Capital the need to help the tsuniami victims under Corporate Social Responsibility (CSR) initiative. A number of fishermen who had lost their boats, nets and their houses were given seven motorised fibre boats and 30 fishing nets to begin with at a cost of Rs. 14 lakhs.

Vadlamani was a Guest speaker at District Conference of Dist 5470 at Colorado Springs, District 1100 United Kingdom and District 9640 Australia. He is a member of the Directors Nominating Committee 2009 and 2015 and he is also a representative on Council on Representative 2007 and 2016.

Ravi Vadlamani was closely followed by his wife Raaji in his endeavour. Raaji also served as the District Governor of RI District 3150. Their work for Polio eradication was recognized and were awarded regional polio free award.

Ravi and Raaji Vadlamani have achieved Level-4 Major Donor status with the Rotary Foundation.

== Awards ==
- Honorary Doctor of Letters by Acharya Nagarjuna University for his service as a social worker.
