= Vakkom Moulavi =

Indian journalist and reformer (1873–1932)

Vakkom Mohammed Abdul Khader Moulavi
- Born: Mohammed Abdul Khader; 28 December 1873; Vakkom, Kingdom of Travancore (present day Thiruvananthapuram, Kerala, India)
- Died: 31 October 1932 (aged 58); Kingdom of Travancore, British India (present day Kerala, India)
- Known for: Islamic leader, Freedom fighter, Founder and Publisher of Swadeshabhimani, Scholar and Reformer.
- Title: Father of Muslim Community Reform in Kerala
- Movement: Islahi (Reformist Salafism); Salafiyya
- Spouse: Aamina Umma
- Children: 10
- Parents: Muhammad Kunju; Aash Beevi

Vakkom Mohammed Abdul Khader Moulavi (28 December 1873 – 31 October 1932), popularly known as Vakkom Moulavi was a social reformer, teacher, prolific writer, Muslim scholar, journalist, freedom fighter and newspaper proprietor in Travancore, a former princely state in southern India that was located part of the present-day Kerala state. He was the founder and publisher of the newspaper Swadeshabhimani which was banned and confiscated by the Government of Travancore in 1910 due to its criticisms against the government and the Diwan of Travancore, P. Rajagopalachari. He was an avid reader of Rashid Rida’s Islamic magazine, Al-Manar. Vakkom Moulavi is known as the father of Islamic renaissance in Kerala.

== Early life and family ==
Moulavi was born in 1873 in Vakkom, Chirayinkil Taluk, Thiruvananthapuram in Travancore. He was born into the prominent Poonthran family that had originally migrated from Colachel, Tamil Nadu and whose members have played a significant role in the history of Travancore since 19th century. The Poonthran genealogy starts with a prominent landlord Thoppil Thampi, who came from the south-western part of Travancore and settled in Vettoor, Varkala. Vakkom Moulavi's maternal ancestors were from Hyderabad and Anjengo. His maternal grandfather Fateh Khan was a high ranking police officer in Travancore. Fateh Khan's family was originally from Hyderabad.

His father, a prominent merchant, engaged a number of scholars from distant places, including an itinerant Arab savant, to teach him every subject he wished to learn. Moulavi made such rapid progress, that some of his teachers soon found that their stock of knowledge was exhausted and at least one of them admitted that had learnt from his student more than he could teach him. In a short time, Moulavi had learnt many languages including Arabic, Persian, Tamil, Urdu, Sanskrit and English. his ancestral background likewise contributed to his learning and growth in several ways. Muhammad Kannu argues that this family heritage helped Vakkom Moulavi to master the Tamil and Urdu languages.

In early 1900s, Moulavi was married to Haleema, daughter of Aliyar Kunju Poonthran Vilakom and Pathumma Kayalpuram. Moulavi - Haleema couple had one son Abdul Salam. Haleema died soon after the birth of their first child. A year later, Moulavi married Aamina Ummal. The couple had ten children, includes Abdul Hai, Abdul Vahab, Abdul Khader Jr. Abdul Haque, Obaidullah, Ameena, Yahiya, Sakeena, Mohammed Eeza and Mohammed Iqbal. His sons, Abdul Salam, Abdul Vahab and Mohammed Eeza were writers and scholars of Islamic studies, and Abdul Khader Jr was a writer, literary critic and journalist. One of his nephews, Vakkom Majeed, was an Indian freedom fighter and a former member of Travancore-Cochin State Assembly and another nephew, P.Habeeb Mohamed, was the first Muslim judge of the Travancore High Court of Kerala. His disciples included K.M Seethi Sahib, the former Speaker of Kerala Legislative Assembly and a social reformer among kerala Muslims.

== Journalism and Swadeshabhimani ==
Maulavi started the Swadeshabhimani newspaper on 19 January 1905, declaring that "the paper will not hesitate to expose injustices to the people in any form", but on 26 September 1910, the newspaper and press were sealed and confiscated by the Indian Imperial Police, and the editor Ramakrishna Pillai was arrested and banished from Travancore to Thirunelveli.

After the confiscation of the press, Moulavi concentrated more on social and cultural activities, becoming a social leader, also writing several books. Daussabah and Islam Matha Sidantha Samgraham are original works, while Imam Ghazali's Keemiya-e- Saadat, Ahlu Sunnathuwal Jammath, Islamic Sandesam, Surat-ul fathiha are translations.

== Social Reformation ==
Vakkom Moulavi defined religious reform as the endeavour to purify Islam and bring it back to its original form as it was practiced by the Salaf al-Salih (pious ancestors), based on Qur’an and Hadith as the fundamental authorities that decided religious and moral issues. Moulavi distinguished between two terms: Islah al-din and al-Islah al-dini, to articulate his vision of religious reform. The first term, Islah al-din ("reforming religion") implies that Islam needs further reform because its principles are archaic. The latter term, al-Islah al-dini ("religiously based reform") refers to the reformation that rectify the defects that have happened to religion in the course of history and to bring it back to its pure form, as was practiced by the Salaf al-Salih. Thus, according to Moulavi, religious reform is nothing but a revivalist activity aimed at purging Islam of bid‘a (innovations) and shirk and re-establishing pristine Islamic teachings.

Explaining his vision of Islamic Renaissance, Moulavi wrote in his treatise "Islam Mata Navikaranam" (Islamic Religious Renewal):

"Preach sermons, publish articles in newspapers and journals, distribute pamphlets, publish books, and as far as religious education at madrasas is concerned, depend only on the Qur’an and hadith, for its comprehension use only those books and interpretations written by free-thinking great souls (mahatmas), who are not biased towards any particular madhhab....Propagate among the people the teachings of the Qur’an, the words and actions of the Rasul, the practices of the predecessors (Salaf), and true principles related to Tawhid. Point out their beliefs and practices that contradict it and instruct them to reject it. Direct them to accept Kitab and Sunnah as the sole criterion for beliefs and practices."

Moulavi is considered one of the greatest reformers in the Kerala Muslim community, and widely considered as the "Father of Muslim Renaissance in Kerala". He emphasised the religious and socioeconomic aspects much more than the ritualistic aspects of religion. He also campaigned for the need for modern education, the education of women, and the elimination of potentially bad customs among the Muslim community. Influenced by the writings of Muhammad Abduh of Egypt and his reform movement, Moulavi started journals in Arabi-Malayalam and in Malayalam modelled on Al Manar. The Muslim was launched in January 1906 and was followed by Al-Islam(1918) and Deepika(1931). Through these publications, he tried to teach the Muslim community about the basic tenets of Islam. Al-Islam began publishing in April 1918 and played a pivotal role in Muslim renaissance in Kerala. It opposed Nerchas and Uroos festivals amongst the Muslim community, thereby attracting opposition from the orthodox ulema to the extent that they issued a fatwa declaring the reading of it as sacrilege. Financial troubles and lack of readership led to the closure of the journal within five issues, but it is regarded as the pioneer journal that attempted religious reform amongst the Mappilas of Kerala. While it was published in Malayalam language using Arabi-Malayalam script, Muslim and Deepika used Malayalam in script also.

Vakkom Moulavi believed that the Muslim Ummah had declined after the period of the Salaf al-Salih due to ignorance of Islamic teachings, the prevalence of Bid'ah (innovations) and practices of shirk (polytheism). He initiated a reform movement that aimed at purging Muslim culture from all the subsequent innovations, ritual accretions of shirk and revive Islam back to its pristine form. The reforms were based on Qur'an and Hadith, and Moulavi insisted that true Islamic beliefs and practices were in harmony with reason and science. Another reason of Muslim decline was the emergence of deviant doctrinal interpretations, that invented new opinions by misinterpreting the Scriptures. These deviations disfigured Islamic principles to such an extent that it obscured most people from recognizing Islam in its original form. Thus, Islamic religion was stripped of its vigor and vitality which weakened the Muslim mind, intelligence, and consciousness; hindering them from achieving worldly success. Moulavi believed that with the spread of deviant doctrines, the Muslim Ummah had been divided into numerous heretical sects and sub-sects. Like Sayyid Rashīd Ridā, Moulavi asserted that the decline of Muslims was the Divine punishment for their disagreement and disunity upon the truth.

As a result of the continuous campaigning of Moulavi throughout the State, the Maharaja's Government introduced the teaching of Arabic in all state schools where there were Muslim pupils, and offered them fee concessions and scholarships. Girls were totally exempted from payment of fees. Moulavi wrote text books for children to learn Arabic, and a manual for training Arabic instructors for primary schools. At the instance of Moulavi Abdul Qadir the State Government soon instituted qualifying examinations for Arabic teachers of which he was made the chief examiner.

There were many other dubious practices in the Muslim community of the time, such as the dowry system, extravagant expenditure on weddings, celebration of annual "urs" and Moharrum with bizarre unIslamic features bordering on idolatrous rituals. Moulavi launched his campaign against such practices with the help of his disciples, and with the co-operation of other learned men who shared his views and ideals. As the campaign developed into a powerful movement, opposition was mounted by the Mullahs. Some issued "fatwas" that he was a "kafir", others branded him as a "Wahhabi".

He also tried to create unity among Muslims, starting the All Travancore Muslim Mahajanasabha and Chirayinkil Taluk Muslim Samajam, and worked as the chairman of the Muslim Board of the Government of Travancore. His activities were further instrumental in the establishment of "Muslim Aikya Sangham", a united Muslim forum in Eriyad, Kodungalloor for all the Muslims of the Travancore, Cochin and Malabar regions, with K M Moulavi, K M Seethi Sahib, Manappat Kunju Mohammed Haji and helped guide the Lajnathul Mohammadiyya Association of Alappuzha, Dharma Bhoshini Sabha of Kollam amongst others. In 1931, he founded the Islamia Publishing House, with his eldest son Abdul Salam supervising the translation into Malayalam and publication of Allama Shibli's biography of Omar Farooq in two volumes under the title Al Farooq.

== Death ==
'Abd al-Qadir Moulavi died on 31 October 1932 CE /1351 A.H. His funeral rites were conducted by his disciples strictly according to the Sunnah; without local superstitions and innovations. A few days later, Syrian-Egyptian Salafi scholar Mūhammād Rashīd Ridâ would publish a eulogy of the Moulavi in his Al-Manar journal. Introducing 'Abd al-Qadir as a reformer who was "his friend in Malabar"; Rida wrote:

"As for his [Shaykh 'Abd al-Qadir's] Madh'hab of Tajdid [revival] and Islah [reform], he was a Salafi in it. He did not say to blindfollow any school which was not the Madh'hab of Ahlus-Sunnah wal-Jama'ah, calling for the abandonment of all customs and actions of Shirk (polytheism), superstitions and religious innovations (bid'ah) by adhering to the Book and the Sunnah, and the biography of the Salaf us-Salih (may God be pleased with them). Although he was independent in research and thinking, in principles of Renewal (Tajdid) and Reform (Islah) he was in accordance with the guidance of Al-Manar magazine, loving it and its owner, Al-Sayyid Muhammad Rashid Rida... he also loved the wise men of Islam and the East, ... such as Shaykh Al-Islam Ibn Taymiyyah and his disciples, Shaykh al-Islam, the Murshid of the people of Najd, Muhammad ibn 'Abd al-Wahhab and defended them in his work Dau-us-Sabah (Morning Light) conveying in the language of Malabari peoples. He also loved the Imam of the Kingdom of Saudi Arabia, 'Abdul Aziz bin Al-Saud.."

== See also ==
- Swadeshabhimani (newspaper)
- Justice Habeeb Mohamed
- Vakkom Majeed
- Ramakrishna Pillai

== See Also (social reformers of Kerala) ==
- Sree Narayana Guru
- Dr. Palpu
- Kumaranasan
- Rao Sahib Dr. Ayyathan Gopalan
- Brahmananda Swami Sivayogi
- Vaghbhatananda
- Mithavaadi Krishnan
- Moorkoth Kumaran
- Mahatma Ayyankali
- Ayya Vaikundar
- Pandit Karuppan
- Kuriakose Elias Chavara
