= Vakkom Abdul Khader =

Indian revolutionary (1917–1943)

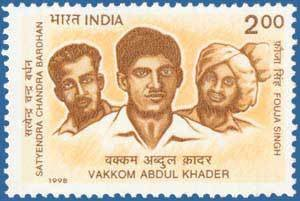
- Martyr Vakkom Abdul Khader
- Born: 25 May 1917; Vakkom, Trivandrum, Travancore
- Died: 10 September 1943 (aged 26); St. George Fort, Madras, British India
- Cause of death: Execution by hanging
- Occupations: A soldier in Indian National Army, which was led by Netaji Subhas Bose
- Parents: Vavakunju (father); Ummu Salma (mother)

Vakkom Abdul Khader (1917–1943) was a member of the Indian National Army, which fought for India's freedom, under Subhas Chandra Bose, allied with Japan. Abdul Khader was a trained radio communicator. He was hanged in Madras Central Jail on 10 September 1943 with three comrades: Satyen Bardhan, Anandan and Fauja Singh. All the three walked to their execution singing Vande Mataram. Abdul Khader also shouted "Netaji Subhas Babu ki jai! Down with the British Government! Victory to India!"

== Early life and career ==
Abdul Khader was born on 25 May 1917, at Vakkom, Thiruvananthapuram District. His father was Vavakunju and mother was Ummusalma. He attended local primary school and received his secondary education at Sree Narayana Vilasa high school (founded by Sree Narayan Guru). He was a school hero and a good football player. He was active in the freedom struggle, delighting people with his exciting patriotic songs. During Mahatma Gandhi’s visit to Kerala, the train stopped at Kadakkavur railway station, where locals proudly said that Gandhiji was garlanded in the midst of a large crowd by a young boy named Abdul Khader.

In 1938, when he was 21, Khader moved to Malaysia at his father’s behest, and joined the engineering section of the Public Works Department. The excitement of the Indian freedom struggle, however, shook Khader's mind. He joined the Indian Independence League, which was fighting for Indian independence in Malaysia at that time, and later became a revolutionary leader. He was also the secretary of the Kerala Muslim Union, a group of Kerala Muslims in Malaysia who collaborated with the Independence League. Khader joined the Indian National Army, which was formed by Netaji Subhas Bose, its Commander-in-Chief. After completing his training at the Indian Swaraj Institute (housed in the Free School, Penang, now the Penang Museum), which was set up to train Indian National Army soldiers, Khader became a member of the Choir Squad, a corps of heroes It was decided to send them to India in 3 batches. Japanese submarines were to transport 5 revolutioneries each in two batches to Tanur (in the Malabar coast) and Dwarka (in the Kathiawar coast). Rubber rafts were arranged for landing.

It is reported that it was the decision of a Japanese colonel by the name Hideo Iwakuro to send the cadets to India with a plan to deploy them across India. The colonel did not consult the INA, and the operation failed as the cadets were sent underprepared they were dropped off carelessly.

== Revolutionary activities ==
Abdul Khader, S.A. Anandan and three others landed at Tanur in Malabar Coast on the night of September 27, 1942. On landing, they were noticed by some men on the shore before they could find a safe hideout, and were looked upon with suspicion. The police was informed and Khader and his comrades were arrested within a few hours of their landing.

== Trial and sentence ==
After all of the twenty men including Abdul Khader, Satyen Bardhan, Fauja Singh and Anandan were arrested, they were then removed to Fort St. George, India at Madras in due course of time. They were even tortured in Madras Fort in order to tell all the secret about their intention to enter India, which was their own Motherland.. Special judge E E Mack was in charge of conducting the trial. He soon realised that there was no proper law available to implicate them.

Enemy Agents Ordinance1943 was then promulgated in January, 1943 and in February the trial was undertaken under Section 3 of this ex-post-facto law, well against the basic legal principle of Non-retroactivity and four INA soldiers including Abdul Khader was sentenced to death.

== Death and legacy ==
The soldiers of the Indian National Army, Abdul Khader and his three comrades Satyen Bardhan, Fauja Singh and Anandan were executed in the Madras Penitentiary on 10 September 1943. Almost the whole night previous to the executions the prison reverberated with the song Vande Mataram. He wrote in his latter to his father:

"In this struggle of freedom which resembles a full moon; I am a candle. May Allah give you the strength to realise that your son will breathe his last at 6am and you won’t see him tomorrow.....God has bestowed upon me a peaceful and tranquil mind. In the present helpless position, nothing is in our hands to change the verdict. Don't be disturbed. In this holy month of Ramadan let's accept it as God's will in the form of sacrifice on the altar of freedom of motherland. Man is destined to death as every animal. But he can give it a purpose and perfume. That's what I did. I did everything purposefully, sincerely and selflessly. The clock is about to strike twelve midnight. The initial moments of the day of my death are closing up…I have no consolation to offer you. We shall meet in heaven. Do not grieve for me…From the eye witnesses of my death, one day you will learn how calmly and bravely I faced death. You will be proud and happy then."

With great courage, each of them, Abdul Khader, Satyen Bardhan, Fauja Singh and Anandan, ascended the steps to the gallows while raising the slogan of Vande Mataram, which meant "Hail my Motherland". Abdul Khader himself raised the slogan "Netaji Subhas Babu ki jai! Down with the British Government! Victory to India!"

Khader and others were executed at on Friday, 10 September 1943, at twelve o'clock midnight.

A small memorial is built at Travancore in their memory. India Post issued a stamp in memory of Vakkom Abdul Khader on 25 May 1998 (PSS No.1791).
