= Konamaneni Amareswari =

Indian judge

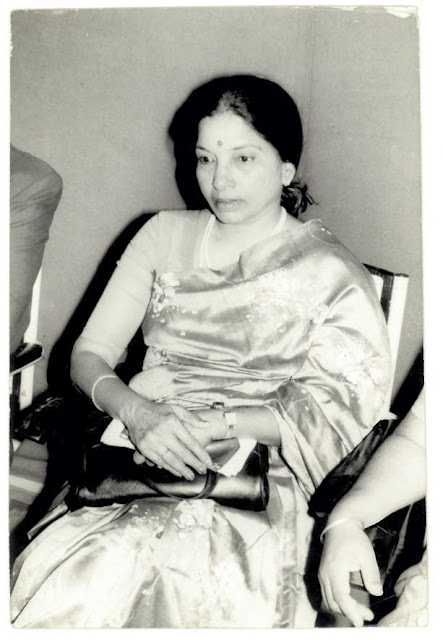
K. Amareswari

Justice K. Amareswari (1928–2009) was the first woman judge of the Andhra Pradesh High Court.

Amareswari was born in Appikatla village in Guntur district. She graduated with a master's degree in Politics and History from Andhra University College of Law in 1949. She completed her bachelor's in law from the same university.

She was a member of the Bar Council from 1960 to 1961 and was appointed Judge directly from the Bar. She was the first woman judge of the Andhra Pradesh High Court.

She was the vice-president of the Indian Federation of Women Lawyers. She also worked as the vice-president of the Andhra Pradesh High Court Advocates Association in 1975–1976. On 29 April 1978, she was appointed permanent Judge for Andhra Pradesh High Court.

She died on 25 July 2009, in New Delhi where she had been practising as a senior advocate at the Supreme Court. She is survived by a son and daughter. Chief Minister Y.S. Rajasekhara Reddy and several other political leaders conveyed their condolences to the family.
