= T. S. Satyan =

Indian photojournalist

T S Satyan
- Born: Tambrahalli Subramanya Satyanarayana Iyer; 18 December 1923; Mysore, Kingdom of Mysore
- Died: 13 December 2009 (aged 85); Mysore, India
- Occupation: Photographer

Tambrahalli Subramanya Satyanarayana Iyer, popularly known T. S. Satyan (18 December 1923 – 13 December 2009) was an Indian photojournalist.

== Background ==
Satyan was born and educated in Mysore. He studied at the city's Banumaiah school and gained his Bachelor of Arts degree from Maharaja College. In 2004 he

== Professional career ==
Satyan began his journalism career with a state English daily Deccan Herald (https://en.wikipedia.org/wiki/T._S._Satyan?wprov=sfla1) and worked for The Illustrated Weekly before quitting the profession to become a freelancer and take up the assignments of UNICEF. He began working for WHO as a freelance photojournalist in the early 1960s. From 1961 to 1963, he worked with the WHO Regional Office in South-East Asia to produce several photo reports on health work in India. He photographed WHO's smallpox eradication campaign as well as eye-care, nursing and school health programmes. His work was featured in several issues of the World Health magazine.

His images were regularly published in the Illustrated Weekly of India, Life, Time, India Today, Outlook, Deccan Herald and Newsweek.

In 2005, his memoir Alive and Clicking was published by Penguin Random House India.

== Death ==
Satyan died on 13 December 2009 after suffering a brain haemorrhage. He is survived by his wife Nagarathna, two sons and a daughter.

== Awards and recognitions ==
- Honorary Doctorate degree from Mysore University – 2004
- Awarded the Padma Shri – 1977
- An exhibition of his photographs sponsored by UNICEF at the United Nations headquarters in New York City to mark the International Year of the Child – 1979

== Bibliography ==
- Exploring Karnataka
- Hampi – the Fabled Capital of the Vijaynagar Empire
- In Love with Life
- Kalakke Kannadi – his memoirs in Kannada
- Alive and Clicking
