= Cattamanchi Ramalinga Reddy =

Indian poet and political thinker

C. R. Reddy
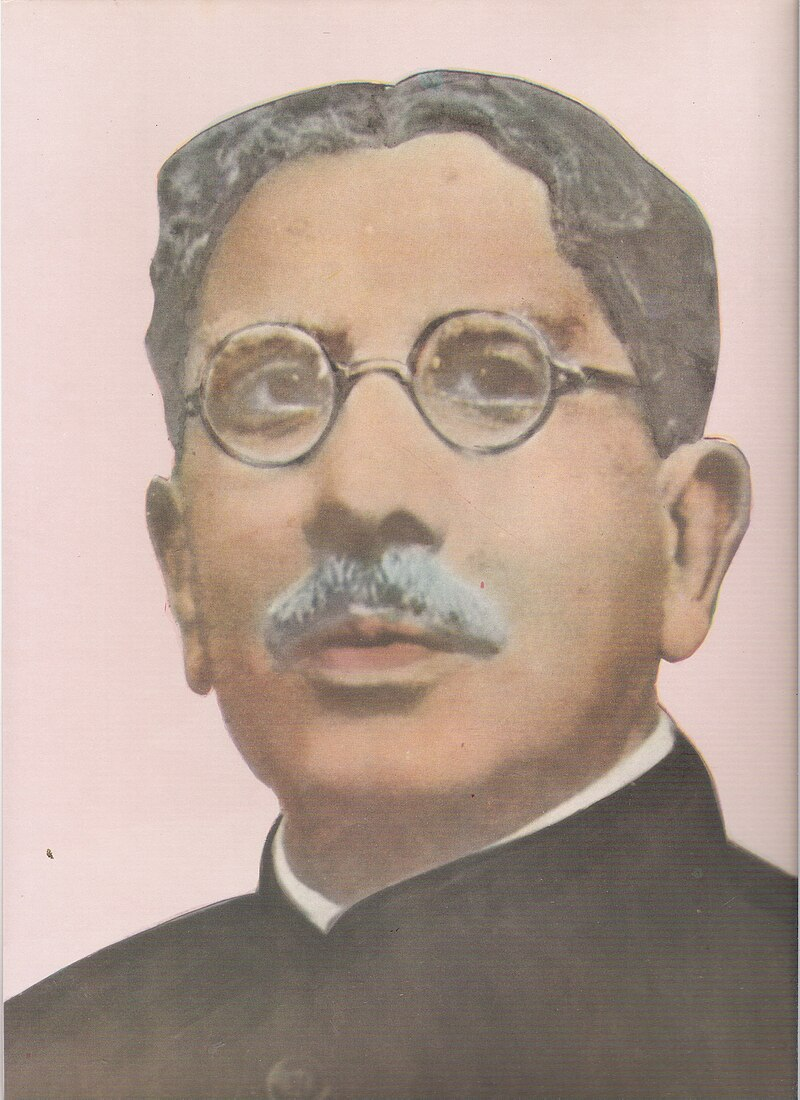
- Sir Reddy in 1940s
- Born: Cattamanchi Ramalinga Subrahmanya Reddy; 10 December 1880; Kattamanchi, Chittoor city, Andhra Pradesh
- Died: 24 February 1951 (aged 70); Madras, Tamil Nadu, India
- Occupations: Politician, educationist, essayist, & economist
- Political party: Justice Party

Sir Cattamanchi Ramalinga Reddy (10 December 1880 – 24 February 1951), also popularly known as Sir C. R. Reddy, was an educationist and political thinker, essayist and economist, poet and literary critic. He was a prominent member of the Justice Party and an ardent champion of the non-Brahmin movement, joining the movement to unite the non-Brahmin communities. He wrote his works in Telugu and English; these reveal his deep love for Indian classics and his learning in these texts, as well as the modernity of his outlook.

Reddy was the educationalist who played a major role in shaping the educational policy in India. He was also the recipient of a British Knighthood in honour of his service to the country. He was the founder of Andhra University and also served as its first Vice-Chancellor from 1926 to 1931 and in a further second term from 1936 to 1949.

== Early life ==
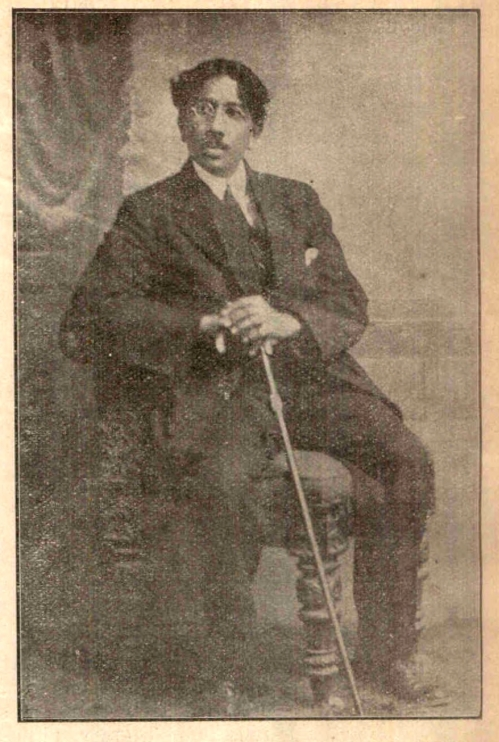

Reddy was born to late Sri Subrahmanya Reddy and late Smt. Narayanamma in Kattamanchi, a suburb of Chittoor city. He was the second son of Subrahmanya Reddy, who had built up a lucrative legal practice as a pleader in Chittoor and was known for his high sense of principles and right conduct. C. R. Reddy was named after his grandfather, who was a poet. He had two brothers, Narasimha Reddy and Bhaskara Reddy . ( sourced from The Incarnate Word - https://incarnateword.in (pp. 469–470)

Reddy completed his high school education in PCR High School in Chittoor with distinction in 1896 and joined the prestigious Madras Christian College in 1897. At Madras Christian College, he was the senior of Sarvepalli Radhakrishnan, whom C. R. Reddy shared a close friendship with. Rev Dr Miller was the principal of the college in which Dr Skinner was the professor of Philosophy and Professor Kellet took English classes. All of them were greatly impressed by Reddy's performance as a student and noted the qualities of his sharp and incisive mind.

While as a student of Madras Christian College, when Reddy was about 19, was encouraged to write for a poetry competition held by the Andhra Bhashabhiranjam Sangham. Samardhi Rangaiah Chetti, the Patron of the Sangham, was responsible for persuading him to do it. Reddy wrote 'Musalamma Maranamu', which was printed a year in 1900. Excerpt from the book - Makers of Indian Literature DR. C. R. REDDY - at the behest of Sahitya Akademi by Shri. D. Anjaneyulu in 1973 to commemorate Cattamanchi Ramalinga Reddy, after researching archives from Nehru Memorial Museum and Library, New Delhi with permission from the then Mr. B.R Nanda (Director) and Mr. V.C Joshi (Director of Archives).

It had unique features and was viewed as an avant-garde effort in the field of Telugu poetry, quite different from the traditional prabhanda style.

== Career ==
In 1901, Reddy graduated with distinction in philosophy and history securing several University prizes. Soon thereafter, he won a Government of India scholarship to study at the University of Cambridge in England. He joined St. John's College at Cambridge in 1902. His career at St John's College, Cambridge, was no less distinguished than it had been at Madras Christian College. Apart from being a brilliant student, he made his mark as an outstanding speaker and debater. He was elected Secretary of the Liberal Club and later Vice-President of the Union Society. He was the first Indian student to be chosen for that office in the Union Society. When he was the Vice-President of the Union Society, future economist John Maynard Keynes was the Secretary. On 31 October 1905, Reddy invited Gopal Krishna Gokhale to address the Union Society. When Gokhale met Keynes, he instantaneously recognised the genius of Keynes and commented, "You are eminently fitted to be a Finance Member in the Viceroy's Executive Council in India".

Even as a student in Cambridge, Reddy campaigned on behalf of the Liberal Party in the 1906 general election which swept the Liberal Party into power that year. Many British politicians admired Reddy's gifts of intellect and eloquence and predicted a great future for him.

On his return to India in 1907, Reddy joined Baroda college at Baroda as vice-principal in the place vacated by Sri Aurobindo.

Reddy's next appointment was at Maharaja's College, Mysore as professor of History in 1913. He was promoted as principal in 1916 and simultaneously appointed as Inspector General of Education in the Mysore State. It was during this period that Reddy with great foresight threw open all the schools to Panchama children much against the local orthodox opposition. This was long before the days of Mahatma Gandhi's programme of temple entry for Harijans. Reddy is a revered name in Karnataka even today for this epoch-making step of social reform.

In 1921, he entered politics. He was elected to the Madras Legislative Council as an outstanding educationalist. For a short while he was in the Justice party. The Justice Party (India) found him far too brilliant and individualistic for keeping proper party control over him. In 1926 January, when it was decided to establish Andhra University at Waltaire, Reddy was the natural choice for appointment as its first Vice-Chancellor. He made Andhra University a great centre of higher education and outstanding research in both sciences and humanities. Towards the end of 1930, he did the extraordinary thing of resigning his Vice-Chancellorship in protest against the repressive policy of the Government of India in arresting the great leaders of Congress Salt Satyagraha movement. He wrote a classic letter in this context to the Governor of Madras. When he resigned his post as Vice-Chancellor, he was succeeded by Dr Sarvepalli Radhakrishnan.

Reddy was back again in the field of politics. He became the president of Chittoor District Board. In 1936, at a Senate meeting of Andhra University, it was decided to invite Reddy to return again to Andhra University as its Vice-Chancellor. He returned to Waltaire later that year for the second time as Vice-Chancellor and retained the position till 1949. During this period, the Andhra University became internationally known. Dr S Bhagavantam, Dr T R Seshadri, Dr V K R V Rao and Dr V S Krishna, K. R. Srinivasa Iyengar and many other great professors made a beeline to Waltaire, inspired by the idealism and unique moral leadership of Reddy. Reddy was knighted by the British government in the 1942 New Year Honours. In 1949, Reddy became the Pro-chancellor of Mysore University. He died in Madras on 24 February 1951.

Iyengar, in his book "Essays and Addresses", describes Reddy as a great educationist, a first-class teacher, humanist, a bold thinker and a reformer. Reddy's lectures on "University reforms" delivered in Madras under the presidency of Dr S. Subramania Iyer, S. Srinivasa Iyengar and T. V. Seshagiri Iyer had set the tone for university reforms in India. Following Reddy's death, the Maharaja of Mysore Jayachamarajendra Wadiyar recalled, "[Reddy] served Mysore in various capacities every one of which was characterised by conspicuous ability, uncommon zeal and indefatigable energy."

== Works ==
- Arthashastra
- Vijnana Chandrika seris
- Bilhaniyamu
- Musalamma Maranamu
