= Kattamanchi =

Suburb of Chittoor in Chittoor district, Andhra Pradesh, India

Coordinates: 13.226°N 79.109°E

Kattamanchi is suburb of Chittoor in Chittoor district, Andhra Pradesh, India. It is on the banks of the Neeva River. It connects the national highway from Chittoor to Tirupathi, Kadapa and Kurnool. In Kattamanchi the language spoken is Telugu. It is a pilgrimage center.

== Notable people ==
- Cattamanchi Ramalinga Reddy, an Indian poet and political thinker, was born in Kattamanchi.
- Panapakkam Anandacharlu, an Indian lawyer, freedom fighter, founding delegate and later president of the Indian National Congress, was born in Kattamanchi.
