= Vakkom =

- village
- Location in Kerala, India Vakkom (India)
- Coordinates: 8.69°N 76.77°E
- Country: India
- State: Kerala
- District: Thiruvananthapuram
- Talukas: Chirayinkeezhu

Government
  - Body: Gram panchayat
  - Panchayat President: Lalija

Area
  - Total: 5.6 km^{2} (2.2 sq mi)

Population (2001)
  - Total: 20,899
  - Density: 3,700/km^{2} (9,700/sq mi)

Languages
  - Official: Malayalam
- Time zone: UTC+5:30 (IST)
- PIN: 695308
- Telephone code: 91 (0)470
- Vehicle registration: KL 16
- Literacy: 90.6%
- Lok Sabha constituency: ATTINGAL
- Legislative constituency: Attingal
- Distance from Thiruvananthapuram: 35 kilometres (22 mi) N (land)
- Distance from Attingal: 8 kilometres (5.0 mi) W (land)
- Distance from Kollam: 48 kilometres (30 mi) S (land)

Vakkom is an area of the Thiruvananthapuram Metropolitan Area near Kadakkavoor in the Thiruvananthapuram district of Kerala, India. It is 35 km north of Thiruvananthapuram, the state capital. Vakkom Panchayat is surrounded by backwaters Anjuthengu kayal ( people in Vakkom calls it as Panayilkadavu kayal )

The total area of Vakkom is 5.06 km^{2}.

At the 2011 India census, Vakkom had a population of 19,267 with 8,319 males and 10,948 females.

== Notable residents ==
- Vakkom Moulavi (1873 - 1932), Islamic renaissance leader, social reformer, Muslim scholar, Educationist and the founder of Swadeshabhimani newspaper.
- Vakkom Majeed (1909-2000), Indian freedom fighter, politician and a former member of the Travancore-Cochin State Assembly.
- Vakkom Abdul Khader (1917-1943), Indian freedom fighter and Indian National Army member who hanged by the British Government in 1943.
- Vakkom Purushothaman (1928-2023), Indian Politician, former governor of Mizoram and Andaman and Nicobar Islands.Died in Thiruvananthapuram
