= Svadeshabhimani (newspaper) =

- Type: Weekly newspaper
- Format: Broadsheet
- Owner: Vakkom Moulavi
- Editor-in-chief: Ramakrishna Pillai
- Founded: 1905; 121 years ago
- Ceased publication: 1910
- Language: Malayalam
- Headquarters: Thiruvananthapuram

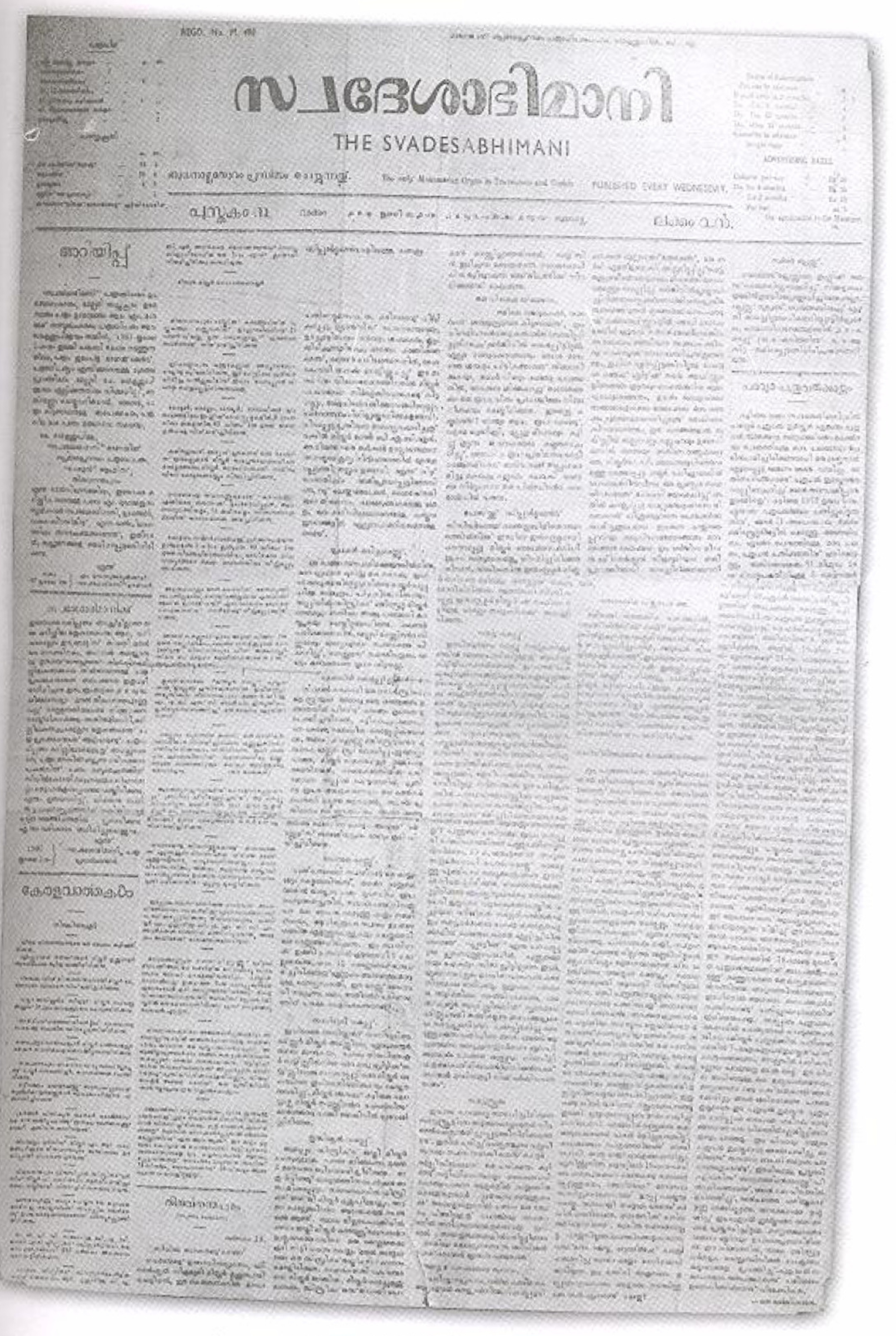
Front page of an issue.

Svadeshabhimani (transl. The Patriot) was a newspaper published in the Kingdom of Travancore, which was banned and confiscated by the Government of Travancore in 1910 due to its criticisms against the government and the Diwan of Travancore, P. Rajagopalachari.

== History ==
Vakkom Muhammed Abdul Khadir Moulavi alias Vakkom Moulavi founded the weekly newspaper on 19 January 1905, to spearhead the fight against corruption and to struggle for the democratic rights of the people in Travancore. He managed to import, directly from England, an automatic flatbed printing press, the latest type then available. The press operated from Anjuthengu (Anglican: Anjengo), a British colony at the time directly ruled by British East India Company.

C P Govinda Pillai was the editor of before Ramakrishna Pillai took over as the editor in January 1906. Ramakrishna Pillai and his family had to shift to Vakkom in Chirayinkil Taluk where the newspaper office and the printing press were located.

In July 1907, both the newspaper office and the family moved to Thiruvananthapuram. Though Vakkom Moulavi was still the proprietor, Ramakrishna had been given total freedom in the running of the newspaper by Moulavi. Although there were never any legal or financial contracts between the two, Moulavi provided all the financial aid to set up the press.

On 26 September 1910, the newspaper and the printing press were sealed and confiscated by the Indian Imperial Police. Ramakrishna Pillai was arrested and banished from Travancore to Thirunelveli in Madras Province of British Raj.

"Many nationalists and Indian newspapers reacted to the arrest and banishment of Ramakrishna Pillai and the banning of the paper. However, countering the king and the British Government that overruled the king, was not easy. Yet, early in the first half of the twenties, the banned newspaper was revived by the mighty will of K. Kumar of Travancore, the veteran Gandhian and Freedom Fighter. He viewed the revival as a befitting tribute to Ramakrishna Pillai. Kumar himself was its manager and chief-editor. He was assisted in his efforts by K. Narayana Kurukkal, a close colleague of Ramakrishna Pillai and the author of the novels: "Parappuram" and "Udayabhanu" besides Barrister A K Pillai. Ramakrishna Pillai's wife, B. Kalyani Amma, Pillai's associates K. Narayana Kurukkal, R. Narayana Panikker and the famous political-journalist Raman Menon and K. Kumar himself were regular contributors to the magazine. The paper was revived under the same name 'Swadeshabhimani' and had its headquarters in the building currently housing the DPI Office at Thycaud, Thiruvananthapuram. In spite of all these, the government wisely chose to remain silent. The new 'Swadeshabhimani' was re-modeled after "Modern Review" of Ramand Chatterjee. It continued its legacy as a significant force transforming the socio-political life of Kerala. K. Kumar had great admiration for Ramakrishna Pillai and he took the lead role in organizing the deportation-day of Pillai as "Ramakrishna Pillai Day" (from M.E: 10-02-1098) and erecting his statue in Trivandrum. Ramakrishna Pillai Day continued to be commemorated in Trivandrum for a long time thereafter.[18] It appears that the editorship of Swadeshabhimani passed on to A.K Pillai (by 1932) who also edited the "Swarat" with the help and support of K. Kumar."
(Quoted from Swadeshabhimani Ramakrishna Pillai, Wikipedia)

In 1957, after the Independence of India, the Government of Kerala returned the press to Moulavi's family and son Abdul Kadar. On 26 January 1968, the then Chief Minister of Kerala, E. M. S. Namboodiripad, presented it to the legal heirs of Maulavi Abdul Qadir at a public meeting, 36 years after his death.

== See also ==
- Media in Kerala
- Swadeshabhimani Ramakrishna Pillai
- Vakkom Moulavi
