= Kerala Yukthivadi Sangham =

Rationalist group based in Kerala

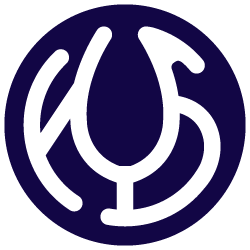
- കേരള യുക്തിവാദി സംഘം (KYS)
- Founded: 1969; 57 years ago
- Location: Kerala, India
- Affiliations: Associate Member, Humanist International, headquartered in London
- Website: keralayukthivadisangham.org

Kerala Yukthivadi Sangham (KYS, lit. 'Kerala Rationalist Association') is a rationalist organization based in Kerala, India. The organization says it stands for rationalism and humanism. It is the initiator of the umbrella organization for rationalism and humanism, Federation of Indian Rationalist Associations.The Rationalist Movement in Kerala had started with the Sahodara Sangham (Fraternity Forum), formed by K. Ayyappan on May 29, 1917, at Cherai, in Ernakulam. This fraternity forum propagated 'Mishra Bhojanam' (feasting without caste discrimination), which was unthinkable as well as very revolutionary at the time. These movements paved way for a rationalist organization (Yukthivadi Sangham) which started functioning in 1967. Kerala Yukthivadi Sangham is the continuation of this parent avatar. The organization started functioning in 1967. It has units in all the districts in Kerala and in the Union Territorial district of Mahi. Yukthirekha, a monthly in Malayalam, is the official magazine of Kerala Yukthivadi Sangham, which has been in circulation since 1983. KYS has a youth wing, Humanist Youth Movement, and a parallel wing, Kerala Misra Vivahavedi, a sub-organisation for the cause of inter-religious and inter-caste married lives. KYS also manages A T Kovoor Trust and Pavanan Institute. KYS is an associate organization of International Humanist Ethical Union, now Humanist International, headquartered in London.

== History ==
Kerala rationalist movement is a continuation of Sri Narayana Movement. Sahodaran Ayyappan a favorite disciple of Sri Narayana Guru, changed the Guru's slogan Oru Jati, Oru Matham, Oru Daivam Manushyanu (One Caste, One Religion, One God for Human-beings) to Jati Venda, Matham Venda, Daivam Venda Manushyanu (No Caste, No Religion, No God for Human-beings). Ayyappan organized the Sahodara Sangham (The Brotherhood Association), and started two magazines “Sahodaran” and “Yukthivadi”.

In 1935 a Yukthivadi Sangham was registered at Kochi, M. C. Joseph as secretary and Panampilly Govinda Menon as treasurer. M. C. Joseph managed Yukthivadi magazine without any interruption For forty five years until June 1974. The existing Kerala Yukthivadi Sangham (KYS) was formed at Kozhikode in 1969 May Adv. M. Prabha as president and P.S. Raman Kutty as Secretary. Yukthi Darsanam is the philosophical text of KYS. Many militant rationalists like MBK, Joseph Edamaruku, P.V. Velayudhan Pilla, U.Kalanadhan, Pavanan, Johnson Eyeroor, Padmanabhan Pallath, Gangan Azikode, Rajagopal Vakathanam, Dhanuvachapuram Sukumaran, Sabhari Girish, Adv. Anil Kumar etc. had led the KYS in different times.

The organization publishes a monthly magazine, Yukthirekha in Malayalam and a quarterly The Secular Humanist in English. The well-known rationalist Pavanan was founder and editor of Yukithirekha and was president of the organization for several years. Other presidents have included U. Kalanathan.

Like many rationalist organizations in India they conduct demonstrations to expose god men as frauds. They also support those who defy fundamentalist taboos and support inter-caste marriages. They have also been involved in public debate over school textbooks.

The organization claims over 3,000 members across Kerala.

== See also ==
- Maharashtra Rationalist Association
- Sapiens Foundation
