= Yukthi Rekha =

Magazines from KYS

- Format: Demy 1/4
- Owner: Kerala Yukthivadi Sangham
- Founder: Pavanan
- Editor: Rajagopal Vakathanam
- Website: keralayukthivadisangham.org

Yukthi Rekha (യുക്തിരേഖ) is a rationalist periodical published monthly in Malayalam. It is the official magazine of the Kerala Yukthivadi Sangham, a rationalist organization. Founded in 1984 by Kerala Yukthivadi Sangham, Yukthi Rekha was initially edited by Pavanan. Kesavan Vellikulangara also served on the magazine's editorial board.
