= Sahodaran =

Defunct Malayalam newspaper

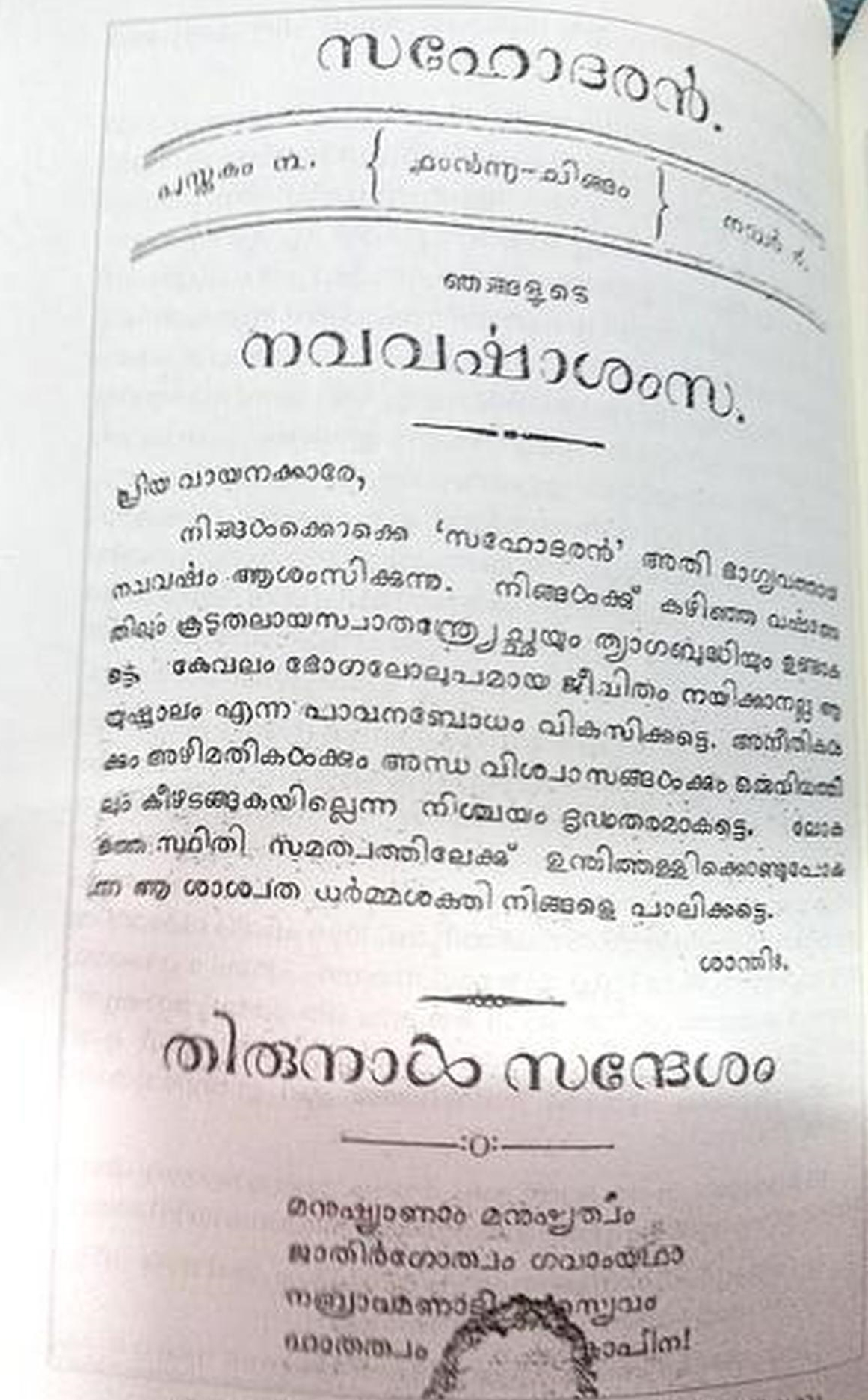
The cover page of the August 1920 edition of Sahodaran

Sahodaran (Malayalam: സഹോദരൻ, meaning Brother) was an Indian Malayalam-language newspaper published in Kerala from 1917 to 1956. It was the mouthpiece of Sahodara Sangham, an organisation founded by Sahodaran Ayyappan to promote rationalistic thoughts and social justice and to fight against superstitions that prevailed in the society .

== Overview ==
After organising Misra Bhojanam in Cherai in May 1917, Ayyappan wrote an article on the need to sweep away superstitions and sent it to Mithavadi, a prominent newspaper of the time run by Thiyyas. Mithavadi rejected the article and Ayyappan realised the need for a publication in order to propagate his rational thoughts. This led to the birth of Sahodaran. Its first issue was published in September 1917 from Pallippuram near Ernakulam. It was initially published monthly. Ayyappan himself was the editor and it was printed at S. P. Press in Paravur.

In 1918, Sahodaran became a bimonthly and the publication was shifted from Pallippuram to Trivandrum. In 1920, the publication was again shifted to Ernakulam and the printing was done in Trichur. After a brief stoppage, Sahodaran resumed publication as a weekly from Mattancherry in May 1925. It was again shifted to Ernakulam in 1937. Sahodaran strongly advocated for rationalism, socialism, labour movement, intermarriage, temple entry for the underprivileged and responsible governance. A number of articles on communist ideology appeared in Sahodaran. An illustrated biography of Lenin was published in the annual edition of 1929.

Sahodaran ceased publication in June 1956, amid Ayyappan's efforts to turn it into a daily. An effort to relaunch the magazine was made in January 2021. M. K. Sanu, who was associated with Sahodaran, was the chief editor of the relaunched magazine.
