= C. P. Rajendran =

Indian geologist (born 1955)

Chittenipattu Puthenveettil Rajendran
- Born: 29 May 1955 (age 71); Ottapalam, Palakkad, Kerala, India
- Education: Kerala University; Cochin University of Science and Technology University of South Carolina
- Known for: Tectonics Earthquake geology Paleoseismology
- Spouse: Kusala Rajendran
- Parent(s): Pavanan & Parvathy pavanan
- Awards: National Geoscience Award (2009)
- Scientific career
- Fields: Geoscience
- Workplaces: Indian Institute of Science; Centre for Earth Science Studies Jawaharlal Nehru Centre for Advanced Scientific Research National Institute of Advanced Studies

Chittenipattu Puthenveettil Rajendran (born 29 May 1955), also known among his peers as CP, is an Indian geoscientist who has worked mainly on Indian earthquakes and tectonics.

== Education ==
Rajendran did his schooling in Thiruvananthapuram (Trivandrum) and Chennai and did his BSc (1976) in Geology from University College, Kerala University and MSc (1978) from Cochin University of Science and Technology. He joined Centre for Earth Science Studies, CESS as a research scientist. After obtaining PhD from the Cochin University of Science and Technology in 1988, he moved to the University of South Carolina (USA) for postdoctoral studies and continued working there until 1993. Rajendaran is son of Pavanan, a well-known rationalist, literary critic and left-wing political activist from kerala. He is married to Prof. Kusala Rajendran, a fellow researcher at the CESS, who later joined the faculty at the Indian Institute of Science, Bengaluru. They have a son.

== Profession ==
CP moved back to Centre for Earth Science Studies, Trivandrum in 1994 where he continued till 2008. He accepted Ramanujan National Fellowship by the Government of India at the Indian Institute of Science, IISc in 2009 and worked at the new centre initiated on Earth Science until 2013. After completing his tenure at the IISc, he joined the Jawaharlal Nehru Centre for Advanced Scientific Research (JNCASR) in Bengaluru as an associate faculty. Since 2020, he has been an adjunct professor with the National Institute of Advanced Studies (NIAS). He is also an honorary consultant at the Centre of Excellence on Advanced Mechanics of Materials, Department of Civil Engineering, Indian Institute of Science, Bengaluru. He is also on the Director Board of Consortium for Sustainable Development Inc., Higganum, Connecticut, USA.

Rajendran is primarily responsible for introducing a relatively new research field of paleo-seismology in India. He is known for research in India's seismotectonics, earthquake geology, paleoseismology, archaeoseismology, and tsunami geology. His efforts have provided insights into the earthquake recurrence and fault zone deformation in various seismotectonic provinces of India.

Rajendran initiated paleoseismological work in various parts of the country including Killari (Latur), Kerala, Rann of Kachchh, Saurashtra, Cambay, Panvel (Maharashtra), Assam, Central Himalaya and Andaman-Nicobar region. His work before 2001 Gujarat earthquake on the 1819 Rann of Kutch earthquake and the linear elevated tract of land called "Allahbund" in the low-lying Rann in northwest India has led to basic understanding on earthquake processes in the northwestern part of India. His search in the epicentral area of the 1819 Rann of Kutch earthquake led to the identification of another event between 800 and 1,000 years B.P. Based on the relative size and frequency of 2001 and older sand blows, he interpreted that the earlier earthquake may have also originated from the same source.

Rajendran has also been working on the tsunami geology and hazard and worked in many globally important locations like the Chilean Coast and Makran Coast in Iran. He is also involved in the collaborative work and co-operation on tsunami hazard, among various researchers from many countries.

In 2005, Rajendran was ranked among the top ten young researchers in the country by the "Outlook" Magazine.

== Awards ==
He was awarded the National Geoscience Award in 2009 by the Government of India for his contributions to disaster management.
