= Jayakeralam =

Jayakeralam was a Malayalam–language weekly literary magazine published from Madras (now Chennai). It was established by C. R. Krishna Pillai in 1947 in order to encourage Malayalam writers both in Madras and Kerala, and to vocalise the "special needs" of the Malayali people. Jayakeralam was printed from Janatha Printing Press, also set up by Pillai in Madras. C. K. Appukutty Guptan was the editor of the magazine. Some of the most outstanding works of Malayalam literature were first published serially in this prestige periodical. Prominent writers such as P. Bhaskaran, Pavanan etc. had worked in the editorial board of Jayakeralam. It was one of the most popular literary magazines in Malayalam for three decades, but the publishers discontinued it in the 1990s.
