= C. P. Surendran =

Indian writer

Chittenippaattu Puthenveettil Surendran is an Indian poet, novelist, journalist, columnist and screenplay writer. He writes in English and is based out of New Delhi, India.

== Early life and education ==
Surendran was born on 9 June 1958 in Ottapalam, Kerala. His father, Pavanan (a.k.a. Puthanveettil Narayanan Nair) was a pioneering rationalist, a leftist Malayalam writer and an activist. His mother, Parvathy Pavanan (a.k.a. Chittenippaattu Puthenveettil Parvathy Amma), is an acclaimed author and a winner of the Kerala Sahitya Academy Award. After schooling in Thiruvananthapuram and Chennai, Surendran graduated from a college in Thrissur, and went on to receive his Master's in English Literature from Delhi University, New Delhi.

== Career in journalism ==
Surendran had a brief stint as a teacher of English Literature at Calicut University in Kerala before moving to Mumbai in 1986 to work as a journalist, in the footsteps of his maternal uncle, the late C.P. Ramachandran.

Surendran began his career in print media as a journalist with leading English newspapers including The Times of India, Times Sunday Review and Bombay Times. He was a resident editor of The Times of India in Pune for three years from 2003 to 2006. He was the editor of Open Magazine in New Delhi from 2009 to 2012. He went on to serve as the senior editor with The Times of India in Delhi and later, as chief editor of Daily News and Analysis (a.k.a. DNA). He is currently a contributing editor, columnist and media consultant with Khaleej Times. He is a columnist for Indian and international papers like The Hindu, The Hindustan Times, Outlook, Khaleej Times, and Gulf News.

== Poetry ==
Surendran's poems have been internationally anthologized, and he has received recognition for writing and journalism including Reuters International Fellowship at Oxford, Wolfson Press Fellowship at Cambridge and British Council Literature Fellowship at Cambridge. A selection of his poems was included in Gemini II (1994). His first independent collection was "Posthumous Poems." His other volumes of poetry include "Canaries on the Moon" (2002), "Portraits of the Space We Occupy" (2007) and "Available Light: New and Collected Poems"(2017)

"Available Light" is a collection of 360 poems written over 25 years and includes new poems appended with those from his previous 4 volumes in poetry.

Stark and often caustic, his poems reflect his preoccupation with love, death and loneliness.

                          Home, I tell the man turning away in the mirror,
                          My captive. Let him go?
                          Cut my wrist and set off a little sunset.
                          Let him go.

== Fiction ==
His books of fiction include "An Iron Harvest" (2006), "Lost and Found" (2010) and "Hadal" (2015). His novel "One Love and the Many Lives of Osip B", was released in July 2021.

== Screenplay ==
Surendran is also a screenplay writer, having written scripts for Gour Hari Dastaan, which was released in 2014 and "Mai Ghat" (2019) which was screened online at the 73rd Festival de Cannes.

== Bibliography ==
Novels

- An Iron Harvest (Indiaink)
- Lost And Found ( HarperCollins, 2010)
- Hadal (HarperCollins 2015)
- One Love and the Many Lives of Osip B (Niyogi Books)

Poetry

- Gemini II (Penguin Viking)
- Posthumous Poems (Penguin Viking)
- Canaries On The Moon (Yeti Press)
- Portraits Of The Space We Occupy (HarperCollins)
- Available Light: New and Collected Poems (HarperCollins)

Screenplay

- Gour Hari Dastaan (2014)
- Mai Ghat (2019)
