= Sahodaran Ayyappan =

Indian social reformer and activist

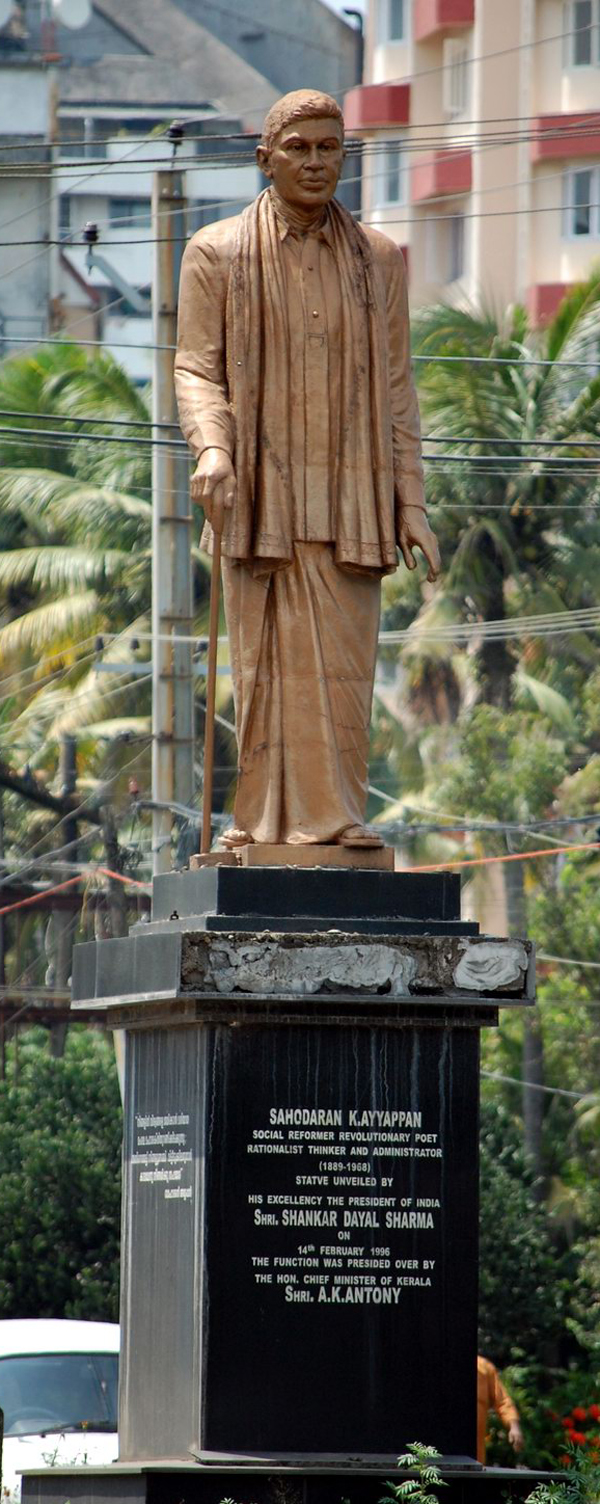
- സഹോദരൻ അയ്യപ്പൻ
- Born: 21 August 1889; Cherai, Kochi, Kerala, India
- Died: 6 March 1968 (aged 78); Kerala, India
- Other name: Ayyappan master
- Occupations: Social reformer; thinker; journalist; politician
- Spouse: Parvathy
- Children: 2
- Parents: Kochavu Vaidyan; Unnooli

Kumbalathuparambu Ayyappan (21 August 1889 – 6 March 1968), better identified as Sahodaran Ayyappan, was a social reformer, thinker, rationalist, journalist, and politician from Kerala, India. As a vocal follower of Sree Narayana Guru, he was associated with a number of events related to the Kerala reformation movement and was the organizer of Misra Bhojanam in Cherai in 1917. He founded Sahodara Sangam, and the journal Sahodaran and was the founder editor of the magazine Yukthivadi.

== Biography ==
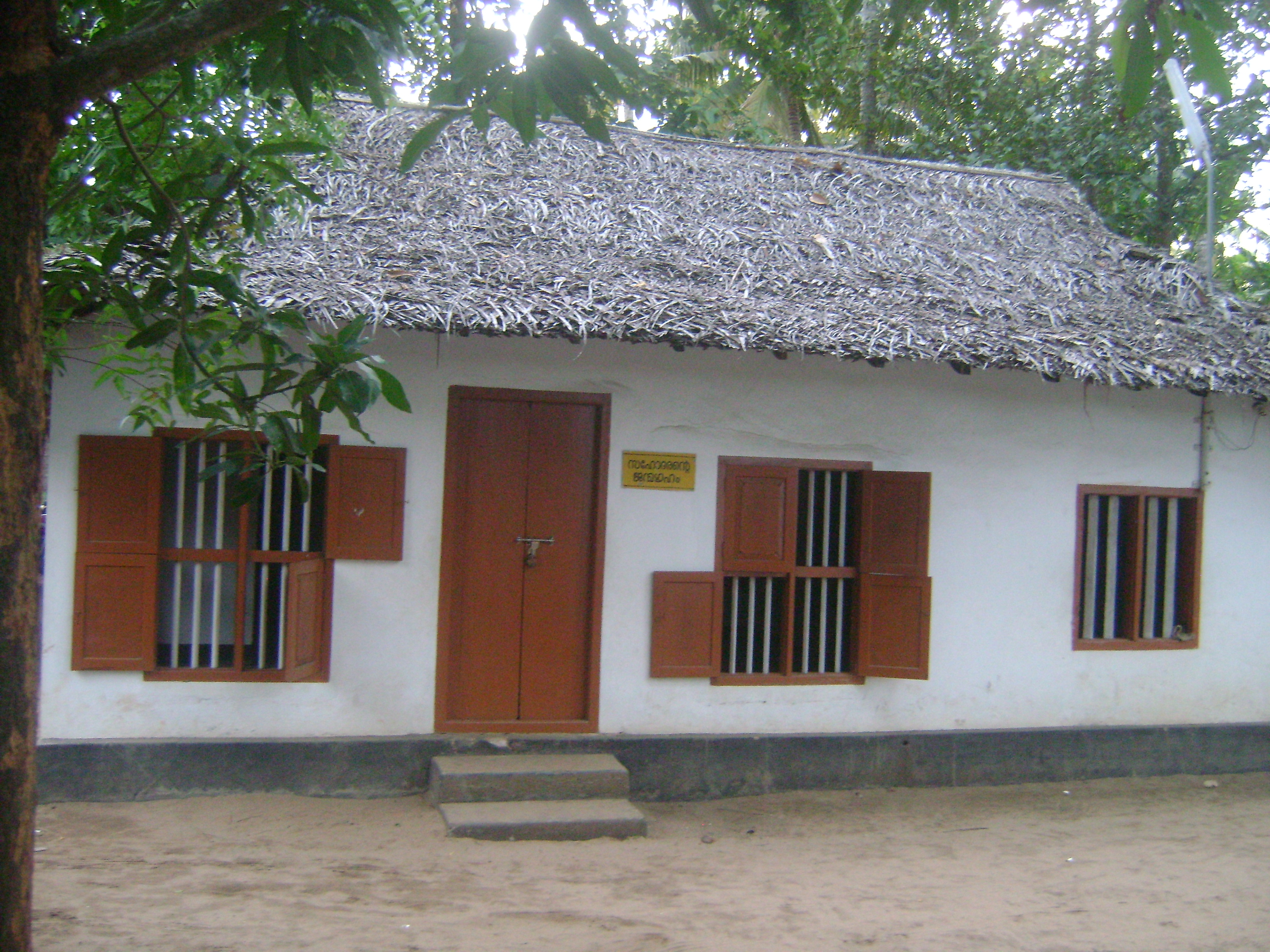
Sahodaran Ayyapan's home at Cherai

K. Ayyappan was born on 21 August 1889, in Cherai, Vypin Island, in Ernakulam district of the present day south Indian state of Kerala in an aristocratic Ezhava family of ayurvedic physicians to Kumabalathuparambil Kochavu Vaidyar and Unnooli, as the youngest of their nine children. Due to matrilineal inheritance, he is not related more to father and His father died when he was a child and was brought up under the guidance of his elder brother, Achuthan Vaidyar. His early education was in the traditional way and he learnt from local teachers such as Mattapilla Kannu Asan and Kochupilla Asan after which he started the formal education at a local school started by Nediyara Achan Bava. Subsequently, he studied at schools in Pallippuram and North Paravur before passing the pre-degree course from Malabar Christian College to join Maharaja's College, Thiruvananthapuram, the present-day University College for his under graduate studies. In between, there was a short break in studies due to health issues. During this period, he had the opportunity to interact with Narayana Guru and it was Guru who arranged for Ayyappan's stay in Thiruvananthapuram with the noted poet, Kumaran Asan. After completing his graduate studies in 1916, he returned to his native place to start his career started as a teacher at Rama Varma Union High School, Cherai but he could not carry his social and political life along with the teaching career and he quit the job. Later, he studied law but that was a futile attempt as he failed in the FL examination.

Ayyappan was married to Parvathy and the couple had a daughter, Aisha and a son, Sugathan. He died on 6 March 1968, at the age of 78, following a cardiac arrest.

== Reform movements ==
After his graduation, he returned to Cherai from Thiruvananthapuram in 1917 and founded Sahodara Sangham (The Brotherhood Association), a platform to launch his fight against the caste system. Under the aegis of this organization, he organized a Misra Bhojanan, a feast where people of all castes sat and dined under one roof, at the house of Ayyappan's nephew, Raman Pillai, on 30 May 1917, a revolutionary venture during those days and the conservative Ezhava community opposed it. Around 200 people including members representing the Pulaya caste, who were considered untouchable attended the feast and the effort earned him the moniker, Pulaya Ayyappan, meant to be derogatory but Ayyappan accepted it as a decoration. The founding of the Sahodara Sangham also earned him another epithet, Sahodaran Ayyappan, with which he came to be known thereafter.

Narayana Guru supported the efforts of Sahodara Sangham through a message sent on 15 May 1921, and in order to propagate his ideals, Ayyappan started a journal, Sahodaran, from Mattancherry; the journal continued to be in print until 1956. IN 1929, when M. Ramavarma Thampan, Mithavaadi Krishnan, C. V. Kunhiraman, and M. C. Joseph started the Yukthivadi (The Rationalist), he became the founder editor of the magazine. He modified the famous slogan of Narayana Guru, Oru Jaathi Oru Matham Oru Daivam Manushyanu (One Caste, One Religion, One God for Mankind) as Jati Venda, Matam Venda, Deivam Venda Manushyanu (No Caste, No Religion, No God for Mankind). 'Vidya Poshini Sabha' was an organization founded by Sahodaran Ayyappan to promote education and combat caste discrimination in Kerala. It was part of the broader social reform movement in the region, aimed at empowering marginalized communities through education and social reform.

== Political career ==
In 1928, Ayyappan successfully contested the election to the Cochin Legislative Council and he retained the seat for the next 21 years. He became a minister in the Cochin Legislative assembly in 1947 and when the state of Travancore and Kochi was united to form Travancore-Cochin state, he continued to serve as a minister, only to resign from the post when the government started dismissing lower level employees as an austerity measure. However, in the next elections in October 1949, the Prajamandalam Party secured majority to form a ministry under the leadership of E. Ikkanda Warrier, he joined the ministry along with Panampilli Govinda Menon and C. A. Ouseph. He also served as a minister under Paravoor T. K. Narayana Pillai but resigned the post when the ministerial responsibilities interfered with his social life.

== Literary career ==
Ayyappan published six books of poetry and an essay compilation, "Sadhesheeyam". Besides, he also wrote several articles and editorials which appeared in the publications he was associated with.

== Memorials and honours ==
On 14 February 1996, Shankar Dayal Sharma, the then president of India, unveiled a statue of Ayyappan in Kochi. The Government of Kerala has set up Sahodaran Ayyappan Memorial at the house where Ayyappan was born which houses Sahodaran Ayyappan Smaraka Library and the Sahodaran Ayyappan museum. Three educational institutions in Kerala bear the name of Ayyappan, viz. Sahodaran Ayyappan Smaraka (SNDP) Yogam College, Konni, Pathanamthitta district, Sahodaran Memorial High School, Cherai, and the Sahodaran Ayyappan Memorial College of Education, Poothotta. One of the main arterial roads in Kochi has been named after him as Sahodaran Ayyappan Road. An annual award, the Sahodaran Media Award, has been instituted to recognize excellence in journalism.

== Popular media ==
- A documentary film about Sahodaran Ayyappan, part of a series of films on prominent Malayalis, was narrated by M. K. Sanu, who also wrote a biography of him.

== Gallery ==
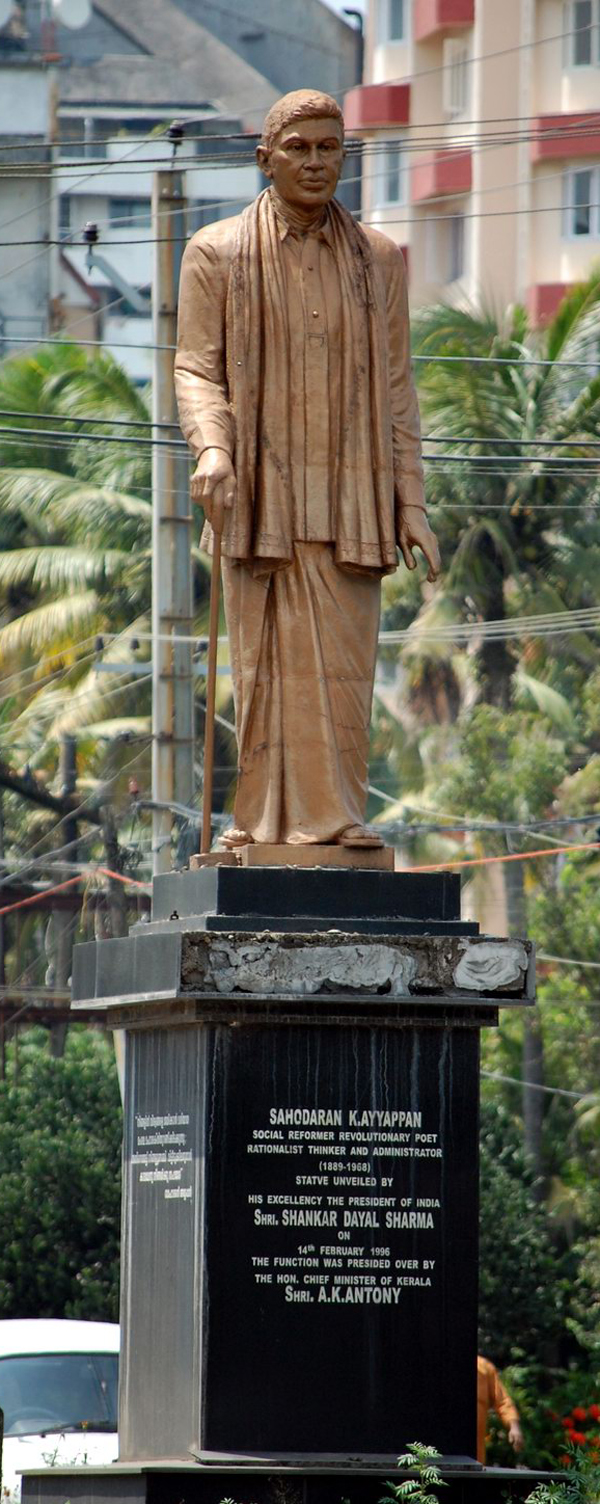
Statue of Ayyappan in Kochi

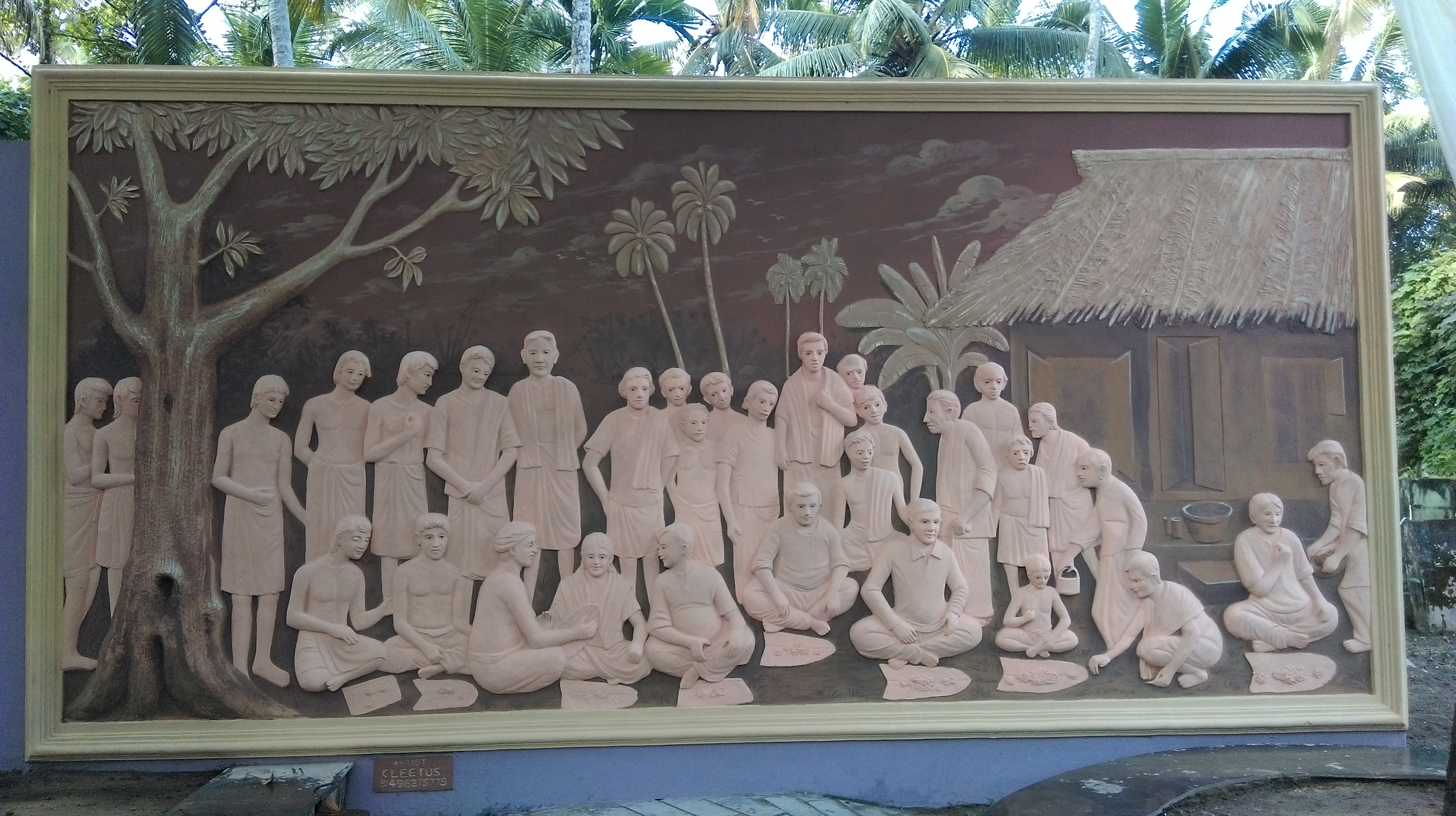
Mural depicting Mishra Bhojanam

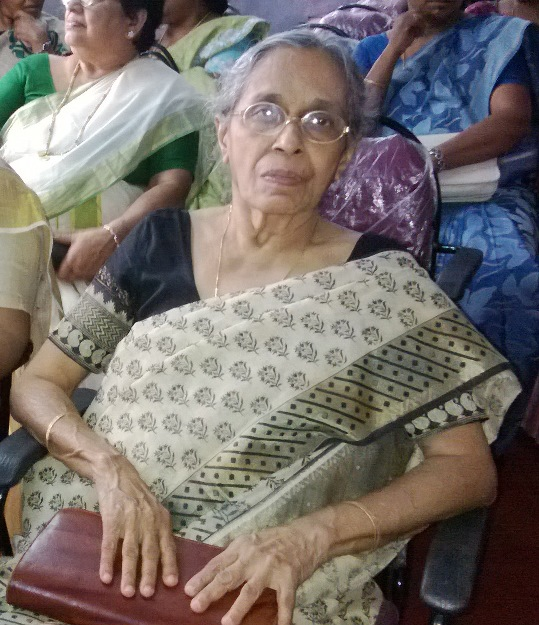
Aisha Gopalakrishnan, Ayyappan's daughter

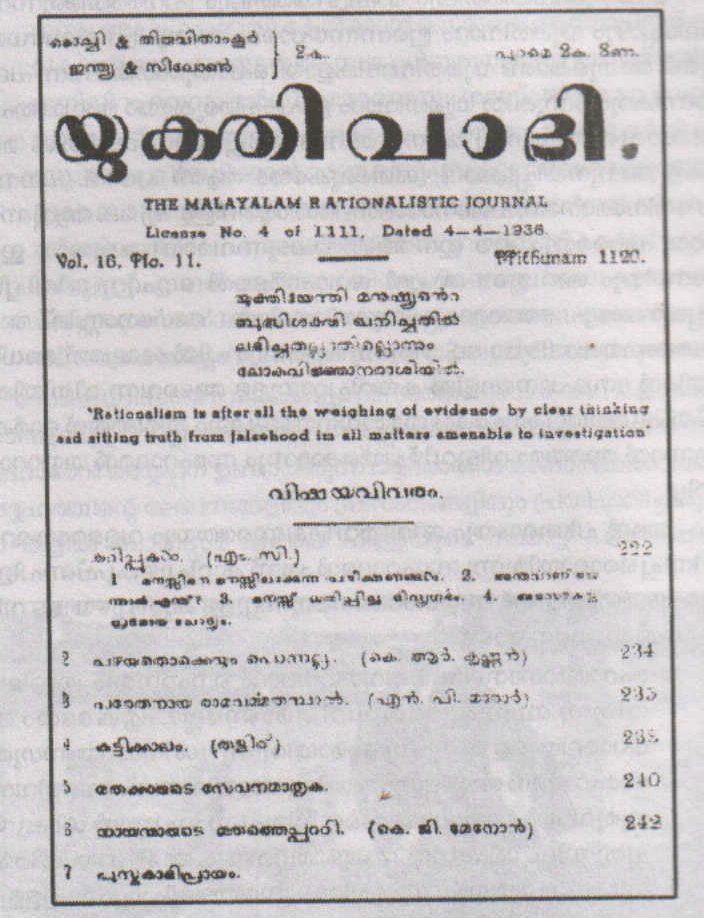
Issue of Yukthivadi magazine dated April 4, 1936

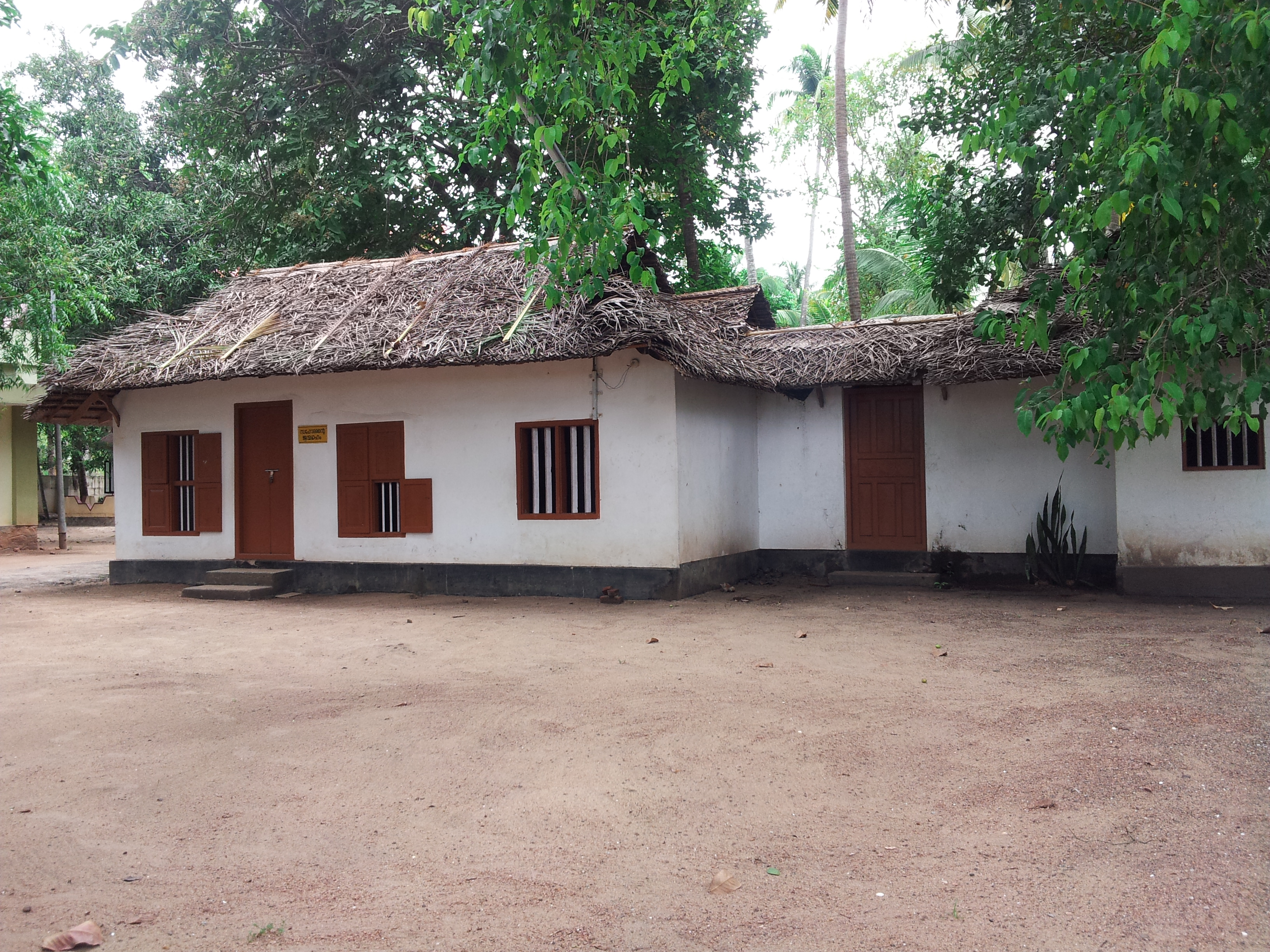
Birthplace

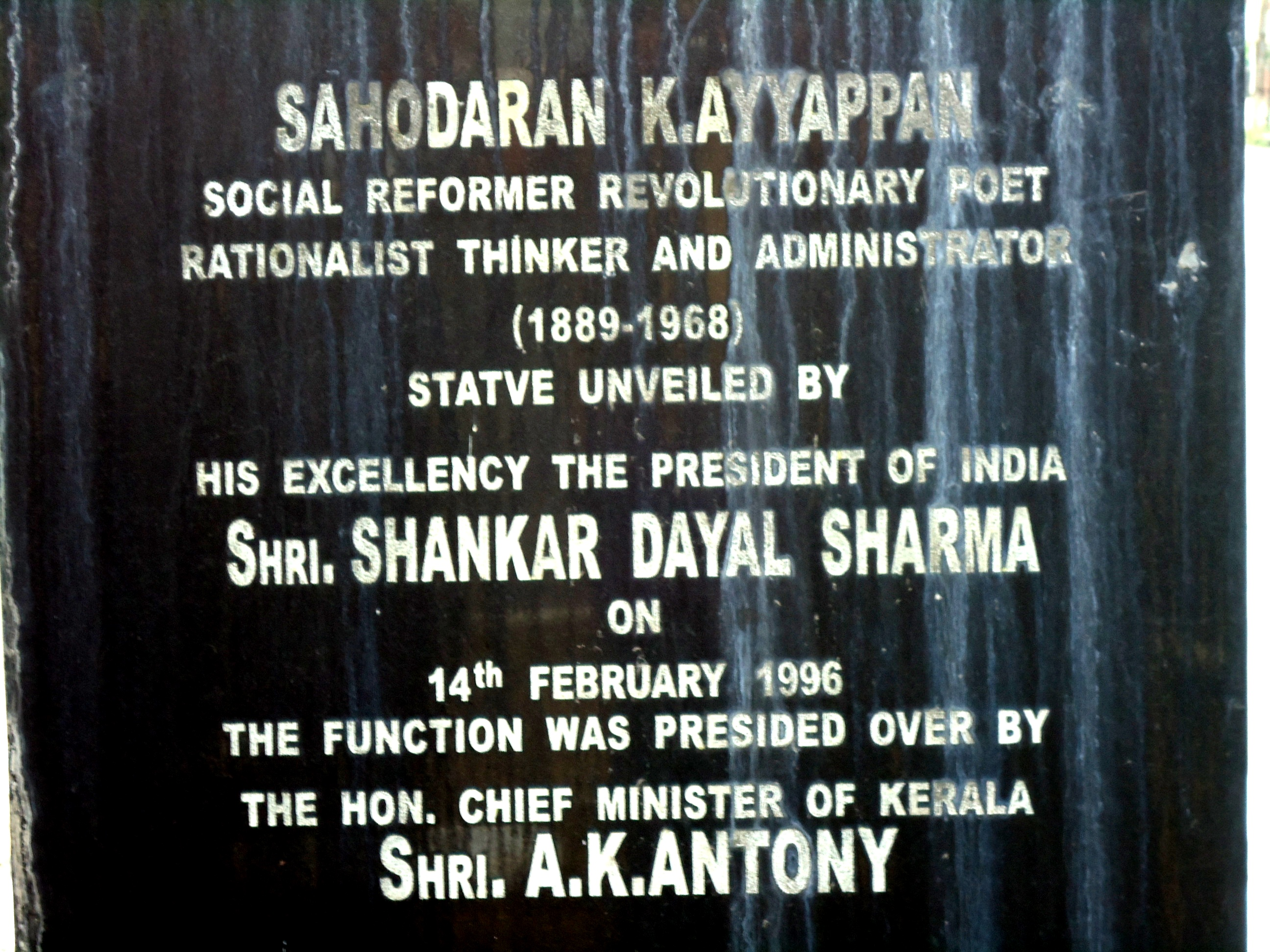
Statue stone

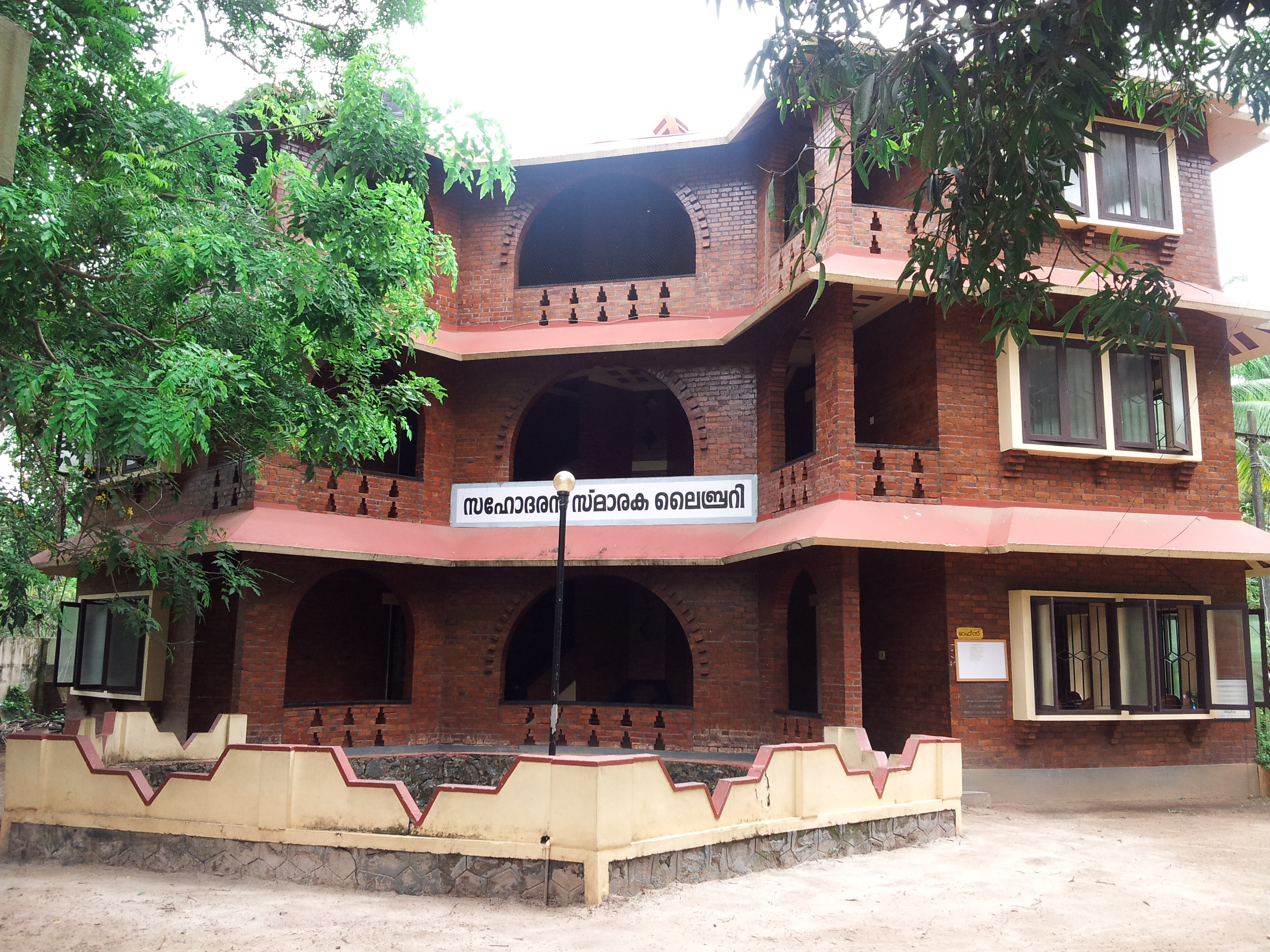
Sahodaran Ayyappan Smaraka Library

== See also ==
- List of Malayalam-language authors by category
- List of Malayalam-language authors
- Kerala Yukthivadi Sangham

== See Also (Social reformers of Kerala) ==
- Sree Narayana Guru
- Dr. Palpu
- Kumaranasan
- Rao Sahib Dr. Ayyathan Gopalan
- Brahmananda Swami Sivayogi
- Vaghbhatananda
- Mithavaadi Krishnan
- Moorkoth Kumaran
- Ayyankali
- Ayya Vaikundar
- Pandit Karuppan
