= Cherai Gowreeshwara Temple =

Hindu temple in Kerala, India

- Gowreeshwara Temple, Cherai, Vypin, Ernakulam, Kerala

Religion
- Affiliation: Hinduism
- District: Ernakulam
- Deity: Murugan

Location
- Location: Cherai, Vypin
- State: Kerala
- Country: India
- Interactive map of Cherai Gowreeshwara Temple
- Coordinates: 10.132791°N 76.195319°E

Architecture
- Type: Architecture of Kerala

Specifications
- Temple: One
- Elevation: 23.92 m (78 ft)

The Cherai Gowreeshwara Temple is a Hindu temple in the village of Cherai on Vypeen island in the state of Kerala in South India.

== Location ==
This temple is located at an altitude of about 23.92 metres (78.5 ft) above the mean sea level with the geographic coordinates of (10.132791°N 76.195319°E) in Vypin.

== See also ==
- Temples of Kerala
