= Kusala Rajendran =

Indian seismologist

- കുസലാ രാജെന്ദ്രൻ
- Citizenship: Indian
- Education: University of South Carolina, USA IIT, Roorkee
- Spouse: C. P. Rajendran
- Scientific career
- Fields: Seismotectonics, paleoseismology, active tectonics
- Workplaces: Indian Institute of Science, Bengaluru
- Website: http://ceas.iisc.ernet.in/~kusala/

Kusala Rajendran is an Indian seismologist and currently a professor at the Centre for Earth Sciences, Indian Institute of Science, Bengaluru, India. She prefers to call herself an earth scientist. She has primarily worked on earthquakes and their source mechanisms. She has worked extensively on earthquake patterns in India and is considered to be one of the pioneers in this field.

== Research fields ==
Rajendran has been working in the following areas:

- Seismotectonics, Crustal Processes
- Role of Water in Faulting Process
- Paleoseismology, earthquake recurrence and active tectonics
- Tsunami recurrence and hazard evaluation

== Education and career ==
Rajendran has completed her Master of Technology in the field of Applied Geophysics from the Indian Institute of Technology, Roorkee in 1979. She graduated from University of South Carolina, USA with a Doctor of Philosophy in Seismology in the year 1992. Owing to the growing demand for well qualified seismologists at the time, she returned to India after completing her PhD. Additionally, as her son had become old enough then, she could travel around the world studying earthquakes with greater ease . She has worked extensively in Gujarat, Maharasthra and the Himalayas. She believes that India is a great potential earth science destination, considering that the Himalayas constitute of one of the most active plate collision boundary in the world. She has published around forty research papers in collaboration with her husband C.P. Rajendran, a reputed Indian geologist, over the years. She has led several projects as the principal investigator. Most of her projects are funded by the seismicity program of the Ministry of Earth Sciences (MoES) or the Indian National Centre for Ocean Information Services (INCOIS).

Rajendran has been a professor at the Center for Earth Sciences, IISc Bengaluru, India since 2007. She develops her own teaching philosophy and methodology as there are hardly any prescribed textbooks in Geophysics for undergraduates. She also work on earthquake recurrence, tsunami recurrence and hazard evaluations. Her work combines field observations and models developed in the lab. For field visits, she usually travels in groups to earthquake prone areas and places that have recently experienced an earthquake.

== Family and personal life ==
Rajendran grew up in a conservative family where the children were usually married off after a bachelor's degree. The only reason the young Kusala, fresh out of her chemistry degree, was sent all the way from Trivandrum, Kerala, to Roorkee, then-Uttar Pradesh, was that her sister was working there. Though she was sent there to do her master's degree in chemistry, a chance encounter with a professor at the IIT-Roorkee campus led Kusala to the field of science that she would come to master over the next thirty years, geophysics. Kusala is married to the Indian geologist C.P. Rajendran. Her son Rahul Pavanan is married to the Tamil actress Abhirami.

== Awards ==
- In 1993 she was awarded the Krishnan Gold Medal by the Indian Geophysical Union for her geophysics work.
- She received the Tabor award in 1992 from the Department of Geological Sciences, University of South Carolina.
- In 2019, she became a laureate of the Asian Scientist 100 by the Asian Scientist.
- Ranked as one of the top ten young researchers in the country by the "Outlook" Magazine (18 July 2005)
