= Cherai Beach =

Beach in Kerala, India

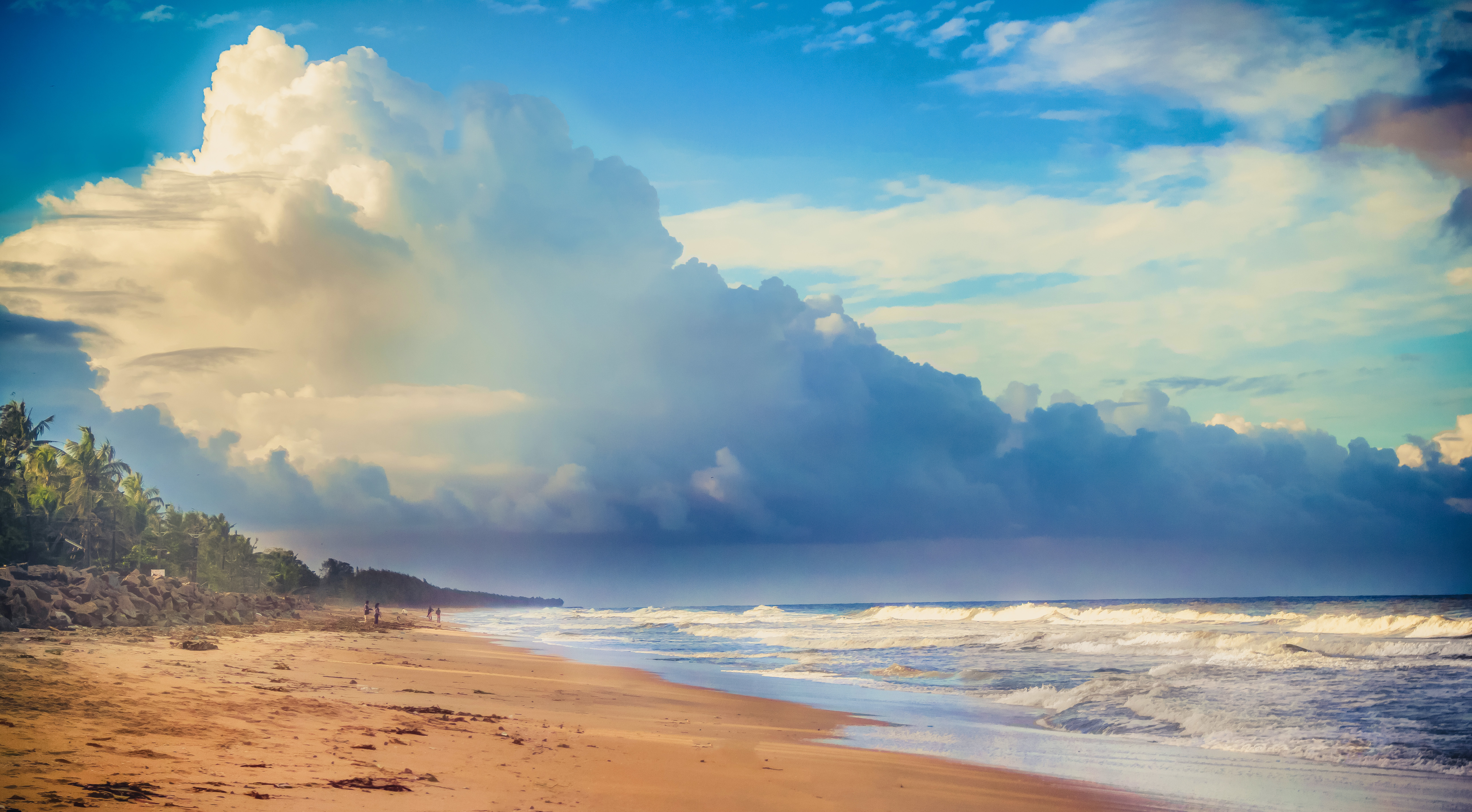
- Sunrise at Cherai Beach

- Location in Kerala, India
- Coordinates: 10.14227°N 76.178255°E
- Country: India
- State: Kerala
- District: Ernakulam
- Named for: Cherai, Vypin
- Time zone: UTC+5:30 (IST)
- Nearest city: Kochi

Cherai Beach is located in Cherai on the northern side of Vypin Island, a suburb of the city of Kochi in the state of Kerala, India. One of the most visited beaches in the state, it is situated around 25 km (15 mi) from downtown Kochi and 20 km (12 mi) from Cochin International Airport.

== Tourism ==
The beach is around 10 km long and is ideal for swimming as the tide is mostly low and the waves are gentle. It is known for frequent dolphin sightings. It is one of the few places where the backwaters and the sea can be seen in a single frame. Cherai Beach offers a less busy and cleaner option accessible from Kochi and always attracts tourists from all over the world.

== Images of Cherai beach ==
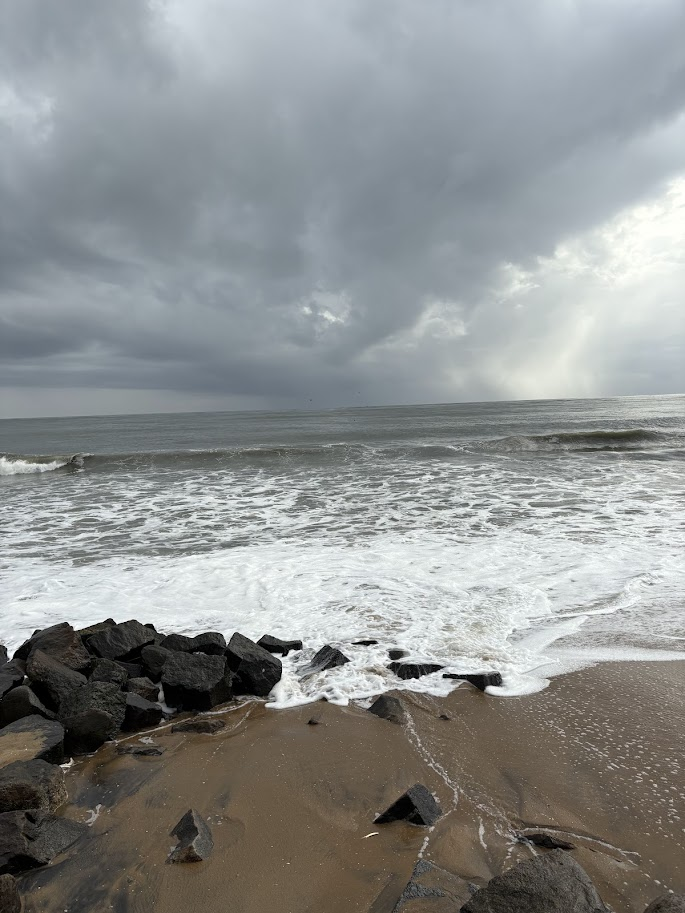
Whitewater as seen at the beach

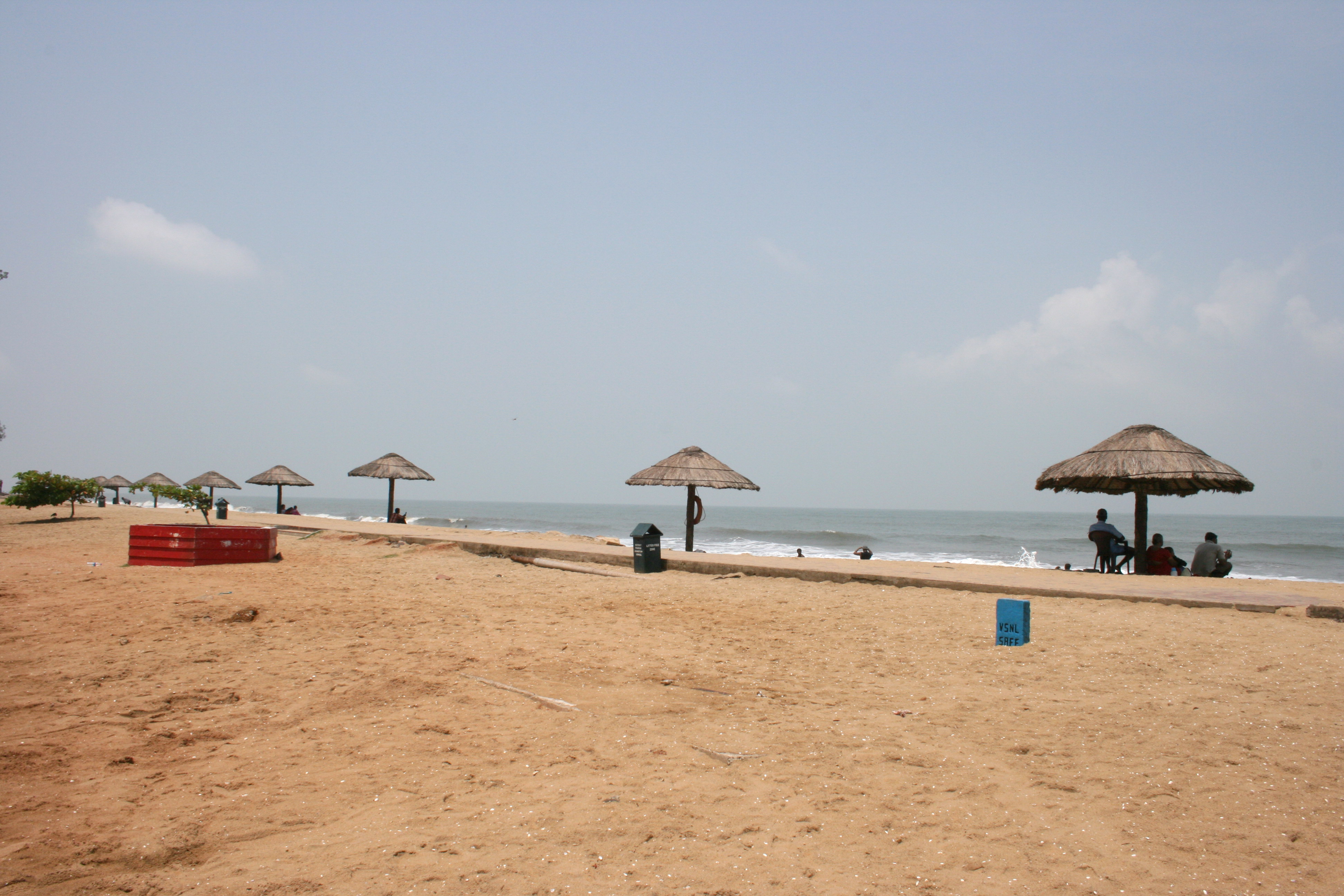
View of Cherai Beach

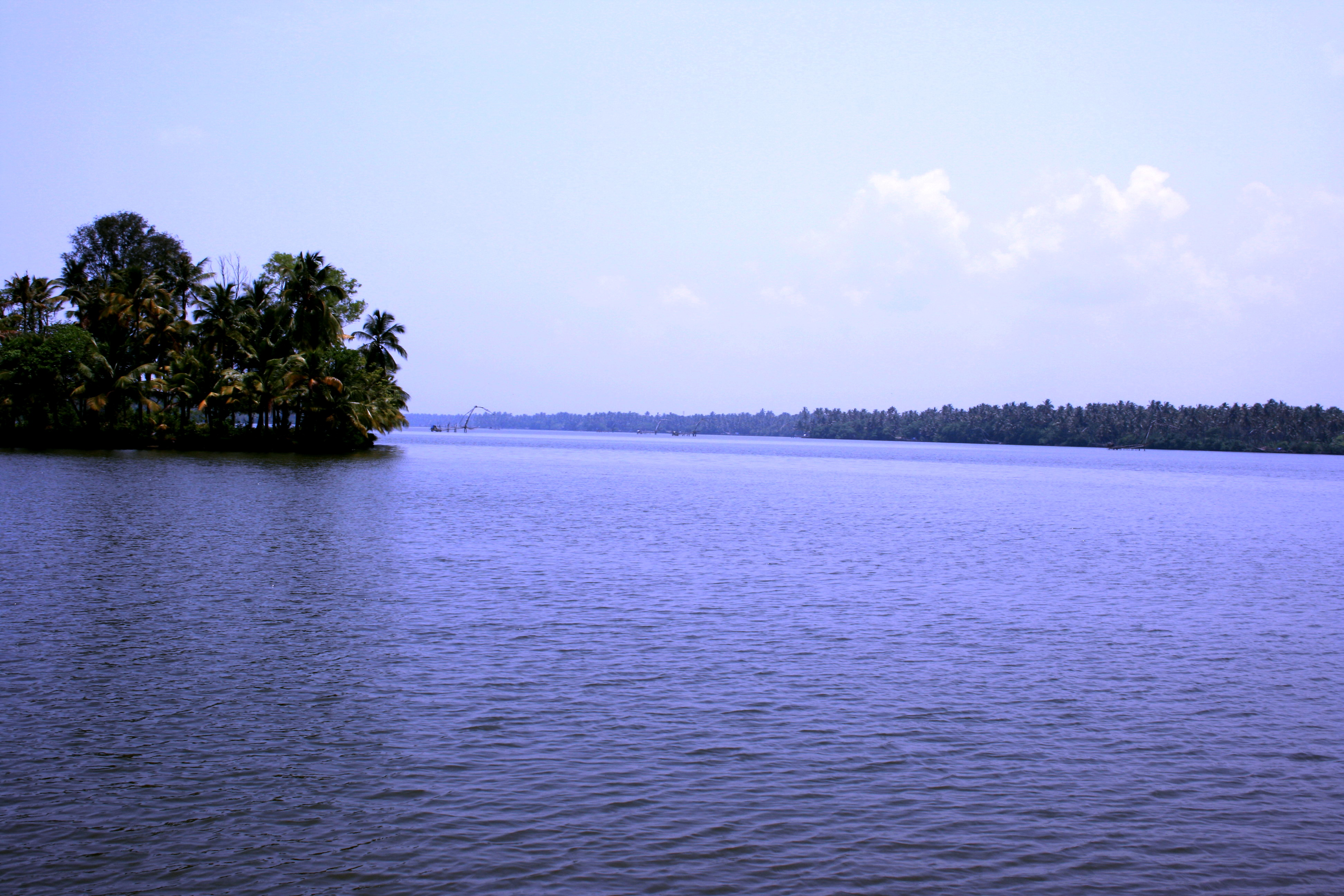
View of Cherai Lagoon

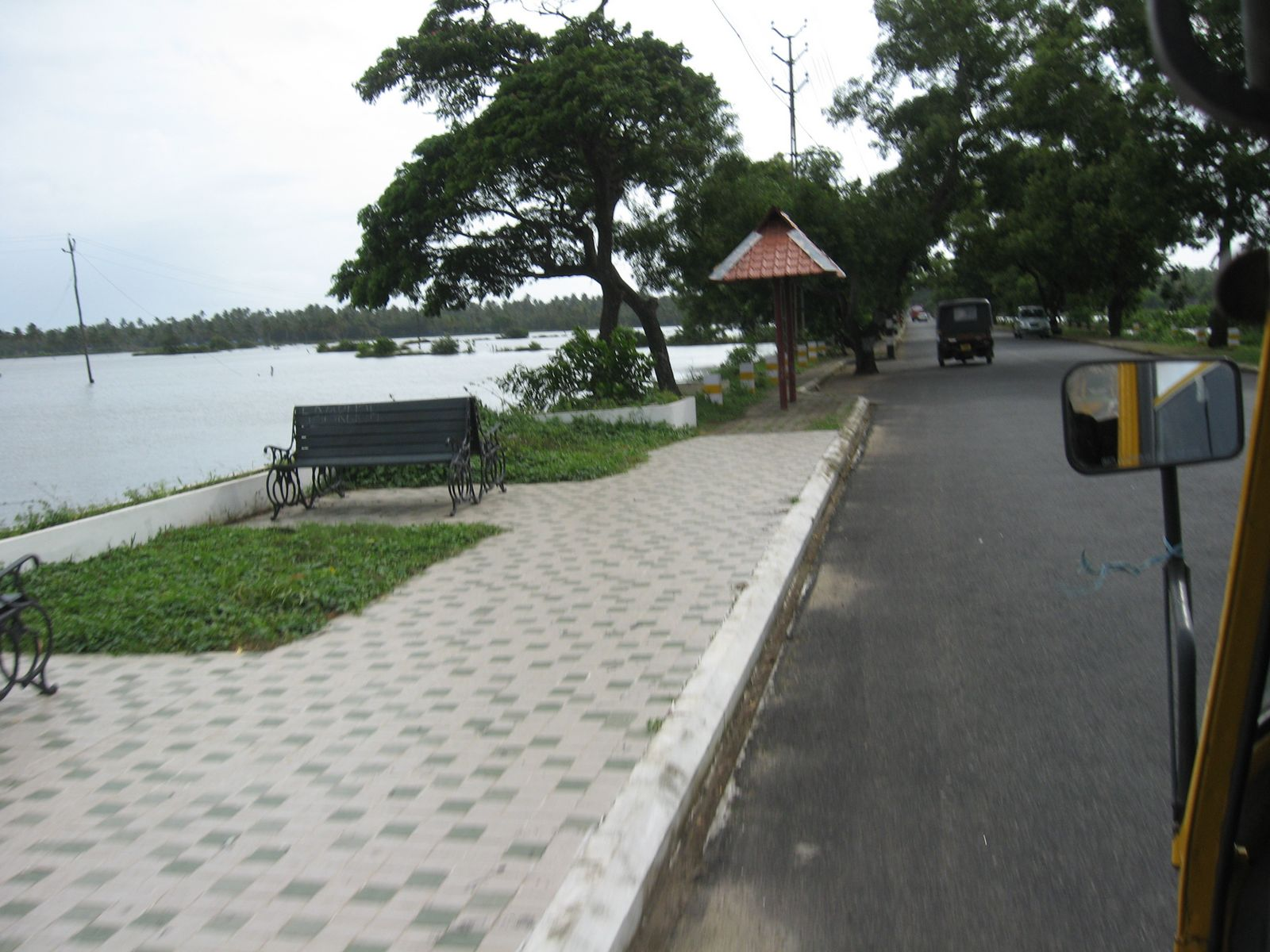
One of the walkways near the beach

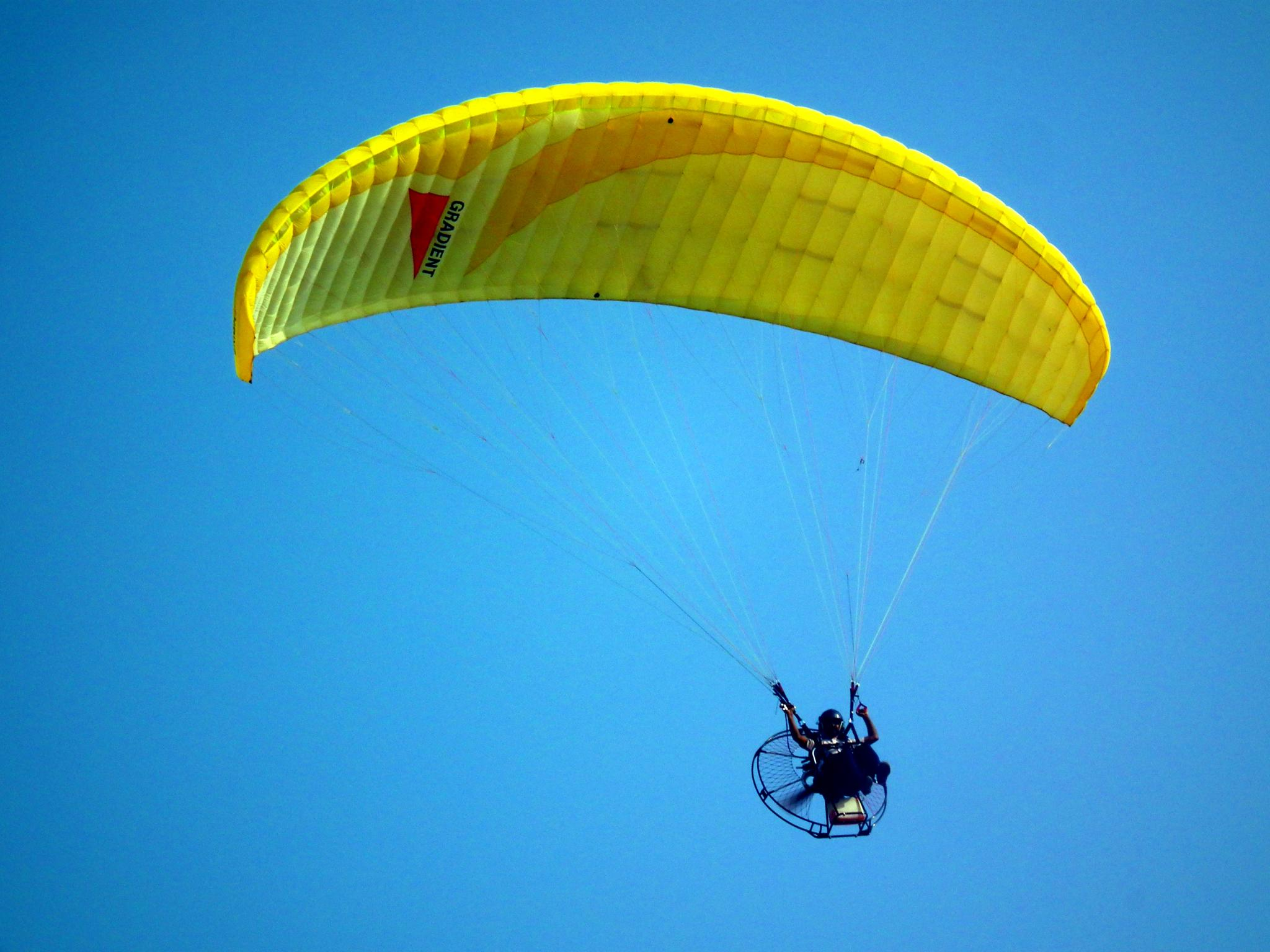
Paragliding at the beach

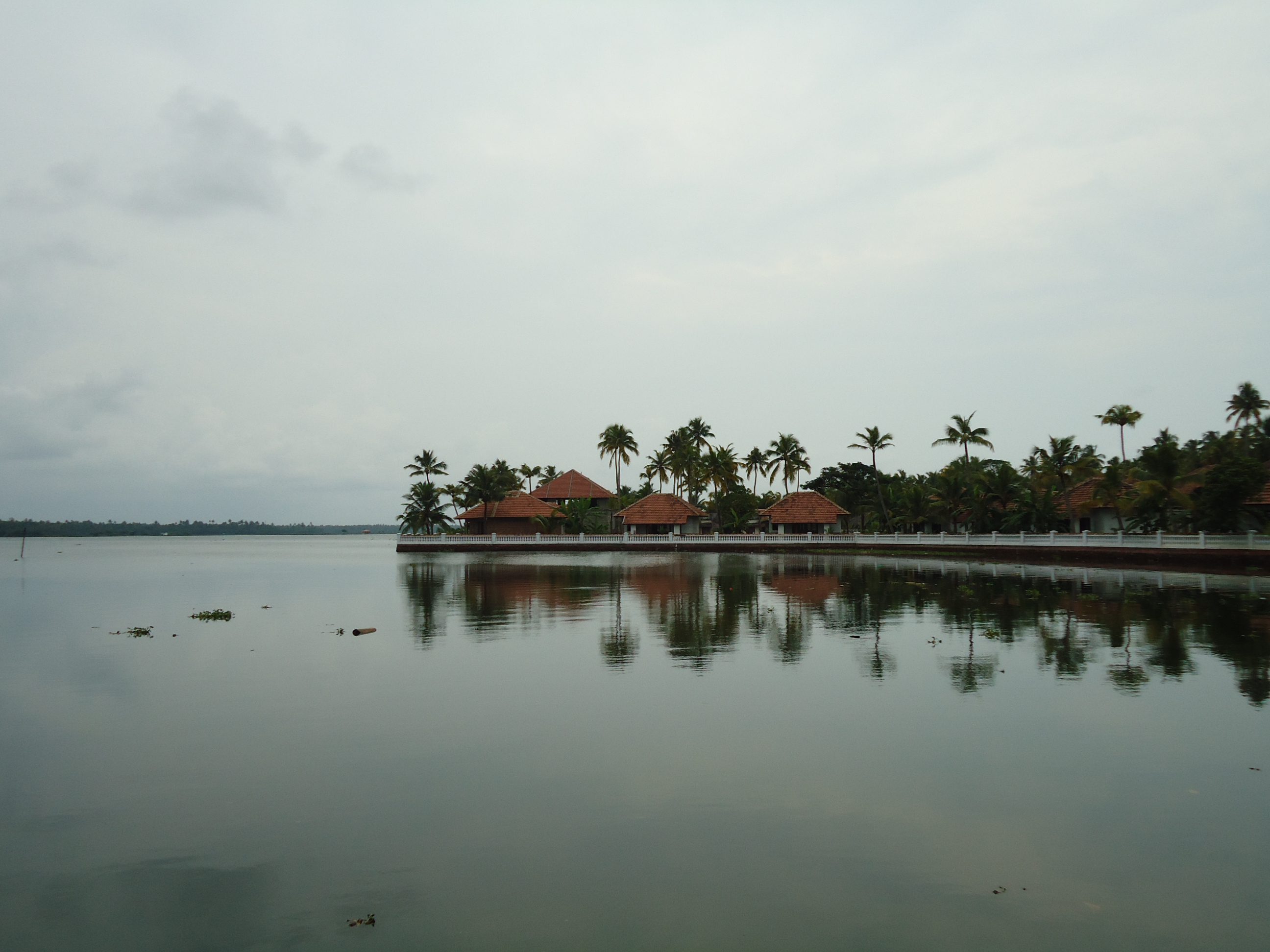
One of the resorts near the beach

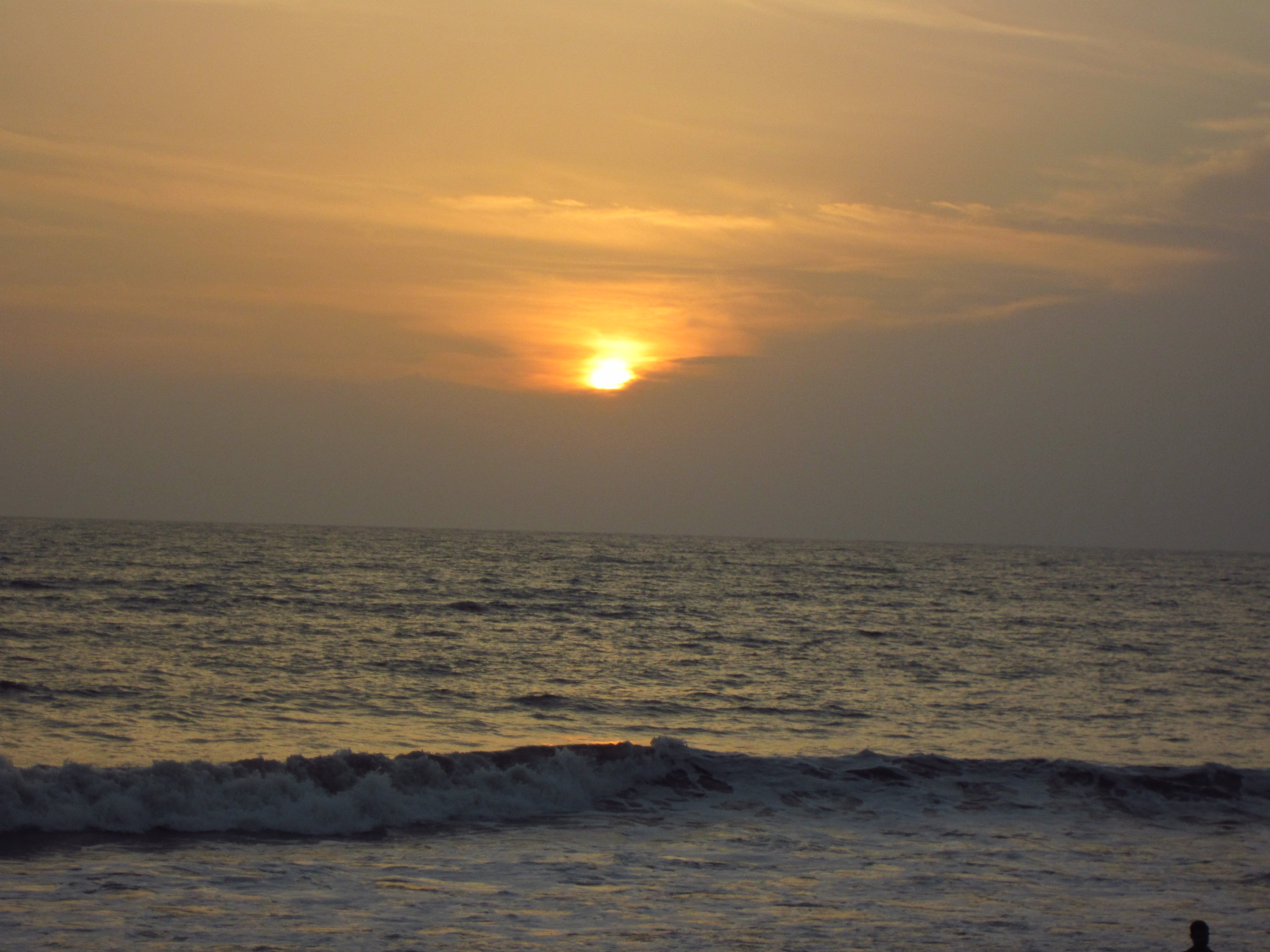
Sunset at Cherai beach
