= Yukthivadi =

Rationalist/atheist journal published in Malayalam

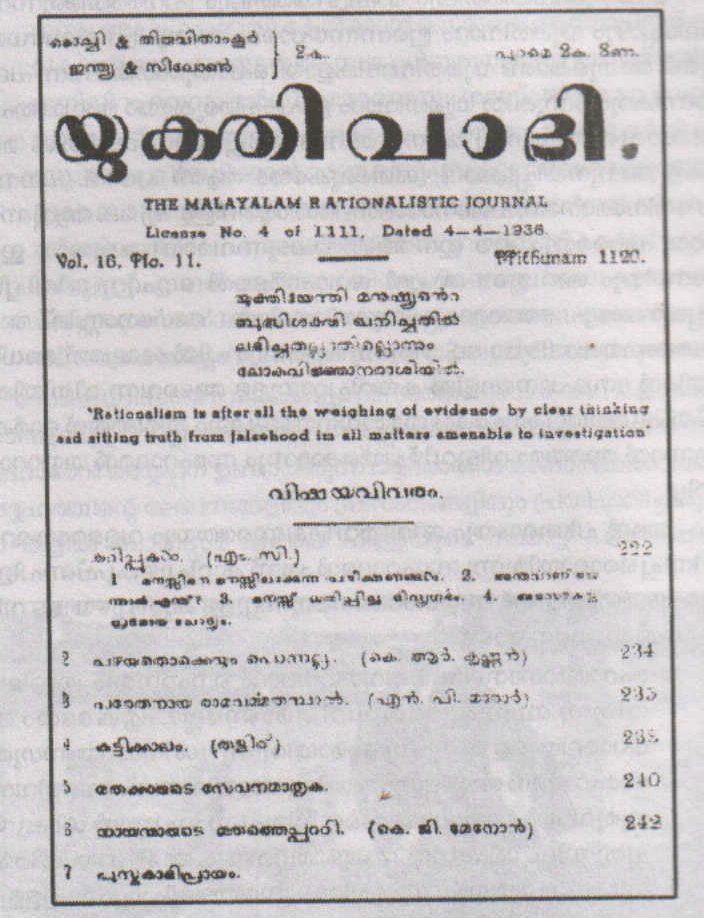
Issue of Yukthivadi dated 4 April 1936

Yukthivadi (The Rationalist) was the first rationalist and atheist journal published in Malayalam. The journal played an early role in the development of organized rationalist thought in Kerala, India. Its launch is commonly associated with the emergence of organized rationalism in the state, which later formed part of Kerala’s wider social reform movements.

== History and profile ==
Yukthivadi started its publication in August 1929 from Ernakulam under the editorial board of M. Ramavarma Thampan, C. Krishnan, C. V. Kunhiraman, Sahodaran Ayyappan and M.C. Joseph. In a statement published in the first issue of Yukthivadi, Sahodaran K. Ayyappan wrote:

Rationalism is not a religion; it is an attitude of accepting knowledge based on reason. Yukthivadi attempts to foster this mindset among the public. To achieve this, we must critique irrational beliefs and promote rational thought. Because Yukthivadi does not claim to hold ultimate truth, it continuously updates its stance as new information emerges. Every rationalist is bound to do the same. The sole unchangeable maxim that Yukthivadi accepts is that knowledge must be rooted in reason..

Despite the fact that all the members of editorial board were well known social activists, the conservative Kerala welcomed its publication with expected derision. Prominent figures including Moorkoth Kumaran did not hesitate to pen a poem denigrating the publishers. Not surprisingly, a meeting of a religious sect passed a resolution cursing the publishers of Yukthivadi!

In August 1931 M.C.Joseph became its sole editor-publisher and shifted the publication to Irinjalakkuda. For the next forty five years until June 1974 M.C.Joseph brought out the magazine without any interruption. In July 1974, because of his failing health (he was 87 then), he handed over the magazine to Unni Kakkanad, who published it for yet another decade before it ceased publication.^{1}

The vibrant rationalist movement that is seen in Kerala today is undoubtedly the direct consequence of the ideas spread by Yukthivadi for more than half a century.

== See also ==
- Mithavaadi
- Sahodaran

== Notes ==
1. An attempt was made in the 1990s by the late C.G.Jayashankar, a Trissur based rationalist activist, to revive the magazine. But it was wound up after bringing out a few issues.
