= M. C. Joseph =

Indian rationalist (1887–1981)

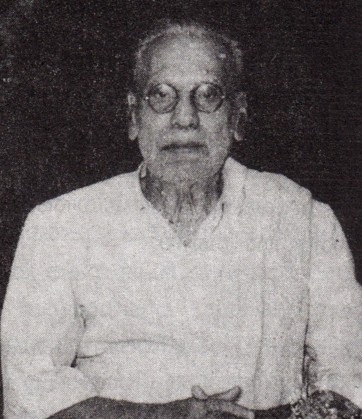
- Born: Mookencheril Cherian Joseph; 6 January 1887; Thrippunithura, Kerala, India
- Died: 26 October 1981 (aged 94)
- Occupations: Atheist, author, publisher, activist

Mookencheril Cherian Joseph, popularly known as Yukthivadi M. C. Joseph, was an eminent rationalist from Kerala, India. He was also one of the significant leaders of Kerala reformation movement.

== Biography ==
Joseph was born on 6 January 1887 at Thripunithura in Kerala. His father was Cherian "Kuncheria" of the Mookencheril house and his mother's name was Maria. After his education, he took up his career as a lawyer. He was one of the founders of Yukthivadi (meaning the Rationalist in English), the first ever rationalist / atheist magazine in Malayalam along with Ramavarma Thampan, C. Krishnan, C. V. Kunhiraman and Sahodaran Ayyappan. The first issue of the Yukthivadi was brought out in August, 1929. Sahodaran Ayyappan was the first editor of the magazine. Two years later M. C. Joseph took over the editorship and successfully continued its publication without a single gap in the issues for the next 45 years, single-handedly. His famous column Kurippukal (Notes) carried scathing criticism of all organized religions, superstitions, and undemocratic and authoritarian political systems. During his tenure as its editor, the magazine got so identified with its editor that he came to be known as Yukthivadi M. C. Joseph, meaning M. C. Joseph the rationalist. In July 1974, at the age of 87, he handed over the magazine job to Unni Kakkanand, a few months before he died on 26 October 1981.

Joseph died on 26 October 1981 at the age of 94. As per his wishes, the body was handed over to Calicut Medical College.

Bharathiya yukthivadi Sangham, a rationalist organisation founded by Sreeni Pattathanam is giving the M. C. Joseph Award in memory of him to distinguished secular writers and activists in Malayalam. Kureepuzha Sreekumar, Pavanan, Malayalam writer Zacharia, Thilakan, Vaisakhan, M K Sanu, Anand are the winners of this award. Former Chief Minister of Kerala, Pinarayi Vijayan had handed over the M. C. Joseph award to M K Sanu on 20 August 2017. During his speech at the event Pinarayi Vijayan said M. C. Joseph had the capability to provide logical answers and establish his point of view on questions related to rationalism. “He was one of those who fearlessly fought superstitions and ill- practices of his time. Such bravado energises posterity also," the Chief Minister opined.

== Yukthivadi Journal ==
Yukthivadi (The Rationalist) was the first atheist journal published in Malayalam. It was first published in August 1929, under an editorial board of which Joseph was a member. It is associated with the emergence of rationalism and social reform movements in Kerala.

In August 1931, Joseph became its sole publisher, continuing until June 1974 when he passed the magazine to Unni Kakkand due to his failing health,

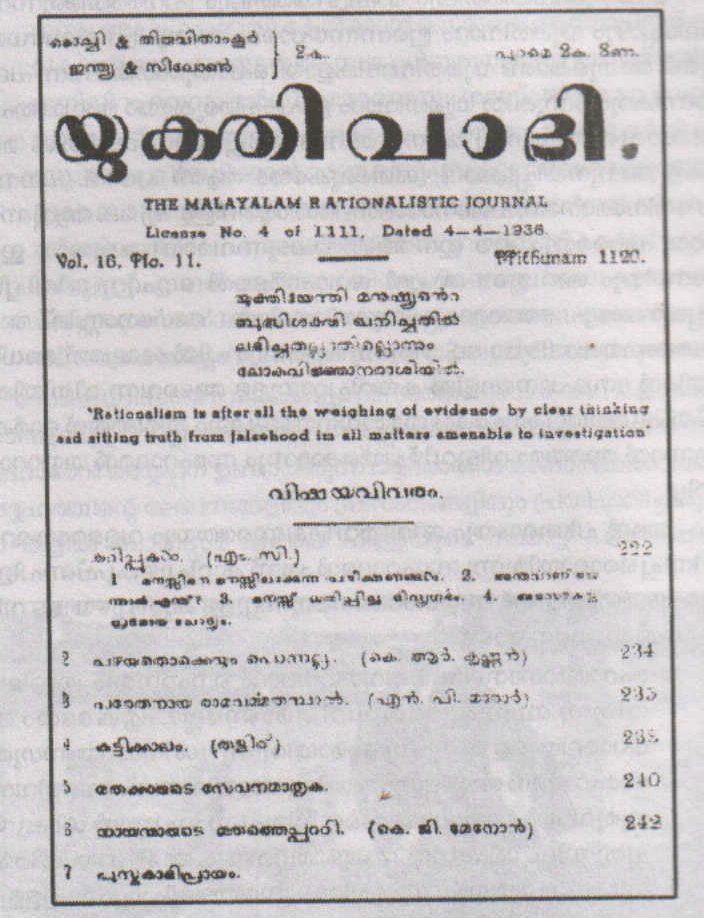
Issue of Yukthivadi, The Malayalam Rationalist Journal, dated 4 April 1936

== Books ==
1. Purogathi (Progress) (1947)
2. Yukthiprakasham (Light of Reason) (1966)
3. Prabhodhanam (1966)
4. Ashayasamaram (1976)
5. Thiranjetutha Kurippukal (Selected Notes)(1976)
6. Chinthaviplavam (1976)
7. Nasthikya Chintha (Atheist Thoughts)(1977)
8. Swatanthra Chintha (Free Thought)(1978)
9. Kuttichathan (Goblins)(1983)
10. Emciyute Lekhanangal (Essays)(1991)
11. Emciyute Darshanangal (1995)
12. Jotsyam Oru Kapada Sasthram (2004) Indian Atheist Publishers
13. Punarjanma Smaranakal (2004) Indian Atheist Publishers
14. Kalathinu Mumpe Nadannavar (2005) Indian Atheist Publisher

== List of recipients of Yukthivadi M. C. Joseph Award ==
Yukthivadi M. C. Joseph Award was constituted by the rationalist organisation Bharatheeya Yukthivadi Sangham, founded by Sreeni Pattathanam. The award is given to persons who stood for rational and secularist causes.

Year	Recipient	Profession
2004	Kureepuzha Sreekumar	Malayalam Poet
2006	Pavanan	Former Secretary, Kerala Sahithya Academy
2008	Thilakan	Malayalam Film Actor
2010	Vaisakhan	Former President, Kerala Sahithya Academy
2013	Paul Zacharia	Author
2015	Anand	Author, Critic
2017	Prof. M. K. Sanu	Author, intellect
