= Cherai =

Town in Kerala, India

- town
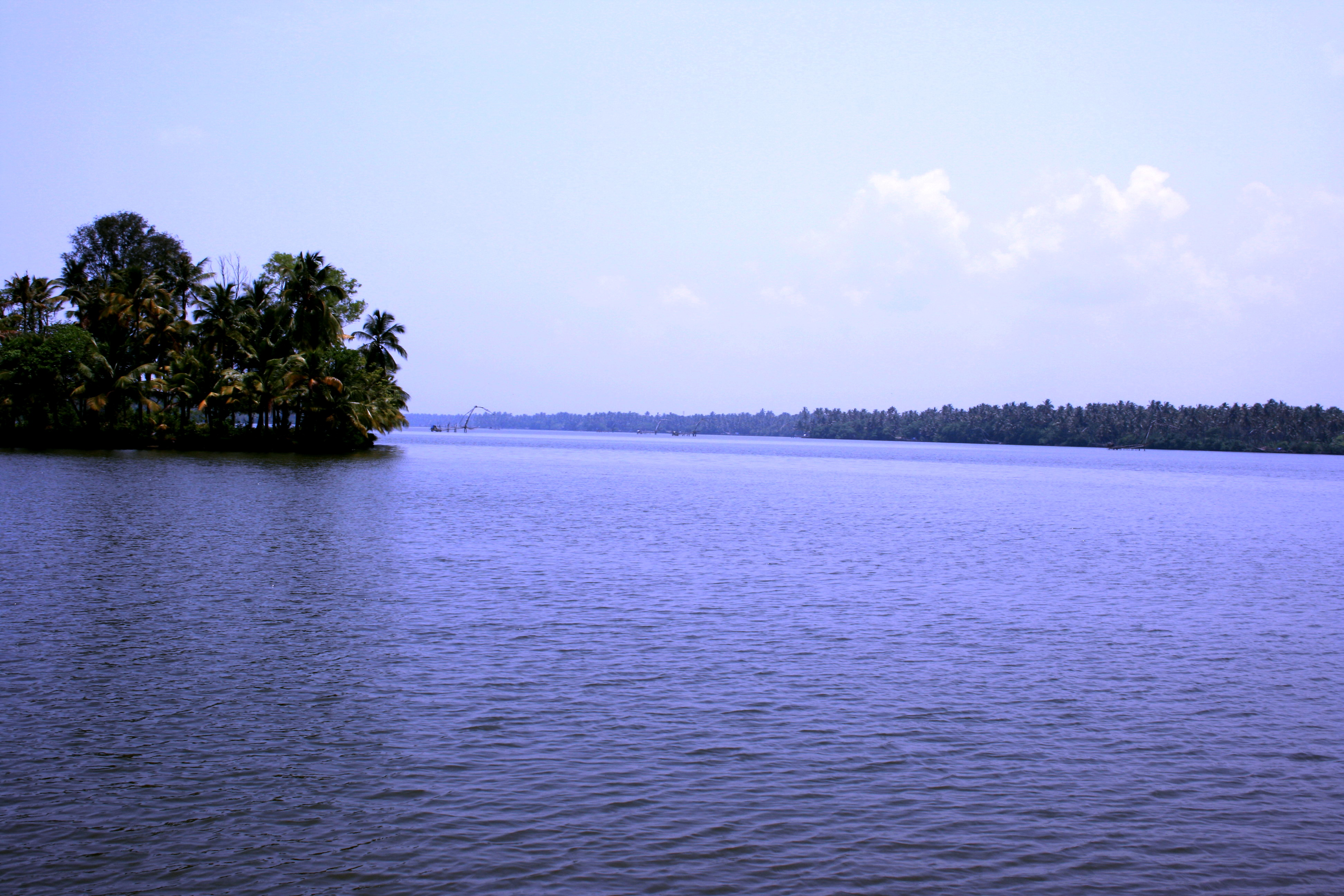
- Cherai Lagoon2

- Location in Kerala, India
- Coordinates: 9.977°N 76.27°E
- Country: India
- State: Kerala
- District: Ernakulam

Government
  - Panchayat President: Sri. Radhakrishnan
- Elevation: 0 m (0 ft)

Languages
  - Official: Malayalam, English
- Time zone: UTC+5:30 (IST)
- PIN: 683514
- Telephone code: 0484
- Climate: Am (Köppen)

Cherai is a small town located in north side of Vypin island. It is a region in the suburb of the city of Kochi, in the state of Kerala, India. It is at a distance of about 22.6 km (14.0 mi) from the High Court Junction, Kochi.

Cherai has the longest beach in Kochi - the Cherai beach. The beach is located towards the centre-north of the Vypin island which is said to have formed in 1341. The Cherai Beach is 10 km (6.2 mi) long. Dolphins are occasionally seen here.

Cherai has played an important role in the history of modern Kerala by becoming the birthplace of two prominent political personsages of modern Kerala - Mathai Manjooran and Sahodaran Ayyappan.

Cherai Gowreeshwara Temple is one of the main Hindu temples. The temple is maintained by Vijnana Vardhini Sabha (V. V Sabha). It also known as Kerala palani. The festival in the temple is the biggest festival in Ernakulam district. The festival happens every year towards the last 2 weeks of January or first 2 weeks of February. The main attractions are Elephant parade (around 20-30 elephants).

There is one more famous temple in Cherai, which is Azheekkal Sree Varaha Temple famous for its beautiful chariot. It is one of the oldest temple owned by Gowda Saraswatha Community.

== Nearby attractions ==
- Kottakkavu Mar Thoma Syro-Malabar Pilgrim Church, North Paravur: First church in India and one of the seven churches founded by St. Thomas the Apostle in the first century.
- Portuguese Fort: Built in 1503 by the Portuguese also known as Pallipuram Fort (Aya Kotta). It is the oldest European monument in India. It was an out post to safeguard the famous Muziris Port. In 1661 the Dutch captured the fort and in 1789 the fort was handed over to the King of Travancore.
- Pallipuram Basilica of Our Lady of Snow: The church is built by the Portuguese in 1577. The exquisite picture of Virgin Mary on the top of "Altar" is brought from Portugal. The yearly celebrations of Lady of snow happening in August every year. The Water parade of boats is one of the notable function.

== Notable people ==
- Mathai Manjooran
- Sahodaran Ayyappan
- Mary Verghese
- TVR Shenoy
- S. Sharma
- M. K. Prasad

== Gallery ==
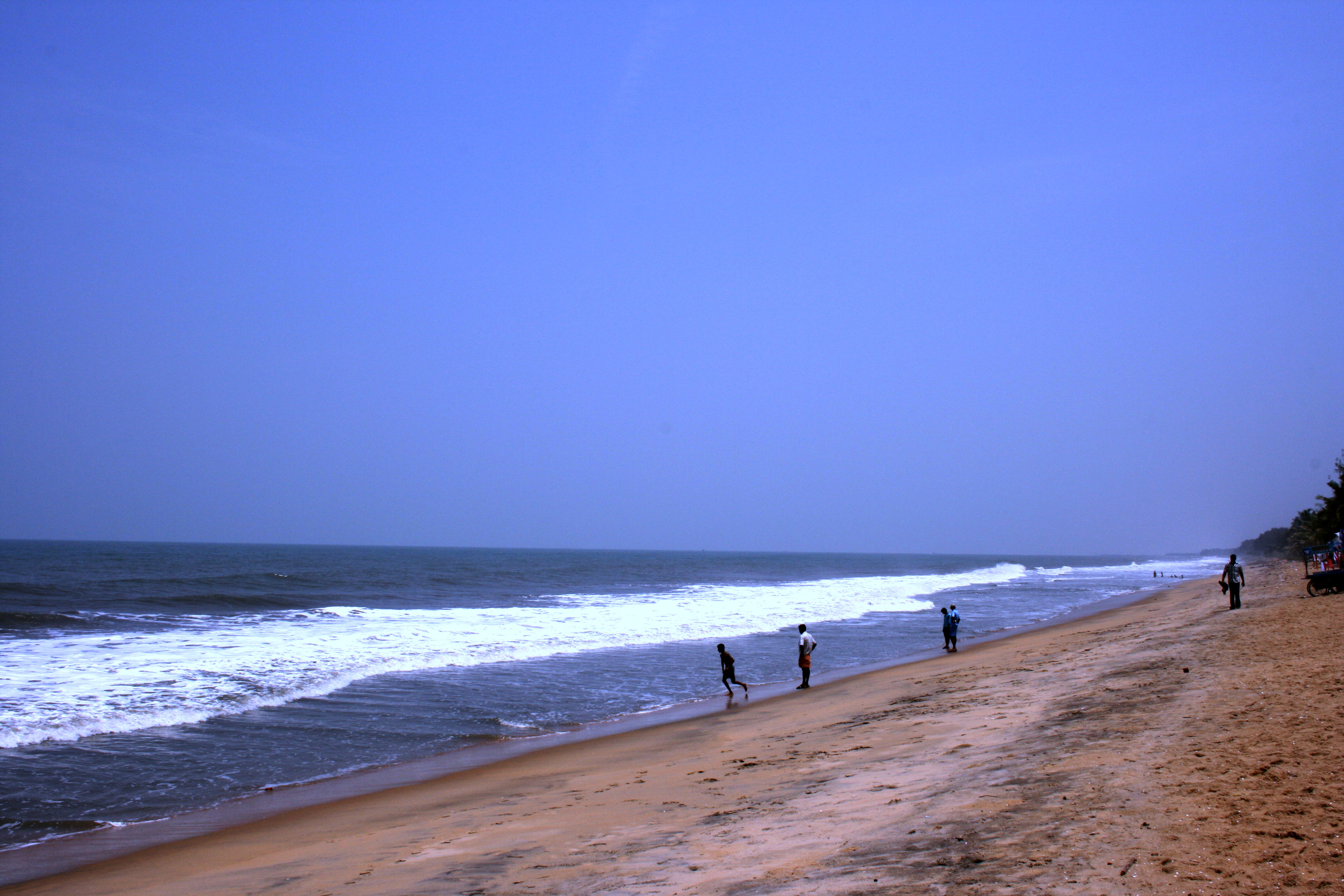
Cherai beach

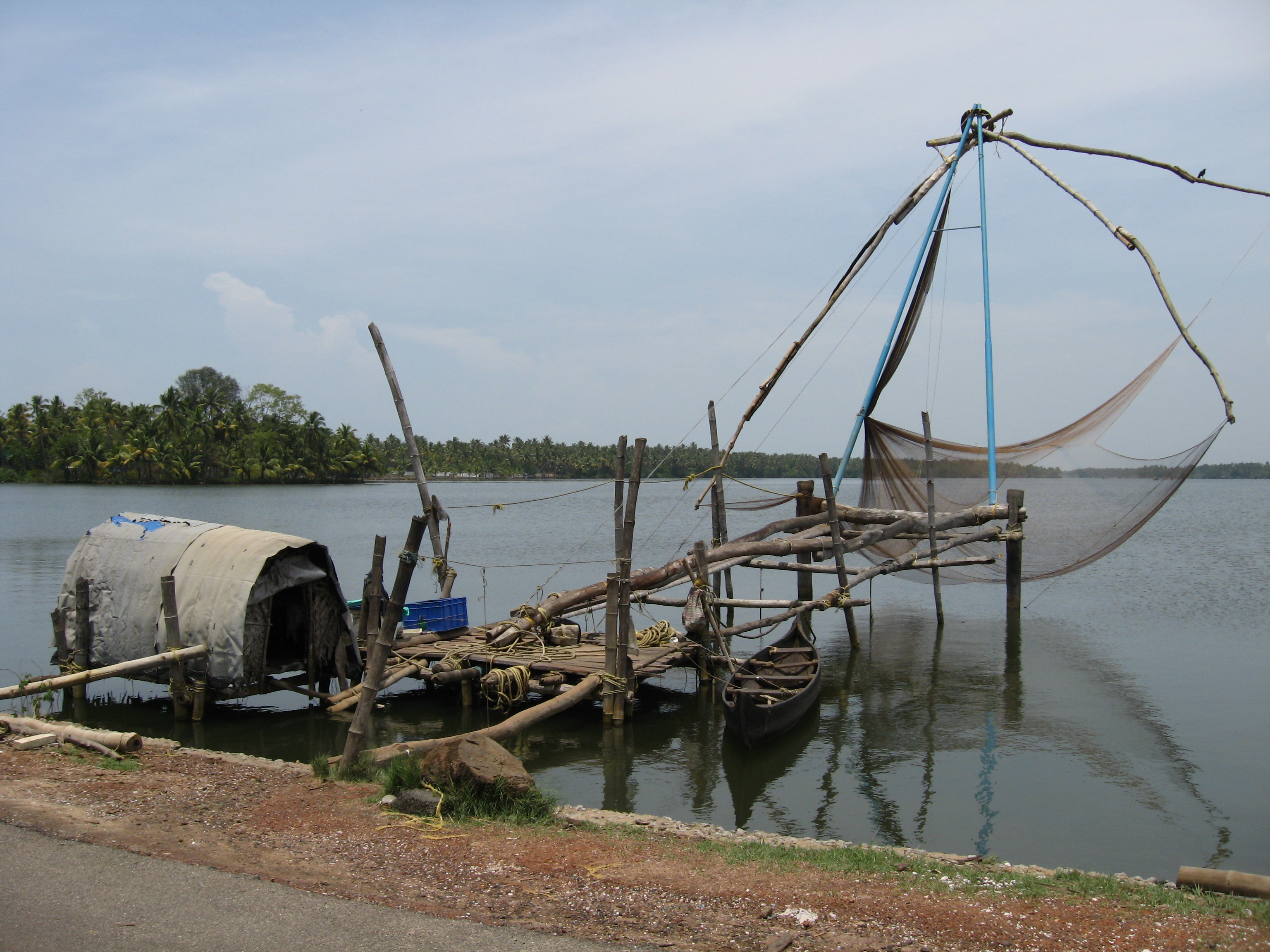
Chinese fishing nets

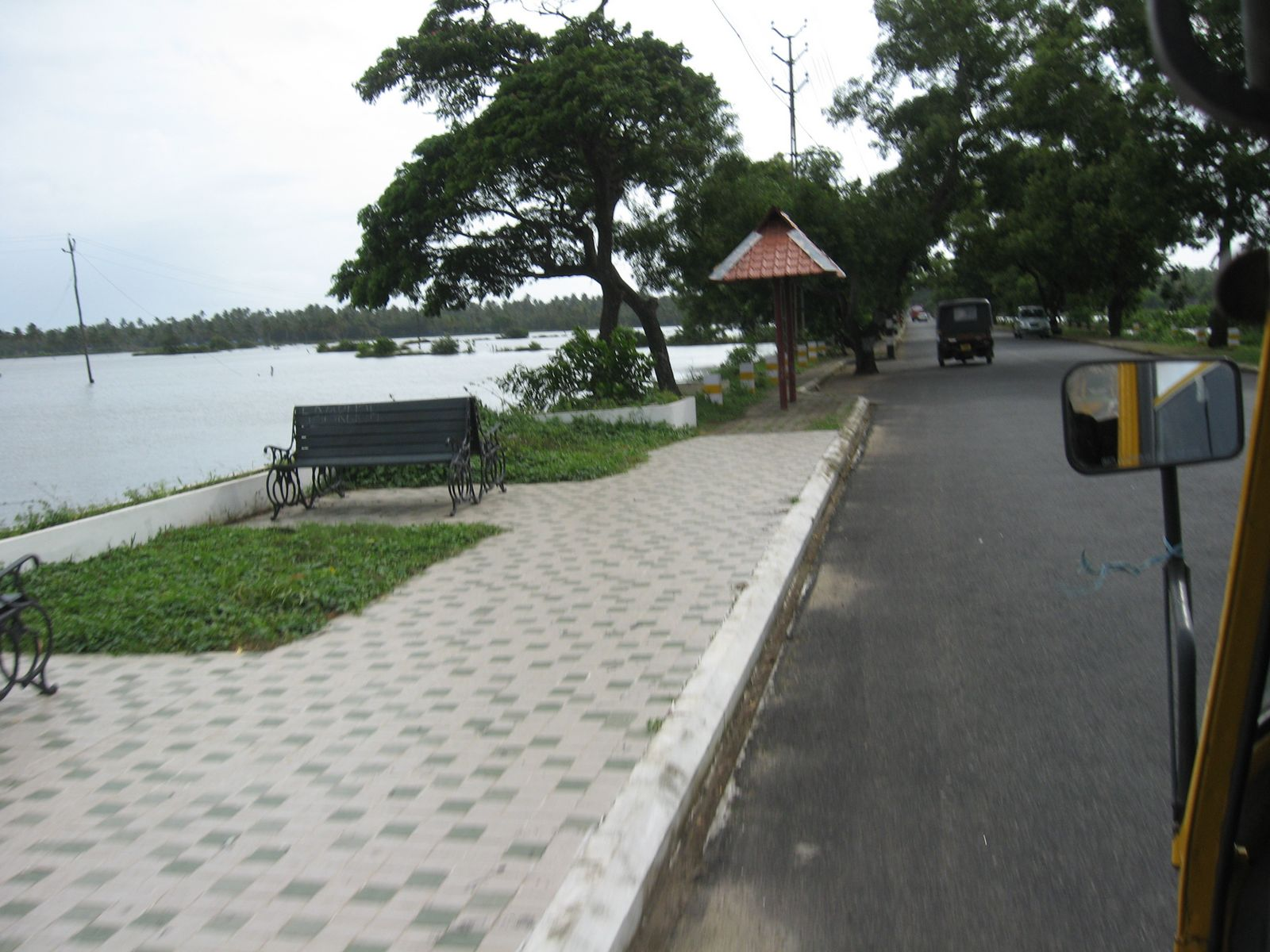
Walkway on the sides of the road to Cherai from North Paravur
