= Pavanan =

Indian activist

- Born: Puthan Veetil Narayanan Nair; October 26, 1926; Thalassery, Kerala, India
- Died: June 22, 2006 (aged 79)
- Occupations: Atheist, journalist, politician, author, activist
- Political party: Communist Party of India
- Spouse: Parvathi Pavanan

Puthan Veetil Narayanan Nair, fondly called and popularly known by his pen name Pavanan who was born on 26 October 1926 and died on 22 June 2006, was a well-known rationalist, literary critic and left wing political activist from Kerala, India. He was also a well-accomplished author and journalist, who had won the Kerala Sahithya Akademi Award in 1965 and the Soviet Land Nehru Award in 1979. He was the secretary of the Kerala Sahithya Academy (1977–84) and the General Secretary of the Kerala Union of Working Journalists, and a member of Kerala Kalamandalam and Kerala Sangeetha Nataka Academy. Pavanan was the editor of Malayalam Encyclopedia. He had authored more than a dozen books. Pavanan Foundation Award was constituted by Pavanan Foundation to recognize and honour literary works. In 2011 M. K. Sanu, Malayalam critic and writer had received this award.

== Early days and family ==
Pavanan was born on 26 October 1926 at Vayalalam, Thalassery, Kerala, India. His father was Kuttamath Kunniyur Kunhisankara Kurup and mother, Puthan Veetil Devaki Amma. He had his education at Raja's High School, Nileshwaram, Kasaragod and at Brennen College High School, Thalassery.

Pavanan married Parvathy in 1954 in Ottappalam (Palakkad District, Kerala). They have three children: CP Rajendran (geoscientist), CP Surendran (poet; author) and CP Sree Rekha (writer in Malayalam).

== Career ==
During 1944–46, Pavanan served in the Indian Army of British India. Later, after leaving the army, he worked as an Inspector in Co-operative Department in north Kerala.

Since 1949, Pavanan took up journalism as his career along with his left-wing political activism. He first stint as a journalist was as an editorial board member of the Malayalam journal, Jayakeralam, published from Chennai then known as Madras. During 1952–53 he worked as a sub-editor of Pourashakthi before becoming a staff-reporter with Deshabhimani, the Malayalam organ of the Communist Party of India. During 1965–67, he worked as the editor of Navayugom and as correspondent of India Press Agency. He was a style editor with Soviet Information Office, Chennai during 1970–75 and General Editor with Manorajyam group of publications during 1984–86. He then, during 1988–94, worked as Director-in-Charge of Vishwa Vijnana Kosham, an Encyclopedia published by the Government of Kerala. Pavanan was Assistant Secretary of Kerala Sahitya Academy between 1975–78 and its Member Secretary during 1978–84.

== A rationalist ==
As a rationalist, Pavanan was the founder-Chief-editor of Yukthirekha, the organ of Kerala Yukthivadi Sangham, a well-known rationalist group in Kerala. He was the organization's president for a long time before he was afflicted with Parkinson’s disease from which he had been suffering for the last 4–5 years of his life.

== Awards and honours ==
Pavanan was awarded the Sovietland-Nehru Award (twice), Kerala Sahitya Akademy Award, G. Sankara Kurup Award, Puthezhan Memorial Award, Vailoppally Memorial Award, M.C. Joseph award as well as V.T. Bhattathrippad Memorial Award for his contribution in the fields of journalism and literature. He received Emeritus Fellowship (1989–93) from the Human Resource Department, Government of India.

== Death ==
Pavanan died on 22 June 2006 at Trissur at 7:15 am, after a prolonged illness.

After his death, his eyes were donated to an eye bank. Following his wishes, he was cremated without any religious ceremonies thus upholding his rationalist ideal until his death.

== Books by Pavanan ==
Pavanan wrote more than 40 books in Malayalam and English languages. Some of the titles are:

=== In Malayalam ===
1. Keralam Engane Jeevikkunnu (1967)
2. Parichayam (1968)
3. Soviet Unionanil Krushchevinu Sesham (1965)
4. Mahakavi Kuttamath (1980)
5. Pavanante Thiranjedutha Prabhandangal (1988)
6. Adyakala Smaranakal (1990)
7. Sahitya Nirupanam
8. Yathra Vivaranam
9. Thathva Chintha
10. Yukthivadam
11. Jeevacharithra Smaranakal
12. Yukthi Darsanam (editor) (Published by Kerala Yukthivadi Sangham)
13. Brahmananda Shivayogi (Biography)
14. Matham, Marxism, Mathetharatwam
15. Peristroicayum Socialisavum (1992)

=== In English ===
1. A journey through Moscow and Georgia
2. What happened in China
3. Buddhist influence in Malayalam Literature
