= List of Bal Sahitya Puraskar winners for Malayalam =

Winners of a literary honour in India

Part of a series on

Sahitya Akademi Awards
Category
Sahitya Akademi Award winners by language
- Assamese
- Bengali
- Bodo
- Dogri
- English
- Gujarati
- Hindi
- Kannada
- Kashmiri
- Konkani
- Maithili
- Malayalam
- Marathi
- Meitei (Manipuri)
- Nepali
- Odia
- Punjabi
- Rajasthani
- Sanskrit
- Santali
- Sindhi
- Tamil
- Telugu
- Urdu
Sahitya Akademi Translation Prizes
- Assamese
- Bengali
- Bodo
- Dogri
- English
- Gujarati
- Hindi
- Kannada
- Kashmiri
- Konkani
- Maithili
- Malayalam
- Marathi
- Meitei (Manipuri)
- Nepali
- Odia
- Punjabi
- Rajasthani
- Sanskrit
- Santali
- Sindhi
- Tamil
- Telugu
- Urdu
Sahitya Akademi Yuva Puraskar
- Assamese
- Bengali
- Bodo
- Dogri
- English
- Gujarati
- Hindi
- Kannada
- Kashmiri
- Konkani
- Maithili
- Malayalam
- Meitei (Manipuri)
- Marathi
- Nepali
- Odia
- Punjabi
- Rajasthani
- Sanskrit
- Santali
- Sindhi
- Tamil
- Telugu
- Urdu
Sahitya Akademi Bal Sahitya Puraskar
- Assamese
- Bengali
- Bodo
- Dogri
- English
- Gujarati
- Hindi
- Kannada
- Kashmiri
- Konkani
- Maithili
- Malayalam
- Meitei (Manipuri)
- Marathi
- Nepali
- Odia
- Punjabi
- Rajasthani
- Sanskrit
- Santali
- Sindhi
- Tamil
- Telugu
- Urdu
Related
- Eighth Schedule to the Constitution of India
- Official Languages Commission
- List of languages by number of native speakers in India

Bal Sahitya Puraskar is given each year to writers for their outstanding works in the 24 languages, since 2010.

== Recipients ==
Following is the list of recipients of Bal Sahitya Puraskar for their works written in Malayalam. The award comprises a cash prize of Rs. 50,000 and an engraved copper plaque.

Year	Author	Work	Genre	Ref.
2010	Sippy Pallippuram	Oridath Oridathu Oru Kunjunni	Short Stories	
2011	K. Pappootty	Chiruthakkuttiyum Mashum	Science-Novel	
2012	K. Sreekumar	Total Contribution to Children's Literature		
2013	Sumangala (Leela Nambudiripad)	Total Contribution to Children's Literature		
2014	K. V. Ramanadhan	Total Contribution to Children's Literature		
2015	S. Sivadas	Total Contribution to Children's Literature		
2016	N. P. Hafiz Mohamad	Kuttippattalathinte Keralaparyadanam	Informative Literature	
2017	S. R. Lal	Kunhunniyude Yathrapusthakam	Novel	
2018	P. K. Gopi	Olachoottintte Velicham	Short Stories	
2019	Malayath Appunni	Total Contribution to Children's Literature		
2020	Gracy	Vazhthappetta Poocha	Stories	
2021	Raghunath Paleri	Avar Moovarum Oru Mazhavillum	Novel	
2022	Sethu (A. Sethumadhavan)	Chekkutty	Novel	
2023	Priya A. S.	Perumazhayathe Kunjithalukal	Novel	
2024	Unni Ammayambalam	Algorithangalude Nadu	Novel	
2025	Sreejith Moothedath	Penguinukalute Vankarayil	Novel	

== See also ==
- List of Sahitya Akademi Award winners for Malayalam
