= Kerala Sahitya Akademi Award for Children's Literature =

Literary award

The Kerala Sahitya Akademi Award for Children's Literature is given every year by the Kerala Sahitya Akademi (Kerala Literary Academy) to a Malayalam author for writing children's literature of literary merit. It is one of the 12 categories of the Kerala Sahitya Akademi Award.

== Awardees ==
Year	Book	Writer	Image	Ref.
1959	Mudanthanaya Muyal	C. A. Kittunni		
1960	Anakkaran	Karoor Neelakanta Pillai		
1961	Vikritiraman	P. Narendranath		
1962	Tiruvonam	Tiruvalla Kesava Pillai		
1963	Gandhi Kathakal	A. P. Parameswaran Pillai		
1964	Nadunarunnu	G. Kamalamma		
1965	Gosayi Paranja Katha	Lalithambika Antharjanam		
1966	Kuttikalude Indrapastam	Umayanalloor Balakrishna Pillai		
1967	Kadinte Katha	C. S. Nair		
1968	Dr. Carvel	P. Sreedharan Pillai		
1969	Mali Bhagavatam	Mali Madhavan Nair		
1970	Tolstoy Farm	K. Bheeman Nair		
1971	Lucky Star Turlin Shirt	L. I. Justin Raj		
1972	Urulaykupperi	Murkot Kunhappa		
1973	Khedda	Jose Kunnappally		
1974	Rasatantra Kathakal	S. Sivadas		
1975	Kunhayante Kusrutikal	V. P. Mohammed		
1976	Prakriti Sastram Kuttikalkku	P. T. Bhaskara Panicker		
1977	Aksharathettu	Kunjunni Mash		
1978	Vayuvinte Katha	Dr. T. R. Sankunni		
1979	Mithayippoti	Sumangala		
1980	Doore Doore Doore	P. R. Madhava Panicker		
1981	Pyramidinte Nattil	M. P. Parameswaran		
1982	Muthu Mazha	Kilimanoor Viswambharan		
1983	Unnikkuttanum Kathakaliyum	T. K. D. Muzhappilangad		
1984	Evoorinte Bala Sahitya Kritikal	Evoor Parameswaran		
1985	Oru Koottam Urumbukal	G. Sankara Pillai		
1986	Minnu	Lalitha Lenin		
1987	Avar Nalu Per	N. P. Mohammed		
1988	Aruth Kattala	E. A. Karunakaran Nair		
1989	Kannan Kakkayude Kaushalangal	Muhamma Ramanan		
1990	Pokkuveyilettal Ponnakum	C. G. Santhakumar		
1991	Appuppan Tadiyude Swarga Yatra	Sippy Pallippuram		
1992	Tentulli	Kalamandalam Kesavan		
1993	2 + 1 = 2	K. K. Vasu		
1994	Albutha Neerali	K. V. Ramanadhan		
1995	Kiniyude Katha	A. Vijayan		
1996	Pujyathinte Katha	Palliyara Sreedharan		
1997	Bahumanyanaya Padusha	N. P. Hafiz Mohamad		
1998	Kambili Kuppayam	Malayath Appunni		
1999	Kuttikalude EMS	K. T. Gopi		
2000	Swarna Thakkol	Kiliroor Radhakrishnan		
2001	Chirikkatha Kutty	Gangadharan Chengaloor		
2002	Chakravartiye Urumbu Thinnunnu	K. Thayat		
2003	Penangunni	Kureepuzha Sreekumar		
2004	Makkachi Kathakal	C. R. Das		
2005	50 Eureka Kathakal	Kesavan Vellikulangara		
2006	Chithrasalabhangalude Veedu	Priya A. S.		
2007	Pustaka Kalikal	S. Sivadas		
2008	Chiruthakuttiyum Mashum	K. Pappootti		
2009	Muyalchevi	A. Vijayan		
2010	Nadannu Theeratha Vazhikal	Sumangala		
2011	Gandhijiyude Athmakatha Kuttikalkku	K. Radhakrishnan		
2012	Kuttipattalathinte Kerala Paryadanam	N. P. Hafiz Mohamad		
2013	Unnikalkku Noottiyettu Gurudeva Kathakal	Sippy Pallippuram		
2014	Aanathookkam Velli	M. Sivaprasad		
2015	Sunny Cherukkanum Sangeetha Pengalum	Ezhacherry Ramachandran		
2016	Samoohyapaatam	K. T. Baburaj		
2017	Kurukkan Mashinte School	V. R. Sudheesh		
2018	Kunjunniyude Yathrapusthakam	S. R. Lal		
2019	Hisaga	K. R. Viswanathan		
2020	Perumazhayathe Kunjithalukal	Priya A. S.		
2021	Avar Moovarum Oru Mazhavillum	Raghunath Paleri		
2022	Chakkaramambazham	K. Sreekumar		
2023	Penkuttiyum Koottarum	Gracy		
2024	Ammamanamulla Kanivukal	E. N. Sheeja		
