= 2024 Kerala Sahitya Akademi Awards =

Indian literary awards

Kerala Sahitya Akademi Award
- Awarded for: Outstanding books of literary merit
- Date: 26 June 2025
- Location: Trichur
- Country: India
- Presented by: Kerala Sahitya Akademi
- First award: 1958

The 2024 Kerala Sahitya Akademi Awards was announced on 26 June 2025. Instituted in 1958, the award is given in a dozen categories each year, by the Kerala Sahitya Akademi (Kerala Literary Academy), to Malayalam writers for their outstanding books of literary merit.

== Winners ==
| Category | Recipient | Work | Image |
|---|---|---|---|
| Poetry | Anitha Thampi | Muringa Vazha Kariveppu | |
| Novel | G. R. Indugopan | Aano | |
| Story | V. Shinilal | Garisappa Aruvi Adhava Oru Jalayatra | |
| Drama | Sasidharan Naduvil | Pithalashalabham | |
| Literary Criticism | G. Dileepan | Ramayanathinte Charithrasanchaarangal | |
| Biography and Autobiography | K. Rajasekharan Nair | Njan Enna Bhaavam | |
| Travelogue | K. R. Ajayan | Aarohanam Himalayam | |
| Humour | Niranjan | Keralathinte Maidhathmakatha | |
| Children's Literature | E. N. Sheeja | Ammamanamulla Kanivukal | |
| Scholarly Literature | Deepak P. | Nirmithabuddhikalathe Samoohika Rashtreeya Jeevitham | |
| Translation | Chinju Prakash | Ente Rajyam Ente Shareeram | |
| Overall Contributions | P. K. N. Panicker; Payyannur Kunhiraman; M. M. Narayanan; T. K. Gangadharan; K. E. N. Kunhahammed; Mallika Yunis | | |
