= T. R. Sankunni =

Indian writer (1935-2026)

- Born: February 12, 1935; Karalam, Cochin Kingdom, British India
- Died: April 4, 2026 (aged 91); Patturaikkal, Thrissur, Kerala, India
- Occupation: Writer
- Spouse: Radha
- Children: 3
- Writing career
- Genres: Children's literature, Novel
- Notable awards: Award of the Kerala State Institute of Children's Literature; the Kerala Sahitya Akademi Award for Children's Literature

T. R. Sankunni was an Indian writer and educationist. He was known in various fields including science writing, children's literature, novelist, and teacher. He has won the National Award for Children's Literature, Award of the Kerala State Institute of Children's Literature, the Kerala Sahitya Akademi Award for Children's Literature, and the Urub Award

== Biography ==
T. R. Sankunni was born on February 12, 1935, in Karalam village near Irinjalakuda in present-day Thrissur district of Kerala to Thevaruparambil Ravunni and Chittikapil Ishwariamma. After passing his intermediate examination at Cherpp CNN School, his studies were interrupted for two years due to financial constraints. During that time, he spent most of his time in the library. He became interested in English literature and read world classics during that time. Although he was more interested in Malayalam literature, he graduated from the Veterinary College and became a teacher there.

The turning point in his literary career was a three-day writers' gathering held at Ramavarmapuram, Thrissur in 1969. Leading Malayalam writers like S. K. Pottekkatt, M. T. Vasudevan Nair, Parappurath, and S. Guptan Nair participated there.

Sankunni, a native of Karalam, had been living in Patturaikkal, Thrissur for a long time.

=== Personal life and death ===
Sankunni and his wife Radha, a member of the Palathinkal family in Aluva have three children, Jayashankar, Director of the Forest Research Institute, Walayar, Dr. Maya, Professor of Anatomy at Mannuthi Vettinari College, and S. Priya, an advocate. He died on April 4, 2026, at the age of 91.

== Career ==
Sankunni was a member of the General Council of the Sahitya Akademi for five years from 1983.

Sankunni was an early activist of the Kerala Sastra Sahitya Parishad and the founding editor of Eureka magazine.

Sankunni, who was appointed as the first Assistant Registrar Kerala Agricultural University, later worked there as the Public Relations Officer. He also served as the Senior Deputy Registrar, Academic Department, Kerala Agricultural University.

== Literary Contributions ==
Sankunni's main literary works include six popular science books, including the Shastra Gopurathinte Rajashilpikal, fifteen children's literature books including Vayuinte Katha, which won the Kerala Sahitya Akademi Award and the National Award, and Hitopadesha Katha, which won the Kerala State Children's Literature Award, and fifteen novels, including Veda Sakshi, which won the Urub Award.

His first novel, Yathibhangam, was published in 1969, and later wrote the novel Yathanaparvam, based on a mother from Yathibhangam.

His novel Nakshatra Bungalow discussed various issues such as, the dismantling of the family structure from the son-in-law's legacy and extended family structure to the nuclear family, and the aftereffects of the lives of those who were victims of Mappila riots in Kerala. The novel is being criticized because the characters in the novel has some similarities with some familiar figures related to him. In 2004, DC Books selected and published seventy-five novels out of the nearly five thousand novels published in Malayalam up to that point, and one of them was Nakshatra Bungalow.

The early three novels were written under the pen name Revathi.

== Selected works ==
=== Novels ===
- Nakshatra Bungalow (in Malayalam). DC Books.

=== Children's literature ===
- Abhiramaparvam (in Malayalam). H&C Books. 1 January 2019. ISBN 978-9388952866.
- Hithopadesha Katakal (in Malayalam). H&C Books. 1 January 2016. ISBN 978-9385916649.
- Oru Melpathur Kanavu (in Malayalam). H&C Books. April 2019. ISBN 9789388952279. Based on life of Melpathur Narayana Bhattathiri.
- Thampurante Swantham Chimmutty (in Malayalam). H&C Books. December 2018. ISBN 9789387911918. Based on life of Chimmukkutti, wife of Sakthan Thampuran.
- Njan Vaidehi (in Malayalam). H&C Books. November 2018. ISBN 9789384693671. Based on life of Seetha of Ramayana.
- Krishnapaksham (in Malayalam). H&C Books. July 2015. ISBN 9789384582357. Based on life of Krishna.

=== Science ===
- Lokaprasastha Sasthrajnarum Kandupidithangalum [Famous scientists and inventions] (in Malayalam). DC Books. 16 April 2005.

== Awards and honors ==
Sankunni has won the National Award for Children's Literature, Award of the Kerala State Institute of Children's Literature, the Kerala Sahitya Akademi Award, and the Urub Award.
