= Payyannur Kunhiraman =

Indian Malayalam language writer and translator

- Kunhiraman in 2025
- Born: 1946 (age 79–80); Payyannur, Malabar district, Madras Presidency, British India
- Occupations: Writer, translator
- Spouse: Satyabhama A.
- Children: 2
- Parents: Kallidil Kannapothuval (father); Ramanath Parvathyamma (mother)
- Writing career
- Genres: Biography, Political history, Children's literature, Translation
- Notable awards: Kerala Sahitya Akademi Award for Overall Contributions (2024)

Payyannur Kunhiraman also spelled as Payyannur Kunjiraman is an Indian Malayalam language writer, translator and orator from Kerala. He received several awards including the Abu Dhabi Sakthi Award, Lifetime Achievement Award from the Kerala State Institute of Children's Literature and the Kerala Sahitya Akademi Award for Overall Contributions.

== Biography ==
Kunhiraman was born in 1946 in Payyannur in present-day Kannur district of Kerala to Kallidil Kannapothuval and Ramanath Parvathyamma. His father was knowledgeable in traditional medicine. Following a dispute with the head of the family, his parents left their ancestral home with their five children and moved to Karkala in Karnataka and subsequently lived in a rented house there. Kannapothuval, who knew traditional medicine, was unable to meet the family's expenses with the income he earned from selling his medicine, so he sent his two eldest sons to work. The eldest son then learned to make beedi and Kunhiraman learned to spin yarn. Even though his formal education was interrupted, Kunhiraman spent his free time learning Kannada with the help of children from neighbouring households.

Later, after returning to Payyannur he too entered the beedi making profession. He learned making beedi from Gopalan in Mavicheri and started his career as one of the hundreds of beedi workers. The main entertainment of beedi workers that time was reading newspapers and listening to the radio. As a young beedi worker, Kunhiraman regularly read newspapers and literary works aloud to other workers. His reading introduced him to the works of Malayalam writers including Vaikom Muhammad Basheer, Thakazhi Sivasankara Pillai and P. Kesavadev. A former schoolmate, Ramaswamy, encouraged him to continue his education privately. Kunhiraman subsequently completed his secondary education through private study.

He then pursued further studies and completed the L.T.T.C. course at a training institute in Kozhikode, financing his education partly through private tuition. After completing the course, he joined Moothedath High School in Taliparamba as a Hindi teacher.

=== Personal life ===
Kunhiraman and his wife Satyabhama A. K. have two children, Sbitha and Sooraj.

== Literary career ==
Kunhiraman's interest in translation developed after he read Chirasmarane, a Kannada work by Niranjana about the Kayyur uprising. He subsequently corresponded with Niranjana and began translating works by Niranjana and his wife Anupama Niranjana into Malayalam. His translations included works such as Rangammayude Vatakapparambu, Mrityunjayan, Kaveri Ente Raktham, Banashankari, Minnal and Niranjanayude Kathakal, as well as Anupama's Ghosham and Cheriyude Vilapam.

As of 2025, Kunhiraman had written about 100 books, approximately half of them are translations. He had translated 28 books from Kannada into Malayalam including works by Kannada writers Niranjana, Anupama, P. V. Narayana, Srikrishna Alanahalli and Banu Mushtaq.

Kunhiraman is a member of the state committee of the Purogamana Kala Sahitya Sangham.

== Selected works ==
=== Biographies ===
- Payyannur Kunhiraman (2020). Niranjana: Kayyoorinte Kathikan [Niranjana: The one who told Kayyur's story] (in Malayalam) (1st ed.). Chintha publishers. ISBN 9789389410167. Biography of Kannada novelist Niranjana
- Payyannur Kunhiraman (2012). Oreyoru PG: Ezhithum Jeevithavum [One and only PG: Life and writings] (in Malayalam) (1st ed.). Chintha publishers. ISBN 9788126208333. Biography of P. Govinda Pillai.
- Payyannur Kunhiraman (2021). Kavithrayam: Ashan, Ulloor, Vallathol [Triumvirate poets: Ashan, Ulloor and Vallathol] (in Malayalam) (3rd ed.). Chintha publishers. ISBN 9789386637499. Biographies of Malayalam triumvirate poets Kumaran Asan, Vallathol Narayana Menon and Ulloor S. Parameswara Iyer.
- Payyannur Kunhiraman (2021). Padmanabhante vazhiyil [In the way of Padmanabhan] (in Malayalam) (2nd ed.). Chintha publishers. ISBN 9789383903665. Biography and personal memoirs on P. Padmanabhan.
- Payyannur Kunhiraman (2022). Kuttikalude Nayanar [Children's Nayanar] (in Malayalam) (3rd ed.). Chintha publishers. ISBN 9789385018060. Biography of E. K. Nayanar for children.
- Payyannur Kunhiraman (2022). Kalburgi Sahithyathile Rakthasakshi [Kalburgi, a martyr in literature] (in Malayalam) (2nd ed.). Chintha publishers. ISBN 9789385045318. Biography of M. M. Kalburgi.
- Payyannur Kunhiraman (2013). P Krishnapilla Jeevithavum Rashtriyapravarthanavum [P. Krishna Pillai, Life and political career]. Nammute Nethakkanmar (in Malayalam). Thrissur, Kerala, India: Green Books. ISBN 978-81-8423-248-6. Biography of P. Krishna Pillai.
- Payyannur Kunhiraman. G. Sankarakuruppu Jnanapeetajethavu [G. Sankara Kurup winner of Jnanpith Award]. Nammute Ezhuthukar (in Malayalam). Thrissur, Kerala, India: Little Green (subsidiary of Green Books). ISBN 9788184231205. Biography of G. Sankara Kurup for children.
- Payyannur Kunhiraman. S. K. Pottekkatt Jnanapeetajethavu [S. K. Pottekkatt winner of Jnanpith Award]. Nammute Ezhuthukar (in Malayalam). Thrissur, Kerala, India: Little Green (subsidiary of Green Books). ISBN 9789380884776. Biography of S. K. Pottekkatt for children.
- Payyannur Kunhiraman (2012). Thakazhi Jnanapeetajethavu [Thakazhi winner of Jnanpith Award]. Nammute Ezhuthukar (in Malayalam). Thrissur, Kerala, India: Little Green (subsidiary of Green Books). ISBN 978-8184231212. Biography of Thakazhi Sivasankara Pillai for children.
- Payyannur Kunhiraman. Muringamaram chanja veedu (in Malayalam). Thrissur, Kerala, India: Green Books. ISBN 9789380884530. Biography of T. Padmanabhan.
- Payyannur Kunhiraman (2018). Gandhijiyute Jeevithakatha [life story of Gandhiji] (in Malayalam) (1st ed.). Chintha publishers. ISBN 9789387842861. Biography of Mahatma Gandhi.
- Payyannur Kunhiraman (2020). A K Gopalan (in Malayalam) (1st ed.). Kerala State Institute of Children's Literature. ISBN 9788184940251. Biography of A. K. Gopalan for children.
- Payyannur Kunhiraman (2021). EMSinte Jeevithakadha [Life story of EMS] (in Malayalam) (1st ed.). Kerala State Institute of Children's Literature. Biography of E. M. S. Namboodiripad for children.
- Payyannur Kunhiraman. EMS Kathakal [EMS stories] (in Malayalam) (1st ed.). Chintha publishers. ISBN 9788126207435.
- Payyannur Kunhiraman (2007). Elamkulathe kunju [The child from Elamkulam] (in Malayalam) (1st ed.). Chintha publishers. Biography of EMS for children.
- Payyannur Kunhiraman (2008). Enikku venam Swathanthryam:A K G [I want freedom: A K G] (in Malayalam) (2nd ed.). Chintha publishers. Biography of A. K. Gopalan for children.

=== History and culture ===
- Payyannur Kunhiraman (2023). Party piranna vazhikal [The ways how the party was born] (in Malayalam) (3rd ed.). Chintha publishers. ISBN 9789385018329. A book that chronicles the early struggles and the growth of the Communist Party in Kerala.
- Payyannur Kunhiraman (2017). Uppu Samaram [Salt March] (in Malayalam) (1st ed.). Chintha publishers. ISBN 9789386364920. A book on Salt March.
- Payyannur Kunhiraman. Swathantgryam thanna kathakal (in Malayalam) (1st ed.). Mathrubhumi Books. ISBN 9788182655607. A children's literature work on famous events in the history of the Indian freedom struggle, such as the Wagon tragedy, the Salt March, the Guruvayur Satyagraha, the Punnapra-Vayalar uprising, and the Kayyur uprising.
- Payyannur Kunhiraman. Perumkaliyattam (in Malayalam). Green Books. ISBN 9789380884394. Essays and studies on Theyyam.
- Payyannur Kunhiraman (2008). Kaliyattakkathakal (in Malayalam) (2nd ed.). Chintha publishers. 13 folklore stories of Theyyam.
- Payyannur Kunhiraman (2008). Khadiyum swathantgryavum [Khadi and freedom] (in Malayalam). Kannur: Alfaone publishers. ISBN 9789382507758.
- Payyannur Kunhiraman (2008). Charithramsaakshyam : Rakthasaakshikalude kudumbam [A Historical Testimony: The Family of Martyrs] (in Malayalam). Kannur: Alfaone publishers. Political history.
- Payyannur Kunhiraman (2011). Vadakkinte kolaeruma The Grandeur of the North's Theyyam (in Malayalam). Kannur: Deshabhimani publishers. Book on theyyams of North Kerala.
- Payyannur Kunhiraman. Chuvanna grmam [Red village] (in Malayalam). Payyannur: Ethirdisha publishers. Political history.
- Payyannur Kunhiraman (2009). Olimangatha Onchiyam ormma [The Unfading Memory of Onchiyam] (in Malayalam). Kannur: Deshabhimani publishers. Political history.

=== Children's literature ===
- Payyannur Kunhiraman. Thengalukal [Sobbing] (in Malayalam). Mathrubhumi Books.
- Payyannur Kunhiraman. Kutty Padippicha Patam [The lesson taught by the child]. Children's literature (in Malayalam). Thrissur, Kerala, India: Green Books. ISBN 9798188582951.
- Payyannur Kunhiraman. Ottakkalan njandu [One legged crab]. Children's literature (in Malayalam). Chintha publishers. ISBN 978-81-262-0134-1.
- Payyannur Kunhiraman (2011). Veerabalinte thamashakal [Jokes by Veerbal]. Children's literature (in Malayalam). Chintha publishers. ISBN 9788126206254.

=== Translations ===
- Niranjana (2018). Banashankari (in Malayalam). Translated by Payyannur Kunhiraman (2nd ed.). Chintha publishers. ISBN 9789383903658. A Malayalam translation of the Kannada novel written by Niranjana
- Niranjana (2012). Kaveri ente raktham (in Malayalam). Translated by Payyannur Kunhiraman (1st ed.). Chintha publishers. ISBN 9789382167693. A Malayalam translation of the Kannada novel written by Niranjana, based on the life of Swami Aparampara, who died fighting against British imperialism.
- Niranjana (2021). Mrithyunjayan (in Malayalam). Translated by Payyannur Kunhiraman (2nd ed.). Chintha publishers. ISBN 9789386637666. A Malayalam translation of the Kannada novel written by Niranjana.
- Veenadhari (2006). Ente katha: oru H.I.V. badithayude atmakatha [My sory: An Autobiography of an HIV-Positive Person] (in Malayalam). Translated by Payyannur Kunhiraman. Kannur: Kairali Books. Malayalam translation of biography of HIV activist Veenadhari originally written in English.
- P.V Narayana (2000). Irulinu Neelam Koodunnu (in Malayalam). Translated by Payyannur Kunhiraman (1st ed.). Kottayam: DC Books. Malayalam translation of work of Kannada writer P. V. Narayana.
- Krushna Prasad Mishra (1981). Andhahrudayam=Simhakadi (in Malayalam). Translated by Payyannur Kunhiraman (1st ed.). Thiruvananthapuram: Prabhath Books. Malayalam translation of work of oriya writer Krushna Prasad Mishra.
- Niranjana (2007). Niranjanayute kathakal (in Malayalam). Translated by Payyannur Kunhiraman (2nd ed.). Thiruvananthapuram: Chintha publishers. Malayalam translation of stories by Niranjana.
- Anupama Niranjana (2001). Cheriyute vilapam (in Malayalam). Translated by Payyannur Kunhiraman (1st ed.). Thiruvananthapuram: Prabhath Books. ISBN 81-7705-081-8. Malayalam translation of Kannada fiction by Anupama Niranjana.
- Bharathi Sudha (2006). Edakkal malamukalil (in Malayalam). Translated by Payyannur Kunhiraman (1st ed.). Mathrubhumi Books. ISBN 81-8264-276-0. Malayalam translation of Kannada fiction by Bharathi Sudha.
- Srikrishna Alanahalli (2006). Chumar (in Malayalam). Translated by Payyannur Kunhiraman (1st ed.). Thrissur: Green Books. ISBN 81-8264-276-0. Malayalam translation of Kannada fiction by Srikrishna Alanahalli.
- Niranjana (1999). Minnal (in Malayalam). Translated by Payyannur Kunhiraman (1st ed.). Kottayam: Current Books. Malayalam translation of Kannada fiction by Niranjana.
- Niranjana (2004). Rangammayute vatakapparambu (in Malayalam). Translated by Payyannur Kunhiraman (1st ed.). Kottayam: DC Books. Malayalam translation of Kannada fiction by Niranjana.
- Mushtaq Banu (2016). Daridrante makal pennalla vatakapparambu (in Malayalam). Translated by Payyannur Kunhiraman (1st ed.). Payyannur: Pustaka Bhavan. Malayalam translation of Kannada stories by Mushtaq Banu.
- Anupama Niranjana (1999). Ghosham (in Malayalam). Translated by Payyannur Kunhiraman (1st ed.). Kottayam: Sahithya Pravarthaka Co-operative Society. Malayalam translation of Kannada fiction by Anupama Niranjana.

=== Travelogue ===
- Payyannur Kunhiraman (2008). Vijayanagram (in Malayalam) (1st ed.). Kozhikode: Mathrubhumi Books. ISBN 9788182644786.

=== Autobiography ===
- Payyannur Kunhiraman (2021). Ilayum pukayilayum nadannu theernna vazhikal [Leaves and tobacco, paths already trodden] (in Malayalam) (1st ed.). Chintha publishers. ISBN 9789393468147.

== Awards and honours ==
Payyannur Kunhiraman received the Abu Dhabi Sakthi Award in 2005. In 2020, he received the Bharat Bhavan Vivarthana Ratna Award for his translation of Banu Mushtaq's Novelettes into Malayalam. He received the Lifetime Achievement Award from the Kerala State Institute of Children's Literature in 2023. In 2025 he received the Kerala Sahitya Akademi Award for Overall Contributions for the year 2024.
