= Kunjunni Mash =

Indian poet

Kunjunni
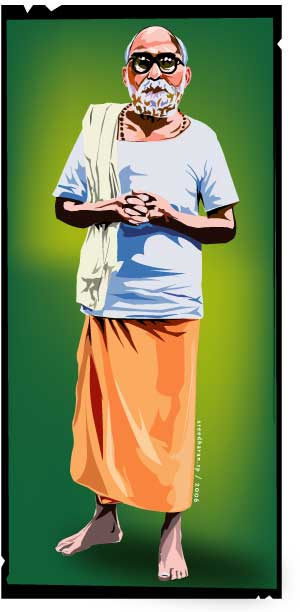
- Born: 10 May 1927; Valapad, Thrissur, Kerala, India
- Died: 26 March 2006 (aged 78); Thrissur, Kerala, India
- Occupations: Poet; lyricist
- Parents: Neelakantan Moosath (father); Narayani Amma (mother)
- Awards: 1977 Kerala Sahitya Akademi Award for Children's Literature; 1987 Kerala Sahitya Akademi Award for Poetry; 2001 Kerala Sahitya Akademi Award for Overall Contributions

Kunjunni (10 May 1927 – 26 March 2006), popularly known as Kunjunni Mash (transl. Kunjunni, The Teacher), was an Indian poet of Malayalam literature. Known for his short poems with a philosophical overtone, his works were popular among children as well as adults. He received several honors including three Kerala Sahitya Akademi Awards.

== Early life and career ==
Kunjunni was born on 10 May 1927 at Valapad, a village in Thrissur district in the south Indian state of Kerala to Njayapilly Illathu Neelakantan Moosath and Athiyarathu Narayani Amma. Kunjunni started his career as a teacher at the Chelari school. He joined Ramakrishna Mission Sevashrama High School in Kozhikode in 1953. He was an inmate of the Ashrama and taught, looked after, and interacted with the hostel boys there. He retired from teaching in 1982 but continued to live in the Ashrama, which he had found to be most suitable for his unpretentious life and writings are known for their simplicity, till he retired to his district for health reasons. Kunjunni died in his ancestral house at Valapad on 26 March 2006.

He was known for living a humble life.

== Works ==
In Cross my Belief, In Purse my Relief.........

Kaakka Paari Vannu, Paara Melirunnu (Flew in a crow, sat on the rocks)
Kaakka Paari Poyi, Paara Baakkiyaayi (Flew out the crow, stayed back the rocks)

Excerpts from Kunjunni poems

He was known for writing short poems which appeared to be childlike in form but conveyed a message. Kunjunni handled the column for children in the Mathrubhumi weekly under the pseudonym "Kuttettan". He initiated three or four generations of aspiring writers into writing. Kunjunni returned to his native village in 1987 and became involved in social and cultural activities in the Thrissur area. He appeared in Bhoomi Geetham, a 1993 film directed by Kamal. His autobiography, Enniloode, is noted for its candour, humour and simplicity. Oridathu Oridathu Oru Kunjunni Mash is a biography of the poet, written by Sippy Pallippuram.

=== Bibliography ===
- Kunjunni (1969). Kunjunniyude kavithakal. Kunjunni.
- Kunjunni; Karthikeyan, K. G., eds. (1995). Ezhuthachantae Mozhimuthukal. Calicut: Bodhi.
- Kunjunni (1978). Kunjunni kavithakal. Kottayam: National Book Stall.
- Kunjunni (1977). Kavitha. Kerala Kavitha Grandhavali.
- Kunjunni (2010). Valiya kuttikkavithakal. kottayam: D C Books. ISBN 9788126428236.
- Kunjunni (2003). Pazhamozhi pathayam. Kottayam: D C books. ISBN 9788126405954.
- Kunjunni (2011). Kunnolamvalippamulla kunju kathakal. Kottayam: DC Books. ISBN 9788126416110.
- Kunjunni (2005). Katamkathakal. Thrissur: Kerala Sahitya Academy. ISBN 9788176900768.
- Kunjunni (1992). Theranjedutha pazhanchollukal. Calicut: P K Brothers.
- Kunjunni (1971). Oonuthottu Urakkam vare. Author: Author.
- Kunjunni. Amruthakadhakal. Malayalam Publication, Kozhikode: Malayalam Publication, Kozhikode.
- Kunjunni (1984). Namboodiri Phalithangal. Kottayam. Kottayam: N.B.S.
- Kunjunni (1989). Rashtreeyam. D.C. Book House: D.C. Book House.
- Kunjunni (1986). Kunjunnimashum Kuttyolum. Alhuda Bookstall, Kozhikode: Alhuda Bookstall, Kozhikode.
- Kunjunni (2007). Kuttettan. Kottayam: D C Books.
- Kunjunni (2007). Kilukilukkampetti. Kottayam: D C Books.
- Kunjunni (2003). Adiyum Podiyum. Trichur: Currand Books.
- Kunjunni (2003). Nadatham. Kozhikode: Poorna.
- Kunjunni (2001). Kunjunnikkurippukal. Kozhikode: Oliv.
- Kunjunni (204). Kuttettande Kurippukal. Kozhikode: Lipi Publications.
- Kunjunni (1986). Kinginikavithakal. Sahitya Pravarthaka Co.op. Society Ltd., Kottayam: Sahitya Pravarthaka Co.op. Society Ltd., Kottayam.
- Kunjunni (1985). Appooppanthadi. N.B.S., Kottayam: N.B.S., Kottayam.
- Kunjunni (2015). Kuttikavithakalum kathakalum kurippukalum. Kottayam: Mambazham, DC books. ISBN 9788126453696. Archived from the original on 27 March 2019.
- kunjunni (1986). Valiyavanavan. Calicut: P.K.Brothers.
- Kunjunni (1992). Kuttammanum kottaravum. Calicut: P.K.Brothers.
- Kunjunni (2006). Kuttikalute nighandu (3rd ed.). Kottayam: D.C.Books. ISBN 9788126409693.
- Kunjunni. Nallathupole Padikkanulla Kunhu Sootrangal. Kottayam: DC Books.
- Kunjunni (2003). Kunjunni Ramayanam. Poorna Publications.
- Kunjunni (2003). Kaiyezhuthum Thalelezhuthum. H and C Books.
- Kunjunni (2014). Cheriya Kuttikkavithakal. Mambazham: An Imprint of DC Books. ISBN 978-8126427154.
- Kunjunni. Pulivaalu. DC Books.
- Kunjunni (2001). Kurum Kavithakal. H & C Books.
- Kunjunni (2004). Kunjunni Mashude Lokam. Pulari Books.
- Kunjunni (2015). Pathinanchum Pathinanchum. National Book Stall.
- Vithum Muthum
- Kutti Pencil
- Kuttikal Padunnu
- Undanum Undiyum
- Kalikoppu
- Pathinanchum Pathinanchum
- Aksharathettu
- Nonsense Kavithakal
- Muthumani
- Chakkarappava
- Kadalippazham
- Kalikkalam

== Awards ==
Kerala Sahitya Akademi selected Kunjunni for their annual award for children's literature in 1977 for his work, Aksharathettu. He received the State Institute of Children's Literature Award in 1982, followed by the Kerala Sahitya Akademi Award for Poetry in 1987. The academy honoured him again in 2001 with the Award for Overall Contributions in 2001. He received the lifetime achievement award of the State Institute of Children's Literature in 2002, the same year as he received the Vazhakunnuam Award. A year later, he was awarded the V. A. Kesavan Nair Award (2003). He was also a recipient of the Tomyas Award.

Kunjunni Award is a literary award instituted by Balasahiti Prakashan, the publication wing of Balagokulam, in memory of Kunjunni Mash. The award carries a cash prize of Rs 25,000, a plaque and a certificate.

== Feature and short films ==
- 2014: 'Mayilpeeli thundum vala pottukalum ': a docufiction, directed by Biju Meya. The character of Kunjunni Mash was portrayed by Krishnan Namboothiri.
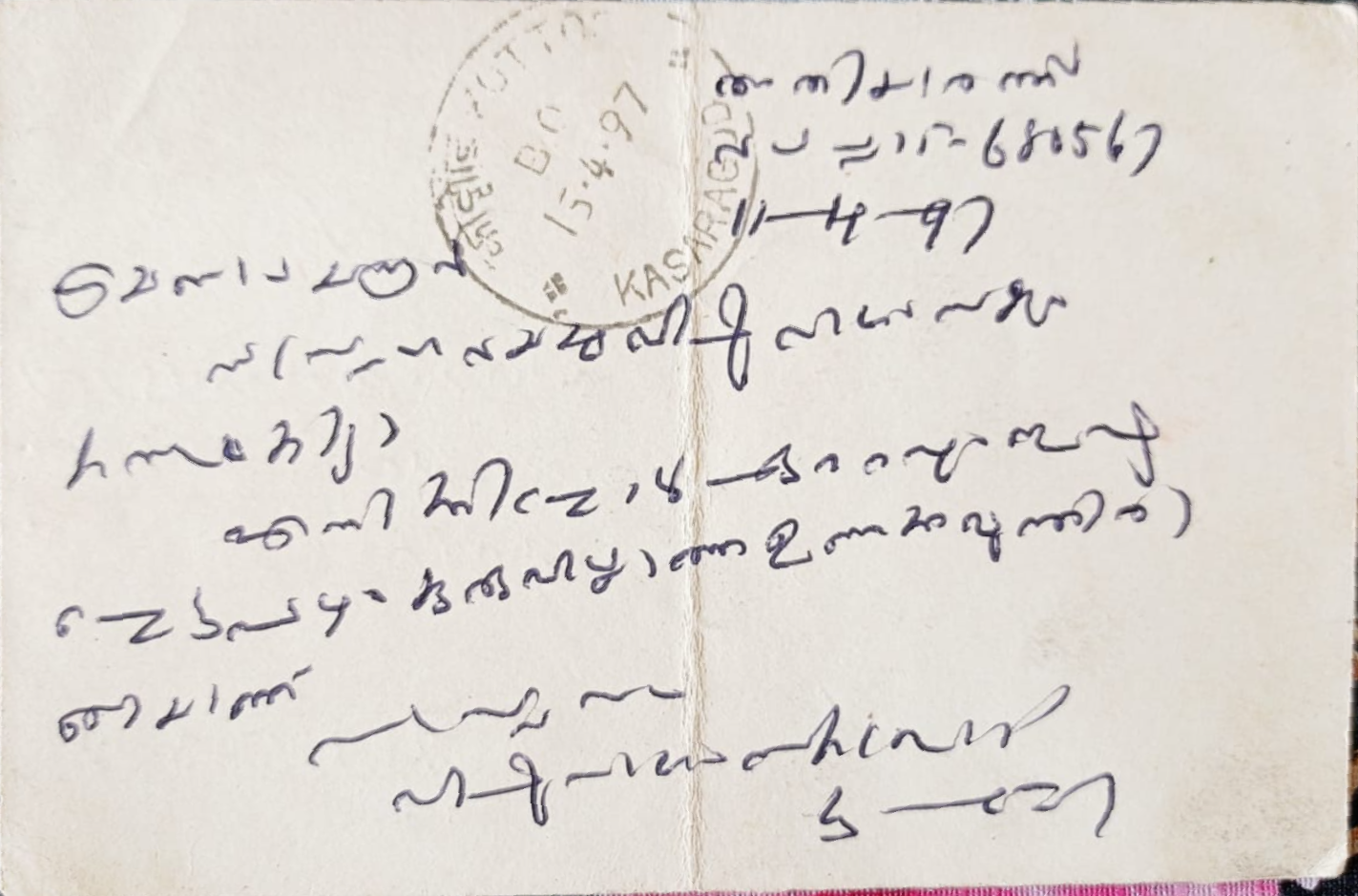
Handwriting of Kunjunni Mash, on a post card
