= Priya A. S. =

Indian writer of Malayalam literature (born 1967)

- പ്രിയ ആനന്ദവല്ലി സദാശിവൻ
- Born: Priya Anandavalli Sadashivan; 28 May 1967 (age 59); Eramalloor, Cherthala, Kerala, India
- Education: BA (English Literature), MA (Private)
- Alma mater: Maharaja's College, Ernakulam
- Occupations: Writer, translator
- Children: Tanmoy (Kunjunni)
- Relatives: Anandavalli (mother); K. R. Sadashivan Nair (father)
- Writing career
- Language: Malayalam
- Period: 1980s–present
- Genres: Short story, memoirs, children's literature, translations
- Notable awards: 2003 Lalithambika Anterjanam Award; 2004 Kerala Sahitya Akademi Award for Story; 2006 Kerala Sahitya Akademi Award for Children's Literature; 2012 Siddhartha Literary Award; 2014 Sahitya Akademi Translation Prize; 2020 Kerala Sahitya Akademi Award for Children's Literature; 2023 Sahitya Akademi Bal Sahitya Puraskar
- Movement: Post-modern

Priya A. S. (born 28 May 1967), born Priya Anandavalli Sadashivan, is an Indian writer of Malayalam literature. Her oeuvre encompasses short stories, children's literature, translations, and memoirs. She is a three-time recipient of the Kerala Sahitya Akademi Award and a recipient of the national Sahitya Akademi Translation Prize (2014) and the Sahitya Akademi Bal Sahitya Puraskar (2023).

She is best known for her translation of Arundhati Roy's Booker Prize-winning novel The God of Small Things into Malayalam, titled Kunju Karyangalude Odeythampuran. Roy herself has stated that although the novel has been translated into several languages, no other translation holds as much significance to her as the Malayalam version, as it is the language of the novel's central characters.

== Early life and education ==
She had a difficult childhood owing to recurring illnesses, which confined her to hospital stays for extended periods. She has described how the experience of illness turned her towards reading and eventually writing as a means of engaging with the world beyond her immediate circumstances.

After completing her schooling at E.C.E.K Union High School, Kuthiyathodu, she enrolled at Maharaja's College, Ernakulam, where she graduated with a degree in English literature.

== Career ==
=== Administrative career ===
Priya worked in administrative positions at Mahatma Gandhi University before joining Cochin University of Science and Technology (CUSAT) in Kochi, where she served for over two decades. She retired from CUSAT in 2023 as a section officer.

=== Literary career ===
Priya entered the Malayalam literary scene during her college years at Maharaja's College, Ernakulam, through short stories published in prominent Malayalam magazines. Her initial works appeared in the children's section of Mathrubhumi, including the story "Achan", which was later featured in Mathrubhumi Weekly. Senior students studying MA Malayalam at her college hostel recognized her from her children's magazine stories and offered encouragement, which she has credited as an early source of confidence.

Her debut short story anthology, Ororo Thirivukal (Various Turns), was published in 1994, marking the formal beginning of her literary career. Her subsequent collection, Manjamarangal Chuttilum (Yellow Trees All Around), published in 2002 by DC Books, compiled several of her stories exploring family dynamics and emotional currents in everyday life.

=== Short fiction ===
Her notable collections include Enthuppatti Ente Neelappoovinu (2008), Jagarooka (2015 edition; originally awarded in 2004), Pookkathirikkan Enikkavathille, and Violet Poochakalku Soo Vaikaan Thonnumpol (2017). Her stories frequently address themes of childhood experiences, women's lives, family bonds, societal pressures, and the inner worlds of individuals navigating difficult circumstances.

=== Translations ===
Her most celebrated translation was Kunju Karyangalude Odeythampuran, the Malayalam rendering of Arundhati Roy's The God of Small Things, and the Malayalam translation of Jaishree Misra’s acclaimed English novel Ancient Promises. Set in Kerala and dealing with themes of caste, forbidden love, and social taboos, the translation was praised for its authentic integration of local idioms and rhythmic patterns. Roy endorsed the translation as the most significant among all language editions of the novel. The translation earned Priya the Sahitya Akademi Translation Prize in 2014. The award, consisting of a cash prize of ₹50,000, a plaque, and a shawl, was presented during a ceremony on 4 September 2015 at the Rang Ghar auditorium in Dibrugarh University, Assam, where 24 translators from various Indian languages were honoured.

Her other significant translation work is Janmanthara Vagdhanangal (2001), the Malayalam version of Jaishree Misra's Ancient Promises (1999), also published by DC Books. The novel, which traces a woman's journey through arranged marriage, separation, and self-realization, addresses conflicts between tradition and modernity. Priya's translation of this work received the V. K. Unnikrishnan Smaraka Award for its sensitive handling of psychological nuances and cultural contexts.

=== Children's literature ===
Children's literature forms a substantial and acclaimed portion of Priya's body of work. She has stated that her entry into children's writing was unplanned, beginning with Chithrasalabhangalude Veedu (House of Painted Butterflies, 2008), published by DC Books. The work centres on a butterfly named Chitra, exploring life's lessons through the creature's journey in a natural setting, using the butterfly's adventures as a metaphor for personal discovery and environmental harmony. The collection won the Kerala Sahitya Akademi Award for Children's Literature in 2006.

When her son Tanmoy was young, she captured his childhood in the collection Ammem Kunjunneem Kunjunneem Ammem, which received widespread recognition and won the Siddhartha Literary Award in 2012.

Her most celebrated children's work is the novel Perumazhayathe Kunjithalukal (The Children Who Never Withered), published on 1 November 2018 by Poorna Publications as part of the Sammanapothi series edited by K. Sreekumar. The novel was inspired by the 2018 Kerala floods. While working at CUSAT during the floods, Priya witnessed the relief camps set up on campus by the university's Department of Instrumentation, where she observed children from diverse backgrounds displaying resilience and unity in the face of the natural disaster. She has stated that her original story idea was entirely transformed by the experience of the floods, and every life she observed at the relief camp became an inspiration for the novel. The novel's publication marked the inauguration of the children's literature section on IE Malayalam, the Malayalam news portal of The Indian Express.

Perumazhayathe Kunjithalukal won the Kerala Sahitya Akademi Award for Children's Literature in 2020 and the national Sahitya Akademi Bal Sahitya Puraskar in 2023, which carries a cash prize of ₹50,000 and an engraved copper plaque. The Malayalam jury for the 2023 award comprised Dr Paul Manalil, Mundoor Sethumadhavan, and B. S. Rajeev, who selected her novel from among ten recommended works.

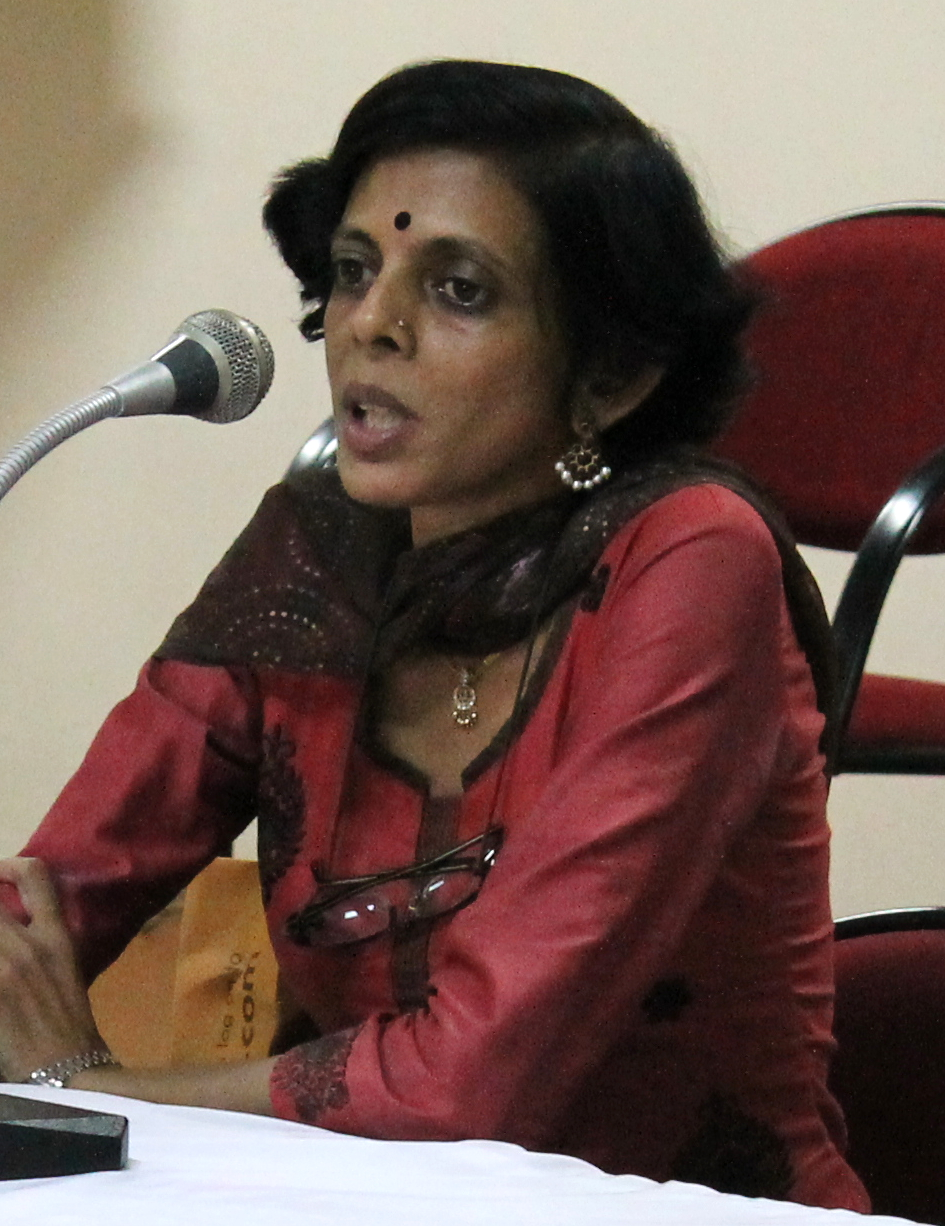
Priya in 2013.

== Personal life ==
Priya has a son, Tanmoy, also known as Kunjunni. Following her retirement from CUSAT in 2023, she resides in her ancestral home at Eramalloor in Alappuzha district.

== Bibliography ==
=== Short story anthologies ===
Title	Year	Publisher	Notes
Manjamarangal Chuttilum	2002	DC Books, Kottayam	ISBN 978-8126405190; won Lalithambika Anterjanam Award (2003)
Enthuppatti Ente Neelappoovinu	2008	DC Books	ISBN 978-81-264-1930-2
Jagarooka	2015	Poorna Publications	ISBN 9788130016931; won Kerala Sahitya Akademi Award for Story (2004)
Ormmayanu Njan	2016	DC Books	ISBN 978-8126466894
Parippu Jeevitham	2016	Kelkkam Audio Books	ISBN 9780000104830 (audio book)
Violet Poochakalku Soo Vaikaan Thonnumpol	2017	Mathrubhumi	ISBN 978-81-8266-754-9

=== Translations ===
Title	Original work	Original author	Year	Publisher
Janmanthara Vagdhanangal	Ancient Promises (1999)	Jaishree Misra	2001	DC Books
Kunju Karyangalude Odeythampuran	The God of Small Things (1997)	Arundhati Roy	2011	DC Books

=== Children's literature ===
Title	Year	Publisher	Notes
Chithrasalabhangalude Veedu	2008	DC Books	ISBN 978-81-264-0994-5; Kerala Sahitya Akademi Award (2006)
Ammem Kunjunnim Mookkurummi Mookkurummi	2017	Mathrubhumi	ISBN 978-81-8266-754-9
Tha Enna Aniyathikutty	2017	Poorna Publications	ISBN 9788130019529
Perumazhayathe Kunjithalukal	2018	Poorna Publications	ISBN 978-8130021171; Kerala Sahitya Akademi Award (2020); Sahitya Akademi Bal Sahitya Puraskar (2023)
Oru Bhoomi Oru Veedu Oru Thankakkutti	2026	Mathrhubhumi Books	ISBN 9789359628578

=== Memoirs ===
Title	Year	Publisher	Notes
Maayakkaazhchakal	2006	DC Books	ISBN 9788126408108
Katha Bakki	2007	DC Books	ISBN 978-8126415557
Fantas Minta	2017	Green Books	ISBN 978-9386440815

== Awards and honours ==
Year	Award	Awarded for	Awarding body
2003	Lalithambika Anterjanam Award (Best Young Woman Writer)	Manjamarangal Chuttilum	Kerala Sahitya Akademi
2004	Kerala Sahitya Akademi Award for Story	Jagarooka	Kerala Sahitya Akademi
2006	Kerala Sahitya Akademi Award for Children's Literature	Chithrasalabhangalude Veedu	Kerala Sahitya Akademi
--	Kerala Sahitya Akademi Endowment (Sri Padmanabhaswamy Endowment for Children's Literature)	Chithrasalabhangalude Veedu	Kerala Sahitya Akademi
--	S.B.I. Literary Award		State Bank of India
--	V. K. Unnikrishnan Smaraka Award (Translation)	Janmanthara Vagdhanangal	
--	Grihalakshmi Award		Grihalakshmi (Mathrubhumi Group)
--	Ankanam Sahitya Award		
--	Ramu Kariat Award		
2012	Siddhartha Literary Award	Ammem Kunjunneem Kunjunneem Ammem	
2014	Sahitya Akademi Translation Prize	Kunju Karyangalude Odeythampuran	Sahitya Akademi
2020	Kerala Sahitya Akademi Award for Children's Literature	Perumazhayathe Kunjithalukal	Kerala Sahitya Akademi
2023	Sahitya Akademi Bal Sahitya Puraskar	Perumazhayathe Kunjithalukal	Sahitya Akademi

== See also ==
- List of Malayalam-language authors by category
- List of Malayalam-language authors
- Kerala Sahitya Akademi Award for Children's Literature
- Sahitya Akademi Translation Prize
