= 2010 Kerala Sahitya Akademi Awards =

Indian literary awards

Kerala Sahitya Akademi Award
- Awarded for: Outstanding books of literary merit
- Date: 6 January 2011
- Location: Thrissur
- Country: India
- Presented by: Kerala Sahitya Akademi
- First award: 1958

The 2010 Kerala Sahitya Akademi Award was announced on 6 January 2011.The award has been given each year since 1958 by the Kerala Literary Academy, to a Malayalam writer for an outstanding book of literary merit.

== Winners ==
Category	Recipient	Work
Poetry	Mullanezhi	Kavitha
Novel	Khadija Mumtaz	Barsa
Story	E. P. Sreekumar	Parasya Sareeram
Drama	A. Santha Kumar	Maram Peyyunnu
Literary criticism	M. R. Chandrasekharan	Malayala Novel: Innum Innaleyum
Autobiography/Biography	Dr. P. K. R. Warrier	Anubhavangal Anubhaavangal
Travelogue	Musafir Ahammed	Marubhoomiyude Athmakatha
Humour	C. R. Omanakuttan	Sree Bhoothanathavilasam Nair Hotel
Scholarly literature	T. Pradeep	Kunjukanangalkku Vasantham
Sree Padmanabhaswamy Award for Children's literature	Sumangala	Nadannu Theeratha Vazhikal
Translation	Asha Latha	Adinte Virunnu

== Endowments ==
- I. C. Chacko Award: P. Sreekumar (Adhvanam, Bhasha, Vimochanam)
- C. B. Kumar Award: Hameed Chennamangaloor (Oru Mathanirapekshavadiyude Swathanthra Chinthakal)
- K.R. Namboodiri Award: Dr. P. V. Ramankutty (Yajurveda Sameeksha)
- Kanakasree Award: Soorya Binoy (Nizhalppura)
- Geetha Hiranyan Award: Susmesh Chandroth (Swarna Mahal)
- G. N. Pillai Award: K. Babu Joseph (Apekshikathayude 100 Varsham)
- Kuttipuzha Award: Dr. N. M. Namboothiri (Kakkad: Kaviyum Kavithayum)
