= T. K. D. Muzhappilangad =

Indian author (1946–2026)

T.K. Damodaran
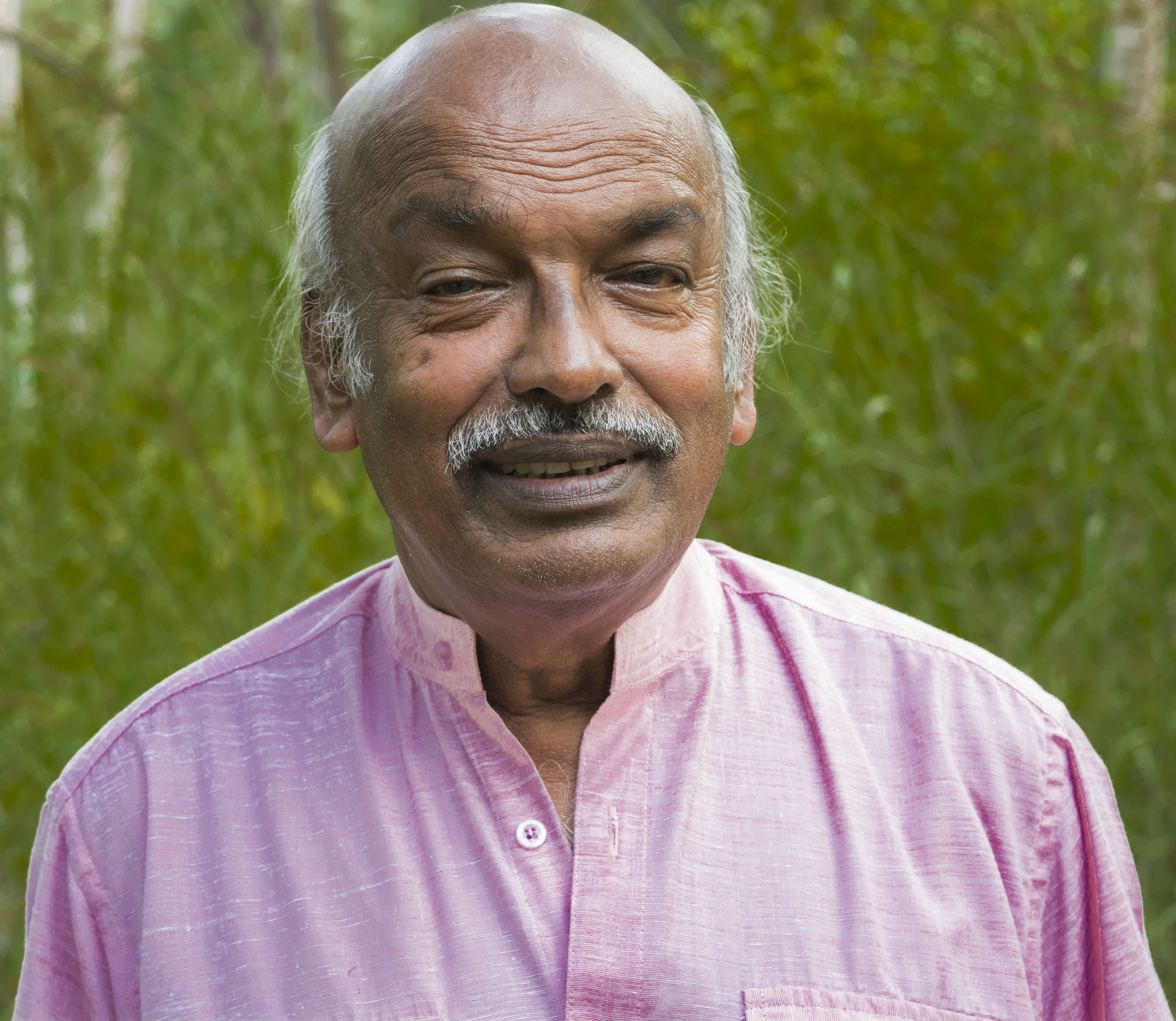
- Born: 1946; Muzhappilangad, Malabar District, Madras Province, British India
- Died: 27 August 2026 (aged 80); Kozhikode, Kerala, India
- Occupation: Author
- Writing career
- Pen name: T.K.D. Muzhappilangad
- Genres: Novels, screenplay, children's literature
- Notable awards: Kerala Sahitya Akademi Award for Children's Literature

T. K. Damodaran (1946 – 27 August 2026), popularly known as T. K. D. Muzhappilangad, was an Indian author, screenplay writer, critic and orator.

== Life and career ==
Muzhappilangad was born in Muzhappilangad, a coastal village in Madras Province in 1946. Besides children's literature he wrote four novels, sixteen essays on various subjects, five biographies and five plays.

He was a children's story writer in Malayalam, who won several awards including Kerala Sahitya Akademi Award. His book Unnikkuttanum kadhakaliyum received the Kerala Sahitya Akademi Award for Children's Literature in 1983.

On 18 August 2026, Muzhappilangad was seriously injured after being hit by a van while crossing a road towards his residence. He died from his injuries at a hospital in Kozhikode, on 27 August, aged 80.
