= V. R. Sudheesh =

Malayalam–language short story writer

V. R. Sudhessh
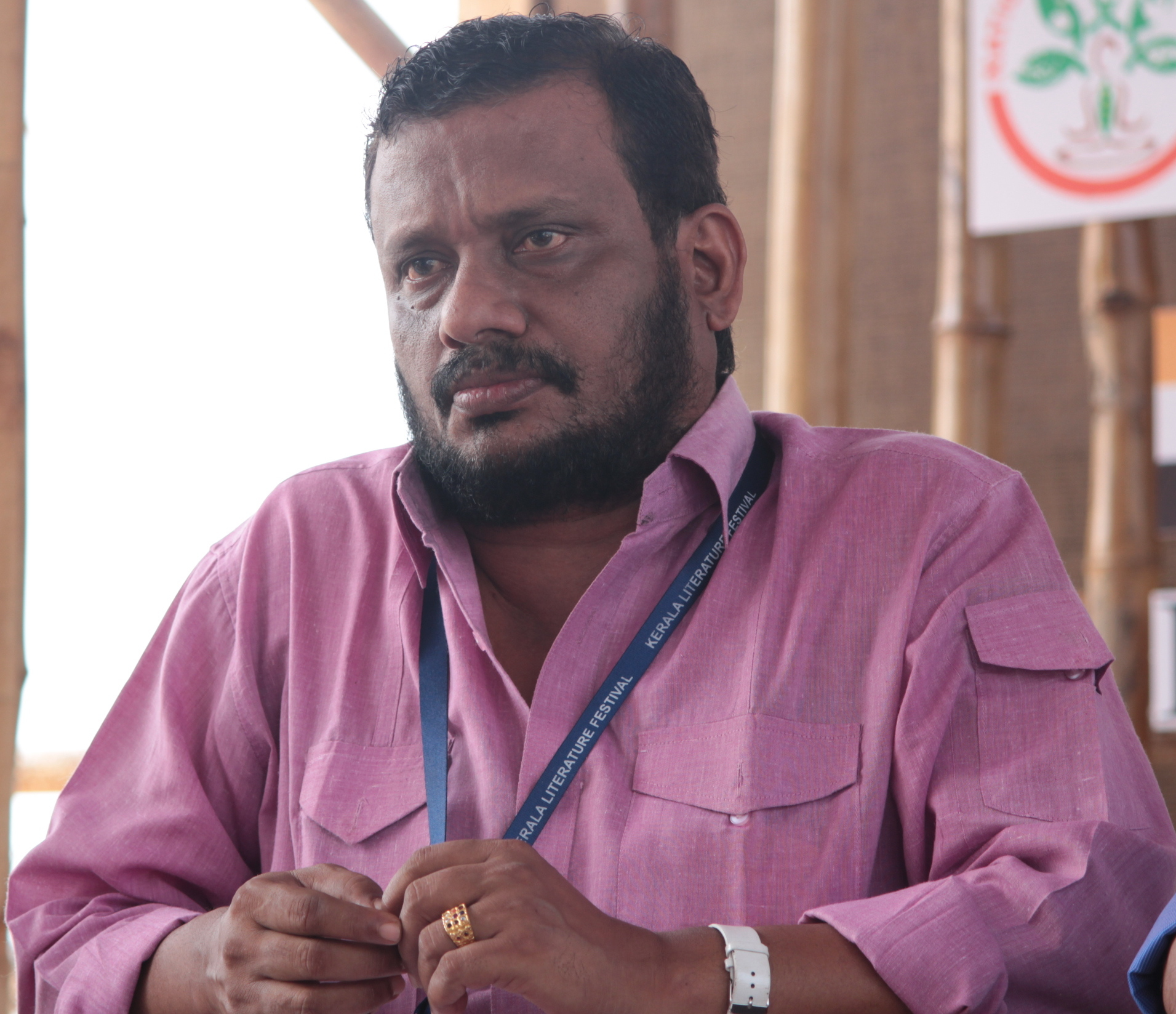
- Sudhessh in 2017
- Born: Vadakara, Kerala, India
- Education: Farook College
- Occupations: Writer, screenwriter, translator, academic
- Awards: 2014 Kerala Sahitya Akademi Award for Story; 2017 Kerala Sahitya Akademi Award for Children's Literature

V. R. Sudheesh is an Indian writer, screenwriter, translator and academic, who writes in Malayalam. He is a two-time recipient of the Kerala Sahithya Akademi Award.

== Life ==
Sudheesh was born in Vadakara near Kozhikode in the south Indian state of Kerala. He did his pre degree from farook college and graduated in history from Madappally Government College and earned an MA in Malayalam literature from Government Brennen College, Tellicherry. He has completed M.Phil. from Madras University. Subsequently, He became a teacher in colleges under SN Trust. and retired from service as the principal of Sree Narayana Guru College, Chelannoor in 2018. The writer was booked for insulting and threatening a Kozhikode-based woman publisher in June 2022.

== Literary career ==
Sudheesh started writing at a very young age and his early works were published in the children's column of Mathrubhumi Weekly and later in Chandrika Weekly and Deshabhimani Weekly.

== Awards ==
Sudheesh received the Kerala State Television Award for screenplay in 2005. His short story anthology, Bhavana Bhedanam fetched him the Kerala Sahitya Akademi Award for Story in 2014. Three years later, he received the 2017 Kerala Sahitya Akademi Award for Children's Literature for his work, Kurukkan Mashinte School and in 2020, he was awarded the Thoppil Ravi Award for the work, Kadukkachi Manga. He is also a recipient of C. V. Sreeraman Award, T. V. Kochubawa Award and Bheema Bala Sahitya Award. In 2020, he received the Abu Dhabi Sakthi Award in story category for his work Kadukkachi Manga.

== List of works ==
=== Fiction ===
- Sudheesh, V. R. Priyappetta Kathakal (in Malayalam). DC Books. Archived from the original on 1 February 2021.
- Sudheesh, V. R. (2020). Kadukkachi Maanga. Mathrubhumi Books. p. 100. ISBN 9789390234691.
- Sudheesh, V. R. (2019). Ente Pranaya Kathakal. Mathrubhumi Books. p. 164. ISBN 9788182679702.
- Sudheesh, V. R. (2018). Sreekrishnan. Mathrubhumi Books. p. 100. ISBN 9788182675124.
- Sudheesh, V. R. (2018). Ente Gramakathakal. Olive Publications. p. 184. ISBN 9789387334144.
- Sudheesh, V. R. (2018). Maya. DC Books. p. 72. ISBN 9789352821723.
- Sudheesh, V. R. (2017). Ksheerapatham. Logos Books. p. 118. ISBN 9789386744012.
- Sudheesh, V. R. (2017). Vakkukal Sangeethamakunna Kalam Varunnundu. Sapiens Literature. p. 200. ISBN 9788193421307.
- Sudheesh, V. R. (2017). Oru Valarthu Poochayude Jeevithakatha. Olive Publications. p. 86. ISBN 9789385288999.
- Sudheesh, V. R. Puli. DC Books. p. 100.
- Sudheesh, V. R. Priyappetta Kathakal. DC Books. p. 120.
- Sudheesh, V. R. (2015). Swathanthriathinu Vayassakunnu. Chintha Publications. p. 140. ISBN 9789385018947.
- Sudheesh, V. R. Kathakal - V R Sudheesh I. National Book Stall. p. 350. ISBN 9788182664906.
- Sudheesh, V. R. Kathakal - V R Sudheesh II. National Book Stall. p. 400.
- Sudheesh, V. R. (2014). Cheriya Cheriya Kathakal. Olive Publications. p. 130. ISBN 9789383756384.
- Sudheesh, V. R. (2011). Bhavanabhedanam. Mathrubhumi Books. p. 100.
- Sudheesh, V. R. (2013). Vamsanantharathalamura. Mathrubhumi Books. p. 96. ISBN 9788182656437.
- Sudheesh, V. R. (2019). Pranayapadangal. DC Books. p. 216. ISBN 978-9352826285.
- Sudheesh, V. R. (2013). Madhyashala. Olive Publications. p. 178. ISBN 978-9382934479.
- Sudheesh, V. R. (2014). Daivathinte Oru Poovu. Progress Publishers. ISBN 978-8192812694.
- Sudheesh, V. R. (2014). Ente Priya Novelettukal. Olive Publications. p. 170. ISBN 978-9383756407.
- Sudheesh, V. R. "Thiranjedutha Kathakal". www.indulekha.com. Archived from the original on 1 February 2021.
- Sudheesh, V. R. Kroora Phalithakkaran Daivam.
- Sudheesh, V. R. Cholamarappathakal.
- Sudheesh, V. R. Vimathalaingikam.
- Sudheesh, V. R. Oru Ezhuthukari Ariyunnu.
- Sudheesh, V. R. Rajavinte Meenukal.
- Sudheesh, V. R. Thiyyakuttikal Innum Vicharikkunnu.
- Sudheesh, V. R. Sankadamaram.
- Sudheesh, V. R. Katha Parayum Katha Maman.
- Sudheesh, V. R. Marakkoottangalkkidayile Nananja Mannu.
- Sudheesh, V. R. Sudheeshinte Kathakal.

=== Children's literature ===
- Sudheesh, V. R. (2016). Kurukkan Mashinte School. Mathrubhumi Books. ISBN 9788182667709.
- Sudheesh, V. R. (2018). Ambilippootham. Olive Publications. p. 164. ISBN 9789387334403.

=== Non-fiction ===
- Sudheesh, V. R. Ottakkadhapadanangal (in Malayalam). DC Books. Archived from the original on 1 February 2021.
- Sudheesh, V. R. Aathmaganam (Memoirs) (in Malayalam). DC Books. Archived from the original on 3 February 2021.
- Sudheesh, V. R. Alliyambalkkadavu (in Malayalam). DC Books. Archived from the original on 7 February 2021.
- Sudheesh, V. R. (2010). Anubhavam Orma Yathra. Olive Books.
- Sudheesh, V. R. (1997). Novel Velichangal. Poorna Publications.
- Sudheesh, V. R. (2017). Enne Nee Eppozhum Kanunna Pole. Olive Publications. p. 240. ISBN 9780000102041.
- Sudheesh, V. R. (2010). Ezhuthiya Kalam. Mathrubhumi Books. p. 96. ISBN 9788182648418.
- Sudheesh, V. R., ed. (2016). Malayalathinte Pranayakathakal. DC Books. ASIN B01MY6UXVW.
- Sudheesh, V. R. (2014). Kathantharam. National Book Stall. p. 198. ISBN 978-0000196323.
- Sudheesh, V. R. (2012). Sambhashanangal - M T and V R Sudheesh. Olive Publications. ISBN 978-9382934288.
- Sudheesh, V. R. (2017). Oru Valarthu Poochayute Jeevitha Katha. Olive Publications. ASIN B07GPRTGC4.
- Sudheesh, V. R., ed. (2014). Malayalathinte Pranayakavithakal. DC Books. p. 207.
- Sudheesh, V. R. (2011). Pranayachandrakantham. Olive Publications. ISBN 978-9381788004.
- Sudheesh, V. R. Samudra Vipanchika.
- Sudheesh, V. R. (ed.). Pranayapusthakom.
- Sudheesh, V. R. (ed.). Sambhashanam.
- Sudheesh, V. R. (ed.). Kathakal: Pranayathinte, Maranathinteyum.
