= S. Sivadas =

Indian children's writer

Prof. S. Sivadas
- എസ്. ശിവദാസ്
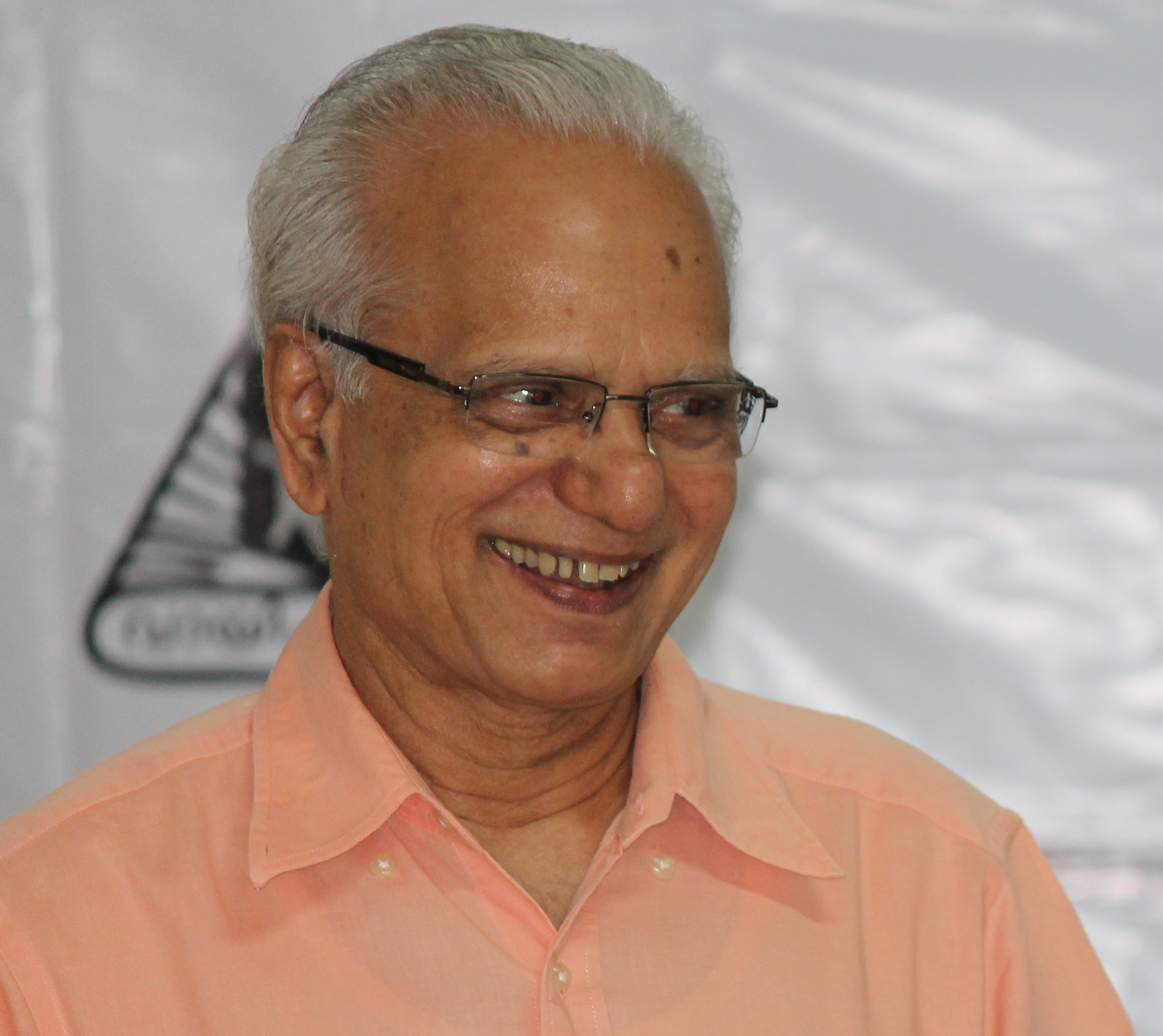
- Born: 19 February 1940 (age 86)
- Education: MSc. Chemistry
- Alma mater: CMS College Kottayam
- Occupations: Writer, teacher
- Writing career
- Language: Malayalam

S. Sivadas (born 19 February 1940) is an Indian children's writer in Malayalam. He is the author of around 200 books which include popular science, contemporary ecology, short stories, novels and other fictional stories with an emphasis on scientific outlook. He was a chemistry professor at CMS College Kottayam. He is a three-time recipient of the Kerala Sahitya Akademi Award.

== Biography ==
Sivadas was born on 19 February 1940 in Ullala village near Vaikom in Kottayam district of Kerala. He was a professor at CMS College Kottayam from 1962 to 1995. He was the founder secretary of the Kottayam district committee of Kerala Sasthra Sahithya Parishad. He edited the Malayalam magazines Eureka, Sasthra Keralam, Balasastram, Engane Engane and Labour India. He also served as the chairman of Parishad's publication division, consulting editor of Sarvavijnanakosam, and the chairman of the Chemistry Post Graduate Board of Studies at Mahatma Gandhi University.

== Awards ==
- 1974: Kerala Sahitya Akademi Award for Children's Literature – Rasatantra Kathakal
- 1997: Kerala Sahitya Akademi Award for Travelogue – Munichile Sundarikalum Sundaranmarum
- 2000: Kerala State Institute of Children's Literature's C. G. Santhakumar_Award – Overall contribution
- 2007: Kerala Sahitya Akademi Award for Children's Literature – Pustaka Kalikal
- 2015: Kendra Sahitya Akademi Award for Children's Literature – Overall contribution
- 2014: P. T. Bhaskara Panicker Emeritus Fellowship
- 2021: Tata Trusts's Big Little Book Award – Overall contribution

== Selected works ==
- Niagara Muthal Sahara Vare
- Carbon Enna Mantrikan
- Jayikkan Padikkam
- Sastra Kalikal
- Kadankathakal Kondu Kalikkam
- Puthiya Sastra Viseshangal
- Padikkan Padikkam
- Bau Bau Kathakal
- Ningalude Makkale Engane Midukkanmarakkam
- Kanjeem Cureem Kalikkam
- Kuttikalude Science Projectukal
- Padana Projectukal: Oru Vazhikatti
- Sasyalokam Albuthalokam
- Pustaka Kalikal
- Kuttikalkk Moonnu Natakangal
- Keeyo Keeyo
- Munichile Sundarikalum Sundaranmarum
- Ganitavum Sastravum Padikkendathengane
- Mathan Mannira Case
- Galileo
- Pustaka Malakhayude Katha
- Kuttikalude Science Kit
- Nani Ammayude Aduppu
- Swargathinte Thakkol
- 101 Sastra Lekhanangal
- Aara Mama Ee Viswanammavan
- Oru Bhranthan Kandalinte Kathu
- Rasatantra Sagaram
- Rasatantra Kathakal
- Prakriti Ammayude Albutha Lokathil
- Koottaymayude Suvisesham
- Vayichalum Vayichalum Teeratha Pustakam
- Orayiram Kokkukalum Oru Santhipravum
- Valarunna Sastram
- Oru Madhura Mambazhakatha
- Randu Kantharikuttikal Agniparvathathil
- Manya Madam Curie Aya Katha
- Sachinum Koottarum Padipicha Vijaya Mantrangal
