= Muhamma Ramanan =

Indian children's writer (1942–2020)

- Born: Chidambaran K. 18 February 1942; Muhamma, Alappuzha district, Kerala
- Died: 13 April 2020 (aged 78)
- Occupation: Writer
- Spouse: Shailaja
- Children: Aneesh, Abhilash, Athulya
- Writing career
- Genre: Children's literature

Muhamma Ramanan (1942 – April 2020) was a Malayalam language children's literature writer from Kerala, India. His book named Kannan kakkayute kaushalangal (meaning: Kannan kakka's Strategies) has won the Kerala Sahitya Akademi Award for Children's Literature. He is the author of around forty books in the genres of children's literature, novels and psychology.

His children's novel Komunniyute dukham (meaning: Komunni's Sadness) has autobiographical elements. He portrayed his home and surroundings in many of his books, such as Kannan kakkayute kaushalangal. In books like Abhiyute anweshanam (meaning: Abhi's Investigation) and Anuvum kuttichathanum (meaning: Anu and Kuttichathan), he portrayed his own children.

== Personal life ==
Muhamma Ramanan was born Chidambaran K on 18 February 1942, in Muhamma, Alappuzha district to Velikkakath veettil Kunjikkuttan and Kalikkutty. He studied at Muhamma CMS LP School, Aryakkara Middle School, Kanichukulangara High School and Alappuzha SD College. He began his career as a last Grade employee in the Secretariat and retired from the service as a Village Officer. He has also worked as a teacher in local tuition centers. He died on 12 April 2020, in Muhamma.

== Books ==
- Kallan Kunjappan (English meaning: Kunjappan the thief)
- Maniyan poochakk mani ketti (English meaning: Tied the bell to Maniyan cat)
- Kannan kakkayute kaushalangal (3 parts) (English meaning: Tricks of Kannan crow)
- Ashtavakran
- Choonda (English meaning: Bait)
- Gulumalu Kuttappan
- Marmmani moosa
- Abhiyute kuttanweshanam part 1- Kalavu poya pena (English meaning: Abhi's investigation- The lost pen)
- Abhiyute kuttanweshanam part 2- Kalavupoya mothiram (English meaning: Abhi's investigation- The lost ring)
- Abhiyute kuttanweshanam part 3- Anchu roopa nottu (English meaning: Abhi's investigation- 5 Ruppee)
- Anuvum kuttichatanum
- Mandan Moitheen
- Pusthakam valarthiya kutty
- Unnimonum kuruvikalum (English meaning: Unnimon and the sparrows)
- Komunniyute dukham
- Maram sancharikkunna manthram
- Kiliyudeswapnam (English meaning: Dream of a bird)
- Swaathanthrayam janmavakasham (English meaning: Freedom is birthright)
- Muthassane marakkaruth (English meaning: Don't forget grandpa)
- Kannan kakka
- Maniyan poochayum chundeliyum
- Kallanum poleesum (English meaning: Thief and the police)
- Ezham kadalinnakkare
- Kuttikalude sakhav (Book on life of P. Krishna Pillai)
- Thyagam nalkiya swarggam
- Kusruthi kakka (English meaning: Naughty crow)
- Hridayaluvaya bhootham
- Kombananayum katturumbum
- A boy's heaven (Only book in English)
- Kuttikale engane salswabhaavikalaayi valartham (English meaning: How to raise children to be good-natured)
- 40 kazhinja daampathyam
- Kalavu poya camera (English meaning: Stolen camera)

== Awards ==
- 1989: Kannan kakkayude kaushalangal - Kerala Sahitya Akademi Award
- 1990: Choonda-Uroob Memorial Award
- 1993: Anuvum Kuttichathanum - P. Narendranath Award of Thiruvananthapuram Beam
- 1996: Pusthakam valarthiya kutti - Chaitanya's Bhima Children's Literature Award
- 1961: Mampazham (Story) - First prize in the story competition conducted by Mathrubhumi Weekly Balapankthi
- 1968: Kallan Kunjappan - NBS Children's Prize
- 2007: Abu Dhabi Sakthi Award in Children's literature category
