= Sippy Pallippuram =

Indian writer

Sippy Pallipuram
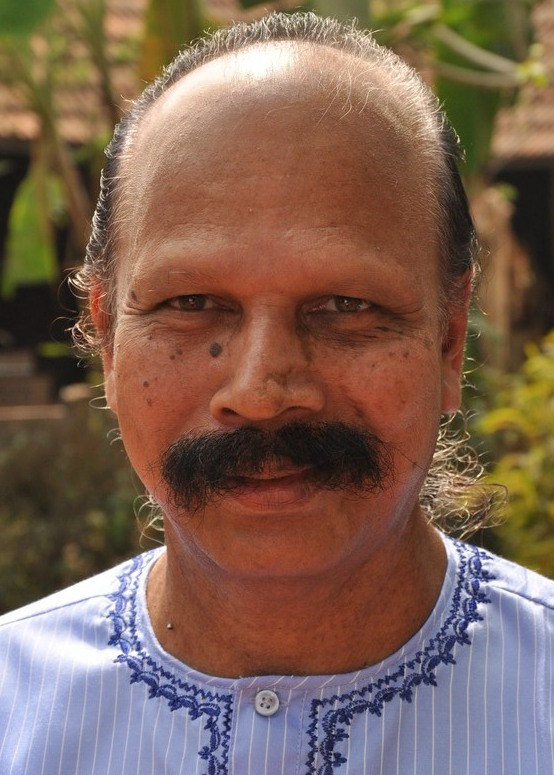
- Sippy Pallippuram
- Born: 18 May 1943 (age 83); Pallippuram, Ernakulam, Kerala, India
- Occupation: Writer
- Writing career
- Notable works: Unnikalkku Noottiyettu Gurudeva Kathakal; Oridathoru Kunjunni; Thathakalude Gramam; Appuppan Thadiyude Swarga Yathra; Pooram
- Notable awards: Kerala Sahitya Akademi Endowment; 2010 Kerala Sahitya Akademi Award for Children's Literature; 2013 Kendra Sahitya Akademi Award for Children's Literature

Sippy Pallippuram is an Indian writer of children's literature in Malayalam who has won several awards including Kendra Sahitya Akademi Award and Kerala Sahitya Akademi Award.

== Works ==
His novel about the memories of Kunjunni Mash Oridathoru Kunjunni won the national award for children's literature by Kendra Sahitya Akademi. His book Unnikalkku Noottiyettu Gurudeva Kathakal received the Kerala Sahitya Akademi Award for Children's Literature in 2013. A teacher by profession, he has over 80 (as of 2008) poetries and stories to his credit in the children's category of Malayalam literature. Sippy has been into children's literature for more than four decades.

He is a native of Pallippuram, Vypeen, Ernakulam, Kerala, and was born on 18 May 1943 in a Latin Catholics of Malabar family and belongs to the Diocese of Kottapuram.

List of awards Sippy has received over the years

Year	Book	Award
2013	Unnikalkku Noottiyettu Gurudeva Kathakal	Kerala Sahitya Akademi Award
2010	Oridathoru Kunjunni	Kendra Sahitya Akademi
1988	Thathakalude Gramam	Kairalee Children's Book Trust Award
	Appuppan Thadiyude Swarga Yathra	Kerala Sahitya Akademi Endowment
	Pooram	Bheema Children's Literature Award
	Thathakalude Gramam	Thrissur Sahrudaya Vedi Award
