= Malayath Appunni =

Indian poet

- Born: 15 August 1943 (age 83); Tirur, Malappuram, Kerala, India
- Occupation: Writer
- Writing career
- Genres: Poetry, children's literature

Malayath Appunni (born 15 August 1943) is a Malayalam language poet and children's writer from Kerala, India. Born in Thekken Kuttoor in Tirur, Malappuram district, Appunni writes simple poetry. He has won the Kerala Sahitya Akademi Award and the Sahitya Akademi Award for Malayalam Writers in 2019.

== Works ==
=== Poems ===
- Aravu Madukal
- Thekkottulla Theevandi
- Karthika Nakshatram
- Nhaval Pazhangal
- Puzhakkarayil
- Pachilayude Chiri

=== Children's literature ===
- Kazhcha Bungalow
- Nirangal
- Thenthullikal
- Velicham
- Panchara Mittayi
- Panchavarnakkilikal
- Kunhikkuttanum Koottukaranum
- Kunhan Kurukkan
- Kittuppanikker

== Awards ==
- Award by Kerala State Institute for Children's Literature (1997) for Thenthullikal
- Kerala Sahitya Akademi Award for Children's Literature (1998) for Kambilikuppayam
- Kerala Sahitya Akademi Award for Overall Contributions for his overall contributions to Malayalam literature (2010)
- Krishna Geethi Poetry Prize (2010) for Pachilayude Chiri
- Kendra Sahitya Akademi Award for Children's Literature (2019) for overall contributions.
- Kunjunni Award (2024)
- Moodadi Award
- Akshara Kalari Award
