= E. N. Sheeja =

Indian children's writer

- Born: Malappuram district, Kerala
- Occupations: Short story writer, novelist
- Spouse: Ponmala V. Vinod
- Children: 2
- Writing career
- Notable work: Amma Manamulla Kanivukal
- Notable awards: Kerala Sahitya Akademi Award for Children's Literature (2024); Award from Kerala State Institute of Children's Literature (2020 and 2022); Kerala State Council for Science, Technology and Environment's award for the best children's literature work (2011); Joseph Mundassery Award from Department of Education, Government of Kerala

E. N. Sheeja is an Indian Malayalam language writer from Kerala, primarily writes in the genre children's literature. She received many awards including awards from Kerala State Institute of Children's Literature, Kerala Sahitya Akademi Award for Children's Literature, Kerala State Council for Science, Technology and Environment's award for the best children's literature work and the Joseph Mundassery Award from Department of Education, Government of Kerala.

== Biography ==
Sheeja was born in Munduparampu, Malappuram district, Kerala. She is a teacher by profession and currently serves as a Senior Malayalam Teacher at Irumbuzhy Government Higher Secondary School. She had also worked as the primary teacher at Pookkottur Higher Secondary School. She is married to Ponmala V. Vinod, who is also an educator, and the couple has two children, Ardra and Adithyan.

== Literary career ==
Sheeja has authored over 22 books in Malayalam, most of which are aimed at young readers. Her writing often focuses on themes of empathy, nature, and the emotional world of children. She also served as he editor of Eureka, a popular children's science and literature magazine published by the Kerala Sasthra Sahithya Parishad.

== Selected works ==
- Mazhathulli Kathakal [Rain drop stories] (in Malayalam). POORNA PUBLICATIONS. 2023. ISBN 978-8130025872. Short story collection.
- Panjarathari Ninanju, Panjaracchiriyil Vitarnnu [Sipping the sweet sugar and burst into a sweet smile] (in Malayalam). POORNA PUBLICATIONS. 2025. ISBN 978-8130025872. Short story collection.
- Cheriya Rithuvum Valiya Lokavum [Small Season and Big World] (in Malayalam). POORNA PUBLICATIONS. 2019. ISBN 978-8130022291. Collection of 21 science articles.
- Anganeyanu Muthira Undayath [That's how Horsegram came about] (in Malayalam). POORNA PUBLICATIONS. 2018. ISBN 978-8130022291. Collection of folk stories.
- Anayuteyum Annarakkannanteyum Katha [The Story of the Elephant and the Squirrel] (in Malayalam). Kerala State Institute of Children's Literature. 2017. ISBN 9788184940800.
- Valupoya Kurangante Katha [The Story of the Monkey who lost his tail] (in Malayalam). Kerala State Institute of Children's Literature. 2017. ISBN 9788184940824.
- Veyilinumnde Niramulla Chirakukal [The sunshine also has colorful wings] (in Malayalam). POORNA PUBLICATIONS. 2017. ISBN 9788130019574. Short story collection.
- Ammamanavulla Kanivukal [Memories with the Fragrance of Motherhood] (in Malayalam). Kerala Sasthra Sahithya Parishad. 2021. ISBN 9788194955078.
- Kinavil Virinjath [That bloomed in the Dreams] (in Malayalam). Kerala Sasthra Sahithya Parishad. 2010. ISBN 9789380512167. Poetry collection.
- Ezhuthachane thedi oru penkutty [A girl in search of Ezhuthachan] (in Malayalam). Ezhuthachan study centre, Thirur. 2025. ISBN 9789391808952.
- Kunjikkili [Little bird] (in Malayalam).
- Theevandikothikal [Train dreams] (in Malayalam).

== Awards and honors ==
E. N. Sheeja's translation work Anganeyaanu Muthira Undayathu won the award in the translation category in the Kerala State Institute of Children's Literature's 2020 Children's Literature Awards. She later won the award in the short story/novel category at the Kerala State Institute of Children's Literature's 2022 Children's Literature Awards for her novel Amma Manamulla Kanivukal. In 2024, she received the Kerala Sahitya Akademi Award for Children's Literature for her novel Amma Manamulla Kanivukal. She has also received the Joseph Mundassery Award from Department of Education, Government of Kerala, for her contributions to literature and education. The Kerala State Council for Science, Technology and Environment's award for the best children's literature work in 2011 went to her biographical work titled Ammunte Swantham Darwin.
