= Bhoomi Geetham =

Bhoomigeetham
- Directed by: Kamal
- Written by: T. A. Razzaq
- Screenplay by: T. A. Razzaq
- Produced by: Silver Screen International
- Starring: Murali; Geetha; Jagathy Sreekumar; KPAC Lalitha
- Cinematography: Ramachandra Babu
- Edited by: K. Rajagopal
- Music by: Ouseppachan
- Production company: Silver Screen International
- Distributed by: Silver Screen International
- Release date: 1993
- Country: India
- Language: Malayalam

Bhoomigeetham is a 1993 Indian Malayalam-language film directed by Kamal and produced by Pavamani. The film stars Murali, Geetha, Jagathy Sreekumar and KPAC Lalitha in the lead roles. The film has musical score by Ouseppachan.

== Cast ==
- Murali as Thekkinkadu Krishnaprasad
- Geetha as Indulekha
- Jagathy Sreekumar as Adv. Ganesh Iyyer
- Vijayakumar as Sethunathan
- KPAC Lalitha as Rukmini
- Nedumudi Venu as Balan Mashu
- Abubakker as Achutha Marar
- Kunjunni Mash as himself
- Mullanezhi as himself
- Kaveri as Subhashini
- N. F. Varghese as Gangadharan
- Seetha as Ammukutti
- Augustine as Minister Harischandra Nadar
- Raveendran as Vijayan
- Rizabawa as Chandradas
- Sudheer as Doctor Philip
- C. I. Paul as Chief Minister
- Lal Jose as Journalist
- V. K. Sreeraman as Central minister
- Ravi Vallathol as Devan
- Kozhikode Narayanan Nair as Sankara Marar
- T. P. Madhavan as Driver Shivaraman
- Meghanathan as Parameshwaran
- Meena Ganesh as Student's mother
- Lishoy as Police officer
- Gomathi as Dakshyayani

== Soundtrack ==
The music was composed by Ouseppachan.

No.	Song	Singers	Lyrics	Length (m:ss)
1	"Amme Nila Devi" (F)	K. S. Chithra	P. Bhaskaran	5:07
2	"Amme Nila Devi"	K. J. Yesudas	P. Bhaskaran	5:08
3	"Chakravaalangal Nadungi"	K. J. Yesudas	P. Bhaskaran	5:00
4	"Parayoo Nee Hridayame"	K. S. Chithra, Murali	O. N. V. Kurup	4:46

== Reception ==
In an interview with Manorama in 2015, director Kamal classified Bhoomigeetham as one of the movies he wished he didn't work on.
