= K. Sreekumar =

Indian writer (born 1967)

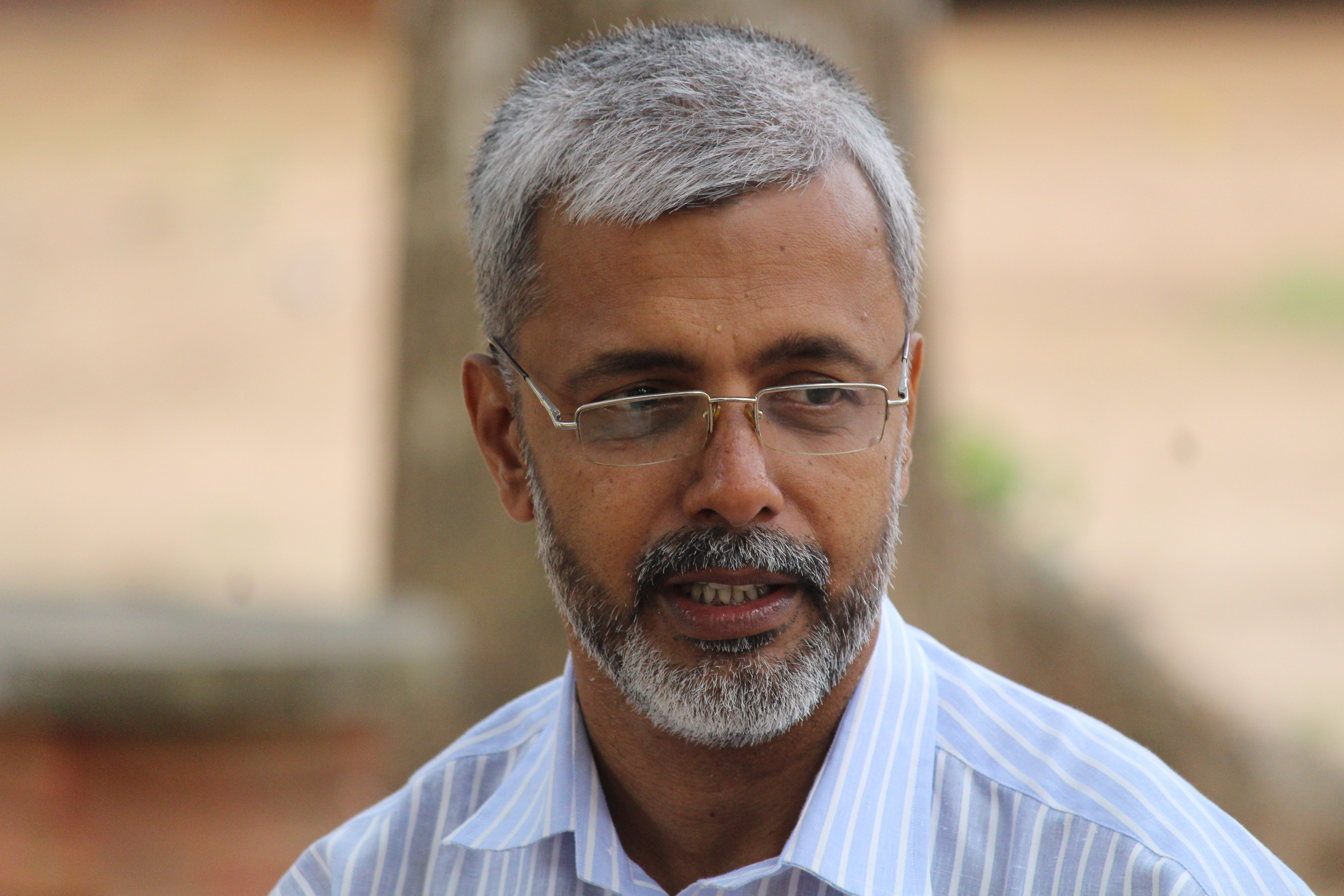
- Born: 31 December 1967 (age 58); Chottanikkara, Ernakulam district, Kerala, India
- Education: Maharaja's College, Kochi
- Occupation: Writer
- Spouse: R. Indu
- Children: 2
- Writing career
- Genre: Children's literature
- Notable awards: Bal Sahitya Puraskar (2012); Kerala Sahitya Akademi Award (2003&2022); Kerala Sangeetha Nataka Akademi Award

K. Sreekumar is a Malayalam language writer and journalist from Kerala, India. His book Malayalam Sangeetha Nataka Charitram, a book on Malayalam musical dramas won four awards, including the Kerala Sahitya Akademi Award for Scholarly Literature (2003) and the Kerala Sangeetha Nataka Akademi Award. For overall contribution to children's literature, he received the Bal Sahitya Puraskar, the children's literature award of Sahitya Akademi in 2012, and the C G Santhakumar Award, instituted by the Kerala State Institute of Children's Literature, in 2016. In 2023, he received Kerala Sahitya Akademi Award for the year 2022, for his children's book Chakkkaramampazham.

== Biography ==
K. Sreekumar was born in Chottanikkara in Ernakulam district to K. M. Lakshmanan Nair and A. S. Visalakshi, on 31 December 1967. His parents were teachers. After completing his M.A., M.Phil., B.Ed. degrees in Malayalam literature and a P.G. Diploma in Journalism, he obtained a doctorate degree for research on Malayalam musical dramas.

Sreekumar's writing career was influenced by his undergraduate and postgraduate studies in Malayalam at Maharaja's College, Ernakulam, under distinguished teachers such as Thuravoor Viswambharan, M. Thomas Mathew, K. G. Sankara Pillai, and George Irumbayam. After his studies, he worked as a journalist in Mathrubhumi from 1993 to 2016. During this period, he was also responsible for many publications under the Mathrubhumi Group, including the Mathrubhumi weekly and Sunday special editions of newspaper.

He is currently the coordinator of the Tirur Thunchan Memorial Trust and a consultant editor at Poorna Publications, Kozhikode.

=== Personal life ===
Sreekumar and his wife R. Indu, who is also the principal of Balussery G.G.H.S.S. school, have two children, Vyshakhan, a software engineer, and Nayanathara, an archaeology student. They live in Balussery in Kozhikode district now.

== Literary career ==
Sreekumar's first published work was Unnayayem Ponnu Muthassim, published in 1996. Of the 200 books he wrote, 186 are in the children's literature category. Among them, the books related to drama or theatre include Malayalam Sangeetha Nataka Charitram (meaning: History of Malayalam Musical Theatre), Sebastian Kunjukunju Bhagavatar (biography of Malayalam theatre actor Sebastian Kunjukunju Bhagavathar), Orumugham - Janapriya Nataka Vediyude Midippukal, and Andrews Master, the biography of Malayalam theatre person Andrews Master, published by Kerala Sangeetha Nataka Akademi. His notable works of children's literature include three volume book Nammude Nadodikathakalum Aythihyangalum (meaning:Our Folktales and Legends), published in 2010, Naradan, Ganapati, Karnan, Kunchirama Circus, Kuchelan, Lalithangi, Unnikatha, Viddi! Kushmanda, Ozhivukalam, Chakkaramampazham and Balakathasaram (published in 2018). Some of the stories he wrote are taught in classes 3 and 4 under the Kerala school syllabus. A poetry collection called Snehachanta has also been published.

The children's book Soviet Naatile Balakathakalum Nadodikathakalum, on children's stories and folktales from Soviet Union was published in two volumes by Mathrubhumi. The children's novel Kannur was about children becoming victims of political unrest in Kannur district, which he witnessed during his journalism times. The stories in Chakkaramambazham, which won 2023 Kerala Sahitya Akademi Award are developed around new topics such as gender equality, adoption, floods, and COVID-19.

His 200th book is, 1312-page two-volume book Malayala Balasahitya Charithram, which documents the history of Malayalam children's literature from ancient folk tales and ballads to writings of 2021.

His next book to be released is the biography of M. T. Vasudevan Nair. MT had already announced that he would not write an autobiography. His stance was that since his life had been covered in many books he written, there was no point in writing another autobiography. But one day, he unexpectedly called Sreekumar to his flat and asked him to write a biography. MT died when the writing was ninety percent complete. The 1008-page book, which comprehensively documents MT's personal and creative life, is scheduled for release on 13 August 2025, the day of Uthrattathi (Uttara Bhadrapada) in the month of Karkkidakam, the birthday of MT according to birth star and Malayalam calendar. The book is written by combining information gathered from MT's relatives, friends, and cultural activists associated with MT, as well as things MT told him directly. The book does not have a foreword or introduction. Sreekumar decided that MT's biography did not need an introduction by anyone else.

== Awards and honours ==
Malayalam Sangeetha Nataka Charitram, a books on Malayalam musical dramas won four awards, including the Kerala Sahitya Akademi Award for Scholarly Literature (2003) and the Kerala Sangeetha Nataka Akademi Award. Sreekumar received the Bal Sahitya Puraskar, the children's literature award of Sahitya Akademi, Government of India in 2012 for his comprehensive contribution to the field of children's literature.

In 2012 May, he received the Sree Padmanabha Swami children's literature award, instituted by Gramam Samskarika Vedi for his children's novel Ozhivukalam. In 2016, he received the C G Santhakumar Award for overall contribution to children's literature, instituted by the Kerala State Institute of Children's Literature. In 2023, he received Kerala Sahitya Akademi Award (for the year 2022) for his children's book Chakkkaramampazham. He also received several other awards including Abu Dhabi Sakthi Award, Cherukad Award, Bhima Children's Literature Award, Yuva Puraskar of Calcutta Bharatheeya Bhasha Parishad, Kadavanad Award and SBT Award. In 2025, Sreekumar received the Federal Bank Literary Award for his biography of Malayalam writer M. T. Vasudevan Nair.

As a journalist Sreekumar also received the Kerala State Media Award for General Reporting. The award went to the news series Aashubhayatra Arakshitayatra, which deals with the problems of train travel in Kerala that time.
