= Anitha Thampi =

Indian poet

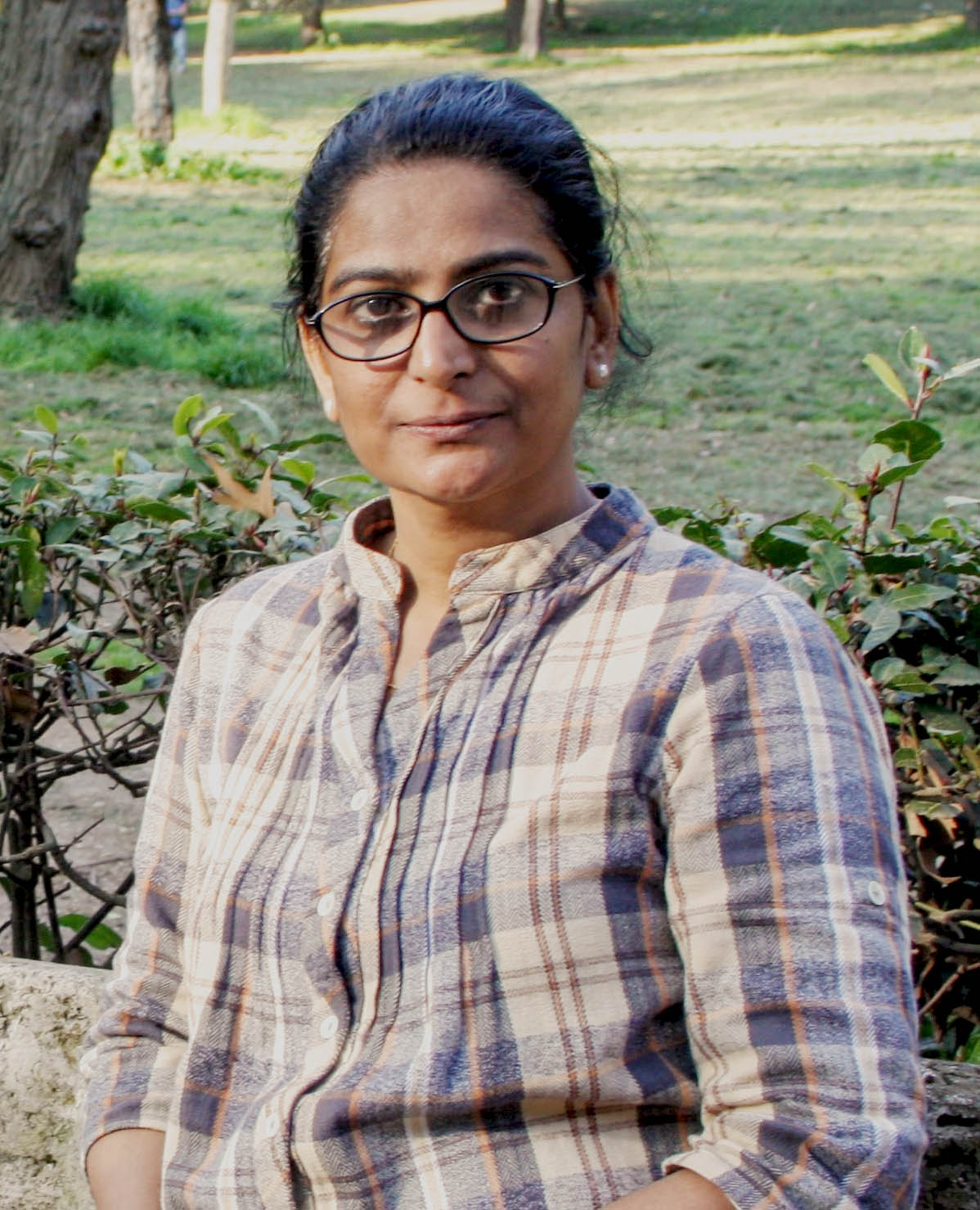
- Born: 22 May 1968 Alappuzha, Kerala, India
- Occupation: Poet
- Language: Malayalam

Anitha Thampi (born 1968) is a Malayalam language poet, essayist and translator from the state of Kerala, India. Critically acclaimed within and outside of India, her works have been widely translated into a number of languages and has appeared in various journals and anthologies worldwide.

== Biography ==
Anitha Thampi was born in 1968 in the town of Alappuzha in central Kerala. She was drawn to poetry and started writing and publishing poems from an early age. While pursuing her formal education in science and engineering, she started publishing poems in mainstream journals at the beginning of her undergraduate years. A graduate in Chemical Engineering from the University of Kerala, she later proceeded to obtain MTech and PhD from IITBombay. She is a practising technologist and nurtures a keen interest in the philosophy of waste. She has published four collections of poetry : Muttamatikkumpol (While Sweeping the Frontyard, 2004), Azhakillaathavayellam (All That Are Bereft of Beauty, 2010), Alappuzha Vellam (Alappuzha Water, 2016), and a trilingual co-authored collection, A Different Water (2018). Her translations into Malayalam include writings of Juan Ramón Jiménez, Carlo Collodi, Les Murray and Mourid Barghouti. Currently, she lives and works in Thiruvananthapuram, Kerala.

== Bibliography ==
- Muttamadikkumpol (Sweeping the Front yard), Current Books, Thrissur, Kerala, 2004 .
- Azhakillaathavayellam (All that are bereft of beauty), Current Books, Thrissur, 2010.
- Alappuzhavellam (The Water of Alappuzha), DC Books, Kottayam, 2016
- A Different Water (with Welsh poet Sian Melangell Dafydd), Poetrywala, Mumbai, 2017
- Les Murray, Katha Books, New Delhi, 2007.
- Pennum Puliyum (Rewriting poetry for children), Kerala State Institute of Children's Literature (KSICL), 2011.
- I Saw Ramallah (Autobiographical monologue of Palestinian poet Mourid Barghouti), Olive Books, Kozhikode, 2017.
- Pinocchio (Italian Classic), DC Books, Kottayam, 2021.

== Translations into Malayalam ==
- Les Murray, Katha Books, New Delhi, 2007.
- Pennum Puliyum (Rewriting poetry for children), Kerala State Institute of Children's Literature (KSICL), 2011.
- I Saw Ramallah (Autobiographical monologue of Palestinian poet Mourid Barghouti), Olive Books, Kozhikode, 2017.
- Pinocchio (Italian Classic), DC Books, Kottayam, 2021.
- Platero and I (Spanish Classic; in translation).
