= 2023 Kerala Sahitya Akademi Awards =

2023 Literary award given to Malayalam writers

Kerala Sahitya Akademi Award
- Awarded for: Outstanding books of literary merit
- Date: 25 July 2024
- Location: Trichur
- Country: India
- Presented by: Kerala Sahitya Akademi
- First award: 1958

The 2023 Kerala Sahitya Akademi Awards was announced on 25 July 2024. The award has been given each year since 1958, by the Kerala Sahitya Akademi (Kerala Literary Academy), to Malayalam writers for their outstanding books of literary merit.

== Winners ==
| Category | Recipient | Work | Image |
|---|---|---|---|
| Poetry | Kalpatta Narayanan | Theranjedutha Kavithakal | |
| Novel | Haritha Savithri | Zin | |
| Story | N. Rajan | Udaya Sports and Arts Club | |
| Drama | Gireesh P. C. | E for Oedipus | |
| Literary Criticism | P. Pavithran | Bhoopadam Thalathirikkumpol | |
| Biography and Autobiography | K. Venu | Oranweshanathinte Katha | |
| Travelogue | Nandini Menon | Aamcho Basthar | |
| Humour | Suneesh Varanad | Varanadan Kathakal | |
| Children's Literature | Gracy | Penkuttiyum Koottarum | |
| Scholarly Literature | B. Rajeevan | Indiaye Veendedukkal | |
| Translation | M. M. Sreedharan | Kathakathike | |
| Overall Contributions | K. V. Kumaran; Prema Jayakumar; P. K. Gopi; Bakkalam Damodaran; Rajan Thiruvoth | | |
