= Sreejith Moothedath =

Indian writer (born 1978)

- Born: March 31, 1978 (age 48); Bhumivathukkal in Kozhikode district, Kerala
- Occupation: Novelist
- Writing career
- Notable work: Penguinukalute Vankarayil
- Notable awards: Bal Sahitya Puraskar (2025)

Sreejith Moothedath is a short story writer, novelist and children's writer from Kerala, India. His novel Penguinukalute Vankarayil received the Sahitya Akademi Bal Sahitya Puraskar in 2025.

== Biography ==
Sreejith was born on 31 March 1978 in Bhumivathukkal, Kozhikode district, to P.M. Bhaskaran Master and O.K. Nalini. He completed his primary education from Vanimel Crescent High School, and higher education from Calicut University, Gauhati University and Annamalai University. He has a post-graduate degree in history and political science. He is currently working as a social science teacher at Cherpp C.N.N. Boys' High School in Thrissur district.

== Literary contributions ==
Sreejith's notable work is the children's novel Penguinukalute Vankarayil (meaning: In Penguins' Land). This novel aims to instill scientific thinking and environmental awareness in children. The theme is that three teenage children, with the help of a girl named Saniya, who comes from an alien planet, travel through various continents and islands, see various living creatures in the Andaman Islands, Indonesian islands, and the coastal areas of Australia, and the nature in which they grow, and finally reach Antarctica, the land of penguins. Upon reaching Antarctica, they understand the environmental problems faced by penguins as a result of global warming. Penguinukalute Vankarayil was published in 2022 by the Kerala State Institute of Children's Literature.

His other children's literature works such as Kuruvikalte Lokam, African Thumpikal, Chakkarapadam, Surya Yatrayde Vismayacheppu, Tuvalthottill, etc. also feature environmental awareness and love for fellow beings as major themes. A chapter titled Samaravriksham from the children's novel Chakkarapadam was included the Bharatiya Vidyaniketan syllabus.

Other works include Jalakangal (short story collection), Bhumivathukkal Suryodayam (novel), Palette, Nayanmoni, Ninavazhiyile Nizhalukal, etc. Ninavazhiyile Nizhalukal is a novel that narrates the history of political violence of Kadathanad region in Kerala.

== Awards ==
Sreejith has received the Mullanezhi Award in 2012 from the Manorama Balajanasakhya, the Nanma Award in 2013 for best blog writing for the story 'Aswadanathinte Adhyayangal', and the Environment Award in 2014 from the Mumbai Green Nature Foundation.

The novel Penguinukalute Vankarayil has received the Kesavan Vellikulangara Memorial Children's Literature Award and the Children's Literature Award instituted by Sarovaram Books in memory of Ambalakkara C. Raveendran Master. Penguinukalute Vankarayil received the Sahitya Akademi Bal Sahitya Puraskar in 2025.
