= Chenda (film) =

Indian film by A. Vincent

- Theatrical poster
- Directed by: A. Vincent
- Screenplay by: Thoppil Bhasi
- Story by: B. E. Ramanathan
- Produced by: A. Vincent
- Starring: Madhu; Srividya; Sukumari; Sudheer
- Cinematography: A. Venkat
- Edited by: G. Venkittaraman
- Music by: G. Devarajan
- Production company: Sanmarga Chithra
- Release date: 27 April 1973
- Country: India
- Language: Malayalam

Chenda is a 1973 Indian Malayalam-language film, directed and produced by A. Vincent. The film stars Madhu, Srividya, Sukumari, Sudheer and Kaviyoor Ponnamma. It was released on 27 April 1973.

== Cast ==
- Madhu
- Sreevidya
- Sudheer
- Sukumari
- Kaviyoor Ponnamma
- Adoor Bhasi
- Thikkurissy Sukumaran Nair
- Sankaradi
- Bahadoor
- Balan K. Nair
- C. A. Balan
- Kedamangalam Ali
- Kunchan
- Nanditha Bose
- S. P. Pillai
- Sathyapalan Nair
- Thrithala Sreekumar
- Subhadra
- Kottarakkara Sreedharan Nair
- Dance: Mayuram Dance Sisters:

(Kumari Kamala, Kumari Radha, Kumari Vasanti)

== Soundtrack ==
The music was composed by G. Devarajan and the lyrics were written by Sumangala, P. Bhaskaran, Vayalar Ramavarma and Bharanikkavu Sivakumar.

Song	Singers	Lyrics
"Akkare Akkare Ashoka"	P. Madhuri	Sumangala
"Chaarumukheeyusha Mandam"	K. J. Yesudas	P. Bhaskaran
"Nrithyathi Nrithyathi"	K. J. Yesudas	Vayalar Ramavarma
"Panchamithirunaal"	P. Madhuri	Bharanikkavu Sivakumar
"Sundarimaar"	P. Madhuri	P. Bhaskaran
"Thaalathil Thaalathil"	P. Madhuri	P. Bhaskaran
