= Bharanikkavu Sivakumar =

Indian lyricist for Malayalam film (1949–2007)

- Born: 17 June 1949; Kattanam, Alappuzha district, Kerala
- Died: 24 January 2007; Thiruvananthapuram, Kerala, India
- Occupation: lyricist
- Spouse: Omanakumari
- Children: Parvathi Sivakumar

Bharanikkavu Sivakumar (17 June 1949 – 24 January 2007) was an Indian lyricist from Kerala who worked in Malayalam film industry.

He was the grandson of Mahakavi Azhakathu Padmanabha Kuruppu, the writer of the first 'Mahakavya' in Malayalam, 'Ramachandra Vilasam'. His first movie as a lyricist was Chenda (1973). He went on to write 272 songs for 88 Malayalam films.

Sivakumar died suddenly due to a heart attack at his home in Thiruvananthapuram on 24 January 2007, aged 58.

== Partial Filmography ==
- Chenda (1973) - Panchamithirunaal
- Swimming Pool (1976) - Sumangalaathira Rathri
- Narakasuran (2006)

Chottanikkara Amma Kamam krodham moham
