= P. Narendranath =

Malayalam author

- Born: 18 July 1934; Nellaya, a village in the Palakkad district of Kerala, India
- Died: 3 November 1991 (aged 57)
- Education: Bachelor's degree in Economics and Banking
- Writing career
- Language: Malayalam
- Genre: Children's literature

P. Narendranath (18 July 1934 – 3 November 1991) was a Malayalam author. He is best known for his contributions in children's literature. He wrote more than 35 works including novels, plays and children's books.

== Early life ==
P. Narendranath was born in Nellaya, a village near Pattambi, Palakkad District, in the Indian state of Kerala, on 18 July 1934. He did not complete his basic education due to financial difficulties. At 19, he joined Cochin Commercial Bank as a clerk and later earned a Bachelor's degree in Economics and Banking. Cochin Commercial Bank was acquired by Canara Bank in 1963. A banker by profession, he moved into children's literature. His first work was published when he was 18. He continued publishing books and made an impact on Malayalam children's literature. Some of his works were translated into both Tamil and Hindi.

== Recognition ==
Throughout his life, P. Narendranath earned awards for his contributions to children's literature. They are listed below.

- Kerala Sahitya Akademi Award
  - Kerala Sahitya Akademi Award for Children's Literature
- National Award by the Department of Culture
- SPC Award
- Indian Council for Child Education Award

== Family ==
P. Narendrantha married Smt Amrutha Kumari. They had four children, son Mohandas and daughters Anitha, Vinitha, and Sunitha. Sunitha Nedungadi is a ghazal singer. Vinitha Nedungadi is a dancer.

P. Narendranath died on 3 November 1991. P. Narendranath Memorial Sree Vidya Academy is a dance academy named after him in Palakkad.
