= Jaishree Misra =

Indian author

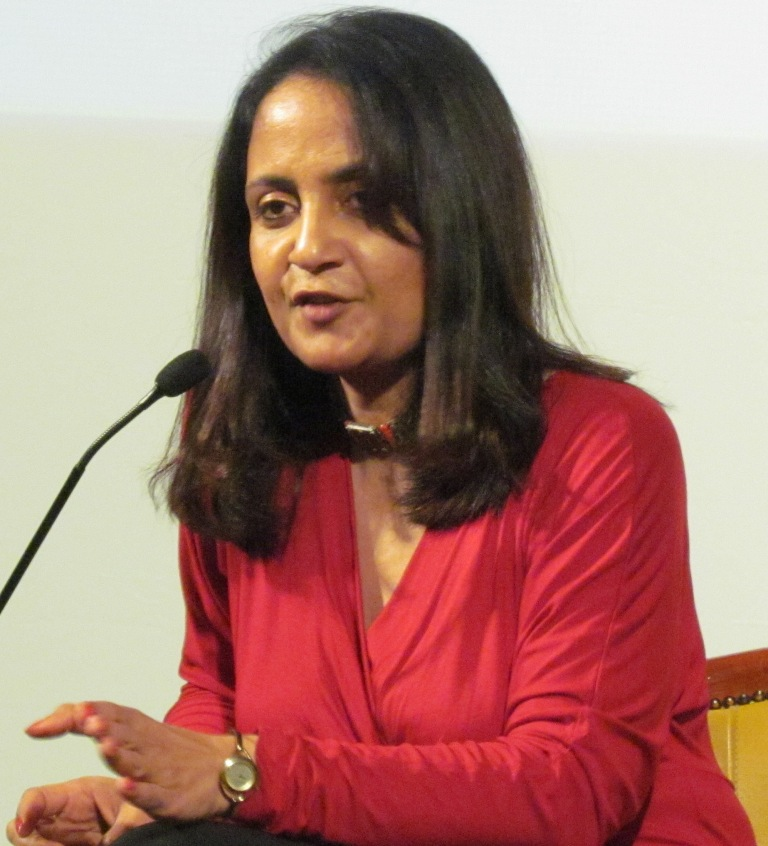
- Jaishree Misra in a literary programme at Sharjah International Book Fair on 24 November 2011
- Born: 1961 (age 64–65); New Delhi, India
- Occupation: Writer
- Writing career
- Genre: Contemporary
- Subjects: Fiction, non-fiction, novels
- Website: www.jaishreemisra.com

Jaishree Misra (born 1961) is an Indian writer. As of 2023, she had written eight novels.

== Books ==
Misra's first novel, Ancient Promises (2002), is on the syllabus at several universities. It has been described as exploring "the notions of women's autonomy and agency", and is partly autobiographical.

Her fourth novel, Rani, is historical fiction based on the life of Rani Lakshmibai of Jhansi. It was published by Penguin in 2007 and banned soon after by the Uttar Pradesh state government in India, as it represented Rani Lakshmibai as having a love affair with a white British man.

She is the editor of Of Mothers and Others: Stories, Essays, Poems (2013), a collection of writing about motherhood.

Misra has written a memoir, A House for Mr Mishra.
