= Kiliroor Radhakrishnan =

Short-story writer of Malayalam literature

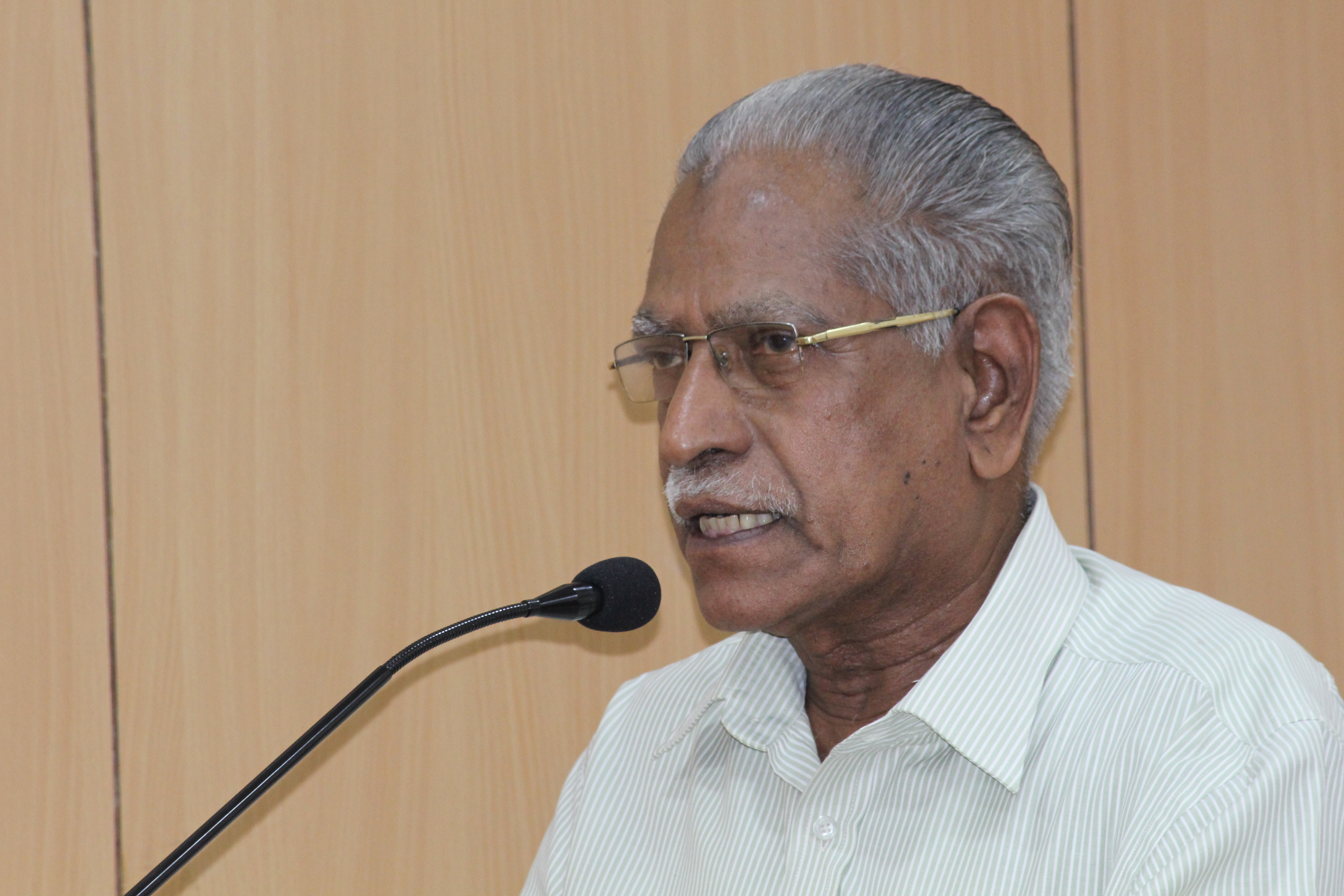
- Born: 14 January 1944 (age 82); Kiliroor, Kingdom of Travancore, British India (present day Kottayam, Kerala, India)
- Occupation: Short-story writer
- Children: Kavitha, Hari
- Writing career
- Language: Malayalam
- Notable awards: See Awards

Kiliroor Radhakrishnan (born 14 January 1944) is an Indian short-story writer of Malayalam literature.

== Biography ==
Radhakrishnan was born in Kiliroor near Kottayam in Kerala, India. He started writing in the 1960s. Some of his stories, particularly children's literature, were published in Malayalam. Radhakrishnan was the administrative manager and general manager of DC Books and Current Books from 1979 to 2002. He served as the chief editor of Amala Weekly (published for Malayalis abroad) and was the publication consultant for Poorna Publications. He also became a governing body member of State Children's Literature Institute.

== Selected works ==
Radhakrishnan wrote more than 100 books, including short stories, novels, children's literature, and translations. The following is a selection of his works:

- 50 Vishwaprasidha Naadodikathakal
- Ammayodoppam
- Aanakadha
- Daivathinte Simhasanam
- Jathaka Kadhakal
- Kuttikalude Aitheehyamaala
- Nirangal
- Ottayal Pattalam
- Swarnathakkol
- Vikramadithyakadhakal

== Awards ==
Radhakrishnan received multiple awards for different works, including the following:

| Work | Award |
|---|---|
| Nirangal | Bhima Balasahithya Award |
| Ammayodoppam | SBI Balasahithya Award |
| Aanakadha | NCERT Award, Award of KSCLI |
| Daivathinte Simhasanam | Bhima Balasahithya Award |
| Swarnathakkol | Sri Patmanabha Samman of Sahithya Academy, Basheer Sahithya Award |
| Ottayal Pattalam | Pala K. M. Mathew Award |

He received the K. Thayat Award in 2015 and the Award of Government of Kerala in 2017 for his comprehensive works.
