= Palliyara Sreedharan =

Indian writer

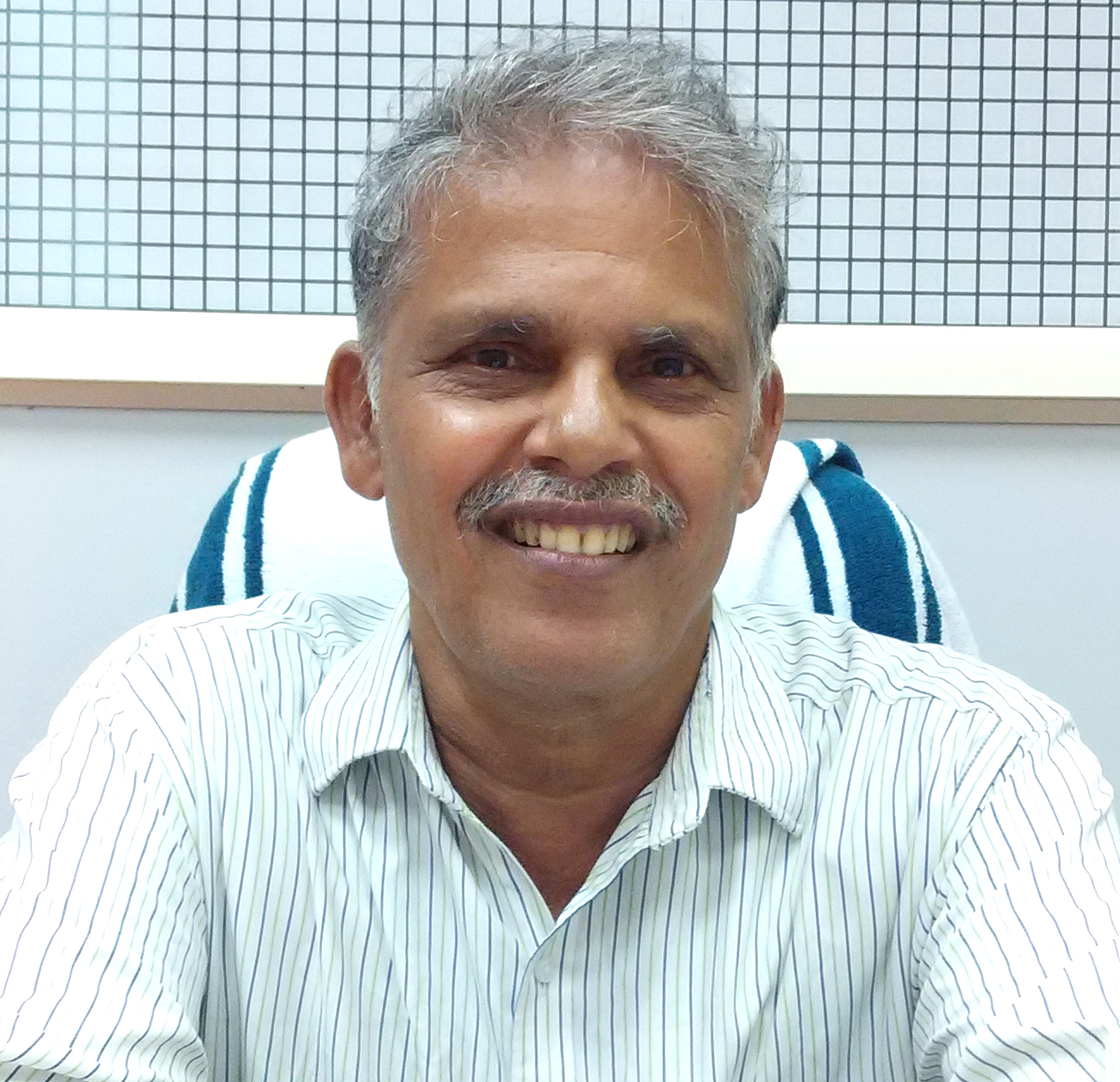
- Born: 17 January 1950; Kannur, Kerala, India
- Occupations: Director, State Institute of Children's Literature, Kerala
- Writing career
- Subject: Mathematician
- Website: ksicl.org/palliyarasreedharan/

Palliyara Sreedharan is a writer in India on Mathematics. With the volume and popularity of his books written in Malayalam, the regional language of Kerala, he has earned the name 'Mathematician of Kerala'. He has written and published more than 150 books. This is a record in mathematics in Indian languages. He has co-authored books for the State Council for Educational Research and Training - SCERT, including textbooks, and for the National Council for Educational Research and Training - NCERT. He was the director of the Science Park, headed by the Kannur District Panchayat. He has been the Director of the Kerala State Institute of Children's Literature since 22 August 2016. He has received numerous awards, including the Government of Kerala Award for Outstanding Contribution to Children's Literature.

He was born on 17 January 1950 in the Kannur district of Kerala state. He completed his school education from Muttannoor L.P., School, Edayannur Govt. U.S. P. Mattannur Pazhassi Raja N. in School and Koodali High School. After graduating in mathematics from Pazhazhi Raja N.S.S. College, Mattannoor, he secured a B.Ed. Degree from also Government Teachers Training College, Calicut. He has been a teacher in mathematics at Government High School, Koodali, since 1972. Though his writing career started in 1999, his first book in Mathematics was published in 1978.

== Writing career ==
Palliyara Sreedhran has authored mathematical literature in Malayalam. He's known for writing books on mathematics. He has also authored books in various literary genres such as Short Story, Poetry, Drama, Biography and Technology. He is primarily an author of mathematics based out of Kerala.

He is a columnist in mathematics in the children's and students' pull-out of many newspapers in Malayalam, such as Malayalamanorama (Padipura, Thozhilveedhi, Kaithiri, Vanitha), Mathrubhumi (Vijnanarangam, Thozhivartha, Balabhoomi), Deshabhimani (Weekly, Kilivathil. He is a regular contributor of articles in periodicals like Vidyarangam, Eureka, Sastrakeralam, Sahityaposhini, Balakathukam, Balachandika, Prathichaya, Mayilpeeli, etc.

== Books in English ==
- Some Great Mathematicians of the World
- Amazing Mathematics
- The story of Time
- Wonderland of Mathematics
- Funny Mathematics
- Play with Maths
- Magic of Numbers
- Puzzles in Maths
- Mathsmagic
- Magic Squares
- Superquiz in Maths
- Maths is a great wonder
- Enjoy Maths
- Maths is a magic pot
- Easy ways in Maths

== Books in Malayalam ==
Encyclopedia of Mathematicians (Ganitha Vinjanakkosam) Great Mathematicians of the World (Ganithasasthra Prathibhakal) Vedic Mathematics (Veda Ganitham) Mathemagics (Mathematics + Magic) Sreenivasa Ramanujan: A Biography Magic Numbers in Mathematics (Athbhutha Sankhyakal) You can Play with Mathematics (Kanakku Kalichu Rasikkan) Mathematics: A Magic Pot (Kanakku Oru Manthrika Cheppu) Mathematics: A Sweet Candy (Ganitham Madhuram) Playing with Mathematics (Kanakkukondu Kalikkam) Magic with Numbers (Sanhyakalude Jaalavidhyakal) Pythagorus: A Biography Stories in Mathematics (Ganitha Kadhakal) Wonders in Mathematics (Kanakkile Vismayangal) Learning Mathematics is a Pleasure (Ganitham Ethra Rasakaram) Kadathanattu Thamburan: A Biography Wonderful Puzzles in Mathematics (Kusruthikkkanakkukal) Learning Mathematics through Songs (Paattupaadi Kanakku Padikkaam) Story of Time (Samayathinte Kadha) The Wonderful World of Mathematics (Enthathbhutham, Ethra Rasakaram) Arya Bandhu (Samayathinte Kadha) Mathematics in the Nature (Prakruthiyile Ganitham) Grow with Mathematics (Namukku Valaraam) Simple Machines (Lakhu Yanthrangal) The World of Machines (Yanthrangalude Lokam) Back to School (Veendum Schoolil) Shortcuts in Mathematics (Kanakkile Yeluppavahikal) The Wonderful World of Numbers (Sankhyakalude Athbhutha Prapancham) Some Magic with Mathematics (Kanakkile Jalavidyakal) Crosswords in Mathematics (Kanakkile Padhaprasnangal) You can Score High Marks Mathematics (Varoo.. Kanakkil Midukaraavaam) The Magic That is Mathematics (Kanakkinte Indrajaalam) The Mathematics of Beauty (Soundaryathinte Ganithasasthram) Galileo: A Biography The Story of Numbers (Sankhyakalude Kadha) The Great Wonder Called Mathematics (Ganitham Mahathbhutham) The Festival of Mathematics (Ganithasasthramela) Mathematics Quiz (Ganithasasthra Quiz) Mathematics Super Quiz (Ganithasasthra Super Quiz) Vedic Mathematics Can Make You Excel in Maths (Veda Ganitham) Some Wonderful Tricks in Mathematics (Ambarappikkunna Ganithasasthram) Science Quiz (Sasthra Quiz) Brain Boosting Through Mathematics (Budhivikasathinu Ganithaprasnangal) Mathematics to Play and Win (Kanakk: Kaliyum Karyavum) The Gems in Mathematics (Kanakkile Kanakam) The Enigmatic World of Mathematics (Kanakkinte Vichithralokam) Tangram Puzzle: King of All Plays (Tangram Kali: Kalikalude Rajaav) Make Numbers Your Playmates (Sankhyakal Kalikkoottukar) Multiplication A Pleasure (Gunanam Rasakaramaakkam) Five Mathematics-based Dramas (Anchu Ganitha Nadakangal) The World of Wonders (Athbhuthangalude Lokam) A Pleasure Trip to Mathematics (Kanakilekkoru Vinodayathra) A Voyage to the Centre of the Earth (Bhoomiyude Kendrathilekk Oru Yathra) The Magic Square (Manthrika Chathuram) Robots (Robottukal) Funny Mathematics (Chirippikkunna Ganithasasthram) Computer (Computer) Aryabhatan: A Biography The Story of Zero (Poojyathinte Kadha) The Wonderful World of Mathematics (Kanakkinte Mayalokam) The History and Science of Mathematics (Ganitham: Charithraum Sasthravum) Enjoying Mathematics (Ganithasallapam) Some Pictorial Quiz in Mathematics (Ganitha Quiz Chithrangaliloode) Mathematics as a Sweet Candy (Ganitha Midayi) Mathematics and Computer (Ganithavum Computerum) Let's Play and Learn Mathematics (Kanakk Kalich Padikkam) Mathematics is So Simple (Ganitham Lalitham) The Easy Door to Mathematics (Kanakkinte Kilivathil) The Fun that is Mathematics (Ganitham Phalitham) Wonderful Puzzles in Mathematics (Rasakaramaya Ganithaprasnangal) Branches of Mathematics (Ganithasasthra Sakhakal) Two Plus Two is Equal to Five (Randum Randum Anju) Some Funny Puzzles in Mathematics (Ganithaprasnangal Vinodathinu) The Knowledge Box of Mathematics (Ganithainjanachepp) Mathematics for School (Kanakkanmarkkum Kanakkikalkkum) Some Famous Books in Mathematics (Thiranjedutha Ganithakruthikal) The Ocean of Mathematics (Ganithavinjana Sagaram) The Puzzle of One Rupee (Oru Roopa Yevide Poyi?) Mathematics: A Funny Game (Kanakku Oru Kalithamasa) Some Biggest Numbers in Mathematics (Ambo! Yenthoru Sankhya!) A Pictorial Dictionary of Mathematics (Sachithra Ganithasasthra Nikhandu), One Thousand Puzzles in Mathematics (Aayiram Ganithaprasnangal), Pythagorus and American President (Amerikkan Presidentum Pythagorasum) One Plus One is Equal to .... (Onnum Onnum Chernnaal) Dictionary of Lost Words in Malayalam (Pazhama Malayalam)

== Awards and Recognitions ==
- 1982: Award for Best Instructional Aid Making Contest by State Council for Educational Research and Training
- 1992: State Award for Best Teacher
- 1992: Award by Adhyapaka Kala Sahithya Samithi for the book ‘Sankhyakalude Jalavidyakal’ (The Magic of Numbers)
- 1993: Best Book on Children's Literature, Award by State Institute for Children's Literature (for the book Sankhyakalude Kadha)
- 1993: Samanwaya Sahithya Lifetime Achievement Award
- 1995: Asraya Blasahthya Award for Best Book in Children's Literature (for the book Athbhutha Sankhyakal)
- 1998: Endowment Award by Kerala Sahithya Academy for the book ‘Poojyathinte Kadha’ (Story of the Number Zero)
- 2004: Lifetime Achievement Award for Children's Literature
- 2004: Subhadrakumari Chouhan Centenary Award (Haryana)
- 2005: Bharat Excellence Award for Children's Literature
- 2006: Best Book on Science Literature, Award by State Council for Science, Technology and Environment (for the book Ganithasasthraprathibhakal)
- 2007: Bheema Award for authoring more than 80 books in Mathematics
- 2010: Lifetime Achievement Award by Adhyapaka Kala Sahithya Samithi
- 2018: Abu Dhabi Sakthi Award (Children's literature) - Kathayalla Jeevitham Thanne
- 2021: Lifetime Achievement Award by Bala Sahithya Academy
