= Leela Nambudiripad =

Indian writer of children's literature (1934–2021)

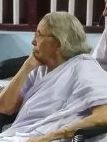
- Born: 16 May 1934; Palakkad, Kerala, British India
- Died: 27 April 2021 (aged 86)
- Occupations: Writer, author
- Spouse: Ashtamurthy Nambudiripad
- Children: 3
- Writing career
- Pen name: Sumangala
- Notable works: Neypaayasam; Manchaatikkuru

Leela Nambudiripad (16 May 1934 – 27 April 2021), known by her pen name Sumangala, was an Indian author of children's literature in Malayalam. Some of her notable works included Neypaayasam, Mithayippoti, as well as translations of the Panchatantra into Malayalam.

She received the 1979 Kerala Sahitya Akademi Award for Children's Literature and the 2013 Kendra Sahitya Akademi Award for Children's Literature.

== Early life ==
Leela Nambudripad was born on 16 May 1934, the eldest daughter of eminent Sanskrit scholars O M C Narayanan Nambudiripad and Uma Antharjanam in Vellinezhi (Palakkad District, Kerala, India).

== Career ==
Nambduripad started her career as a writer in 1959, writing under her pen name Sumangala. In a career of over 40 years, she was referred to as the Enid Blyton of Malayalam and penned over 50 books, of which 23 are for children.

Her most celebrated works include Mithayippoti (transl. sweet box), Neypaayasam (transl. rice pudding with ghee), Manchaatikkuru, Kurinjiyum Koottukaarum, Ee Kattha Kettittundo (transl. have you heard this story?), Nadodi Cholkathakal, Rahasyam and Kudamanikal. She was most noted for her translation into Malayalam of the Panchatantra. Sumangala has also translated the Valmiki Ramayanam into Malayalam from Sanskrit. She also was the compiler of Pacha Malayala Nikhandu, a dictionary of colloquial Malayalam. The book was praised for its insights and diverse facts about the Malayalam language.

She wrote a song for the Malayalam film Chenda (1973) and was also a contributor to Poompatta, a Malayalam-language comic for children. She also wrote a book on the history of Kerala Kalamandalam, a center for performing arts and learning in Kerala.

Sumangala was the recipient of many awards, including the Kerala Sahitya Akademi Award for the best work in children's literature in 1979 and the Bala Sahitya Institute award for lifelong contribution towards children's literature in 1999. She was the recipient of the Kendra Sahitya Academy Award for Children's Literature in 2013. The Kerala Sahitya Akademi president Vaisakhan praised her for leading generations of Malayalam children into the world of reading: her books instilled the importance of human values and were simple and readable for children. He compared the tone of her writing to that of a "grandmother telling stories to her grandchildren".

== Personal life ==
Nambudiripad was married to Desamangalam Ashtamurthy Nambudiripad until his death in 2014. They had three children: Usha Nambudiripad, D. Narayanan and D. Ashtamurthy. She served in the Public Relations Department of Kerala Kalamandalam for 22 years. She resided in Wadakkancherry, Thrissur District, India.

Nambudiripad died on 27 April 2021 at her home in Wadakkancherry from age-related ailments, shortly before turning 87.

== Bibliography ==
_{Source(s):}

- Nuṇakkul̲ikaḷ, cer̲ukathakaḷ (1967)
- Kaṭamakaḷ (1967)
- Caturaṅgaṃ : nōval (1969)
- Tatta par̲añña 65 kathakaḷ (1989)
- Taṅkakiṅṅiṇi (1992)
- Pan̄catantr̲aṃ (1994)
- Mañcāṭikkuru (1994)
- Rahasʼsaṃ (1995)
- Albutha Ramayanam (2001)
- Ee katha kettittunda? (2003)
- Pañcatantrakathakaḷ (2011)
- Uṇṇikaḷkk Kr̥ṣṇakathakaḷ (2014)
- Pañcakanyakamār : kathakaḷ (2015)
- Śr̲īrāmakathakaḷ - Sree Rama kathakal (2016)
- Paccamalayālạaṃ nighaṇṭu = Pachamalayalam nighandu (2016)
- Eeswaravatharangalude ammamar (2017)
- Onpatu Śrīrāmanmāruṃ mat̲t̲u kathakaḷuṃ : bālasāhityaṃ (2017)
- Parīkṣittinu kiṭṭiya śāpavuṃ mat̲t̲u kathakaḷuṃ : bālasāhityaṃ (2017)
- Neyppāyasaṃ (2017)
- Śrīkr̥ṣṇanuṃ ōṭakkul̲aluṃ : bālasāhityaṃ (2017)
- Arshabharatha sthreekal (2017)
- Kuruvamsathile bagyaheenakalaya vanithakal (2017)
- Karṇanu kiṭṭiya śāpavuṃ mat̲t̲u kathakaḷuṃ : bālasāhityaṃ (2017)
- Apsara sthreekal (2017)
- Pathivrathakalaya ranhimar (2017)
- Śivant̲e pāṭṭuvaṇṭiyuṃ mat̲t̲u kathakaḷuṃ : bālasāhityaṃ (2017)
- Pathivrathakalaya munipathnimar (2017)
- Rāvaṇanuṃ Yamadharmanuṃ mat̲t̲u kathakaḷuṃ : bālasāhityaṃ (2017)
- Śrīpārvatikku kiṭṭiya śāpavuṃ mat̲t̲u kathakaḷuṃ : bālasāhityaṃ (2017)
- Peran̲pin̲ pūkkaḷ : Malaiyāḷa cir̲ār kataikaḷ (2018)
- Pañcatantrakathakaḷ (2019)
- Miṭhāyippoti (2020)
