= Kerala State Institute of Children's Literature =

The institute's logo

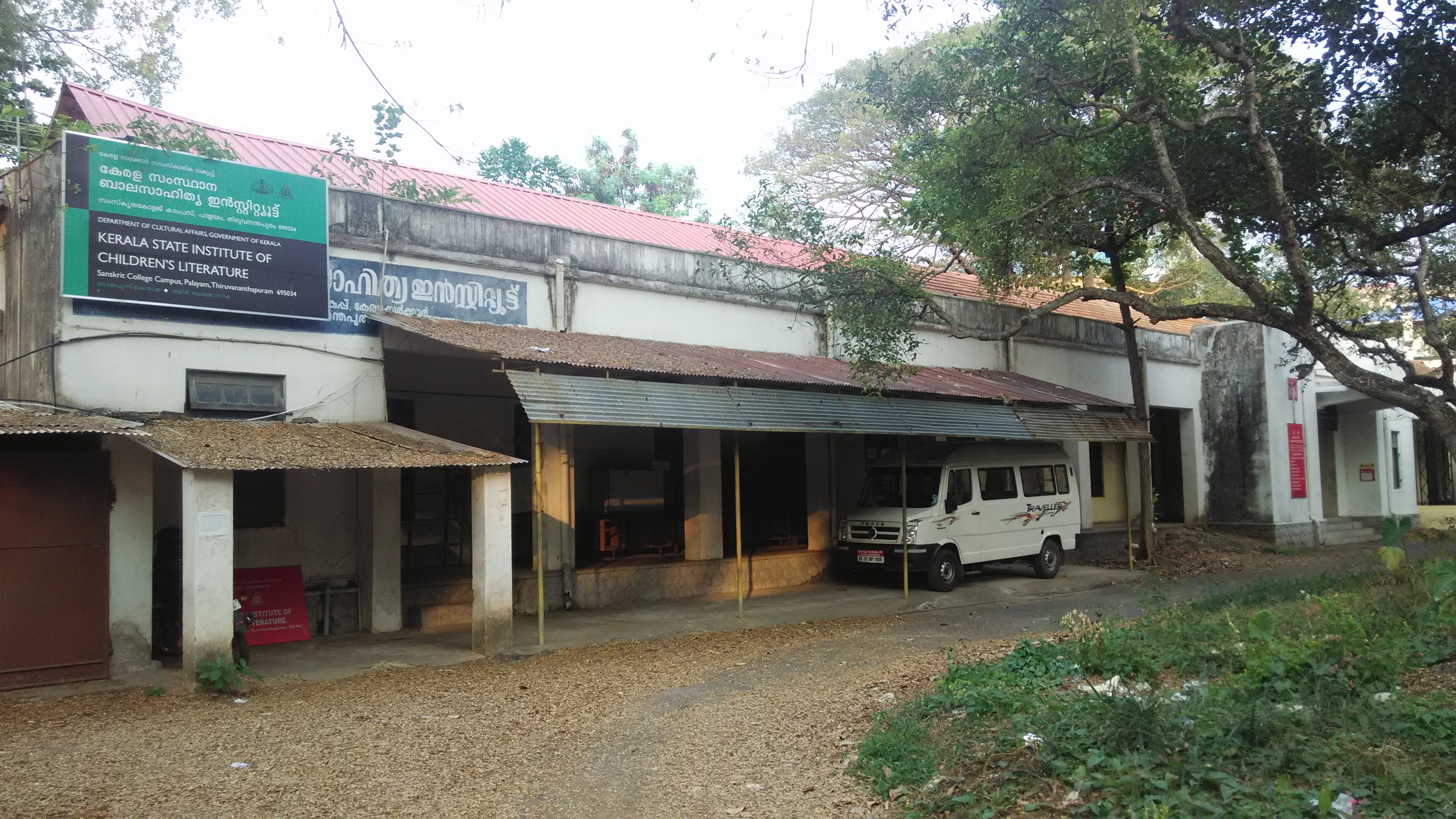
The institute's office at Balasahitya, in 2017

Kerala State Institute for Children's Literature (KSICL) is an Institution under the Department of Cultural Affairs of Kerala, India. It was constituted in 1981 for publishing children's literature books and magazines. The institute published its first book in 1981 named Nambooriyachanum Manthravum, by P. Narendranath. The institute also publishes a children's magazine titled Thaliru. Palliyara Sreedharan is the present director of this institute.

== See also ==
- C. G. Santhakumar Award
