= Kerala Sahitya Akademi Award =

Literary award given to Malayalam writers

- Current: 2024 Kerala Sahitya Akademi Awards
- Country: India
- Presented by: Kerala Sahitya Akademi
- First award: 1958
- Website: www.keralasahityaakademi.org

Kerala Sahitya Akademi Award has been given each year since 1958 by the Kerala Sahitya Akademi (Kerala Literary Academy) to Malayalam poets and authors for outstanding works of literary merit. The awards are given in various categories. The Kerala Sahitya Akademi Fellowship is also awarded to induct Malayalam writers as distinguished members of the Akademi.

== Awards ==
- Kerala Sahitya Akademi Award for Poetry
- Kerala Sahitya Akademi Award for Novel
- Kerala Sahitya Akademi Award for Story
- Kerala Sahitya Akademi Award for Drama
- Kerala Sahitya Akademi Award for Literary Criticism
- Kerala Sahitya Akademi Award for Biography and Autobiography
- Kerala Sahitya Akademi Award for Travelogue
- Kerala Sahitya Akademi Award for Humour
- Kerala Sahitya Akademi Award for Translation
- Kerala Sahitya Akademi Award for Children's Literature
- Kerala Sahitya Akademi Award for Scholarly Literature
- Kerala Sahitya Akademi Award for Overall Contributions
- Kerala Sahitya Akademi Fellowship
- Kerala Sahitya Akademi Award for Miscellaneous Works

== Awards by year ==
- 2024 Kerala Sahitya Akademi Awards (Announced in 2025)
- 2023 Kerala Sahitya Akademi Awards (Announced in 2024)
- 2022 Kerala Sahitya Akademi Awards (Announced in 2023)
- 2021 Kerala Sahitya Akademi Awards (Announced in 2022)
- 2020 Kerala Sahitya Akademi Awards (Announced in 2021)
- 2019 Kerala Sahitya Akademi Awards (Announced in 2021)
- 2018 Kerala Sahitya Akademi Awards (Announced in 2019)
- 2017 Kerala Sahitya Akademi Awards (Announced in 2019)
- 2016 Kerala Sahitya Akademi Awards (Announced in 2018)
- 2015 Kerala Sahitya Akademi Awards
- 2014 Kerala Sahitya Akademi Awards
- 2013 Kerala Sahitya Akademi Awards
- 2012 Kerala Sahitya Akademi Awards
- 2011 Kerala Sahitya Akademi Awards
- 2010 Kerala Sahitya Akademi Awards

== See also ==
- List of Malayalam literary awards
- List of Sahitya Akademi Award winners for Malayalam
