= List of Malayalam literary awards =

This is a list of literary awards given for Malayalam–language.

== Akkitham Award ==
Akkitham Award was established in 2021 by Thapasya Kala Sahithya Vedhi in memory of prominent poet Akkitham Achuthan Namboothiri. The award carries a cash prize of Rs 1 lakh, a plaque and a certificate.

Year	Recipient	Ref.
2021	M. T. Vasudevan Nair	
2022	Sreekumaran Thampi	
2023	K. P. Sankaran	
2026	V. Madhusoodanan Nair	

== Ashitha Memorial Literary Award ==
Ashitha Memorial Literary Award (Ashitha Smaraka Sahitya Puraskaram) was established in 2022 in memory of writer Ashitha. The award carries a cash prize of Rs 25,000 and a citation.

Year	Recipient	Ref.
2022	Santhosh Aechikkanam	
2023	Subhash Chandran	
2024	Sarah Joseph	
2025	M. Mukundan	
2026	K. P. Mohanan	

== Ayyappan Puraskaram ==
The Ayanam – A. Ayyappan Poetry Award was instituted by Ayanam Samskarika Vedi (Ayanam Cultural Forum) in the memory of celebrated Malayalam poet A. Ayyappan.

Year	Recipient	Work	Ref.
2011	Vijayalakshmi	Vijayalakshmiyude Kavithakal	
2012	P. N. Gopikrishnan	Idikkaloori Panampattadi	
2013	Kalpatta Narayanan	Oru Mudanthante Suvishesham	
2014	K. R. Tony	Plamenammayi	
2015	NA	NA	
2016	Veerankutty	Veerankuttyude Kavithakal	
2017	Kureepuzha Sreekumar	Uppa	
2018	K. V. Baby	K. V. Babyude Kavithakal	
2019	P. Raman	Rathri Pantrandarakku Oru Tharattu	
2020	Anwar Ali	Mehaboob Express	
2022	M. S. Banesh	Perakkavadi	
2023	Anitha Thampi	Muringa Vazha Kariveppu	
2024	T. P. Vinod	Sathyamayum Lokame	
2025	P. A. Nazimudin	Deivathinoppam Oru Picnic	

== Balamani Amma Award ==
Balamani Amma Award was established by the Kochi International Book Festival Committee in memory of prominent poetess Balamani Amma. The award is for lifetime achievement in language and literature and includes Rs 50,000 and a citation.

Year	Recipient	Ref.
2004	Sugathakumari	
2005	M. Leelavathy	
2006	Kovilan	
2007	—	
2008	Kakkanadan	
2009	Vishnunarayanan Namboothiri	
2010	M. P. Veerendra Kumar	
2011	C. Radhakrishnan	
2012	Yusuf Ali Kechery	
2013	P. Valsala	
2014	M. T. Vasudevan Nair	
2015	M. Achuthan	
2016	S. Ramesan Nair	
2017	K. L. Mohana Varma	
2018	Sreekumaran Thampi	
2019	T. Padmanabhan	
2020	No award	
2021	M. K. Sanu	
2022	V. Madhusoodanan Nair	
2023	M. Thomas Mathew	
2024	Chathanath Achuthanunni	

== Basheer Award ==
Basheer Award was instituted by Vaikom Muhammad Basheer Smaraka Trust and consists of an amount of ₹ 50,000, a certificate of merit, and a plaque designed by C. N. Karunakaran.

Year	Recipient	Work(s)
2008	N. Prabhakaran	Thiranhedutha Kathakal (Stories)
2009	Rafeeq Ahammed	Aalmara (Poetry)
2010	Sarah Joseph	Ooru Kaaval (Novel)
2011	B. Rajeevan	Vakkukalum Vasthukkalum (Criticism)
2012	N. S. Madhavan	Ente Priyapetta Kathakal (Stories)
2013	Attoor Ravi Varma	Attoor Kavithakal (Poetry)
2014	Subhash Chandran	Manushyanu Oru Aamukham (Novel)
2015	Kalpatta Narayanan	Kavithayude Jeevacharithram (Criticism)
2016	Ashitha	Ashithayude Kathakal (Stories)
2017	Sebastian	Prethi Shareeram (Poetry)
2018	V. J. James	Nireeshwaran (Novel)
2019	T. Padmanabhan	Maraya (Stories)
2020	M. K. Sanu	Durantha Natakam: Ajayyathayute Amarasangeetham (Criticism)
2021	K. Satchidanandan	Dukham Enna Veedu (Poetry)
2022	M. Mukundan	Nritham Cheyyunna Kudakal (Novel)
2023	E. Santhosh Kumar	Narakangalude Upama (Stories)
2024	P. N. Gopikrishnan	Kavitha Mamsabhojiyanu (Poetry)
2025	S. Hareesh	Pattunoolppuzhu (Novel)

== C. G. Santhakumar Award ==
C. G. Santhakumar Award is instituted by the Kerala State Institute of Children's Literature for overall contributions of a writer to children's literature in Malayalam. The award carries a cash prize of Rs 60,000, a plaque and a certificate.

Year	Recipient	Ref.
1998	Kunjunni Mash	
1999	Sumangala	
2000	Prof. S. Sivadas	
2004	Palliyara Sreedharan	
2006	K. Thayat	
2007	Sugathakumari	
2009	Sippy Pallippuram	
2011	K. V. Ramanadhan	
2015	K. Sreekumar	
2017	Sooranad Ravi	
2017	T. K. D. Muzhappilangad	
2019	P. P. K. Pothuval	
2021	Malayath Appunni	
2022	Payyannur Kunhiraman	
2023	Ullala Babu	

== C. V. Sreeraman Award ==
The Ayanam - C. V. Sreeraman Award for Story was instituted in 2008 by Ayanam Samskarika Vedi (Ayanam Cultural Forum) in memory of Malayalam writer C. V. Sreeraman. The winners of the award are:

Year	Recipient	Work(s)	Ref.
2008	V. R. Sudheesh	—	
2009	Asokan Charuvil	—	
2009	K. P. Ramanunni	Thiranjedutha Kathakal	
2010	Ambikasuthan Mangad	—	
2011	Unni R.	Kottayam 17	
2012	U. K. Kumaran	—	
2013	Vaisakhan	—	
2014	P. K. Parakkadavu	Thiranjedutha Kathakal	
2015	Pramod Raman	Drishtichaver	
2016	U. A. Khader	—	
2017	E. P. Sreekumar	Adhwanavetta	
2018	C. S. Chandrika	Ente Pachakkarimbe	
2019	Shihabuddin Poythumkadavu	Oru Paattinte Dooram	
2021	Santhosh Echikkanam	Kavana	
2022	V. K. Deepa	Woman Eaters	
2023	Shanoj R. Chandran	Kalodinja Punyalan	
2024	Sithara S.	Amlam	

== Deshabhimani Award ==
Deshabhimani Award is an annual award instituted by Deshabhimani for overall contribution in social, cultural and literary fields. The award was instituted in 2017 as part of the Platinum Jubilee celebrations of Deshabhimani. The award carries a prize of Rs 2 lakh.

Year	Recipient	Ref.
2017	M. T. Vasudevan Nair	
2018	T. Padmanabhan	
2019	K. J. Yesudas	
2020	NA	
2021	NA	
2022	Adoor Gopalakrishnan	
2023	M. K. Sanu	
2024	NA	
2025	M. Leelavathy	
2026	Anand	

== Deshabhimani Literary Award ==
Deshabhimani Literary Award is an annual award presented by Deshabhimani. Instituted in 2017 during the Platinum Jubilee celebrations of Deshabhimani, this award honours literary works that have been published as first editions within the preceding two years. The award is given in three categories—novel, story and poetry—and carries a prize of Rs 1 lakh in each category.

Year	Category	Recipient	Work	Ref.
2016	Novel	M. Mukundan	Kuda Nannakkunna Choyi	
2016	Story	Aymanam John	Aymanam Johninte Kathakal	
2016	Poetry	K. V. Ramakrishnan	Kalasakshikal	
2016	Miscellaneous	T. R. Raghavan	Indian Kappalottathinte Charitram	
2017	Novel	Rajendran Edathumkara	Njanum Budhanum	
2017	Story	Ambikasuthan Mangad	Ente Priyapetta Kathakal	
2017	Poetry	P. Raman	Rathri Pantrandarakku Oru Tharattu	
2019	Novel	S. Hareesh	Meesa	
2019	Story	Asokan Charuvil	Asokan Charuvilinte Kathakal	
2019	Poetry	K. Satchidanandan	Pakshikal Ente Pirake Varunnu	
2022	Novel	T. D. Ramakrishnan	Pacha Manja Chuvappu	
2022	Story	V. K. Deepa	Women Eaters	
2022	Poetry	Vishnuprasad	Nrithasala	
2023	Novel	V. Shinilal	Iru	
2023	Story	Unni R.	Thiruvilayadal	
2023	Poetry	Ravunni	Mattudeshathe Kallezhuthukal	
2025	Novel	P. V. Shajikumar	Maranavamsam	
2025	Story	N. Prabhakaran	Oru Pidi Uppu	
2025	Poetry	P. N. Gopikrishnan	Thakarnna Palli Aanu Valiya Palli	

== Deviprasadam Trust Award ==
Deviprasadam Trust or the OMC Trust is established in the memory of Sanskrit scholar O. M. C. Narayanan Nambudiripadby his son Sri O N Damodaran Nambudiripad in 1990. Since 1990, the Trust gives awards in various disciplines such as Sanskrit, Vedanta, Music, Malayalam literature, and Kathakali. The award for literature has been given since 1997.

1997	P. Bhaskaran
1998	M. R. Bhattathiripad
1999	Thikkodiyan
2000	Akkitham Achuthan Namboothiri
2001	Yusufali Kechery
2002	O. N. V. Kurup
2003	C. Radhakrishnan
2004	M. Leelavathy
2005	Vishnunarayanan Namboothiri
2006	Sugathakumari
2007	M. N. Paloor
2008	K. P. Sankaran
2009	K. B. Sreedevi
2010	Attoor Ravi Varma
2014	M. T. Vasudevan Nair
2015	K. V. Ramakrishnan
2016	T. Padmanabhan
2017	M. K. Sanu

== Federal Bank Literary Award ==
The Federal Bank Literary Award (Federal Bank Sahitya Puraskaram) was instituted by Federal Bank in 2022 to recognise literary works in Malayalam. The award carries a prize of Rs 1 lakh and is distributed during the Kerala Literature Festival.

Year	Recipient	Work(s)	Ref.
2022	K. Venu	Oranweshananthinte Katha (Autobiography)	
2023	Sarah Joseph	Kara (Novel)	
2024	E. Santhosh Kumar	Thapomayiyude Achan (Novel)	
2025	K. Sreekumar	M. T. Vasudevan Nair (Biography)	

== Jnanpith Award (Jnanapeetam) ==
Jnanpith Award, India's most prestigious literary honour, was won by the following Malayalam authors.

Year	Portrait	Recipient	Work(s)
1965		G. Sankara Kurup	Odakkuzhal
1980		S. K. Pottekkatt	Oru Desathinte Katha
1984		Thakazhi Sivasankara Pillai	Kayar
1995		M. T. Vasudevan Nair	Overall contribution
2007		O. N. V. Kurup	Overall contribution
2019		Akkitham Achuthan Namboothiri	Overall contribution

== Kadammanitta Ramakrishnan Award ==
Kadammanitta Ramakrishnan Award was established in 2015 by Kadammanitta Ramakrishnan Foundation in memory of prominent poet Kadammanitta Ramakrishnan. The award carries a cash prize of Rs 55,555 and a citation.

Year	Recipient	Ref.
2015	O. N. V. Kurup	
2016	Ashok Vajpeyi	
2017	V. Madhusoodanan Nair	
2018	Chandrashekhara Kambara	
2019	Sugathakumari	
2020	K. G. Sankara Pillai	
2023	Prabha Varma	
2024	Rafeeq Ahamed	
2025	M. Leelavathy	
2026	Ezhacherry Ramachandran	

== Kerala Kalamandalam Kalagrandham Award ==
Kerala Kalamandalam 'Kalagrandham' Award by the Kerala Kalamandalam Deemed University is an annual award given to the author of the best book for art literature. The award carries a cash prize of Rs 30000, a plaque, ponnada and a certificate. The award was won by the following authors.

Year	Recipient	Work(s)	Ref.
2013	K. G. Paulose	Kadhayum Kalapathinte Akhoshangalum	
2015	T.S. Madhavankutty	Kali Kadakkapuram	
2017	Njayath Balan	Kalluvazhichittayude Kavalal	
2018	Kalamandalam Gopi	Nalacharitha Prabhavam	
2019	Kottakkal Sasidharan	Pakarnnattam	
2021	C R Santhosh	Natyasasthrathile Rasabhavangal	
2022	Pallipuram Unnikrishnan	Kathakaliyute Aniyara Lokam	
2023	Erickavu N. Sunil	Resounding Mridangam	

== Kamala Surayya Award ==
Year	Recipient	Work	Ref.
2010	Savithri Rajeevan	Savithri Rajeevante Kavithakal (Poetry)	
2010	Vaisakhan	Silencer (Short story collection)	
2011	K. G. Sankara Pillai	Orma Kondu Thurakkavunna Vathilukal (Poetry)	
2011	Punathil Kunjabdulla	Ente Kamukimarum Mattu Kathakalum (Short story collection)	
2012	O. N. V. Kurup	Dinantham (Poetry)	
2012	M. Mukundan	Delhi Gadhakal (Novel)	

== Kendra Sahitya Akademi Award for Children's Literature (Bal Sahitya Puraskar) ==
The following are the winners of Bal Sahitya Puraskar, awarded annually by Sahitya Akademi for children's literature.

Year	Recipient	Work	Ref.
2010	Sippy Pallippuram	Oridath Oridath Oru Kunjunni	
2011	K. Pappootty	Chiruthakkuttiyum Mashum	
2012	K. Sreekumar	Overall contribution	
2013	Leela Nambudiripad (Sumangala)	Overall contribution	
2014	K. V. Ramanadhan	Overall contribution	
2015	S. Sivadas	Overall contribution	
2016	N. P. Hafiz Mohamad	Kuttippattalathinte Keralaparyadanam	
2017	S. R. Lal	Kunhunniyude Yathrapusthakam	
2018	P. K. Gopi	Olachoottintte Velicham	
2019	Malayath Appunni	Overall contribution	
2020	Gracy	Vazhthappetta Poocha	
2021	Raghunath Paleri	Avar Moovarum Oru Mazhavillum	
2022	Sethu	Chekkutty	
2023	Priya A. S.	Perumazhayathe Kunjithalukal	
2024	Unni Ammayambalam	Algorithangalude Nadu	
2025	Sreejith Moothedath	Penguinukalute Vankarayil	

== Kunjunni Award ==
Kunjunni Award is given by Balasahiti Prakashan, the publication wing of Balagokulam, in memory of poet Kunjunni Mash. The award carries a cash prize of Rs 25,000, a plaque and a certificate.

Year	Recipient	Ref.
2013	P. I. Sankaranarayanan	
2016	P. K. Gopi	
2020	P. P. Sreedharanunni	
2021	Gopi Puthukode	
2022	Gopinath Muthukad	
2023	Mani K. Chenthapure	
2024	Malayath Appunni	
2025	Sreekala Chingoli	
2026	K. G. Raghunath	

== Lalithambika Antharjanam Smaraka Sahitya Award ==
The award, instituted in the memory of Lalithambika Antharjanam, was given in two categories: one for lifetime contribution to Malayalam literature (Rs 30,001 and a bronze memento) and the other for a promising young woman writer (Rs 5,000). The award was given by the Lalithambika Antharjanam Memorial Trust which was established in 1989 in Ramapuram, Kottayam.

- 1992: Vaikkom Muhammad Basheer, B. M. Suhara
- 1993: Balamani Amma, Vijayalakshmi
- 1994: Sukumar Azhikode, Ashita
- 1995: S. Guptan Nair, Gracy
- 1996: Akkitham Achuthan Namboothiri, Shobha Warrier
- 1997: N. P. Mohammed, K. P. Sudheera
- 1998: T. Padmanabhan, S. Lakshmi Devi
- 1999: M. Leelavathi, Rosemary
- 2000: K. T. Muhammed, Geetha
- 2001: Sugathakumari, Prameela Devi
- 2002: Ponkunnam Varkey, Mayadevi
- 2003: M. T. Vasudevan Nair, A. S. Priya
- 2004: C. Radhakrishnan, K. R. Meera

== Malayattoor Award (2006–present) ==
The literary prize was instituted in 2006 by Malayattoor Smaraka Samithi in the name of writer Malayattoor Ramakrishnan. It consists of a cash prize of ₹25,000, a citation, and statuette.

Year	Recipient	Work	Ref.
2006	Perumbadavam Sreedharan	Narayanam	
2007	K. P. Ramanunni	Jeevithathinte Pusthakam	
2008	NA	NA	—
2009	NA	NA	—
2010	N. Prabhakaran	Janakatha	
2011	NA	NA	—
2012	Unnikrishnan Thiruvazhiyode	Rathi Rathya	
2013	Prabha Varma	Shyama Madhavam	
2014	NA	NA	—
2015	V. Madhusoodanan Nair	Achchan Piranna Veedu	
2016	T. D. Ramakrishnan	Sugandhi Enna Andal Devanayaki	
2017	Satheesh Babu Payyannur	Khamarunnisayude Koottukari	
2019	Zacharia	Then	
2020	George Onakkoor	Hridaya Raagangal	
2021	Sajil Sreedhar	Vasavadatha	
2022	Benyamin	Nishabda Sancharangal	
2023	Sarah Joseph	Esther	
2024	E. Santhosh Kumar	Thapomayiyude Achan	

== Malayattoor Award (2022–present) ==
The literary prize was instituted in 2022 by Malayattoor Foundation in the name of writer Malayattoor Ramakrishnan. The first Malayattoor Award was awarded on 30 May 2022, the 95th Birth Anniversary of Malayattoor. The award includes a cash prize of Rs. 25,000, a statue and a citation.

Year	Recipient	Work	Ref.
2022	Subhash Chandran	Samudrashila	
2023	V. J. James	Anticlock	
2025	Ambikasuthan Mangad	Allohalan	

== N. V. Krishna Warrier Award ==
The literary prize was instituted in the name of writer N. V. Krishna Warrier.

Year	Recipient	Work	Ref.
1993	Olappamanna	Jalakapakshi	
1994	M. P. Sankunni Nair	Chathravum Chamaravum	
1995	M. Mukundan	Daivathinte Vikrithikal	
1996	Madhavikutty	Nashtapetta Neelambari	
1997	Balamani Amma	Nivedyam	
1998	M. Leelavathy	Adipraroopangal Sahithyathil	
1999	Kovilan	Thattakam	
2000	M. T. Vasudevan Nair	Sherlock	

== Nalappadan Award ==
The literary prize was instituted in the name of writer Nalapat Narayana Menon.

Year	Recipient	Work	Ref.
1989	Mullanezhi	Naranath Prathan	
1990	Puzhankara Balanarayanan	Ardhanagnar	
1991	N. Mohanan	Sheshapathram	
1992	Vayala Vasudevan Pillai	Oru Pakshikunjinte Maranam	
1993	M. Leelavathy	Adipraroopangal Sahithyathil	
1994	O. N. V. Kurup	Ujjayini	
1996	Anand	Govardhande Yathrakal	
1998	E. Harikumar	Sookshichu Vacha Mayilpeeli	
1999	M. P. Veerendra Kumar	Prathibhayude Verukal Thedi	
2000	K. B. Sreedevi	Chanakkallu	
2001	Yusufali Kechery	Mukhapadamillathe	

== Nooranad Haneef Award ==
The literary prize is instituted in the name of writer Nooranad Haneef. It consists of a cash prize of ₹ 25,001 and citation and is given for writers under the age of 45.

Year	Recipient	Work	Ref.
2011	V. M. Devadas	Pannivetta	
2012	E. Santhosh Kumar		
2013	K. R. Meera	Aarachaar	
2014	Benyamin	Manjaveyil Maranangal	
2015	Susmesh Chandroth	Paper Lodge	
2016	Shemi	Nadavaziyile Nerukal	
2017	Sangeetha Sreenivasan	Acid	
2018	Sonia Rafeeq	Herbarium	
2019	G. R. Indugopan	Padinjare Kollam Chorakkalam	
2020	V. Shinilal	Sambarkkakranthi	
2021	Yasar Arafath	Mutharkunnile Musallakal	
2022	Nisha Anilkumar	Avadhootharude Adayalangal	
2023	K. N. Prashanth	Ponam	
2024	M. P. Lijin Raj	Margarita	
2025	Farsana	Elma	
2026	Aishwarya Kamala	Virus	

== P. Kunhiraman Nair Award ==
Year	Recipient	Work(s)
1997	K. Satchidanandan	Malayalam
1998	Prabha Varma	Chandana Nazhi
1999	Puthussery Ramachandran	Utsava Bali
2000	Desamangalam Ramakrishnan	Maravi Ezhuthunnathu
2001	Vijayalakshmi	Mazhathan Mattetho Mukham
2002	O. N. V. Kurup	Ee Purathana Kinnaram
2003	D. Vinayachandran	Samasthakeralam P. O.
2004	Chemmanam Chacko	Ottayal Pattalam
2005	Attoor Ravi Varma	Attoor Ravi Varmayude Kavithakal – Bhaagam 2
2006	K. Ayyappa Paniker	K. Ayyappa Panikerude Kavithakal
2007	Sugathakumari	Manalezhuthu
2008	Vishnunarayanan Namboothiri	Uttarayanam
2009	P. K. Gopi	Sushumnayile Sangeetham
2010	Ettumanoor Somadasan	Jalasamadhi
2011	C. Radhakrishnan	NA
2012	Attoor Ravi Varma	NA
2013	P. P. Ramachandran	Katte Kadale

== Puthoor Award ==
Puthoor Award was established by Unnikrishnan Puthoor Memorial Trust and Foundation in memory of writer Unnikrishnan Puthoor. The award carries a cash prize of Rs 11,111, a statuette designed by J. R. Prasad and a certificate.

Year	Recipient	Ref.
2016	M. Leelavathy	
2019	M. T. Vasudevan Nair	
2020	Akkitham Achuthan Namboothiri	
2021	Sreekumaran Thampi	
2023	George Onakkoor	
2024	Vaisakhan	
2025	U. K. Kumaran	
2026	K. P. Ramanunni	

== S. Guptan Nair Award ==
The Prof. S. Guptan Nair Award was instituted in 2007 by Prof S. Guptan Nair Foundation, to honour Malayalam scholar S. Guptan Nair. The award carries Rs. 25,000 in cash and a citation. Some of the recipients of the award are listed below.

Year	Recipient	Ref.
2007	Dr. M. Leelavathy	
2011	Dr. M. V. Vishnu Namboothiri	
2015	Puthussery Ramachandran	
2017	Prof. M. K. Sanu	
2019	Prof. K. P. Sankaran	
2022	Dr. M. M. Basheer	
2026	Prof. V. R. Prabodhachandran Nayar	

== Samastha Kerala Sahithya Parishad Award ==
Samastha Kerala Sahithya Parishad is an organisation established in 1926 (as Sahithya Samajam). The Samastha Kerala Sahithya Parishad Award was established in 1988. The award was given to individual works published in Malayalam but since 2004, it is given for the overall contribution of a writer in Malayalam literature.

Year	Recipient	Work	Ref.
1988	T. Padmanabhan	Kalabhairavan	
1989	Punathil Kunjabdulla	Kanyavanangal	
1990	Balamani Amma	Thiranjedutha Kavithakal	
1991	Anand	Marubhoomikal Undakunnathu	
1992	Ayyappa Paniker	Ayyappa Panikerude Kavithakal	
1994	N. P. Mohammed	Daivathinte Kannu	
1995	Thikkodiyan	Arangu Kanatha Nadan	
1996	Madhavikutty	Neermathalam Pootha Kalam	
1998	Kovilan	Thattakam	
1999	O. V. Vijayan	Thalamurakal	
2001	C. V. Sreeraman	C. V. Sreeramante Kathakal	
2002	Mundur Krishnankutty	Enne Veruthe Vittalum	
2004	M. T. Vasudevan Nair	—	
2004	Sukumar Azhikode	—	
2004	O.N.V. Kurup	—	
2004	Vaikom Chandrasekharan Nair	—	
2004	Kakkanadan	—	
2008	Akkitham Achuthan Namboothiri	—	
2009	M. Leelavathy	—	
2010	Vishnunarayanan Namboothiri	—	
2011	M. K. Sanu	—	
2012	K. Satchidanandan	—	
2015	Sugathakumari	—	
2019	Sethu	—	
2020	N. S. Madhavan	—	
2021	Sreekumaran Thampi	—	
2022	M. Thomas Mathew	—	
2023		—	
2024	V. Madhusoodanan Nair	—	

== Saraswati Samman ==
Saraswati Samman was instituted in 1991 by the K. K. Birla Foundation for outstanding prose or poetry works in any of the Indian languages. The award was won by the following Malayalam authors.

Year	Recipient	Work(s)	Ref.
1995	Balamani Amma	Nivedyam (Poetry collection)	
2005	Ayyappa Paniker	Ayyappa Panikerude Kritikal (Poetry collection)	
2012	Sugathakumari	Manalezhuthu (Poetry collection)	
2023	Prabha Varma	Roudra Sathwikam (Novel in verse)	

== Thakazhi Award ==
The award was instituted by Thakazhi Smaraka Samiti and Department of Cultural Affairs, Government of Kerala in the memory of renowned writer Thakazhi Sivasankara Pillai. The award consists of Rs.50,000, a citation and a plaque.The award is given for a writer's overall contributions to Malayalam literature.

Year	Recipient	Ref.
2015	M. T. Vasudevan Nair	
2016	C. Radhakrishnan	
2017	NA	
2018	T. Padmanabhan	
2020	Sreekumaran Thampi	
2021	Perumbadavam Sreedharan	
2022	M. Leelavathy	
2023	M. Mukundan	
2024	M. K. Sanu	
2026	Sethu	

== Thanima Puraskaram ==
The award was instituted in 2009 by Calicut-based Thanima Kala Sahithya Vedi, a literary organisation founded in 1991. Seminal works in a specific literary genre are considered for the award each year.

Year	Recipient	Work	Category
2009	Jayarathnam Paatyam	Six Days More	Screenplay
2010	Rasheed Parakkal	Oru Thakkali Krishikkarante Swapnangal	Novel
2011	J. Anil Kumar	Bibleil Krishnan, Mayilppeeli, Pranayam	Short story
2012	Sulfikar	Marannu Vacha Kudakal	Poem
2013	Dr. B. Balachandran	Keraleeya Vasthra Paramparyam	Scholarly literature
2014	Radhakrishnan Perambra	Red Alert	Drama
2015	E. M. Sakeer Hussain	Jerusaleminte Suvisheham	Spiritual literature
2016	Abubakkar Kappadu	Chollum Chelum	Children's literature
2017	Dr. K. T. Jaleel	Malabar Kalapam Oru Punar Vayana	History
2018	V. N. Prasannan	P. Gangadharan: Nishkasithanaya Navothana Nayakan	Biography
2019	Prasanth Babu Kaithapram	Derappan	Novel
2020	P. A. Aboobacker	Arabi Malayalam: Malayalathinte Classical Bhavangal	Scholarly literature
2021	Ambikasuthan Mangad	Yokoso Japan Viseshangal	Travelogue
2022	Sunu A. V.	Indian Poocha	Short story
2023	Deepak P.	Nirmmithabuddhikalathe Samoohika Rashtreeya Jeevitham	Technology studies

== Thoppil Bhasi Award ==
Year	Recipient	Ref.
2011	O. N. V. Kurup	
2012	K. P. A. C. Lalitha	
2013	Thomas Jacob	
2014	NA	—
2015	Kavalam Narayana Panicker	
2016	Puthussery Ramachandran	
2017	Sreenivasan	
2018	Raghavan	
2019	Manoj Narayanan	
2022	Sujith Nair	
2023	Madhu	
2024	Perumbadavam Sreedharan	

== Bookshelf Sahithya Sreshta Puraskaram ==
Year	Recipient
2023	K K Sudhakaran
2025	Adam Ayub

== V. T. Kumaran Award ==
Year	Recipient	Work	Ref.
1987	Prabha Varma	—	
1988	T. P. Rajeevan	—	
1989	Divakaran Vishnumangalam	—	
1990	K. Rajagopalan	—	
1991	P. P. Ramachandran	—	
1991	Valsan Vathussery	—	
1992	Gireesh Puliyoor	—	
1993	K. S. Ajith	—	
1994	Sindhu Bhaskaran	—	
1995	V. R. Santhosh	—	
1996	Vandana V.	—	
1997	A. C. Sreehari	—	
1998	Azeem Thannimoodu	—	
1999	Kanimol	—	
2001	Lopa R.	—	
2004	Arya Gopi	—	
2006	Anuja Akathoottu	—	
2007	Abdul Salam	—	
2008	Surya Binoy	—	
2009	Unni Sreedalam	—	
2010	K. M. Pramod	—	
2011	S. Kalesh	—	
2012	Kalpatta Narayanan	—	
2013	K. R. Tony	—	
2015	M. Jayaraj	Malayala Achadimadhyamam: Boothavum Varthamanavum	
2016	A. K. Abdul Hakim	Silayil Theertha Smarakangal (Ed.)	
2018	K. V. Sarathchandran	Vithakkunnavante Upama	

== Vaikom Chandrasekharan Nair Award ==
Vaikom Chandrasekharan Nair Award was instituted by the Sharjah chapter of Yuvakalasahithy UAE in memory of writer Vaikom Chandrasekharan Nair. The 12th edition of the award, which carries a cash prize of Rs 25,000 and a certificate, was announced in 2024.

Year	Recipient	Work	Ref.
2012	U. K. Kumaran	Thakshankunnu Swaroopam	
2016	Alankode Leelakrishnan	NA	
2021	K. K. Kochu	Dalitan	
2023	C. Radhakrishnan	Overall contribution	
2024	P. N. Gopikrishnan	Hindutva Rashtreeyathinte Katha	
