= Innu (disambiguation) =

The Innu are an ethnic group of Canada.

Innu may also refer to:

- Innu language, an Algonquian language
- Innu Magazine, a magazine of Kerala, India
- Innu (album), a 1991 album by Canadian band Kashtin

== See also ==
- Inu (disambiguation)
