= Shelvy =

Indian Poet, Publisher, Writer (1960-2003)

Shelvy (1960 – 21 August 2003) was an Indian publisher, poet, novelist and short story writer in Malayalam–language. He owned the Calicut-based Mulberry Publications, a renowned publication house that promoted many new Malayalam authors and also introduced several great writers of foreign languages to Malayali readers.

== Early life ==
Shelvy Raj was born in 1960 as the son of Devassi and Clara in Orumanayur village in Trichur district in the state of Kerala, India. He completed his education in Orumanayur, Pavaratty and Palghat. He was interested in reading from childhood and was a regular visitor at the Township Library and the Devaswom Board Library in Guruvayur. As a child, he won awards for story, painting, drama directing, essay and speech. However, he did not receive much encouragement from his parents or relatives.

During adolescence, he wrote a few stories, inspired by the stories of Kakkanadan and others. He was dissatisfied with the writings and soon ventured into poetry. He considered poetry as an escape from loneliness, depression and suicidal tendencies of his youth. He published them in periodicals such as Prerana and Samkramanam. He was also the editor of campus magazine Kerala Samskaram.

In the early eighties, Shelvy along with his friend Mohandas (Shikha Mohandas) started Shikha Books in Guruvayur, which mainly published Malayalam translations of foreign titles. Shikha was the first to translate Gabriel García Márquez's works in Malayalam.

== Mulberry Publications ==
Shelvy started Mulberry Publications in 1985 with the help of his friend Daisy whom he later married. Mulberry's first publication was Moonnam Loka Katha which was an anthology of 12 shortstories from the Third World. Mulberry was based in Calicut and its headquarters at 25 Arya Bhavan, S. M. Street was a hub for several literary and cultural icons of Malayalam during the 1990s. Mulberry promoted many new authors and published a number of good quality Malayalam books. Shelvy took the initiative through Mulberry to promote reading through various club memberships and other subscription schemes. Mulberry also frequently published translations of foreign titles, introducing several great writers to Malayali readers. Mulberry translated the works of Nikos Kazantzakis, Kahlil Gibran, Federico García Lorca, Erich Fromm, Simone de Beauvoir, Irving Stone, Pablo Neruda, Franz Kafka, Friedrich Nietzsche, Jorge Luis Borges, Jiddu Krishnamurti, Colin Wilson and Osho among others. They also published works of several prominent Malayalam writers such as Satchidanandan, Nitya Chaitanya Yati, M. N. Vijayan, M. T. Vasudevan Nair, T. Padmanabhan, V. K. N., Punathil Kunjabdulla, C. V. Balakrishnan, P. Surendran, T. V. Kochubava, N. Prabhakaran, P. K. Parakkadavu, Kalpatta Narayanan, V. R. Sudheesh and Asha Menon. Some of the titles Mulberry published are Mrigasikshakan by Vijayalakshmi, Kochiyile Vrikshangal by K. G. Sankara Pillai, Christmas Marathinte Veru by Aymanam John and Euthanasia by Benyamin.

Mulberry won the International Darsana Award for High Quality Production three times. It also received the Akshara Puraskaram and Federation of Indian Publishers' Excellence in Book Production Award in 1998.

== Death ==
Shelvy committed suicide on 21 August 2003. It was reported that he was having financial problems. He was survived by his wife Daisy and only daughter Sulamitha. Daisy has written her reminiscences about him in her book Shelvi Enna Pusthakam (A book titled Shelvy).

== List of works ==
Poetry

- Nostalgia (1994)
- Alaukikam (1998)
- Shelviyude Kavithakal (2004)

Editor

- Bhoomiyude Manassil
- Orma
