= P. P. Ramachandran =

Indian writer

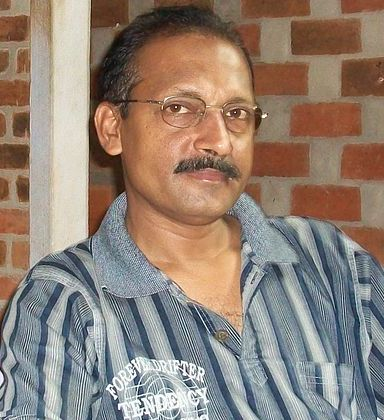
- Born: 1962 (age 63–64); Vattamkulam, Malappuram, Kerala, India
- Occupations: Poet, author, teacher
- Website: Website

P. P. Ramachandran is a Malayalam poet.

== Works ==
His poems are collected in two books, Kanekkane (Thrissur: Current Books) and Rantay Murichathu (Cut into Two) (Thrissur: Current Books).

== Awards ==
His collection Kanekkane won the Kerala Sahitya Akademi Award for Poetry in the year 2003. Katte Kadale won the P. Kunhiraman Nair Poetry Award in 2013. He received the Cherusseri Award in 2014. He has also received awards established in memory of V. T. Kumaran (1991), Cherukad (1995), Kunjupillai, Changampuzha and V. K. Unnikrishnan.

== Background ==
He is a high school teacher in A.V. High School, Ponnani. He lives in Vattamkulam, a small town in Malappuram district.
