= Arya Gopi =

Indian poet

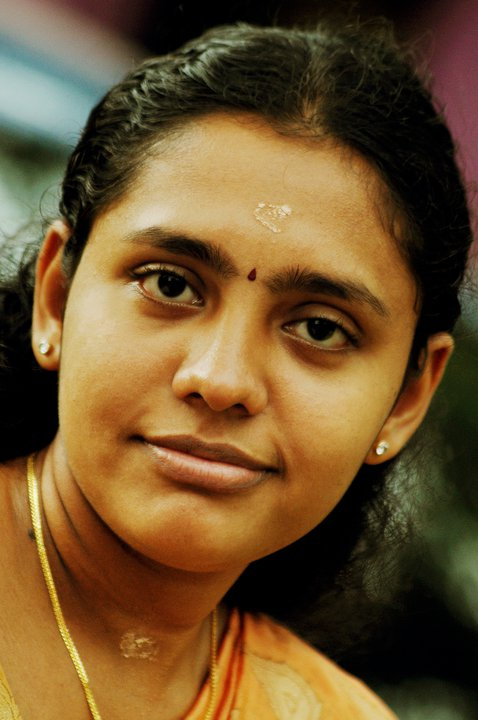
Arya Gopi

Arya Gopi is a Malayalali poet from India. She has written five books in Malayalam and one in English. She has won numerous awards and honours including the Kerala Sahithya Akademi Kanakasree Award, Kerala Government Youth Icon Award, Kerala State Youth Welfare Board Swami Vivekananda Yuva Pratibha Award, Vyloppilli Award, ONV International Yuva Award, Kakkad Award, VT Kumaran Master Award, etc.

== Biography ==
Born to noted Malayali poet P K Gopi and Komalam on March 28, Arya Gopi has published five books in two languages – Malakha Matsyam (Stories, 2003), Jeevante Vaakkukal (Poems, 2006), Ochezhuthu (2020). A regular face at literary events in Kerala, she recites poems at various programmes conducted by organisation such as Kendra/Kerala Sahitya Akademy, Mathrubhumi, Manorama, D C Books and Hindu dailies apart from various web and visual media.

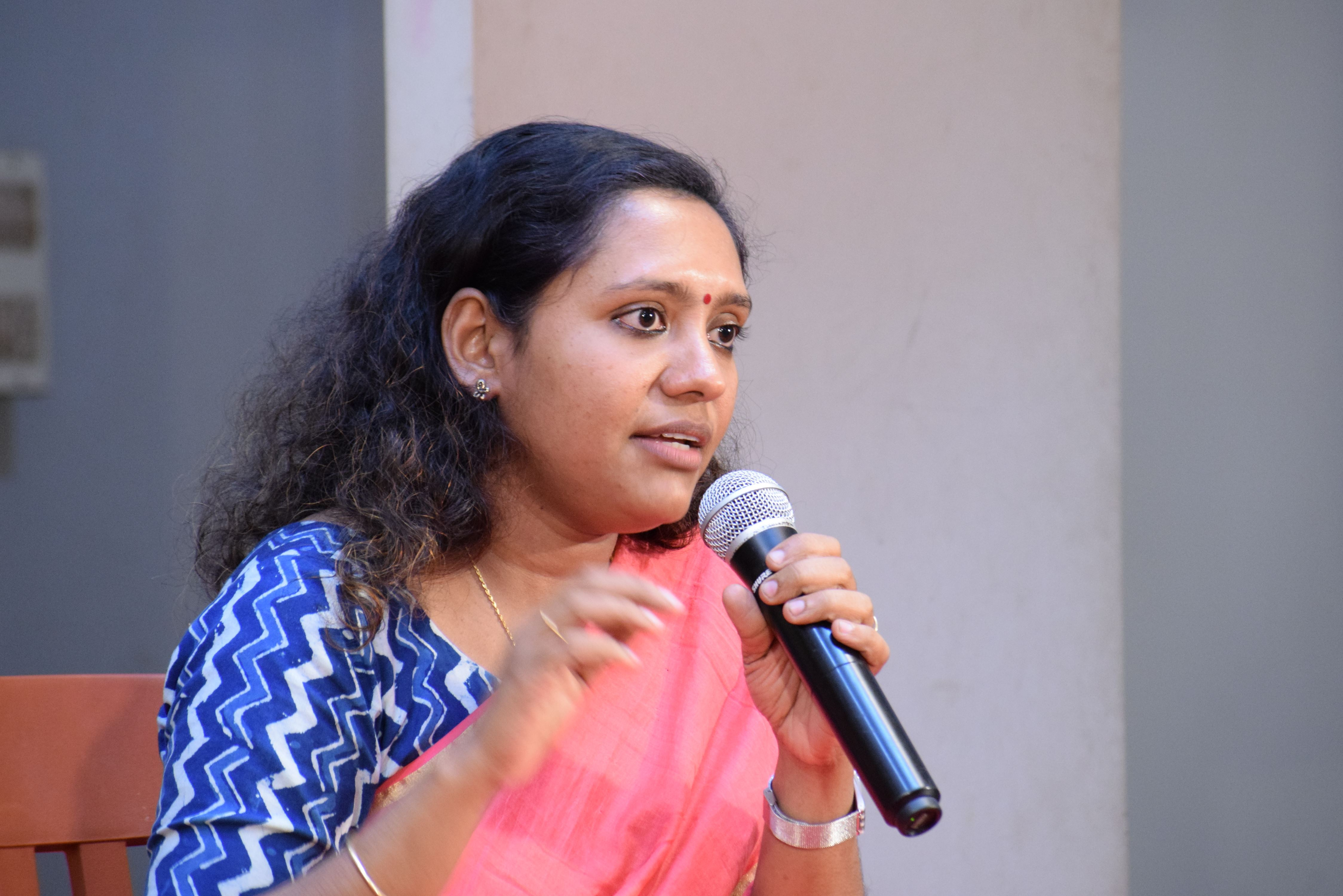
Arya Gopi speaking to students

A first rank holder in MA English language and literature from University of Calicut, Arya is now an assistant professor in English at Zamorin’s Guruvayurappan College, Kozhikode. She completed her PhD – Other India – A Socio Literary Analysis of Select Works of Mark Tully.

== Selected works ==
- Ochezhuthukal, Perakkabooks, Malappuram, 2020
- Jeevante Vakkukal (poems) D.C. Books, Kottayam, 2006
- Malakha Matsyam (stories) Poorna Publications, Calicut, 2003

== Awards and achievements ==
- 2004: V. T. Kumaran Award
