= Cherukad Award =

Award given for literary works in Malayalam

Cherukad Award is an annual award given for literary works in Malayalam. The award was instituted in 1978 by Cherukad Smaraka Trust at Perinthalmanna, Kerala, India. It is named after Malayalam playwright, poet, novelist, and political activist Cherukad Govinda Pisharodi. The award comprises ₹25,000 and a citation.

== List of awardees ==
Year	Recipient	Work(s)	Ref.
1978	K. S. Namboodiri	Pathanam	
1979	A. P. Kalaikkadu	Sankranti	
1980	K. M. Raghava Warrier	Usha Sandhya	
1981	A. S. Devadas	Marxist Vimarshanam	
1982	K. Thayat	Katha Urangunna Vazhikaliloode	
1983	C. V. Sreeraman	Vasthuhara	
1984	P. M. Taj	Kudukka Athava Vishakkunnavante Vedantam	
1985	N. N. Kakkad	Kavitha	
1986	M. K. Gangadharan	Kooduvittavar Koottam Thettiyavar	
1987	Asokan Charuvil	Suryakantikalude Nagaram	
1988	K. K. Krishnakumar	Sastram Jeevitham	
1989	N. Prabhakaran	Pulijanmam	
1990	K. C. Umesh Babu	Kavithakal	
1991	P. V. K. Panayal	Thalamurakalude Bhaaram	
1992	Vaisakhan	Noolppalam Kadakkunnavar	
1993	M. Vijayan	Kuttapoo	
1994	Satheesh K. Satheesh	Karutha Pakshiyude Pattu	
1995	P. P. Ramachandran	Mittayitheruvu	
1996	T. V. Kochubava	Vridhasadanam	
1997	Prabhakaran Pazhassi	Magic Man	
1998	N. Sasidharan; E. P. Rajagopalan	Kelu	
1999	S. Ramesan	Karutha Kurippukal	
2000	Sarah Joseph	Aalahayude Penmakkal	
2001	Santhosh Echikkanam	Ottavaathil	
2002	M. S. Kumar	Aanameesha	
2003	K. C. Sreeja	Ororo Kalathilum	
2004	Ambikasuthan Mangad	Marakkappile Theyyangal	
2005	Manamboor Rajan Babu	Kavithayude Pettakam	
2006	T. P. Venugopalan	Anunasikam	
2007	P. K. Warrier	Smrithiparvam	
2008	Dr. K. Sreekumar	Ozhivukalam	
2009	P. Gangadharan	Overall contribution	
2010	Khadija Mumtaz	Barsa	
2011	N. K. Desam	Mudra	
2012	Susmesh Chandroth	Bar Code	
2013	K. P. A. C. Lalitha	Katha Thudarum	
2014	U. K. Kumaran	Thakshankunnu Swaroopam	
2015	C. Vasudevan	Overall contribution	
2016	Karivellur Murali	Ee Bhoomi Aarudeth	
2017	Prof. K. P. Sankaran	Overall contribution	
2018	O. P. Suresh	Taj Mahal	
2019	M. K. Manoharan	Alakkukallukalude Pranayam	
2020	M. P. Parameswaran	Kaalaharanamillatha Swapnangal	
2021	Sheela Tomy	Valli	
2022	Suresh Babu Sreestha	—	
2023	Vinod Krishna	9mm Beretta	
2024	Indrans	Indradhanussu	
