= Barsa (novel) =

Book by Khadija Mumtaz

- Book cover
- Author: Khadija Mumtaz
- Language: Malayalam
- Genre: Novel
- Publisher: DC Books
- Publication date: 2007
- Publication place: India
- Pages: 190
- Awards: Kerala Sahitya Akademi Award (2010)
- ISBN: 9788126417254

Barsa is a 2007 Malayalam novel written by Khadija Mumtaz. The story deals with Sabida, a devout and educated Muslim lady, who spent six years in a hospital in Saudi Arabia. It won awards including the Kerala Sahitya Akademi Award (2010), Cherukad Award (2010) and K. V. Surendranath Literary Award (2008). A Kannada translation of Barsa was released by the Karavali Lekhakiyara Vachakiyara Sangha in February 2012.
