= K. R. Tony =

Indian poet and translator (born 1964)

- Born: 23 May 1964; Thrissur, Kerala, India
- Occupations: Poet; assistant professor
- Awards: Kerala Sahitya Akademi Award (2013)

K. R. Tony (born May 23, 1964) is an Indian poet and translator from Kerala.

== Works ==
K R Tony has been contributing poems and poetic studies in leading literary journals and periodicals of Kerala since 1980; SAMANILA, his first collection of poems established him as one of the prominent voices in contemporary Malayalam poetry; later his poem collections published in order: ANDHAKANDAM, DAIVAPPATHI, OH! NISHADA, PLAMENAMMAYI and YAKSHIYUM MATTUM. His studies on literature titled : POREZHUTH published in 2010. his poems have been translated into various Indian languages and are included in several anthologies of Malayalam as well as Indian poetry of the post-modern phase. His OH! NISHADA, has won Kerala Sahitya Akademi Award for Poetry in 2013.

- Samanila
- Andhakandam
- Daivappathi.
- Oh! Nishada
- Plamenammayi
- Yakshiyum Mattum
- Hporezhuth
- GiGi

== Awards ==
- 1999 Vyloppilly Award
- 2000 Kerala Sahitya Akademi Kanakasree Award
- 2013 Kerala Sahitya Akademi Award
- 2014 V. T. Kumaran Award
- 2014 Ayanam A. Ayyappan Award
- 2016 First Sree Kerala Varma Award
