= Nooranad Haneef =

- Born: 20 February 1935; Nooranad, Alleppey, Travancore
- Died: 5 August 2006 (aged 71); Quilon, Kerala, India
- Occupations: Author, teacher

Nooranad Haneef was an Indian author in Malayalam-language from Quilon, Kerala. Haneef published around 32 works including novels, short stories, travelogues and children's literature.

== Life ==
Haneef was born on 20 February 1935 to Thampi Rawther and Sulekha at Nooranad in the present-day Alleppey district of Kerala, India. He completed his schooling from Athikkattukulangara Lower Primary School, Nooranad Upper Primary School and Adoor High School and graduated in Malayalam literature from NSS College Pandalam. He taught Malayalam at the West Quilon Government High School, Quilon for over 35 years. He published his first novel Theeram Kanaatha Thiramalakal in 1967. He published around 32 works including 24 novels and two travelogues.

He served as a member of several literary organisations including Kerala Sahitya Akademi, Samastha Kerala Sahithya Parishad, Sahitya Pravarthaka Sahakarana Sangam and Authors Guild of India. He was also advisory committee member of All India Radio, Trivandrum and governing body member of the Quilon Public Library and Research Centre. He died on 5 August 2006 at a private hospital in Quilon. He had been undergoing treatment for cancer for a long time.

== List of works ==
Novel

- Theeram Kanaatha Thiramalakal
- Gotha
- Kizhakkottu Ozhukunna Puzha
- Ivide Janichavar
- Kireedamillathe Chenkolillathe
- Athirathram
- Adimakalude Adima
- Champalinte Puthri
- Agnimegham
- Agnivarsham
- Urvashi
- Kalapani
- Athirukalkkappuram

Travelogue

- Thalasthanam Muthal Thalasthanam Vare
- Nizaminte Naattil

Children's literature

- Chellakkili Chemmanakkili

== See also ==
- Nooranad Haneef Award
