= Ithramathram =

Ithra Mathram
- Directed by: K. Gopinathan
- Written by: K. Gopinathan
- Based on: Ithra Mathram by Kalpatta Narayanan
- Starring: Biju Menon; Swetha Menon; Malavika Nair; K. P. A. C. Lalitha; Nedumudi Venu
- Edited by: B. Ajithkumar
- Release date: 14 September 2012
- Running time: 98 minutes
- Country: India
- Language: Malayalam

Ithramathram is a 2012 Indian Malayalam-language film directed by K. Gopinathan from a screenplay adapted from Kalpatta Narayanan's novel of the same name. The film takes a closer look into the life of a 38-year-old woman living in a sleepy village in Wayanad, on her death, from the memories of a few persons who were part of her life. The film stars Biju Menon, Swetha Menon and Malavika in pivotal roles. The film was released on 14 September 2012 to mixed reviews. It won the FIPRESCI Award for Best Malayalam Film at the 17th International Film Festival of Kerala.

== Cast ==
- Biju Menon as Vasudevan
- Swetha Menon as Sumithra
- K. P. A. C. Lalitha as Marlyamma
- Nedumudi Venu as Gowdar
- Siddique as Poduval
- Anoop Chandran as Dasan
- V. K. Sreeraman as Kaaranavar
- Malavika Nair as Anasooya

== Awards ==
International Film Festival of Kerala - 2012

- FIPRESCI Award for Best Malayalam Film – (K. Gopinath)

2nd South Indian International Movie Awards

- Nominated—Best Actress - Swetha Menon
