= Gracy (writer) =

Indian Malayalam writer

Gracy is a Malayalam author. Her first collection of short stories, Padiyirangippoya Parvati, was published in 1991. Her awards include the Lalithambika Antharjanam Award (1995), the Thoppil Ravi Award (1997), the Katha Prize for the Best Malayalam Short Story (1998) and the Kerala Sahitya Akademi Award (2000). Her major works are Narakavaathil, Randu Swapna Darsikal, Kaveriyude Neru, Eezbu Penkathakal, Panikkannu and a collection, Gracyude Kathakal. Her stories have been translated into English, Hindi, Tamil and Oriya. She was the head of the Malayalam department, Al-Ameen college, Edathala, Aluva.

Her story, ‘Baby Doll’, is barring the melodramatic laments of a mother who wants to lock her daughter away from reality.

== Awards ==
1. 1995: Lalithambika Antharjanam Award (1995)
2. 1997: Thoppil Ravi Award - Bhrantan Pookkal
3. 1998: Katha Prize for the Best Malayalam Short Story - "Paanchaali"
4. 2000: Kerala Sahitya Akademi Award (Collection of short stories) - Randu Swapna Darshikal
5. 2020: Kendra Sahitya Akademi Award for Children's Literature for the book "Vazhthappetta Poocha" (Translation: "Blessed Cat")

== Bibliography ==
1. Padiyirangippoya Parvati (1991)
2. Narakavaathil
3. Randu Swapna Darsikal
4. Bhraanthan Pookkal
5. Kaveriyude Neru
6. Eezhu Penkathakal (Editor)
7. Panikkannu
8. Gracyude Kathakal
9. Moothrathikkara
10. Oru Cheriya Jeevithathinte Sirorekhakal (Autobiography)
11. Udal vazhikal (stories)
12. Apadha Sancharikalkku oru kaipusthakam (memories)
13. Vaazhthappetta Poocha (Baalasahithyam)
