= Khadija Mumtaz =

Indian Malayalam language author

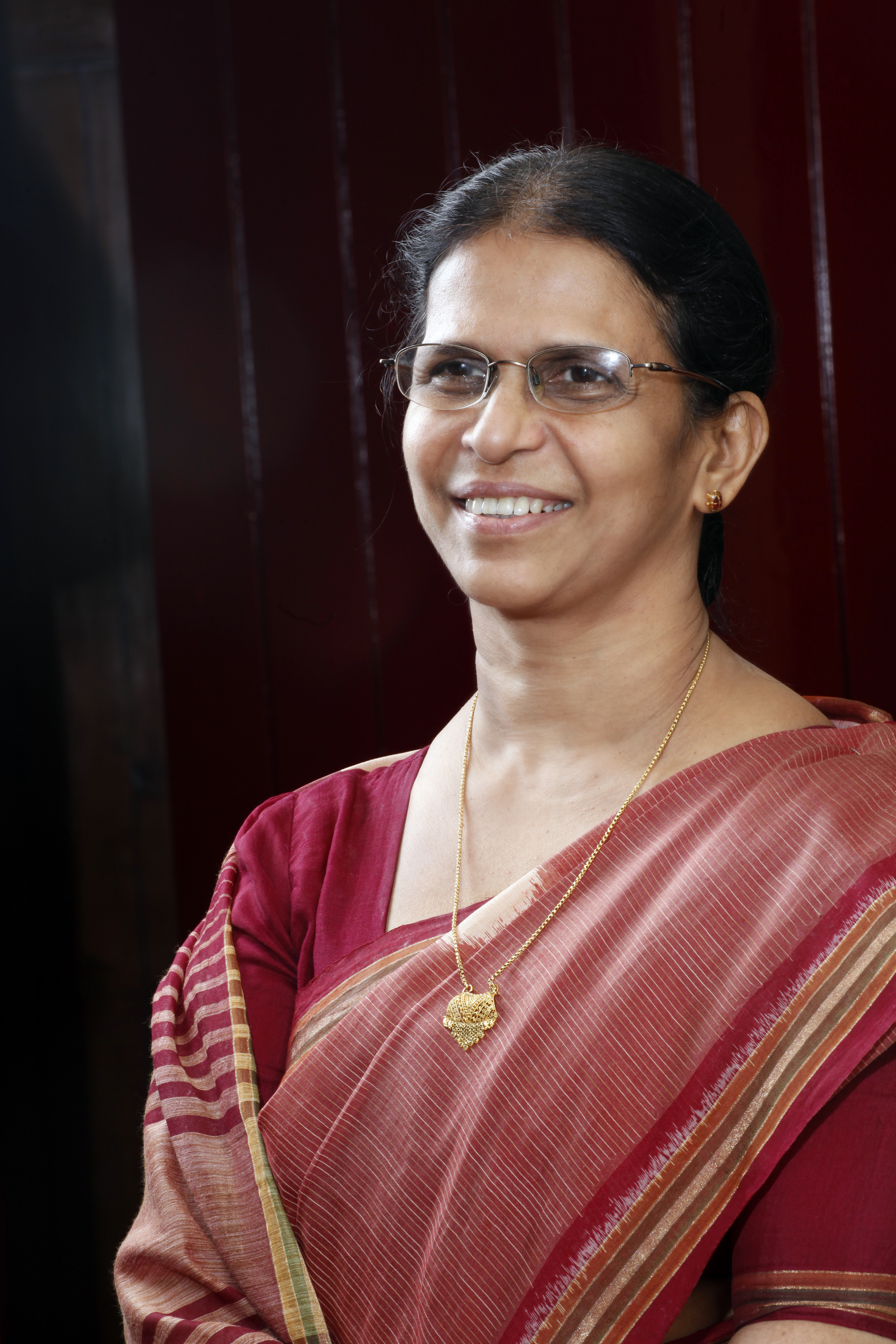
- Born: 1955 (age 70–71); Kattoor, Thrissur district, Kerala state, India
- Education: St. Joseph's College, Irinjalakuda, Kozhikode Medical College
- Occupations: Obstetrician & Gynaecologist, Writer, Professor
- Writing career
- Language: Malayalam
- Notable works: Barsa, Aathuram, Mathrukam
- Notable awards: Kerala Sahitya Akademi Award

Khadija Mumtaz (born 1955) is a Malayalam author from Kerala state, India. She is a medical doctor by profession and is known for her second novel Barsa which won the Kerala Sahitya Akademi Award in 2010.

== Personal life ==
She applied for voluntary retirement from government service in June 2013 to protest against her transfer from Calicut Medical College.

== Literary career ==
Mumtaz started her literary career with Athmatheerthangalil Munginivarnnu, which was first published as a serial novel in Chandrika weekly and later as a book by Current Books in 2004. Mumtaz rose to fame with her novel Barsa (2007), which was a great critical and popular success. The book, which won critical acclaim for its forceful but humorous presentation of the restrictions under which Muslim women are forced to live. It won the Kerala Sahitya Akademi Award for the year 2010. Mumtaz's next novel, Athuram, released on 28 January 2011 at the 12th International Book Festival in Kochi.

== Bibliography ==
- Athmatheerthangalil Munginivarnnu (Novel, Current Books, Thrissur, 2004)
- Barsa (Novel, DC Books, Kottayam, 2007) Translated to English, Tamil & Kannada
- Doctor Daivamalla (Memoirs, DC Books, Kottayam, 2009)
- Athuram (Novel, DC Books, Kottayam, 2010)
- Sargam, Samooham (Essays, Bookpoint, Kozhikode, 2011)
- Balyathil Ninnu Irangi Vanna Oral (Short stories, Piano Publications, Kozhikode, 2011)
- Mathrukam (Scientific literature, DC Books, Kottayam, 2012)
- Purushanariyatha Sthreemukhangal (Essays, Mathrubhumi Books, Kozhikode, 2012)
- Pirakkum munbe karuthalode (Science fiction, Current Books, Thrissur, 2013)
- Neettiyezhuthukal (Novel, DC Books, Kottayam, 2017)
- Naam Jeevitham Chuttedukkunnavar (Short Stories, Granma Books, Kozhikode, 2017)
- Khayalat (Articles, Space Kerala Publications, Kozhikode, 2017)
- Pranayam, Laingigatha, Sthree vimochanam (Articles, Olive Publications, Kozhikode, 2018)

== Awards ==
- 2008: K. V. Surendranath Literary Award for Barsa
- 2010: Kerala Sahitya Akademi Award for Barsa
- 2010: Cherukad Award for Barsa
- 2018: Thrissur Sahithya Vedi Award for Neettiyezhuthukal
