= P. Raman =

Malayalam-language poet from Kerala, India

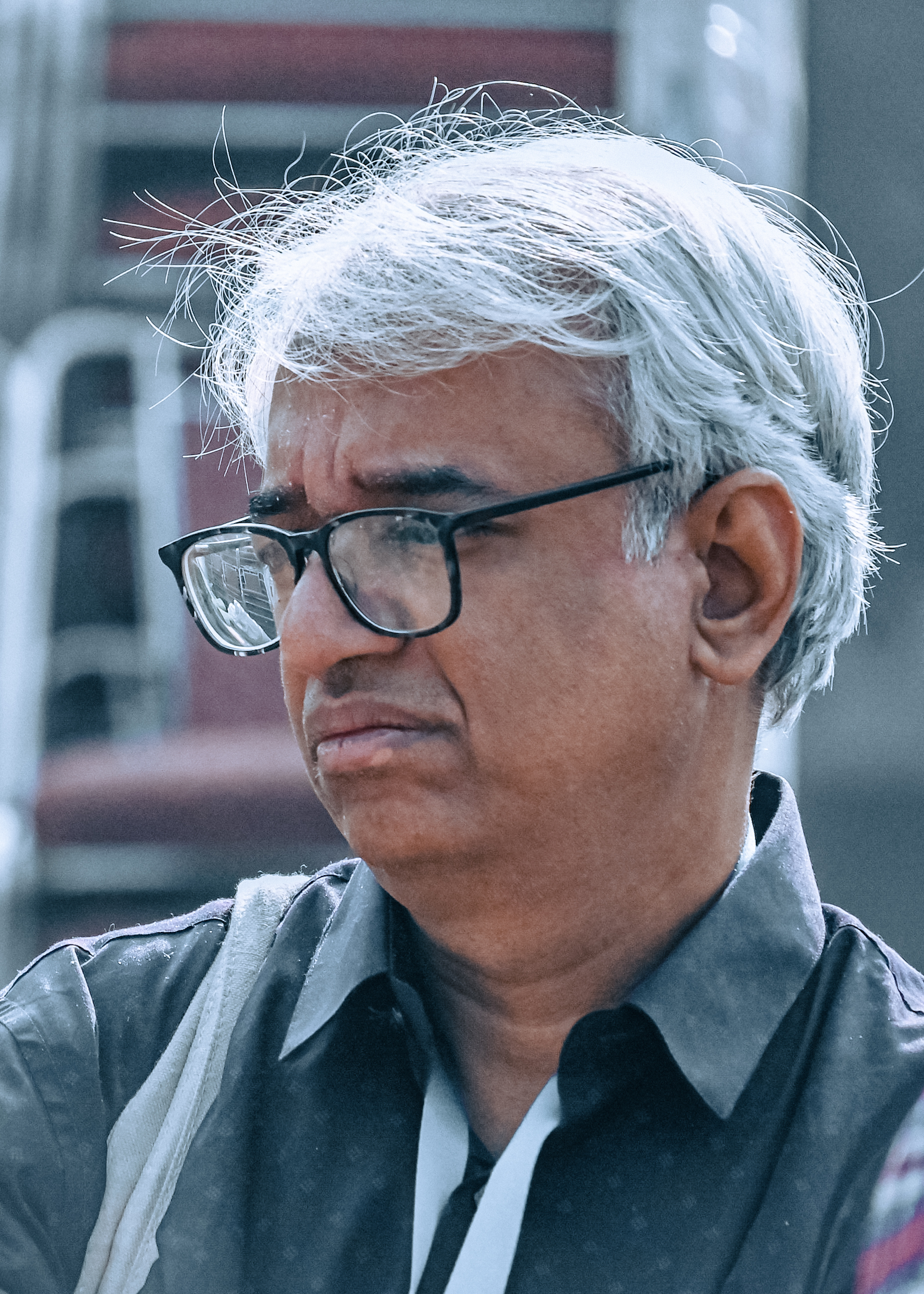
P. Raman in 2025

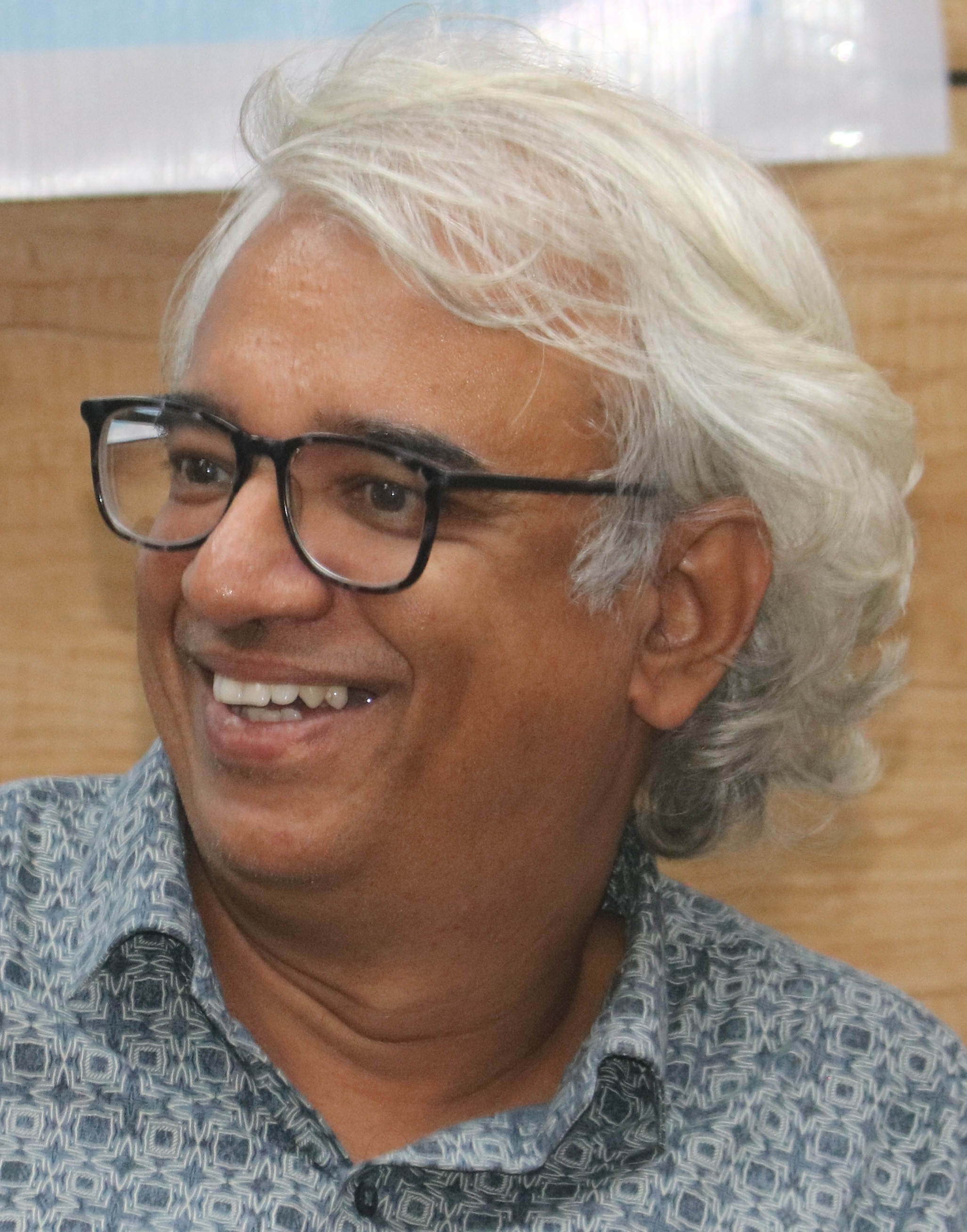
Malayalam poet P. Raman at a book release function at Kollam 2025

P. Raman (born 1972) is a Malayalam-language poet and teacher from Pattambi, Kerala, India. A postmodern poet, P. Raman is a recipient of the Kerala Sahitya Akademi Award.

== Biography ==
P. Raman was born in 1972 in Pattambi, situated in the Palakkad district of Kerala. He pursued his post graduation in Malayalam from Government Sanskrit College, Pattambi. He worked as a Malayalam teacher at the Government Janatha Higher Secondary School, Naduvattam, Pattambi and the Government Oriental Higher Secondary School, Pattambi. He is married to poet and novelist Sandhya N. P., and the couple has two children.

He currently works as a Malayalam teacher at Government Higher Secondary School, Kuttippuram.

== Works ==
Year	Title	Publisher	Notes	Ref.
2000	Kanam (കനം)	Thrissur: Current Books	Poetry	
2006	Thurumpu (തുരുമ്പ്)	Kottayam: DC Books	Poetry	
2013	Bhashayum Kunjum (ഭാഷയും കുഞ്ഞും)	Thrissur: Current Books	Poetry	
2017	Rathri Pantrandarakku Oru Tharattu (രാത്രി പന്ത്രണ്ടരയ്ക്ക് ഒരു താരാട്ട്)	Calicut: Mathrubhumi Books	Poetry	
2020	Pinnilekku Veesunna Kattu (പിന്നിലേക്കു വീശുന്ന കാറ്റ്)	Kottayam: DC Books	Poetry	
2021	Irattavalan (ഇരട്ടവാലൻ)	Kottayam: DC Books	Poetry	
2021	Maayapponnu (മായപ്പൊന്ന്)	Calicut: Mathrubhumi Books	Translation of Tamil stories by Jeyamohan	
2022	Kavinizhalmala (കവിനിഴൽമാല)	Kottayam: DC Books	Literary criticism	
2022	Kulathile Nakshatram Engane Keduthum? (കുളത്തിലെ നക്ഷത്രം എങ്ങനെ കെടുത്തും?)	Cochin: Samooh	Translation of poems	

== Awards ==
- 2001: Kerala Sahitya Akademi Award – Kanakasree Endowment for Kanam
- 2017: Deshabhimani Literary Award for Poetry for Rathri Pantrandarakku Oru Tharattu
- 2019: Kerala Sahitya Akademi Award for Poetry for Rathri Pantrandarakku Oru Tharattu
- 2019: Ayanam – A. Ayyappan Poetry Award for Rathri Pantrandarakku Oru Tharattu
- 2022: P. Kunhiraman Nair Award for Irattavalan
- 2022: K. V. Thampi Award
