= INU =

Inu or INU may refer to:

- Krisnan Inu (born 1987), New Zealand professional rugby league
- Irbid National University, Jordan
- Incheon National University, South Korea
- International Network of Universities
- Nauru International Airport (IATA code: INU), the sole airport on the island of the Republic of Nauru
- Inertial Navigation Unit
- Inu (fish), a genus of fishes in the family Oxudercidae
