= K. B. Sreedevi =

Indian Malayalam language writer (1940–2024)

- Born: 1 May 1940; Vaniyambalam, Malabar district, Madras Province, British India
- Died: 16 January 2024 (aged 83); Tripunithura, Kerala, India
- Occupation: Writer
- Spouse: Brahmadathan Namboodiripad
- Children: 3
- Parent(s): Narayanan Bhattathippad; Gowri Antharjanam
- Writing career
- Notable awards: Kerala Sahitya Akademi Award for Overall Contributions; Kerala State Film Award for Story

Koodalloor Brahmadathan Sreedevi (1 May 1940 – 16 January 2024) was an Indian writer, who wrote in Malayalam, under the genre of children's literature. She received several awards including the Kerala Sahitya Akademi Award for Overall Contributions and the Kerala State Film Award for Story.

Her granddaughter Ranjana K. made her novel Yajnam into a forty-five-minute film with the same title. Her story Shilpe-rupini was translated into English by Gita Krishnankutty as Woman of Stone (1990). When her work Niramala was made into a film, she did its screenplay, too.

== Biography ==
K. B. Sreedevi was born on 1 May 1940, in Vellakattumana in Vaniyambalam in present-day Malappuram district to V. M. C. Narayanan Bhattathippad and Gowri Antharjanam. Her father, Narayanan Bhattathiripad, was a progressive thinker. Initially, she studied in a building within the premises of her house. Realizing the hardships of children in the village walking kilometers to study, Narayanan Bhattathiripad, along with his friends, established a school in Wandoor town. With that, Sreedevi also joined there as a sixth-grader. She was later educated at Tripunithura Girls' High School and Varavoor Government School. She studied up to tenth class. Sreedevi also studied music and Sanskrit. Later she did higher studies in Sanskrit under Panditharaja P. S. Subbarama Pattar. For three years she practiced Veena under Naravath Devakiamma.

Sreedevi wrote her first story, about the death of a bird, at the age of thirteen. She published many novels and short stories through publications like Ezhuthachan Masika, Jayakeralam and Mathrubhumi.

She married Brahmadathan Namboodiripad at the age of sixteen. While living with her husband, in 1960 she founded a Mahila Samajam (group of women). Formed for the upliftment of women and children, the group had more than 100 members. The group organized education classes to make women literate, cultural activities for women, and job training for women. She was active with the group until she shifted to Thrissur.

=== Personal life ===
Sreedevi and her husband Brahmadathan Namboodiripad of Koodalloor Mana had 3 children. Sreedevi, who lived in Thrissur for many years, later lived in Tripunithura in Ernakulam district.

K. B. Sreedevi died on 16 January 2024, at the age of 83.

== Notable works ==
- Moonnam Thalamura (in Malayalam). Chintha Publications. March 2013. ISBN 978-9382808091.
- Yajnjam (in Malayalam). H and C Books.
- Chanakkallu (in Malayalam) (2 ed.). H and C Books. March 2017. ISBN 978-9386208415.
- Mukhathodu Mukham (in Malayalam). Poorna Publications. 1 January 2007. ISBN 978-8130007199.
- Thiriyuzhichil (in Malayalam). NationalBookStall. November 2012.
- Kuttithirumeni. Sahitya Pravarthaka Co-operative Society. 1980.

=== Short story collections ===
- Kathakal. Kochi: Kurukshethra Prakasan. 2014. ISBN 978-93-81731-96-3. OCLC 907583041.
- Krishnanuragam
- Common Wealth
- Chiranjivi
- Pattamula
- Pinneyum Padunna Kili

=== Screenplays ===
- Niramala

=== Works on Indian mythology and folklore ===
- Bi Śr̲Īdēvi, Ke (2016). Bhāgavataparyaṭanaṃ : purāṇaṃ (in Malayalam). Ayyanthole, Thrissur, Kerala. ISBN 978-93-80884-11-0. OCLC 1126353641., stories based on Bhagavata Purana
- Njanappana. GREEN Books. 2019. ISBN 978-93-80884-09-7. OCLC 1130764814., Elaborated writing of Njanappana by Poonthanam
- Parayi Petta Panthirukulam (in Malayalam). H and C Books. 1 January 2018. ISBN 978-9387911529.
- Agnihothram (in Malayalam). H and C Books. 1 January 2017. ISBN 978-9386531827.
- Vaduthala Nair (in Malayalam). H and C Books. October 2015.
- Uppukottan (in Malayalam) (2 ed.). H and C Books. 1 January 2015. ISBN 978-9385916052.
- Naranathu Bhranthan (in Malayalam) (1 ed.). H and C Books. 1 January 2014. ISBN 978-9384736149.
- Perunthachan (in Malayalam). H and C Books. 1 January 2015. ISBN 978-9385175756.
- Karakkalamma (in Malayalam). H and C Books. 1 January 2015. ISBN 978-9385175305.
- Vallon (in Malayalam). H and C Books. 1 January 2015. ISBN 978-9384321789.
- Pananar (in Malayalam). H and C Books.
- Akavur Chathan (in Malayalam). H and C Books. ISBN 978-9385916304.
- Rajakan (in Malayalam). H and C Books. 1 January 2015. ISBN 978-9385554469.
- Pakkanar (in Malayalam). H and C Books. 1 January 2015. ISBN 978-9384736798.
- Mezhathur Agnihothri (in Malayalam). H and C Books.
- Sreekrishna Katha (in Malayalam). H and C Books. 25 September 2021.
- Dasharatham
- Devahooti
- Vrathasuran
- Karinkali, Research novel on 'Karinkali', the farming goddess of the early adivasis of Ernad

=== Plays ===
- Kururamma

=== Studies ===
- Pracheena Gurukulangal Kerala Samskarathinu Nalkiya Sambhavana, study on contributions of ancient scholars to Kerala with scholarship from Department of Human Resources, Government of India
- Study on woman writers of Kerala with grant in aid from Kerala Sahitya Akademi

== Awards and honours ==
- Kerala Sahitya Akademi Award for Overall Contributions
- Kerala State Film Award 1975 for Story, Niramala
- Kumkumam Award 1974, for the novel Yajnam
- Nalapadan Award(2000) (Nalapat Narayana Menon- given by Nalapadan Memorial Cultural Society, Punnayurkulam) for Moonnam Thalamura
- VT Award.
- Rotary Award 1982for Story, Niramala
- Deviprasadam Trust Award, 2009
- Njanappana Award 2021, considering her comprehensive contributions to the field of literature over six decades
- Raikva Rishi Award 2014
- Amritakeerti Puraskar 2018
