= K. P. Sankaran =

Indian literary critic

- Born: May 15, 1939 (age 87); Kerala, India
- Occupation: literary critic
- Writing career
- Language: Malayalam

K. P. Sankaran (born 15 May 1939) is a Malayalam–language literary critic from Kerala, India. Born in Painkulam in Trichur district of the erstwhile Kingdom of Cochin (now part of India), he was a teacher at Changanacherry S.B. College, Trichur Kerala Varma College and Mysore Regional Institute of Education from where he retired in 2001. He resides with his wife Kamala Devi in Kottapparambu near Chelavoor, Calicut since 2019. He has authored around 30 books.

== Works ==
- Sameepanam (1970). Calicut: Poorna Publications
- Rithuparivarthanam (1972). Calicut: Poorna Publications
- Navakam (1988). Calicut: Poorna Publications
- Anuseelanam (2002). Trichur: Current Books
- Abhivadhyam (2005). Trichur: Kerala Sahitya Akademi
- Thriveni (2005). Trichur: Current Books
- Sapthakam (2009). Trichur: Kerala Sahitya Akademi
- C. S. Nair: Nammude Sahitya Vimarshanathinte Sukranakshatram (2013). Sukapuram: Vallathol Vidyapeetham
- Mattoru Vailoppilly (2015). Sukapuram: Vallathol Vidyapeetham
- Akkithaperuma (2022). Sukapuram: Vallathol Vidyapeetham
- Kavitha Hridayam
- Gandhi Kavithakal: Pathanam
- Adhyatma Ramayanam: Samshodhanam, Vyakhyanam
- Hari Nama Keerthanam: Vyakhyanam
- Mahabharatam: Oru Punarvayana
- Jnanappana: Vyakhyanam

== Awards ==
- 2004: Kerala Sahitya Akademi Award for Literary Criticism (Anuseelanam)
- 2008: Deviprasadam Trust Award
- 2012: Kerala Sahitya Akademi Award for Overall Contributions
- 2017: Cherukad Award
- 2019: S. Guptan Nair Award
- 2019: Vyloppilli Jayanthi Award
- 2021: Kerala Sahitya Akademi Fellowship
- 2023: Akkitham Award
- K. P. Narayana Pisharody Award
- Dr. C. P. Menon Memorial Award
