= Ashitha (writer) =

Indian writer (1956–2019)

- Born: 5 April 1956; Pazhayannur, Trichur, Travancore-Cochin, India
- Died: 27 March 2019 (aged 62); Thrissur, Kerala, India
- Occupation: Writer
- Spouse: Raman Kutty
- Children: A daughter
- Parent(s): Balachandran Nair; Thankamani Amma
- Writing career
- Genres: Short story, poetry, novel, translation
- Notable works: Vismaya Chhihnangal; Apoorna Viramangal; Mazhameghangal; Thathagatha; Meera Padunnu
- Notable awards: 2015 Kerala Sahitya Akademi Award for Story; 2000 Padmarajan Award; 1994 Lalithambika Anterjanam Smaraka Sahitya Award; 1986 Edasseri Award; Ankanam Award; Thoppil Ravi Award

Ashitha (5 April 1956 – 27 March 2019) was an Indian writer of Malayalam literature, best known for her short stories, poems and translations. She helped popularize haiku poems in Malayalam through her translations. She was a recipient of the Kerala Sahitya Akademi Award for Story and other honours including the Padmarajan Award, Lalithambika Anterjanam Smaraka Sahitya Award and Edasseri Award.

== Biography ==
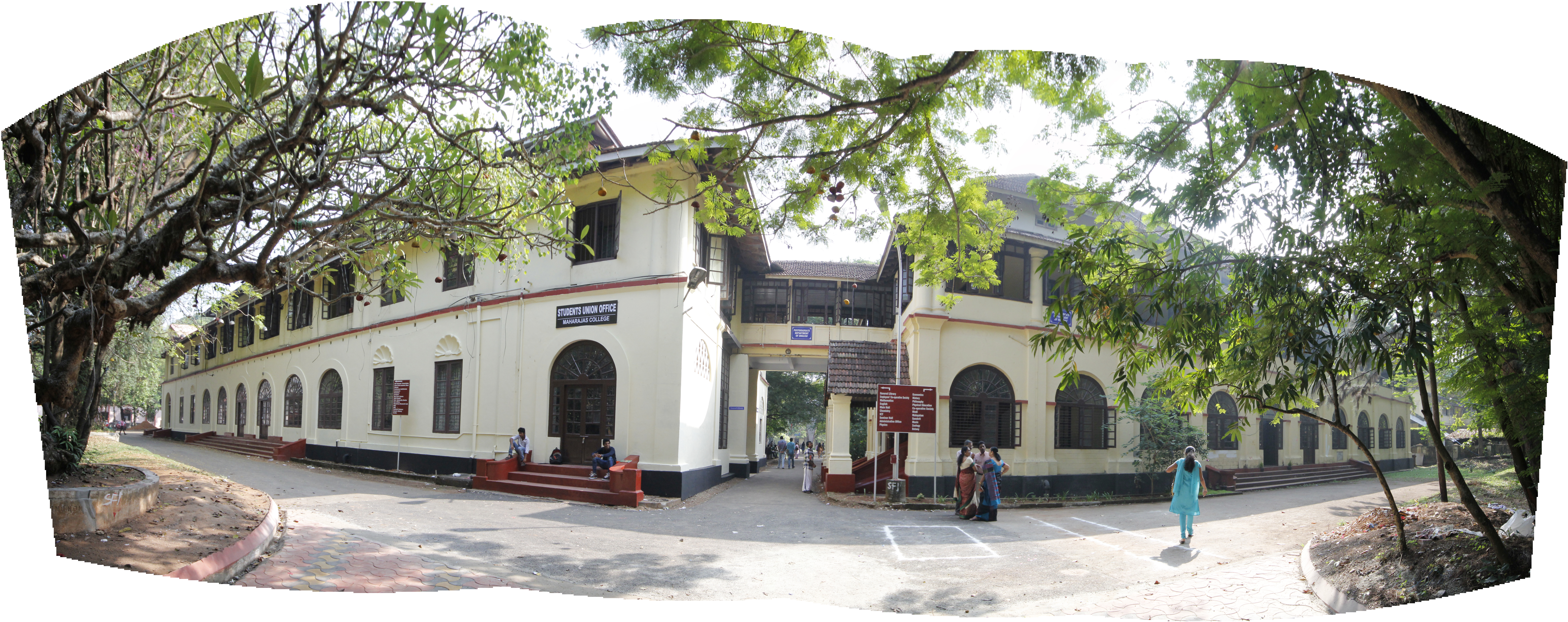
Maharaja's College, Ashitha's alma mater

Ashitha was born on 5 April 1956 in Pazhayannur in Trichur district of Kerala to Kazhangottu Balachandran Nair and Thekkekarupath Thankamani Amma. She completed her schooling from Delhi and Bombay and obtained her graduate and master's degrees in English literature from Maharaja's College, Ernakulam.

Ashitha was married to K. V. Ramankutty and had a daughter, Uma Praseedha. She was diagnosed with cancer in 2013 and was undergoing treatment when she died on 27 March 2019, at 62, survived by her husband, daughter and son-in-law.

== Legacy ==
Ashitha, who authored over 20 books, was known to have portrayed her life experiences through short stories and poems. Counted among the most prominent women writers in Malayalam after Kamala Surayya and best known for her short stories, she translated a number of works of Alexander Pushkin and Jalāl ad-Dīn Muhammad Rūmī as well as many haikus. She also adapted the Ramayana, Bhagavatam, Jataka tales and Aithihyamala for children. Her biography, Athu Njanayirunnu (That Was I), was published by Shihabuddin Poythumkadavu. The annual Ashitha Memorial Literary Award was instituted in 2022 in her memory.

== Awards ==
Ponnani Edasseri Smaraka Samithi selected Ashitha's work, Vismaya Chhihnangal for an Edasseri Award in 1986 and she received the Lalithambika Anterjanam Smaraka Sahitya Award in 1994. Her short story anthology, Thathagatha, fetched her the Padmarajan Award in 2000. Kerala Sahitya Akademi selected Ashithayude Kathakal, another short story anthology, for its annual award for story in 2015. She was also a recipient of Ankanam Award and Thoppil Ravi Foundation Award.

== Selected works ==
=== Short stories ===
- Ashitha (2002). Nilavinte Nattile. DC Books. ASIN B007E4VMWU.
- Ashitha (2012). Mazhameghangal. DC Books. ASIN B007E4VNO2.
- Ashitha (2007). Amma Ennotu Parnha Nunakal. Green Books. ISBN 979-8184230535.
- Ashitha (2015). Ashithayude Kathakal. Mathrubhumi. ISBN 978-8182664937.
- Ashitha (2013). Ori Sthreeyum Parayathathu. Kerala Bhasha Institute. ISBN 9788188420100.
- Ashitha (2015). Ma Faleshu (in Malayalam). Kelkkam Audio Books. ISBN 9780000104847. "(audio book)"
- Ashitha (1987). Vismaya chihnangal. Edatt: Malayalam.
- Ashitha (1993). Apoorna viramanghal. Kozhikode: Mulberry.
- Ashitha (1999). Thathagatha.

=== Novels and novellas ===
- Ashitha (2013). Mayilpeelisparsham. Melinda Books. ISBN 978-8188420841.
- Ashitha (2017). Ashithayude Novallettukal. Saikatham Books. ISBN 978-9386222152.
- Ashitha (2018). Ashithayude Novallettukal. Saikatham Books. ISBN 978-9386222787.

=== Poetry ===
- Ashitha. Meera Paadunnu (in Malayalam). Mathrubhumi. ISBN 978-81-8266-550-7.
- Ashitha. Ashithayude Haiku Kavithakal (in Malayalam). Mathrubhumi.
- Ashitha. Shivena Sahanarthanam (in Malayalam). Mathrubhumi.
- Ashitha (2014). Ashithayude Haiku Kavithakal (in Malayalam). Green Pepper. ISBN 978-8193034453.

=== Children's literature ===
- Ashitha (2015). Jaathaka Kadhakal. Malayala Manorama Co. Ltd. ISBN 978-93-83197-72-9.
- Ashitha (2008). 365 Kunjukathakal. DC Books. ISBN 978-81-264-0918-1.
- Ashitha. Ramayanam Kuttikalkku (in Malayalam). Mathrubhumi. ISBN 978-81-8265-516-4.
- Ashitha. Bhagavatham Kuttikalkku (in Malayalam). Mathrubhumi.
- Ashitha (2007). Kuttikalude Aithihyamala. DC Books. Archived from the original on 27 March 2019.
- Ashitha (2015). Kochurajakumaran. Melinda Books. ISBN 978-9383885381.
- Ashitha (2018). Kunjhu Njandum Amma Njandum. Mambazham. ISBN 9789352821907. Archived from the original on 27 March 2019.
- Ashitha (2018). Chemmariyadinte Soothram. Mambazham. ISBN 9789352821921. Archived from the original on 27 March 2019.
- Ashitha (2018). Kottiyum Kurukkanum. Mambazham. ISBN 9789352821884. Archived from the original on 27 March 2019.
- Ashitha (2018). Kothiyan Kakka. Mambazham. ISBN 9789352821860. Archived from the original on 27 March 2019.

=== Translations ===
- Ashitha. Rumi Paranja Kathakal (in Malayalam). Mathrubhumi.
- Ashitha (2017). Parayam Namukku Kathakal. Read Me Books. ISBN 978-8193422526.
- Potter, Beatrix (2016). Peter Enna Muyalum Mattu Kathakalum. Translated by Ashitha (First ed.). Kozhikode, Keralaṃ, India: Mathrubhumi Books. ISBN 9788182669529. OCLC 971034780.
- Spyri, Johanna (2017). Heidi. Translated by Ashitha. Mathrubhumi Books. ISBN 9788182671591.
- Padhavinyaasangal: 32 Russian kavithakal. Translated by Ashitha. Thrissur: Cosmo books. 1999.
- Laotsu (2003). Tao: Guruvinte vazhi. Translated by Ashitha. Ayiloor: Sorba Publications. ISBN 9789382279419.

=== Memoirs ===
- Ashitha; Poythumkadavu, Shihabuddin (2019). Athu Njanayirunnu. Mathrubhumi. ASIN B07P7N27PK.

=== Others ===
- Ashitha (2015). Vishnu Sahasranamam. Saikatham Books. ISBN 978-9382909286.
- Ashitha (2015). Sneham Thanne Snehathilezhuthiyathu (Ashithayude Kathukal). Green Pepper. ISBN 978-9385253065.

=== In compilations ===
- Rajeevkumar, M. (1984). Antharjanam Muthal Ashitha Vare. Paridhi Publications, Thiruvananthapuram: Paridhi Publications, Thiruvananthapuram.

== See also ==
- Ashitha Memorial Literary Award
- List of Malayalam-language authors by category
- List of Malayalam-language authors
