= K. V. Ramanadhan =

Indian writer (1932–2023)

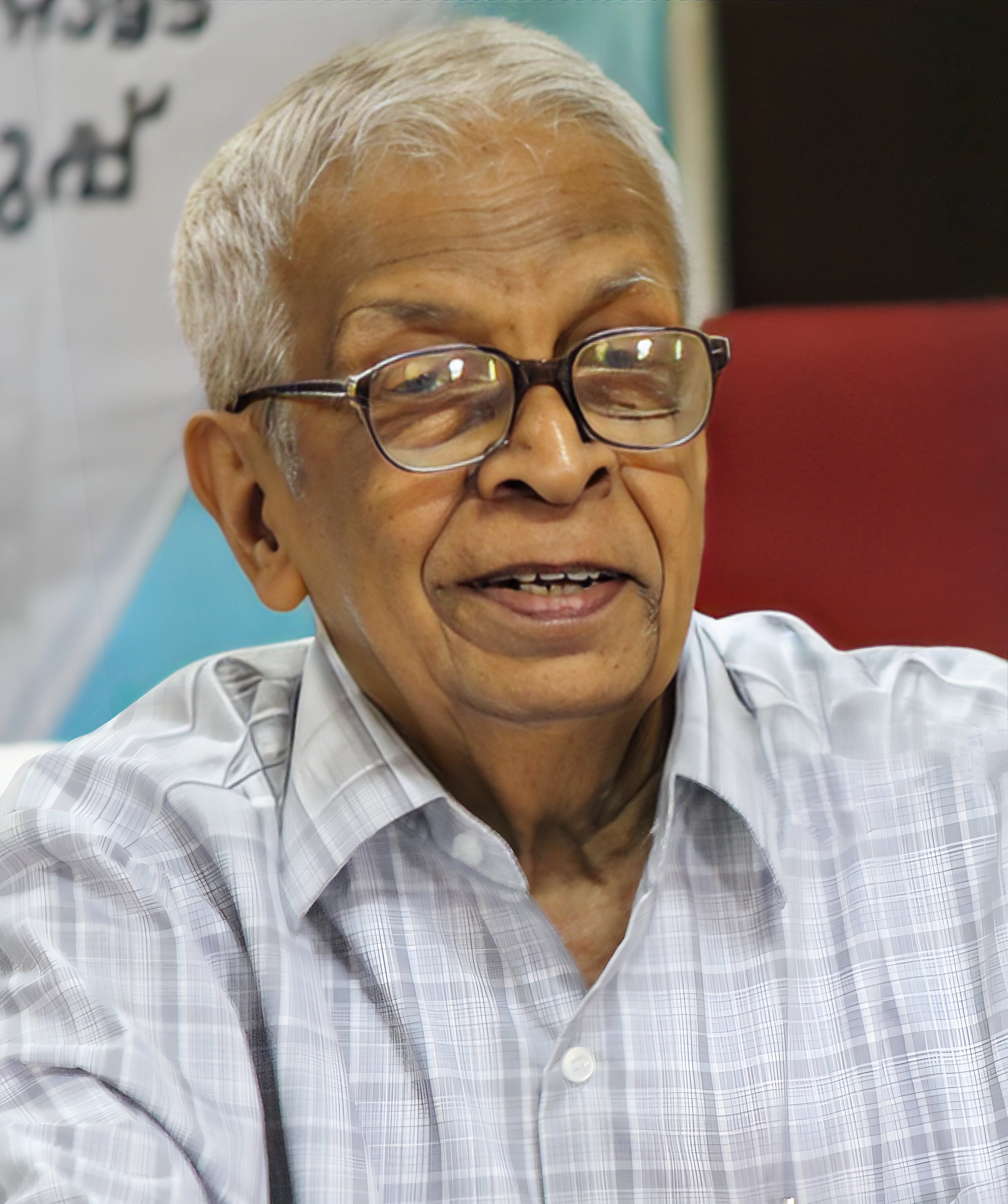
- Born: 29 August 1932; Irinjalakuda, Kingdom of Cochin
- Died: 10 April 2023 (aged 90); Trichur, Kerala, India
- Occupations: Writer, teacher
- Spouse: K. K. Radha
- Children: 2
- Writing career
- Language: Malayalam, English
- Genre: Children's literature
- Notable works: Appukuttanum Gopiyum, Commander Gopi, Aamayum Muyalum Orikkal Koodi, Atbhutha Vanaranmar, Atbhutha Nirali
- Notable awards: Kerala Sahitya Akademi Award for Children's Literature (1994); C. G. Santhakumar Award (2011); Kendra Sahitya Akademi Award for Children's Literature (2014)

K. V. Ramanadhan (29 August 1932 – 10 April 2023) was an Indian children's writer in Malayalam. He received the Kerala Sahitya Akademi Award for Children's Literature in 1994 for his work Atbhutha Nirali, the C. G. Santhakumar Award by the Kerala State Institute of Children's Literature in 2011 and the Kendra Sahitya Akademi Award for Children's Literature in 2014 for his overall contribution to the field of children's literature.

== Life ==
Ramanadhan was born in 1932 on Palace Road near the famous Koodalmanikyam Temple in Irinjalakuda in present-day Trichur district of Kerala state, India. His mother was Kizhakkevalappil Kochukutti Amma and his father was Manammal Shankara Menon. He was educated at Irinjalakuda Sangameswaravilasam LP School, Ernakulam Govt Boys High School, Ernakulam Maharajas College, and Trichur Govt Training College. From 1951 to 1987, he served as a teacher and headmaster at Irinjalakuda National High School. Some of his students during this period include oncologist V. P. Gangadharan, Indian Space Research Organisation former chairman K. Radhakrishnan, actor Innocent and playback singer P. Jayachandran.

Ramanadhan died on 10 April 2023 at a private hospital in Trichur. He was survived by his wife K. K. Radha, retired principal, of Government Vocational Higher Secondary School, Irinjalakuda; and two daughters.

== Literary career ==
Ramanadhan published his first story in 1949 in Deenabandhu newspaper's weekend edition. He regularly contributed to several periodicals in the ensuing decades, kindling the imagination of an entire generation of children and instilling in them the power of dreams. He also wrote for English magazines such as Shankar's Children's World, The Hindu's Young World, Young Expression, Young Communicator and Children's Digest. His children's literature books Appukuttanum Gopiyum and Aamayum Muyalum Orikkal Koodi won awards from SPCS. Atbhutha Vanaranmar won the Kairali Children's Booktrust Award and Atbhutha Nirali won the Bhima Smaraka Award and the Kerala Sahitya Akademi Award for Children's Literature. His other works include Commander Gopi, Swarnathinte Chiri, Munthirikkula, Kannuneer Muthukal, Visha Vriksham, Mantrika Poocha, Kuttikalude Sakunthalam, Ajnatha Lokam, Swarna Muthu (children's literature), Pravahangal, Chuvanna Sandhya (novel) and Ragavum Thalavum (short story). Ramanadhan is also a recipient of the Samastha Kerala Sahithya Parishad Award for Short Story.

In 2024, the Irinjalakuda unit of Yuvakalasahithy instituted a literary award in memory of K. V. Ramanadhan. The first award was won by E. P. Sreekumar.

== Works ==
Children's literature

- Appukkuttanum Gopiyum
- Mantrika Poocha
- Kuttikalude Sakunthalam
- Atbhutha Vanaranmar
- Atbhutha Nirali
- Adrisya Manushyan
- Tagore Kathakal
- Kuttikalkku Snehapurvam
- Commander Gopi
- Aamayum Muyalum Orikkal Koodi
- Visha Vriksham
- Swarnathinte Chiri
- Kannuneer Muthukal
- Kunjurumpum Kulakkozhiyum

Novel

- Pravahangal
- Chuvanna Sandhya

Short story

- Ragavum Thalavum
- Karmakandam

Others

- Malayala Bala Sahityam: Udbhavavum Valarchayum (Study)
- Ormayile Manimuzhakkam (Memoir)

== Awards ==
- 1961: SPCS Award – Appukuttanum Gopiyum
- 1968: SPCS Award – Aamayum Muyalum Orikkal Koodi
- 1987: Kairali Children's Booktrust Award – Atbhutha Vanaranmar
- 1992: Bhima Smaraka Award – Atbhutha Nirali
- 1994: Kerala Sahitya Akademi Award for Children's Literature – Atbhutha Nirali
- 2011: Kerala State Institute of Children's Literature's C. G. Santhakumar Award – Overall contribution
- 2014: Kendra Sahitya Akademi Award for Children's Literature – Overall contribution
