= Aymanam =

Aymanam Ayemenem
- Village
- Location in Kerala, India Aymanam (India)
- Coordinates: 9.6246600°N 76.4851070°E
- Country: India
- State: Kerala
- District: Kottayam

Area
  - Total: 30 km^{2} (12 sq mi)

Population (2011)
  - Total: 34,470
  - Density: 1,100/km^{2} (3,000/sq mi)

Languages
  - Official: Malayalam, English
- Time zone: UTC+5:30 (IST)
- PIN: 686017
- Vehicle registration: KL-05
- Climate: Tropical (Köppen)

Aymanam is a village in the Kottayam District of Kerala, India. It is about 4 km from the railway station in Kottayam along the road to Parippu, and 85 km from the Cochin International Airport. Aymanam is the setting for Arundhati Roy's 1997 novel The God of Small Things.

== Demographics ==
As of 2011 India census, Aimanam had a population of 34,470 with 16,761 males and 17,709 females.

== Etymology ==
In Malayalam, Ay means "five" and Vanam means "forest". Hence, Aymanam means "five forests", which, according to tradition, were Vattakkadu, Thuruthikkadu, Vallyakadu, Moolakkadu and Mekkadu. They survive today only as "snake groves", where fertility idols, in the form of snakes, were worshiped under the trees. Families depute Brahmin once a year for ritualistic offering.

== Geography ==
Lake Vembanad lies to the west of the village, near Kumarakom, with the Meenachil River providing its water supply, which often floods from June to August due to regular monsoons. Consequently, two-thirds of the village are paddy fields.

The borders of the village are mostly delineated by rivers or canals, and include the villages of Arpookara, Kumara Nallooru, Thiruvarpu and Kumarakom, and the municipality of Kottayam.

== In popular culture ==
Aymanam (also spelled in her novel "Ayemenem") is the setting for the 1997 novel, The God of Small Things by Arundhati Roy, the village where she grew up. In the village, two houses—Puliyampallil House and Shanti House was used "to construct her 'Ayemenem House'". The former house was described in the novel as "with its steep gabled roof pulled over its ears like a low hat". The house belongs to one of Roy's aunts. The latter house has European interior designed by the ex-wife of Roy's uncle, both of them are modelled as "Chacko" and "Margaret" in the novel.

== Notable residents ==
- Arundhati Roy - writer
- Aymanam John - writer
- N.N. Pillai - Drama and cinema artist.
- Vijayaraghavan (actor) - Malayalam movie actor.
- Mary Poonen Lukose - Surgeon General of India and state legislator of Travancore.
- Guinness Pakru - Malayalam Movie Actor
- Mary Roy - Indian educator and women's rights activist
