= Vijayalakshmi (poet) =

Indian poet (born 1960)

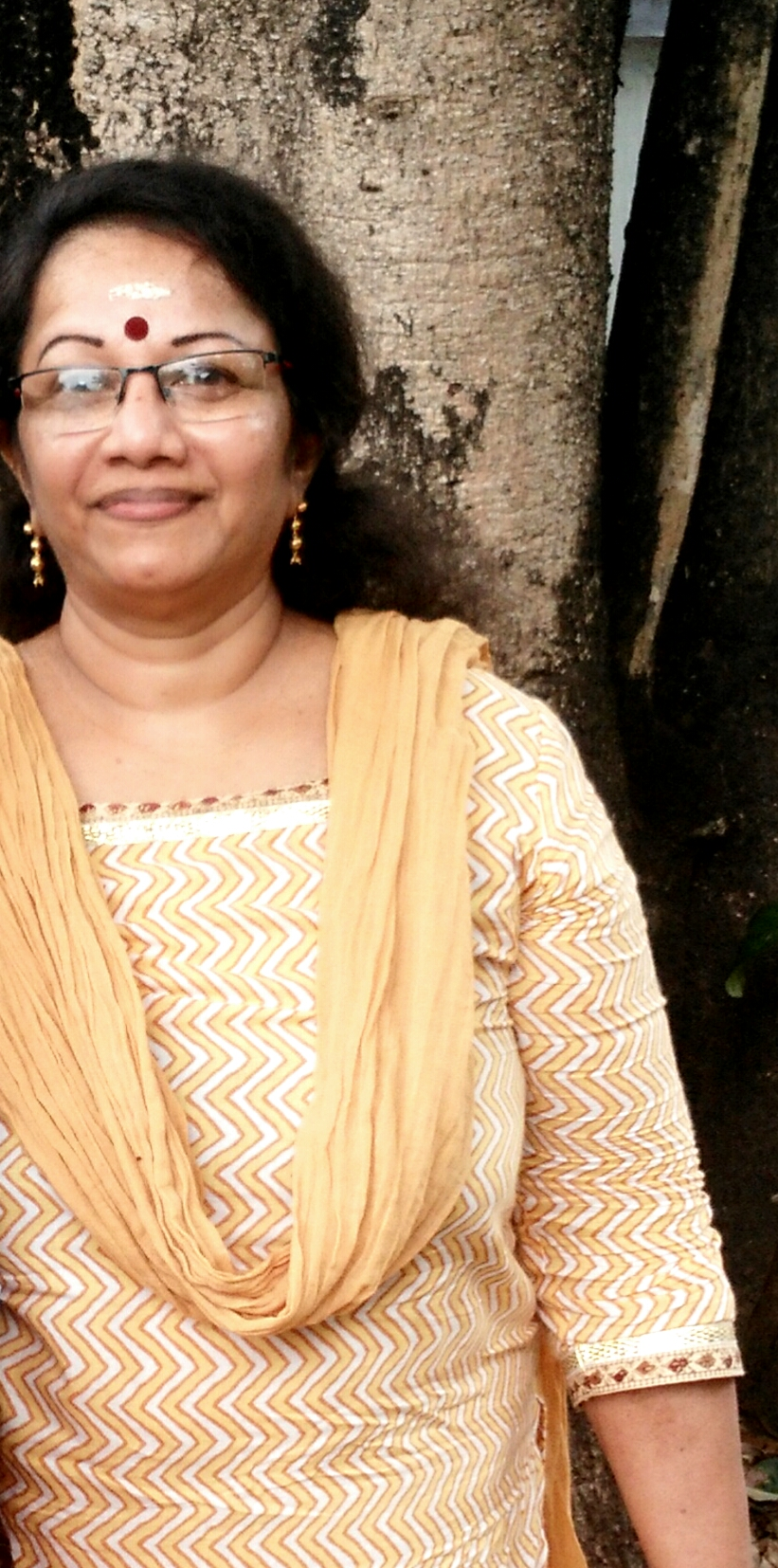
- Born: 2 August 1960 (age 66); Mulanthuruthy, Ernakulam district, Kerala, India
- Education: St. Teresa's College; Maharajas College
- Occupation: Poet
- Spouse: Balachandran Chullikkadu
- Children: 1
- Writing career
- Language: Malayalam
- Notable works: Mrigasikshakan; Oozham
- Notable awards: 1992 Lalithambika Antarjanam Smaraka Sahitya Award; 1994 Kerala Sahitya Akademi Award for Poetry; 2001 P. Kunhiraman Nair Award; 2011 Ayyappan Puraskaram; 2013 Padmaprabha Literary Award; 2013 O. V. Vijayan Sahitya Puraskaram

Vijayalakshmi (born 2 August 1960) is a Malayalam–language poet from the South Indian state of Kerala.

== Life ==
Vijayalakshmi was born on 2 August 1960 in Mulanthuruthy village in Ernakulam district as the daughter of Kuzhikkattil Raman Velayudhan and Kamalakshi. She completed her education from Chottanikkara Government High School, St. Teresa's College, Ernakulam and Maharajas College. She completed her graduation in Biology and obtained her masters in Malayalam literature with a first rank from Kerala University. She is married to Balachandran Chullikkadu, a known Malayalam poet.

== Literary career ==
Her poem was first published in 1977 in Kalakaumudi weekly. During her graduation period, she won prizes in the Kerala University Youth Festival in story-writing and poetry.

She has published numerous poems in Malayalam. She was a member of the Executive Committee and General Council of Kerala Sahitya Akademi. She has also held various other posts in the Academy, such as its Advisory Board Member and the Convener of its Publication Committee. She also served as Vice President of the Samastha Kerala Sahitya Parishad.

Many of Vijayalakshmi's poems try to establish gender-equality and question the dichotomy on women. Literary critic M. Leelavathy lauds the concept of feminism in Vijayalakshmi as a continuation of the feminism of the Malayalam poet Balamani Amma.

== Works ==
- Mrigasikshakan (1992, Mulberry Publications, Calicut)
- Thachante Makal (1992, DC Books, Kottayam)
- Mazhathan Mattetho Mukham (1999, DC Books, Kottayam)
- Himasamadhi (2001, DC Books, Kottayam)
- Anthyapralobhanam (2002, DC Books, Kottayam)
- Ottamanalthari (2003, DC Books, Kottayam)
- Anna Akhmatovayude Kavithakal (2001, DC Books, Kottayam, Trans.)
- Andhakanyaka (2006, DC Books, Kottayam)
- Mazhaykkappuram (2010) (2010, DC Books, Kottayam)
- Vijayalakshmiyude Kavithakal (2010, DC Books, Kottayam)
- Jnana Magdalena (2013, DC Books, Kottayam)
- Seethadarsanam (2016, DC Books, Kottayam)
- Vijayalakshmiyude Pranayakavithakal (2018, DC Books, Kottayam)

== Awards ==
- 1992: Lalithambika Sahitya Award
- 1990: Ankanam Sahitya Award
- 1994: Kerala Sahitya Akademi Award
- 1995: Vyloppilly Award
- 1995: Changampuzha Award
- 1995: Indira Gandhi Sahitya Award
- 1997: V. T. Bhattathirippad Award
- 2001: P. Kunhiraman Nair Award for Mazhathan Mattetho Mukham
- 2010: Bala Sahitya Institute Award
- 2010: Ulloor Award
- 2011: A. Ayyappan Poetry Award
- 2011: Krishnageethi Award
- 2013: Library Council Literary Award
- 2013: O. V. Vijayan Sahitya Puraskaram for Vijayalakshmiyude Kavithakal
