= E. Santhosh Kumar =

Indian writer

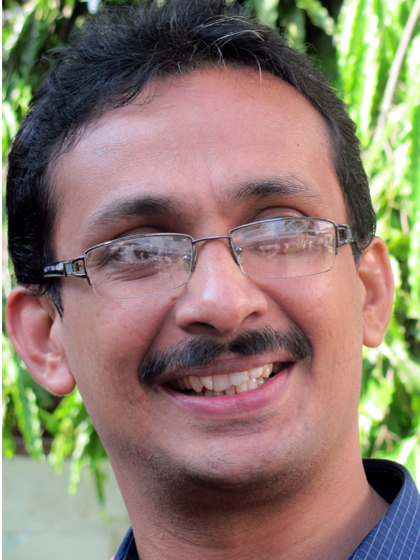
- Born: 1969 (age 56–57); Pattikkad, Thrissur, Kerala, India
- Occupation: Writer
- Writing career
- Language: Malayalam
- Genres: Novel, short story
- Notable works: Chavukali; Andhakaranazhi; Thapomayiyude Achan
- Notable awards: Kerala Sahitya Akademi Award

E. Santhosh Kumar (born 1969) is an Indian Malayalam-language writer known for his short stories, novels, essays, and works of children's literature. He has won numerous awards, including Kerala Sahitya Akademi Award twice in 2006 and in 2012.

== Biography ==
He was born in Pattikad, Thrissur, Kerala. He studied at Government High School, Pattikad; Sree Kerala Varma College; and St. Thomas College, Thrissur He worked for more than three decades at the National Insurance Company and took voluntary retirement in 2020. He currently lives in Kolazhy Gram Panchayat, Thrissur.

== Works ==
Galapagos, which was later published as a collection, was his first published short story. He won his first Kerala Sahitya Akademi Award in 2006 for Chavukali, a collection of short stories. In 2012, he won the Kerala Sahitya Akademi Award for the second time, for his novel Andhakaranazhi. Thapomayiyude Achan is being translated into English, Hindi, Tamil, Kannada.

== Awards ==
- Kerala Sahitya Akademi Award for Story (2006)
- Nooranad Haneef Memorial Novel Award (2012)
- Kerala Sahitya Akademi Award for Novel (2012)
- Vayalar award 2025 for “Thapomayiyude achan”
