= K. G. Sankara Pillai =

Indian poet (born 1948)

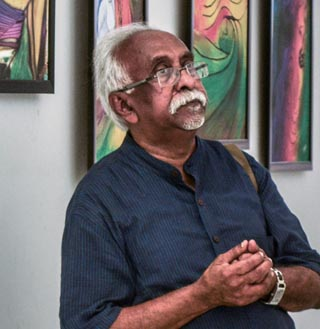
- Born: 1948 (age 77–78)
- Occupations: Poet, human rights activist
- Writing career
- Language: Malayalam
- Notable work: K. G. Sankara Pillayude Kavithakal 1969-1996, KGS Kavithakal 1997-2007
- Notable awards: Kendra Sahitya Akademi Award, Kerala Sahitya Akademi Award

K. G. Sankara Pillai (born 1948) is an Indian poet. He came into prominence in the 1970s with the publication of the poem "Bengal" and is now one of the most popular among the modernist poets of Kerala. A recipient of the state and central Sahitya Akademi Awards in 1998 and 2002 respectively, his writings in Malayalam have been translated into many Indian languages, as well as Chinese, French, German, English and Sinhala.

He has been a teacher of literature, starting as a lecturer in 1971 and retiring in 2002 from the post of Principal of Maharaja's College, Ernakulam. He is also an accomplished translator, publishing in Malayalam translations of poetry from different parts of the world. He has also been the editor of several important literary journals, such as Prasakthi and Samakaleena Kavitha. He has published a collection of writings on different aspects of theatre, titled Samvidhayaka Sankalpam.

Closely associated with the human rights and civil rights movements in Kerala, Pillai was the Chairperson of Jananeethi, a human rights organisation.

== Major works ==
- Kochiyile Vrikshangal (Mulberry, Kozhikode, 1994)
- K. G. Sankara Pillayude Kavithakal 1969-1996 (DC Books, Kottayam, 1997)
- KGS Kavithakal 1997-2007 (DC Books, Kottayam, 2008)
- Samvidhayaka Sankalpam (Kerala Sahitya Akademi, Thrissur, 2010)

== Awards ==
- 1998: Kerala Sahitya Akademi Award for K. G. Sankara Pillayude Kavithakal 1969-1996
- 2002: Kendra Sahitya Akademi Award for K. G. Sankara Pillayude Kavithakal 1969-1996
- 2008: P. Kunhiraman Nair Award
- 2009: Odakkuzhal Award
- 2009: Habeeb Valappad Award
- 2011: Pandalam Kerala Varma Poetry Award for KGS Kavithakal 1997-2007
- 2018: Kerala Sahitya Akademi Fellowship
- 2020: Kadammanitta Ramakrishnan Award
- 2025- Ezhuthachan Puraskaram
