= Manamboor Rajan Babu =

Indian Malayalam language writer

- മണമ്പൂർ രാജൻ ബാബു
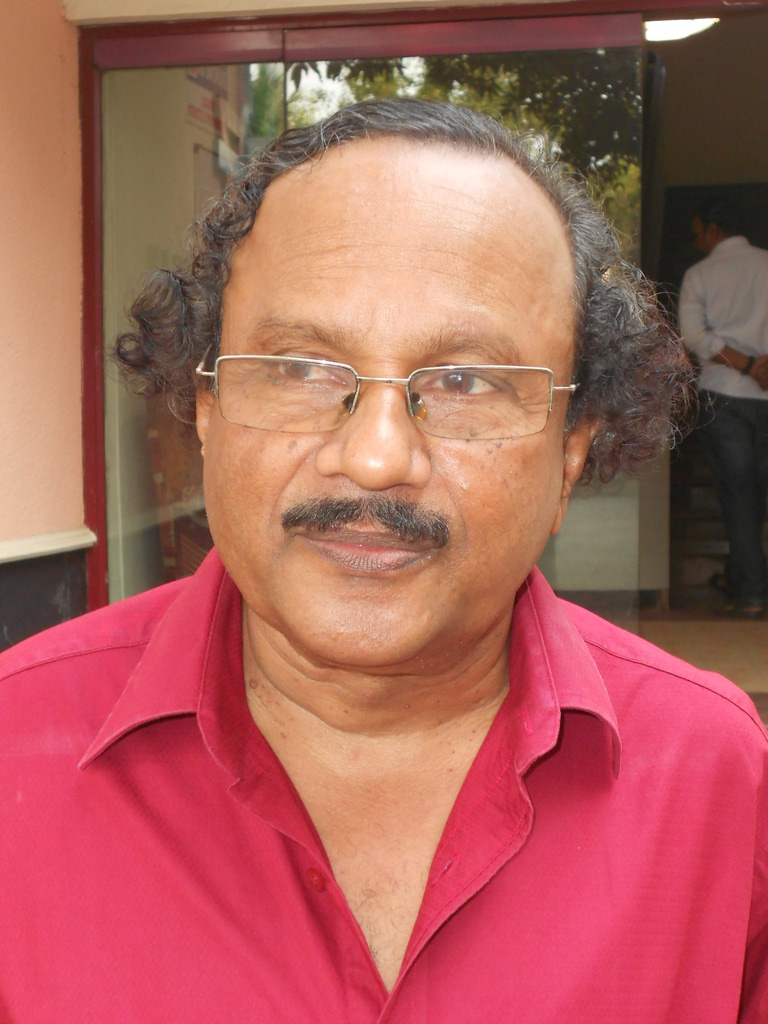
- Born: Rajan Babu; 10 October 1948 (age 78); Manamboor, Travancore, India
- Citizenship: India
- Occupation: writer
- Spouse: Suma
- Parent(s): M. Sivasankaran, G. Bhargavi
- Writing career
- Genre: poems
- Notable awards: Kerala Sahitya Akademi Award for Overall Contributions

Manamboor Rajan Babu (born 1948 October 10) is a Malayalam language poet from Kerala, India. He is the founder and editor of Innu the oldest inland-letter literary magazine publishing from Kerala state. He is the author of fourteen books, including eleven poetry collections. His poems have been translated into English, Hindi, Tamil and other languages.

In 2018, for outstanding contributions in the field of Malayalam literature, he has been awarded Kerala Sahitya Akademi Award for Overall Contributions.

== Biography ==
Rajan Babu was born on 10 October 1948, in Manampur village in Thiruvananthapuram district to M. Sivasankaran and G. Bhargavi. Started career as a teacher in Thiruvananthapuram, he came to Malappuram district in 1976 as a clerk in the Kerala Police department. He had to stay out of service for a year and a half for writing a story called Discipline in a story magazine. The department issued a memo finding that it was an article criticizing superior officers. He was suspended from service, by rejecting his reply stating that it was an imaginary story and not an article critical of anyone. Prominent writers have come out in favor of the narrator, calling for the protection of democratic values such as civil liberties and freedom of expression. He was reinstated after a year and a half. He retired from the service as an Administrative Assistant in the Malappuram District Police Superintendent's Office.

He was a member of Cultural Publications Advisory Board of Government of Kerala and editorial board member of Samskarika Keralam.

=== Personal life ===
He is settled in Malappuram with his wife Suma.

== Selected works ==
- Service Kavithakal (poetry collection)
- Iruttara Kavithakal(poetry collection)
- Kanisham Muthassi
- Police Campile Ezhuthu Jeevitham (Memoirs)
- Panante Paattu
- Swathandryathinte Chihnam
- Verumoru Moshtavaya Njan
- Nerinte Niram
- Kavithayude Pettakam
- Aval
- Janakodikalude E. M. S.

== Awards and honours ==
- Kerala Sahitya Akademi Award for Overall Contributions, 2018.
- Cherukad Award 2005
- Mahakavi Kuttamathu Award
- Abu Dhabi Shakti Award
- He also received the Government Award for Printing and Design twice
