= Thomas Jacob (journalist) =

Indian former journalist

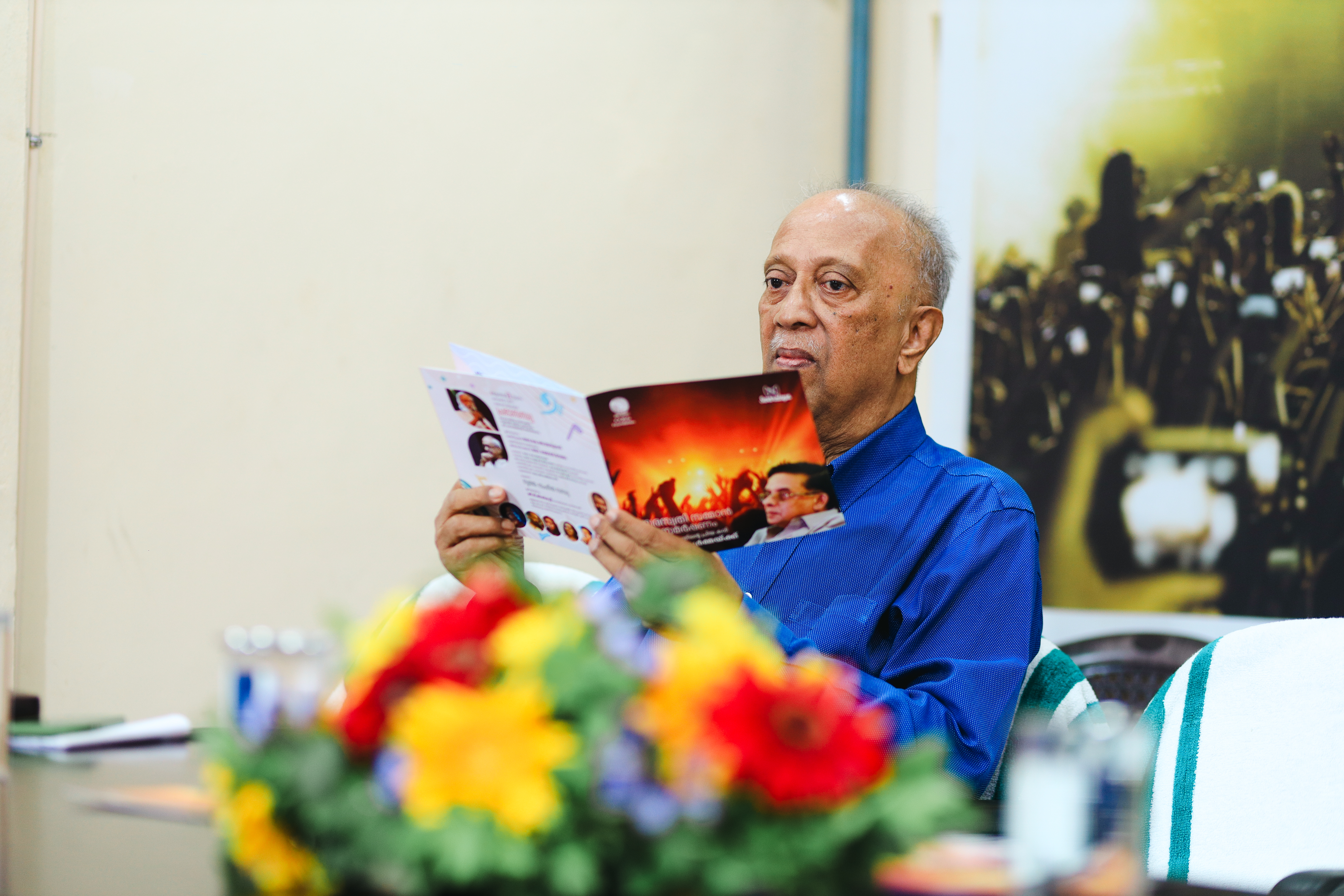
Indian Former Journalist

Thomas Jacob is an Indian former journalist who was the editorial director of Malayala Manorama.

Thomas Jacob is a multifaceted media person. He joined Malayala Manorama in 1960. The story behind his career is interesting. He was interviewed for the post of a cartoonist at Malayala Manorama newspaper but it turned out that his destiny was to become the editorial head of the largest selling vernacular daily in India. At the age of 26, he became one of the youngest news editors in the history of reputed Indian publications. After 56 years of service with Malayala Manorama, he retired as the Editorial Director in 2017.

In 1969, Thomas Jacob became the first Indian journalist to be honored as the topper in the training program for senior journalists by Thomson Foundation, in Britain.

He served as chairman of the Kerala Press Academy between 2001 and 2008. Jacob wrote the column Kathakkoott in Manorama Weekly for many years.

He was bestowed with the prestigious Swadeshabhimani-Kesari award instituted by the state government of Kerala for significant contributions to Malayalam journalism. He is also a recipient of K. Balakrishnan, C. H. Mohammed Koya, K. Vijayaraghavn, N. V. Paily, K. V. Daniel, Thoppil Bhasi, Dr. K. B. Menon memorial awards and Vartha award from Germany.

Thomas Jacob, known for his witty presentation and writing skills, is one of the best journalism teachers in India. "Kadhakkoottu", Thomas Jacob’s column in Malayala Manorama weekly is widely accepted as one of the best-read columns in Malayalam and also noted for its historical and literary richness. He is also the author of books Kadhakkoottu, Kadhavasheshar, and Chandrakkaladharan. He co-authored the book Nattuvisesham with T.Venugopal.

Thomas Jacob is the man who brought class professionalism to Malayalam journalism. It is under his editorial leadership, Malayala Manorama, the largest selling vernacular daily in India, climbed their steps towards becoming the No.1 daily in Kerala, India. Even when he was working with Malayala Manorama, literally most of the media groups, including that of competitors, used to invite him for training their staff.
