= Innu Magazine =

Magazine published in Kerala, India

Innu is an inland-letter magazine published from Malappuram district in Kerala, India, that promotes the old fashioned way of printing and despatching by post. It is the oldest inland-letter literary magazine publishing from Kerala state. The magazine has been inducted into the Limca Book of Records as the longest-running Inland Magazine in India.

== History ==
The experience of creating and distributing a manuscript magazine called Sangamam throughout the Manampur village led Manamboor Rajan Babu to launch an inland-letter magazine. Later, in 1981, at the time of registration, the magazine was renamed as Innu, literally meaning "today". The magazine has released its 400th issue in 2016.

== Content ==
Innu publishes short articles, small poems and short stories and send them to the readers in the form of an inland letter card by using the snail mail system of India. Unlike mainstream publications, Innu supports and encourages new writers and new ideas.

== Support ==
The 400th issue of Innu contained contributions from major Indian writers like Balachandran Chullikkad, T.Padmanabhan, O.N.V.Kurup, M.T. Vasudevan Nair, T. Padmanabhan, C. Radhakrishnan, Akbar Kakkattil, V. Madhusoodanan Nair, and Rafeeq Ahamed.
