= Kalpatta Narayanan =

Indian writer

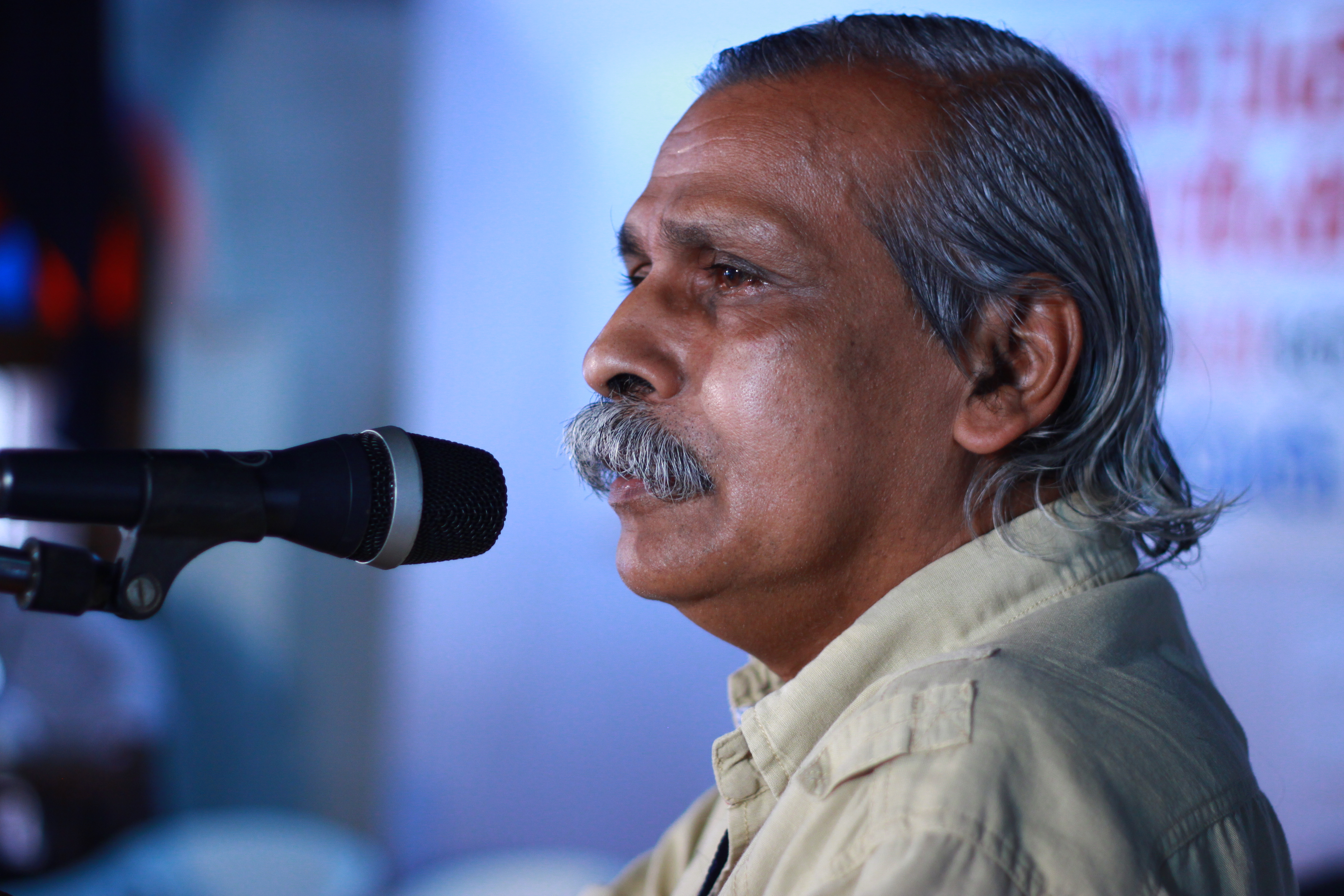
- Born: January 1952 (age 74); Kalpetta, Wayanad, Kerala, India
- Occupations: Poet, novelist, short story writer, essayist, columnist
- Spouse: Radha
- Awards: 2017 Kerala Sahitya Akademi Award for Literary Criticism; Basheer Literary Award; Ayyappan Puraskaram
- Website: Official web site

Kalpatta Narayanan (born January 1952) is an Indian novelist, short story writer, essayist, columnist, and a poet of Malayalam literature. He is known for his novel, Ithramathram and a number of poetry anthologies and other literary contributions. He is a recipient of several awards including Basheer Literary Award, Ayyappan Puraskaram and the Kerala Sahitya Akademi Award for Literary Criticism.

== Biography ==
Narayanan was born in January 1952 to Palukkappil Sankaran Nair and Narayani Amma at Kottathara, a village near Kalpetta in Wynad district of the South Indian state of Kerala. After school education at S.K.M.J. Higher Secondary School, Kalpetta, he completed his college education at Government College, Meenchantha, Kozhikode before starting his career as a lecturer at Government Brennen College. Later, he also served his alma mater, the Government Arts and Science College, Kozhikode before serving as a visiting professor at the University of Calicut.

Narayanan is married to Radha and the couple has two sons, Praphulchandra and Sarathchandran.

== Legacy ==
Narayanan has published a novel, Ithramathram and several poetry anthologies. He has also published a number of studies, criticisms and general essays and has handled columns in dailies and periodicals; Ee Kannadayonnu Vacho Nokkoo in Madhyamam and Budhapaksham in Malayala Manorama are two such columns. He has also delivered speeches at various literary and cultural events. His novel, Ithramathram, has been adapted into a Ithramathram, under the same name and his study on Vaikom Muhammad Basheer under the title, Ethilayum Madhurikkunna Kadukalil is a prescribed text for academic studies at Pondicherry University.

== Awards and recognitions ==
In 2013, Narayanan received the Ayyappan Puraskaram for his anthology, Oru Mudanthante Suvishesham. Two years later, his book, Kavithayude Jeevacharithram was selected for the Basheer Literary Award. He has also received Doha Pravasi Malayali Award, Dr. T. Bhaskaran Award, V. T. Kumaran Award (2012), Shanthakumaran Thampi Award, C. P. Sivadasan Award ad Dr. P. K. Rajan Award. His book, Kavithayude Jeevacharithram was selected for the 2017 Kerala Sahitya Akademi Award for Literary Criticism. In 2018, he received Padmaprabha Literary Award for his outstanding contribution to the Malayalam literature.

== Bibliography ==
=== Poetry ===
- Narayanan, Kalpatta (2013). "Oru Mudanthante Suvisesham". www.indulekha.com. Archived from the original on 16 November 2018.
- Narayanan, Kalpat̲t̲a (1999). Ozhinja Vruskshachayayil (1st ed.). Kozhikode: Maḷber̲i Pr̲asādhanaṃ. ISBN 8124006717. OCLC 42737181.
- Narayanan, Kalpatta (2013). "Oru Mudanthante Suvishesham".
- Nārāyaṇan, Kalpatta (2014). Samayaprabhu : kavitakaḷ. OCLC 908103565.
- Narayanan, Kalpatta (2017). "Karutha Paal". www.keralabookstore.com.

=== Novels ===
- Narayanan, Kalpatta (2010). "Ithramathram". KeralaBookStore.com.

=== Studies and general essays ===
- Kalppat̲t̲a Nārāyaṇan (2014). Saundaryaṃ veḷuppumāyi oruṭampaṭiyiluṃ oppuvecciṭṭilla. Insight Publica. ISBN 978-93-82709-56-5.www.insightpublica.com
- Narayanan, Kalpatta (2015). "Kavithayude Jeevacharitram". www.indulekha.com. Archived from the original on 16 November 2018.
- Narayanan, Kalpatta (2000). "Avar kannukondu ke'lkunnu". library.uoc.ac.in. Archived from the original on 16 November 2018.
- Narayanan, Kalpatta (2013). "Thalsamayam". KeralaBookStore.com.
- Kalppat̲t̲a Nārāyaṇan (2015). Kavitayuṭe jīvacaritr̲aṃ. Mātr̥bhūmi Buks. ISBN 978-81-8266-450-0.
- Narayanan, Kalpatta (2017). "Kayar Murukukayanu". KeralaBookStore.com.
- Narayanan, Kalpatta (2018). "Ente Basheer". KeralaBookStore.com.

=== Memoirs ===
- Narayanan, Kalpatta (2016). "Konthala". www.indulekha.com. Archived from the original on 16 November 2018.
- Narayanan, Kalpatta (2017). "Nizhalattam - Oru Cinema Preskshakante Athmakatha". www.puzha.com. Archived from the original on 16 November 2018.

== See also ==
- Ithramathram
