= Manoj Narayanan =

Indian theatre artist, and director

- Born: Villiappally, Kerala, India
- Occupations: Theatre artist, director

Manoj Narayanan is an Indian theatre artist, and director, from Villiappally. He was the first director to win the Kerala Sangeetha Nataka Akademi award seven times in a row. His famous award-winning works are Ntuppuppakkoranendarnnu based on the same title of the proclaimed novel of the famous writer Vaikkom Mohammed Basheer, Kadathanadan Pennu Thumbolarch, Kadathanattamma, Kuriyedath Thathri, Thacholi Othenan, Perunthachan, Nishkalankan, Nellu, and Vartgamanathilekkoru Kannaki.

Narayanan is also very passionate about children's theatre and has directed many children's plays.
