= Vaikom Chandrasekharan Nair =

Indian writer and journalist

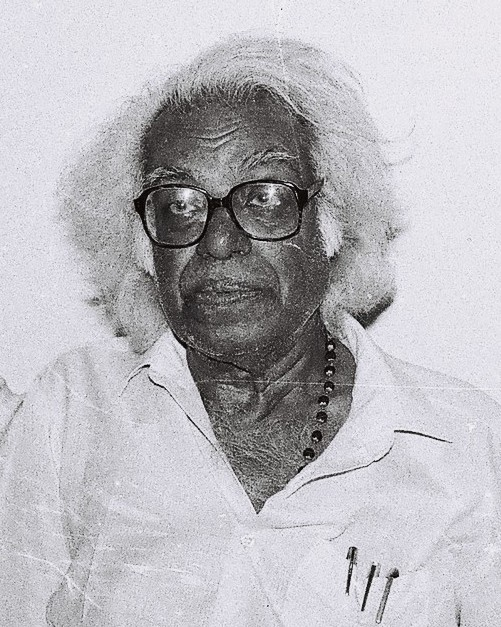
Vaikom Chandrasekharan Nair

Vaikom Chandrasekharan Nair (1928 – 13 April 2005), popularly known as Vaikom, was an Indian writer and journalist who wrote primarily in Malayalam. He was born in Vaikom, a village in Kottayam district of Kerala.

== Career ==
He started writing early in his life and became an activist of the communist party during his college days. Though by career he was a journalist, Vaikkom was a multi-faceted person – a poet, playwright, novelist, actor, orator, singer, artist, and activist. He has been the editor of various magazines such as Janayugam, Kerala Bhooshanam, Kaumudi, Pouraprabha, Kunkumam, Chithrakarthika, Kumari, and Keralam.

Some of his famous novels like Nakhangal, Panchavankadu and Madhavikkutty have been turned into movies. The play Jathugriham was given the Kerala Sahithya Academy award in 1980. He was chairman of Kerala Sangeetha Nadaka Academy from 1978 to '81. In 1999 he was given the Kerala Sahithya Academy Award for lifetime contribution. Vaikom has written more than 60 books

== Major works ==
- Kuttavum Shikshayum
- Alohari
- Thanneerpanthal
- Mississ Mayavathy
- Nakhangal
- Panchavankadu
- Madhavikkutty
- Smrithikavyam
- Ashramam
- Mamanka rathri
- Jathugriham (Play)
- Anubhavangale Nandi (Autobiography)
- Gothradaham (Novel)
- Kayeente Vamsham
- Swathi Thirunal
