= Santhosh Aechikkanam =

Indian Malayalam writer (born 1971)

Santhosh Aechikkanam സന്തോഷ് ഏച്ചിക്കാനം
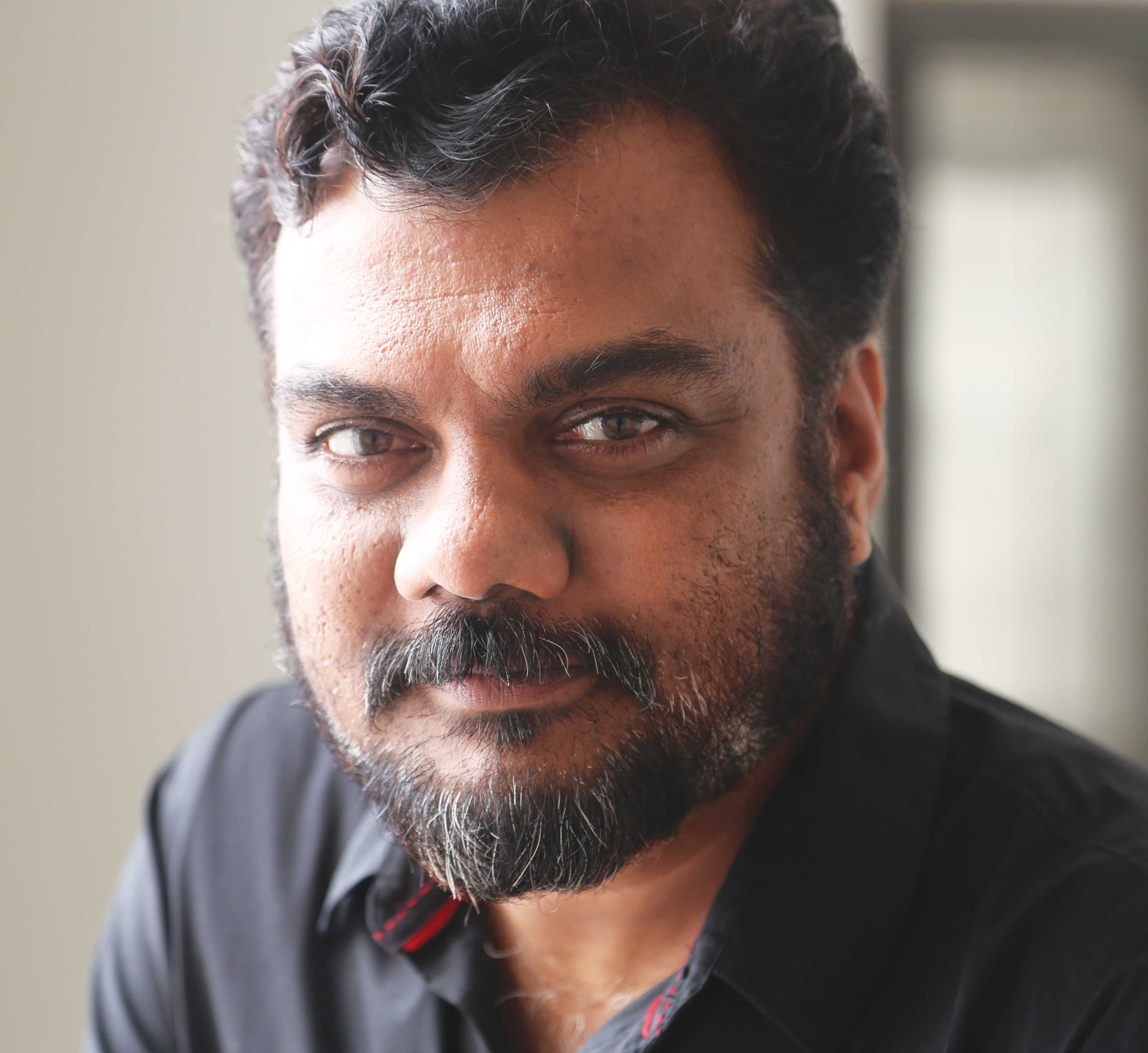
- Santhosh Aechikkanam in 2022
- Born: 1971 (age 54–55); Bedadka, Kasaragod, Kerala, India
- Occupations: Writer, screenwriter
- Spouse: Jalsa Menon
- Children: Mahadevan
- Parents: A. C. Chandran Nair (father); Shyamala (mother)
- Writing career
- Period: 1998–present
- Genre: Fiction
- Notable works: Shwasam; Komala; Naranayum Paravayayum; Biriyani
- Notable awards: Kerala Sahitya Akademi Award for Story; Cherukad Award

Santhosh Aechikkanam is an Indian writer of Malayalam literature and a screenwriter in Malayalam cinema. He is known for his short stories, which include Komala and Biriyani. He also wrote screenplays for films such as Annayum Rasoolum and Bachelor Party.

== Biography ==
Santhosh Aechikkanam was born in 1971 in a farmer's family in Bedadka, in Kasargod district of the Indian state of Kerala to A. C. Chandran Nair and Shyamala. After graduating in Malayalam and literature, he secured a post graduate diploma in Journalism and mass communication from Kerala Press Academy. He has worked as a teacher at Durga Higher Secondary School, Kanhangad and was also associated with Akashvani.

Aechikkanam was involved in a controversy due to his allegedly casteist remarks at a literary festival. His famous short story Biryani sparked controversy amid allegations that it was part of a deliberate effort to create an anti-Muslim collective consciousness through its narrative.

Aechikkanam received the Kerala Sahitya Akademi Award for Story for his short story Komala (2008). He has also received several other honours, including Padmaprabha Literary Award, Karur Award, Pravasi Basheer Award, Abudhabi Sakthi Award, Cherukad Award, V. P. Sivakumar Keli Award, Kolkata Bhasha Sahithya Parishad Award, Delhi Katha Award and Kerala State Television Award for best story.

Aechikkanam is married to Jalsa Menon, who is a college professor and the couple has a son, Mahadevan. The family lives in Ayyanthole in Thrissur district.

== Bibliography ==
=== Short story anthologies ===
- Aechikkanam, Santhosh (2016). Biriyani. DC Books. p. 104. ISBN 978-8126473823.
- Aechikkanam, Santhosh (2019). Parakkallo Athens (in Malayalam). DC Books. p. 128. ISBN 978-9352826544.
- Aechikkanam, Santhosh (2008). Komala. DC Books. p. 84. ISBN 978-8126418954.
- Aechikkanam, Santhosh. Oru Chithrakathayile Nayattukarum Kathapathrangalum Pankeduthavarum. DC Books. p. 184. ISBN 978-9352826841.
- Aechikkanam, Santhosh. Kathakal - Santhosh Echikkanam. DC Books. p. 288. ISBN 978-8126434688.
- Aechikkanam, Santhosh (2013). Shwasam. DC Books. p. 96. ISBN 978-8126449125.
- Aechikkanam, Santhosh (4 September 2004). Oru Chithrakadhayile Nayattukar. DC Books. ASIN B007E4VT32.
- Aechikkanam, Santhosh (2010). Naranayum Paravayayum. DC Books. ISBN 978-8126428380.
- Aechikkanam, Santhosh. Ente Priyappetta Kathakal. DC Books. p. 208. ISBN 978-9352821150.
- Aechikkanam, Santhosh. Ottavaathil. Olive Books. p. 116.

=== Poems ===
- Nanni

=== Memoirs ===
- Aechikkanam, Santhosh (2013). Malabar Whistling Thrush. DC Books. p. 110. ISBN 978-8126442447.
- Aechikkanam, Santhosh. Jamanthikal Suganthikal. Mathrubhumi Books. ISBN 978-81-8266-427-2.
- Aechikkanam, Santhosh. Pakal Swapnathil Veyil Kayan Vanna Oru Nari. Mathrubhumi Books.

=== Literary criticism ===
- Aechikkanam, Santhosh, ed. (2010). Enmakaje Padanangal. Current Books. p. 104. ISBN 978-8124018897. Compilation of articles on "Enmakaje" by Ambikasuthan Mangadu.

== Filmography ==
Year	Title	Screenplay	Story	Dialogues	Director
2012	Nidra	Yes	No	Yes	Siddharth Bharathan
2012	Bachelor Party	Yes	No	Yes	Amal Neerad
2013	Annayum Rasoolum	Yes	No	Yes	Rajeev Ravi
2013	Idukki Gold	No	Yes	No	Aashiq Abu
2015	Chandrettan Evideya	Yes	Yes	Yes	Sidharth Bharathan
2014	Njan Steve Lopez	Yes	No	Yes	Rajeev Ravi
2017	Aby	Yes	Yes	Yes	Srikant Murali
