= International Network of Universities =

- Formation: 1998
- Type: Public
- Headquarters: Kingston University, London, UK
- Location: Global
- Members: 11
- Website: http://www.inunis.net/

The International Network of Universities (INU) is a global consortium of higher education institutions that actively seek international partnerships and experiences, create innovative programming and delivery methods, and embrace the internationalization movement. INU activities focus on:

- Advancing internationalization of member universities
- Preparing students for lives and careers as global citizens
- Engaging students and staff in international mobility programs
- Sharing experiences and best practices
- Delivering joint teaching and degrees
- Supporting early career researchers

New members can only be admitted according to INU criteria and procedures. Member universities are based in Argentina, Germany, Indonesia, Japan, South Africa, Spain, Sweden, United Kingdom, Ukraine and the United States of America.

== Network Activities ==
Activities include:

International Student Seminar for Global Citizenship and Peace, Hiroshima, Japan

International Student Conference on Global Citizenship, Banding, Indonesia

Henry Fong Award for Global Citizenship and Peace

Global Citizenship and Sustainable Futures online program

Staff Knowledge Exchange Program

Seed Money Funding

Researcher Mobility Program

== Governance ==
The council is the supreme decision-making body for the network. However, for day-to-day running the council elects an executive committee which is aided by the secretariat. The INU Constitution can be found here.

== Council ==
The INU is governed by a council on which each network member has a seat. Each member is entitled to one vote per institution on proposals presented. Membership on the council is institutional. The council is chaired by the INU president. The presidency of the network is currently held by European University Viadrina (Germany). The council meets bi-annually, and meetings are hosted in rotation amongst the network members.

== Secretariat ==
The administration and coordination of INU activities are handled by the INU secretariat. The secretariat is currently held at Kingston University London (United Kingdom).

== Member universities ==
Member universities
University	Location	Year of foundation
De Montfort University	United Kingdom	1992
Hiroshima University	Japan	1929
James Madison University	United States of America	1908
Kingston University	United Kingdom	1992
Malmö University	Sweden	1998
National University of the Littoral	Argentina	1889
Universitas Katolik Parahyangan	Indonesia	1955
Universitat Rovira i Virgili	Spain	1991
Viadrina European University	Germany	1991
Stellenbosch University	South Africa	1864
Osnabrück University	Germany	1974
Taras Shevchenko National University of Kyiv	Ukraine	1834
