= Aymanam John =

Indian writer (born 1953)

- Born: 10 April 1953 (age 73); Aymanam, Kottayam district
- Occupation: Short-story writer

Aymanam John (born 10 April 1953) is a Malayalam–language short-story writer. He hails from Aymanam, a small village in Kerala's Kottayam district which was made famous by Arundhati Roy through her 1997 novel The God of Small Things.

== Writings ==
John has also written several stories of this village including a collection of memoirs titled Ennittumundu Thaamarappoikakal, where he narrates his native place, the scenic countryside, the people and places and moments that he cherishes. His other famous books include Ithara Characharangalude Charitrapusthakam, Christmas Marathinte Veru and Aymanam Johninte Kathakal (which won the 2017 Odakkuzhal Award). He received the 2017 Kerala Sahitya Akademi Award for Story.
