= U. K. Kumaran =

Indian journalist (born 1950)

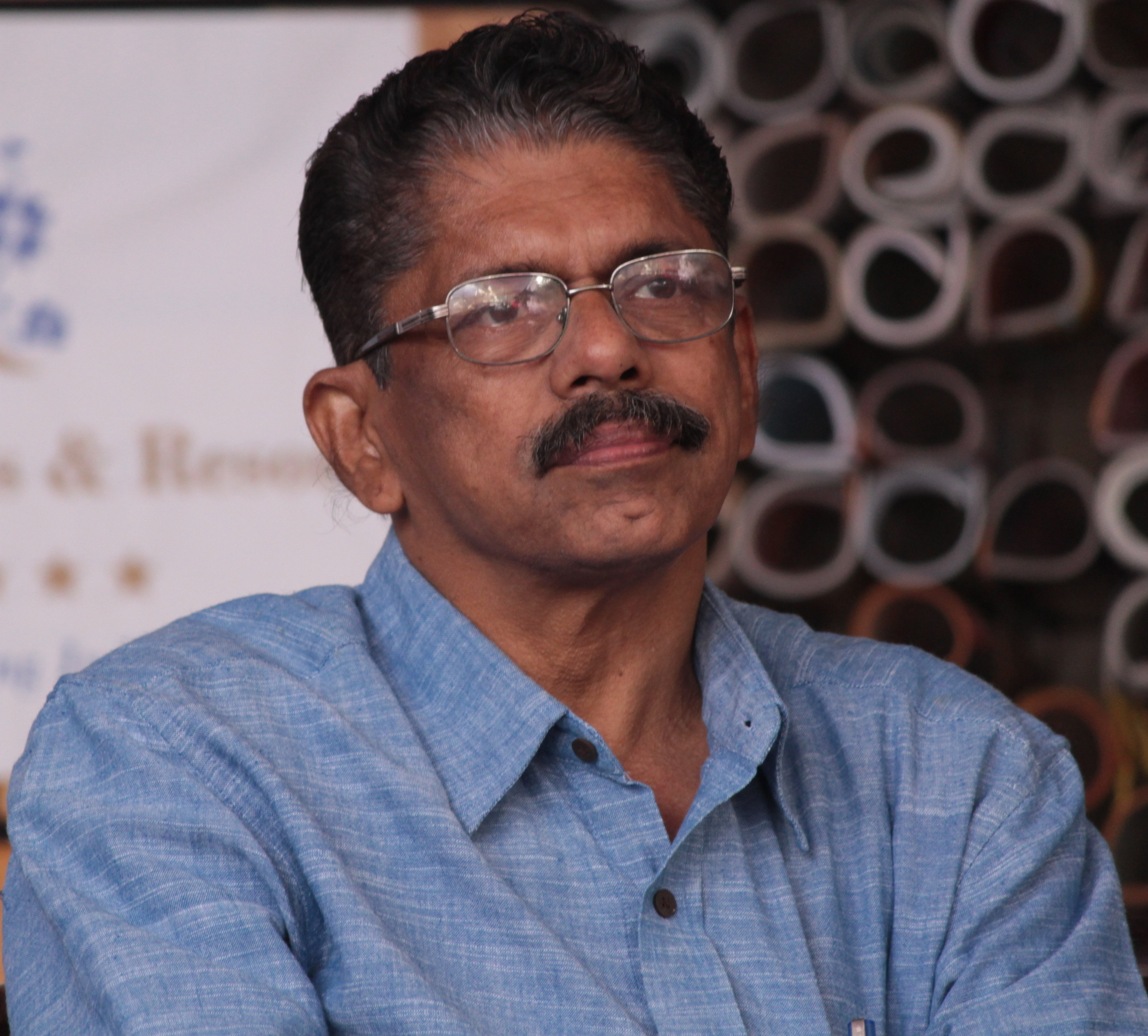
- Born: 11 May 1950 (age 76); Payyoli, Kozhikode, Kerala
- Occupations: Writer, journalist
- Writing career
- Pen name: U.K
- Language: Malayalam
- Genres: Novel, short story, essays
- Notable awards: Kerala Sahitya Akademi Award, Vayalar Award

U. K. Kumaran (born 11 May 1950) is a Malayalam-language novelist, short story writer, essayist and journalist from Kerala, India. He is a recipient of the Kerala Sahitya Akademi Award and Vayalar Award.

== Biography ==
According to The Hindu, the short story "Chalanam" "is a comprehensive landscape, peopled with characters and nature. Each character should grow and reach a point where they move towards a climax well. You cannot leave them mid-way, unfinished."

== Awards ==
Kumaran has received the Kerala Sahitya Akademi Award for Policukarante Penmakkal (2011) and Vaikom Chandrasekharan Nair Award for Thakshankunnu Swaroopam (2012). Vayalar Award 2016.

== Works ==
=== Novels ===
- Valayam
- Oridathum Ethathavar
- Mulappaal
- Aasakthi
- Ezhuthappettathu
- Ottavaakkil Oru Jivitam
- Thakshankunnu Swaroopam
- Kananullathalla Kazhchakkal
- Madutha kali

=== Short story collections ===
- Puthiya Irippidangal
- Madutha Kali
- Paavam Kallan
- Atayalangal Vannukondirikkunnu
- Rail Palathil Oru Kudumbam Dhyanikkunnu
- Achchan Urangunnilla
- Orale Thedi Oraal
- Ottakkoru Stri Odunnathinte Rahasyamenth?
- Onninum Orakalavumilla
- Veedu Samsarikkunnu
- Madhu Shaityam
- Madhye Ingane Kaanunna Nerath
- Matibhramangalude Kaalam
- Kudumba Museum
- Policukaarante Penmakkal
- Tiranjedutha Kathakal
- Sancharikkunna Govani
- Priyappetta Kathakal
- Kannadakalkkappurath
- Valanja Kaalulla Kuta
- Dambathya Katha
- Viraamasandhi

=== Novelettes ===
- Malarnnu Parakkunna Kakka
- Prasava Ward
- Ellam Kanunna Njan
- Oro Viliyum Kaathu
- Kaanaappurangal
- Addheham
- Bhoothakaala Sancharam
- A. T. M.
- Viralatayalangal Illathavarude Nagaram
- Priyappetta Novelettukal
- Dinaratrangalude Ennam
- Sanghaditham

=== Others ===
- Gandhiji (Biography)
- Oru Bandhu Kaathirukkunnu (Memoirs)
- Anubhavam, Orma, Yathra (Memoirs and Travel notes)
