= Kerala Sahitya Akademi Award for Literary Criticism =

Literary award

The Kerala Sahitya Academy Award for Literary Criticism is given every year by the Kerala Sahitya Akademi (Kerala Literary Academy) to a Malayalam writer for writing literary criticism. It is one of the 12 categories of the annual Kerala Sahitya Akademi Award.

== Awardees ==
Year	Book	Author	Image
1966	Kala Jeevitham Thanne	Kuttikrishna Marar	
1967	Ismkalkkappuram	S. Guptan Nair	
1968	Manasikamaya Adimatham	Thayat Sankaran	
1969	Malayala Piravi	K. Raghavan Pillai	
1970	Kala Darsanam	K. M. Daniel	
1971	Upaharam	K. Bhaskaran Nair	
1972	Nataka Darpanam	N. N. Pillai	
1973	Sita Muthal Satyavati Vare	Lalithambika Antharjanam	
1974	Kerala Panineeya Bhashyam	C. L. Antony	
1975	Paschathya Sahitya Thatwasastram	K. M. Tharakan	
1976	Cherukatha: Innale Innu	M. Achuthan	
1977	Nalini Enna Kavyashilpam	Nitya Chaitanya Yati	
1978	Kairaleedhwani	P. K. Narayana Pillai	
1979	Vallatholinte Kavyashilpam	N. V. Krishna Warrier	
1980	Varnaraaji	M. Leelavathy	
1981	Urmees Tharakante Upanyasangal	P. V. Hormis Tharakan	
1982	Chitayile Velicham	M. N. Vijayan	
1983	Ayyappa Panikerude Lekhanangal	Ayyappa Paniker	
1984	Malayala Sahitya Vimarshanam	Sukumar Azhikode	
1985	Avadhaaranam	M. K. Sanu	
1986	Kaviyum Kavitayum Kurekkoodi	P. Narayana Kurup	
1987	Prathipathram Bhashanabhedam	N. Krishna Pillai	
1988	Marxist Soundarya Sastram: Utbhavavum Valarchayum	P. Govinda Pillai	
1989	A. P. P.yude Prabandhangal	A. P. P. Nambudiri	
1990	Chhathravum Chamaravum	M. P. Sankunni Nair	
1991	Kalpanikatha	Hridayakumari	
1992	Anwayam	R. Viswanathan	
1993	Kerala Kavitayile Kaliyum Chiriyum	Prasannarajan	
1994	Jeevante Kaiyoppu	Asha Menon	
1995	Aksharavum Adhunikathayum	E. V. Ramakrishnan	
1996	Novel Sahitya Patanangal	D. Benjamin	
1997	Pitru Ghatikaram	P. K. Rajasekharan	
1998	Uttaradhunika Vartamanavum Vamsavaliyum	K. P. Appan	
1999	Sahityam, Samskaram, Samooham	V. Aravindakshan	
2000	Patavum Porulum	C. Rajendran	
2001	Athmavinte Murivukal	M. Thomas Mathew	
2002	Kathayum Paristhithiyum	G. Madhusoodanan	
2003	Malayaliyude Rathrikal	K. C. Narayanan	
2004	Anuseelanam	K. P. Sankaran	
2005	Prathivadangal	V. C. Sreejan	
2006	Kavitayude Gramangal	E. P. Rajagopalan	
2007	Edasseri Kavita: Shilpavicharam	K. P. Mohanan	
2008	Marithira Kathuninnappol	V. Rajakrishnan	
2009	Akhyanathinte Adarukal	K. S. Ravikumar	
2010	Malayala Novel: Innum Innaleyum	M. R. Chandrasekharan	
2011	Vakkukalum Vasthukkalum	B. Rajeevan	
2012	Pennezhuthunna Jeevitham	N. K. Raveendran	
2013	Ajnjathavumayulla Abhimukham	Sunil P. Ilayidom	
2014	Unarvinte Lahariyilekku	M. Gangadharan	
2015	Vamsa Chihnangal	C. R. Parameswaran	
2016	Asan Kavitha: Sthree Purusha Samavakyangalile Kalaapom	S. Sudheesh	
2017	Kavithayude Jeevacharithram	Kalpatta Narayanan	
2018	Adhunikathayude Pinampuram	P. P. Raveendran	
2019	Pantharum Vazhiyambalangalum	Dr. K. M. Anil	
2020	Vyloppilli Kavitha: Oru Idathupaksha Vayana	Dr. P. Soman	
2021	Vakkile Nerangal	N. Ajayakumar	
2022	Ethrayethra Preranakal	S. Saradakkutty	
2023	Bhupadam Thala Thirikkumpol	P. Pavithran	
2024	Ramayanathinte Charithrasanchaarangal	G. Dileepan	

== See also ==
- List of awards for contributions to culture
