= 2015 Kerala Sahitya Akademi Awards =

Indian literary awards

Kerala Sahitya Akademi Award
- Awarded for: Outstanding books of literary merit
- Date: 28 March 2017
- Location: Trichur
- Country: India
- Presented by: Kerala Sahitya Akademi
- First award: 1958

The 2015 Kerala Sahitya Akademi Award was announced on 28 March 2017. The award has been given annually since 1958 by the Kerala Sahitya Akademi (Kerala Literary Academy), to a Malayalam writer for a book of outstanding literary merit.

== Winners ==
Category	Recipient	Work	Image
Poetry	S. Rameshan	Hemanthathile Pakshi	
Novel	U. K. Kumaran	Thakshankunnu Swaroopam	
Story	Ashitha	Ashithayude Kathakal	
Drama	Jino Joseph	Mathi	
Literary Criticism	C. R. Parameswaran	Vamsa Chihnangal	
Biography and Autobiography	Ibrahim Vengara	Green Room	
Travelogue	V. G. Thampi; O. K. Johny	Europe: Aatma Chihnangal; Bhutan Dinangal	
Humour	Dr. S. D. P. Namboothiri	Vedi Vattom	
Children's Literature	Ezhacherry Ramachandran	Sunny Cherukkanum Sangeetha Pengalum	
Scholarly Literature	K. N. Ganesh	Prakritiyum Manushyanum	
Translation	Guru Muni Narayana Prasad	Soundarya Lahari	
Overall Contributions	O. V. Usha; Mundoor Sethumadhavan; V. Sukumaran; T. B. Venugopala Panicker; Prayar Prabhakaran; Dr. K. Sugathan		

== Endowments ==
- I. C. Chacko Award: P. M. Girish (Arivum Bhashayum, Linguistics/Grammar/Scientific study)
- C. B. Kumar Award: K. Aravindakshan (Adhikarathinte Aasakthikal, Essay)
- K. R. Namboodiri Award: Dr. T. Arya Devi (Nyaya Darsanam, Medical literature)
- Kanakasree Award: Santhi Jayakumar (Eerppam Niranja Murikal, Poetry)
- Geetha Hiranyan Award: Aswathi Sasikumar (Josephinte Manam, Stories)
- G. N. Pillai Award: Manoj Mathirappally (Jaiva Rashtreeyavum Janasanjayavum, Nonfiction)
- Kuttippizha Award: No award in 2015

== Fellowship ==
Recipient	Image
U. A. Khader	
Sarah Joseph	
