= M. N. Vijayan =

Indian orator and writer (1930–2007)

- Born: 8 June 1930; Lokamaleshwaram, British Raj
- Died: 3 October 2007 (aged 77); Thrissur, Kerala, India
- Education: Government Boys High School Kodungallur; Maharaja's College, Ernakulam; Government Law College, Ernakulam
- Occupations: Writer; Orator
- Years active: 1952–2007
- Spouse: Sharada
- Children: 3
- Parents: Pathiyasseril Narayana Menon (father); Mooliyil Kochammu Amma (mother)
- Awards: 1982 Kerala Sahitya Akademi Award

Moolayil Narayana Vijayan (Malayalam: [muːlɐjil n̪aːɾaːjɐɳɐn ʋid͡ʒɐjɐn]), popularly known as Vijayan Maash (Malayalam: [ʋid͡ʒɐjɐn maːʂɨ]) (8 June 1930 – 3 October 2007) was an Indian academic, orator, columnist and writer of Malayalam literature. Known for his leftist ideals and oratorical skills, Vijayan was the president of the Purogamana Kala Sahitya Sangham (Progressive Association for Art and Letters) and served as the editor of Deshabhimani. He published a number of books of which Chithayile Velicham (The Light in the Pyre) received the Kerala Sahitya Akademi Award for Literary Criticism in 1982.

== Biography ==
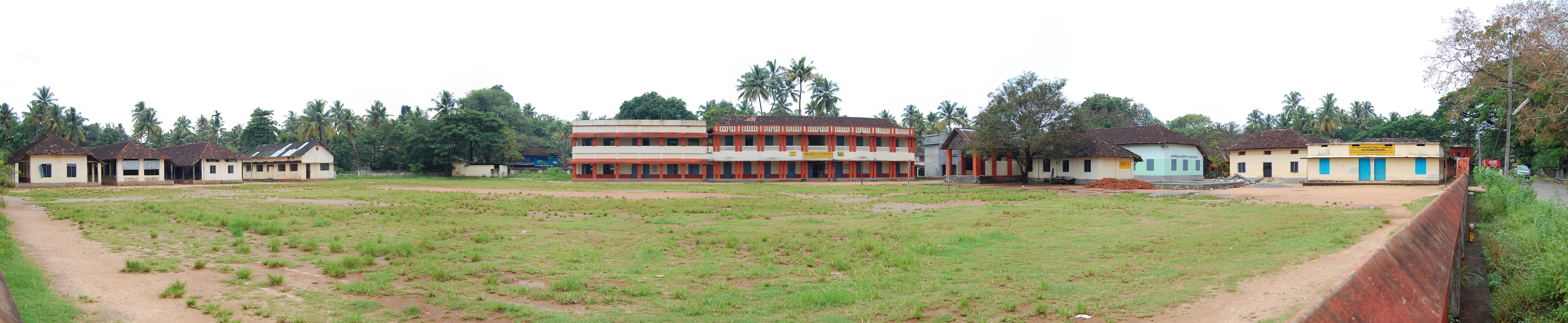
Government Boys High School, Kodungallur, Vijayan's alma mater

M. N. Vijayan was born on 8 June 1930 to Pathiyasseril Narayana Menon and Mooliyil Kochammu Amma at Lokamaleshwaram, a small village near Kodungallur in Thrissur district of the south Indian state of Kerala. Vijayan got his family name, Mooliyil, through matrilineal succession.

Vijayan's schooling was at Pathinettarayalam Lower Primary School and Government Boys High School Kodungallur after which he did his graduate and post-graduate studies at Maharaja's College, Ernakulam to earn a master's degree in Malayalam literature from the University of Madras. He also studied law at the Government Law College, Ernakulam and was associated with the Students Federation of India during his college days. He started his career in 1952 as a lecturer at The New College, Chennai and later moved to University College, Thiruvananthapuram, but his stay at Thiruvananthapuram was short. In 1960, he joined Brennen College, Thalassery as a member of faculty at its department of Malayalam and served the institution until he retired from service in 1985.

== Political and journalism career ==
From 1960 to 1999 M. N. Vijayan stayed at Dharmadam, Thalassery. Vijayan worked as the editor of the cultural weekly Deshabhimani owned by the Communist Party of India (Marxist) (CPI(M)). He was President of Purogamana Kala Sahitya Sangham (Progressive Association for Art and Letters) and Adhinivesha Prathirodha Samithi (Council for Resisting Imperialist Globalisation), a leftist think-tank based in Kerala which collaborated with the CPI(M).

He was removed as editor of Deshabhimani when leaders of the provincial Communist Party felt he did not adhere to the party line. He opposed the policy of some state level leaders and other leftist intellectuals to accept foreign funding of political work. He was also for a time the editor of the controversial periodical Padom, notably criticising a Kerala state government program called People's Campaign for Decentralised Planning (People's Plan) and its creator Thomas Isaac. Vijayan and Professor Sudheesh's articles in Padom against the "people's plan", a program aimed at decentralisation of power, became a controversial issue. Later a Kerala court ruled that the allegations of foreign funding of the Kerala Sasthra Sahithya Parishad (KSSP) had been proven by Sudheesh and Vijayan. Vijayan and Sudheesh had started Paatom in 2000, and started to attack CPI(M)'s social democratic stands and attitude towards World Bank and IMF. He resigned from Purogamana Kala Sahithya Sangham as a result of a disagreement with M. A. Baby, then in charge of the CPI(M).

The cultural programme Manaveeyam of CPI(M)-led LDF government of Kerala was criticised for the extravagance of the programmes and the elitist audience to which the ps catered, and also for the fact that the "people's art and culture" gave way to bourgeois concepts under the influence of neoliberalism. Vijayan also led an ideological debate against social democratic deviations. When the leader of Kerala Shastra Sahitya Parishad (a pro-CPI(M) Science forum) M. P. Parameswaran went ahead with his "theory of the fourth world" campaign, it was alleged that a theory that had been opposed by the late ideologue of the party, E. M. S. Namboodiripad, was now being resurrected after his death. Vijayan and his followers resisted P. Govinda Pillai's controversial critical remarks against A. K. Gopalan, Namboodiripad and others on ideological grounds. Though, initially, CPI(M) leadership was forced to expel Parameswaran and Depromote Pillai from the state committee because of the high reputation that Vijayan enjoyed among the party supporters, writers and the literate, later the social democratic group got control over the CPI(M) organisation. There were similar attacks against other left-leaning intellectuals like Dr. B. Ekbal (leading to Ekbal's expulsion from CPI(M)) who were trying to re-examine the direction of left-wing politics in Kerala.

Vijayan did not attend many public meetings during his last years as a result of his ill health, but continued to write weekly columns in Samakalina Malayalam, an Indian Express group of publications, Janashakthi and Maruvakku. The column was originally published weekly in Deshabhimani until he parted ways with the paper. He was also the editor of the monthly Maruvaakku.

== Writings ==
Most of Vijayan's publications are compilations of his speeches and He was considered to be a powerful orator. He used psychology, Marxism and social science as tools to analyse life and literature. Some prominent writers, including M. Krishnan Nair and Thinakkal Padmanabhan, have said that Vijayan's writings are difficult to understand, as he does not follow conventional grammatical structures. V. C. Sreejan criticizes Vijayan's style, arguing that it is densely figurative, hence vague and often meaningless. Vijayan was a pioneer of the use of psychological criticism in Malayalam literature, and influenced contemporary Kerala culture.

Vijayan's works were nominated on several occasions for literary awards, but in keeping with a general aversion to institutionalism, he rejected any state-sponsored awards that he won.

=== List of published works ===
- Vijayan. M. N (2002). Bhayavum Abhayavum (in Malayalam). Chintha Publishers.
- M. N. Vijayan (1981). Chithayile Velicham. Current Books. ASIN B007E4WEQI.
- M. N. Vijayan. Varnagalude Sangeetham. H & C Books.
- Vijayan. M. N (1999). Fascisathinte Manashasthram (in Malayalam) (0 ed.). Chintha Publishers.
- M. N. Vijayan (2009). Marubhoomikal Pookumbol. Current Books. ISBN 978-8122608281. ASIN 8122608280.
- M. N. Vijayan (2012). Chumaril Chithramezhuthumbol. Green Books. ISBN 979-8188582722.
- M. N. Vijayan (2013). Vyloppilli. Mathrubhumi Books. ISBN 9788182655508.
- M. N. Vijayan (2015). Basheer. Mathrubhumi Books.
- Vijayan. M. N (2002). Adhikaram, Anuragam, Athmarahasyangal (in Malayalam) (0 ed.). Chinta Publishers.
- Vijayan. M. N (2003). Fascism: Prathyaya Shasthram, Prayogam, Pradhirodham (in Malayalam) (0 ed.). Chintha.
- M. N. Vijayan (2018). Changampuzha. Mathrubhumi Books. ISBN 9788182676138.
- M. N. Vijayan (2012). M.N.Vijayan Sampoorna Krithikal. Current Books. ISBN 978-8122608502.
- M. N. Vijayan. Manushyar Parkkunna Lokangal. Mathrubhumi Books. ISBN 8182642167.
- Vijayan. M. N (2006). Kaleidoscope:: M. N. Vijayante Ormmakkurippukal (in Malayalam) (0 ed.). Nishagandhi Publications.
- Vijayan. M. N (2001). Kazhchappadu (in Malayalam) (0 ed.). Chinta Publishers.
- M. N. Vijayan (2010). Kesariyude Charithra Gaveshanangal (3 volumes) (in Malayalam) (1 ed.). State Institute of Languages, Kerala.
- Vijayan. M. N (2011). Marar Vimarsham (in Malayalam) (0 ed.). School Of Marxian Cultural Studies.
- Vijayan. M. N (2006). Olichu Kadathiya Ayudhangal (in Malayalam) (1 ed.). Kairali Books.
- Vijayan M.N. (2004). M. R. B.: Jeevitham, Dharshanam, Kruthikal (in Malayalam) (0 ed.). Current Books Thrissur.
- Vijayan. M. N (2004). Kalapathinte Utharangal (in Malayalam) (0 ed.). Fabian Books.
- Vijayan. M. N (2003). Adhiniveshathinte Adiyozhukkukal (in Malayalam) (0 ed.). Left View, Calicut.
- None; Vijayan. m.n (2001). Kavithayude Nottandu (2 volumes) (in Malayalam) (0 ed.). National Book Stall.
- Nil; Vijayan. m.n (2008). Kathayude Nottandu (2 volumes) (in Malayalam) (1 ed.). Sahithya Pravathaka Sahakarana.
- Vijayan. M. N (2005). Puraykkumel Chanja Maram (in Malayalam) (1 ed.). Chinta Publishers.
- Vijayan, M. N. (1992). Varnangalude sangeetham. Kozhikode: Mulberry.
- M. N. Vijayan (2012). Doorakazhchakal (Interviews). New Books.
- M N Vijayan (2010). Sambhashanangal: Interviews. Olive Books.
- Pradhirodhangal പ്രതിരോധങ്ങൾ (Resistances)
- Kavithayum Manashastravum കവിതയും മനശാസ്ത്രവും (Poetry And Psychology)
- Sheersasanam ശീർഷാസനം (Standing Upside Down)
- Vaakkum Manassum (The Speech and The Thought)
- Puthiya Varthamanangal (Latest News)
- Noothana Lokangal നൂതന ലോകങ്ങൾ (New Worlds)
- M.N. Vijayante Prabhashanangal എം.എൻ. വിജയന്റെ പ്രഭാഷണങ്ങൾ (M.N. Vijayan's Speeches)
- Samskaravum Swathanthriavum സംസ്കാരവും സ്വാതന്ത്ര്യവും (The Culture and the Freedom)

== Intellectual mentor and counselor ==
Though not a qualified medical practitioner, Vijayan worked for many years as a pro bono counsellor, using Freudian techniques. Many writers, intellectuals, journalists and political activists have described him as an intellectual mentor. The November 2007 issue of Samayam Masika was devoted to articles by a variety of public figures about Vijayan and his influence, both on them personally and upon others, including M. T. Vasudevan Nair (writer, film director, Jnanpith Award winner), N. Prabhakaran (writer, academic), Mohanan Cherukadu (writer), Appukkuttan Vallikkunnu (journalist), P. Surendran (writer), Dr. Abdul Azeez (Doctor), Kunhappa Pattanoor (poet), Umesh Babu K.C. (Poet and political activist), A. V. Pavitran (writer), Anil Kumar A. V. (journalist, political activist), Vatsalan Vatuseeri (writer), Prabhakaran Pazhassi (writer, Professor), Choorayi Chandran (Political activist, Educationalist), N. Shasidharan (writer).

His studies on Vailoppilli, a well known Malayalam poet, and especially the poems "Mampazham" and "Sahyante makan", using Freudian techniques attained wide acclaim. He was a staunch critic of communal organisations and he used a significant part of his oratory and writings to back Communist Party of India (Marx) in their ideological and material resistance against the invasion of fascist forces with venomous separatist aims in Tellicherry and Kerala. M.N.Vijayan, his wife and his residence at Dharmadam, Thalassey, provided a haven for people who faced psychological problems. With utmost affection Vijayan mash and his wife served them. He is the general editor of Nammute Sahityam Nammute Samooham (Our Society Our Literature), a four volume research book on literature and society of Kerala.

Vijayan became a mentor for many writers, leftist politicians and journalists. He was a critic of NGOs like Kerala Sasthra Sahithya Parishad which polluted the sensibilities of Malayalees. Vijayan died while he was addressing a press conference in Thrissur, explaining how non- governmentally funded organisations like Kerala Sasthra Sahithya Parishad function in Kerala, camouflaging their imperialist agenda by wearing a leftist mask. Parishath and its activities lost credibility when Ernakulam Chief Judicial Magistrate dismissed the defamation case filed against Paatom, a magazine which exposed the fishy trails of such organisations. "You are selling your credibility... It is hijacking democracy ...", Vijayan said about Parishath and its supporters in the last press conference. Thrissur Current Books and Akam Samithi Thalassey published the early works of M.N.Vijayan. Thrissur Current Books published the Complete Works of M.N. Vijayan in ten volumes under different titles, like literature, politics, culture, interviews, speeches, biography, memoirs, etc. The first M.N.Vijayan library was inaugurated at Kannur. Govt. Brennen College Malayalam department has constituted the M.N.Vijayan endowment in 2010 for outstanding students of Malayalam literature.

== Personal life ==
Vijayan was married to Sharada and the couple had a son, V. S. Anilkumar, a writer and an academic working at Kannur University and two daughters, Sujatha Balachandran, a doctorate degree holder in agricultural science and Sunitha Rajagopal. He suffered a massive heart attack during a press conference at Thrissur Press Club on 3 October 2007 and though he was taken to Amala Institute of Medical Sciences, he died the same day, at the age of 77. His biography, written by K. Balakrishnan, was published by Kerala Bhasha Institute in 2015, on the 8th anniversary of Vijayan's death.
