= 2014 Kerala Sahitya Akademi Awards =

Indian literary awards

Kerala Sahitya Akademi Award
- Awarded for: Outstanding books of literary merit
- Date: 29 February 2016
- Location: Thrissur
- Country: India
- Presented by: Kerala Sahitya Akademi
- First award: 1958

The 2014 Kerala Sahitya Akademi Award was announced on 29 February 2016. The award has been given each year since 1958 by the Kerala Sahitya Akademi (Kerala Literary Academy), to a Malayalam writer for an outstanding book of literary merit.

== Winners ==
Category	Recipient	Work
Poetry	P. N. Gopikrishnan	Idikkaloori Panampattadi
Novel	T. P. Rajeevan	K.T.N. Kottur-Ezhuthum Jeevithavum
Story	V. R. Sudheesh	Bhavana Bhedanam
Drama	V. K. Prabhakaran	Ettettu Malayalan
Literary Criticism	Dr. M. Gangadharan	Unarvinte Lahariyilekku
Biography and Autobiography	C. V. Balakrishnan	Paralmeen Neenthunna Padam
Travelogue	K. A. Francis	Pottekkattum Sreeyathoonum Balidweepum
Humour	T. G. Vijayakumar	Mazha Peythu Thorumpol
Children's Literature	M. Sivaprasad	Anathookkam Velli
Scholarly Literature	Dr. A. Achuthan	Paristhithi Patanathinu Oru Amukham
Translation	Sunil Njaliyath	Chokher Bali
Overall Contributions	Sreedharan Champad; Velayudhan Panikkassery; George Irumbayam; Methil Radhakrishnan; Desamangalam Ramakrishnan; Chandrakala S. Kammath	

== Endowments ==
- I. C. Chacko Award: A. M. Sreedharan (Beary Bhasha Nighantu, Linguistics/Grammar/Scientific study)
- C. B. Kumar Award: T. J. S. George (Ottayan, Essay)
- K.R. Namboodiri Award: P. N. Das (Oruthulli Velicham, Medical literature)
- Kanakasree Award: Sandhya N. P. (Swasikkunna Shabdham Mathram, Poetry)
- Geetha Hiranyan Award: V. M. Devadas (Marana Sahayi, Stories)
- G. N. Pillai Award: Manoj Mathirappally (Keralathile Adivasikal: Kalayum Samskaravum, Nonfiction)
- Kuttippizha Award: P. P. Raveendran (Ethirezhuthukal: Bhavukathvathinte Bhoomisasthram, Criticism/Study)

== Fellowship ==
- Prof. M. Thomas Mathew
- Kavalam Narayana Panicker
