= Kerala Sahitya Akademi Award for Scholarly Literature =

Recognition for scholarly literature in Malayalam

The Kerala Sahitya Akademi Award for Scholarly Literature is given every year by the Kerala Sahitya Akademi (Kerala Literary Academy) to a Malayalam writer for an outstanding work of scholarly literature (science literature). It is one of the twelve categories of the Kerala Sahitya Akademi Award.

== Awardees ==
Year	Book	Writer	Image	Ref.
1989	Keralam: Mannum Manushyanum	Thomas Isaac		
1990	Swathanthrya Samaram	M. N. Sathyaardhi		
1991	Keraleeyatha: Charitra Manangal	M. R. Raghava Varier		
1992	Keralathile Natan Kalakal	A. K. Nambiar		
1993	Darsanathinte Pookkal	Paulos Mar Gregorios		
1994	Jaivamanushyan	Anand		
1995	Gandhiyude Jeevitha Darsanam	K. Aravindakshan		
1996	Padayani	Kadammanitta Vasudevan Pillai		
1997	Kerathile Chuvar Chitrangal	M. G. Sasibhooshan		
1998	Parinamathinte Parinamam	A. N. Namboothiri		
1999	Adimudranam Bharathathilum Malayalathilum	K. M. Govi		
2000	Veda Sabda Ratnakaram	D. Babu Paul		
2001	Devaspandanam	M. V. Devan		
2002	Chitrakala Oru Samagrapadanam	R. Ravindranath		
2003	Malayala Sangeetha Nataka Charitram	K. Sreekumar		
2004	DNA Vazhi Jeevatmavilekku	C. A. Ninan		
2005	Marumakkathayam	K. T. Ravi Varma		
2006	Kanvazhikal Kazhchavattangal	Sunil P. Ilayidom		
2007	Kerala Samskarika Charitra Nighantu	S. K. Vasanthan		
2008	Swathva Rashtreeyam	P. K. Pokker		
2009	Sthalam Kalam Kala	Vijayakumar Menon		
2010	Kunjukanangalkku Vasantham	T. Pradeep		
2011	Eenavum Thalavum	L. S. Rajagopalan		
2012	Samskaramudrakal	Naduvattom Gopalakrishnan		
2013	Samsmruthi	K. Rajasekharan Nair		
2014	Paristhithi Patanathinu Oru Amukham	A. Achuthan		
2015	Prakritiyum Manushyanum	K. N. Ganesh		
2016	Chavittu Nadaka Vijnanakosam	V. P. Joseph Valiyaveettil		
2017	Nadivijnaneeyam	N. J. K. Nair		
2018	Padartham Muthal Daivakanam Vare	K. Babu Joseph		
2019	Shastra Sankethika Vidyakalude Charithram	R. V. G. Menon		
2020	Marxisavum Feminisavum Charithraparamaya Vishakalanam	T. K. Anandi		
2021	Kalavastha Vyathiyanavum Keralavum: Soochanakalum Karanangalum	Gopakumar Cholayil		
2022	Bhashasoothranam: Porulum Vazhikalum	C. M. Muraleedharan		
2022	Malayali: Oru Janithaka Vayana	K. Sethuraman		
2023	Indiaye Veededukkal	B. Rajeevan		
2024	Nirmithabuddhikalathe Samoohika Rashtreeya Jeevitham	Deepak P.		
