= Kerala Sahitya Akademi Award for Biography and Autobiography =

Literary award for Malayam writers

The Kerala Sahitya Akademi Award for Biography and Autobiography is an award presented every year by the Kerala Sahitya Akademi (Kerala Literary Academy) to a Malayalam writer for writing a biography or autobiography of literary merit. It is one of the twelve categories of the Kerala Sahitya Akademi Award.

== Awardees ==
Year	Book	Author	Image
1980	Sahasra Poornima	C. K. Revathi Amma	
1992	Arangu Kaanaatha Nadan	Thikkodiyan	
1993	Ardhaviramam	Amarthyananda	
1994	Pathikayum Vazhiyorathe Manideepangalum	K. Kalyanikutty Amma	
1995	Viplava Smaranakal: Bhagam Onnu	Puthupally Raghavan	
1996	Charitrathinoppam Nadanna Oraal	A. V. Anil Kumar	
1997	Rajyadrohiyaya Rajyasnehi	T. Venugopal	
1998	Sucheendram Rekhakal	T. N. Gopakumar	
1999	Kodumkattuyarthiya Kaalam	Joseph Edamaruku	
2000	V. R. Krishnan Ezhuthachan: Athmakatha	V. R. Krishnan Ezhuthachan	
2001	A. K. Pillai: Adarsangalude Raktasakshi	A. Radhakrishnan	
2002	Achan	Neelan	
2003	Bertrand Russell	V. Babusenan	
2004	Orachante Ormmakkuripukal	T. V. Eachara Warrier	
2005	Panampilly Govinda Menon: Charitravazhiyile Dipasikha	L. V. Harikumar	
2006	Ente Jivitham	G. Janardhana Kurup	
2007	Pavana Parvam	Parvathi Pavanan	
2008	Smruthi Parvam	P. K. Warrier	
2009	Ghoshayathra	T. J. S. George	
2010	Anubhavangal Anubhaavangal	P. K. R. Warrier	
2011	Athmakatha	K. R. Gowri Amma	
2012	Ente Pradakshina Vazhikal	S. Jayachandran Nair	
2013	Swarabhedangal	Bhagyalakshmi	
2014	Paralmeen Neenthunna Paadam	C. V. Balakrishnan	
2015	Green Room	Ibrahim Vengara	
2016	AKG: Oru Sampoorna Jeevacharithram	Chanthavila Murali	
2017	Thakkijja, Ente Jayil Jeevitham	Jayachandran Mokeri	
2018	Athmayanam	Muni Narayana Prasad	
2019	Jalakangal: Oru Charithranweshiyude Vazhikal Kazhchakal	M. G. S. Narayanan	
2020	Mukthakantam V. K. N.	K. Raghunathan	
2021	Attupokatha Ormakal	Prof. T. J. Joseph	
2021	Ethiru	M. Kunjaman	
2022	News Room	B. R. P. Bhaskar	
2023	Oranweshanathinte Katha	K. Venu	
2024	Njan Enna Bhaavam	K. Rajasekharan Nair	
