= Kaliyugam (1973 film) =

- Directed by: K. S. Sethumadhavan
- Written by: Mundoor Sethumadhavan; Thoppil Bhasi (dialogues)
- Screenplay by: Thoppil Bhasi
- Story by: Mundoor Sethumadhavan
- Based on: Kaliyugam by Mundoor Sethumadhavan
- Produced by: M. O. Joseph
- Starring: Sudheer; Jayabharathi; Bahadoor; KPAC Lalitha; Adoor Bhasi; Muthukulam Raghavan Pillai
- Cinematography: Balu Mahendra
- Edited by: M. S. Mani
- Music by: G. Devarajan
- Production company: Manjilas
- Distributed by: Manjilas
- Release date: 12 April 1973
- Country: India
- Language: Malayalam

Kaliyugam is a 1973 Indian Malayalam film directed by K. S. Sethumadhavan and produced by M. O. Joseph. The film stars Sudheer, Bahadoor, Jayabharathi, KPAC Lalitha, Adoor Bhasi and Muthukulam Raghavan Pillai in the lead roles. The film has musical score by G. Devarajan.

== Cast ==
- Sudheer
- Bahadoor
- Jayabharathi
- KPAC Lalitha
- Adoor Bhasi
- Muthukulam Raghavan Pillai
- Sankaradi
- Sreelatha Namboothiri
- T. R. Omana
- Pala Thankam
- Paravoor Bharathan
- Philomina
- Ponjikkara Kalyani Amma
- S. A. Fareed
- S. P. Pillai
- Sreenu
- Sujatha

== Soundtrack ==
The music was composed by G. Devarajan and the lyrics were written by Vayalar.

No.	Song	Singers	Lyrics	Length (m:ss)
1	"Bhoomi Petta Makalallo"	P. Leela, P. Madhuri, Chorus	Vayalar	
2	"Chottaanikkara Bhagavathi"	K. J. Yesudas	Vayalar	
3	"Paalam Kadakkuvolam"	P. Jayachandran, Ayiroor Sadasivan	Vayalar	
4	"Shivashambho Shambho" (Naranaayingane)	P. Madhuri	Vayalar	
