= Rugma =

- Promotional Notice
- Directed by: P. G. Viswambharan
- Written by: Thoppil Bhasi
- Story by: Chandrakala S. Kammath
- Based on: Rugma by Chandrakala S. Kammath
- Produced by: Cherupushpam Jose Kutty; Royal Achankunju for Royal Movie Makers
- Starring: Mammootty; Venu Nagavally; Raghuvaran; Menaka; Seema
- Cinematography: C. E. Babu
- Edited by: G. Venkittaraman
- Music by: M. B. Sreenivasan
- Production company: Royal Movie Makers
- Distributed by: Royal Movie Makers
- Release date: 28 November 1983
- Country: India
- Language: Malayalam

Rugma is a 1983 Indian Malayalam-language social drama film, directed by P. G. Viswambharan, starring Mammootty, Menaka, Seema and Venu Nagavally.

== Plot ==
The film is the story of Rugma and her struggle to raise her daughter after the death of her husband. The story explores personal sacrifice, and the difficulties Rugma faces as a woman caught in complex social situations.

== Cast ==
- Seema as Rugma Reghu
- Mammootty as Reghu
- Venu Nagavally as
- Menaka as Elizabeth Chacko
- Raghuvaran as Joseph
- Shubha as Thressia Chacko
- Sukumari as Thressia's Mother
- Rohini as Prayaga
- Adoor Bhasi as Bhatt
- T. G. Ravi as Chacko
- Charuhasan as Raman Shenoy
- Kunchan as Narayana Pai
- Alummoodan

== Soundtrack ==
The music was composed by M. B. Sreenivasan and the lyrics were written by P. Bhaskaran.

No.	Song	Singers	Lyrics	Length (m:ss)
1	"Ananyaashchinthayantho"	K. J. Yesudas		
2	"Ghoraandhakaarathin" (Bit)		P. Bhaskaran	
3	"Omanathinkal Kidaavo" (Bit)			
4	"Remember Remember September"	K. J. Yesudas, Sujatha Mohan	P. Bhaskaran	
5	"Sankalpa Pushpavanam"	K. J. Yesudas	P. Bhaskaran	
6	"Sree Padmanaabha"	K. J. Yesudas	P. Bhaskaran	
