= K. Thayat =

Indian writer

Thayat Kunjananthan, commonly known as K. Thayat (17 February 1927 – 4 December 2011) was an Indian writer of children's literature and plays in Malayalam–language. He has written 42 books and over a hundred radio plays. He was also a school teacher and has received various awards in the field of literature as well as central and state awards for excellence in teaching.

== Biography ==
He was born on 17 February 1927 in Panniyannur near Tellicherry in the present-day Indian state of Kerala, as the son of Chandu Nambiar and Lakshmi Amma. His brother Thayat Sankaran was a famous writer and Thayat Balan was a social activist. He completed his education at Kunnummal Higher Elementary School, BEMP High School, Kathirur Govt. High School and Brennen College.

Prior to joining the teaching profession, he worked for a short time as a ticket seller in cinema theatres, as a clerk in the Sub-Registrar's Office, as a non-operator in a military camp, and as a clerk in the Madras General Hospital. He also worked in Calicut All India Radio station. After a few months of teaching at Punnassery UP School in Puthiyara, Calicut, and Lakshmivilasam LP School in Chokli, Kannur, he joined Panoor UP School in 1952. He retired from the service in 1982 when he was the headmaster of the same school. He died on 4 December 2011 at the age of 85.

== Literary life ==
He has written 42 books which include story, poetry, drama, children's literature and essays. His first collection of stories was Puthenkani, published in 1951. His first collection of poems, Palpathakal, was published in 1953. His Naam Changala Potticha Katha is an exciting story of many freedom fighters who sacrificed their lives for the liberation of India. He was instrumental in writing the book Swathanthrya Samaram Kuttikalkk (History of the Freedom Struggle for Children), published by the State Institute of Children's Literature. Thayat was also an excellent orator. Thayat also authored over a hundred radio plays. His Thottakkaran was the first play by a non-employee to be aired on All India Radio, Calicut.

== List of works ==
Children's literature

- Mela
- Naivedyam
- Palppathakal
- Nadukanichuram
- Mazha Mazha Thenmazha
- Viddiyude Swargam
- Yakshiyum Kathakalum
- Snehamanu Sakthi
- Oru Katha Parayoo Teacher
- Muthassi Parayatha Katha
- Naranathu Bhranthanum Valmikavum
- Tenaliyile Kochuraman

Short story

- Puthankani
- Nilakkannukal

History

- Naam Changala Potticha Katha
- January 30

Translation

- Oliver Twist
- Huckleberry Finn
- Velichathilekk
- Oru Kuttiyude Athmakatha

Play

- Thyagaseema
- Bahadur Shah
- Shurpanakha
- Manthara
- Akshatham
- Socrates
- Bhagat Singh
- Janani Janmabhumi
- Aa Vaathil Adaykkaruth

== Awards ==
The following are some of the awards received by K. Thayat.

Awards for literature

- 1982: Cherukad Award - Katha Urangunna Vazhiyiloode
- 1997: Kerala Sangeetha Nataka Akademi Award (Drama)
- 2002: Kerala Sahitya Akademi Endowment - Chakravarthiye Urumbu Thinnunnu
- 2006: C. G. Santhakumar Award - Overall contribution
- Kairali Children's Book Trust Award - Nadukanichuram
- Bombay Natakavedi Award - Bahadur Shah
- Abu Dhabi Sakthi Award - Bhagat Singh
- Kerala State Institute of Children's Literature Award - Oliver Twist

Awards for excellence in teaching

- 1975: Kerala State Award for Best Teacher
- 1976: National Award for Best Teacher
