= K. Bhaskaran Nair =

Malayalam language writer

- Born: 25 August 1913; Aranmula, Travancore
- Died: 8 June 1982 (aged 68)
- Occupation(s): scientific writer and literary critic
- Parent(s): Aykkareth Narayanapilla and Karthayani Amma
- Awards: Kerala Sahitya Akademi Award for Literary Criticism

K. Bhaskaran Nair (25 August 1913 – 8 June 1982) was a Malayalam language writer from Kerala, India who writes mainly in the genre of scientific literature. He was also noted as a literary critic, essayist, and educationist. In 1971 he was awarded Kerala Sahitya Akademi Award for Literary Criticism.

== Biography ==
Bhaskaran Nair was born on 25 August 1913, to Aykkareth Narayanapilla who was a surveyor in the revenue department and Karthayani Amma in Idayaranmula village in present-day Aranmula, Pathanamthitta district. His primary education was at Vaikom, his father's place of work. After passing 10th class from Chengannur High School in 1929, he done his higher education in Thiruvananthapuram.

After graduating from Madras with first rank in Zoology, he joined then Travancore University as a research student in zoology. He was Travancore Govt's first research scholarship student who got Rs.30 per month. Later he got a scholarship from the University of Madras. The subject of research was an embryonic transformation of organisms belonging to the genus Crayfish. The thesis was submitted two years later. After that, Travancore University made him a lecturer in the Science College in 1939 at the age of 26. He worked there for five years. He worked as a secretary, professor, principal, and director of education in the research department. He also did post-research in the United States, and also toured at the invitation of the West German government.

After retirement from government service in 168, in 1971, he became the Population Educational Officer of the Family Planning Association. He also served as the ex-officio secretary of the Kerala Sahitya Akademi and a member of the Malayalam Advisory Committee of Sahitya Akademi. Bhaskaran Nair was also the first president of Kerala Sasthra Sahithya Parishad, a popular science movement in Kerala. His works introduced scientific subjects in simple language to common people.

=== Personal life ===
Bhaskaran Nair married Ratnavati of Thottathil veedu house in Kannur.

== Works ==
=== Science books ===
The science books he wrote in Malayalam include parinamam (meaning-evolution), adhunika sasthram (meaning-Modern science), manatthukanni, tharapatham (meaning-galaxy), shasthrathinte gathi (meaning-The course of science), kuttikalkkayulla pranilokam (meaning-Animal world for kids), shasthra deepika (meaning-science light), jeeva sasthravum golavidyayum (biology and astronomy) sasthra padavali (science textbook), minnaminniyude prakasham light, bhoomiyude guruthwakarshanam (earth's Gravity) dooradarshaniyude jatha (the story of the telescope), vardhakyam engane undakunnu (how aging happens) and prakrithi padangal (meaning-Nature lessons). Dr. K. Bhaskaran Nair's last book, published in 1982, the year after his death, Adhunika sasthravum athmanjanavum (Modern Science and Self-Enlightenment) is a collection of thirty essays of moderate length.

=== Essays ===
His essay collection kalayum kalavum (meaning: Art and Time), published in 1946, are art observations. The article Vishadamo prasadamo ( meaning Depression or Joy) is about the poetry of Kumaran Asan and articles like Nadan kalakalum nammude bhaviyum (Folk Arts and Our Future) and Kathakali are about artforms in Kerala. Dhanyavada published in 1951 and Samskaralochana published in 1958 are also essay collection.

=== Travelogues ===
Puthumayulla lokam (meaning-A world of innovation), written in 1966 is a travelogue about America, another travelogue named auf Wiedersehen is about Germany.

=== Literary criticism ===
Published in 1959, the book Daiva neethikku dakshanyamilla (meaning-God's justice has no mercy) is a proper criticism of C. V. Raman Pillai's works. In 1971 he was awarded Kerala Sahitya Akademi Award for Literary Criticism, for his work Upaharam. It contains essays that evaluate some Kerala writers and some non Indian English writers.

=== Other books ===
The book bhaviyude bheeshani (The Threat of Future) is a warning about the dangers of population inflation. Later he became a devotee of Sathya Sai Baba, and wrote two books about him named noottettu rathnangal (One Hundred and Eight Gems) and Sathyasai babayude athbudha karmmanhal (Miraculous Works of Lord Sri Sathya Sai Baba). He also wrote a book named adhunika German kathakal (modern German stories).

== Biographies ==
- Dr.K. Bhaskaran nayarute sahithyaniroopanam (meaning-Dr. K. Bhaskaran Nair's Literary Criticism)

== Awards ==
- Kerala Sahitya Akademi Award for Literary Criticism
