= V. Aravindakshan =

Indian writer and translator

- Born: October 17, 1930; Kodungallor, Cochin Kingdom, British India
- Died: 26 December 2015 (aged 85); Thrissur, Kerala, India
- Occupations: writer, translator, marxist thinker, lecturer, journalist
- Writing career
- Language: Malayalam, English
- Notable awards: Kerala Sahitya Akademi Award for Literary Criticism; Kerala Sahitya Akademi lifetime achievement award

V. Aravindakshan (17 October 1930 – 26 December 2015) was an Indian writer, marxist thinker, lecturer and journalist from Kerala. In 1999, he won the Kerala Sahitya Akademi Award for Literary Criticism. He was the first to translate many Marxist classics into Malayalam. In 2002, Kerala Sahithya Academy honoured him with a lifetime achievement award. In addition to many independent works, Aravindakshan has translated more than twenty literature works into Malayalam.

== Life ==
Aravindakshan was born in Kodungallur in Thrissur district as the son of Narayana Menon and Vellapilil Kunjilakshmiamma. He graduated from Maharaja's College, Ernakulam and became an activist of the Student Federation of India in the college. When the Communist Party was banned, he became a messenger for leaders in hiding. After graduation, he worked for some time in New Age newspaper in Delhi. Aravindakshan also translated and published many stories and novels in the newspaper Mangalodaya. After completing his graduation in English literature, he entered the field of journalism and served as the co-editor of Navajeevan daily from 1958 to 1965 .Then he served as an English teacher at Thrissur St. Thomas College and Kerala Varma College. He served for four years as the jury chairman of the Swati Award instituted by Kerala Government for the best music talent. He has traveled across many parts of Kerala as a translator for the speeches of national leaders like BT Ranadive and Jyoti Basu. Aravindakshan died on 26 December 2015 in Thrissur due to old age related problems.

== Awards and honors ==
- Kerala Sahitya Akademi Award for Literary Criticism 1999 for his work Sahithyam, Samskaram, Samooham
- Kerala Sahitya Akademi Award for Overall Contribution 2002
- Abudhabi Shakthi Award
