= K. Raghunathan =

Indian Writer

K.Raghunathan
- Born: Cheroor, Thrissur district, Kerala
- Occupations: Novelist, short story writer
- Writing career
- Language: Malayalam
- Genres: Novel, short story, essays
- Notable work: Pathira Vankara
- Notable awards: Kerala Sahitya Akademi Award for Novel; Kerala Sahitya Akademi Award for Biography and Autobiography

K.Raghunathan is a Malayalam novelist, journalist and short story writer from Kerala, India. He is best known for his novels Pathiravankara and Ajnathanama. Raghunathan won the Kerala Sahithya Academy award for best novel in 2007 for Pathira Vankara. He also won the Kerala Sahitya Akademi Award for Biography in 2020 for Mukathakandam VKN.

== Early life ==
Raghunathan was born in 1957 Cheroor, Thrissur district, Kerala. After his education he joined Mathrubhumi daily in 1980, from where he started writing seriously.

== Bibliography ==
- Atharu saheb
- Jvarabadhithamaya chila charithra pashchathalangal
- Ellum poovum chandanavum
- P.Krishna Pillaye kadicha pambu
- 2 Bharyamar
- Curiosity
- Bhoomiyute Pokkil
- Columbia
- Raghunathante novellakal
- Sanjay Gandhiyum Hanumanum
- Narakabhoopatam
- Karingoti
- Pakaram
- Bhoomiyute Pokkil
- Shabdayamounam
- Samadhanathinu Vendiyulla Yudhangal
- Ajnathanama

== Awards and recognition ==
- 1998: Edasseri Award - Wikipedia - Samadhanathinnu Vendiyulla Yudhangal
- 2007: Kerala Sahitya Akademi Award for Novel - Pathiravankara
- 2020: Kerala Sahitya Akademi Award for Biography and Autobiography- Mukathakandam VKN
