= Kodungallur =

Kodungallur Cranganore
- Municipality
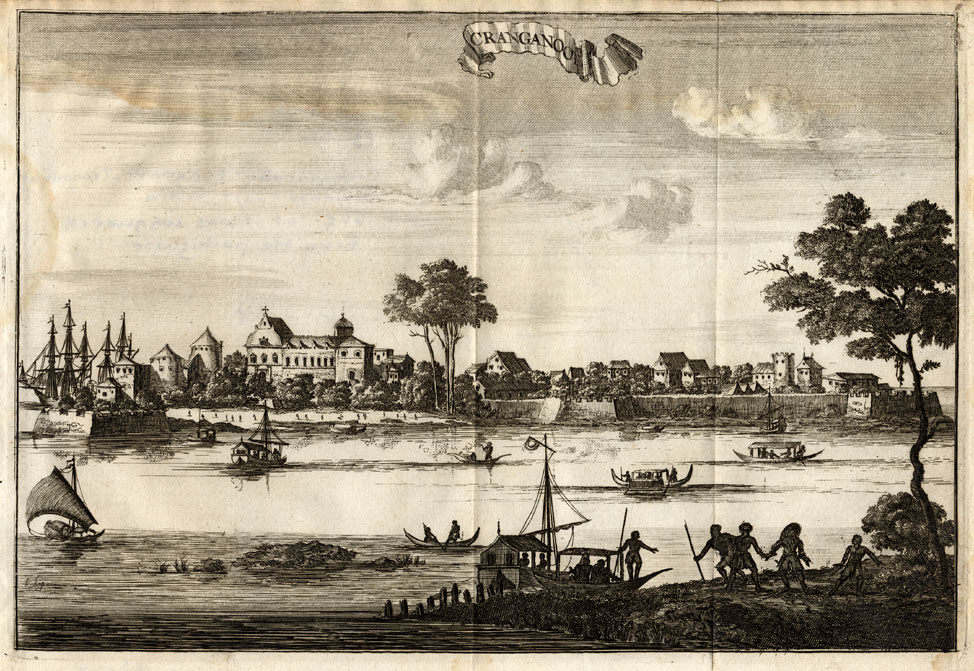
- Dutch East India Company ships in Kodungallur (1708)

- Location within Kerala Location within India
- Coordinates: 10.233761°N 76.194634°E
- Country: India
- State: Kerala
- District: Thrissur

Government
  - Body: Kodungallur Municipality

Area
  - Total: 29.24 km^{2} (11.29 sq mi)
- Elevation: 9 m (30 ft)

Population (2011)
  - Total: 70,868
  - Density: 2,424/km^{2} (6,277/sq mi)

Languages
  - Official: Malayalam, English
- Time zone: UTC+5:30 (IST)
- PIN: 680664
- Telephone code: 0480
- Vehicle registration: KL-47

Kodungallur (Malayalam: [koɖuŋːɐlːuːr]; formerly also known as Cranganore (anglicised name), Cranganor (Portuguese), Mahodayapuram, Shingly, Vanchi, and Muziris/Muchiri/Muyirikkode) is a historically significant town located on the banks of the river Periyar on the Malabar Coast in Thrissur district of Kerala, India. It is 36 kilometres (22 mi) north of Kochi (Cochin) by National Highway 66 and 38 km (24 mi) from Thrissur. Kodungallur, being a port city at the northern end of the Kerala lagoons, was a strategic entry point for the naval fleets to the extensive Kerala backwaters. Kodungallur is recognised as one of the world’s notable early interfaith centres, linked to the arrival of Christian, Muslim, and Jewish communities in India and to early Buddhist presence in South India, in addition to its longstanding Shaiva, Vaishnava and Shakta traditions.

As of the 2011 India Census, Kodungallur Municipality had a population of 33,935. It had an average literacy rate of 95.10%. Around 64% of the population follows Hinduism, 32% Islam, and 4% Christianity. Scheduled Caste (SC) constitutes 7.8%, while Scheduled Tribe (ST) was 0.1% of the total population in Kodungallur.

Kodungallur is the headquarters of the Kodungallur sub-district (tehsil) in Thrissur district. Kodungallur Kerala Legislative Assembly constituency is a part of Chalakudy Lok Sabha Constituency. Kodungallur is well connected to other towns in Kerala through the road network. Aluva Railway Station in Ernakulam district (28 km [17 mi]) is the major railway station near Kodungallur.

Fort Cranganore (Fortaleza São Tomé), known locally as Kottappuram Fort, was constructed in Kodungallur by the Portuguese in 1523. The fort was enlarged in 1565 and passed into the hands of the Dutch in 1663.

Thiruvanchikulam Mahadeva Temple, dedicated to the god Shiva, is one of the major Shiva temples in South India. Siva in the Thiruvanchikulam Temple was the patron deity of the Chera Perumals of Kerala and remains the family deity of the Cochin Royal Family. Kodungallur Bhagavathy Temple is a Hindu temple at Kodungallur dedicated to the goddess Bhadrakali, a form of Mahakali or simply Durga or Aadi Parashakthi worshipped and significantly revered in Kerala. The goddess is known also by the name "Sri Kurumba"" (The Mother of Kodungallur). This temple is the head of 64 Bhadrakali temples in Kerala and is one of the oldest functioning temples in India.

It was here that one of Jesus's disciples, St. Thomas, is traditionally thought to have landed during the 1st century AD to preach Christianity.

== Etymology ==
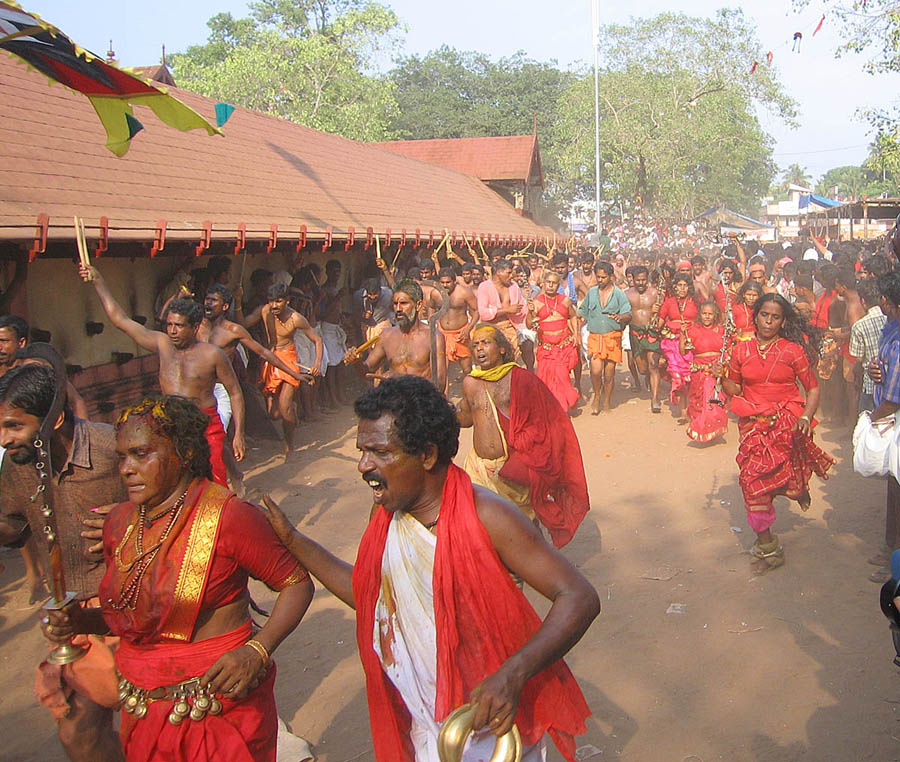
A scene from Kodungallur Bharani festival in Kodungallur Bhagavathy Temple

In the medieval period (from the c. ninth century AD), Kondungallur was part of the city of Makothai Vanchi (Sanskrit: Mahodaya Pura, Malayalam: Mahodaya Puram). It was the seat of imperial Cheras.

Kodungallur was also known as Jangli, Gingaleh, Cyngilin, Shinkali, Chinkli, Jinkali, Shenkala, and Cynkali, which are all derived from the name of the River Changala (or the Chain River, i.e., Shrinkhala in Sanskrit), a tributary of the Periyar.

== History ==
=== Early historic harbour ===
Scholars believe that Muziris, an ancient harbour located on the mouth of Periyar, coincides with modern-day Kodungallur. Central Kerala and western Tamil Nadu in early historic South India were ruled by the Chera line of rulers.

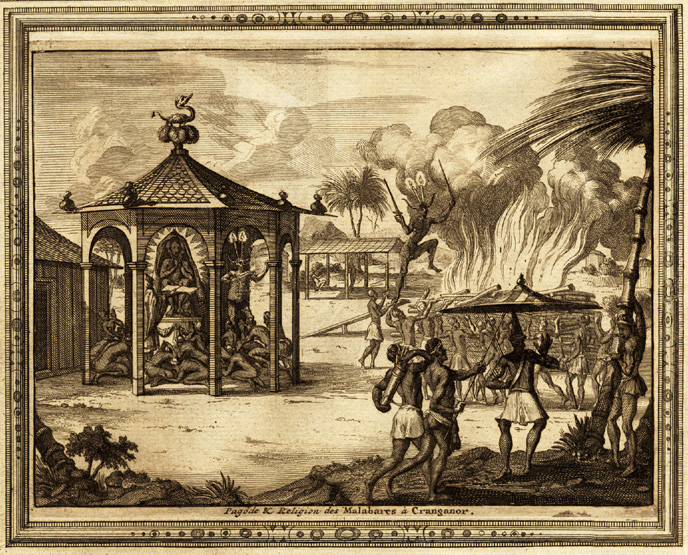
18th-century depiction of the Hindu temple at Kodungallur

The harbour was visited by navigators from all over the world, especially from the Mediterranean world. The Roman Empire had a continuous trading connection with the West Coast of India. Along with spices (black pepper), commodities including pearls, muslin, ivory, diamonds, silk and perfumes were acquired by the sailors from central Kerala.

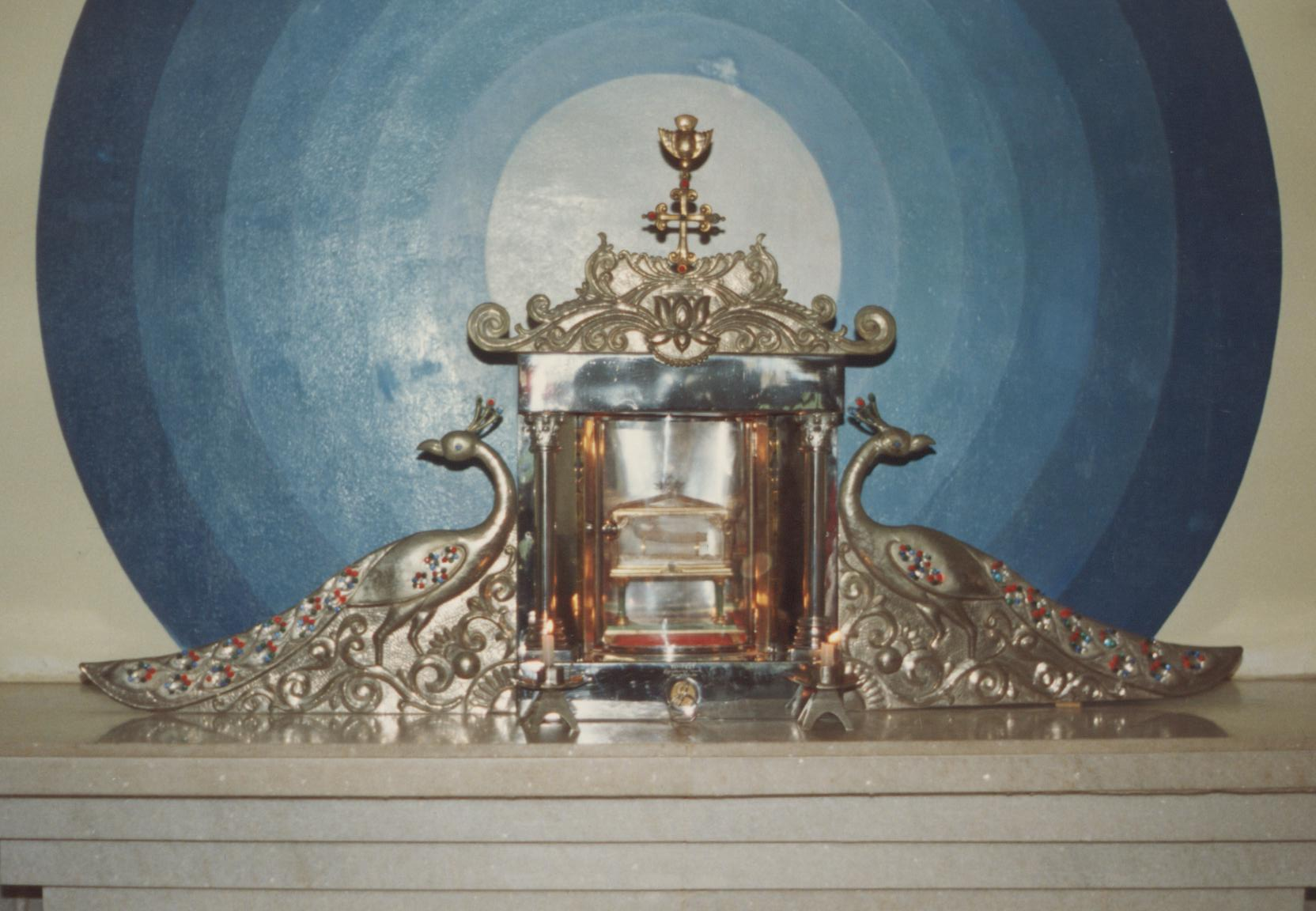
Relic of St. Thomas, kept in the sanatorium of a Syrian Church in Kodungallur

A traditional belief among the Saint Thomas Christians in Kerala is that Thomas the Apostle landed in or around Kodungallur in the middle of the first century CE and founded Seven Churches: Kodungallur, Niranam, Nilackal (Chayal), Kokkamangalam, Kottakkavu, Palayoor and Kollam.

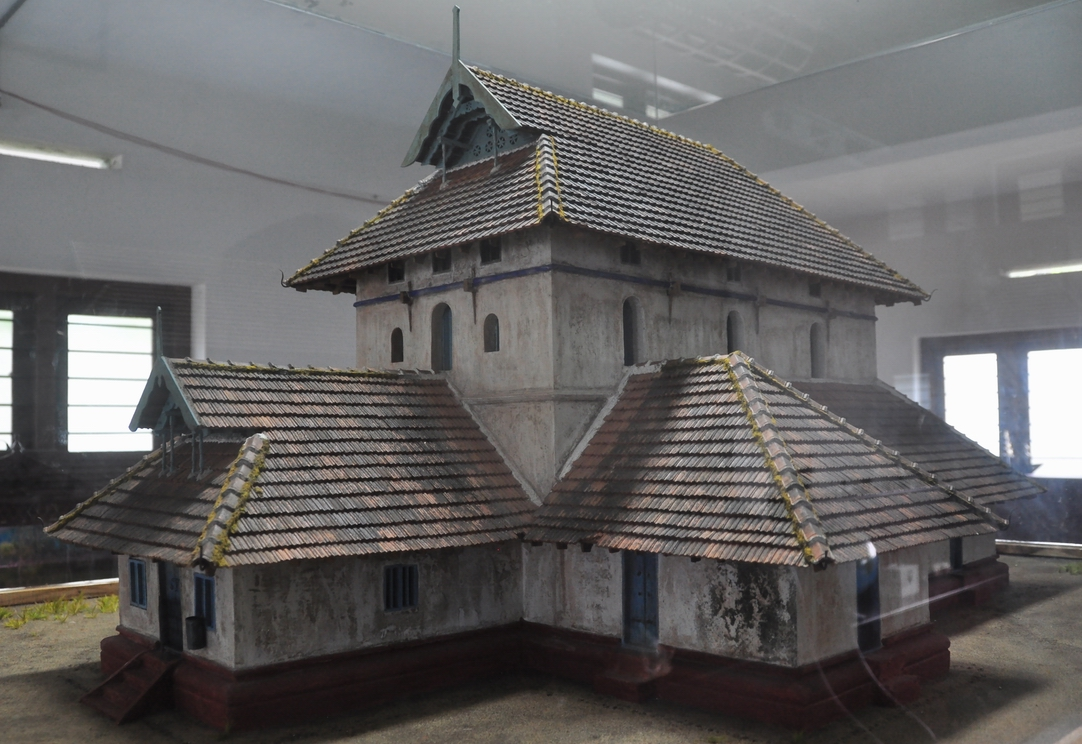
A rebuilt structure of the old Cheraman Juma Masjid

According to Kerala Muslim tradition, Kodungallur was home to the oldest mosque in the Indian subcontinent. According to the Legend of Cheraman Perumals, the first Indian mosque was built in 624 AD at Kodungallur with the mandate of the last the ruler (the Cheraman Perumal) of Chera dynasty, who left from Dharmadom to Mecca and converted to Islam during the lifetime of Muhammad (c. 570–632). According to Qissat Shakarwati Farmad, the Masjids at Kodungallur, Kollam, Madayi, Barkur, Mangalore, Kasaragod, Kannur, Dharmadam, Panthalayini, and Chaliyam, were built during the era of Malik Dinar, and they are among the oldest Masjids in the Indian subcontinent. It is believed that Malik Dinar died at Thalangara in Kasaragod town.

Sometime between the fourth and eighth century, the Knanaya Community is believed to have arrived from the Middle East under the leadership of the Syrian merchant Thomas of Cana. The community settled on the southern side of Cranganore and eventually established three churches in the names of St. Thomas, St. Kuriakose, and St. Mary. The Knanaya left their settlement after its destruction during a battle between the Kingdom of Cochin and Zamorin of Calicut in the 16th century.

According to one tradition, a Cochin Jew colony in the Malabar Coast, probably established before the sixth century BC, attracted the Apostle to this region.

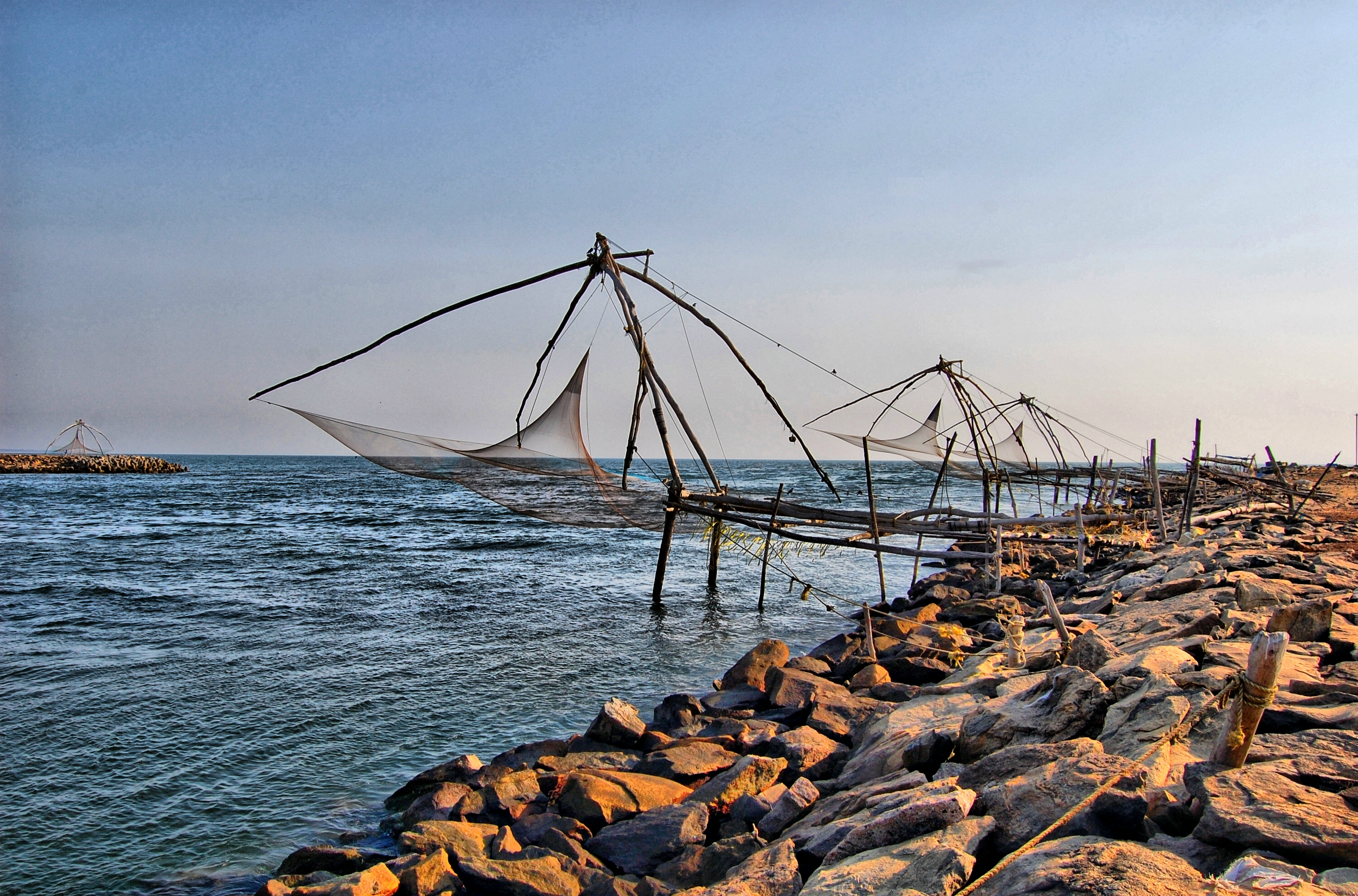
Cape of Kodungallur, where Periyar empties into Arabian Sea. Chinese fishing nets in the beach, believed to be installed by the 14th-century Chinese explorer Zheng He, have also become a popular tourist attraction.

=== Medieval port of Kodungallur ===
The economic and political prestige of the harbour of Kodungallur remained even in medieval South India. Sulaiman, a West Asian visitor to India during this period, recorded the "economic prosperity" of the region. Also, he describes the Chinese traders in the city; they are described as purchasing articles such as spices (pepper and cinnamon), ivory, pearls, cotton fabrics and teak wood.

The port was sacked by the Chola rulers in the 11th century AD. After the dissolution of the Chera Perumal rule (early 12th century AD), Kodungallur emerged as a principality, named Padinjattedathu Swaroopam, under the control of the royal family of Kodungallur Kovilakam. The city-state was "allied" either to the kingdom of Cochin (Kochi) or to Calicut (Kozhikode).

It is postulated that the harbour at Kodungallur was devastated by natural calamities—a flood or an earthquake—in 1341 and consequently lost its commercial/strategic importance thereafter. Consequently, the trade got diverted to other ports of the Malabar Coast, such as Cochin (Kochi) and Calicut (Kozhikode). It is speculated that the floods split the left branch of the River Periyar into two just before the town of Aluva. The flood silted the right branch (known as the River Changala) and the natural harbour at the mouth of the river to make it poorly navigable for large vessels.

=== Portuguese era ===
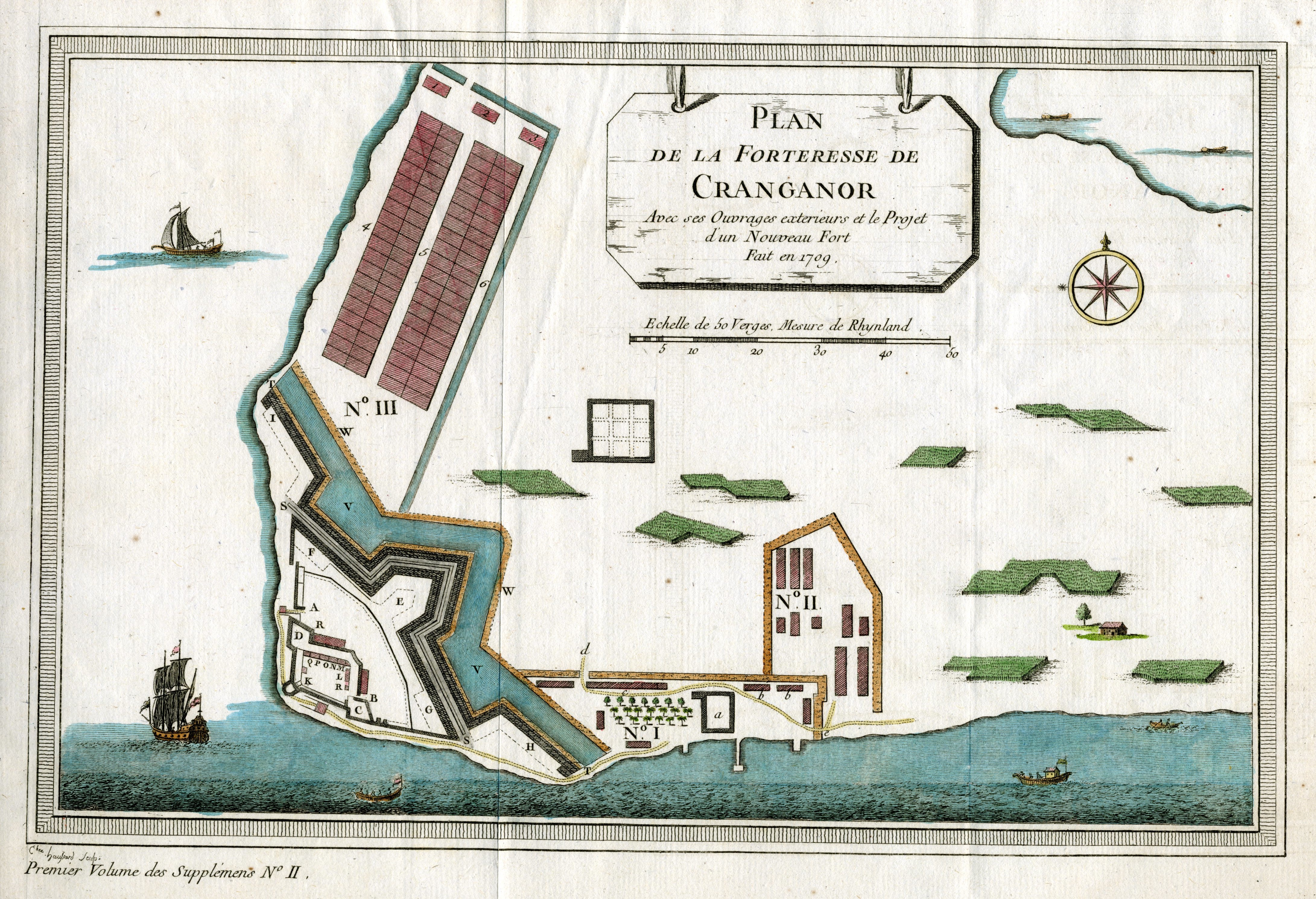
The Portuguese built Cranganore Fort (Portuguese: Fortaleza de São Tomé de Cranganor) in 1523, at the beginning of Portuguese rule, which lasted until 1662.

Portuguese navigators began operating in South India from the early 16th century CE. During this period, Kodungallur was a "tributary state" of the kingdom of Kozhikode (Calicut) of Zamorins (Samoothiris). Since Kodungallur was sandwiched between the kingdom of Kozhikode and the kingdom of Kochi, it was a matter of frequent dispute for both the kings. The chieftain of Kodungallur often switched allegiance from one king to another.

The Portuguese spice trade was challenged by the kings of Kozhikode in the Indian Ocean. The port of Kodungallur had a sizeable Jewish, native Christian, and Muslim population at the time. Portuguese Company extended their aggression on Calicut to allied coastal city-states, including Kodungallur. The port was almost completely destroyed by the Portuguese (Suarez de Menezes) on 1 September 1504.

Kodungallur, being a port city at the northern end of the Vembanad lagoon, was a strategic entry point for Zamorin's army and fleet into the Kerala backwaters. Hence, in October 1504, Zamorin dispatched a force to fortify Kodungallur. Reading this movement as a preparation for a renewed attack on Kochi, the Portuguese commander, Lopo Soares, ordered a preemptive strike. A squadron of around ten fighting ships, accompanied by numerous fighting boats from Kochi, headed up to Kodungallur. The heavier ships, unable to make their way into the shallow channels, anchored at Palliport (Pallipuram, on the outer edge of Vypin island), while the smaller frigates progressed to the destination.

Converging on Kodungallur, the Portuguese-Kochi fleet quickly dispersed the Calicut forces on the beach using cannons, and launched their composite army – some 1,000 Portuguese soldiers and 1,000 soldiers of Kochi – who took on the rest of the enemy force in Kodungallur. The assault troops captured and sacked the city of Kodungallur and set it on fire by the squads led by Duarte Pacheco Pereira and Diogo Fernandes Correa. Nonetheless, according to some records, Portuguese arsonists spared the Saint Thomas Christian quarters in the city. (At the time the community was in a tenuous position: though thriving in the spice trade and protected by their own militia, the local political sphere was volatile, and the Saint Thomas Christians had found themselves under pressure from the rajas of Calicut, Cochin, and other small kingdoms in the area. Hence the community had sought an alliance with the Portuguese newcomers. Since they were one of the major suppliers of pepper in the region, the Portuguese also found the relationship reciprocating.)

==== Calicut fleet ====
The Calicut fleet, some five ships and 80 paraus, that had been dispatched to save the city was intercepted by the idling Portuguese ships near Palliport and defeated in a naval encounter. Meanwhile, the raja of the Kingdom of Tanur (Vettattnad), whose kingdom lay to the north, on the road between Calicut and Kodungallur, and who had a spoiled relation with the Zamorin, offered to place himself under Portuguese suzerainty. It is recorded that the military of Calicut, which was led by Zamorin in person, was defeated on their way to Kodungallur by a sizeable Portuguese army with the assistance of the Tanur ruler.

The raid on Cranganore and the defection of the Tanur raja were serious setbacks to the Zamorin of Calicut, pushing the frontline north and effectively placing the Vembanad lagoon out of the Zamorin's reach. The battle set the scene for the Portuguese to expand their colonial authority over a significant area of the Malabar coast. By 1510, their fluid power in the Malabar coast solidified into a perceptible territorial entity.

In 1662, the Dutch entered the competition, sacked the Portuguese in a fortnightly war with the help of Zamorin, and occupied Kodungallur. The Dutch took control of Kodungallur Fort in 1663, and it eventually protected southern Kerala, especially Travancore, from the Mysorean invasion in 1776. In 1786, Mysorean troops again marched to northern Kerala but failed to progress ahead of Kodungallur. On 31 July 1789, the Dutch handed over their establishments in Kodungallur and Azhikode to the Kingdom of Travancore for 300,000 Surat silver rupees.

== Muziris Heritage Project ==
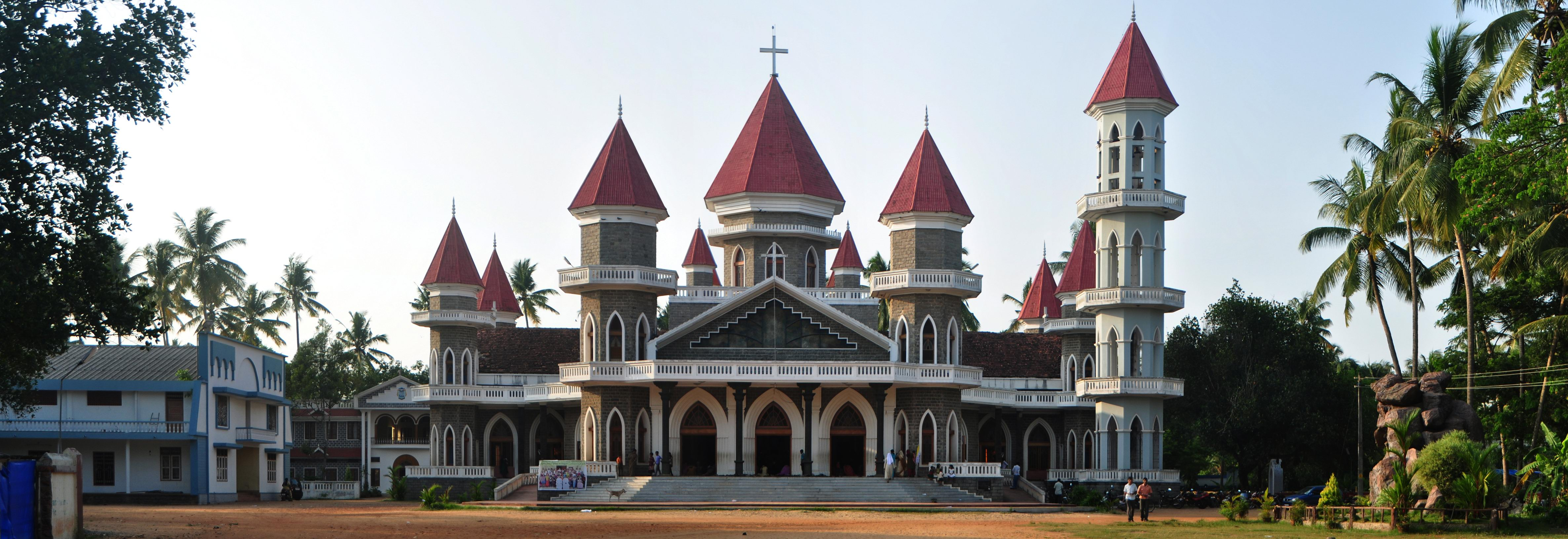
Saint Michael's Cathedral

The Muziris Heritage Project was launched by the Government of Kerala's Department of Cultural Affairs in 2006 to "scientifically retrieve and preserve the historical heritage of the region, extending from North Paravur to Kodungallur". The Kerala Council for Historical Research (KCHR), identified as the nodal agency for the Muziris Heritage Project, provides academic guidance and undertakes archaeological and historical research in the region.

== Notable people ==
- V. T. Aravindaksha Menon (1921–1994), actor
- V. Aravindakshan (1930–2015), writer and thinker
- Bahadoor (1930–2000), actor
- P. Bhaskaran (1924–2007), poet and director
- K. H. Hussain (born 1952), typeface designer
- Kamal (born 1957), director
- Kodungallur Kunjikkuttan Thampuran (1864–1914), poet and scholar
- K. Madhava Menon (1911–1984), painter
- Malavika Menon (born 1998), actress
- Naslen (born 2000), actor
- V. K. Rajan (1940–1997), politician
- Sachy (1972–2020), director and screenwriter
- Sashi Kumar (born 1952), journalist and actor
- K. M. Seethi Sahib (1899–1961), politician
- K. R. Sunil (born 1975), photographer and writer
- Vaishnav Girish (born 2002), singer
- M. N. Vijayan (1930–2007), writer

== See also ==
- Kochi (Cochin)
- Kozhikode (Calicut)
