= B. R. P. Bhaskar =

Indian journalist (1932–2024)

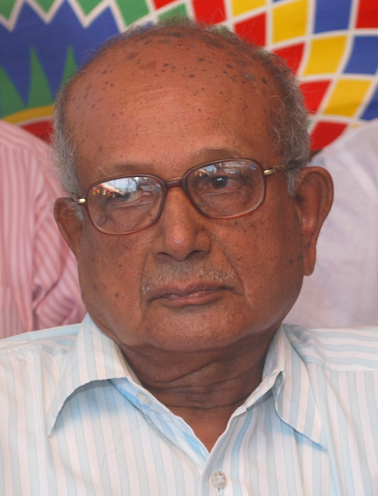

Babu Rajendra Prasad Bhaskar (12 March 1932 – 4 June 2024) was an Indian journalist and human rights-social activist from Kerala.

== Life and career ==
Bhaskar served as editor of many of India's leading national newspapers: Co-Editor of The Hindu in Chennai (1953–1958); Deputy Editor at The Statesman in New Delhi (1959–1963); Co-Editor of Patriot from 1963 to 1965. He also worked in UNI from 1965 to 1983. He was Associate Editor at Deccan Herald in Bangalore from 1984 to 1991. From 1996 to 1997, he served as director and consultant of Andrapradesh Times in Hyderabad.

BRP was a columnist for the Gulf Today newspaper, which is published in Sharjah and he wrote for various newspapers in Malayalam and English. He received the 2022 Kerala Sahitya Akademi Award for Biography and Autobiography for his biography, News Room.

Bhaskar died on 4 June 2024, at the age of 92.
