= S. Saradakkutty =

Indian writer of Malayalam literature

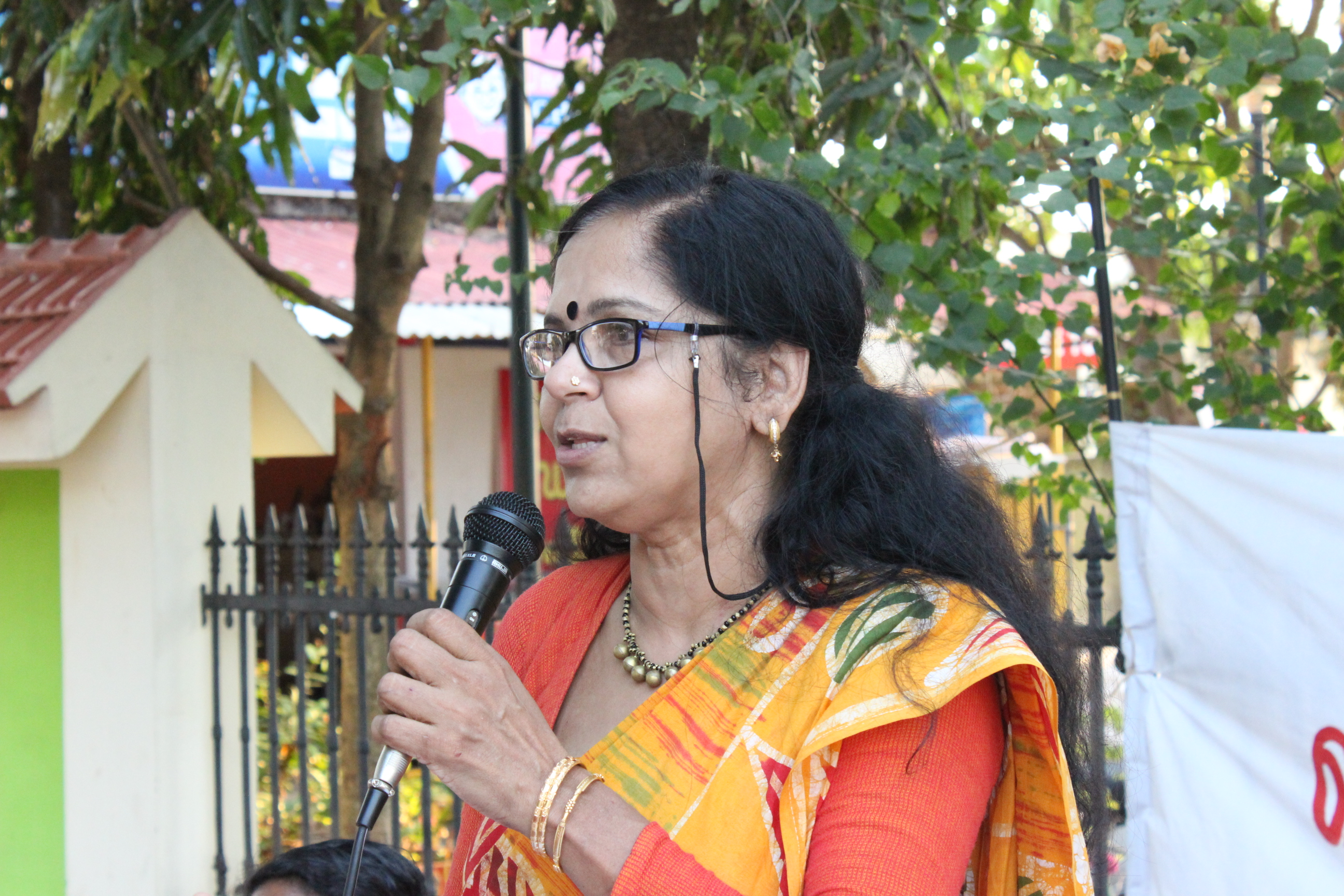
- Saradakkutty in 2015
- Born: S. Saradakkutty; Kottayam, Kerala, India
- Occupations: literary and social critic
- Writing career
- Language: Malayalam
- Notable work: Ethrayethra Preranakal
- Notable awards: Kerala Sahitya Akademi Award for Literary Criticism

S. Saradakutty is an Indian literary and social critic of the Malayalam language. She is the recipient of 2022 Kerala Sahitya Akademi Award for Literary Criticism.

== Biography ==
Saradakkutty was born as the daughter of T. S. Sreedharan Nair and J. Bharatiamma in, Kottayam, Kerala. She has received a doctorate from Mahatma Gandhi University on the subject Buddha Darshanam in Poetry. Her major works include Njan Ningalkkethire Aakashatheyum Bhoomiyeyum Sakshyam Vekkunnu, Pranayathadavukaran, Ethrayethra Preranakal, Penvinimayangal and Pennu Kothiya Vakkukal. Saradakkutty won the Kerala Sahitya Akademi Award for Literary Criticism for the work Ethrayethra Preranakal in 2023.
