= Thrissur Press Club =

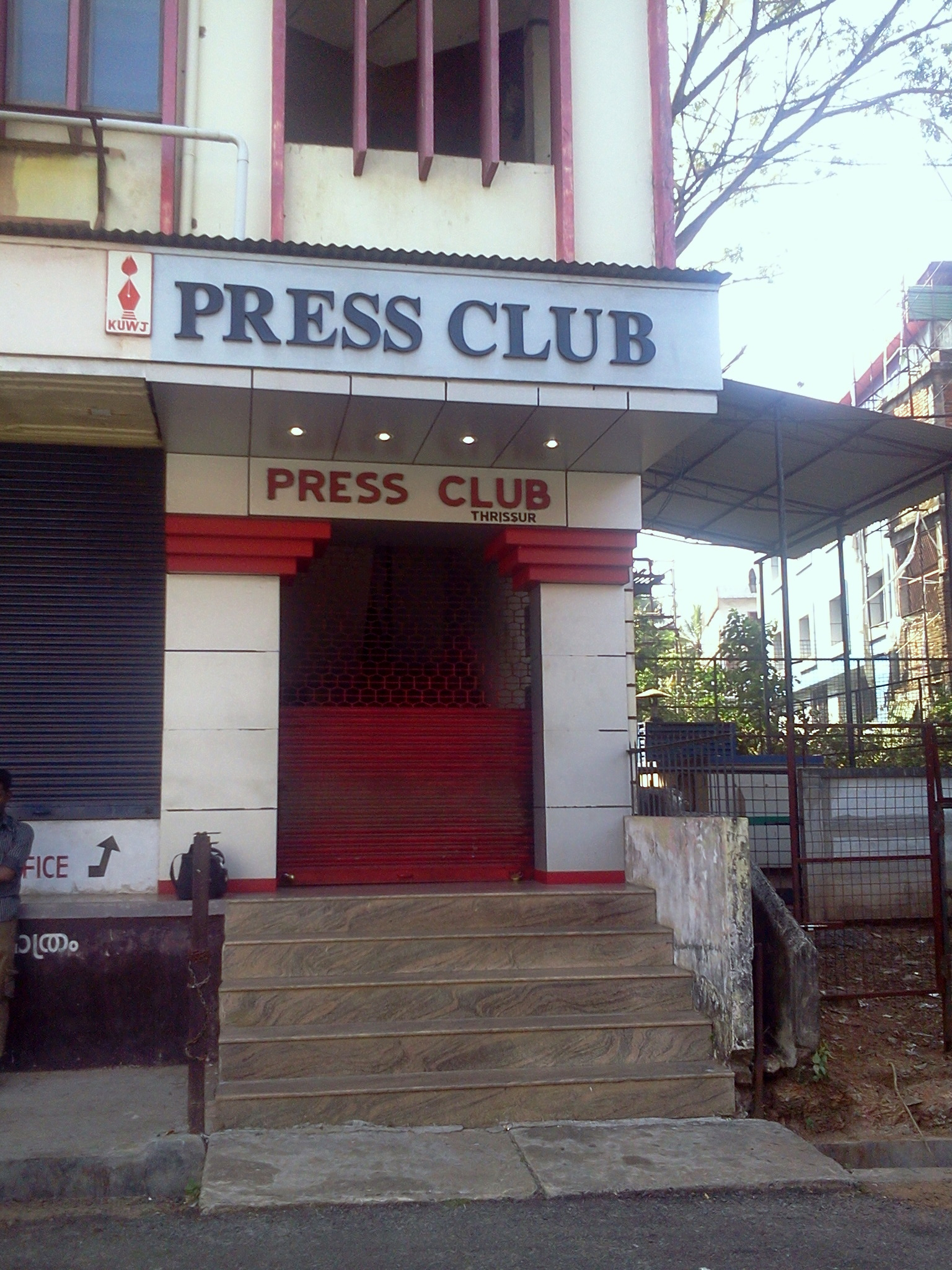
Entrance of Thrissur Press Club

The Thrissur Press Club (TPC) is an association of primarily news journalists and media professionals in the Thrissur City, Kerala, India. It is also the District Unit of Kerala Union of Working Journalist. On October 3rd, 2007, orator M.N. Vijayan expired here.
