= Edward Brennen =

British philanthropist (1784–1859)

- Born: 1784; London, United Kingdom
- Died: 2 October 1859 (aged 74–75); Thalassery, Kerala, India
- Resting place: Thalassery
- Occupation: philanthropist

Edward Brennen (also spelled as Edward Brennan) was a British philanthropist who lived and died in Thalassery, Kerala. Government Brennen College, Thalassery, Government Brennen College of Teacher Education, Thalassery and Govt. Brennen Higher Secondary School, Thalassery are named after him.

== Biography ==
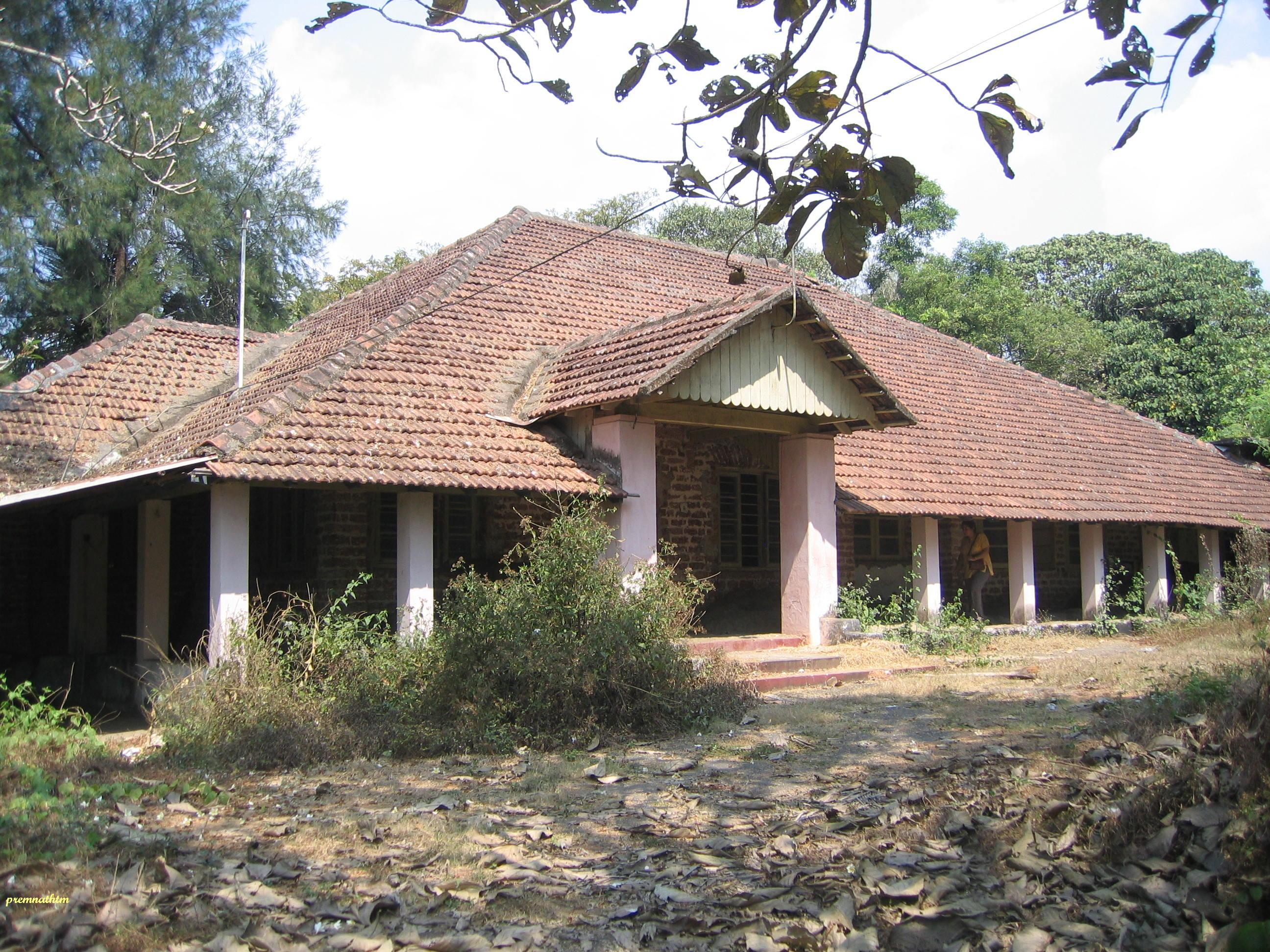
Edward Brennen's Bunglow (Later Sub. collectors' Bunglow) in Thalassery

Born in London in 1784, Brennan joined the East India Company in 1810. He later moved to their subsidiary, Bombay Marine Services. He worked as a cabin boy on a ship. The ship on which he was working crashed during a voyage. Brennan, who was stranded in the sea near Kannur Thalassery, swam to the shores of Thalassery. He then decided to stay in Thalassery. In 1824, Brennan was appointed Master Attendant at the Thalassery Port Office, where he continued for 35 years.

The people of Thalassery affectionately called him Brennan Saip.

Brennan was thought to be unmarried But it was later found that Edward Brennan was married to a woman from Thalassery and had a daughter, whose name was Flora, and she was buried in St. Stephen's Church Cemetery in Ooty at the age of 16.

Brennan died on 2 October 1859. The tomb of Edward Brennan is located near St. John's Church, behind the Thalassery Fort, which was built with a portion of Edward Brennan's livelihood. The tomb inscription reads, "A sterling upright Englishman."

== As a philanthropist ==
In 1846 Brennan formed a trust called the Tellechery Poor Fund with the vision of helping the poor and orphans. His first share was Rs 3,000 which he had in his hand. Eventually his total savings of Rs. 1,50,000 was paid to the trust. Brennan in his will mentioned to set up a 'free school' in the town of Thalassery to provide free education to all. This school later became Thalassery Brennan College.

As mentioned in his will, the free school was founded in 1861 and it was merged with the Basel German Mission School in 1866 and was upgraded to a high school in 1868. In 1871 Basel Mission withdrawn support to the school. The school was converted into a district government school in 1883 and was taken over by the Thalassery Municipality in 1884. The school was then elevated to the status of a II grade college in 1890 and converted into a full-fledged college in 1947. Brennan College and was the first college between Kozhikode and Mangalore that time. The school, which was separated from the college in 1949, was shifted to Chirakkara, but in 1958 the college moved to Dharmadam and the school returned to its old building after the establishment of Brennen College of Teacher Education. The school is the lab school for the student teachers in Government Brennen College of Teacher Education Thalassery.
