= M. Kunjaman =

Indian scholar, social scientist, economist and prominent academician

M. Kunhaman
- Born: c. 1949; Palakkad district, Kerala
- Died: December 3, 2023 (aged 73–74); Sreekaryam
- Education: Centre for Development Studies; Cochin University of Science and Technology
- Occupations: Economist, Scholar, Thinker
- Awards: Kerala Sahitya Akademi Award for Biography and Autobiography

M. Kunhaman (c. 1949 – 3 December 2023) was an Indian economist, social scientist, thinker and academician from Kerala. He was a professor at the Tata Institute of Social Sciences (TISS) campus in Tuljapur, a member of the University Grants Commission, and a long time Economics faculty member at the University of Kerala. Kunhaman was awarded the Kerala Sahitya Akademi award for his biographical work Ethiru in 2021.

== Biography ==
M. Kunhaman was born in Vadanamkurissi in Palakkad in Kerala, India . He received the first rank in MA Economics at Calicut University in 1974.

Kunhaman enrolled in the MPhil programme at the Centre for Development Studies (CDS) in Thiruvananthapuram after receiving his MA in economics. A Fulbright scholar, he started his career in academics as a lecturer at the University of Kerala in 1979. He spent 27 years as a pre-eminent faculty member in the Economics Department. He had been a critical part of the University Grants Commission (UGC). He left the University of Kerala in 2006 to lead TISS.

Kunhaman's autobiography Ethiru was chosen as the best autobiography by the Kerala Sahitya Akademi in 2021. However, Kunhaman turned it down. He described the underprivileged way of life and social disparities in Kerala in his autobiography. Kunhaman was the author of several books and multiple papers on the Kerala economic model, macro economics, and land reforms. His publications include Development of Tribal Economy, State Level Planning in India, Globalization: A Subaltern Perspective, and Economic Development and Social Change.

Kunhaman died at his residence in Sreekaryam on 3 December 2023.

== Awards ==
- 2021 - Kerala Sahitya Akademi Award for Biography and Autobiography, Ethiru
