= C. K. Revathi Amma =

Indian social activist (1891 - 1981)

- Born: 1891; Thalassery, Malabar District, British India
- Died: 1981 (aged 89–90)
- Occupation: Social activist
- Notable work: Sahasra Poornima (autobiography)
- Awards: Kerala Sahitya Akademi Award for Biography and Autobiography (1980)

C. K. Revathi Amma was an Indian activist and Malayalam language writer from Kerala. In 1980, she won the Kerala Sahitya Akademi Award for Biography and Autobiography for her autobiography Sahasra Poornima.

== Biography ==
C. K. Revathi Amma was born into a prominent Thiyya family in Thalassery, Malabar District, (present-day Kannur district of Kerala) in 1891. She was the daughter of Karai Damayanti, who was also a social activist. Her maternal grandfather Karayi Bapu and his brother Karayi Kutty were businessmen who had relations with English companies. She was educated at Thalassery Sacred Heart School.

=== Personal life and death ===
Revathi Amma is married to Paidal, the police commissioner of French colony Mayyazhi (present-day Mahé, India). After marriage she moved to Mayyazhi. Her son K. V. Padmanabhan was Indian ambassador to Thailand and Iran. She died in 1981.

== Activism ==
Revathi Amma was a woman welfare activist. She worked as the president of the Mahila Mandiram, a centre for educating and uplifting economically backward women. After her marriage, Revathi Amma moved to Mayyazhi and led the women's liberation movement there. She started her social activism in Mayyazhi by trying to liberate the women of Mayyazhi. In order to raise funds to help the people injured in warfor the French army, she conducted drama performances by girls in Mayyazhi. She was also worked with the Red Cross Society in Mayyazhi.

Mahathma Gandhi had reached Mayazhi as part of his countrywide tour of the freedom struggle and to receive donations for his Harijan Welfare Fund. At that time, M. K. Menon, a staunch supporter of the Indian National Congress in Mayazhi, requested Revathi Amma to arrange a reception for Gandhiji and to persuade women to donate their jewellery to him. An active supporter of Indian freedom movement, she donated her daughter's chain and a pair of her own bangles to Gandhiji's Harijan Welfare Fund.

During the Thalassery riots, there was a rumor that the Thalassery Saidar Mosque would be attacked. Hearing this, at the Sahasra Poornima launch ceremony, being a Hindu, Revathi Amma sat in front of the mosque and said that the mosque could only be touched by stepping on her dead body. Even though she was well accepted as a social activist, her relatives were against that, and they even mockingly called her 'stray goat of the bazar'.

== Works ==
Revathi Amma's first published novel was Randu Sahodarimaar [Two Sisters]. Her husband, who was a police commissioner, was initially not interested in writing or publishing this novel. She has also wrote many short stories and another novel titled Shobhana. Her autobiography Sahasra Poornima [completing thousands full moons] was published in 1977.

== Awards and honors ==
In 1980, she won the Kerala Sahitya Akademi Award for her autobiography Sahasra Poornima.
