= 2021 Kerala Sahitya Akademi Awards =

2021 Literary award given to Malayalam writers

Kerala Sahitya Akademi Award
- Awarded for: Outstanding books of literary merit
- Date: 27 July 2022
- Location: Trichur
- Country: India
- Presented by: Kerala Sahitya Akademi
- First award: 1958

The 2021 Kerala Sahitya Akademi Award was announced on 27 July 2022. The award has been given annually since 1958, by the Kerala Sahitya Akademi (Kerala Literary Academy), to Malayalam writers for their outstanding books of literary merit.

== Winners ==
Category	Recipient	Work	Image
Poetry	Anwar Ali	Mehaboob Express	
Novel	R. Rajasree	Kalyaniyennum Dakshayaniyennum Peraya Randu Sthreekalude Katha	
Novel	Vinoy Thomas	Puttu	
Story	V. M. Devadas	Vazhi Kandupidikkunnavar	
Drama	Pradeep Mandur	Namukku Jeevitham Parayam	
Literary Criticism	N. Ajayakumar	Vakkile Nerangal	
Biography and Autobiography	T. J. Joseph	Attupokatha Ormakal	
Biography and Autobiography	M. Kunjaman	Ethiru	
Travelogue	Venu	Nagnarum Narabhojikalum	
Humour	Ann Palee	Aa For Annama	
Children's Literature	Raghunath Paleri	Avar Moovarum Oru Mazhavillum	
Scholarly Literature	Dr. Gopakumar Cholayil	Kalavastha Vyathiyanavum Keralavum: Soochanakalum Karanangalum	
Translation	Aymanam John	Kayen (Cain by José Saramago)	
Overall Contributions	K. Jayakumar; Prof. Kadathanattu Narayanan; Janamma Kunjunni; Kaviyoor Rajagopalan; Gita Krishnankutty; K. A. Jayaseelan		K. Jayakumar Gita Krishnankutty
