= K. M. Daniel =

Indian writer

K. M. Daniel (9 May 1920 – 18 July 1988) was an Indian literary critic and scholar from Kerala, India.

== Life ==
He was born in Chengannur. He took his master's degree in Malayalam language from Kerala University in literature and served for forty years as Lecturer and Professor in various colleges. He is the first person from University of Kerala to receive first rank in Malayalam M.A with a second class.

He died on 18 July 1988 at the age of 68.

== Works ==
- Samgha Nadam
- Vimarsanaveedhi
- Kaladarsanam
- Vedaviharapatanangal
- Vimarsanam-Sidhanthavum Prayogavum
- Veenapoovu Kanmnpil
- Navachakravalam Naliniyilum Mattum
