= K. M. Govi =

Indian library scientist (1930–2013

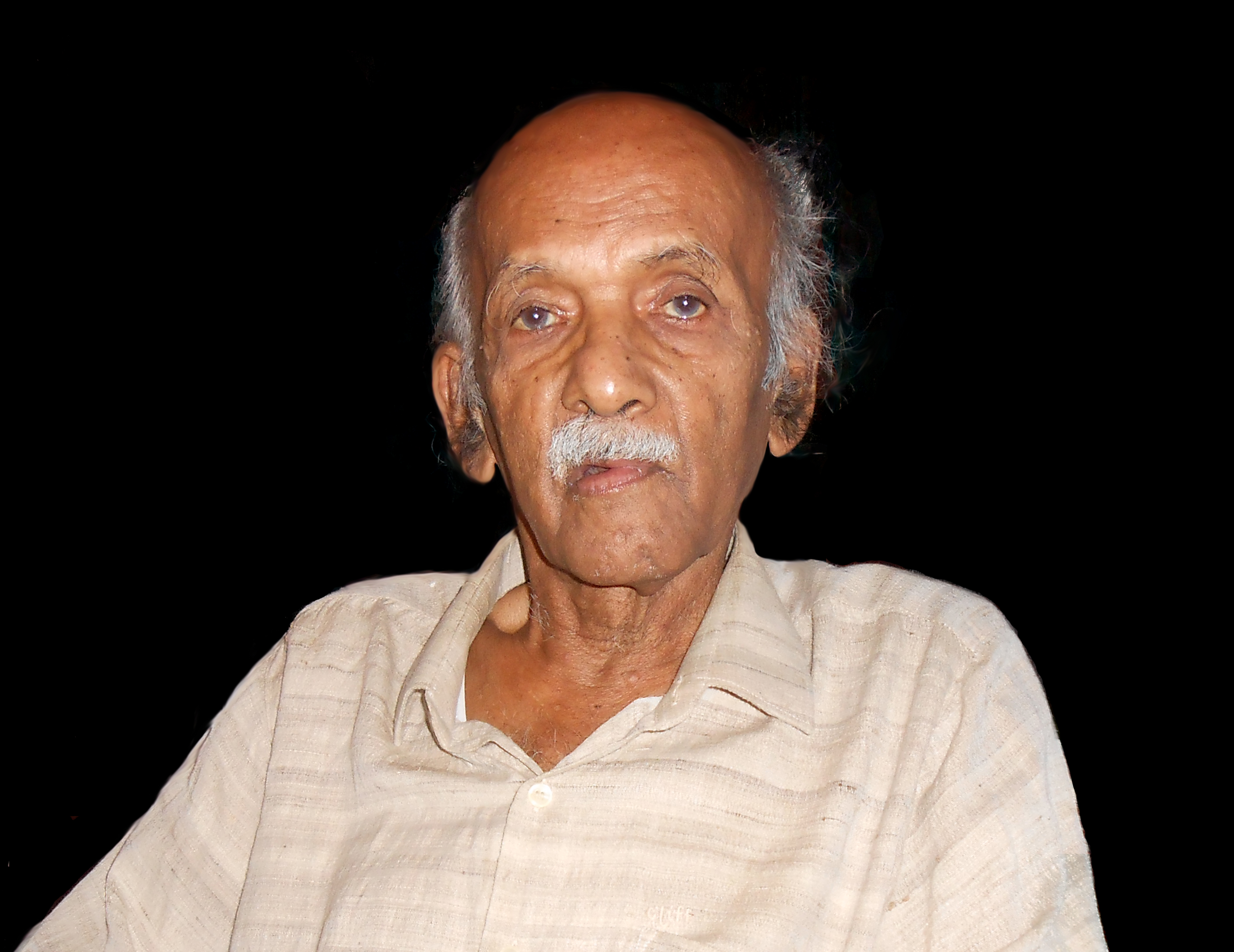
- Born: June 17, 1930; Thalassery, Malabar district, Madras Presidency, British India
- Died: December 4, 2013 (aged 83); Thalassery, Kannur district, Kerala, India
- Occupations: Library scientist, writer, translator
- Spouse: Pushpaveni
- Children: 2
- Relatives: C. K. Sankunni Nair, K. M. Maiyamma
- Writing career
- Notable works: Malayala Granthasoochi; Aadimudranam Malayalamthilum Bharatathilum; Library science
- Notable awards: Kerala Sahitya Akademi Award for Scholarly Literature (1999); Lifetime achievement award of Kerala Sahitya Akademi

K. M. Govi is an Indian library scientist from Kerala. He is the author of the Malayalam bibliography titled Malayala Granthasoochi, the first comprehensive bibliography written in any of the regional Indian languages and Library Science, the first book on library science in Malayalam. He received the Kerala Sahitya Akademi Award for Scholarly Literature and Lifetime achievement award of Kerala Sahitya Akademi.

== Biography ==
K.M. Govi was born on June 17, 1930, at Korapram house in Chetamkunnu, Thalassery to C. K. Sankunni Nair and K. M. Maiyamma.

Govi's father died when he was four and his mother at the age of 13. After his education at B.E.M.P. High School, he graduated in economics from Brennan College, Thalassery. Later, he lived with his relatives in Chennai and became a clerk in the Madras Secretariat. Tired of clerical work he resigned from his job after six months.

That is when Govi came to know about the Library Science course and joined the University of Madras and completed Post Graduate Diploma in Library Science from there in 1952. After his studies, he became a librarian at the Kozhikode District Library from 1952 to 1956. There, he established the Malabar Library Authority and established its branches in places like Payyannur, Manjeri, Ponnani, and Alathur.

Govi joined the National Library in Kolkata in 1956. He met his life partner, Pushpaveni, while working at the National Library. Pushpaveni, the Chief Information Officer there, was a native of Ottappalam. She has a post-graduate degree in Tamil language and literature and has translated Vaikom Muhammed Basheer's Balyakalasakhi into Tamil.

A literary society called Calcutta Sahitya Vedi also functioned in Kolkata under the leadership of Govi. He retired from work in 1987. He returned to Kerala after his wife retired in 1994. They have two children, Gautham, an employee at Infosys, and Amrutha, a teacher in London.

Govi died on December 4, 2013.

== Contributions ==
Govi was considered as an authority on Library Science in the country.

=== First Malayalam bibliography ===
Govi's major contribution is Malayala Granthasoochi, a 10-volume comprehensive bibliography in the Malayalam language. This bibliography is of books published in Malayalam from 1772 to 2000. The preparation of the Malayalam bibliography for the Kerala Sahitya Akademi began in 1970. The search and examination of books was a very laborious and time-consuming task. Vettoor Raman Nair, Syed Mohammed of the academy and V. Karunakaran Nambiar, the editor of Express, were also there to help.

For preparing the bibliography, Govi travelled across India and outside India searching for Malayalam books at different national and special libraries. The libraries he visited include British National Library, India Office Library, Library of Congress, the personal collections of various British Officers who worked in India, Kannimara Public Library, Madras Archives, Travancore Archives, Avittam Thirunal Library, Chitra Thirunal Library etc. Books published in India were considered for the bibliography. It was decided to complete the first volume within the specified time. Based on the assessment that the work might be extended, he decided not to employ permanent staff. The National Library authorities also gave good encouragement to prepare the bibliography.

The first volume, published in 1973, contained books from 1772 to 1970, and was divided into two parts: literature and non-fiction. The second volume contained books from 1970 to 1975. Thereafter, volumes containing information on books from every five years were published until 2000. Malayala Granthasoochi is first bibliography book published in any of the regional Indian languages.

=== Aadimudranam Malayalamthilum Bharatathilum ===
In the introduction to the Malayalam bibliography, Govi briefly recorded the origin and development of Malayalam printing. It was during the preparation of the Malayalam Bibliography that Govi had the idea of writing a book explaining the history of printing in Kerala and India. After retiring from work, he published the book Aadimudranam Malayalamthilum Bharatathilum [meaning: History of printing in Malayalam and India].

=== Other contributions ===
Govi's Library Science is the first book on library science in Malayalam. His other independent works include Catalogue nirmmanam [meaning:Cataloguing], Nammude reference Sahityam [meaning:Our Reference Literature], Pusthakavum vayanayum [meaning: Books and Reading], and Niroopana soochi [meaning: Criticism bibliography]. He has also translated two works, Muthuswamy Dikshitar and Shyama Shastrikal, from English into Malayalam.

== Awards and honors ==
For his book Aadimudranam Malayalamthilum Bharatathilum, Govi received the Kerala Sahitya Akademi Award for Scholarly Literature in 1999. In 2013 he received the Lifetime achievement award of Kerala Sahitya Akademi.
