= V. C. Sreejan =

Indian writer

V. C. Sreejan is a literary critic writing in Malayalam. Born in 1951, he retired in 2007 after working as Reader in English in Government Brennen College, Thalassery. He has published eleven books in Malayalam. In 2003 he was awarded the Kerala Sahithya Akademi's C.B. Kumar Award' for his work Arthantharanyasm.

== Works ==
- Chinthayile Roopakangal, (1991) is a collection of articles on the role of metaphors in philosophy, psychoanalysis and literary theory. It includes two introductory essays on Jacques Derrida.The last two essays discuss novels by O. V. Vijayan and M. T. Vasudevan Nair.
- Pravachakante Maranam, (1993) includes an early piece on the absurd (1972), an essay on Bertolt Brecht's theatre, an introduction to Brecht's Threepenny Novel, a study of Ambikasuthan Mangad's story and an essay on the politics of deconstruction.
- Kathayum Pratyayasastravum,(1993) contains an introduction to Western Marxist literary criticism, and an introduction to structuralism. It includes an essay on the Dhvani theory which argues that Dhvani is the same as metaphor in the broad sense of the term, an essay on the ideological underpinnings of some short stories and essays on T. Padmanabhan and Paul Zacharia.
- Vaakkum Vaakkum, (1996) is devoted to the reading of poems by Vyloppillil Sreedhara Menon, P. Kunhiraman Nair, K. Ayyappa Panicker and Kadammanitta Ramakrishnan. The other works discussed include novels by O. V. Vijayan, V. M. Basheer and short stories by T. Padmanabhan and Zacharia.
- Arthantaranyasam, (1999) discusses the relevance of the classical Indian concepts of Dhvani and Rasa. It begins with an analysis of the theory of metaphor and its relationship with the concepts of Freudian Unconscious and Marxian concept of ideology.It is argued that in their classical form Dhvani and Rasa are not useful in reading modern texts. Rasa is rejected as such, and the Dhvani theory is given a more prosaic interpretation along the lines suggested by Mukulabhatta. Instead of reviving these theories, these are to be destroyed and a new concept can be created out of their ruins.
- Aadhunikotharam: Vimarsanavum Vikalanavum, (1999) is a closely argued response to some Malayalam critics and writers who maintain that Malayalam literature has already entered into its post-modern phase. With reference to the Western writers, it is argued that this claim is not true.
- Vimarsanatmaka Siddhantam, (1999) is an expository book on the work of Frankfurt School.
- Novel Vayanakal, (2003) reads 12 Malayalam novels without using many critical tool borrowed from the west. Part of the text itself is taken as the model for reading and interpreting it. It brings out relays of meanings across the works. It reveals a current of non-religious spirituality running through the works read.
- Prathivadangal, (2004) is a thoroughgoing criticism of Marxian philosophical concepts.
- Arthavadangal, (2006: Mathrubhumi Books, Kozhikode)contains essays on Death, Dhvani theory. Arthavadam, M. P. Paul and William Hudson, Appan Thampuran's Bhutarayar, Venmani Mahan's Pooraprabandham etc.
- Rahukalam, (2007: Sign Books, Thiruvananthapuram) is a collection of essays on Joseph Muliyil's Sukumari, Medieval Malayalam poetry, Asan's Duravastha, N. Prabhakaran's Bhutabhumi, poetry of Rafeeq Ahmed and Miguel de Cervantes's Don Quixote
- Adikkurippukal (2018: Logos Books, Pattambi), a collection of book reviews.

Forthcoming: Chinthayude Mayalokangal (Kairali Books, Kannur)

== Awards ==
Sreejan was awarded the C. B. Kumar Award in 2003, and the Kerala Sahithya Akademi Award for Literary Criticism in 2006, but declined them. He also was awarded the Narendra Prasad Foundation Award for criticism in 2007.
