= Prayar Prabhakaran =

Indian academic and literary critic (1930–2024)

- പ്രയാർ പ്രഭാകരൻ
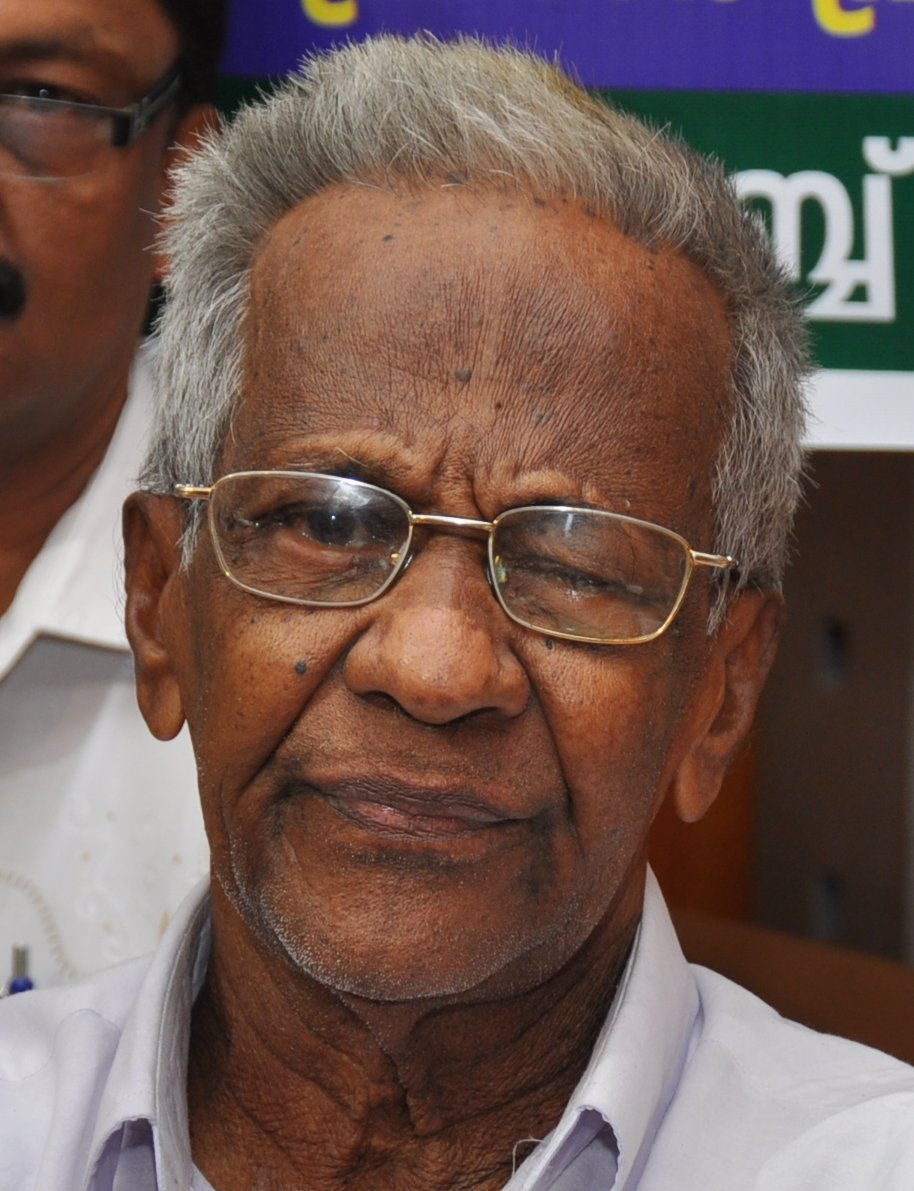
- Born: Prabhakaran; 14 August 1930; Prayar, Travancore, British India
- Died: October 2024 (aged 94)
- Citizenship: India
- Occupation: Writer
- Spouse: L. Vasundhathi
- Children: 4
- Parent(s): Swami Brahmavrathanan, Lakshmikkutty Amma
- Writing career
- Genre: Literary criticism
- Notable awards: Kerala Sahitya Akademi Award for Overall Contributions

Prayar Prabhakaran (14 August 1930 – October 2024) was an Indian literary critic, academic and orator from Kerala. He won several noted awards including Kerala Sahitya Akademi Award for Overall Contributions and the Thayatt Award for Literary Criticism.

== Early life and career ==
Prabhakaran was born on 14 August 1930, at Prayar near Oachira in present-day Kollam district, to Lakshmikutty Amma and Swami Brahmavrathanan an orator, scholar and writer. After passing B.Ed. from the Training College, Thiruvananthapuram, from 1950 to 1963 he worked as Malayalam teacher at Sooranad Government High School, and later joined the University College Thiruvananthapuram for his MA. Soon after completing MA in 1964, he became a lecturer at S. N. Women's College, Kollam, and became a teacher in various colleges under the SN Trust. He retired from S. N. College, Kollam on 31 March 1986, and after retirement he became a teacher at Alappuzha B.Ed. Center.

He had a penchant for communist ideology from a young age. With A. G. P. Namboothiri and Devikulangara A. Bharathan, he formed the Puthuppally Prayar Party Cell. While a member of the CPI (M) Chunakkara local committee, he took part in an agitation and was imprisoned for four days.

Prabhakaran conducted many studies in Indian literature. His first work Bharatheeya Saahithya Saastra Padanangal is a study of Indian literature. He entered the field of critical writing by writing a critical study of Joseph Mundassery's book Natakantham Kavitvam. Communist leader and first chief minister of Kerala, E. M. S. Namboodiripad notes that Prayar's works should be read by both those who agree and those who oppose the Marxian literary approach.

He held several positions including member of the Board of Studies M.A. (Malayalam) of the University of Kerala, member of the Board of Examinations, member of the Faculty of Oriental Studies, member of the Kerala Sahitya Akademi, member of the Kerala Lalithakala Akademi, member of the Senate of the University of Cochin and member of the Thunchan Memorial Governing Council. He was a member of the State Committee of the Purogamana Kala Sahitya Sangham.

== Personal life and death ==
His wife L. Vasundhathi was a headmistress of Mavelikkara Govt Girls High School and former Chunakkara panchayat president. Vasundhati is the daughter of K. K. Panicker, his teacher in his Sahithya visharad studies. The Couple had three children. They lives in their house at Chunakkara, Alappuzha district. The family settled in Chunakkara after his wife was transferred to Chunakkara Government High School.

Prabhakaran died in October 2024, at the age of 94.

== Selected works ==
- Kavi Bharatheeya Sahithya Charitrathil
- Asan Kavithayude hrudaya thalam, study on works of Kumaran Asan
- Anubhoothiyude Anupallavi
- Narayana Guru Abheda Darsanathinte Deeptha Saundaryam, study on works of Narayana Guru
- Bharatheeya Saahithya Saastra Padanangal
- Prathibhayude Prakasa Gopurangal
- Vedangal Athmavidyayude Adimarekha, study on Vedas
- Bharatha Muniyute Natya Sastratthiloode, study on Bharata Muni's Natyasastra
- Saundaryabodhathil Oru Kannikkoythu

== Awards and honours ==
- Kerala Sahitya Akademi Award for Overall Contributions
- Thayatt Award (1998)
- K Prasannan Sahithya puraskaram
- Abudhabi Sakthi Award
- Veenapoovu Satabdi Samman
- Thiruvananthapuram Gurudevan Book Trust Award
- Dr. Sukumar Azhikkodu Vicharavedi Award
