= K. Raghavan Pillai =

Writer and scholar of Kerala, India

K. Raghavan Pillai (1920–1987) was a writer and scholar of Kerala and from Kerala, India.

== Early life ==
He, a well known novelist, was born in November 1920 in Puliyur, near Chengannur in Kottayam district. His parents were N. Sankara and Lakshmy Pillai. After earning a master's degree in Sanskrit, he obtained a PhD from London and worked there from 1948 to 1951 as research assistant. Translator of the philosophical treatise Vakyapadia by Bhartrihari.

Upon returning to Kerala, Pillai worked as a lecturer in Sanskrit at University College, Trivandrum between 1951 and 1955, and then as professor at the Academy of Asian Studies San Francisco from 1956 to 1958. From 1958 he was curator and head of the Manuscripts Library, Trivandrum, until 1966, when he became director of the Oriental Research Institute and Manuscripts Library there. He left that post in 1982.

In 1955 Pillai visited China as a member of a delegation of educational experts, and he was a member of many academic bodies and committees. He died on 25 April 1987.

== Major works ==
- Studies in the Vākyapadīya, for example his book is well known Vakyapadia, 1971
- Ezhuhachan
- Malyalappiravi
- Ente London Jeevitham
- Krithi Oru krishibhoomi
- Sartrinte Asthithwa Darsanam
- Ardhathinte Athirthikal
