= K. A. Francis =

Indian journalist and an Artist (1947–2023)

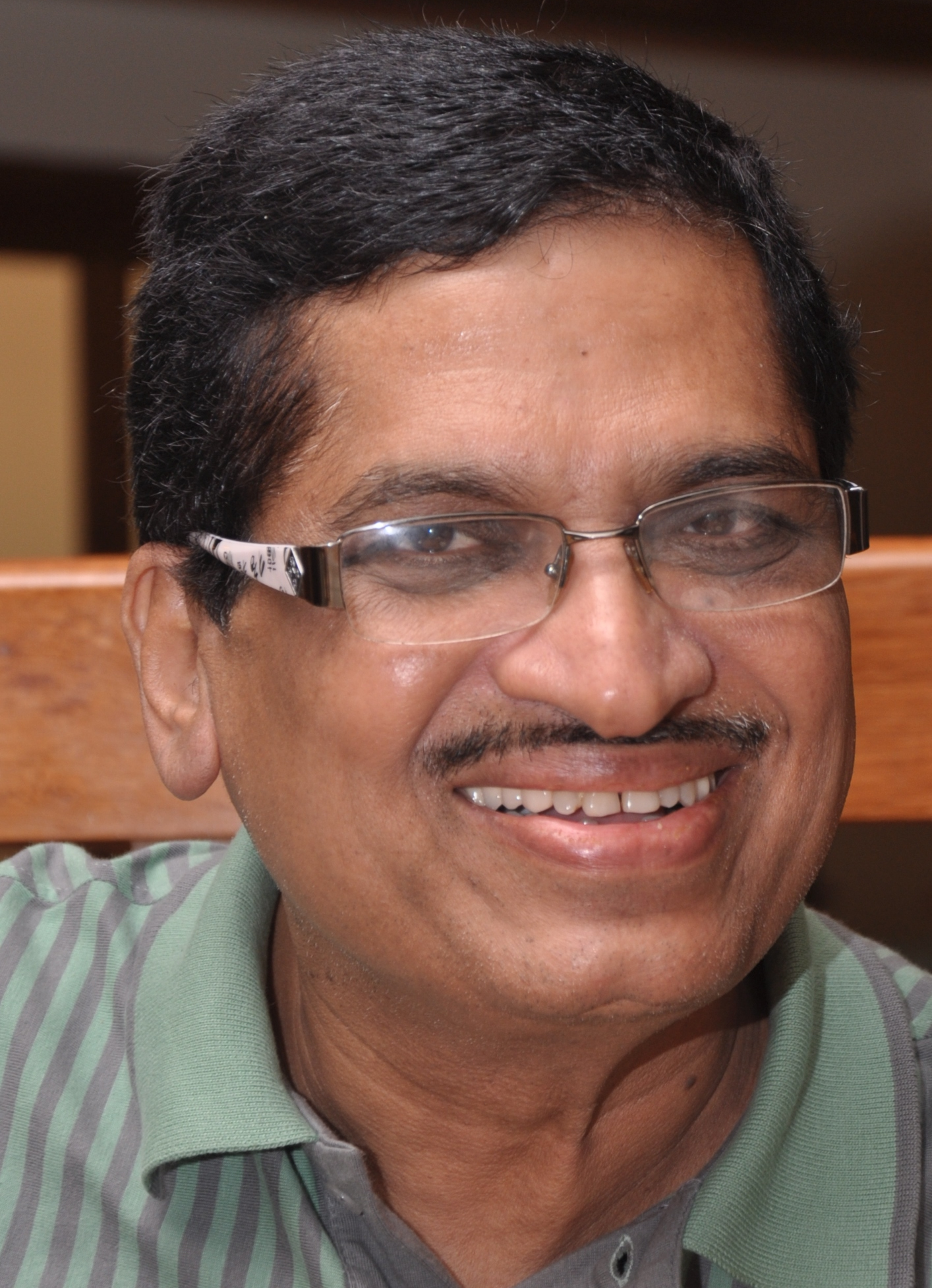

K. A. Francis (1 December 1947 – 9 November 2023) was an Indian Malayali painter and the Chairman of Kerala Lalitakala Academy from 2011.

== Life and career ==
K. A. Francis was born in Kurumbilavil in Kerala's Thrissur district on 1 December 1947. He worked as the editor of Malayala Manorama Weekly, the largest circulated weekly in India. Francis won several awards including the Kerala Lalithkala Academy award for best landscape painting and the National Award for newspaper layout and design. Son of K.P. Antony Master, who established Universal Arts, which introduced Children’s and ‘On the Spot’ painting competitions in the State.

He was president of Chithrakala Parishat. He participated in many tantric painting exhibitions. He had won fellowship and award of the Kerala Lalithakala Akademi.

Francis died in Thrissur on 9 November 2023, at the age of 75.
