= Thayat Sankaran =

Indian writer

- Born: 5 August 1924; Panniyannur, Tellicherry, Malabar, British India
- Died: 23 March 1983 (aged 58); Bombay, India
- Education: Government Brennen College, Tellicherry
- Occupations: Writer, journalist, teacher, politician

Thayat Sankaran (1924 – 1983) was a writer, journalist, literary critic, politician and independence activist from Kerala, India. Born on 5 August 1924 in Panniyannur near Tellicherry, Sankaran started his career as a teacher. He worked at Ganapath High School, Calicut for ten years. Then, he got his MA degree and became a teacher at the university level. He worked with the Indian National Congress and later in Praja Party and Praja Socialist Party before joining the Communist Party of India (Marxist). He was the editor of Viplavam, a left-leaning weekly newspaper published from Calicut. Thayat resigned from Viplavam following his controversial writings on the death of Naxal Varghese. During 1982–85, he was the editor of Deshabhimani Weekly. Thayat boldly expressed his opinions in literature and politics regardless of anyone's opposition. He was associated with the Kerala Granthasala Sangham and Purogamana Kala Sahitya Sangham. He published several books. His work Manasikamaya Adimatham received the Kerala Sahitya Akademi Award for Literary Criticism in 1968. He died on 23 March 1983 at Tata Memorial Hospital, Bombay.

== Selected works ==
- Puthiya Pariprekshyam (പുതിയ പരിപ്രേക്ഷ്യം)
- Anachadanam (അനാച്ഛാദനം)
- Antardarsanam (അന്തർദ്ദർശനം)
- Sitayum Nirupakanmarum (സീതയും നിരൂപകന്മാരും)
- Sahitya Dipti (സാഹിത്യദീപ്തി)
- Chinta Sourabham (ചിന്താസൗരഭം)
- Duravastha: Oru Pathanam (ദുരവസ്ഥ: ഒരു പഠനം)
- Asan: Navothanathinte Kavi (ആശാൻ: നവോത്ഥാനത്തിന്റെ കവി)
- Vallathol: Navayugathinte Kavi (വള്ളത്തോൾ: നവയുഗത്തിന്റെ കവി)
- Jayaprakash Narayanan (ജയപ്രകാശ് നാരായണൻ)
- Parliamentary Janadhipatyam (പാർലമെന്ററി ജനാധിപത്യം)
- Piraviyum Valarchayum (പിറവിയും വളർച്ചയും)
- Bharatiya Navothanathinte Ruparekha (ഭാരതീയ നവോത്ഥാനത്തിന്റെ രൂപരേഖ)
- Indian Vidyabhyasam Nuttantukalilute (ഇന്ത്യൻ വിദ്യാഭ്യാസം നൂറ്റാണ്ടുകളിലൂടെ)
- Manasikamaya Adimatham (മാനസികമായ അടിമത്തം)
