= C. R. Parameswaran =

Malayalam novelist and essayist

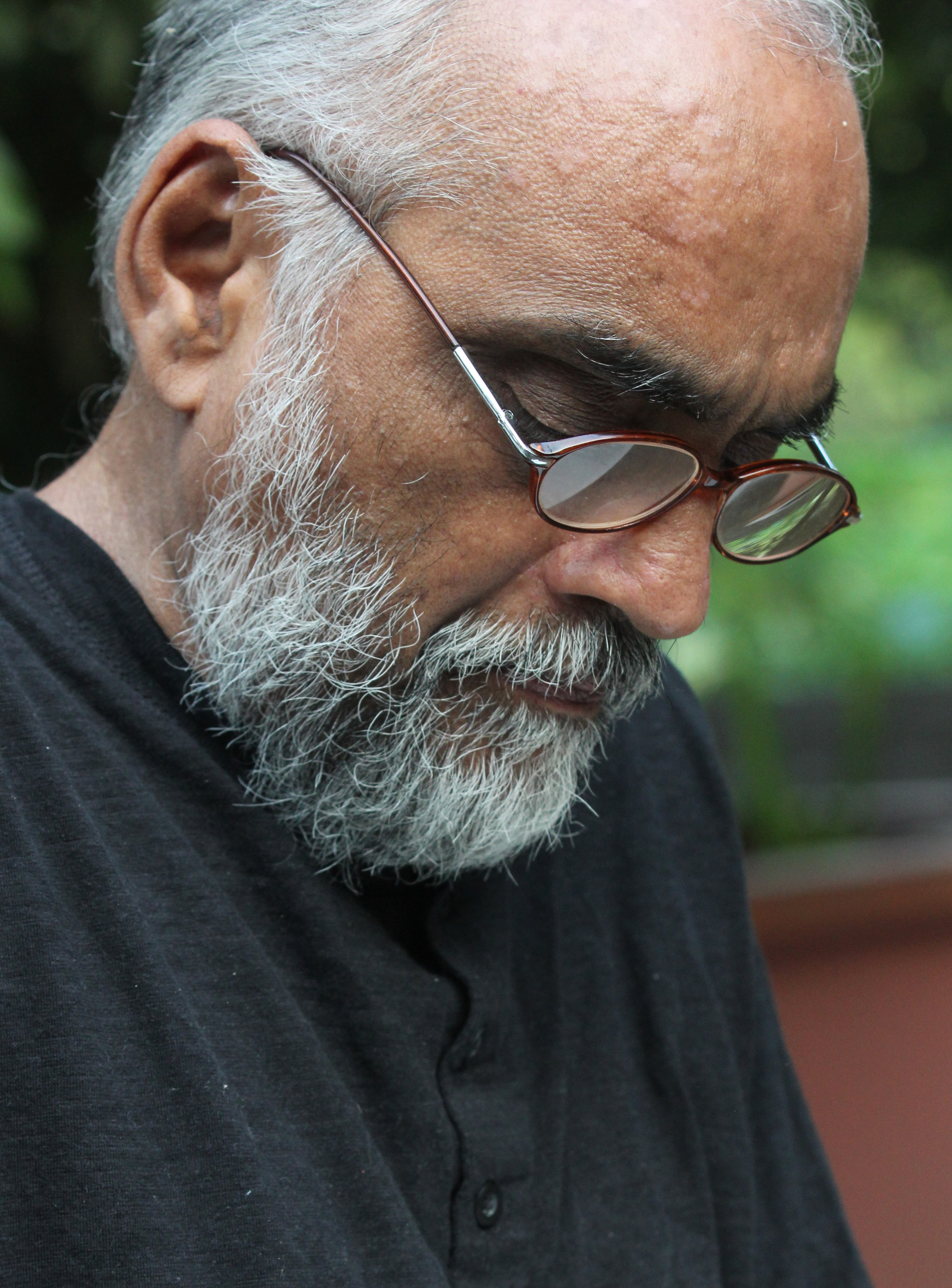
- Born: August 1950 (age 75–76); Chalakudy, Kerala, India
- Occupation: Writer
- Writing career
- Notable awards: Kerala Sahitya Akademi Award

C. R. Parameswaran (born August 1950) is a Malayalam novelist and essayist from Kerala, India.

== Life ==
Parameswaran was born in Meloor, near Chalakudy in August 1950 to KP Raman Nambidi and CK Amminni. He completed his education from Kalady, Irinjalakuda and Agra. He has completed his post-graduate degree in English language and literature. As a teacher at the Indian Air Force, he graduated with a degree in English teaching from the Hyderabad Central Institute of English. He has worked in Delhi, Belgaum, Bangalore and Cochin.

He retired from the Income tax department as a Deputy commissioner.

== Literary activities ==
Parameswaran began writing poems and stories as a university student. He won the first prize in the poetry competitions conducted by Kerala University in 1969 and 1970, and the first prize in a poetry and drama competition conducted by Mathrubhumi in 1971. His first novel initiative Prakriti Niyamam won the Kerala Sahitya Akademi Award for Novel in 1989 and the work Vamsha Chihnangal won the Kerala Sahitya Akademi Award for Literary Criticism in 2015.

== Works ==
- Prakriti Niyamam (പ്രകൃതിനിയമം)
- Vamsha Chihnangal (വംശചിഹ്നങ്ങൾ)
- Mounathinte Shampalam Maranam (മൌനത്തിൻറെ ശമ്പളം മരണം)
- Veruppu Bhakshikkumpol (വെറുപ്പ്‌ ഭക്ഷിക്കുമ്പോൾ)
- Vipal Sandeshangal (വിപൽ സന്ദേശങ്ങൾ)
- Asahishnuthayude Avashyam (അസഹിഷ്‌ണുതയുടെ ആവശ്യം)
- Ningalude Chodyangal (നിങ്ങളുടെ ചോദ്യങ്ങൾ)
- Nammude Avasavyavastha (നമ്മുടെ ആവാസവ്യവസ്ഥ)
- Ente Ezhupathukal (എന്റെ എഴുപതുകൾ)
- Enikku Saakshi Njan (എനിക്കു സാക്ഷി ഞാൻ )
