= Chandrakala S. Kammath =

Indian Malayalam language writer

- Born: 1940 (age 85–86); Alappuzha, Travancore, British India
- Occupation: Writer
- Children: 2
- Writing career
- Notable awards: Kerala Sahitya Akademi Award for Overall Contributions

Chandrakala S. Kammath (also spelled as Chandrakala S. Kamath; born 1940) is a Malayalam-language writer from Kerala, India. She is the author of several novels, including Rugma, which has made into a movie, and Bhiksha and Sapatni, which have been serialised. As part of a forty-year writing career, she published her sixteenth novel Sumangala. In 2014, she was awarded the Kerala Sahitya Akademi Award for Overall Contribution, for her contributions in the field of Malayalam literature.

== Biography ==
Chandrakala was born into the wealthy Gowda Saraswat Brahmin family in Alappuzha in 1940. Konkani is her mother tongue. Her father Sreeramachandra Shenoy was an agent in a private bank. When the bank collapsed, her father became a manager in a timber company in Coimbatore, but soon he lost that job and was unemployed. As the family was gone financially backward, she completed her education with the help of her uncles. After graduation, she got job as a teacher first in a private school and later in a government high school.

Chandrakala married her uncle's son who was working as a National Savings Officer in the Kollam Collectorate. After marriage she gone to Kollam from Alappuzha. They have two children.

After her husband's death, based on her own experiences, Chandrakala wrote an article titled Kungumappottazhinju and sent it to Vanitha magazine. It attracted a lot of readers, and Pisharody, who was the editor of Vanitha at the time, wrote her "You have good linguistic influence, and the writing is also good. you should continue to write stories, novels and articles. Even though not your mother tongue, your Malayalam is better". This was her inspiration to write stories and novels. In an occasion honoring her, Poet Chavara K. S. Pillai said that Chandrakala was a brave and rare writer who fought against customs from the hearth of experience.

Chandrakala has written 16 novels and more than forty short stories. Agnihotram is her first published story. Her novels and short stories were published in Manorajyam, Kunkumam and Vanitha. Chandrakala's first novel Rugma was made into a Malayalam film by P. G. Viswambharan with the same name. Sreekumaran Thampi has serialized her novel Bhiksha under the title Akshayapathram. He also serialized the novel Sapatni.

== Selected works ==
- Rugma (Novel) (in Malayalam). Sahithya Pravarthaka Sahakarana Sangam. 1990. OCLC 26723498.
- Bhiksha (novel)
- Sapatni (novel), 2004 ISBN 8171802125
- Ini Alpam Trimadhuram (novel). CICC Book House. 1991. ISBN 978-81-7174-060-4. OCLC 33273845.
- Sumangala (novel). Saindhava Books. 2013. ISBN 9788195182626. OCLC 858136698.
- Ivide Oru Thanal Maram (novel)
- Agnihothram(novel)
- Kammatt, Candrakkala Es (1991). Mithila (Novel). Si. Ai. Si. Si. Buk Haus. ISBN 978-81-7174-059-8. OCLC 33251935.
- Kammatt, Candrakkala Es (1996). Vanadurgatteruvile Karavakkari (novel). Erṇākuḷaṃ. ISBN 9788171742370. OCLC 37694219.
- Muthassi Ramayanam (it's English translation is published under the titleGrandma's Rāmāyaṇa (ISBN 9781680377590) and Hindi translation under the title Ramayan Ki Kahani Dadi Ki Zubhani), Children's literature

== Awards and honors ==
- Kerala Sahitya Akademi Award for Overall Contributions 2014.
