= Mundoor Sethumadhavan =

Indian Malayalam language writer

- Born: Sethumadhavan; 10 April 1942 (age 84); Mundoor, Palakkad district, British India
- Citizenship: India
- Occupations: teacher, writer
- Spouse: Ambika
- Children: 1
- Parent(s): Govindan Nair, Devaki Amma
- Writing career
- Genres: Short stories, Novel, Children's literature
- Notable awards: Kerala Sahitya Akademi Award for Overall Contributions

Mundoor Sethumadhavan is a Malayalam language novelist and short story writer from Kerala, India. His novel Kaliyugam was made into a Malayalam movie in 1973, directed by K. S. Sethumadhavan. Mundoor has written 5 novels and more than 500 short stories.

In his official career as a teacher, Mundoor has received State Government Award for Best Teacher for the year 1994 and Joseph Mundasseri Award for Best Creative Teacher for the year 1995. In 2015, for outstanding contributions in the field of Malayalam literature, he has been awarded Kerala Sahitya Akademi Award for Overall Contributions.

== Biography ==
Sethumadhavan was born in 1942 April 10 at Mundoor, Palakkad district, to Marath Govindan Nair and Vazhayil Devaki Amma. His primary education was at Parli School, 7 km from his home.

After completing TTC, he first became a teacher at Parali Odannur Government LP School. After graduation and B.Ed., his first appointment as teacher was at Elappully Government LP School. He retired from Kumarapuram Teachers Training College in 1997.

He was always been associated with progressive movements in his life.

Mundoor's first novel Nirangal was published while he was teaching at Mundoor LP School. His novel 'Kaliyugam' was made into a Malayalam movie in 1973, directed by K. S. Sethumadhavan. Mannu published in 1962 was his first story. He has published five novels, and more than 500 stories in 20 collections. The stories Amma Koyyunnu and Mayilpeeli have been included in the school textbooks of the Government of Kerala.

=== Personal life ===
He and his wife Kadapath Ambika have one daughter. They live in their house Akshara in Palakkad city.

== Selected works ==
- Kaliyugam (novel)
- Nirangal (novel)
- Maranagadha (novel)
- Ee janmam
- Anasooyayude swapnangal
- Akasam ethra akaleyanu
- Kettuvo aa nilavili
- Kilimakale paaduka (children's literature)
- Amma koyyunnu ISBN 9788194271475(children's literature)
- Mahayanam ISBN 9780000170156 (novel)
- Katha poya kalam ISBN 9788184234978 (Short story collection)
- Oramavasi divasam sandyakk, ISBN 9788182646131 (Short story collection)
- Karimpanayude pattu, ISBN 9788184232172 (Short story collection)
- Mundoor ISBN 8184231628 (Short story collection)
- Mundoor Sethumadhavante thiranjedutha kathakal (70 Selected Works of Mundoor Sethumadhavan )

== Awards and honors ==
- Kerala Sahitya Akademi Award for Overall Contributions 2015
- State Government Award for Best Teacher, 1994
- The Joseph Mundasseri Award for Best Creative Teacher, 1995.
- K P Kesavamenon smaraka award
