= 2012 Kerala Sahitya Akademi Awards =

Indian literary awards

Kerala Sahitya Akademi Award
- Awarded for: Outstanding books of literary merit
- Date: 11 July 2013
- Location: Thrissur
- Country: India
- Presented by: Kerala Sahitya Akademi
- First award: 1958

The 2012 Kerala Sahitya Akademi Award was announced on 11 July 2013. The award has been given each year since 1958 by the Kerala Sahitya Akademi (Kerala Literary Academy), to a Malayalam writer for a book of outstanding literary merit. The Akademi fellowships and the awards for overall contribution were announced in October 2013.

== Winners ==
| Category | Recipient | Work |
|---|---|---|
| Poetry | S. Joseph | Uppante Kooval Varakkunnu |
| Novel | E. Santhosh Kumar | Andhakaranazhi |
| Story | Satheesh Babu Payyannur | Peramaram |
| Drama | M. N. Vinayakumar | Mariman Kanni |
| Literary criticism | N. K. Ravindran | Pennezhuthunna Jeevitham |
| Autobiography/Biography | S. Jayachandran Nair | Ente Pradakshina Vazhikal |
| Travelogue | Santhosh George Kulangara | Baltic Diary |
| Humour | P. P. Hameed | Oru Nano Kinavu |
| Scholarly literature | Naduvattom Gopalakrishnan | Samskaramudrakal |
| Sree Padmanabhaswamy Award for Children’s literature | N. P. Hafiz Mohamad | Kuttipattalathinte Kerala Paryadanam |
| Translation | Dr. S. Sreenivasan | Marubhoomi (Translation of Désert by J. M. G. Le Clézio) |
| Overall Contribution | K. P. Sankaran; Karur Sasi; G. Priyadarshan; K. M. Govi | |

== Endowments ==
- I. C. Chacko Award: V. K. Hariharanunnithan (Malayala Chinthakal)
- C. B. Kumar Award: M. Mukundan (Adhunikatha Innevide?)
- K.R. Namboodiri Award: V. S. Warrier (Sree Buddhan: Jeevitham Darsanam Matham)
- Kuttipuzha Award: K. E. N. Kunjahammed (Samooham, Sahityam, Samskaram)
- Kanakasree Award: Prakasan Madikkai (Moonnu Kallukalkkidayil)
- Geetha Hiranyan Award: G.R. Indugopan (Rathriyil Autoyil Oru Manushyan)
- G. N. Pillai Award: N. P. Sajeesh (Drisya Desangalude Bhoopadam)

== Fellowships ==
- M. P. Veerendra Kumar
- Paul Zacharia
