= Government Brennen College =

Educational institute in Kerala

Coordinates: 11.7789°N 75.4691°E

Government Brennen College, Thalassery
- Other name: Brennen
- Motto: "Knowledge is Power"
- Type: Public
- Established: 1862; 164 years ago
- Affiliations: Kannur University
- Principal: C. Baburaj
- Location: Thalassery, Kerala, India
- Campus: Urban
- Website: brennencollege.ac.in

Brennen College is an educational institution in Kerala, affiliated to the Kannur University. It is located in Dharmadam, Thalassery of Kerala state, India. The college evolved from a school established by the English philanthropist Edward Brennen, master attendant of the Thalassery Port, who had made Thalassery his home. The college was granted special heritage status by the University Grants Commission in 2016 with an aim of conserving college which is more than 125 years old. In the National Institutional Ranking Framework (NIRF) 2025, Government Brennen College was ranked in the 101–150 band among colleges in India.

== History ==
Government Brennen College developed out of the free school established in 1862 by Edward Brennen, a master attendant of Tellicherry Port. It was elevated to the status of a II Grade College with F.A. Classes in 1890 under the University of Madras. The institution became a first-grade College in 1947, and it was shifted to the new building at Darmadam in 1958.

== Campus ==
The Brennen College campus is situated in Dharmadam Panchayath on a hillock just 5 km north of Thalassery town and 1 km away from Kannur-Thalassery National Highway. The campus has 34.5 acres (140,000 m^{2}) of land housing the academic departments, administrative office, central library, student hostels, staff quarters, and play ground.

== Brennen Library ==
Brennen college has a Central Library with about 21600 books which contained many vary rare and otherwise not available Malayalam books printed during the nineteenth century mainly at Basel Mission Press, Mangalore. The library has prepared an electronic catalogue of these Malayalam publication in 2004. It is the first electronic catalogue in any Indian language with search mechanism in the local script. The library is a unique source for reference for regional studies.

== Departments ==
The college has 21 departments:

- Arts
  - Arabic
  - Economics
  - English
  - Hindi
  - History
  - Islamic History
  - Journalism
  - Malayalam
  - Philosophy
  - Political Science
  - Psychology
  - Sanskrit
  - Urdu
- Science
  - Botany
  - Chemistry
  - Mathematics
  - Physics
  - Statistics
  - Zoology
- Commerce
- Physical Education

== Notable alumni ==
- A. K. Gopalan, Communist veteran leader, Ex-Member of Parliament
- K. M. Govi, Indian library scientist
- Pinarayi Vijayan, Politician, Former Chief Minister of Kerala
- K K Ramachandran Master, Former Minister, Government of Kerala
- K Sudhakaran, former KPCC President and incumbent Member of the Lok Sabha, Kannur
- P. Sathidevi, Ex Parliament Member
- V. Muraleedharan, politician and former Union Minister of State for External Affairs
- Akbar Kakkattil, writer
- A. K. Balan, Former Minister of Law Government of Kerala
- A. K. Premajam, politician and parliamentarian
- V. Unnikrishnan Nair, Poet
- A. N. Shamseer, Honorable Speaker, Kerala Legislative Assembly
- E. Ahamed, Former union minister and longest term served MP in kerala
- James Mathew, Former MLA, politician
- Thayat Sankaran, writer and politician
- K. Thayat, writer
- N. Prabhakaran, writer
- Punathil Kunjabdulla, writer
- Rajan Gurukkal, historian
- Shihabuddin Poythumkadavu, writer
- Vazhakkulangarayil Khalid, former Supreme Court justice and acting Governor of Kashmir
- V. Sivadasan, Member of Parliament (Rajya Sabha)
- V. R. Sudheesh, writer
- Bhavani Devi, sabre fencer
- Vineeth Kumar, Actor

== See also ==
- Educational Institutions in Thalassery
