= Kerala Sahitya Akademi Award for Poetry =

Annual Indian literary award

The Kerala Sahitya Akademi Award for Poetry is an award given every year by the Kerala Sahitya Akademi (Kerala Literary Academy) to a Malayalam poet for writing poetry of literary merit. It is one of the twelve categories of the Kerala Sahitya Akademi Award.

== Awardees ==
Year	Book	Author	Image
1959	Kaliyachan	P. Kunhiraman Nair	
1960	Malanaattil	K. K. Raja	
1961	Vishwadarshanam	G. Sankara Kurup	
1962	Sargasangeetham	Vayalar Ramavarma	
1963	Muthassi	Balamani Amma	
1964	Kayppavallari	Vyloppilli Sreedhara Menon	
1965	Avil Pothi	V. K. Govindan Nair	
1966	Manikyaveena	Vennikkulam Gopala Kurup	
1967	Kathakavithakal	Olappamanna	
1968	Paathira Pookkal	Sugathakumari	
1969	Oru Pidi Nellikka	Edasseri Govindan Nair	
1970	Gandhiyum Godseyum	N. V. Krishna Warrier	
1971	Balidarshanam	Akkitham Achuthan Namboothiri	
1972	Agni Salabhangal	O. N. V. Kurup	
1973	Udyana Soonam	M. P. Appan	
1974	Kottayile Pattu	Punaloor Balan	
1975	Ayyappa Panikerude Krithikal	Ayyappa Paniker	
1976	Vilakku Koluthoo	Pala Narayanan Nair	
1977	Rajapatha	Chemmanam Chacko	
1978	Siprabhatham	Kadavanad Kuttikrishnan	
1979	Bhumigeethangal	Vishnunarayanan Namboothiri	
1980	Decemberile Manjuthullikal	Nalankal Krishna Pillai	
1981	Ottakkambiyulla Thamburu	P. Bhaskaran	
1982	Kadammanittayude Kavithakal	Kadammanitta Ramakrishnan	
1983	Kalikalam	M. N. Paloor	
1984	Aayiram Naavulla Mounam	Yusufali Kechery	
1985	Saptaswaram	G. Kumara Pillai	
1986	Saphalamee Yathra	N. N. Kakkad	
1987	Kunjunni Kavithakal	Kunjunni Mash	
1988	Kilimozhikal	Madhavan Ayyappath	
1989	Ivanekkoodi	K. Satchidanandan	
1990	Pulakkattu Raveendrante Kavithakal	Pulakkattu Raveendran	
1991	Nishagandhi	P. Narayana Kurup	
1992	Narakam Oru Premakavitha Ezhuthunnu	D. Vinayachandran	
1993	Naranath Bhranthan	V. Madhusoodhanan Nair	
1994	Mriga Shikshakan	Vijayalakshmi	
1995	Arkkapoornima	Prabha Varma	
1996	Attoor Ravi Varmayude Kavithakal	Attoor Ravi Varma	
1997	Akshara Vidya	K. V. Ramakrishnan	
1998	K. G. Sankara Pillayude Kavithakal 1969–1996	K. G. Sankara Pillai	
1999	Veyil Thinnunna Pakshi	A. Ayyappan	
2000	Chamatha	Neelamperoor Madhusoodanan Nair	
2001	Balachandran Chullikkadinte Kavithakal	Balachandran Chullikkadu	
2002	Kaanekkaane	P. P. Ramachandran	
2003	Kavitha	R. Ramachandran	
2004	Nellikkal Muraleedharante Kavithakal	Nellikkal Muraleedharan	
2005	Kshanapathram	P. P. Sreedharanunni	
2006	Aalmara	Rafeeq Ahammed	
2007	Cherian K. Cheriante Thiranjedutha Kavithakal	Cherian K. Cherian	
2008	Enniloode	Ezhacherry Ramachandran	
2009	Mudra	N. K. Desam	
2010	Kavitha	Mullanezhi	
2011	Keezhalan	Kureepuzha Sreekumar	
2012	Uppante Kooval Varakkunnu	S. Joseph	
2013	O! Nishada	K R Tony	
2014	Idikkaloori Panampattadi	P. N. Gopikrishnan	
2015	Hemanthathile Pakshi	S. Ramesan	
2016	Ammaye Kulippikkumpol	Savithri Rajeevan	
2017	Mindaprani	Veerankutty	
2018	Budha Pournami	V. M. Girija	
2019	Rathri Pantrandarakku Oru Tharattu	P. Raman	
2019	Kothiyan	M. R. Renukumar	
2020	Taj Mahal	O. P. Suresh	
2021	Mehaboob Express	Anwar Ali	
2022	Kadalasuvidya	N. G. Unnikrishnan	
2023	Theranjedutha Kavithakal	Kalpatta Narayanan	
2024	Muringa Vazha Kariveppu	Anitha Thampi	
