= 2022 Kerala Sahitya Akademi Awards =

2022 Literary award given to Malayalam writers

Kerala Sahitya Akademi Award
- Awarded for: Outstanding books of literary merit
- Date: 30 June 2023
- Location: Trichur
- Country: India
- Presented by: Kerala Sahitya Akademi
- First award: 1958

The 2022 Kerala Sahitya Akademi Awards was announced on 30 June 2023. The award has been given annually since 1958, by the Kerala Sahitya Akademi (Kerala Literary Academy), to Malayalam writers for their outstanding books of literary merit.

== Winners ==
Category	Recipient	Work	Image
Poetry	N. G. Unnikrishnan	Kadalasuvidya	
Novel	V. Shinilal	Sambarkkakranthi	
Story	P. F. Mathews	Muzhakkam	
Drama	Emil Madhavi	Kumaru	
Literary Criticism	S. Saradakkutty	Ethrayethra Preranakal	
Biography and Autobiography	B. R. P. Bhaskar	Newsroom	
Travelogue	Haritha Savithri	Murivettavarute Pathakal	
Travelogue	C. Anoop	Dakshinafrican Yathral	
Humour	Jayant Kamicheril	Oru Kumarakamkarante Kuruthamketta Likhithangal	
Children's Literature	K. Sreekumar	Chakkaramampazham	
Scholarly Literature	C. M. Muraleedharan	Bhashasoothranam: Porulum Vazhikalum	
Scholarly Literature	K. Sethuraman	Malayali: Oru Janithaka Vayana	
Translation	V. Ravikumar		
Overall Contributions	John Samuel; K. P. Sudheera; Rathi Saksena; P. K. Sukumaran; Sreekrishnapuram Krishnan Kutty; Pallippuram Murali		
