= Chempil Arayan =

Koli admiral of Travancore navy

Valiya Arayan Chempil Arayan Chief of Chempu
- Native name: चेम्पिल आर्यन
- Nickname: Chempil Koli
- Born: Chempil Arayan; Chempu, Vaikom, Kottayam district, Travancore kingdom
- Died: 1809 British India
- Allegiance: Travancore kingdom
- Branch: Travancore navy
- Rank: Admiral
- Conflicts: Travancore rebellion

The Chempil Thailamparambil Anantha Padmanabhan Valiya Arayan Kankumaran (died 1809), known as Chempil Arayan, was the Admiral of the Travancore Navy in the service of Avittam Thirunal Balarama Varma, King of Travancore. He was born at Chempu, near Vaikom, in Kottayam, Kerala, India. He belongs to the Koli caste of Kerala. Chempil Arayan is recognized as first freedom fighter of South India.

Chempil Arayan was involved in the Travancore War under the command of Velu Thampi Dalawa in 1809; among other things he led an attack on Bolghatty Palace, the residence of the then Company Resident, Colin Macaulay. The Resident escaped narrowly with his life, eluding the attackers through a tunnel and fleeing in a small boat. The Arayan was later captured, and freed after the payment of a ransom; he died in battle against the forces of the company.

Chempil Arayan was well known for his naval exploits using the traditional Kerala boat known as the "Odi Vallam". Chempil Arayan's Nalukettu (Ancestral home) known as Thailamparampil House is in Chempu, Vaikom. The family members have preserved the Nalukettu and all the old artefacts used by Mr. Arayan including his sword and stone statue. Chempil Arayan's tomb is situated next to his ancestral home.
