= Kadavanad Kuttikrishnan =

Indian Malayalam-language poet and journalist

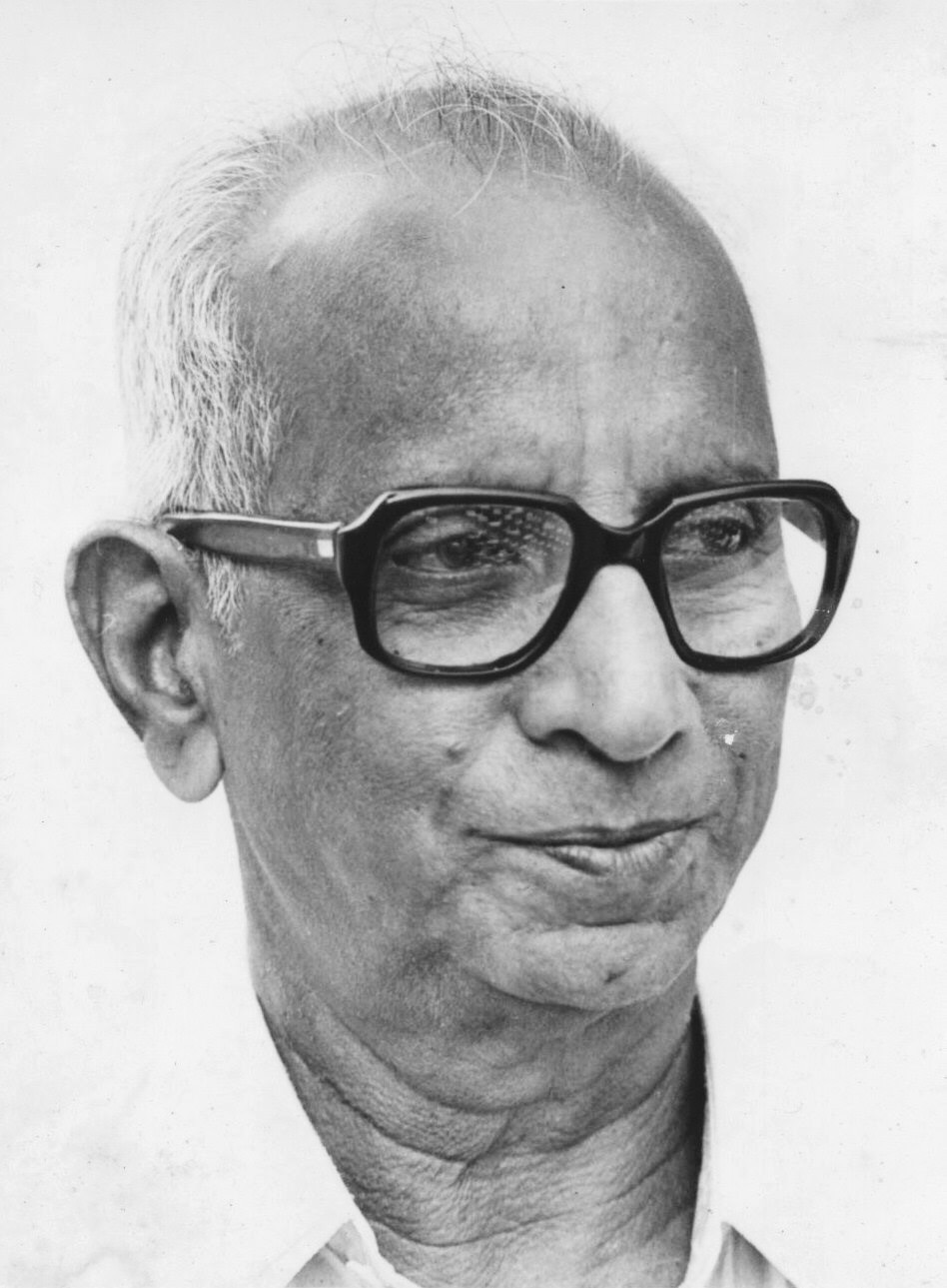
- Kadavanad Kuttikrishnan
- Born: 10 October 1925; Kadavanad, Ponnani, Kerala, India
- Died: 19 August 1992 (aged 66); Kozhikode, Kerala, India
- Occupations: Poet; Journalist
- Notable work: Suprabhāthaṁ; Kalimuttam; Vazhimuthu
- Awards: 1978: Kerala Sahitya Akademi Award for Poetry; 1986: Odakkuzhal Award; 1990: Changapuzha Award

Kadavanad Kuttikrishnan (10 October 1925 – 19 August 1992) was a renowned 20th-century Malayalam-language poet, senior journalist, and a pivotal cultural organizer from Kerala, South India. His career was defined by a dual identity as both a respected literary figure and a distinguished editor for Kerala's most prominent newspapers. As a poet, he received the prestigious Kerala Sahitya Akademi Award for Poetry in 1978 for his collection Suprabhāthaṁ (Suprabhatham). He also received the Odakkuzhal Award for Kalimuttam in 1986 and the Changapuzha Award for Vazhimuthu in 1990.

Beyond his creative work, Kuttikrishnan was an important figure in the formative mid-century literary movement known as the "Ponnani Kalari." He was a key associate and contemporary of Malayalam literary giants such as Edasseri Govindan Nair, P.C. Kuttikrishnan (Uroob), and Akkitham Achuthan Namboothiri. His long career in journalism, holding senior editorial positions at Mathrubhumi and Malayala Manorama, provided him with a unique platform to influence cultural discourse. His legacy is actively preserved through his foundational administrative role in the Edasseri Smaraka Samithi (Edasseri Memorial Committee) and through posthumous honors, including the 'Kadavanad Smrithi Poetry Award' established in his memory.

== Early life and formative years ==
Kuttikrishnan was born on 10 October 1925 in the village of Kadavanad, a coastal hamlet near the historic cultural and trade center of Ponnani in the Malabar region of Kerala. His parents were Arumukhan and Devaki and wife Yashodha. His formal education was completed entirely within the Ponnani locality. He attended Puthuponnani Mappila Elementary School, Ponnani BEM School, and A.V. Highschool, Ponnani. After completing his education, he moved to the nearby city of Kozhikode (Calicut), where he worked in the Grain Purchasing Office and later at Premier Hosiery Works.

== A distinguished career in Malayalam journalism ==
Kadavanad Kuttikrishnan's professional life was anchored in a long and influential career in Malayalam journalism. He began his career in the press of post-Independence Kozhikode, working for the Pourasakthi and Janavani newspapers. He was later appointed as an assistant editor at the Hind newspaper, also published from Kozhikode.

His career culminated in long-term tenures at two of Kerala's most prestigious media institutions: Mathrubhumi and Malayala Manorama. He retired from Malayala Manorama in 1983 as a senior assistant editor. After retiring, he also had a brief stint as the manager of the newly opened Palakkad unit of Malayala Manorama.

His journalistic and literary lives were symbiotic. After his formal retirement, he immediately accepted a position as a member of the editorial committee of Bhashaposhini, a highly respected literary magazine published by the Malayala Manorama group.

== Role in the Ponnani literary renaissance ==
Kuttikrishnan's most enduring impact was as a core participant and catalyst of the 20th-century Ponnani literary renaissance. He was an important figure in the "Ponnani Kalari," an informal but highly influential literary circle that flourished from the 1930s to the 1950s.

=== The Ponnani Kalari ===
The "Ponnani Kalari" was not a formal institution but a "school of literature" defined by its intellectual ferment. The group, consisting of poets, writers, and social reformers, met for passionate debates on literature, philosophy, and politics. Their meeting places were informal, such as the Krishna Panicker Reading Room or the sandy banks of the Bharathapuzha river.

Kuttikrishnan was an integral member of this group, whose other core figures included:

- Edasseri Govindan Nair (Poet and Playwright)
- P.C. Kuttikrishnan (Uroob) (Novelist and Short-Story Writer)
- Akkitham Achuthan Namboothiri (Poet)
- V. T. Bhattathiripad (Social Reformer and Dramatist)
- Kuttikrishna Marar (Literary Critic)
- N. Damodaran

=== Literary connections and mentor ===
As a professional journalist, Kuttikrishnan served as a vital link between the wider world and the Ponnani circle. The historian M. G. S. Narayanan, who joined the group as a young man, credits his "exposure to contemporary politics and literary trends" to his contact with Kuttikrishnan, Edasseri, Uroob, and Akkitham.

Kuttikrishnan's connection to this group is captured in his memoir-essay, "അറുപതു തികയുന്ന ഇടശ്ശേരി" (Aṟupatu Thikayunna Iṭaśśēri / Edasseri at Sixty). The article provides a first-hand account of the "Kalari's" activities, describing their impassioned debates and shared admiration for Edasseri's poetic philosophy—one "rooted in the earth" and focused on "human life" and "human stories."

For many years, he served as "Kuttettan" in the Bala Pankti (children's section) of Mathrubhumi Weekly, becoming a major source of inspiration for young readers. For two decades, he was also "Sankarachettan" for the Akhila Kerala Balajanasakhyam of Malayala Manorama, where he regularly interacted with children and conducted cultural programs and camps. He also served as the editor of the children's magazine Balarama for an extended period.

=== The Ponnani Kendra Kala Samithi ===
As this informal circle grew, it gave rise to a more structured socio-cultural union. This organization was first established as the Malabar Kala Samithi in 1948, becoming the Ponnani Kendra Kala Samithi in 1949, and was highly active in promoting amateur drama. Kuttikrishnan, along with V.T. Bhattathiripad, Edasseri, and Uroob, was a guiding associate and "patron" of this cultural union.

=== Role as preserver: The Edasseri Smaraka Samithi ===
Following the death of his mentor Edasseri Govindan Nair in 1974, a committee was formed to preserve his legacy. Kuttikrishnan was a key personality in this initiative. When the Edasseri Smaraka Samithi (Edasseri Memorial Committee) was formally registered on 30 October 1979, V. T. Bhattathiripad was named its first president, and Kadavanad Kuttikrishnan was appointed its first secretary. In this active administrative role, Kuttikrishnan undertook the vital work of literary stewardship, cementing the legacy of his mentor and the Ponnani movement.

== Literary style ==
Kuttikrishnan's artistic philosophy is situated within the "Ponnani School." This movement served as a crucial bridge between the waning phase of Malayalam Romanticism and the advent of Modernism. Its key figures were defined by a progressive, humanist, and socially-aware sensibility. Edasseri was a "harbinger of the 'modern'"; Uroob was a "progressive writer" and "humanist"; and Akkitham's 1952 poem Irupatham Nootandile Ithihasam (Epic of the Twentieth Century) was a landmark of new, conscientious poetry. Kuttikrishnan's own writings, particularly his essay on Edasseri, champion a poetics focused on "human stories" and "life rooted in the earth," as opposed to more ethereal or ornamental forms.

== Bibliography ==
Comprehensive list compiled from library catalogs and other sources is as follows:

Published works of Kadavanad Kuttikrishnan
Title (Malayalam script)	Title (ISO 15919 transliteration)	Year	Genre / notes
വയനാടിന്റെ ഓമന	Vayanāḍinṟe Ōmana	1962	Novel
വെട്ടും കിളയും ചെന്ന മൺ	Vettum Kiḷayuṁ Chenna Maṇṇu	1963 / 1968	Poetry collection
അറുപതു തികയുന്ന ഇടശ്ശേരി	Aṟupatu Thikayunna Iṭaśśēri	1966	Essay / memoir
കാഴ്ച	Kazhcha	1975	Poetry collection
സുപ്രഭാതം	Suprabhāthaṁ	1977	Poetry collection (winner, 1978 Kerala Sahitya Akademi Award)
നാദ നൈവേദ്യം	Naadha Naivēdyaṁ	1979	Poetry collection
വേദനയുടേ തോറ്റം	Vēdanayuḍe Thōṭṭaṁ	1981	Poetry collection
കളിമുറ്റം	Kaḷimuttaṁ	1985	Poetry collection (winner, 1986 Odakuzhal Award)
നമ്മുടെ പ്രിയപ്പെട്ട അക്കിത്തം	Nammuḍe Priyappeṭṭa Akkitham	1986	Criticism / essay
വഴിമുത്ത്	Vazhimuthu	1988	Poetry collection (winner, 1990 Changapuzha Award)
ഭൂമിപൂജ	Bhumipooja	1991	Poetry collection
കടവനാടിൻ്റെ ഓർമകൾ	Kadvanadinte Ormakal	2010	Biography (published posthumously)

== Awards and enduring legacy ==
Kadavanad Kuttikrishnan died on 19 August 1992, at the age of 66 at Calicut, Kerala. His contributions to Malayalam literature and culture are commemorated through his major awards and a "living legacy" that continues in his name.

=== 1978 Kerala Sahitya Akademi Award and others ===
Kuttikrishnan's most significant literary honor was the Kerala Sahitya Akademi Award for Poetry, which he received in 1978 for his poetry collection Suprabhāthaṁ (Suprabhatham). Some official award lists may carry a spelling variation, Siprabhatham; however, textual and catalog sources confirm Suprabhāthaṁ (Auspicious Dawn) as the correct title. He also received the Odakuzhal Award for Kalimuttam in 1986 and the Changapuzha Award for Vazhimuthu in 1990.

Award Ceremonies

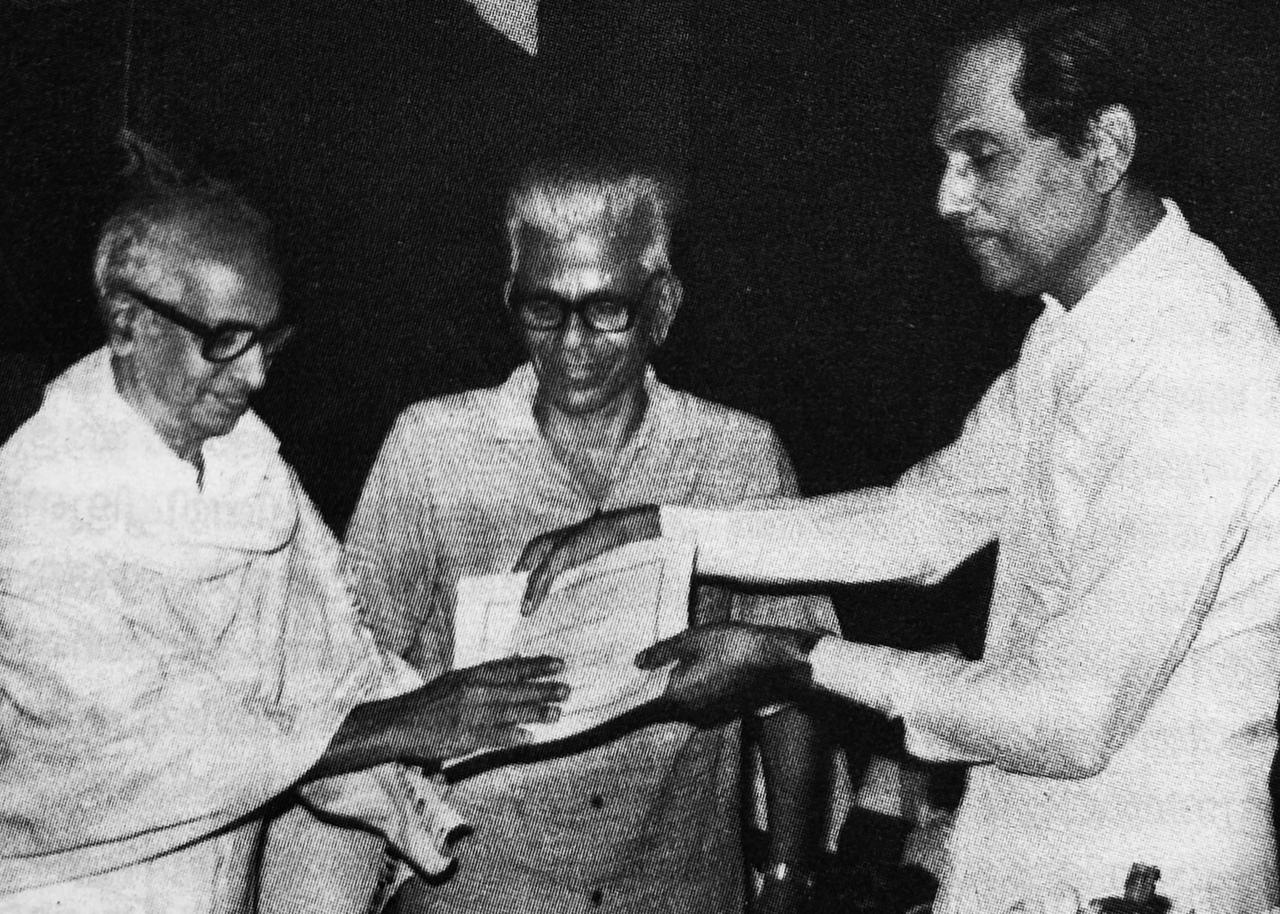
Receiving the Changapuzha Award from Justice Shankaran Nair, alongside Akkitham.

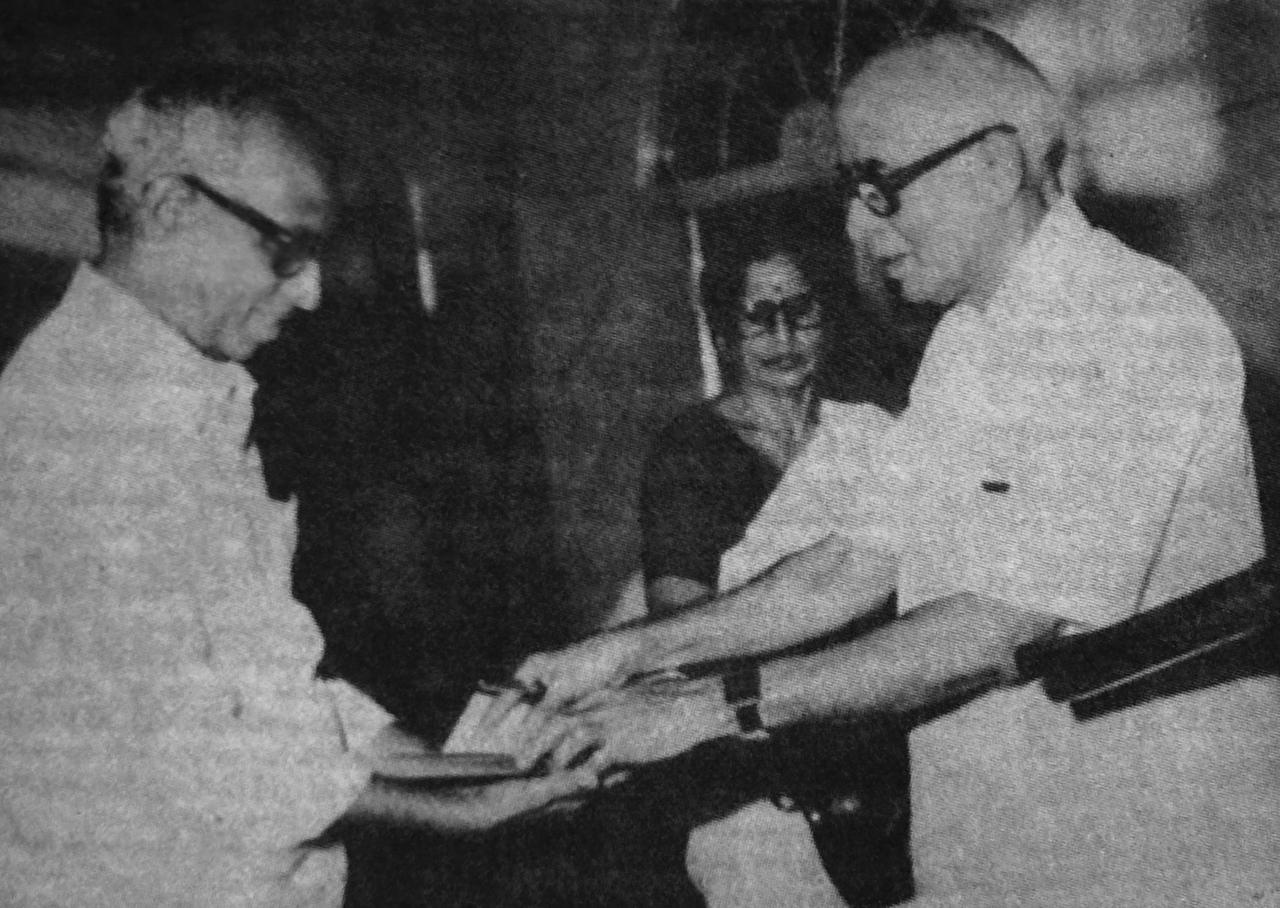
Receiving the Odakuzhal Award from N. V. Krishna Varrier

=== Portrait at Kozhikode Town Hall ===
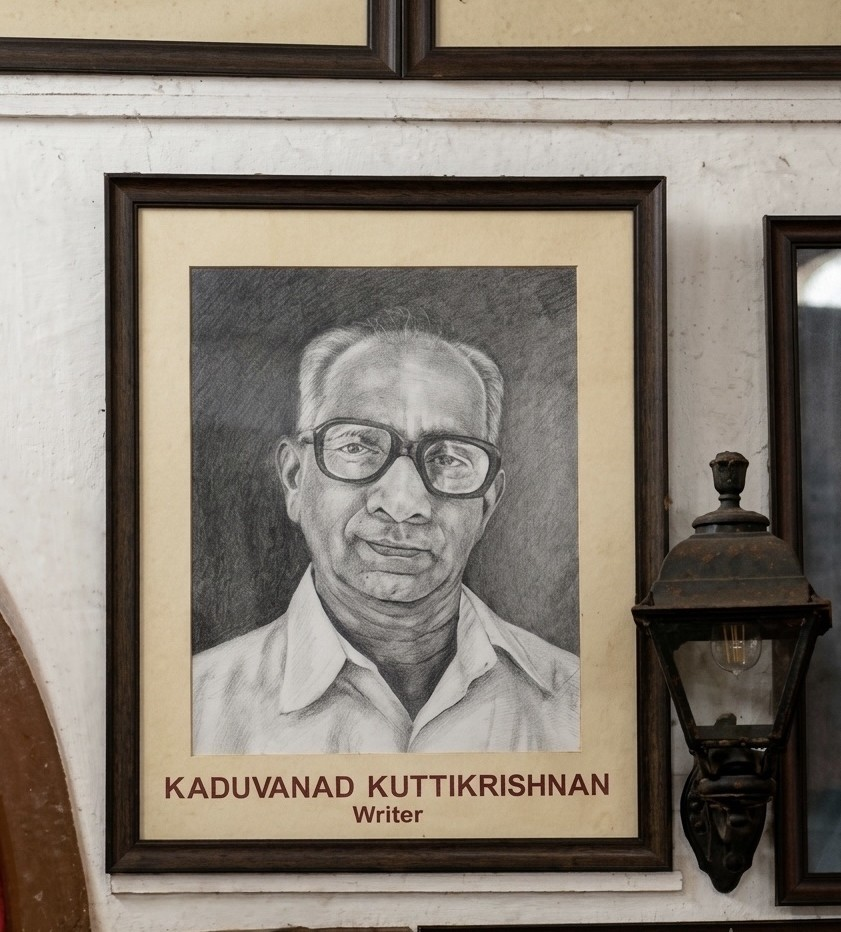
Portrait of Kadavanad Kuttikrishnan displayed at Kozhikode Town Hall

Following his death in 1992, a portrait of Kadavanad Kuttikrishnan was unveiled at Kozhikode Town Hall, adjacent to Mananchira Square in the heart of the city, in recognition of his contributions to Malayalam literature and journalism. The Town Hall, one of Kozhikode's most prominent cultural landmarks and a historic venue closely associated with the city's literary, artistic and cultural heritage, houses portraits of several distinguished personalities who have made significant contributions to Kerala's cultural and public life. Kuttikrishnan's portrait continues to be displayed there, serving as a lasting tribute to his literary legacy and enduring influence.

=== Commemoration in Ponnani ===
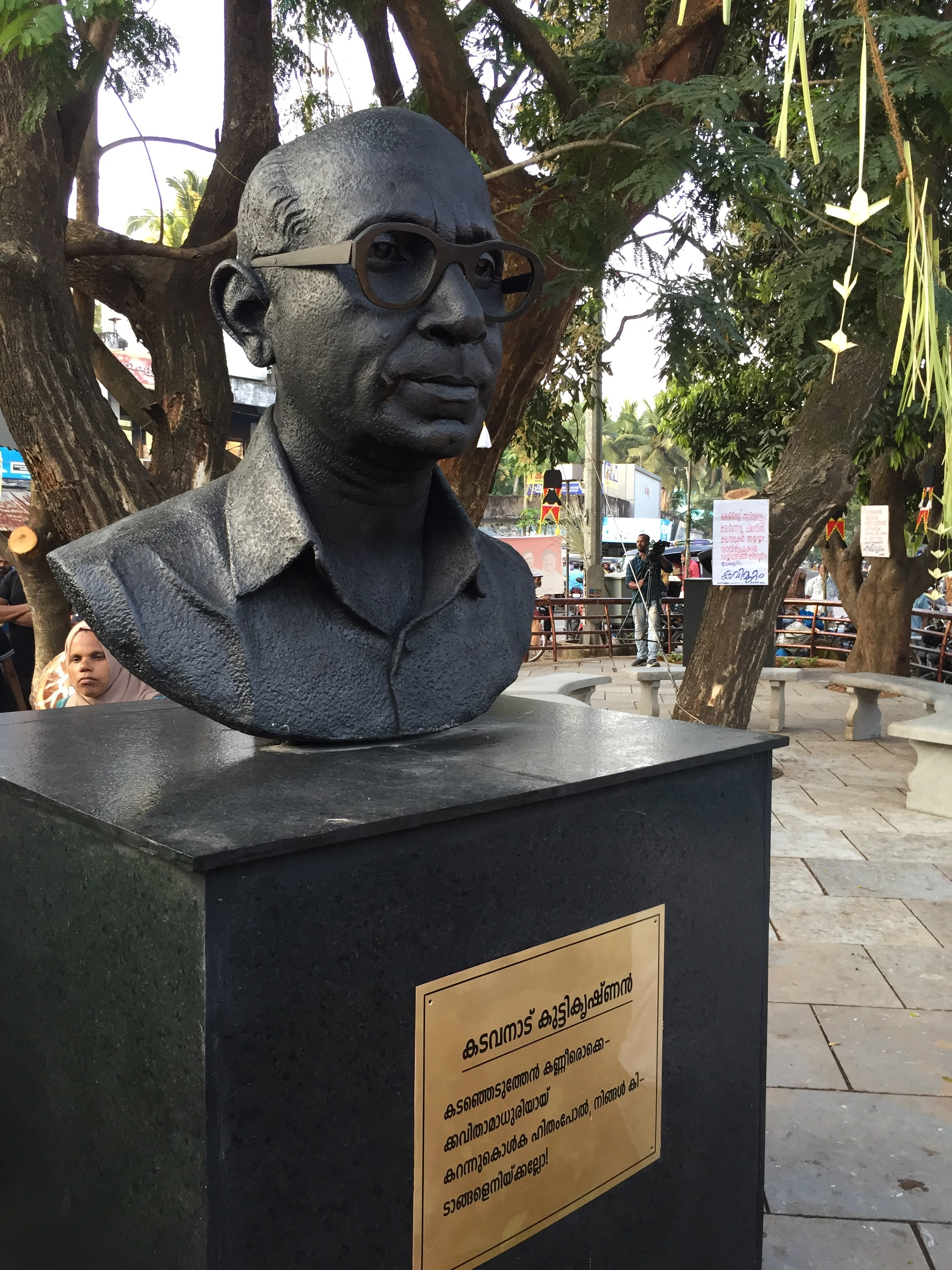
Kadavanad Kuttikrishnan Kavimuttam Statue

Kuttikrishnan is permanently memorialized in his hometown of Ponnani at the Kavimuttam garden (Poet's Courtyard). This public space contains the statues of the three key figures of the Ponnani literary renaissance: Uroob (P.C. Kuttikrishnan), Kadavanad Kuttikrishnan, and Edasseri Govindan Nair. His placement alongside Edasseri and Uroob affirms his position as part of the core triumvirate of the "Ponnani Kalari."

=== Living legacy: The Kadavanad Smrithi Poetry Award ===
Kuttikrishnan's legacy is most actively maintained by the Kadavanad Kuttikrishnan Memorial Committee. This committee presents the 'Kadavanad Smrithi Poetry Award' (Kadavanad Memorial Poetry Award) in his honor. The committee's stated aim is to "honour young talents in the literary field". This mission reflects the role Kuttikrishnan himself played: as a young man in the "Ponnani Kalari" and, later, as a senior journalist and editor shaping new literary trends.

=== Birth centenary ===
The birth centenary of Kadavanad Kuttikrishnan was observed in 2025. To mark the occasion, a major commemorative event was jointly organized by the Kerala Sahitya Akademi and the Edasseri Kalapadasala on 16 November 2025 at the Edasseri Smaraka Mandiram in Ponnani. The event was inaugurated by poet O. V. Usha and presided over by Prof. K. V. Ramakrishnan (President, Edasseri Smaraka Samithi). C. P. Aboobacker (Secretary, Kerala Sahitya Akademi) delivered the welcome address. The programme included commemorative lectures on Kuttikrishnan's poetry and social interventions by Dr. K. P. Mohanan and P. P. Sreedharanunni. Kadavanad's daughter Arundhathi E. A. and Edasseri's son E. Madhavan shared personal reminiscences during the session 'Ormayile Kadavanad'.
