= Vallakam =

- town
- Location in Kerala, India Vallakam (India)
- Coordinates: 9.768085°N 76.417967°E
- Country: India
- State: Kerala
- District: Kottayam

Languages
  - Official: Malayalam, English
- Time zone: UTC+5:30 (IST)
- Vehicle registration: KL-

Vallakam, is a village in Vaikom Taluk of Kottayam district in the southern Indian state of Kerala.

== Economy ==
Set in the backdrop of the state's famed backwaters, the economy of Vallakam used to be based on rice and coconut cultivation. This has changed significantly in recent decades. Rice cultivation has been largely abandoned due to economic unviability, while coconut cultivation has declined owing to parasitic diseases such as Mandari and falling market prices. As of now, Vallakam's economy is based on what is left of coconut cultivation, newly introduced cash crops like nutmeg (Myristica fragrans), cacao (Theobroma cacao) and remittances sent by people from the village working in other Indian states and abroad and trade.

== Demographics ==
The population of Vallakam is predominantly Hindu, with Christian and Muslim minorities. The Hindu community is diverse, including Ezhava, Nair and various Dalit communities.

Notable places of worship include St. Mary's Church Vallakam, Areekulangara Bhagawati Temple and Thuruvelikunnu Dhruva Temple. St. Mary's Church manages St. Mary's High School.

== Transportation ==
Vaikom-Ettumanoor Road which traverses Vallakam is the main road linking the village with prominent markets like Thalayolaparambu and Kuruppanthara to the East and the municipal town of Vaikom to the West. The village's system of canals too were important in transportation till recent times. These are non-functional now because of large scale 'filling' of them for housing and other purposes and due to the spread of the fresh water weed called in Malayalam 'African payal' (Salvinia molesta) which chokes inland waterways.
