= K. K. Raja =

Indian poet

- Born: Kunju; 28 March 1893; Kumarapuram, Thalappilli, Kingdom of Cochin, British India
- Died: 6 April 1968 (aged 75)
- Occupation: Poet
- Writing career
- Language: Malayalam

K. K. Raja (28 March 1893 – 6 April 1968) was a Malayalam poet from Kerala, India. He received the Kerala Sahitya Akademi Award in 1960 for the collection Malanatil.

== Biography ==
K. K. Raja was born as Kunju in 1893 at Kumarapuram kovilakam (part of the Thalappilli Swaroopam of Kingdom of Cochin ) which is situated in Eravimangalam village, Nadathara. His father Meledath Nambothan Nambudiri was a Sanskrit scholar. After the death of his mother Kunjukkutti Thamburatti, young Kunju was well taken care of by his grandmother. He completed his school education in Trichur and Kunnamkulam. He was married to a lady from the aristocratic Thrissur Vadakke Kuruppath Menon family. He started writing poems at a young age and the child's writing skills were encouraged by family friend and famous poet Kunhikuttan Thampuran. His first poem "Khshanika Vairagyam" was published in Kavana Kaumudi magazine. After passing successfully the Vidwan test, Raja worked as a teacher in Ernakulam Government Girls' High School and Irinjalakkuda Government High School. Raja became a full-time writer by this period and wandered all over India before joining St. Thomas School, Trichur.

== Major works ==
- Malanattil (മലനാട്ടിൽ)
- Kavanakusumanjali (കവനകുസുമാഞ്ജലി)
- Tulsidaamam (തുളസീദാമം)
- Vellithoni (വെള്ളിത്തോണി)
- Bashpanjali (ബാഷ്പാഞ്ജലി)
- Harshanjali (ഹർഷാഞ്ജലി)
