= K. P. Narayana Pisharody =

Indian scholar (1909–2004)

Kodikkunnu Pisharathu Narayana Pisharody (23 August 1909 – 21 March 2004) was a Sanskrit scholar, teacher and writer of Kerala, India.

== Life ==
He was born on 23 August 1909 in Kodikkunnu near Pattambi in Palakkad district to Puthisseri Pasupathi Namboothiri and Narayani Pisharasyar. He learned Sanskrit from Punnasseri Nambi Neelakanta Sharma of Pattambi and Attoor Krishna Pisharody.

After passing Sahithyashiromani examination from Sanskrit college Pattambi in 1932 he taught Malayalam and Sanskrit in various schools and colleges. After retirement from Sree Kerala Varma College, Thrissur conducted research under University Grants Commission fellowship. He has also received the titles "Sahitya nipunan" "Pandita thilakam" and "Sahitya rathnam." In 1999 "Ezhuthachan Puraskaram" the highest literary honour of the Kerala Government was awarded to Pisharody. He died at his home in Thrissur on 21 March 2004, aged 94. He was cremated with full state honours at his home in Thrissur.
