= M. N. Paloor =

Indian poet (1932–2018)

Paloor Madhavan Namboothiri (22 June 1932 – 9 October 2018), commonly known as M. N. Paloor, was a Malayalam-language poet from Kerala, India. He was one of the early modernist poets in Malayalam but his writings were steeped in the poetic tradition of Malayalam. He was a recipient of the Kerala Sahitya Akademi Award, the state's highest literary honour, in 1983 for his collection Kalikalam. He also received the Kendra Sahitya Akademi Award for his autobiography Kathayillathavante Katha in 2013.

== Life ==
He was born as the son of Paloor Manakkal Madhavan Namboothiri, Sr. and Sreedevi Antharjanam on 22 June 1932 in Parakkadavu, Ernakulam. Hailing from a very conservative Namboothiri family, he learned Sanskrit under scholar K. P. Narayana Pisharody at an early age. He also had the opportunity to learn Kathakali at Kerala Kalamandalam under Pattikkanthodi Ravunny Menon and Vazhenkada Kunju Nair. He is not formally educated.

Growing up in an impoverished Namboothiri household in Paravoor, poetry was his mother's most precious gift to him. His mother got married at the age of 14. She would recite him poems, of G. Sankara Kurup, of Poonthanam and Ezhuthachan. He repeated verses everywhere, at home, while playing or merely gazing at the waters of the Chalakkudy river.

He left home to Bombay and engaged in different trades for a living. He had served the Indian Airlines in Bombay. He worked first in the transport department and later in the maintenance section and retired as Senior operator of Ground Supporting Division in 1990. After retirement he settled in Kovoor in Calicut.

== Poetry ==
Paloor is the author of some of the finest Malayalam poems of the latter half of the 20th century. His major collections are Kalikalam, Pedithondan, Theerthayathra, Bhangiyum Abhangiyum, Sangamasangeetham, Pachamanga and Sarga Dhara.

It was a personal tragedy that made him turn to poetry seriously. "It was after my sister's death at the age of 22 that poetry grew in stature in my life," he says.

Paloor's poems traced the sufferings of mankind involving all the complexities of a highly urbanised system. He is one of those poets who were part of a major turning point in the history of 20th-century Malayalam poetry. Poet and scholar K. Satchidanandan writes in Indian Literature, the Sahitya Akademi publication: "M.N. Paloor conceives God as a Sultan, smoking his pipe filled with dried human lives (The Coward). He envisages himself as the crazy poet of the 20th century caught between comets and Boeings, living on Anacin (A Poet at the Airport)."

== Works ==
- Pedithondan (The Coward)
- Kalikalam
- Theerthayathra (The Pilgrimage)
- Sugama Sangeetham
- Kavitha (The Poem)
- Pachamanga (Raw Mango)
- Bhangiyum Abhangiyum
- Ardhanareeswaran
- Kathayillathavante Katha (Autobiography)

== Death ==
He died due to age-related ailments on 9 October 2018, at the age of 86.

== Awards ==
- 1983: Kerala Sahitya Akademi Award (Poetry) for Kalikalam
- 2009: Asan Memorial Poetry Prize
- 2004: Kerala Sahitya Akademi Award for his over all contribution
- 2007: O.M.C. Narayanan Namboodiripad Memorial Deviprasadam Award
- 2007: Kavanakauthukam-Kanipayyur Award for Ardhanareeswaran
- 2007: Deviprasadam Trust Award
- 2013: Kendra Sahitya Akademi Award for his autobiography Kathayillathavante Katha
