= N. G. Unnikrishnan =

Indian poet

- Born: 4 February 1949 (age 77); Ezhikkara, Paravur, Travancore-Cochin, India
- Occupation: Poet
- Writing career
- Language: Malayalam, English
- Notable awards: Kerala Sahitya Akademi Award for Poetry (2022)

N. G. Unnikrishnan is an Indian Malayalam language poet and translator. He received the Kerala Sahitya Akademi Award for Poetry in 2022 for his work Kadasuvidya.

== Biography ==
N. G. Unnikrishnan was born on February 4, 1949, at Ezhikkara, Paravur.. He holds postgraduate degree in English literature and LLB.

Unnikrishnan served in the Indian Air Force for ten years and after retiring from there, he worked as a teacher at Cochin College. After retiring as Associate professor, he became a freelance writer.

He currently lives in his house Manasam in Kaitharam, North Paravur, Ernakulam District.

== Literary contributions ==
His first poetry collection Oru Kuruvi, Oru Maram was published in 1989). In 2012, he translated In Praise of the Stepmother by Peruvian writer Mario Vargas Llosa into Malayalam as Randanammakkku Stuti. It was Llosa's first translated work in Malayalam. The anthology of poems titled Ten Sentences About the Cow, written and translated by him was released at Kochi Binnale in 2017. His poems were also included in poetry anthologies like Kavithayude Noottand (meaning Century of Poems) which includes Malayalam poems from 1900 to 2000, and Vettuvazhi Kavithakal.

=== Poetic Style ===
In a critical study by Justin P. James published in the peer-reviewed research journal Irayam published by the Department of Malayalam, Sree Neelakanta Government Sanskrit College, Pattambi, titled "Artha Kendrathinte Abhavam: N. G. Unnikrishnan Kavithakalile Apanirmithikal" [Absence of the Center of Meaning: Deconstructions in N. G. Unnikrishnan's Poems], Unnikrishnan is described as a poet associated with the transition from modernism to postmodernism in Malayalam poetry. The study also notes that poet Anwar Ali described him as a "poet's poet". In another critical study, Dr. Roshni Swapna notes that Unnikrishnan breaks away from established paths in Malayalam poetry, using personal experience and everyday life to engage with broader historical, political and existential themes.

== Works ==
=== Poetry collection ===
- Katalasuvidya (in Malayalam). D C Books. 2020. ISBN 9789353902292.
- Pasuvinekkurichu Pathu Vaachakangal / Yanthravum Ente Jeevithavum (in Malayalam). D C Books. 2015. ISBN 8126433531. It is a two-way volume bringing together two independent poetry collections originally published in 2011 by the same publisher.
- Cheruthu Valuthakunnathu (in Malayalam). D C Books. 2013. ISBN 8126419059. Poetry collection.
- Ten Sentences about the Cow and Other Poems. authorspress. 2017. ISBN 978-9352074419.
- Oru Kuruvi, Oru Maram [One Sparrow, One Tree] (in Malayalam). Aluva: Bansuri books. 1989.

=== Memoirs ===
- Ezhikkarakkurippukal (in Malayalam). D C Books. 2024. ISBN 9789362541406.

=== Translations ===
- Mario Vargas Llosa (2013). Randanammakku Stuthi (in Malayalam). Translated by N. G. Unnikrishnan. DC Books. ISBN 978-8126408511.
- Etgar Keret (2011). Daivamakan Kothicha Bus Driver (in Malayalam). Translated by N. G. Unnikrishnan. DC Books.

== Awards and honours ==
In 2022, Unnikrishnan was awarded the Kerala Sahitya Akademi Award for Poetry for his work Kadalasavidya.
