= V. Shinilal =

Malayalam language writer

- Born: Thiruvananthapuram, Kerala, India
- Occupation: Writer
- Notable work: Sambarkkakranti
- Awards: 2022 Kerala Sahitya Akademi Award for Novel

V. Shinilal is an Indian novelist and short story writer of the contemporary Malayalam literature. He won the Kerala Sahitya Akademi award for Novel in 2022 for his work Sambarkkakranti.

== Biography ==
Shinilal was born at Nedumangad Irinchayam in Thiruvananthapuram district in Kerala. He works as a traveling ticket inspector in Southern Railway Thiruvananthapuram Division. His major works includes Adi, 124, Sambarkkakranthi, Buddhapatham, Garisappa Aruvi Adhava Oru Jalayathra,Iru. In 2023, Shinilal was awarded the 2022 Kerala Sahitya Akademi Award for the novel Sambarkkakranti. He is also a recipient of the first Karoor Award and Padmarajan Award.
