= N. V. Krishna Warrier =

Indian academic and poet (1916–1989)

- Born: 13 May 1916; Njeruvisseri, Thrissur, India
- Died: 12 October 1989 (aged 73); Kozhikode, Kerala
- Occupations: Poet, scholar, critic, essayist
- Years active: 1936–1989
- Spouse: Lakshmikutty Warasyar
- Awards: 1970 Kerala Sahitya Akademi Award for Poetry; 1979 Kendra Sahitya Akademi Award; 1986 Kerala Sahitya Akademi Fellowship

Nerukkavu Variam Krishna Warrier (13 May 1916 – 12 October 1989) was an Indian poet, journalist, scholar, academic and political thinker. A prolific writer, Warrier's works covered the genres of poetry, drama, travelogue, translation, children's literature and science. He was a recipient of the Sahitya Akademi Award and the Kerala Sahitya Akademi Award for Poetry. The Kerala Sahitya Akademi honoured him with their fellowship in 1986, three years before his death in 1989.

== Biography ==
Nerukkavu Variam Krishna Warrier was born on 13 May 1916 in Njeruvisseri, near Arattupuzha in Thrissur district of the south Indian state of Kerala to Padikkaparambu Warriath Achutha Warrier and Madhavi Warasyar. He had two brothers, Shankara Warrier and Achutha Warrier and a sister, Ikkalikutty Warasyar. Krishna got his family name, Nerukkavu Variam, through matrilineal succession.

His early schooling was at the primary school in Vallachira after which he studied at the Sanskrit school in Peruvanam where he had the opportunity to study under Meloth Raghavan Nambiar and Keshavan Elayathu, both Sanskrit scholars. Later, he studied grammar under B. Sankaranarayana Shasthri of Tripunithura Sanskrit School (present-day Government Sanskrit College, Tripunithura) to pass Vyakarana Bhooshanam examination and learned Kavyaprakasham and Dhwanyalokam under K. Rama Pisharodi to pass Kavya Shiromani examination. Simultaneously, he passed Hindi Visharad examination too.

Warrier started his career as a tutor at the Government Sanskrit College, Tripunithura but moved to Sreemoolanagaram Sanskrit School and later to Brahmanandodayam Sanskrit School, Kalady. In 1942, he resigned from his job to participate in Quit India Movement and ran a newspaper, Swathanthra Bharatham while in hiding. Afterwards, he joined Govt High School Kodakara as a teacher and in 1948, joined Sree Kerala Varma College as its faculty. Subsequently, he had a short stint at Madras Christian College, too, before joining Mathrubhumi in 1952 as a member of its editorial board where he stayed until he was selected as the founder director of Kerala Bhasha Institute in 1968. After his superannuation from the institute in 1975, he rejoined Mathrubhumi as the chief editor; he also worked with Kunkumam weekly for a short while.

Warrier was married to Lakshmikutty Warasyar of the Palakkattu Kattukulath Puthan Warriath family, the marriage taking place in 1948, and the couple had 3 daughters, Usha, Parvathy and Vani, all of them medical doctors. His death came on 12 October 1989 in Kozhikode at the age of 73.

== Legacy ==
Krishna Warrier, a polyglot who could handle 18 languages, was a writer whose body of work covered several genres of literature such as poetry, drama, travelogue, translation, children's literature and science. He was the author the Kerala Sahitya Akademi Award winning Gandhiyum Godseyum, a poem where he positioned Mohandas Gandhi and Nathuram Godse in various situations in the post-independent India for commenting on the socio-political state of affairs. Besides other poetry anthologies like Kochuthomman and Kalidasante Simhasanam, he also wrote literary criticisms such as Vallatholinte Kavyasilpam and a treatise in English, titled A History of Malayalam Metre.

Krishna Warrier was the first editor of Akhila Vijnana Kosam, an encyclopaedia in Malayalam. He was considered one of the best literary editors of his times. He is also credited with efforts on modernisation of Malayalam language; it was during his time as the head of the Kerala Bhasha Institute, the institute initiated efforts to modernise Malayalam typewriter. Krishna Warrier presided the Kerala Union of Working Journalists and the Sahitya Pravathaka Sahakarana Sangham (SPCS), served as a member of the Sahitya Akademi (advisory committee on Malayalam) and Kerala Sahitya Akademi, held the position of the treasurer of Kerala Sasthra Sahithya Parishad, chaired the Sanskrit Committee of the Government of Kerala and sat in the advisory committee of the Jnanpith Award.

== Awards and honours ==
Kerala Sahitya Akademi selected Krishna Warrier for their annual award for poetry in 1970, for his work, Gandhiyum Godseyum. Seven years later, he received the 1979 Kendra Sahitya Akademi Award for his book Vallatholinte Kavyasilpam (literary criticism). Kerala Sahitya Akademi honoured him again in 1986 with their Fellowship. He was also honoured by the University of Calicut by awarding him the degree of DLitt.

Two eponymous organizations have been formed in his memory, the N. V. Krishna Warrior Memorial Trust and the N. V. Sahitya Vedi; the former has instituted an annual literary award, the N. V. Krishna Warrior Literary Award while the latter has its own award in the name of N. V. Sahitya Vedi Award. N. V. Krishna Warrior Memorial Trust have also launched a digital archive to conserve Warrier's work online.

== Positions held ==
- Teacher – Sanskrit School, Kaladi
- Teacher – Sanskrit College, Tripunithura
- Publisher – Swathanthra Bharatham
- Chief Editor – Mathrubhumi
- Director – Kerala Bhasha Institute
- Editor – Kumkumam
- Editor – Yuga Prabhath.
- Editor – Akhila Vijnana Kosam
- President – Kerala Union of Working Journalists
- President – Sahitya Pravathaka Sahakarana Sangham (SPCS)
- President – Kerala Sahitya Parishad
- President – Kerala Sahitya Sammithi
- Member – Kerala Sahitya Akademi
- Member – National Book Development Council
- Member – Official Bhasha Committee.

== Bibliography ==
=== Poetry ===
- N. V. Krishna Warrier (1969). Gandhijiyum Godseyum. Kottayam: S.P.C.S.
- Krishna Warrier, N. V. (1964). Vidyapathi. Kottayam: S.P.C.S.
- Krishna Warrier, N. V. Kaalidasante Simhasanam.
- Krishna Warrier, N. V. (1955). Kochu Thomman. Kottayam: S.P.C.S.
- Krishna Warier, N. V. (1986). N V Yute kavithakal (in Malayalam). Kottayam, N B S.
- Krishna Warrier, N. V. Neenda Kavithakal.
- Krishna Warrier, N. V. Kurekkoode Neenda Kavithakal.
- Krishna Warrier, N. V. Chattavar.
- Krishna Warrier, N. V. Puzhakal.
- Krishna Warrier, N. V. Rakthasakshi.
- Krishna Warrier, N. V. Aksharam Padikkuvin.
- Nayagraprapatam- Sanskrit Poetry. Published with commentary in Sanskrit by Dr. V.R. Muralidharan. By the Department of Sanskrit Sahitya, Sree Sankaracharya University of Sanskrit, Kalady https://scart.ssus.ac.in/?page=2.

=== Translations ===
- Akam kavithakal. Translated by Krishna Warrier, N. V. Thrissur, Kerala Sahithya Akademi Ke. 2007. ISBN 9788176901260.
- Ezhu German Kathakal. Translated by Krishna Warrier, N. V.
- Gandhiyude Vidyarthi Jeevitham. Translated by Krishna Warrier, N. V.
- Devadasan. Translated by Krishna Warrier, N. V.
- Manthra Vidya. Translated by Krishna Warrier, N. V.
- Sumathi. Translated by Krishna Warrier, N. V.

=== Essays and literary criticisms ===
- Krishna Warrier, N. V. (1977). Vallatholinte Kavyashilpam.
- Krishna Warrier, N. V. (1976). Samaakalanam. Thiruvananthapuram: Navadhaara.
- Krishna Warrier, N. V. (1967). Pariprekshyam. Current Books. Archived from the original on 6 March 2019.
- Krishna Warrier, N. V. (1967). Kalotsavam. Current Books.
- Krishna Warrier, N. V. (1983). Velluvilikal Prathikaranangal. Kottayam: D.C. Books.
- Krishna Warrier, N. V. (1986). Kaavyakauthukam (3rd ed.). Kozhikode: Poorna.
- Krishna Warrier, N. V. (editor); Velayudhan Nair, K. (editor) (1974). Saksharata. Trivandrum: State Institute of Languages.
- K V M; Tr; Kautilya; Author; Krishna Warrier, N. V; Editor (1935). Kautilyante Arthasasthram. Sree Ramavarma Grandhavali. Thrissur, Kerala Sahithya Akademi.
- Krishna Warrier, N. V; Ed; Sebastian Paul (1984). Manushyanum thozhilum.
- Krishna Warrier, N. V; Author (1989). Samskrtha vyaakaranathinu Kerala Paniniyude sambhaavana.
- Krishna Warrier, N. V. (1989). Bhoomiyude rasathanthram. New Delhi, Indian Etheest Publishers.
- Krishna Warrier, N. V. (1989). Anweshanangal Kandethalukal.
- Krishna Warrier, N. V; Author (1987). Prasnangal, padhanangal.
- Krishna Warrier, N. V. (1990). Olangal aazhangal.
- Krishna Warrier, N. V. (1989). N V yude gaveshana prabandhangal. Kozhikkode, Mathrubhoomi.
- Krishna Warrier, N. V. (1987). Mananangal nigamanangal.
- Krishna Warrier, N. V. (1985). Samasyakal samaadhanangal.
- Krishna Warrier, N. V. (1988). Velluvilikal prathikaranangal. Kottayam, DCB.
- Krishna Warrier, N. V. (1989). Veekshanangal vimarsanangal.
- Krishna Warrier, N. V; Author (1999). Smrithichithrangal. Kottayam, D C Books. ISBN 9788126400492.
- Krishna Warrier, N. V. (1988). Vichinthanangal visadeekaranangal. Kottayam, SPCS.
- N. V. Krishna Warrier (1977). A History of Malayalam Metre. Dravidian Linguistics Association.
- Krishna Warrier, N. V. Melpathurinte Vyakarana Prathibha.

=== Plays ===
- Krishna Warrier, N. V. (1986). N V yude naatakangal. Kozhikode: Poorna.
- Krishna Warrier, N. V. Vasco Da Gamayum Mattu Moonnu Nadakangalum.
- Krishna Warrier, N. V. Veera Ravi Varma Chakravarthi.
- Krishna Warrier, N. V. Asthi.

=== Attakkatha ===
- Krishna Warrier, N. V. (1962). Chithramgada. Ernakulam, CICC.
- Krishna Warrier, N. V. Budhacharitham.

=== Biographies ===
- Krishna Warrier, N. V. (1976). Aadharanjalikal. Poorna Publications.
- Krishna Warrier, N. V. Vyakthichithrangal.

=== Children's literature ===
- Krishna Warrier, N. V. Lekhanakala.
- Krishna Warrier, N. V. Jalavidya.

=== Travelogues ===
- Krishna Warrier, N. V. (1989). Puthiya chintha Soviet uniyanil.
- Krishna Warrier, N. V. Amerikkayiloode.
- Krishna Warrier, N. V. Unarunna Uthara India.

=== Other works ===
- Krishna Warrier, N. V; Ed; Sankara Kurup, G. (1984). Hridayathinte vaathaayanangal(Mahakavi G Sankara Kurupinte 131 kathukal).
- Krishna Warrier, N. V; Comp; Thomas, M. F. (1987). Indian cinema.
- Chandrasekharan Nair, Vaikom; Krishna Warrier, N. V; Comp (1987). Viswakalakal.
- Krishna Warrier, N. V; Ed (1988). Akhila Vijnaanakosam. 1.

== Works on N. V. Krishna Warrier ==
- K. V. Rāmakr̥iṣhṇan (2000). N.V. Krishna Warrier. Sahitya Akademi. ISBN 978-81-260-0950-3.
- Atmaraman (17 May 2017). Bahurupi N V: Tribute to N V Krishna Warrier. Centre for South Indian Studies. ISBN 978-93-83763-35-1.
