= Chempu =

- village
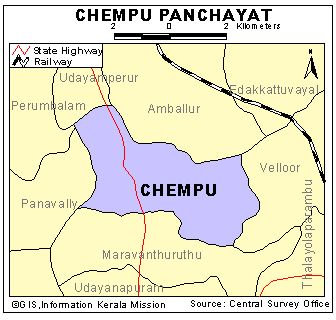
- Map of Chempu Panchayath
- Interactive map of Chempu
- Coordinates: 9°48′26″N 76°23′49″E
- Country: India
- State: Kerala
- District: Kottayam
- Established: 1953

Government
  - Type: Gramapanchayat

Area
  - Total: 18.42 km^{2} (7.11 sq mi)

Population
  - Total: 18,828
  - Density: 1,022/km^{2} (2,650/sq mi)

Languages
  - Official: Malayalam
- Time zone: UTC+5:30 (IST)
- PIN: 686608
- Vehicle registration: KL-36
- Nearest city: Kochi
- Literacy: 90%

Chempu (SH-15, Kochi-Kumarakom road) is a village near Vaikom in Kottayam, Kerala, India. It is bounded by the shores of the Lake Vembanad, and is crossed by various distributaries of the River Muvattupuzha.

== Demographics ==
It is inhabited by people of all communities including Arayans, Christians, Dhewars, Ezhavas, Muslims, Nairs and Namboothiris.

== Etymology ==
This place was an area of fishers and most of the population led their livelihood through fishing. The Brahmins who lived here were used to call the fish as 'Champa', consequently developed as Chempu.

== History ==
Chempu is the birthplace of Chempil Arayan. He was the captain of the army of Veluthampi Dalawa, the Travancore king. He was the first martyr from Tranvancore in the Indian Independence Movement.

The "Illi fort", which starts from the north-western corner of Brahmamangalam to the east was built during the construction of the Travancore kingdom by Marthandavarma between 1742 and 1756.The fort was used to determine the boundary between the Kochi kingdom and thereby to ensure the protection of Travancore. This was under the supervision of Ramayyan Dalawa, who was the minister of Marthandavarma.

== Geography ==
It lies at the north-western corner of Kottayam district and the Vaikom Taluk. The village is divided into three sections: Chempu, Kattikkunu, and Brahmamangalam. The North of the village is covered by Udayamperoor and Amballoor, the East by Velloor, South with Maravanthuruthu, and the West with Vembanad lake. Murinjapuzha in an intermediator between Chempu and Kattikkunnu.

Although Chempu is not an island, it is considered as a peninsula the Vembanad and Muvattupuzha river cover Chempu. Murinjapuzha bridge as the bridge which connects Kattikkunnu with Murinjapuzha (Chempu) Its distance from Kottayam is 38.4 km and from Vaikom, 6.5 km.

Distance to Chempu

| From | Distance(km) | Time |
|---|---|---|
| Thiruvananthapuram | 194 | 3 hours 55 minutes |
| Cochin | 26.2 | 34 minutes |
| Kottayam | 38.4 | 53 minutes |
| Vaikom | 6.5 | 11 minutes |

== Topography ==
Chempu has a cool climate. The presence of the river and lake makes the soil fertile and high-yielding. The main crops here are coconut and mango.

The topography of Brahmamangalam is entirely different from that of Chempu and Kattikkunnu more closely resembling Kottayam topography. The main crop here is rubber.
The average temperature here is around 27 °C and the humidity is 81%. The wind here blows from the west with an average velocity of 6 kmph

== Notable people ==
Notable people from Chempu includes warrior Chempil Arayan, archbishop Mar Augustine Kandathil, writer Chempil John, Vinod Narayanan, and the film actors Mammootty, Janardhanan (actor) and Chembil Ashokan.
