= Chathanath Achuthanunni =

Indian Malayalam-language writer and translator

- Born: March 10, 1939 (age 87); Guruvayur, Kingdom of Cochin, British India
- Occupations: Academic, literary critic, poet and translator
- Writing career
- Notable awards: Sahitya Akademi Translation Prize (2022); Kerala Sahitya Akademi Award for Overall Contributions (2011); Kerala Sahitya Akademi Award (1987)

Chathanath Achuthanunni (born in 1939) is a polyglot, Malayalam language writer and translator from Kerala, India. He received many awards including Kerala Sahitya Akademi Award for Overall Contributions (2011) Kerala Sahitya Akademi Award (1987) and Sahridayavedi Award (1988). In 2022 he received the Sahitya Akademi Translation Prize, a literary honour in India, presented by Sahitya Akademi, India's National Academy of Letters. In 2024, he received the Kairali Global Lifetime Achievement Prize for Researchers Award, presented by the Kerala government.

== Biography ==
Chathanath Achuthanunni was born on March 10, 1939, Chathanath, Guruvayur in present-day Thrissur district of Kerala to Menakaymal Vasudevanunnithan and Chathanath Madhavikuttyamma. His father Menakaimal, who was a polyglot scholar and poet, knew Malayalam, English, Sanskrit, Hindi, Bengali languages.

Achuthanunni holds degrees including Sahitya Visarada, M.A. Sanskrit, M.A. Malayalam and Ph.D. From 1957 to 1964 he was a teacher at the High School and from 1965 to 1971 at the Catholic College, Pathanamthitta. He then worked as a lecturer in the Malayalam department of the University of Calicut from 1971 and became a professor in 1983 and the head of the department from 1986. He later became Dean of the Faculty of Languages at the university. After his retirement in 2000, he also served as visiting professor at Kerala Kalamandalam.

Achuthanunni has also worked as the Founder Secretary of Vallathol Vidyapeeth (Shukapuram) and Vice Chairman of Tirur Thunchans Memorial.

== Literary contributions ==
Publishing poems and essays in periodicals since 1955, Achuthanunni made remarkable contributions in the fields of linguistics, poetics and literary criticism. When he was 15, his first poetry collection 'Muraliganam' was published by Shanta Bookstall, a small publishing house in his birthplace Guruvayur. They also selected and published drama songs written by him during that time. He has also said that he had written and published a detective novel named 'Prethadurgam' in his youth.

Achuthanunni's major literary contribution is his critical study of Indian literary theories with a contemporary perspective. His profound studies on Malayalam literary theories such as Kavyalankaram, Kavi Kandabharanam, and Vakrokthijeevitham are later published as more than fifty research articles and in his book Neethi Darshana published in 1983. His book Alarkarasastram Malayalathil (1984) is notable as the first attempt to comprehensively evaluate literary texts in Malayalam.

Achuthanunni has also written many poems in Sanskrit and Malayalam. His major poetry collections are Thirunadayil and Layam.

== Selected works ==
- Achuthanunni, Chathanath (2015). Bharatheeya Sahithya Darshanam (in Malayalam). Kottayam: National Book Stall. Literary criticism.
- Achuthanunni, Chathanath (1999). Sahithya Meemamsa (in Malayalam). Kottayam: Current Books. Literary criticism.
- Achuthanunni, Chathanath (2014). Tharathamya sahithya parichayam (in Malayalam). Kottayam: Sahithya Pravarthaka Co-operative Society. Literary study.
- Achuthanunni, Chathanath (1973). Thirunadayil sahithya parichayam (in Malayalam). Poems.
- Achuthanunni, Chathanath (1999). Thiranjedutha kavithakal (in Malayalam). Kottayam: Current Books. Poetry collection.
- Achuthanunni, Chathanath (2003). Alankara shasthram Malayalathil (in Malayalam) (Second ed.). Kottayam: Kerala Bhasha Institute. Study.
- Achuthanunni, Chathanath (1971). Bhasha oru padanam (in Malayalam). Kottayam: National Book Stall. Study.
- Achuthanunni, Chathanath (1967). Varthamana pusthakathinu oru avatharika (in Malayalam). Kottayam: National Book Stall. Malayalam literature history and study.
- Achuthanunni, Chathanath (1967). Swapnavasavadhatha (in Malayalam). MS Book Depot. Poetry.
- Achuthanunni, Chathanath (1967). Devantam priya (in Malayalam). Kottayam: National Book Stall.
- Achuthanunni, Chathanath (1974). Layam (in Malayalam). Kottayam: National Book Stall. Poetry.
- Achuthanunni, Chathanath (2001). Kavya chintha (in Malayalam). Kozhikode: Lipi publications. Poetry study.
- Achuthanunni, Chathanath (1983). Reethi darshanam (in Malayalam). Shukapuram: Vallathol vidhyapeedam. Poetry study.
- Achuthanunni, Chathanath (1981). Sahithya darshanam - Prabandha rachanayude thathwangal (in Malayalam). Shukapuram: Vallathol vidhyapeedam. Malayalam literature research.
- Achuthanunni, Chathanath (1999). Vangmayam (in Malayalam). Kozhikode: PK Brothers. Study.
- Achuthanunni, Chathanath (1973). Thatha paranja kathakal (in Malayalam). Kottayam: Vidyarthimithram. Malayalam drama collection in the genre children's literature.
- Achuthanunni, Chathanath (2015). Edaaseri (in Malayalam). Shukapuram: Vallathol vidhyapeedam. Literary criticism of poems of Edasseri Govindan Nair.
- Achuthanunni, Chathanath (2015). Rasadhwani- Vimarshathmaka sameepanam (in Malayalam). Shukapuram: Vallathol vidhyapeedam. Sanskrit literature history and criticism.
- Achuthanunni, Chathanath (2016). Alankaram- Kalidasa kavithaye munnirthi oru saundaryavicharam (in Malayalam). Shukapuram: Vallathol vidhyapeedam. Study on poem of Kalidasa.
- Achuthanunni, Chathanath (2017). Unnichirutheyi charitham (in Malayalam). Kottayam: Sahithya Pravarthaka Co-operative Society. Poetry.
- Achuthanunni, Chathanath (1969). Manipravala rathnavali (in Malayalam). MS Book Depot. Poetry study.
- Achuthanunni, Chathanath (1984). Shailee vijnanam (in Malayalam). Shukapuram: Vallathol vidhyapeedam. Applied linguistics.
- Achuthanunni, Chathanath (2006). Gaveshanam - Prabandha rachanayude thathwangal (in Malayalam). Shukapuram: Vallathol vidhyapeedam. Malayalam literature research.
- Achuthanunni, Chathanath (2007). Kokasandesham (in Malayalam). Shukapuram: Vallathol vidhyapeedam. Study on ancient poetry.
- Achuthanunni, Chathanath (2007). Vamanacharyante Kavyalankara Sutra Vrithi (in Malayalam). Translated from Sanskrit (For this he received Sahitya Akademi Award for Translation).
- Anandha vardhante dhanyalokam (in Malayalam). Kerala Sahitya Akademi. 2021. ISBN 9780000138675.
- Linguistics - General and Dravidian. Asian Book Stall. 1970.

== Awards and honors ==
In 1986, Achuthanunni received the Kerala Sahitya Akademi Award for his work "Alankarashastram Malayalathil" and in 1980, he received the Prof. C.N. Antony Award for his work "Reethidarshanam". He received the Kerala Sahitya Akademi Award for Overall Contributions in 2011, and the Certificate of Honor Award from the President of India in 2019. In 2022 he received the Sahitya Akademi Translation Prize, a literary honour in India, presented by Sahitya Akademi, India's National Academy of Letters.

In 2024, Chathanath Achuthanunni received the Kairali Global Lifetime Achievement Prize for Researchers Award, presented by the Kerala government to prominent scientists for their comprehensive contribution. In the same year he received the Professor S. Guptan Nair Award instituted by the Prof. S. Guptan Nair Foundation for teachers who have made major contributions to the field of culture. For his comprehensive contribution to Malayalam literature, he received the Balamaniyamma Award presented by the Kochi International Book Festival Committee, in 2025.

== Controversies ==
In 2019, Chathanath Achuthanunni was accused of plagiarism. The allegation was made by Dr. Shooba K. S., a college teacher and a Literary Critic. It was alleged that, An article by Achuthanunni in the November–December 2019 issue of Sahithya Vimarshanam magazine entitled 'Abhidhamuladhwani: Asangadhamaya oru sankalppam' have plagiarized ideas from the book 'Rasadhwani Siddhantam Upekshikkuka' published in 2013 by Shooba K.S. He also said that Chattannath Achuthanunni has imitated his sentence structure as well. However, Achuthanunni, who said that he had read Shooba's book only two days ago, clarified that nothing he says in his article is in Shooba's book and doubts that Shooba does not know Sanskrit properly, and added he was not interested in the controversy.

== Personal life ==
Achuthanunni and his wife Aivi lives in his house at Edappal, Malappuram district. The couple have two children, Ashis and Ashwathy.
