= Vaikom Ramachandran =

Indian lyricist (born 1962)

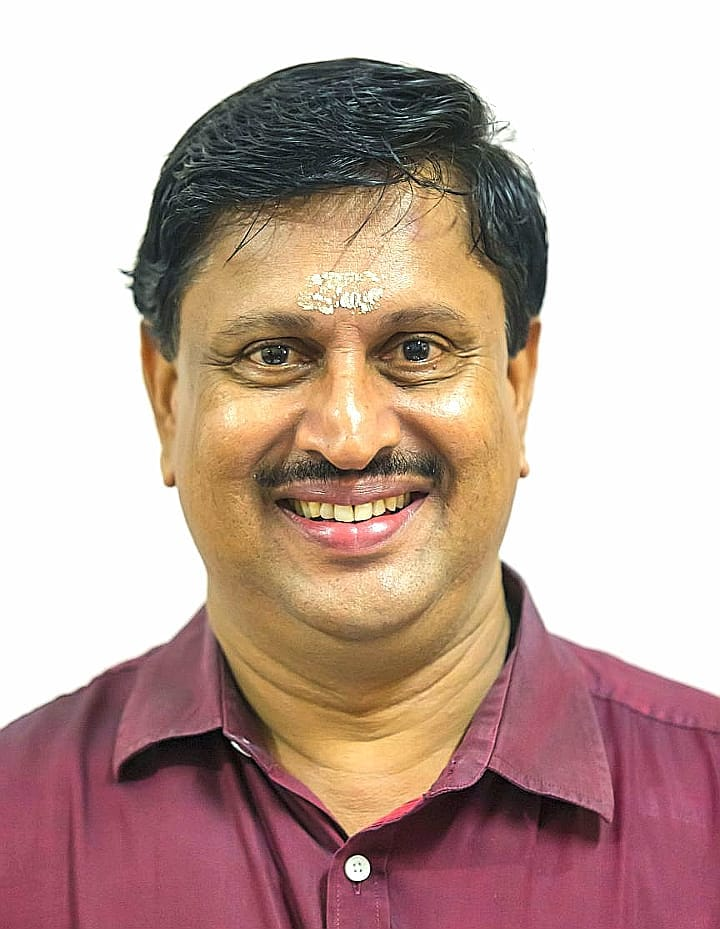
Vaikom Ramachandran

Vaikom Ramachandran (born 3 May 1962) is an Indian Vaikom Ramachandran — Malayalam Poet, Devotional Poet, Lyricist and Author, who writes in Malayalam language. He is the author of Chottanikkara Bhagavathy Suprabhatham, Hariharathmajam, the Unarthpatt (Suprabhatham song)of Sabarimala Ayyappa Swamy. Vaikom Ramachandran received Poonthanam Jnanappana Award of the Guruvayur Devaswom in 2026, which is regarded as one of the highest honours in the field of devotional poetry. The conferment of this revered honour upon Vaikom Ramachandran in February 2026 stands as a defining moment in his illustrious literary journey—a journey deeply rooted in devotion, spirituality, and an enduring love for Malayalam literature.

Since its inception, the prestigious Guruvayur Devaswom honour has been associated with some of the most eminent literary giants of Kerala, to be recognised in the distinguished company of such luminaries is, therefore, an achievement of exceptional significance.

The distinction is further elevated by a remarkable double record: Vaikom Ramachandran became the youngest recipient of this prestigious honour and the first recipient from Kottayam District. This unique achievement not only celebrates his individual contribution as a poet, lyricist, and devotional writer, but also places his name in a distinctive chapter in the history of Guruvayur Devaswom’s literary honours.

Ramachandran has received the Kerala Kshethra Anushtana Kalavedi's Nadasree Award, the Thali Mahadeva Puraskaram, and the Udayanapuram Subrahmanya Swamy Temple Puraskaram. He has composed over 25 Suprabhatham songs (Unarthupattu) for various temples, including the Sree Poornathrayeesa, Sabarimala, and Chottanikkara temples, where his compositions are played daily. He also wrote the inscription installed beneath and behind the Maraprabhu sculpture at Guruvayoor. Known as Bhaktha Kavi (Devotional Poet), he has composed over 200 devotional songs and 1,000 keerthans and bhajans, alongside spiritual articles and kesadipadam works (hymns describing deities from head to toe) such as Harisangamam, Sree Poornathrayeesa Kesadipadam, and Guruvayoorappa Kesadipadam.

== Personal life ==
Vaikom Ramachandran was born to Vasudevan Nair and Leelavathy Amma on 3 May 1962 at Vaikom in Kottayam.Sri Vaikom Ramachandran was a District Supply Officer, and now working as Member of Consumer Dispute Redressal commission, Ernakulam.

== Books ==
- Aarum Parayatha Kadhakal (ആരും പറയാത്ത കഥകൾ) ചെറുകഥാ സമാഹാരം.
- Hrudaya Sopanathile Pranava Manthrangal (ഹൃദയസോപാനത്തിലെ പ്രണവമന്ത്രങ്ങൾ )

Jeevanum Moksha Margavum (ജീവനും മോക്ഷമാർഗ്ഗവും കീർത്തന സമാഹാരം.)

- Aathmapournami (ആത്മപൗർണ്ണമി . കവിതാ സമാഹാരം)
- Janinadanam(ജനിനടനം - കവിതാ സമാഹാരം)
- Padmaharam( പദ്മഹാരം - കീർത്തനങ്ങൾ)

Eeakalochanam (ഏകലോചനം - കവിതാ സമാഹാരം) SreeKrishnapoornamrutham (ശ്രീകൃഷ്ണ പൂർണ്ണാമൃതം - കീർത്തനങ്ങൾ - ഗാനങ്ങൾ - സ്തുതികൾ - സുപ്രഭാത ഗീതങ്ങൾ - ശ്ലോകങ്ങൾ.. എന്നിവയുടെ സമാഹാരം.) Maraprabhuvinte Manthrapeedom (മരപ്രഭുവിന്റെമന്ത്രപീഠം - ഗുരുവായൂരിലെ മരപ്രഭുശില്പത്തിെന്റെനിർമ്മാണ കാലത്തെക്കുറിച്ചുള്ളവിവരണഗ്രന്ഥം )
