= Vaikom =

Vaikom വൈക്കം
- Municipality
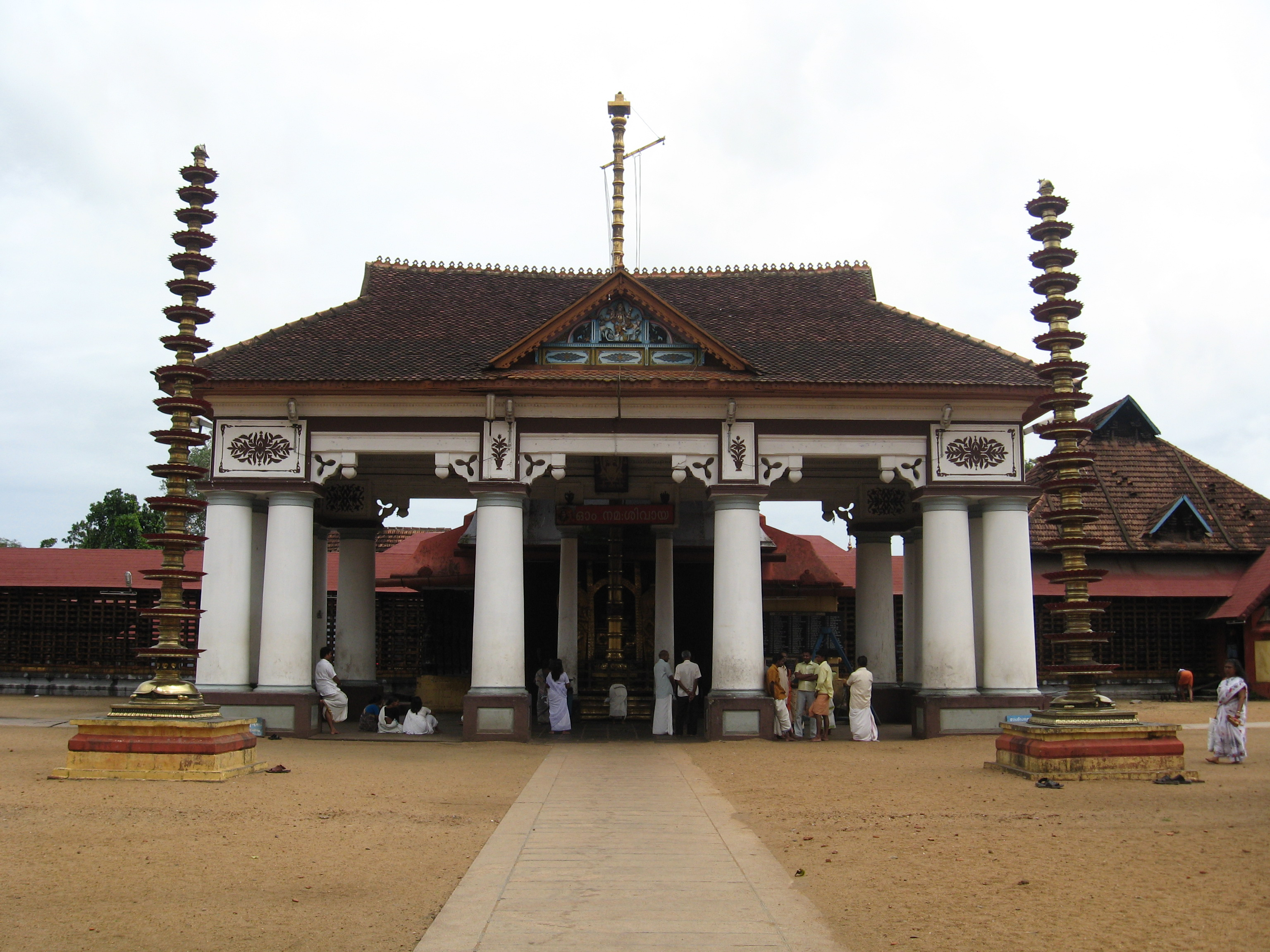
- Vaikom Mahadeva Temple

- Location in Kerala, India Vaikom (India)
- Coordinates: 9°45′00″N 76°23′34″E
- Country: India
- State: Kerala
- District: Kottayam
- Taluk: Vaikom

Government
  - Type: Municipal Council
  - Chairperson: Renuka Ratheesh (INC)
  - Municipal Council: Vaikom Municipal Council

Area
  - Total: 8.73 km^{2} (3.37 sq mi)

Population (2011)
  - Total: 23,234
  - Density: 2,660/km^{2} (6,890/sq mi)

Languages
  - Official: Malayalam, English
- Time zone: UTC+5:30 (IST)
- PIN: 686141
- Telephone code: 04829
- Vehicle registration: KL-36, KL-67
- Nearest cities: Kottayam, Kochi, Alappuzha

Vaikom (IPA: [ʋɐjkʲːɐm]) is a municipality in the Kottayam district of Kerala. It is located 33 km (20.5 mi) north of the district headquarters in Kottayam and about 33 km (20.5 mi) south of Kochi, placing it roughly midway between the two cities. Vaikom is also located about 183 km (113.7 mi) north of the state capital of Thiruvananthapuram. As per the 2011 Indian census, Vaikom has a population of 23,234 people, and a population density of 2,661/km^{2} (6,890/sq mi).

== Location ==
Vaikom is situated at the northwestern end of the Kottayam district, close to the border with the Ernakulam district. Vaikom is a lakeside town situated on the banks of the Vembanad lake similar to other lakeside towns like Kottayam and Changanassery. Its western borders are bound by the Vembanad lake. The Muvattupuzha river has its mouth near Vaikom where it empties into the Vembanad lake, many distributaries of the Muvattupuzha river pass through Vaikom. It is also close to the tourism destination Kumarakom and the city of Kochi. Vaikom is situated on the Ernakulam-Alappuzha-Kottayam border area and it is 33 km from Ernakulam, 33 km from Kottayam via Kumarakom, 39 km from Alappuzha and about 56 km (35 mi) from Kochi International Airport.

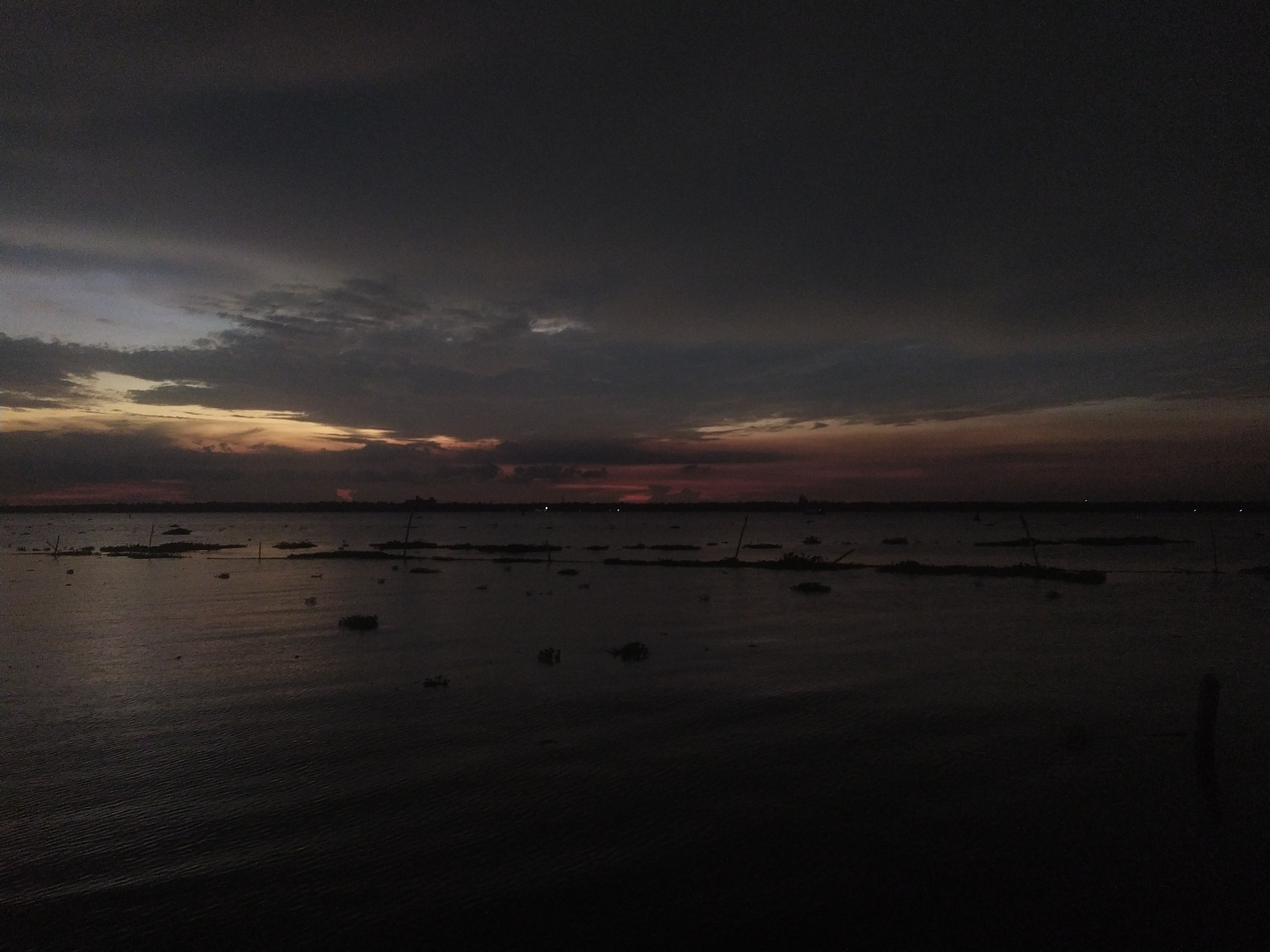
The view from the Vaikom beach, overlooking the Vembanad Lake

== History ==
Vaikom was believed to be a part of a kingdom called Venmalanadu in the past. When Venmalanadu was split into Vadakkumkoor and Thekkumkoor, it became part of Vadakkumkoor dynasty. Vadakkumkoor kingdom spread along the path of Muvattupuzha river towards the north east side from Kaduthuruthy, Vaikom, Piravom, Muvattupuzha, Kothamangalam and Thodupuzha. There was an important port at Chemmanakary, near Vaikom during the Vadakkumkoor era. Later in 1742, it became part of Travancore when the then Maharajah of Travancore, Anizham Thirunal Marthanda Varma, annexed Vadakkumkoor to his kingdom.

Vaikom gained its fame on a national level during the Vaikom Satyagraha.

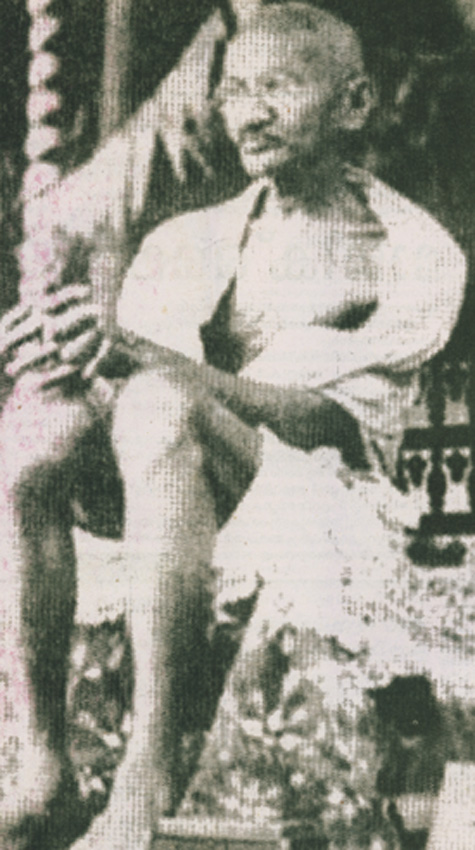
Mahatma Gandhi at Vaikom Satyagraha

== Vaikom Temple ==
The Vaikom Shiva Temple, known as Thekkan Kashi (Southern Kashi), is the centre of the town, and is the site of the Vaikom Ashtami celebrations during November. It is notable as the venue of the Vaikom Agitation for achieving for the lower castes the right to walk on the roads surrounding the temple. One of the most popular temples in Kerala dedicated to Lord Shiva,

== Administration ==
Vaikom is administered by a municipality and is the seat of a munsiff's court (among the oldest to be established in the Kingdom of Travancore, 100 years old). The Vaikom assembly constituency is part of the Kottayam parliamentary constituency.

== Economy ==
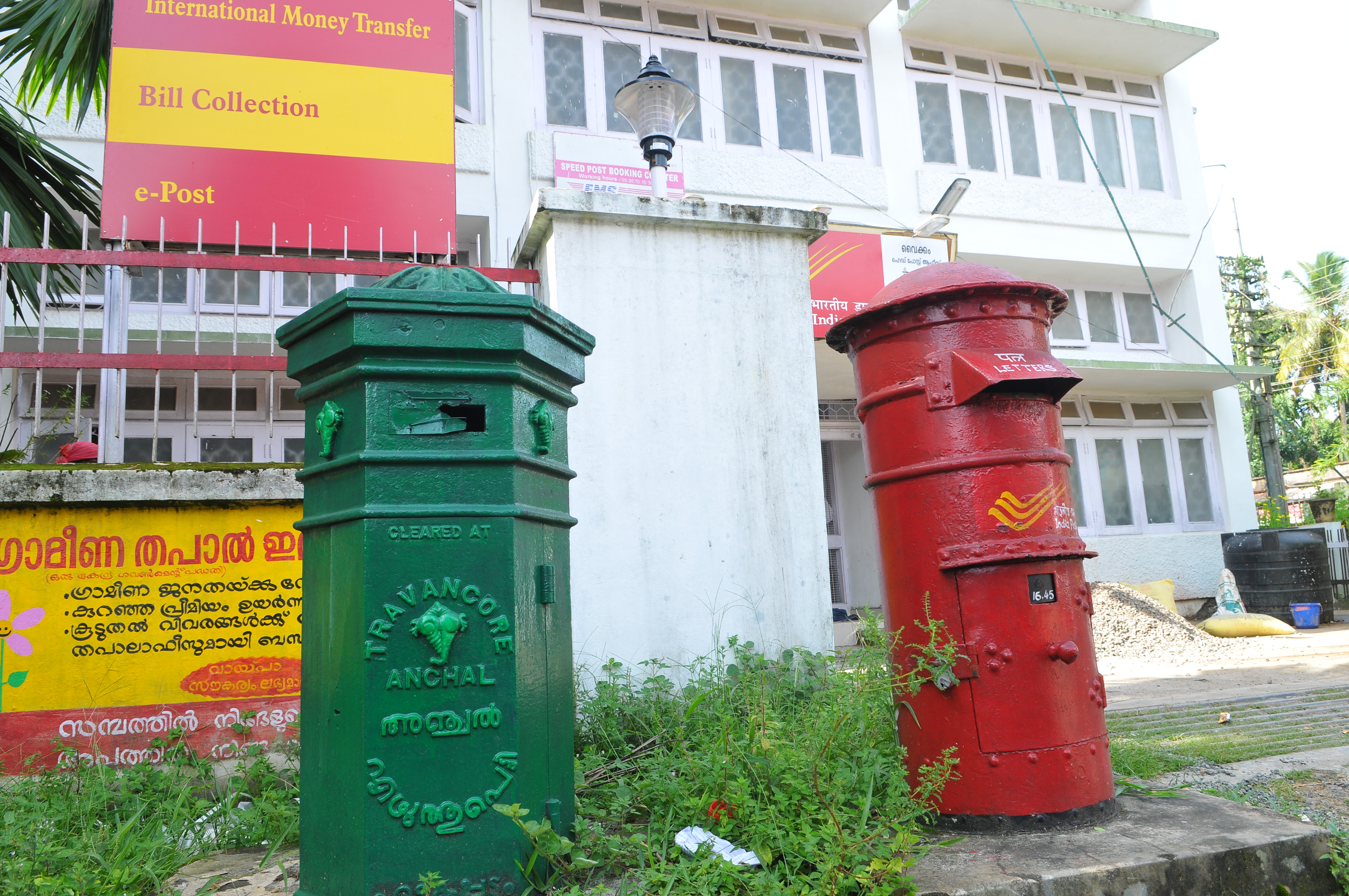
Old and New post box

The traditional economy has been based on coconut, rice crops, and fishing; more recently, crops like nutmeg, black pepper, and latex have been introduced. Tourism and software are pursued as a means to livelihood.

The Kerala Paper Products Limited (Previously called Hindustan Newsprint Limited) is situated in Velloor,17 km (10.6 mi) away from Vaikom.

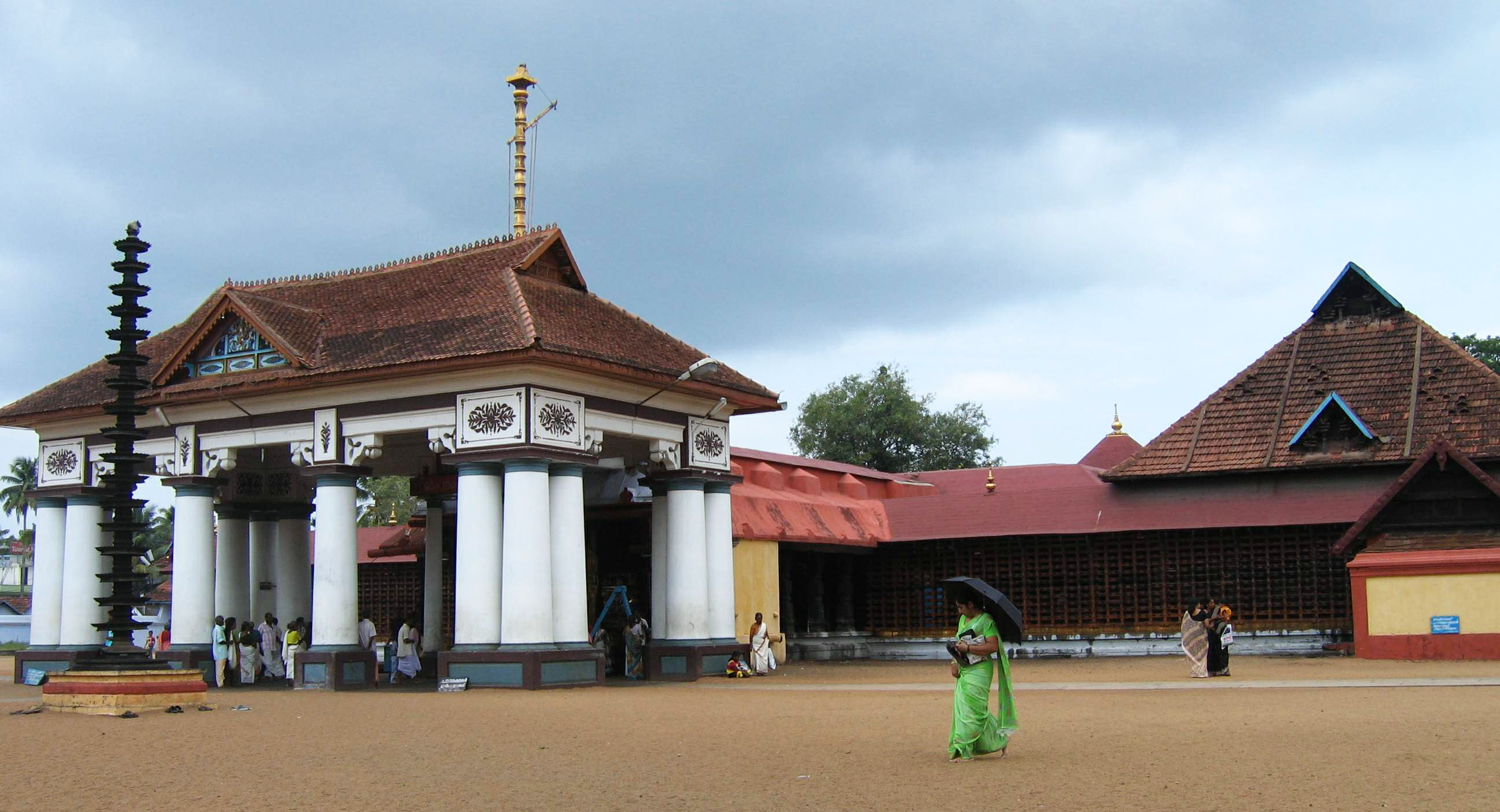
Mahadheva Temple

== Demographics ==
As per the 2001 census, Vaikom has a population of about 22637 (male: 10955; female: 11682). This region has a literacy rate of 92% (male: 97%; female: 90%). Population density of the region is 2496 per square km.

In the 2011 census, the Vaikom municipality had a population of 23,234 of which 11,304 are males while 11,930 were females. The population of children under age 6 was 1807, which was 7.78% of the total population of Vaikom. The female sex ratio in Vaikom municipality is 1055. Vaikom's child sex ratio is almost 960. Vaikom city's literacy rate is 96.84%, higher than the state average of 94.00%. Male literacy is almost 98.30% and female literacy rate is 95.47%.

Hindus are the largest religious community in Vaikom, accounting for 85% of the population. Christians represent 12%, and Muslims 3%.

== Notable people ==
- Justice K. G. Balakrishnan
- Vaikom Muhammad Basheer
- Mammootty, actor
- P. K. Biju
- George Josy
- Cherian K. Cherian
- V. N. Janaki
- Janardhanan, actor
- A. J. John
- Monce Joseph
- M. K. Kamalam
- Abraham Kattumana
- Kalaikkal Kumaran, actor
- Mathew Ulakamthara, poet and literary critic
- N. Mohanan
- Vaikom Chandrasekharan Nair
- N. N. Pillai
- P. Krishna Pillai, leader of the first communist movement in Kerala
- Vaikom Padmanabha Pillai, military officer of the Kingdom of Travancore
- Vaikom Ramachandran, poet
- Sruthy Sithara, model
- Thomas Unniyadan
- Vaikom Vijayalakshmi
- Vaikom Viswan
- S. Ramesan, Malayalam language poet and orator

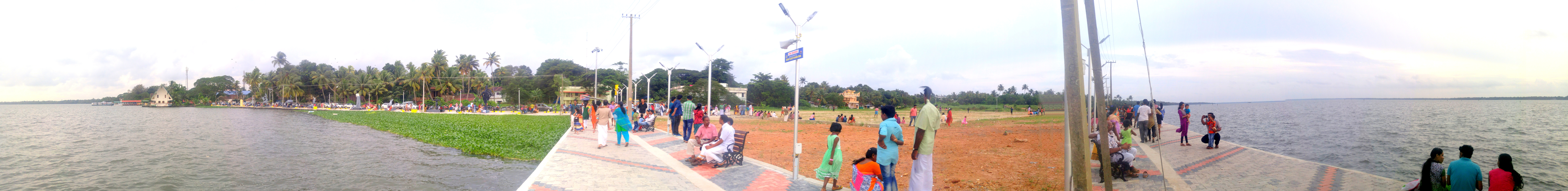
Vembanadu lake, boat jetty, KTDC restaurant, riverside park, and playground.

== See also ==
- Vallakam
- Chempu
