= P. P. Sreedharanunni =

Indian poet

P. P. Sreedharanunni (born 12 April 1944) is a Malayalam–language poet from Kerala state, South India. His collection of poems titled Khshanapathram received the Kerala Sahitya Akademi Award in the year 2005.

He joined as Script Writer in 1969 and retired as Programme Executive in All India Radio, Kozhikode. He also served in Thiruvananthapuram station. He lent his voice as Mahatma Gandhi in the weekly radio programme, 'Gandhimargam', for about three decades.

His poetry collection ''Yakshikalude Parinamam'' was published by Mathrubhumi in 2025.
