= D. Vinayachandran =

Indian poet (1946–2013)

D.Vinayachandran
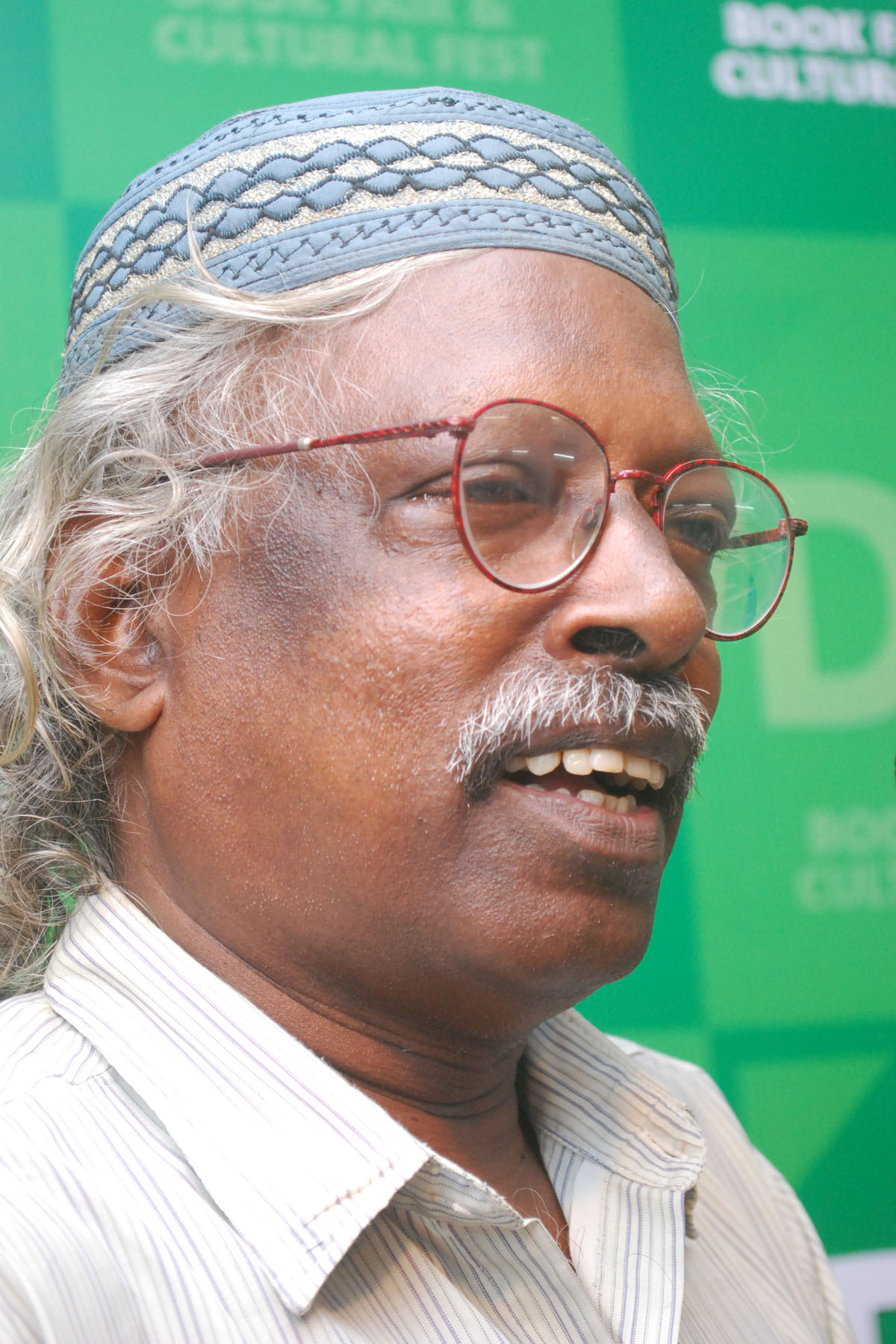
- Born: 13 May 1946; West Kallada, Kollam, Kerala, India
- Died: 11 February 2013 (aged 66); Thiruvananthapuram, Kerala, India
- Occupations: Poet, teacher
- Writing career
- Language: Malayalam
- Notable work: Narakam Oru Premakavitha Ezhuthunnu

D. Vinayachandran (13 May 1946 – 11 February 2013) was an Indian Malayalam poet. He is one of the proponents of modern style of prose in Malayalam poetry. He was born in West Kallada, Kollam district and has worked as a Malayalam professor in various colleges for more than thirty years. He had his early education in schools in and around Kallada. After completing his master's in Malayalam literature from Government Sanskrit College, Pattambi, he entered the collegiate education service as a lecture and worked in various government colleges across Kerala. He joined the faculty of Mahatma Gandhi University, Kottayam, in 1991 and retired from University's School of Letters in 2006.

== Biography ==
Vinayachandran was born on 13 May 1946 at Padinjare kallada in Kollam district. The poet, a Physics graduate, is also a first rank holder of post graduate Malayalam literature. Later he took up teaching and taught Malayalam literature in various government colleges across the state and at the School of Letters at MG University in Kottayam. Although he had retired in 2004, he continued to teach at the school for another year as a visiting faculty.

Vinayachandran broke into the world of poetry, captivated by the sights of coastal Kollam, his native town. He started writing when Malayalam literature was entering the era of modernity. But his work stood out for its fusion of tradition and modernity, as a medium for powerfully conveying to the reader intense emotions and experiences that dominate the inner self. Though he trod the modern path in choice of themes and narrative techniques, his poems are known for their folk touch and musical quality. Nature was very much the central theme of his poems. He had an enduring love of forests, lakes and nature in general. One of his better known works was Narakam Oru Premakathayezhuthunnu (A Love Story Titled Hell). Veettilekkulla Vazhi, Samsatha Keralam PO, Disa Soochi are some of the poems that brought him rave reviews and cemented his position as a pioneer in prose poetry in Malayalam. Vinayachandran, who has several collections to his credit, won many laurels and awards namely the Kerala Sahitya Akademi Award in 1992, Changampuzha Award, Pandalam Kerala Varma Kavitha Award (2008), Asan Smaraka Kavita Puraskaram, among others.

Vinayachandran died on 11 February 2013 at the age of 66 in a private hospital in Thiruvananthapuram. Vinayachandran, who was suffering from various ailments for the last few months, was admitted to a private hospital two days back by his friends, who found him in a weak condition in his residence, complaining of respiratory trouble and uneasiness. He was unmarried.

== Awards ==
- 2006: Asan Memorial Literary Prize
- 1992: Kerala Sahitya Akademi Award for Narakam Oru Premakavitha Ezhuthunnu'
- Muscat Kerala Cultural Centre Award
- Changampuzha Award, Pandalam Keralavarma Award

== Selected bibliography ==
=== Poetry ===
- Vinayachandran.D (1980). Podichi (in Malayalam).
- Vinayachandran, D. (1981). Vamsagada (in Malayalam). By author.
- Vinayachandran, D. (1991). Narakam Oru Premakavitha Ezhuthunnu (in Malayalam). Kottayam: SPCS.
- Vinayachandran, D. (1992). Disasoochi (in Malayalam). Kozhikode: Bodhi.
- Vinayachandran, D. (1992). Veettilekkulla Vazhi (in Malayalam). Kottayam: DC Books.
- Vinayachandran, D. (1993). Bhoomiyude Nattellu. Kozhikode: Mulberry Books.
- D, Vinayachandran (1995). Kayikkarayile Kadal (in Malayalam). Current Books.
- Vinayachandran, D. (1995). Perariyatha Maranga (in Malayalam). Kottayam: DC Books.
- Vinayachandran, D. (1996). Uparikunnu (in Malayalam). Kottayam: DC Books.
- D, Vinayachandran (1999). Samasthakeralam P.O. (in Malayalam). Kottayam: DC Books.
- Vinayachandran, D. (2007). Chirappu. Kottayam: DC Books.
- Vinayachandran, D. (2010). Ooru chuttunna Pranayam (in Malayalam). Thiruvananthapuram: Kalam.
- Vinayachandran, D. (2010). Vela Kavunni Dhigambara Kavithakal (in Malayalam). Thiruvananthapuram: Kalam.
- Vinayachandran, D. (2010). Madananum Ramananum Tholurummi (in Malayalam). Kottayam: DC Books.
- Sauhrudam
- Vinayachandrante Pranaya Kavithakal
- Varavu ('Advent' in English)

=== Memoirs ===
- Vinayachandran, D. (2011). Anubhavam ormma Yathra (in Malayalam). Kozhikode: Olive Books.
