= K. P. Sudheera =

Indian Malayalam language writer and translator

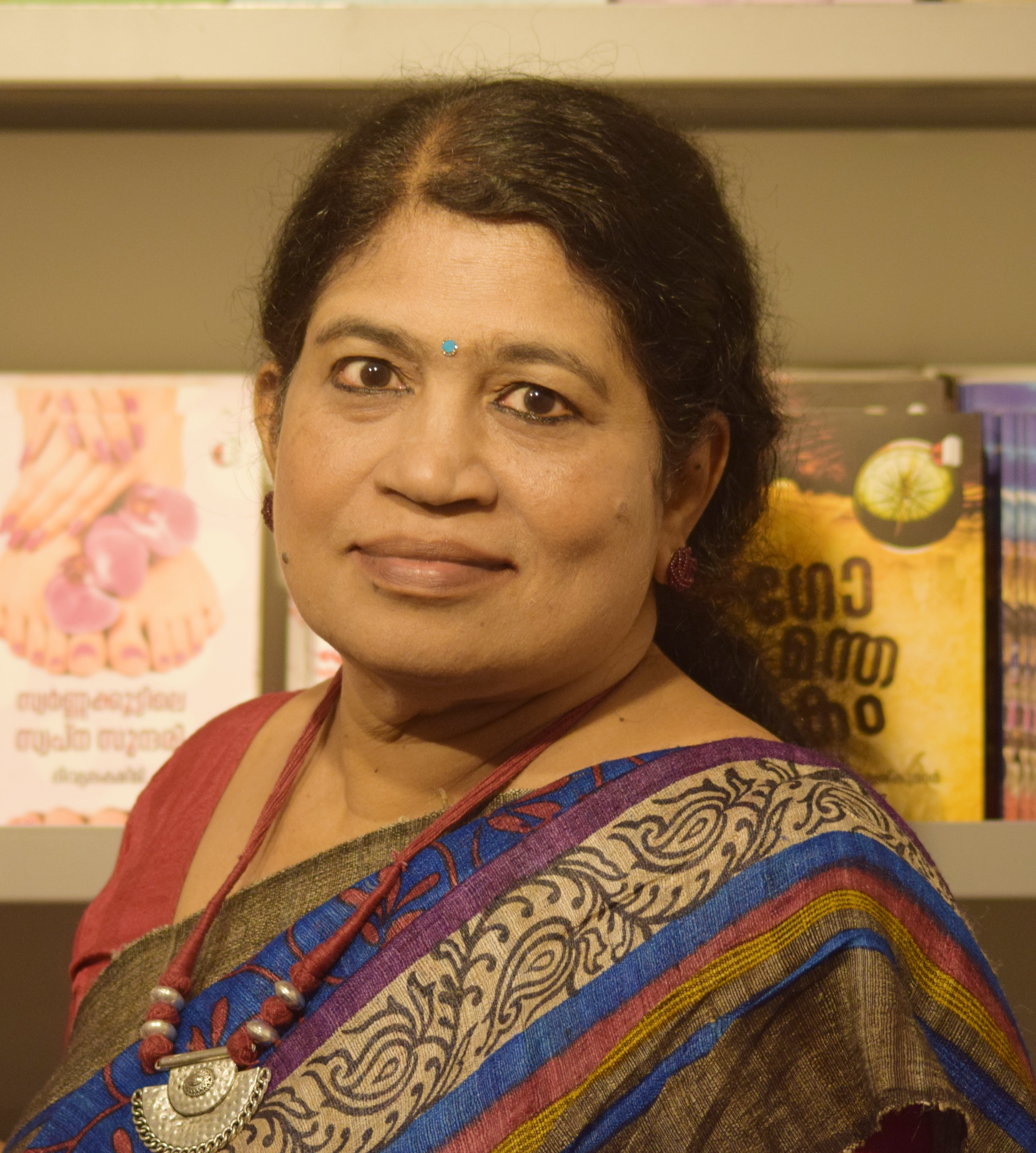
- Sudheera in 2017
- Born: 1958 (age 67–68); Kozhikode district, Kerala, India
- Occupations: Writer, translator
- Spouse: T. M. Raghunath (late)
- Children: Amith, Athul
- Parent(s): K. C. Padmanabhan; Sarada
- Writing career
- Notable awards: Kerala Sahitya Akademi Award for Overall Contributions

Kalathil Padmanabhan Sudheera is a Malayalam language writer from Kerala, India. She has published 101 works in various genres, including novels, poetry, travelogues, biographies, memoirs, translations, letters, and children's literature. Many of her works have been translated to Hindi, Telugu, Tamil and Kannada languages. Kerala Sahitya Akademi has honoured Sudheera in 2022 awarding her Kerala Sahitya Akademi Award for Overall Contributions.

== Biography ==
K. P. Sudheera was born on 1958, at Kalathil house in Puthiyara, Kozhikode, the daughter of K. C. Padmanabhan and Sarada. Sudheera's father's Tharavad is situated in Chavakkad, near Guruvayur, Thrissur district. After studying in BEM Girls' High School, Kozhikode, she received her Bachelor's Degree in Zoology from Govt. Arts & Science College and Providence College. She is currently the manager of North Malabar Gramin Bank, Regional Division, Kozhikode. T. M. Raghunath(Late), Retd. Superintendent, Provident Fund Office, Kozhikode is her husband and they have two children, Amit and Atul. Now, Sudheera and her family live in their house Visranthi in Kozhikode.

Sudheera, who started writing at a young age, won a prize in an all-Kerala story competition while studying in college. Later, after joining in Gramin Bank, she became more active in writing. Renowned writer and literary critic M. Krishnan Nair wrote a very good comment about a story of her published at that time, that was her inspiration to write more. She has published 80 books in various genres, including novels, poetry, travelogues, biographies, memoirs, translations, letters, and children's literature. Many of her works have been translated to Hindi, Telugu, Tamil and Kannada languages.

Prabhakaran Hebbar Illam received the award Balakrishna Goenka Anoodith Sahitya Puraskaram for his Hindi translation of K. P. Sudheera's Ganga.

== Selected works ==
=== Short story collections ===
- Ente Pranayakathakal. Mathrubhumi Books. 2019. ISBN 9788182679740.
- Pranaya Dooram. Saikatham Books. 2018. ISBN 9789388343169.
- Aakaasachaarikal. Kottayam: Current Books. 1996.
- Atheetham. Kottayam: Current Books. 2001. ISBN 978-81-240-1086-0.
- Neelakkadambu. Thiruvananthapuram: Chintha Publishers. 2013. ISBN 978-93-82808-42-8.
- Sudheera, K. P (2011). Pranayam madhuram: kathakal. Kozhikode: Mathrubhumi Books. ISBN 978-81-8265-225-5.
- Sudheerayude Kathakal. Kozhikode: Mathrubhumi Books. 2008. ISBN 978-81-8264-616-2.
- Pranayanantharam. Kozhikode: Lipi Publications. 2013. ISBN 978-8188016624.
- Pranayam Madhuram. Kozhikode: Mathrubhumi Books. 2011. ISBN 9788182652255.
- Pi Sudhīra, Ke (2000). Cholamarangalillatha Vazhi. K.P. Sudheera. ISBN 812400854X.
- Aaro Oral. Kozhikode: Poorna Publications. 2005. ISBN 813000240X.
- Snehasparsangal. 1999.
- Neelakkadampu. Thrissur: Green Books. 2007.
- Varthamanathinte Urappukal. Kozhikode: Haritham Books. 2010.
- Atheetham
- Sahayathrika

=== Novels ===
- Nashta Smruthiyude Kalam. H&C Books. 2020. ISBN 9789388952347.
- Moonnu Pranaya Novelettukal. Olive Books. 2018. ISBN 9789387334113.
- Swargavathil. Mathrubhumi Books. 2017. ISBN 9788182674127.
- Pranayasameere. Kozhikode: Mathrubhumi Books. 2013. ISBN 978-81-8265-594-2.
- Ajeevanantham. Kottayam: DC Books. 2007. ISBN 978-8124016763.
- Ganga. Kozhikode: Poorna Publications. 2007.
- Pranaya Sameere. Kottayam: Mathrubhumi Books. 2011. ISBN 9788182650510.
- Smruthi. Kottayam: DC Books. 2011. ISBN 9788126431229.
- Nashtasmruthiyude Kalam. Thrissur: H&C Books. 2019. ISBN 9789388952347.

=== Children's literature ===
- Pralayakalam. Poorna Publications. 2018. ISBN 9788130021232.
- Bluewhale. Saikatham Books. 2017. ISBN 9789386222527.
- Mittuvum Minnuvum. Haritham Books. 2017. ISBN 9788192827285.
- Oru Kuragu Kathayum Sagara Sundariyum. Haritham Books. 2017. ISBN 9788192827278.
- Kudilum Kottaravum. Kozhikode: Vachanam Books. 2010.
- Kunjolu. Kerala State Institute of Children's Literature. 2021. ISBN 9789388935944.
- Jeevanakala

=== Biography ===
- SPB Pattinte Kadalazham (2 ed.). Kerala Book Store Publishers. 2021. ISBN 9788195348343.. Based on life of S. P. Balasubrahmanyam.
- Iqbal: jeevasparshanagalude kathalum karuthum. Kozhikode: Olive Publications. 2003. ISBN 8187474122.
- Khalil gibran anaswarathayude rahasyam. Olive Publications. 2007.

=== Poetry collection ===
- Pranaya Nombarangal. Saikatham Books. 2017. ISBN 9789382909798.
- Pranayamarmarangal. Mathrubhumi Books. 2015. ISBN 9788182664364.
- Theeravishappu. Sahithya Pravarthaka Co-operative Society. 2012. ISBN 9789382654599.

=== Memoirs ===
- Ormakalude Album. National Book Stall. 2016. ISBN 9789386094117.
- Anuraga paragangal (editor). Kairali Books. 2017. ISBN 9789386822307.
- Snehathinte mukhangal: anusmarana lekhanangal. Kozhikode: Pappiyon. 2002.

=== translations ===
- Pranayadhooth (First ed.). Kozhikode: Mathrubhumi Books. 2020. ISBN 9789390574230.. Adaptation of Meghadūta by Kalidasa.
- Gibran, Khalil; Sudheera, K. P (2007). Gibrante pranaya lekhanangal. Thiruvananthapuram: Chintha Publishers.
- Steinbeck, John; Sudheera, K. P. (2011). Krodhathinte munthirippazhangal. Kottayam: D C Books. ISBN 978-81-264-3294-3.

=== Travelogues ===
- Anubhavam, Orma, yathra. Olive Books. 2019. ISBN 9789389325119.
- Piramidukalude Naattil. Kozhikode: Mathrubhumi Books. 2013. ISBN 978-81-8265-674-1.
- Manthari muthal mahakaasam vare. Thrissur: Kerala Sahithya Akademi. 2011. ISBN 9788176901864.
- Thamarappookkalum Neelaneeharangalum. Kozhikode: Lead Publications.

=== Article collection ===
- Snehathinte Mukhangal

== Awards ==
=== International level awards ===
- Dubai Art Lovers Association Award
- Jeddah Arangu Award
- Lingual Harmony Award, London
- Daughter of Nile, Egypt
- Woman of the Era Award, Tashkent
- Lady of the Time Award, Dubai
- Daughter of Himalaya Award, Nepal
- Sangamitra of the Age Award, Sri Lanka
- Minarva of East Award, Saint Petersburg

=== National level awards and awards from other states ===
- 2015: Akka Maha Devi literary Award
- Delhi Sahithya Academy Award
- Bijapur Taj Muglini Award
- Gayathri Award
- Mirabai Award (Delhi)
- Kasthurba Samman
- Sriman Aravind Ashram Award (Assam)

=== State level and other awards ===
- Kamala Surayya Award by Kerala government
- Lalithambika Antharjanam Award for young writers
- Mathrubhumi Grihalakshmi Award for Best Short Story (twice)
- Kesari Balakrishna Pillai Award
- Uroob Award
- Aksharam Vaikom Muhammad Basheer Award
- Arangu Award
- Anveshi's Literary Award
- Kodamana Award
- Manaseva Puraskaram instituted in the name of Chatampi Swamikal
- Dharmeekatha – Excellency Award
- Kala Kairali Award
- Thakazhi Award
- Literary competition organized by OV Vijayan Memorial Committee on the occasion of the Golden Jubilee of Khasakkinte Itihasam, prize in poetry.
- Kerala Sahitya Akademi Award for Overall Contributions for the year in 2022
