= Edasseri Govindan Nair =

Indian poet and critic

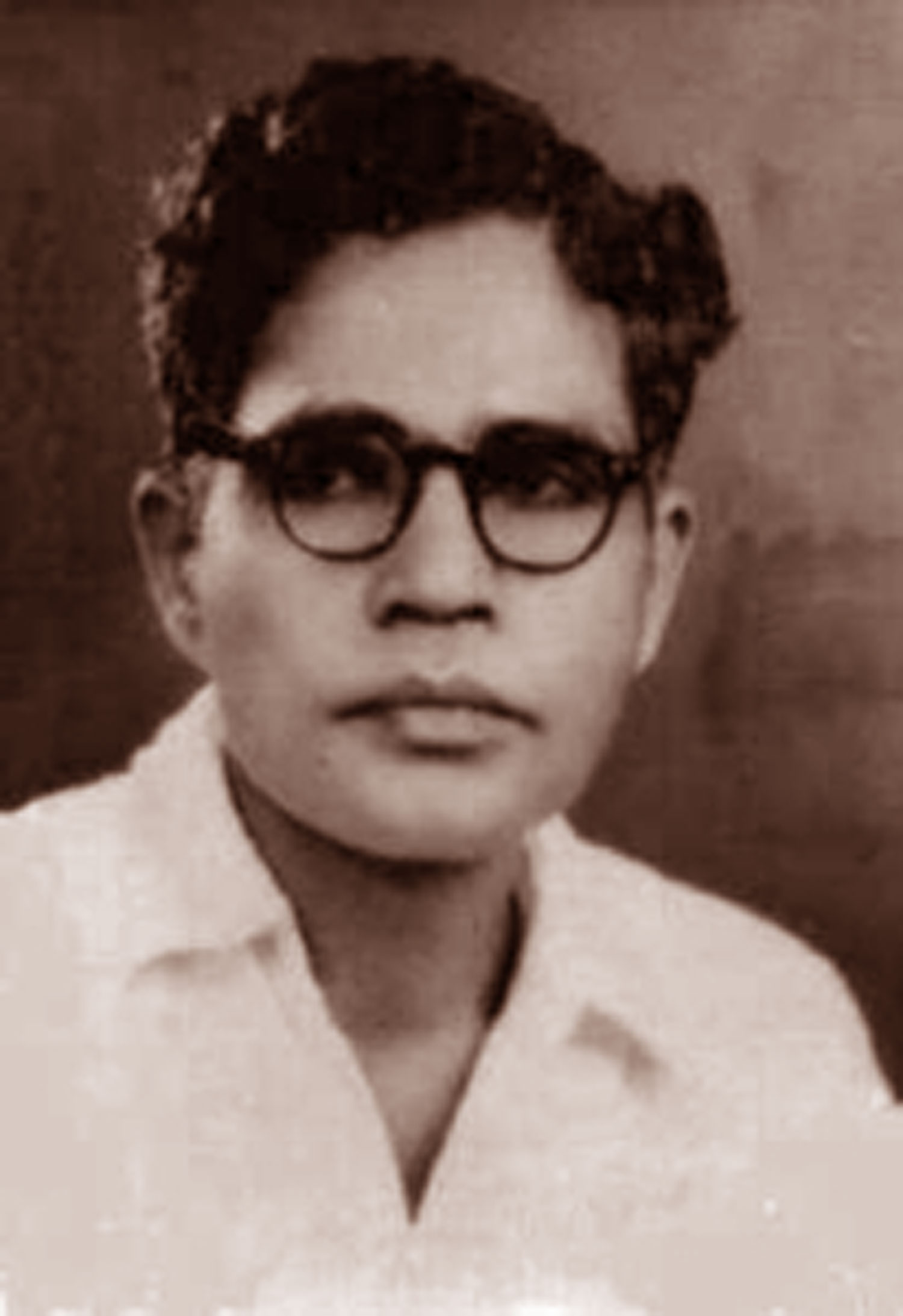
- Edasseri Govindan Nair, c. 1953
- Born: 23 December 1906; Kuttippuram, Malabar district, Madras Presidency, British India
- Died: 16 October 1974 (aged 67); Cochin, Kerala, India
- Other name: "Shakthiyude Kavi"
- Occupations: Poet, playwright
- Spouse: Janaki Amma
- Children: E. Harikumar, E Madhavan.
- Relatives: P. Krishna Kurup (father); Kunjukutti Amma (mother)
- Writing career
- Pen name: Edasseri
- Genres: Poetry, plays
- Notable awards: Sahitya Akademi Award; Kerala Sahitya Akademi Award for Poetry; Asan Smaraka Kavitha Puraskaram
- Website: website

Edasseri Govindan Nair (23 December 1906 – 16 October 1974) was an Indian poet and playwright of Malayalam literature. Known as one of the major poets of Malayalam, Edasseri was a recipient of the Sahitya Akademi Award and the Kerala Sahitya Akademi Award for Poetry. He was also a recipient of Asan Smaraka Kavitha Puraskaram, which was awarded posthumously.

== Biography ==
I too had a mother
When a King bought me, a slave,
She was given a price, a few coins
She tied them to my apron-strings
And left bare-handed
I bought a blanket, later
To protect her from cold
Alas! When I came with the gift at last
She had gone for eternal rest
Under the cover of a thick earthen blanket.
Excerpts from King Bimbisaran's Shepherd, translated by M. Leelavathi

Edasseri Govindan Nair was born on 23 December 1906 at Kuttippuram, in Malapuram district in the south Indian state of Kerala to P. Krishna Kurup and Edasseri Kunjukutti Amma in a family with poor financial means. (Note: Edasseri was the family name of his mother, obtained through matrilineal succession) Govindan got his family name, Edasseri, through matrilineal succession.

He did not have much formal education due to the death of his father in 1921 when he was only 15 years old and started his career early as an assistant to a relative, who worked in Alappuzha. However, he compensated for the lack of formal education with hard work with voracious reading, learning Sanskrit and English on his own taking help from his friends, constantly engaging in debates on literature, criticism, science, astronomy and even astrology. He spent 7 years in Alleppey before moving to Kozhikode. In early 1930, he moved to Ponani. It was during this time that he married Janaki Amma, the wedding taking place in 1938. He continued with his learning, debates and discussions in Ponani also.

Edasseri was associated with various literary and cultural forums. He sat in the general council of Kerala Sahitya Akademi, Kerala Sangeetha Nataka Akademi and Samastha Kerala Sahitya Parishad and was a member of the board of directors of the Sahithya Pravarthaka Co-operative Society. He presided Kerala Sahithya Samithi and Kendra Kala Samithi during various periods and was instrumental in founding a local library, Krishna Panikkar Vayana Sala.

Edasseri's works include 19 books and over 300 poems in 10 anthologies, 6 books of plays and a collection of essays. He was among the poets who changed the romantic traits of Malayalam poetry to realism. His narrative style, as shown in his poems such as Poothapattu, Panimudakkam, Kalyana Pudava, Karutha Chettichikal and Kavile Pattu, was reported to reflect strong humanism.

Govindan Nair - Janaki Amma couple had eleven children, though only eight survived infancy. He died on 16 October 1974, at the age of 67.

== Awards ==
Edasseri received two awards from the Government of Tamil Nadu (the known as Government of Madras), the first one for his play, Koottukrishi and the other, for his poem anthology, Puthan Kalavum Arivalum. He received the Kerala Sahitya Akademi Award for Poetry in 1969 for the poem anthology Oru Pidi Nellikka and a year later, Sahitya Akademi awarded him their annual award for 1969 for Kavile Pattu, another of his anthology. He was awarded Asan Smaraka Kavitha Puraskaram posthumously in 1979, five years after his death, for the anthology, Anthithiri.

== Literary works ==
=== Poem anthologies ===
- Alakavali (Ornations)(അളകാവലി) -1940
- Puthankalavum Arivalum Poothappattum (പുത്തൻ കലവും അരിവാളും പൂതപ്പാട്ടും)(New Pot and Sickle) - 1951
- Laghu Ganangal (Simple Songs) - 1954
- Karutha Chettichikal (Dark Nomad Women) - 1955
- Thathwa Shastrangal Urangumbol (As Philosophies Sleep) -1961
- Kavile Pattu (Song of the Grove) - 1966
- Oru Pidi Nellikka (A handful of Gooseberries) - 1968
- Thrivikramannu Munnil (In front of Thrivikrama) - 1971
- Kunkuma Prabhatham (The Vermilion Dawn) - 1975
- Anthithiri (Ritual Wick of Dusk) – 1977
- Edasseriyude Sampoorna Kavithakal (Complete Poetic Works of Edasseri) - 1988
- Malayalathinte Priya Kavithakal (Endearing poems of Malayalam) - 2013.

=== Plays ===
- Noolamala (The Entanglement) -1947
- Koottu Krishi (Co-operative Farming) - 1950
- Kaliyum Chiriyum (Fun and Laughter) - One-act plays- 1954
- Ennichutta Appam ( Limited Means) - One-act plays- 1957
- Chaliyathi (The Weaver Woman) - One-act plays- 1960
- Njediyil Padaratha Mulla (Jasmine Vine that does not climb the prop) - 1964
- Jarasandhante Puthri (Daughter of Jarasandhan) - Radio Play- 1970s
- Khatolkachan 1970s
- Edasseriyude Naadakangal - 2001

=== Other books ===
- Edasseriyude Prabandhangal (Essays of Edasseri) - 1988
- Edasseriyude Cherukathakal (Short stories of Edasseri) – 2015

== Books on Edasseri Govindan Nair ==
- Edasseri - Navabhavukathwathinte Kavi (Literary criticism by Prof. P. Meerakutty)
- Edasseri Govindan Nair (book in English on the poet by M. Leelavathi)
- Edasseriyude Kavyalokam (book on Edasseri poems by K. P. Saraschandran)
- Itha Oru Kavi (essays on Edasseri by eminent writers)
- Edasserikkavitha - Shilpavicharam by K. P. Mohanan (Note: The book received the Kerala Sahitya Akademi Award for Literary Criticism in 2007)
- Edasserikkavitha - a collection of essays by various writers compiled by Kavadayar Ramachandran
- Edasseri Ninavil Varumpol - (Essays on Edasseri)
- Edasserikkavitha (Literary criticism by Melath Chandrasekharan)
- Edasserikavithayile Premeyaghatana (Literary criticism by Chathanath Achuthanunni)
