= Madhavan Ayyappath =

Indian writer (1934 - 2021)

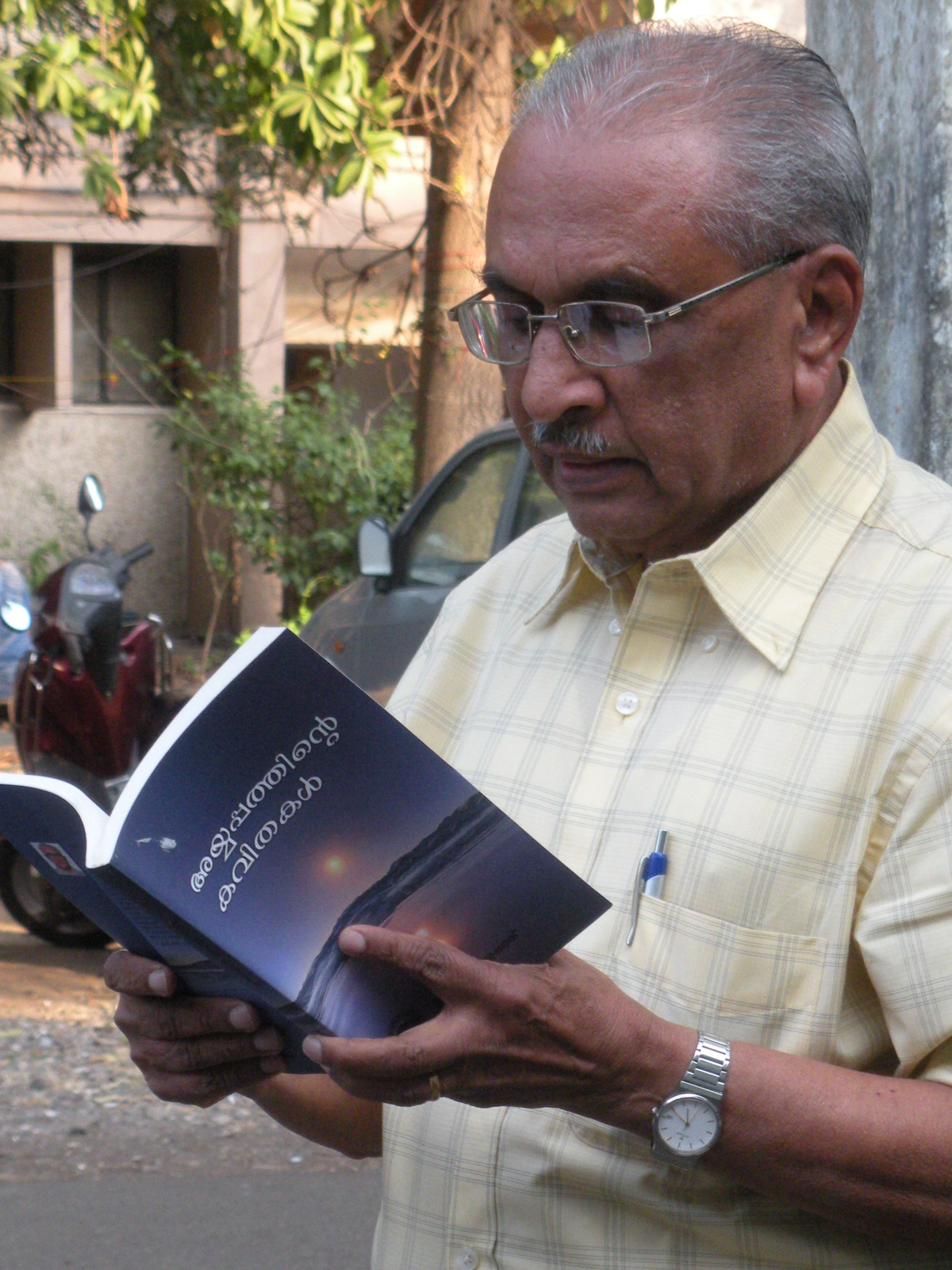
- Ayyappath in 2014
- Born: 24 April 1934; Kunnamkulam, British Raj
- Died: 25 December 2021 (aged 87); Kottappuram, Thrissur, Kerala, India

Madhavan Ayyappath (24 April 1934 – 25 December 2021) was an Indian poet and translator from the south state of Kerala. He was a recipient of the Kerala Sahitya Akademi Award.

== Biography ==
Madhavan Ayyappath was born in 1934 in Chowannur, near Kunnamkulam, in Thrissur district, son of Ayyappath Lakshmikkutty Amma and Peringode Karumathil Ramunni Nair.

He obtained a BA degree in Economics from Madras University and did his Master's degree in English literature. He was a civil servant, and worked for the Government of India until 1992.

Madhavan was married to T. C. Ramadevi, and was the father of Sanjay and Manjima. He died on 25 December 2021, Christmas Day, at the age of 87 after collapsing in an apartment in Kuttappuram.

== Works ==
- Jivacharitra Kurippukal
- Kilimozhikal
- Sri Narayana Guru (English)
- Dharmapatham (Translation)

== Awards ==
- 1988: Kerala Sahitya Akademi Award for Kilimozhikal
- 2003: Aasan Prize
