= Pulakkattu Raveendran =

Indian poet

Pulakkattu Raveendran (30 January 1932 – 21 June 1995) was a Malayalam–language poet from Kerala state, South India. His anthology of poems titled Pulakkattu Raveendrante Kavithakal received the Kerala Sahitya Akademi Award in the year 1990. His other works include Nakshatra Paragam, Pravasam and Swakshetram.
