= Kunhikuttan Thampuran =

Indian poet (1864–1913)

Rama Varma (1864 – 1913), known by his pen name Kunhikuttan Thampuran and popularly known as Kerala Vyasan, meaning Vyasan of Kerala, was an Indian poet from Kodungallur, Kingdom of Travancore. The son of Venmani Achan Nampoothiripad and Kunchipilla Thampurati, he was a member of the royal family.

== Published works ==
- Kavibharatam (1893)
- Thuppalkolambi (1910)
- Kamson (1911)
- Palulli Charitham (1925)
- Ratnapanchakam
