= Sree Neelakanta Government Sanskrit College, Pattambi =

SNGS College, Pattambi
- Type: Public
- Established: 1899; 127 years ago
- Accreditation: NAAC A+
- Affiliations: University of Calicut
- Location: Pattambi, Kerala, 679303, India; 10.809°N 76.199°E
- Campus: Rural
- Language: English
- Website: sngscollege.org

Sree Neelakanta Government Sanskrit College, Pattambi, abbreviated as SNGS, is a NAAC A+ graded government college located in Pattambi of Palakkad district in Kerala, India. It is recognised as a Centre of Excellence in the field of higher education by the Government of Kerala.

== History ==
The college was founded by renowned Sanskrit scholar Punnasseri Nambi Neelakanta Sharma. The college initially started as a Sanskrit school in 1899 and was upgraded to the 'Central Sanskrit College' for training for Vidwan and Siromani titles under the University of Madras in 1911. Later the college accredited under University of Calicut.

== Academic programmes ==
SNGC offers eleven undergraduate, six postgraduate and four research programmes in arts, science and commerce through sixteen departments, affiliated to the University of Calicut.

== Notable alumni ==
- Kuttikrishna Marar
- P. Kunhiraman Nair
- K. P. Narayana Pisharody
- P. P. Sumod
- Shafi Parambil
