= Nellikkal Muraleedharan =

Malayalam writer

- Born: T.R Muraleedharan Nair; 1 December 1948; Pathanamthitta District, Kerala, India
- Died: 25 April 2010 (aged 61)
- Occupations: Poet, writer and critic
- Years active: 1977–2010 (Poet)

Nellickal Muraleedharan (1948–2010) was an Indian Malayalam-language poet and writer. He won the poetry category of the Kerala Sahitya Academi in 2004. He won the Edassery Memorial award in 1985. He also won the State Bank of Travancore Award, the Poonthanam award, and the K.C Chacko Award.

== Personal life ==
Muraleedharan was born in the village of Nellickal in Pathanamthitta district, Kerala State, on 2 December 1948. His official name was T.R. Muraleedharan Nair. He was the eldest son of T. Raghavan Pillai and P.P. Thankamma. He expressed his attachment to his parents in his poetry. In his childhood he played on the shores of the river Pamba, later writing many poems about it. He attended various schools in Pathanamthitta. He was married to Sukhada Devi K., who worked as a school principal. They had three daughters together.

== Education and academic career ==
He completed a Master of Arts in Malayalam at Mahatma Gandhi University and worked as a lecturer in various colleges from 1977. He took a PhD in 1991 and then became a research guide. He later joined Sree Sankaracharya Sanskrit University, Kalady, as a professor in Malayalam. He later became Head of the Department of Malayalam, continuing in that role until he retired on 30 April 2009.

== Writing career ==
Muraleedharan published his collection Viroopante Pattu in 1976. He began to receive notice in the world of Malayalam poetry in the 1980s. His poem 'Veedu' (house) received attention from other poets. He won his first 'Edassery Award' in 1985 for his collection, Purappad. His other poetry collections included Atmapuranum (1986), Kilivathil (1988), Baligatha (1991), Chitha Kadakunna Pakshikal (1992), Bodhisatvante Jenmangal (1994), Nellickal Muraleedharante Kavithaakal, Nellickal Muraleedharante Kavithaakal - Volume 2, Keralathile Jaathivyavstha, Aranmula Vallamkali, and Vishwasaahithya darshanangal. A selected volume, Veedu, was published with a music CD containing eight of his most noted poems.

In 2004, his collection Nellickal Muraleedharante Kavithaakal (poems of Nellickal Muraleedharan) won the poetry category of the Kerala Saahitya Academy Award for outstanding books of literary merit by Malayalam writers. He also won a number of other awards, including the State Bank of Travancore Award for Paandi, the K.C Chacko Award, and the Poonthanam Award for poetry.

In addition to poetry, he published a novel Nagarapuranum, in 1981. In 1993, he published a dictionary of literary terms, Sahitya Sabdakaram, which received a number of awards and became a reference book for all Malayalam M.A. students. He also wrote drama, including Poocha Sanyasi, a musical that was directed and aired by Doordarshan [Malayalam].

He compiled an anthology of Malayalam poetry in 1983, Thiranjedutha Naveena Kavithakal.
