= Cherian K. Cherian =

Indian poet

Cherian K.Cherian (born 24 October 1932 (kottayam, vikom)) is a Malayalam–language poet from Kerala state, South India. His collection of poems titled Cheriyan K. Cheriyante Thiranjedutha Kavithakal received the Kerala Sahitya Akademi Award in the year 2007. His other works include Pavizhapputtu, Airavatham, Kushanum Lavanum Kuchelanum and Bhranthanum Bhasmasuranum. His oeuvre also includes numerous Haiku poems in Malayalam.

Born in 1932 in Vaikom in Kottayam district of present-day Kerala, he completed his education from Kerala University and Calcutta University. He taught English language at a school in Vadavukodu for a few years and then worked in the Publication Division of the Ministry of Commerce. He was the assistant editor of Malayala Manorama newspaper. From 1973 onwards, he worked in the child protective services of Government of New York City.
