= Punnasseri Nambi Neelakanta Sharma =

Indian academic

Punnasseri Nambi Neelakanta Sharma (1858–1934) was a Sanskrit scholar and teacher in British India. He was born on 17 June 1858 in Pattambi in Palakkad district to a Moosad family, Narayanan Nambi and Achuthath Nangayya Antharjanam. He learned Sanskrit in the customary way and mastered the branches of traditional knowledge of Vyakaranam (grammar), Alankaram (aesthetics), Vaidyam (medicine) and Jyothisham (astrology).

In 1888 he started 'Saraswathodyothini' a center for Sanskrit teaching which later became Sree Neelakanta Government Sanskrit College Pattambi. He also founded 'Vijnanachinthamani' printing press and 'Vijnanachinthamani' hospital. He received various titles and honours from the Maharajas of Travancore and Cochin states and chaired many academic bodies.

He died on 14 September 1934.

== Major works ==
- Jyothisasthra Subodhini
- Panchabodha vyakhya
- Prasnamargathinu uparathnashikha vyakhyanam
- Chamalkara chinthamani vyakhya
- Mahisha mangalabhana vyakhya
- Sreekrishna vilasa vyakhya
