= Nalankal Krishna Pillai =

Indian writer and historian

Nalankal Krishna Pillai (1910–1991) was a Malayalam-language poet and historian from Kerala, India. He received the Kerala Sahitya Akademi Award in 1980 for the work Decemberile Manjuthullikal.

== Biography ==
He was born in 1910 in Olassa near Aymanam, Kottayam district, Travancore, British India as the son of Arakkal Kesava Pillai and Nalankal Janaki Amma. After completing his school education from Olessa and Kottayam, he obtained his graduate degree and masters from Training College and Trivandrum Arts College respectively. He worked as a teacher in various institutions and retired from the government service as Regional Deputy Director.

Most of Nalankal's poems deal with unhappy homeless poor who live in the streets. His Krishna Thulasi and other poems are written in the classical style. He received the Kerala Sahitya Akademi Award in 1980 for the work Decemberile Manjuthullikal. He has also written books about the history of temples of Kerala, such as Navaratri, Kshetrapradakshinam and Mahakshetrangalude Munnil. The latter is a unique travel book in Malayalam, featuring almost all major temples in Kerala, their history, legends etc. It won him the Vyasa Award of Travancore Devaswam Board. A chronic diabetic, he died in 1991 after other age-related illnesses at the age of 81.

== Works ==
- " Ragonmadam"
- Krishna Tulsi
- Decemberile Manjuthullikal
- Ragatarangam
- Shokamudra
- Vasantakanti
- Ratna Kankanam
- Ambal Poyka
- Pookkuda
- Priyadarsini
- Sougandhikam
- Kasturi
- Sindoorarekha
- Udayagiri Chuvannu
- Navaratri (History)
- Kshetrapradakshinam (History)
- Mahakshetrangalude Munnil (History)
- Sardar Patel (Biography)
- Jawaharlal Nehru (Biography)
- Stalin (Biography)
