= Kerala Sahitya Akademi Fellowship =

- Country: India
- Presented by: Kerala Sahitya Akademi
- First award: 1970
- Website: keralasahityaakademi.org

Kerala Sahitya Akademi Fellowship is an honour of the Kerala Sahitya Akademi (Kerala Literary Academy), given to writers of Malayalam literature by inducting them as the distinguished members of the Akademi. The first two writers were awarded fellowships in 1970.

Year	Name	Image	Ref.
1970	K. P. Kesava Menon		
1970	G. Sankara Kurup		
1971	Puthezhath Raman Menon		
1973	Joseph Mundasseri		
1973	Mathew M. Kuzhiveli		
1976	V. T. Bhattathiripad		
1976	Sooranad Kunjan Pillai		
1979	N. Krishna Pillai		
1979	N. Balamani Amma		
1981	V. Unnikrishnan Nair		
1981	P. Kesavadev		
1981	Vailoppilli Sreedhara Menon		
1981	Vaikom Muhammad Basheer		
1981	Lalithambika Antharjanam		
1983	R. E. Asher		
1985	Thakazhi Sivasankara Pillai		
1985	N. V. Krishna Warrier		
1986	Kainikkara Kumara Pillai		
1986	T. M. Chummar		
1989	K. M. George		
1989	Ponkunnam Varkey		
1989	M. P. Appan		
1989	C. N. Ahmad Moulavi		
1991	Sukumar Azhikode		
1994	M. P. Sankunni Nair		
1995	K. Surendran		
1996	S. Gupthan Nair		
1997	V. K. N.		
1997	Kovilan		
1998	P. Bhaskaran		
1999	O. N. V. Kurup		
1999	M. Leelavathy		
2000	Thikkodiyan		
2001	O. V. Vijayan		
2002	Kamala Surayya		
2003	Ayyappa Paniker		
2004	Sugathakumari		
2005	M. T. Vasudevan Nair		
2006	Akkitham Achuthan Namboothiri		
2006	Pala Narayanan Nair		
2007	K. T. Muhammed		
2007	M. K. Sanu		
2008	P. Govinda Pillai		
2008	Kakkanadan		
2009	Puthussery Ramachandran		
2009	M. Achuthan		
2010	Vishnunarayanan Namboothiri		
2010	Punathil Kunjabdulla		
2010	K. Satchidanandan		
2010	C. Radhakrishnan		
2011	T. Padmanabhan		
2011	Anand		
2012	M. P. Veerendra Kumar		
2012	Paul Zacharia		
2013	Yusuf Ali Kecheri		
2013	N. S. Madhavan		
2014	M. Thomas Mathew		
2014	Kavalam Narayana Panicker		
2015	Sara Joseph		
2015	U. A. Khader		
2017	Attoor Ravi Varma		
2017	K. N. Panikkar		
2018	K. G. Sankara Pillai		
2018	M. Mukundan		
2019	P. Valsala		
2019	N. V. P. Unithiri		
2020	Sethu		
2020	Perumbadavam Sreedharan		
2021	Vaisakhan		
2021	K. P. Sankaran		
2022	M. M. Basheer		
2022	N. Prabhakaran		
2023	M. R. Raghava Warrier		
2023	C. L. Jose		
2024	K. V. Ramakrishnan		
2024	Ezhacherry Ramachandran		
