= Mathrubhumi Literary Award =

Award for Malayalam-language authors

- Award for individual contributions to Malayalam literature
- Awarded for: Literary award in India
- Sponsored by: Mathrubhumi
- Rewards: ₹300,000, citation, plaque
- First award: 2001
- Final award: 2025

Highlights
- Total awarded: 21
- First winner: Thikkodiyan
- Last winner: Sarah Joseph
- Website: media.mathrubhumi.com

Mathrubhumi Literary Award (also known as Mathrubhumi Sahitya Puraskaram) is a literary award instituted in 2001 by Malayalam daily Mathrubhumi. A sum of ₹0.3 million, a plaque and a citation constitute this annual award. The award is conferred as a recognition of a writer's overall contribution to the Malayalam literature.

== Recipients ==
Year	Recipient	Image	Ref.
2000	Thikkodiyan		
2003	M. V. Devan		
2004	Pala Narayanan Nair		
2005	O. V. Vijayan		
2006	M. T. Vasudevan Nair		
2007	M. Mukundan		
2008	Akkitham Achuthan Namboothiri		
2009	Kovilan		
2010	Vishnunarayanan Namboothiri		
2011	Sukumar Azhikode		
2012	M. Leelavathy		
2013	Punathil Kunjabdulla		
2014	Sugathakumari		
2015	T. Padmanabhan		
2016	C. Radhakrishnan		
2017	M. K. Sanu		
2018	N. S. Madhavan		
2019	U. A. Khader		
2020	K. Satchidanandan		
2022	Sethu		
2023	Zacharia		
2024	Sarah Joseph		
2025	Maythil Radhakrishnan		

== See also ==
- List of Malayalam literary awards
