= Sooranad Kunjan Pillai =

Indian writer and academic (1911–1995)

Sooranad P. N. Kunjan Pillai
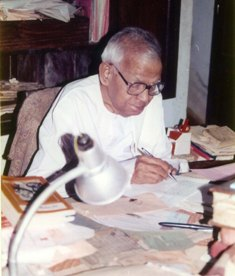
- Born: 24 June 1911; Sooranad, Kingdom of Travancore, British India (present day Kollam, Kerala, India)
- Died: 8 March 1995 (aged 83); Thiruvananthapuram, Kerala, India
- Education: MA(Eng), MA(Mal), MA(San), D.Litt.
- Spouse: C. Bhagavati Amma
- Children: 4
- Parents: Neelakanta Pillai; Karthiyani Pillai Amma
- Awards: Sahithya Nipunan; 1976 Kerala Sahitya Akademi Fellowship; 1984 Padmashri; 1992 Vallathol Award; 1993 Ezhuthachan Puraskaram

Sooranad Payikkattu Neelakanta Kunjan Pillai (24 June 1911 – 8 March 1995) was an Indian researcher, lexicographer, poet, essayist, literary critic, orator, grammarian, educationist, and scholar of the Malayalam language, best remembered for his contributions in compiling Malayala Maha Nighantu, a lexicon. The Government of India awarded him the fourth highest civilian honour of the Padmashri in 1984 for his contribution to Malayalam literature and education. He was also a recipient of the Vallathol Award in 1992 and when the Government of Kerala instituted the Ezhuthachan Puraskaram, their highest literary honour in 1993, he received the inaugural award.

== Biography ==
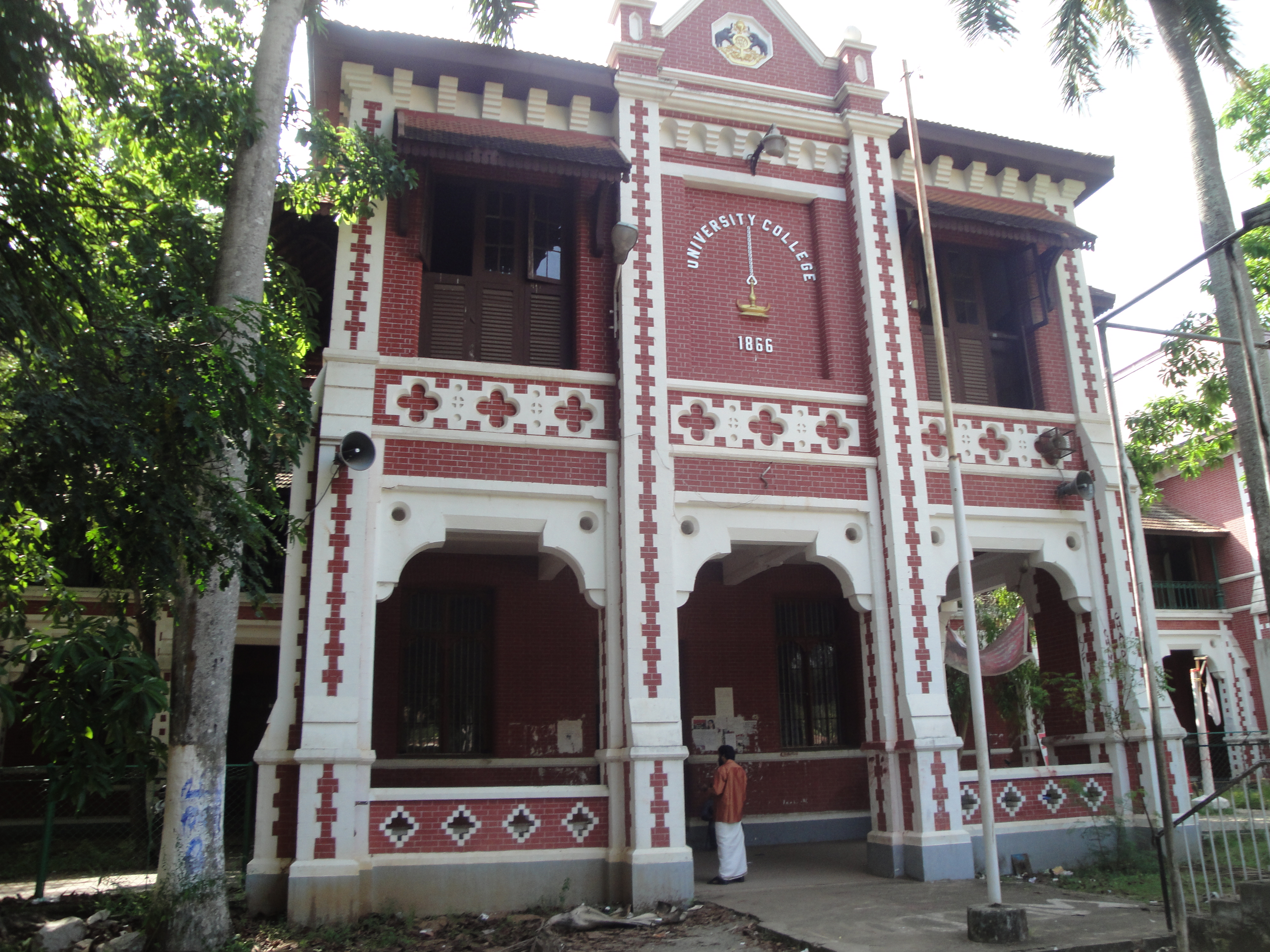
University College , Thiruvananthapuram, Pillai's alma mater

Kunjan Pillai was born on 26 November 1911 in Sooranad, near Sasthamkotta in the present day Kollam district of the south Indian state of Kerala to Nair parents Karthiyani Amma and P. Neelakanta Pillai of Payikkattu family. After initial studies under his father, he did his formal education at a local elementary school, Thevalakkara Primary School and Chavara High School where he studied under noted teacher, Azhakathu Padmanabha Kurup, and passed the 10th standard examination in 1927. Subsequently, he joined the University College, Thiruvananthapuram for his under-graduate studies with English as the optional subject and Sanskrit as subsidiary and graduated in 1933 and earned a master's degree in English in 1933. Continuing his education, he secured two more master's degrees, in Sanskrit in 1934 and in Malayalam in 1935.

Pillai started his professional career as an English teacher in St. Joseph School, Thiruvananthapuram and retired from government service in 1971 as the Chief Editor of Malayalam Lexicon, University of Kerala, a position he held from 1953. In between, he served in various positions such as the Secretary of Text Book Committee, as an assistant to Sadasya Tilakam T. K. Velu Pillai in the preparation of Travancore State Manual, as the assistant secretary of education to the Government of Kerala, as the honorary director of the Kerala University Manuscripts Library, as a member of Indian Historical Records Commission and University of Kerala Faculty of Oriental Studies, as the editor of Kerala Archives News Letter Board, as the chief advisor of Navasahithi Biographical Encyclopedia, as a member of the Phd Evaluation Board of University of Kerala, as the president of Sahithya Parishad, as an executive council member of the Kendra Sahitya Akademi, Kerala Sahitya Akademi and History Association, as the president of Kanfed, as the editor of the Journal of Indian History and as a member of the first Jnanpith Award Committee. He also presided over the fourth Annual Conference of Dravidian Linguists held in Chennai in 1974.

Kunjan Pillai was married to C. Bhagavathi Amma (of the Panniyarathala family in Jagathy, d. 2007), the marriage taking place in 1935. He died on 8 March 1995, at the age of 83, survived by his wife, three daughters and a son, the eminent neurologist Dr. K. Rajasekharan Nair.

== Legacy ==
Kunjan Pillai was known to have written books in Malayalam, English and Sanskrit his oeuvre covered such genres as novels, short stories, poems, biographies, history, essays, lexicon and grammar. He also had some knowledge of Tamil and Hindi. He published his first work Smashanadeepam (Collected Poems) in 1925 when he was still in school. He has prepared more than 150 textbooks for high school classes. He has written more than 1000 forewords for the books of many contemporary writers of Malayalam. He led a team which compiled a Malayala nikhandu (Malayalam Dictionary), though the work could not be completed during his time. The work, started in 1953 and by the time the first and second volumes were published by 1970, the team of scholars had examined all important available texts from eleventh century to 19th century. He also compiled the Malayalam translation of Kathasaritsagara, a book of fables and legends in Sanskrit.

== Awards and honours ==
The Rajah of Cochin honoured Kunjan Pillai with the title Sahithya Nipunan. In 1984 he was honoured with Padmashri by Govt. of India. He was inducted as a distinguished fellow by the History Association and by the Kerala Sahitya Akademi in 1976. He received the Vallathol Award in 1992 and the Government of Kerala awarded him the inaugural Ezhuthachan Puraskaram, their highest literary award, in 1993. He was also honoured by two Indian universities with D.Litt; by Meerut University in 1991 and University of Kerala in 1992.

An annual award, Sooranad Kunjan Pillai Award, has been instituted for recognizing excellence in Malayalam literature and M. Leelavathy is among the writers who have received the award.

== Selected bibliography ==
=== Novels ===
- Amba Devi (Novel) 1930
- Kalyana Sowdam (Novel) 1936
- Kunjan Pillai, Sooranadu. Pushpanjali. Thiruvananthapuram: V V Book Depot.

=== Poems ===
- Smashanadeepam (Collected poems) 1930
- Kunjan Pillai, Sooranadu (1954). Vathil thurappathukal. Thiruvananthapuram.
- Kunjan Pillai, Sooranadu (1956). Kuchelavrutham. Thiruvananthapuram.
- Kunjan Pillai, Sooranadu (1956). Unniyatee charitam. Thiruvananthapuram: Manuscript Library.
- Kunjan Pillai, Sooranadu (1957). Sabhapravesampan. Thiruvananthapuram: Author.
- Hridayarpanam (Collected poems) 1971
- Kunjan Pillai, Sooranattu (1962). Ramayanam irupathnalu vrutham. Vidhya vilasini: Vidhya vilasini.
- Kunjan Pillai, Sooranadu, ed. (2011). Leelathilakam (3rd ed.). Thiruvananthapuram: Kerala Bhasha Institute. ISBN 9788176389860.

=== Short stories ===
- Kunjan Pillai, Sooranadu (1947). Sourabhan. Thiruvananthapuram: P. Govinda Pillai.
- Ratnasamragyam (Stories) 1948
- Kunjan Pillai, Sooranattu (1968). Ponnirathalkadha. University of kerala: University of kerala.
- Panchathantrakathamanigal (Stories)

=== Biography ===
- Prachinakeralam (Biographies)1931
- Veeraraghavashasanam (Biography) 1954
- Thiruvuthankoorile Mahanmar (Biographies) 1946
- Kunjan pillai, Sooranad (1989). Sree swati thirunal Rama Varma Maharajavu. Kendreeya Mahatmakkal. Trivandrum, Govoernment of Kerala.
- Sree Sankaracharyar (Biography) 1945

=== Lexicon ===
- Suranad Kunjan Pillai, ed. (1965). Malayalam lexicon : a comprehensive Malayalam--Malayalam-English dictionary on historical and philological principles (in Malayalam). London: Distributed by Books from India.

=== Drama ===
- Kunjan pillai, Sooranad (1957). Asokavanikankam (in Malayalam). Trivandrum, Government of Kerala: Manuscript Library.

=== Essays and literary criticism ===
- Thiruvuthankoor - Kochi Charithra Kathakal, 1932
- Kunjan Pillai, Sooranad (1938). Thirumulkazcha. Trivandrum.
- Jeevithakala, 1939
- Malabar in the Eyes of Travellers, 1940
- Kunjan Pillai, Sooranad (1954). Varnavidhikal. Trivandrum.
- Kunjan Pillai, Sooranad (1954). Alankarasamkshepam. Trivandrum.
- Kunjan Pillai, Sooranad (1955). Kalarividya. Bhasha Grandhavali. Trivandrum.
- Bhashadeepika, 1955
- Kunjan Pillai, Sooranad (1956). Nhaanmuthumaala. Bhasha Grandhavali. Trivandrum.
- Pushpanjali (Collected Essays) 1957
- Kunjan Pillai, Sooranadu (1962). Malayala kavya ratnakaram. Thrissur: Kerala Sahitya Akademi.
- Kairali Pooja (Collected Essays) 1962
- Hridayaramam, 1966
- Malayala Lipi parishkaram- Chila Nirdeshangal, 1967
- Kunjan Pillai, Sooranad (1954). Mathrupooja. Trivandrum.
- Kairali Samaksham (Literary Criticism)1979
- Bharathapooja, 1983
- Kunjan Pillai, Sooranad (1979). Kairalee Samaksham Adhava Agrapooja. Trivandrum, Jaya Printets.
- Kunjan Pillai, Sooranad. Sahitya pravesika. Trivandrum: Govinda Pillai.
- Kunjan Pillai, Sooranad. Veera raghava sasanam. Trivandrum: Vidyavilasini.
- Sahithyabhooshanam (Collected Essays)
- Krisishastram

== See also ==
- List of Malayalam-language authors by category
- List of Malayalam-language authors
