= Pala Narayanan Nair =

Indian poet & lyricist (1911–2008)

- Born: 11 December 1911; Palai, Kottayam, Kerala, India
- Died: 11 June 2008 (aged 96); Kottayam, Kerala
- Occupation: Poet
- Spouse: Subhadrakutty Amma
- Children: 4
- Relatives: Keezhpallil Sankaran Nair (father); Puliannoor Puthoor Parvathy Amma (mother)
- Writing career
- Notable works: Keralam Valarunnu; Amritakala; Vilakku Koluthoo
- Notable awards: 1976 Kerala Sahitya Akademi Award for Poetry; 1991 Vallathol Award; 1992 FOKANA Kerala Ganam Award; 1999 Ulloor Award; 2000 Ezhuthachan Puraskaram; 2001 Asan Smaraka Kavitha Puraskaram; 2004 Mathrubhumi Literary Award; 2006 Kerala Sahitya Akademi Fellowship; Puthezhan Award; Mooloor Award

Pala Narayanan Nair (11 December 1911 – 11 June 2008) was an Indian poet and lyricist, best known for his work, Keralam Valarunnu, written in 1953, comprising eight volumes, which earned him the title of Mahakavi. He wrote more than 5,000 poems, which have been compiled in about 43 anthologies. Nair, who also wrote the lyrics for the 1956 Malayalam movie, Avar Unarunnu, was a recipient of the Ezhuthachan Puraskaram, the highest literary honour of the Government of Kerala as well as Vallathol Award and Kerala Sahitya Akademi Award for Poetry, besides other honours.

== Biography ==
Narayanan Nair was born on 11 December 1911 in Pala of Kottayam district in Kerala to Keezhpallil Sankaran Nair and Puliannoor Puthoor Parvathy Amma. His schooling was at St. Thomas School, Pala from where he passed the final examination but his father's death in 1932 forced him to start earning and he joined Palai Central Bank as an accountant, simultaneously giving private tutions. He moved to S. M. V. S. High School as teacher in 1937 but had to quit the job during World War II to join the Indian Army. He quit military service in 1947 to join the University of Kerala (then known as the University of Travancore) in their publications division. While working at the university, he resumed his studies to earn a bachelor's degree in 1954 and a master's degree in Malayalam in 1956, standing first in the examination. He retired from the university in 1967 as the head of the department of publications and served as a professor of Malayalam at Alphonsa College, Palai until 1972. He also served at MMNSS College Kottiyam for a while.

Narayanan Nair was married to Subhadrakutty Amma and the couple had two daughters and two sons. He died, at the age of 96, on 11 June 2008, at a private hospital in Kottayam, where he had been admitted following age-related illnesses.

== Legacy ==
Narayanan Nair published 43 poetry anthologies and Keralam Valarunnu (Kerala is growing), an eight-volume epic which earned him the title, Mahakavi. Pookkal, Adima, Nirdhanan, Padakkalam, Bhasparangam, Anthya Pooja, Olangal, Kairali Murali, Ragalapam, Manusyan, Malanad, Paalazhy, Sundarakadam, Amarajyothi, Pournami, Meghasancharam, VilakkuKoluthu, Soorya Gayathri, Samara Mukhathu, Ananthapuri, Shravanageetham and Amruthavarshini feature among his notable works. Besides his poems, he wrote the lyrics for Avar Unarunnu, a Malayalam movie directed by N. Sankaran Nair and released in 1956. Besides the nine songs featured in the film, he also wrote other songs. When Kerala Sahitya Akademi was constituted in 1957, he was elected as the founder secretary of the academy, a post he held for two years.

== Awards and honours ==
The Kerala Sahitya Akademi awarded Nair their annual award for poetry in 1976 for his anthology, Vilakku Koluthoo. He received the inaugural Vallathol Award in 1991 followed by FOKANA Kerala Ganam Award, the next year. Ulloor Smaraka Samithi awarded him the Ulloor Award in 1999 and he received the Ezhuthachan Puraskaram, the highest literary award of the Government of Kerala in 2000. A year later, he was selected for the 2001 Asan Smaraka Kavitha Puraskaram and he received the Mathrubhumi Literary Award in 2004. A recipients of other honours such as Puthezhan Award and Mooloor Award, Nair was honoured by Kerala Sahitya Akademi with their distinguished fellowship in 2006.

Mahatma Gandhi University has instituted a chair, Pala Narayanan Nair Chair, in his honour with Sukumar Azhikode, holding the chair during the initial two years. Pala: Kavithakalude Palazhy is a documentary film made by Jinoop J. Nair on the life of Narayanan Nair.

== Bibliography ==
- Narayanan Nair Pala (1996). Kerala Valarunnu. D.C. Books, Kottayam: D.C. Books, Kottayam.
- Narayanan Nair, Palai (1986). Thenkuruvikal. Kottayam: National Book Stall.
- Narayanan Nair, Pala; Parameswaranpillai, Erumeli (2011). Theranjedutha kavithakal (1st ed.). Thrissur: Kerala Sahithya Academy. ISBN 9788176901765.
- Narayanan Nair, Pala (2008). Sisu ganangal. Kollam: Keerthi Books.
- Narayanan Nair. Pala (1973). Megha Sancharam. SahitiaPravarthaka Sahakaransangam: SahitiaPravarthaka Sahakaransangam.
- Narayanan nair. Pala (1951). Bashpa rangam. Press Ramsass: Press Ramsass.
- Narayanan Nair. Pala (1971). Pournami. Kottayam: Sahithyapravarthaka sahakaranasangam.
- Narayanan Nair. Pala (1966). Palazhi. Kottayam: National book stall.
- Narayanan Nair, Pala (1949). Nirdhanan. Kottayam: N.B.S.
- Narayanan Nair, Pala (1975). Vilakku Koluthu. KOTTAYAM: N.B.S.
- Narayanan Nair, Pala (1977). Sravana geetham.
- Narayanan Nair, Pala (1985). Samara mukhathu. Kottayam: S.P.C.S.
- Naryanan Nair, Pala (1979). Aalipazham. Kottayam: Vidhyarthi mithram.
- Narayanan Nair, Pala (2003). Kumkuma pookkal. Kottayam: Malayala Gaveshanavedi.
- Narayanan Nair, Pala (1979). Aalippazham. Vidhyarthimithram.
- Narayanan Nair, Pala (1988). Anandapuri. Kottayam: S.P.C.S.

=== Writings on Pala Narayanan Nair ===
- Sajeev Krishnan (2012). Pala Narayanan Nair amruthakalayude kavi (1st ed.). Thrissur: Kerala Sahithya Academy. ISBN 9788176902281.
- Menath, Ashok (2008). "Pala Narayanan Nair: The Poet-Patriarch of Optimism". Indian Literature. 52 (4 (246)): 15–18. ISSN 0019-5804. JSTOR 23347910.

== See also ==
- List of Malayalam-language authors by category
- List of Malayalam-language authors
