= Yusufali Kechery =

Indian poet (1934-2015)

- Born: 16 May 1934; Kechery, Trichur district, Kingdom of Cochin
- Died: 21 March 2015 (aged 80); Kochi, Kerala, India
- Occupations: Film Director, film producer, poet, film lyricist

Yusufali Kechery (Yūsaphali Kēccēri; 16 May 1934 – 21 March 2015) was a poet, film lyricist, film producer, and director from Kerala, India. He wrote during the modern era of Malayalam poetry and won the Odakkuzhal Award, the Kerala Sahitya Academy Award and the Vallathol Award.

== Career ==
K. P. Narayana Pisharody was Kechery's Sanskrit teacher and taught him free of cost for four years. Kechery's poetic works include Sainaba, Aayiram Navulla Mounam, Anchu Kanyakakal, Nadabhramam, Amrithu, Kecheri Puzha, Anuragagaanam Pole, Aalila, Kadhaye Premicha Kavitha, Perariyatha Nombaram and Ahaindavam. He was a lawyer by profession.

He also directed the films Vanadevatha (1977) and Neelathamara (1979). He wrote the lyrics for the songs in the film Dhwani, which were composed by musician Naushad. In 2000, he was awarded a National Award for a Sanskrit song written for the Malayalam film Mazha.

Kechery died on 21 March 2015 at Amrita Hospital in Kochi, aged 80.

== Awards ==
=== Literary awards ===
- 1985: Kerala Sahitya Akademi Award — Aayiram Naavulla Maunam
- 1987: Odakkuzhal Award — Kechery Puzha
- 1988: Asan Smaraka Kavitha Puraskaram — Kechery Puzha
- 1990: Asan Smaraka Kavitha Puraskaram
- 2001: Deviprasadam Trust Award
- 2012: Vallathol Award
- 2012: Balamani Amma Award
- 2013: Kerala Sahitya Akademi Fellowship

=== Film awards ===
- 1993: Kerala State Film Award for Best Lyrics - Ghazal
- 1994: Kerala State Film Award for Best Lyrics - Parinayam
- 1998: Kerala State Film Award for Best Lyrics - Sneham
- 1999: Asianet Film Award for Best Lyricist -Deepasthambham Mahascharyam
- 2000: National Film Award for Best Lyricist - Mazha
- Prem Nazir Award
- Kunchacko Memorial Award
