= M. Leelavathy =

Indian writer and academic

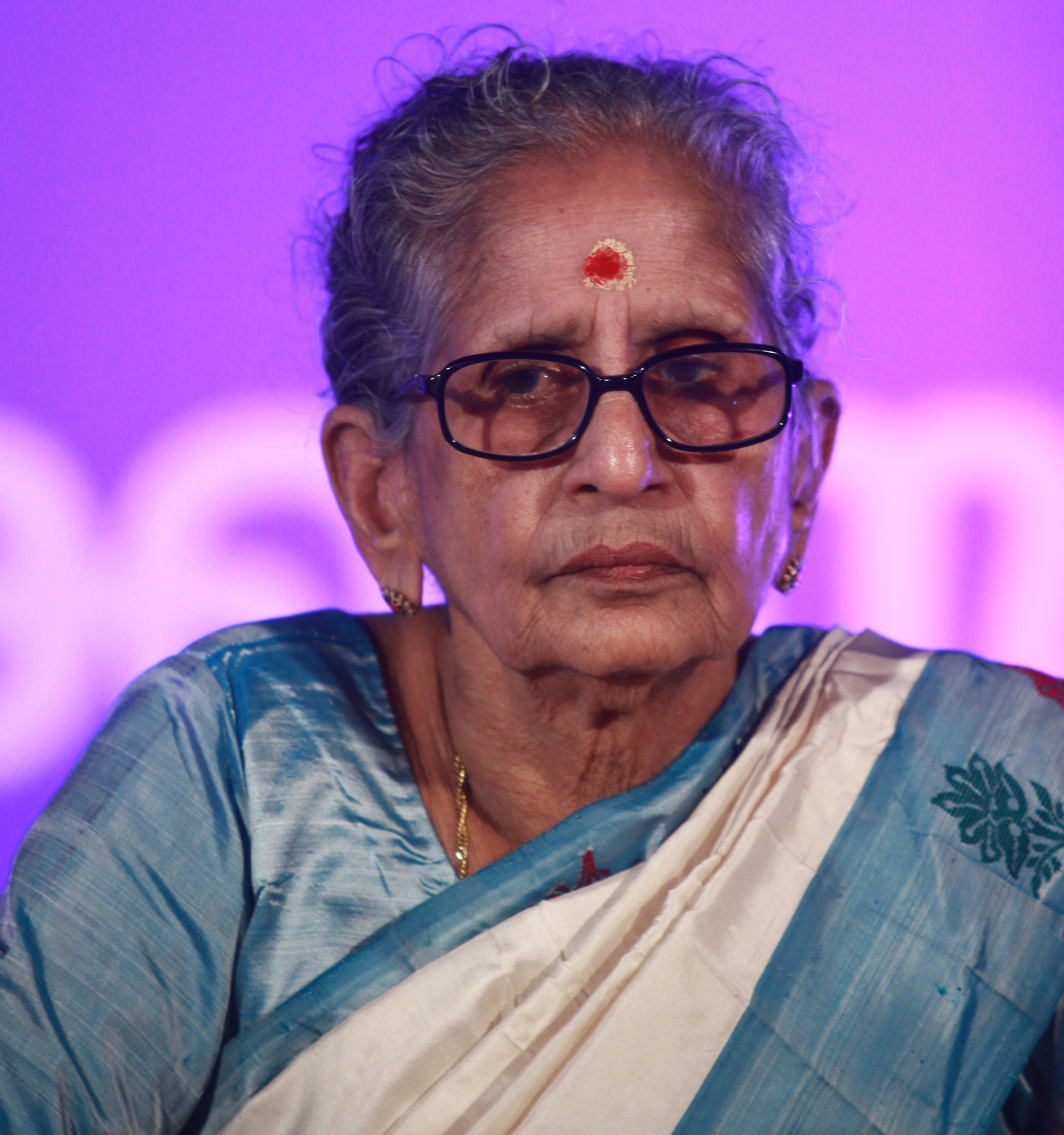
- Born: 16 September 1927 (age 99); Kottappadi, Thrissur
- Education: PhD
- Occupations: Critic, teacher
- Spouse: C. Purushothama Menon
- Children: Vinayakumar; Jayakumar
- Parent(s): Kazhunkampilli Kunjunni Nambidi; Mundanat Nangayya Maandal
- Awards: 1978 Odakuzhal Award; 1980 Kerala Sahitya Akademi Award; 1986 Sahitya Akademi Award; 1993 Nalapadan Award; 1999 Lalithambika Antarjanam Award; 2002 Vallathol Award; 2005 Basheer Award; 2007 Guptan Nair Memorial Award; 2007 Vayalar Award; 2008 Padma Shri; 2010 Ezhuthachan Puraskaram; 2011 Mathrubhumi Literary Award; 2020 O. N. V. Literary Award; 2021 Kendra Sahithya Akademy Award

Mundanat Leelavathy (born 16 September 1927) is a Malayalam writer, literary critic and educationist. She taught at various colleges in Kerala before retiring as Principal from Government Brennen College, Thalassery. During her long literary career, she won several awards including Sahitya Akademi Award and Kerala Sahitya Akademi Award. She is a contemporary of such noted critics in Malayalam including K. M. George, S. Guptan Nair, N. Krishna Pillai, P. K. Balakrishnan, M. K. Sanu and Sukumar Azhikode. Leelavathy is a recipient of the Padma Shri Award.

== Education and career ==
Leelavathy was born in Kottapadi near Guruvayur in Thrissur district (then in Malabar district of Madras State) on 16 September 1927. Her parents were Kazhungampilly Kunjunni Nambidi and Mundanat Nangayya Mandal, and she was their eldest child. She attended school in Kunnamkulam, another nearby town (Kottapadi is midway between Guruvayur and Kunnamkulam), before joining Maharaja's College, Ernakulam for her BA degree. She received her MA degree from Madras University. Leelavathy began her teaching career in 1949 as a lecturer at St. Mary's College, Thrissur. After a brief stint at Stella Maris College, Chennai, she joined Victoria College, Palakkad in 1952 and subsequently taught at Maharaja's College and Government Brennen College, Thalassery. She was awarded her PhD degree from Kerala University in 1972. For a brief period of time, she also served as a visiting professor in University of Calicut. Leelavathy retired from Brennen College in 1983. She now lives in Thrikkakkara in Ernakulam district.

== Awards and honours ==
During her long literary career, she won several awards and honours including Odakuzhal Award (1978) and Kerala Sahitya Akademi Award (1980) for Varnaraji, Kendra Sahitya Akademi Award (1986) for Kavithadhwani, Nalapadan Award given by Nalapadan Memorial Cultural Society (1993) for Aadi Prabhandhangal Sahithyathil Lalithambika Antarjanam Award (1999), Vallathol Award (2002), Basheer Award (2005), Guptan Nair Memorial Award (2007), Vayalar Award (2007) for Appuvinte Anweshanam, and FACT MKK Nayar Award (2009). Leelavathy is also a recipient of Padma Shri Award for her contribution to the Malayalam literature and education. She won Ezhuthachan Puraskaram, the highest literary prize in Kerala, in 2010, for her outstanding critical works. She was also conferred with many other literary awards including the Mathrubhumi Literary Award (2011), P. S. John Award (2011), K. P. Kesava Menon Award (2014), and O. N. V. Literary Award (2020). In 2021, she was also awarded with the prestigious Kendra Sahitya Academy Fellowship.

=== List of awards ===
Year	Awards	Work	Reference
1979	Odakkuzhal Award	Varnaraji	
1980	Kerala Sahitya Akademi Award for Literary Criticism	Varnaraaji	
1986	Sahitya Akademi Award for Critical study in Malayalam	Kavitadwani	
1999	Lalithambika Antharjanam Smaraka Sahitya Award	Rosemary	
2002	Vallathol Award		
2004	Abu Dhabi Sakthi Award (Thayat Award)		
2004	Deviprasadam Trust Award		
2005	Basheer Award		
2007	Guptan Nair Memorial Award		
2007	Vayalar Award	Appuvinte Anweshanam	
2008	Padma Shri	in Literature & Education field	
2010	Ezhuthachan Puraskaram		
2012	Mathrubhumi Literary Award		
2018	Sahitya Akademi Translation Prize	Sreemad Valmeeki Ramayana	
2020	O. N. V. Literary Award		
2021	Thakazhi Memorial Award		
2025	Priyadarshini Literary Award		
