= Paul Zacharia =

Indian writer (born 1945)

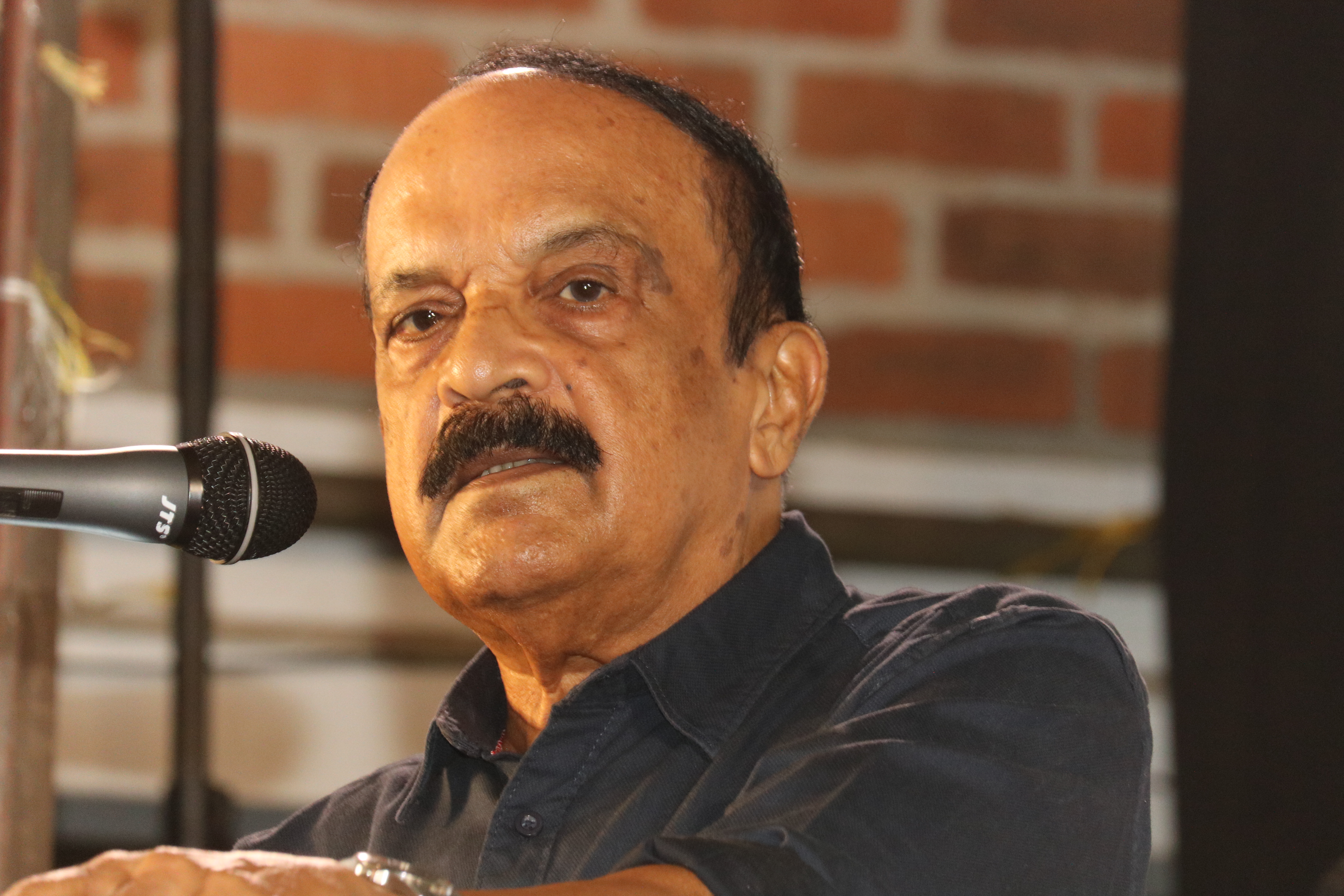
- Paul zacharia at Kollam 2025
- Born: M. P. Scaria; 5 June 1945 (age 81); Urulikunnam, Travancore, (present day, Kottayam district, Kerala, India)
- Occupations: Short story Writer, Novelist and essayist
- Spouse: Lalitha
- Relatives: M. S. Paul (father); Thresiakutty (mother); M.P. Joseph (brother); Mary Mundattuchundayil (sister)
- Writing career
- Language: Malayalam
- Notable awards: Sahitya Akademi Award, Kerala Sahitya Akademi Award, Vallathol Award 2019, Ezhuthachan Puraskaram 2020

Mundattuchundayil Paul Scaria (born 5 June 1945), popularly known as Paul Zacharia or Zacharia, is an Indian writer of Malayalam literature. Known for his body of literary works composed of short stories, novellas, travelogues, screenplays, essays, columns and children's books, Zacharia is a distinguished fellow of Kerala Sahitya Akademi. He is also a recipient of the Ezhuthachan Puraskaram, Kendra Sahitya Akademi Award and the Kerala Sahitya Akademi Award for Story.

== Biography ==
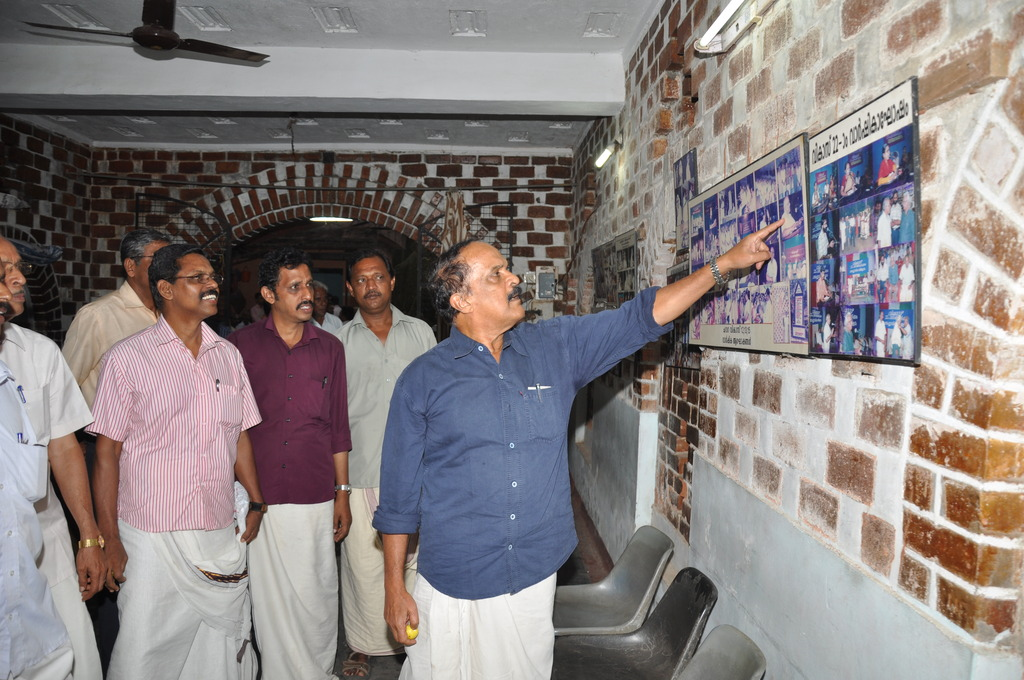
Zacharia at Chavara Vikas Cultural Club

Born M. P. Scaria (Zacharia) on 5 June 1945, in Urulikunnam, near Kottayam, then in Travancore, Zacharia was the youngest of the three children of a farmer named M. S. Paul of the Mundattuchundayil house and his wife, Thresiakutty Paul. His early education was at Sree Dayananda Primary School, a local school in Urulikunnam and later he continued his studies at St Joseph's High School, Vilakumadom from where he matriculated in 1960. Subsequently, he completed the pre-University course at St. Thomas College, Palai in 1961 and moved to St. Philomena's College, Mysore to earn his bachelor's degree in English Literature, History, and Economics in 1964. His post-graduate education was at the Central College of Bangalore and after earning a master's degree in English literature in 1966, he started his career as a lecturer of English at MES College, Malleswaram where he worked for a year.

Returning to his home state, Zacharia joined St. Dominic's College, Kanjirappally in 1967 as a lecturer and stayed there until his move to Coimbatore in 1971 to take up the position of the area manager of Ruby Tyre and Rubber Works, Bengaluru. His stay in Coimbatore lasted only a year and shifted his base to New Delhi to spend the next two decades there, working with various media and publishing houses such as Affiliated East-West Press, All India Management Association (AIMA), Press Trust of India (PTI) and the Malayalam edition of the India Today. He returned to Kerala in 1993 and was a part of the group that founded Asianet. There, he also co-hosted a show, Patravisesham, the first television program review, along with a senior journalist, B. R. P. Bhaskar, which ran for 7 years.

Zacharia lives in Thiruvananthapuram.

== Literary career ==
Zacharia has been compared to Jorge Luis Borges as he has limited his creative writing to short stories and novellas. He writes regularly for Kerala's leading newspapers and magazines, has been a public speaker for over two decades airing his non-conformist stance in politics, and his writing is marked by humour and unconventional themes. His columns and articles in English have also appeared in national periodicals such as ‘India Today’, ‘Outlook’, ‘The Week’, ‘The Hindu’ ‘Deccan Herald,’ ‘The Pioneer’, ‘The Times of India’ ‘The Economic Times’, ‘The Hindustan Times,’ ‘Tehelka’, ‘The New Indian Express’ and ‘The Indian Express’.

A keen traveller, Zacharia has published travelogues on Africa, England, Saudi Arabia, and China, as well as the Kumbh Mela. In his writing career spanning six decades, he has been the recipient of several awards and honours such as the Kendra Sahitya Akademi (Indian Academy of Literature) Award and Kerala Sahitya Akademi (Kerala Academy of Literature) Award. In November 2013 he was elected a Distinguished Fellow of the Kerala Sahitya Akademi.

Paul Zacharia is a member of the Press Club of India, New Delhi and Thiruvananthapuram Club, Thiruvananthapuram. He lives in Thiruvananthapuram, and is married to Lalitha. They have a daughter and a son.

== Works ==
=== Short story collections ===
- Zacharia (1969). Kunnu. Current Books.
- Zacharia (1969). Ambadi. Poorna Publications.
- Zacharia (1978). Oridathu: Zachariyayude kathakal. SPCS.
- Zacharia (1983). Oru Nasrani Yuvavum Goulisasthravum. Current Books.
- Zacharia (1986). Aarkariyam: kathakaḷ. Current Books.
- Zacharia (1993). Salaam America. Kasaragode, Kalakshethram: DC Books.
- Zacharia (1997). Kannaadi Kaanmolavum: kathakaḷ. DC Books. ISBN 978-81-7130-774-6.
- Zacharia (1997). Kannaadi Kaanmolavum. Kottayam, DCB: DC Books.
- Zacharia (1999). Kanyakumari: kathakaḷ. DC Books. ISBN 9788126400478.
- Zacharia (2001). Zachariayude Penkathakal: kathakaḷ. DC Books. ISBN 9788126402663.
- Zacharia (2002). Zachariayude Thiranjedutha Kathakal. Current Books.
- Zacharia (2002). Zachariyayude Kathakal. DC Books. ISBN 9788126404766.
- Zacharia (2003). Prathikathakal. Kottayam, D C Books. ISBN 9788126406753.
- Zacharia (2007). Zachariyayude Yeshu. DC Books. ISBN 9788126412747.
- Zacharia (2008). Ente Priyapetta Kathakal. Kottayam: DC Books.
- Zacharia (2011). Alphonsammayude Maranavum Shavasamskaravum. DC Books. Archived from the original on 3 February 2019.
- Zacharia (2016). Then. DC Books. ISBN 9788126474769. Archived from the original on 3 February 2019.

=== Novellas ===
- Zacharia (1988). Bhaskara Pattelarum Ente Jeevithavum. Kottayam: DC Books.
- Zacharia (1996). Enthundu Visesham Pilatose?. DC Books. ISBN 9788171306787.
- Zacharia (1996). Praise the Lord!. DC Books. ISBN 9788171305827.
- Zacharia (1999). Ishtikayum Aasariyum. DC Books. ISBN 9788171309115.
- Zacharia (2001). Ithanente Peru. Kottayam, D C Books. ISBN 9788126403561.
- Zacharia (2003). Ayyappathinthkathom!. Kottayam, D C Books. ISBN 9788126407378.
- Zacharia (2003). Zachariyayude Novellakal. DC Books. ISBN 8126408758. Archived from the original on 3 February 2019.

=== Travelogues ===
- Zacharia (2005). Oru African yaathra. Kottayam, D C Books. ISBN 9788126414390.
- Zacharia (2007). Thadakanadu. DC Books. ISBN 978-81-264-1590-8.
- Zacharia (2007). Nabiyude Naṭṭil. DC Books. ISBN 978-81-264-1858-9.
- Zacharia (2009). Agniparvathangalude Thaazhvarayil. DC Books. ISBN 978-81-264-2248-7.
- Zacharia (2011). Bambam! Hara Hara Bambam Bol!. Kottayam: DC Books.
- Zacharia (283). Vazhipokkan. DC Books. ISBN 9788126438884. Archived from the original on 3 February 2019.

=== Collections of essays ===
- Govindam Bhaja Moodamathe – Current Books, Kottayam, 1992
- Zacharia (2002). Budhijeevikalekondu Enth Prayojanam?. Kollam, Sankeerthanam Publications.
- Zacharia (1997). Buddhanum Njanum. Calicut, Mulberry.
- Matha Amrithanandamayi: Bhagyavathiyum Nirbhagyavathiyum – Current Books, Thrissoor, 1999
- Zacharia (2001). Karutha Kai. Kollam, Sankeerthanam Publications.
- Matham, samskaram, Mathamoulikavaadam – Current Books, Thrissoor, 2001
- Zacharia (2002). Sakhave Naam Aarkkuvendi Vilapikkanam?. Kollam, Sankeerthanam Publications.
- Amrithanandamayi: Khattam Randu – Haritham Books, Kozhikode, 2003
- Kayyoppukal, Haritham Books, Kozhikode, 2003
- Zacharia (2004). Malayaliyude Avasaantahe Athazham. Kozhikode, Mathrubhumi Books. ISBN 9788182640337.
- Sthuthiyayirikkatte – Rainbow Books, Chengannoor, 2004
- Italian Connection – Sankeerthanam Publications, Kollam, 2006
- Chavattukuttakal Undakunnathu – Pulari Books, Chennai, 2007
- Njan Ezhuthunnathu Enthukondu? – Sankeerthanam Publications, Kollam, 2008
- Bhakthiyum Pathrapravarthanavum – Olive Books, Kozhikode, 2009
- Zacharia (2011). Samsarangal. Current Books.
- Zacharia (2013). Sanmanassullavarku Samadanam. Kottayam: DC Books.
- Ezhuthukaaranu Parayanullathu, Green Books, 2017
- Maayaasooryan, Green Books, 2017
- Ezhuthukaarkku Indiakku Vendi Enthu Cheyyan Kazhiyum? Olive Books. 2017

=== Memoirs ===
- Zacharia (2011). Urulikunnathinte Lutheenia. Kottayam: DC Books.

=== Children's literature ===
- Vaayanasaala, – Kearal State Institute of Children’s Literature, Trivandrum, 2008
- Padayaali – Kerala State Institute of Children's Literature, Trivandrum, 2009
- Shanthanuvinte Pakshikal – Kerala State Institute of Children's Literature, Trivandrum, 2011
- Zacharia (2009). Ju-story. Chennai: Tulika. ISBN 9788181467348. OCLC 840599219.

=== Translations into Malayalam ===
- Bhavanayude Anthyam – Arundhathi Roy, DC Books, Kottayam, 1999
- Njangal Ningalkku Bhoomi Vittaal – Chief Seattle's speech, DC Books, Kottayam, 2010
- Oru Enthinenthinu Penkutty – Mahaswetha Devi, Tulika, Chennai, 2003

=== Screenplays ===
- Zacharia (1997). Joseph Oru Purohithan. DC Books. ISBN 9788171307302.
- Janani – Sign Books, Trivandrum, 2005

=== TV serials ===
- Kairalivilasam Lodge, Doordarshan, Thiruvananthapuram, 1988

== Translations of works into other languages ==
=== English ===
- Zacharia (1994). Bhaskara Patellar and other stories: translated from Malayalam. Manas, an imprint of Affiliated East-West Press. ISBN 9788185938110.
- Zacharia; A. J. Thomas (of Delhi.) (1999). The Reflections of a Hen in Her Last Hour and Other Stories. Penguin Books India. ISBN 978-0-14-027844-6.
- Zacharia (1 January 2001). Praise the lord; What news, pilate?. two novellas. Katha. ISBN 978-81-87649-10-6.
- Zacharia, Paul (2001). Two Novellas. Translated by Krishnankutty, Gita. Katha. ASIN B003DRPFS4.
- This is My Name - The Little Magazine, New Delhi, 2002 (extract from full translation)

=== German ===
- Paul Zacharia (2004). Bhaskara Pattelar und andere Geschichten. Horlemann Verlag. ISBN 978-3895021794.

=== Kodava ===
- Babu Patela- Karnataka Kodava Sahitya Academy, Madikeri, 1996

== Awards ==
- Kendra Sahitya Akademi Award (Indian Academy of Literature)
- Ezhuthachan Puraskaram 2020
- Vallathol Award 2019
- Mathrubhumi Literary Award 2023
- Kerala Sahitya Akademi Award for Story (Kerala Academy of Literature)
- Distinguished Fellowship of the Kerala Sahitya Akademi
