= Pudiyankam =

Pudiyankam Puthiyankam Pudiyankam
- village
- Nickname: Puthiyankam
- Location in Kerala, India Pudiyankam (India)
- Coordinates: 10°38′25″N 76°33′20″E
- India: India
- State: Kerala
- District: Palakkad

Languages
  - Official: Malayalam, English
- Time zone: UTC+5:30 (IST)
- PIN: 678545
- Telephone code: 04922
- Vehicle registration: KL-49
- Nearest city: Palakkad
- Literacy: 100%%
- Lok Sabha constituency: Alathur

Pudiyankam, or Puthiyankam is a village in Alathur Taluk, located in the Palakkad district of the southern Indian state of Kerala.

== Notable people ==
- Methil Devika, classical dancer
- Maythil Radhakrishnan, novelist
