= S. K. Vasanthan =

Indian academic and Malayalam language writer

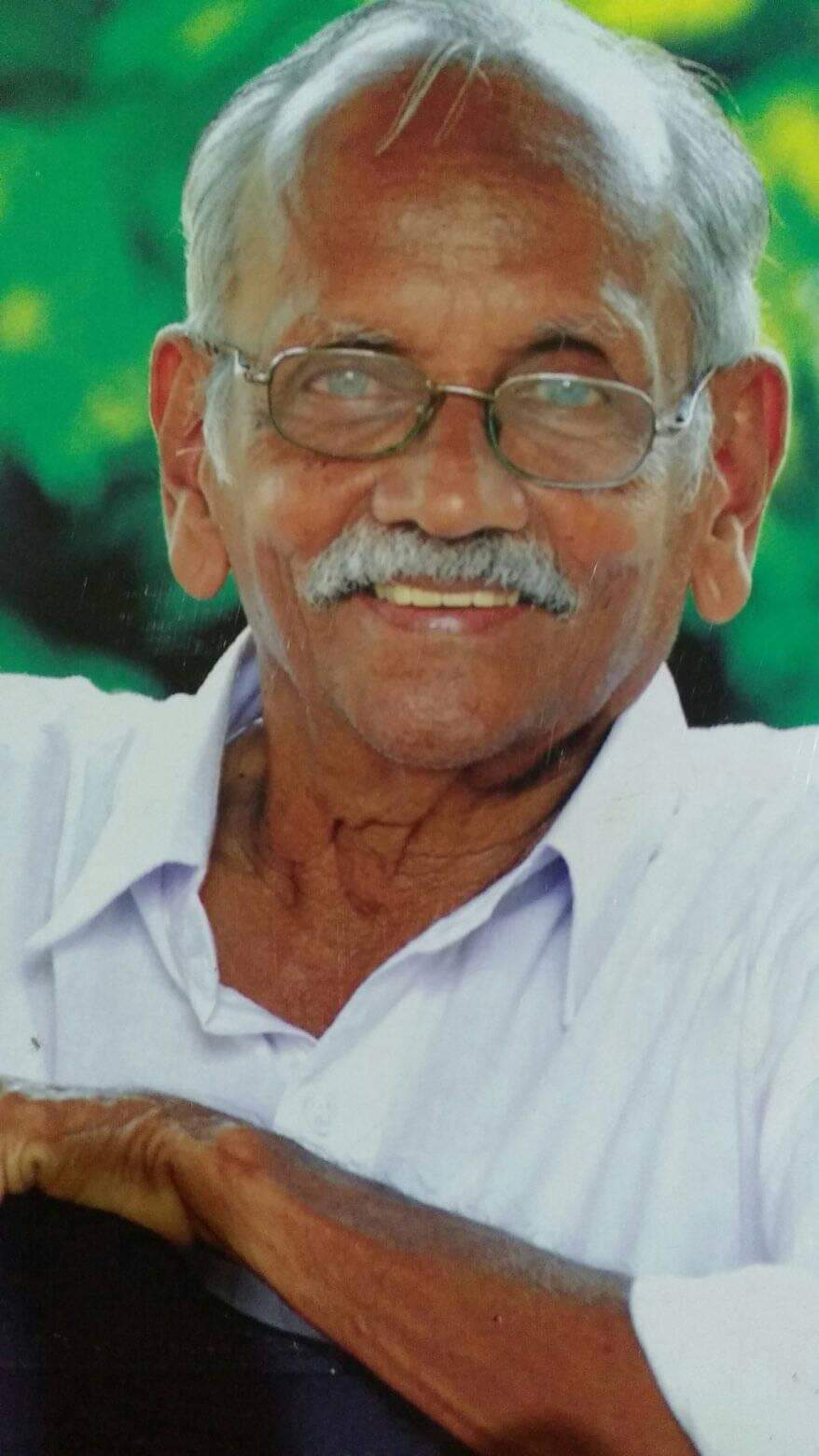
- Born: 17 November 1935 (age 90); Edappally, Kingdom of Cochin
- Citizenship: India
- Occupations: Writer, academic
- Parent(s): Karunakara Menon, Saraswathi Amma
- Writing career
- Genres: Critical study, novel
- Notable work: Kerala Samskarika Charitthra Nigandu
- Notable awards: Ezhuthachan Puraskaram, Kerala Sahitya Akademi Award for Overall Contributions, Kerala Sahitya Akademi Award for Scholarly Literature

S. K. Vasanthan is a Malayalam history researcher, academic and writer from Kerala, India. He has published several books in various genres such as essay, novel, short story, history of Kerala and translation.

He received several awards including Ezhuthachan Puraskaram, Kerala Sahitya Akademi Award for Scholarly Literature and Kerala Sahitya Akademi Award for Overall Contributions.

== Biography ==
S. K. Vasanthan was born on 17 November 1935, at Edappally in present-day Ernakulam district to Karunakara Menon and Thathampally Saraswathi Amma. After completing post graduate degree in Malayalam and English and Phd from the University of Kerala, he taught at Kalady Sreesankara College and Sree Sankaracharya Sanskrit University for 35 years.

Chinta Publishers published his novel Ente Gramam, Ente Janatha (translated as "My Village, My People"), which won first prize in the novel competition organised by Chinta Publishers. His second novel Arakkillam was published as various parts in Mathrubhumi. Vasanthan held several positions including assistant editor at Kerala Language Institute, member of Kerala Sahitya Akademi and member of the boards of various Universities in Kerala.

He now lives in Kuriachira, Thrissur district.

== Notable works ==
- Kerala Samskarika Charitthra Nigandu (Dictionary of Cultural History of Kerala),ISBN 9788120046764
- Nammal Nadanna Vazhikal (Kerala Cultural History)
- Padinjaran Kavyameemamsa
- Kalppadukal part 1 titled as Akam, memoirs
- Kalppadukal part 2 titled as Puram, memoirs of friendships and cordial interactions with Agamananda Swamy, S. Guptan Nair, Joseph Mundassery, V. V. K. Valath, Mullanezhi, Vyloppilly, Basheer, N. V. Krishna Warrier, E. M. S. Namboodiripad, Puthezhan, M. S. Devadas, P. Govinda Pillai, Thayatt Sankaran, MRC, V. Aravindakshan, Cherukad, Chathunni Master, Dr. M. S. Menon, Jayapalan Menon, Iyyamcode Sreedharan, M. P. Manmathan, Changampuzha, E. M. Kovoor and E. K. Nayanar.
- Ente Gramam, Ente Janatha (novel)
- Translation of the book "Jean Christophe" by Romain Rolland based on the life story of Beethoven
- Arakkillam (novel)
- Appan Thampuran Oru Padanam, study on works of Appan Thampuran
- Nalappattu
- Samasta Kerala Sahithtya Parishattinte Charithram, history of Samastha Kerala Sahitya Parishad, ISBN 9788124018156
- Prasavadam
- Cherusseri Pranamam
- Pazhaya Then (collections)
- Kizhakkinte Velicham, translation of Light of Asia by Sir Edwin Arnold, ISBN 9788126424528
- Cherukadinte prathibha (editor) ISBN 9789383903917
- Kathayamama (essays)
- Vakkanavum Valarchayum: Sahithyasamvadangal (literary essays), ISBN 9789384795313
- Panchakanya Smarennithyam (stories)
- Prasavadam (editor) ISBN 9788193687727
- Koodiyalla Janikkunna Nerathum (stories) ISBN 9788122607901

== Awards and honours ==
- 2023 Ezhuthachan Puraskaram, the highest award given by the Kerala government for comprehensive contribution in the field of Malayalam literature.
- Kerala Sahitya Akademi Award for Scientific Literature 2007 for his book Kerala Samskarika Charitthra Nigandu (Dictionary of Cultural History of Kerala)
- Kerala Sahitya Akademi Award for Overall Contributions 2013
- CP Menon Award
- Akashavani Award
- Award from Kerala Sahitya Akademi in Thunchan Essay Competition
- Kerala History Association Award
- K Damodaran Award
- M. S. Menon Memorial Award
