= Vallathol Award =

Literary award

- Award for individual contributions to Malayalam literature
- Awarded for: Literary award in India
- Sponsored by: Vallathol Sahithya Samithi
- Rewards: ₹111,111 and a plaque
- First award: 1991
- Final award: 2019

Highlights
- Total awarded: 29
- First winner: Pala Narayanan Nair
- Last winner: Paul Zacharia

Vallathol Award is an annual literary award in India given by the Vallathol Sahithya Samithi for contribution to Malayalam literature. The award was instituted in 1991 in memory of Vallathol Narayana Menon, one of the modern triumvirate poets (Adhunika kavithrayam) of Malayalam poetry. The prize includes a cash prize of ₹ 111,111 and a plaque.

== Awardees ==
Year	Recipient	Ref.
1991	Pala Narayanan Nair	
1992	Sooranad Kunjan Pillai	
1993	Balamani Amma; Vaikom Muhammad Basheer	
1994	Ponkunnam Varkey	
1995	M. P. Appan	
1996	Thakazhi Sivasankara Pillai	
1997	Akkitham Achuthan Namboothiri	
1998	K. M. George	
1999	S. Guptan Nair	
2000	P. Bhaskaran	
2001	T. Padmanabhan	
2002	M. Leelavathy	
2003	Sugathakumari	
2004	Ayyappa Paniker	
2005	M. T. Vasudevan Nair	
2006	O. N. V. Kurup	
2007	Sukumar Azhikode	
2008	Puthussery Ramachandran	
2009	Kavalam Narayana Panicker	
2010	Vishnunarayanan Namboothiri	
2011	C. Radhakrishnan	
2012	Yusuf Ali Kechery	
2013	Perumbadavam Sreedharan	
2014	P. Narayana Kurup	
2015	Anand	
2016	Sreekumaran Thampi	
2017	Prabha Varma	
2018	M. Mukundan	
2019	Zacharia	
