= K. M. George (writer) =

Indian writer (1914–2002)

- Born: 20 April 1914; Edayaranmula, Travancore
- Died: 19 November 2002 (aged 88); Thiruvananthapuram
- Other name: Karimpumannil Mathai George
- Occupations: Editor; writer; literary critic; academic; Scholar
- Known for: Malayalam literature, Chief Editor of Malayalam Encyclopaedia
- Notable work: A Survey of Malayalam Literature; Western Influence on Malayalam Language & Literature; Comparative Indian Literature; Masterpieces of Indian Literature
- Awards: 2001 Padma Bhushan; 1998 Vallathol Award; 1997 Suranad Kunjan Pillai Award; 1987 Soviet Land Nehru Award; 1996 Ezhuthachan Puraskaram; 1989 Kerala Sahitya Akademi Fellowship; 1988 Padma Sri

Karimpumannil Mathai George (1914–2002), popularly known as Dr. K. M. George, was an eminent Malayalam writer and educator. An erudite scholar and literary critic with astute organisational capabilities, he is best known as a pioneer of Comparative Indian Studies and Literatures. He was a recipient of the fourth highest Indian civilian honour, the Padma Shri, the highest literary award of the Government of Kerala, the Ezhuthachan Puraskaram and the third highest Indian civilian award, the Padma Bhushan, besides other honours.

== Biography ==
K. M. George was born on 20 April 1914 at Edayaranmula, Travancore in the present-day Pathanamthitta district of the south Indian state of Kerala, to Kurien Mathai and Mariamma. After schooling at Malakkara Primary School, Edayaranmula Marthoma School and St. Thomas School, Kozhenchery, he passed the intermediate course from Madras Christian College (MCC) before graduating in Mathematics from the Union Christian College, Aluva. Starting his career as a lecturer at his alma mater, MCC, he continued his studies and secured a master's degree in Malayalam literature from the University of Madras in 1941. He was a visiting professor at the Indian Institute of Advanced Study, Shimla, and at Chicago and California Universities. He was also a Senior Specialist at the East–West Center, Hawaii, engaged in research on the impact of the West on Indian writing. He was associated with Sahitya Akademi (Indian Academy of Letters) right from its inception and was the Secretary of its Southern Region. He was also the vice president of Kerala Sahitya Akademi (Kerala Academy of Letters).

George was married to Eliyamma, the marriage taking place in 1944. He died on 19 November 2002, at Thiruvananthapuram. at the age of 88.

== Writing ==
His writings encompass various aspects in literature. He was a learned writer of articles in the media, father of the encyclopaedia in Kerala, editor of Indian literature, researcher of place names of Southern India, travel writer (having travelled the world over), dramatist, biographer, literary critic and auto biographer. Equally well versed in English and in Malayalam, he had a good knowledge of many Indian languages. He has published more than 50 works, translated some works to Malayalam and edited more than 10 great anthologies. He authored some of the authoritative books on the history of Malayalam literature in English such as A Survey of Malayalam Literature (1968) and Western Influence on Malayalam Language and Literature (1972). His other works in English include Ramacharitam and the Study of Early Malayalam, which is his doctoral thesis in the field of Dravidian Linguistics, and American Lives through Indian Eyes, an account of the American way of life. He also wrote travelogues about his journeys to the Soviet Union and the United States. He was also the chief editor of Malayalam Encyclopaedia and Comparative Indian Literature.

== Awards and honours ==
- The Soviet Land Nehru Award in 1987 shared with P. N. Haksar and R. K. Narayan
- The Padma Sri in 1988
- The Padma Bhushan in 2001
- The Ezhuthachan Puraskaram in 1996 (the highest literary award given by the Government of Kerala)
- The Suranad Kunjan Pillai Award in 1997
- The Vallathol Award in 1998
- The Kerala Sahitya Akademi Fellowship in 1989
- Emeritus Fellowship from the Central Government
- Sahitya Ratna Puraskaram – the highest award given by the Mar Thoma Church

The Government of Kerala has established a research centre in his honour, the Dr. K. M. George Study and Research Centre, for facilitating research on literature and other educational matters.

== Bibliography ==
=== Authored works ===
- Vedapusthakamahathmyam (1935)
- Saadhu Kochunju (1947)
- Ekaanka Mandalam (1947)
- Radio natakankal (1947)
- Prabandhachandrika (1953)
- Munthirichaaru (1950)
- Sardar Patel (1950)
- Vicharakowthukam (1952)
- America – ChilaVasthuthakal (1953)
- Edward Jenner (1954) (Translation)
- Janangalude Bharanam (1954)
- Valarunna Kairali (1954)
- Nirikshana Nilayam (1955)
- Thathvavignanathil Punarnirmaanam (1955)
- Snehathinte Shiksha (1955) (Translation of Tagore’s "The Wreck")
- Ramacaritham and the study of early Malayalam (1956)
- 9 Radio Natakankal (1957)
- Samskara Sarani (1957)
- Thoreau (1962) (Translation)
- Tagore (1962) (Translation)
- Indiacharithrathile Bhoomishastrakadakangal (1962)
- Jeevacharithra Sahityam (1964)
- Soviet Naattil 3 Aazhcha (1964)
- Americayil Poyakatha (1967)
- American Life Through Indian Eyes (1967)
- A survey of Malayalam literature. Bombay: Asia Pub. House. 1968. ISBN 0210227354. OCLC 32189.
- Malayalam Grammar and Reader (1971)
- Western influence on Malayalam language and literature. New Delhi: Sahitya Akademi. 1972. ISBN 8126004134. OCLC 1084351.
- Kumaran Asan (1972)
- Avalokanangal (1978)
- Tamizh Sahityam (1977)
- A.R.Raja Raja Varma (1979)
- Bharathathile Bhashakal (1979) – Children’s literature
- Anveshanangal Padanangal (1980)
- Amercayile Anubhavangal (1980-Abridged edition)
- Sahitya Vignanavum Vignanasahityavum (1983)
- Aartha Maanavu Thalamurakalilude (1985-tr. of Maxim Gorky)
- Enneaakarshicha Prathibhashalikal (1985)
- Bharathiya Sahitya Pattanam (1985)
- Place Names of Southern India (1986)
- Kavikal Nirupanarangathu (1986)
- Kesari Balakrishna Pillai (1989)
- K M Georginte Prabhandangal (1989)
- Soviet NaattilVeendum (1989)
- Arivukal Avalokanangal (1991)
- Veekshanangal Vichinthanangal (1991)
- A Many Branched Tree (1991)
- Renaissance in Indian Literature and its Social Implications (1991)
- Mookanarthakan (Translation of play by Asif Currimbhoy – 1991)
- Facets of Indian Literature (1994)
- Bharathiya Sahitya Sameeksha (1994)
- Enne Njan Kaanumbol (1999)
- The Role of Sanskrit in the development of Dravidian Literature (2000)

=== Edited works ===
- Sahitya Charitram Prasthanangalilude. S.P.C.S. 1958.
- Adhunika Sahitya Charitram Prasthanangalilude. DC Books. 1998.
- Sarvavignanakosham volumes 1&2
- Mahakavi Ulloor
- Bharathiya Sahitya Charithram 2vols.
- Comparative Indian Literature 2vols.(1984)
- Modern Indian Literature, an Anthology: Surveys and poems. Sahitya Akademi. 1992. ISBN 978-81-7201-324-0.
- Modern Indian Literature, an Anthology: Fiction. Sahitya Akademi. 1992. ISBN 978-81-7201-324-0.
- Modern Indian Literature, an Anthology: Surveys and poems. Sahitya Akademi. 1992. ISBN 978-81-7201-324-0.
- Masterpieces of Indian Literature – 3 vols.
- Aadhunika Malayala Sahitya Charitram Prasthanangalilude
- Commonwealth Literature – Themes & Techniques
- The best of Thakazhi Sivasankara Pillai

== See also ==
- List of Malayalam-language authors by category
- List of Malayalam-language authors
