= Kovilan =

Indian writer (1923–2010)

V. V. Ayyapan
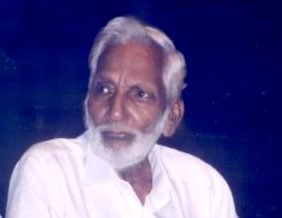
- Born: Kandanissery Vattamparambil Velappan Ayyappan; 9 July 1923; Kandanassery, Guruvayur, Thrissur, Kingdom of Cochin, British India
- Died: 2 June 2010 (aged 86); Kunnamkulam, Thrissur, Kerala, India
- Citizenship: Indian
- Education: Kandanisseri Excelsior School Nenmini Higher Elementary School Sahitya Deepika Sanskrit College at Pavaratty
- Occupations: Writer, soldier, freedom fighter
- Writing career
- Pen name: Kovilan
- Language: Malayalam
- Genres: Novel, short story, essay
- Notable works: Ezhamedangal, Thottangal, Thattakam
- Notable awards: Kerala Sahitya Akademi Award; 1972 Thottangal Kerala Sahitya Akademi Award; 1977 Sakunam; Kerala Sahitya Akademi Fellowship; 1997; Sahitya Akademi Award; 1998 Thattakam; Sahitya Akademi Fellowship; 2005 Ezhuthachan Puraskaram; 2005

Kandanisseri Vattamparambil Velappan Ayyappan (9 July 1923 – 2 June 2010) or V. V. Ayyappan, better known by his pen name Kovilan, was an Indian Malayalam language novelist and freedom fighter from Kerala. He is considered one of the most prolific writers of contemporary Indian literature. In all, he had authored 11 novels, 10 collections of short stories, three essays and a play.

He won the Kerala Sahitya Akademi Award in 1972 and 1977 and the Kendra Sahitya Akademi Award in 1998. He was also a recipient of the Kerala state government's highest literary honour Ezhuthachan Puraskaram in recognition of his outstanding contribution to Malayalam literature. He had been a Fellow of the Kerala Sahitya Akademi since 1997 and Sahitya Akademi since 2005.

== Life ==
=== Early years ===
Kovilan was born in Kandanassery in Guruvayur, Thrissur to Vattomparambil Shanku Velappan and Kotakkattil Kunjandi Kali. He did his early education at the Kandanisseri Excelsior School and Nenmini Higher Elementary School. He then joined the Sahitya Deepika Sanskrit College at Pavaratty at the age of 13. He attended classes of K. P. Narayana Pisharody, P. C. Vasudevan Elayathu, M. P. Sankunni Nair, Cherukadu and Srikrishna Sharma. Even as a student, he had shown interest in writing poems and stories.

A follower of Mahatma Gandhi, Kovilan left the Sanskrit College to participate in the Quit India Movement. That marked the end of his formal academic education. By the time he quit, he had written at least three novels.

=== Military life ===
He joined the Royal Indian Navy in 1943 and was trained in Anti-submarine Detecting Operations. He served in Bengal sea, Burma and Singapore. He quit following the Royal Indian Navy mutiny of 1946 and returned home. While back in Kerala, Kovilan maintained a close friendship with Vaikom Muhammed Basheer, Joseph Mundassery and C. J. Thomas. He also took part in the trade union movements. In 1948 he passed SSLC and worked for a while as a stenographer for Joseph Mundassery. In 1948, he joined the Indian Army Corps of Signals as Radio Mechanic. He also specialised in electronics. For five years he lived in the Himalayas. While in army, he came in contact with soldier-turned-writers Parappurath and Nandanar (author). He also worked as National Cadet Corps training officer at the Indian Institute of Technology, Kanpur. He retired from the Indian Army in 1968 as Havildar Major and settled down at Pullanikunnu at Kandanassery.

=== Death ===
Kovilan died on 2 June 2010 in Kunnamkulam, aged 86.

== Writings ==
Kovilan has written 4 novels—A Minus B (1958), Ezhamedangal (Army Wives, 1965), Thazhvarakal (The Valleys, 1969) and Himalayam—with military experiences as their background.

Thottangal (Incantations, 1970), the first post-service novel of the writer, narrates the delirious memories of an old woman in the night of her death whose life was shipwrecked turning the dreams of her childhood into nightmares.

His most popular novel was Thattakam (The Terrain, 1995).

Kovilan's first collection of short stories was Oru Palam Manayola (A Measure of Red Arsenic). This book was published in the year 1957. The story Tharavadu (Ancestral Home) is included in this collection. Kovilan's other collections of short stories include Ee Jeevitham Ananthamanu (1957), Orikkal Manushyanayirunnu (1960), Oru Kashanam Asthi (1961), Vendam Kadi (1969), Thervazhchakal (1971), Pitham (1971), Shakunam (1974), Adyathe Kathakal (1978), Sujatha (1979), Theranjedutha Kathakal (1980) and Kovilante Kathakal (1985). A tele-serial based on his novel Thottangal was beamed on Doordarshan. Some of his short stories also have been adapted for tele-screen.

== Style and recurring themes ==
According to one source, Kovilan's works contributed to transforming a community bogged down by conservatism to one that was progressive and socialist in outlook.

Poet and critic K. Satchidanandan notes:

He wrote pure prose, not poetic prose. In an era when prose writers revelled in poetic expressions, Kovilan wrote a prose that was plain and lean. Its beauty was raw and unadorned. Though Kovilan's works were initially categorised as Pattala Sahityam or soldier's writings, it was clear after the publication of Thattakam and Thottangal that they were more than that. Writers seek legends. Kovilan realised that there is a legend behind every man. He sought to document this. He explored the legends of his village. His stories bridged local and regional history.

== Awards ==
- 1971: Kerala Sahitya Akademi Award (Novel) for Thottangal
- 1977: Kerala Sahitya Akademi Award (Story) for Sakunam
- 1995: Muttathu Varkey Award
- 1997: Kerala Sahitya Akademi Fellowship
- 1997: A. P. Kulakkad Award for Thattakam
- 1998: Kendra Sahitya Academy Award for Thattakam
- 1998: Kerala Sahitya Parishath Award for Thattakam
- 1999: Vayalar Award for Thattakam
- 1999: N. V. Prize for Thattakam
- 2004: Sahitya Akademi Fellowship
- 2006: Ezhuthachan Award
- 2008: Mathrubhumi Literary Award

== Bibliography ==
=== Novels ===
| Title | Title in English | Year | Publisher |
|---|---|---|---|
| Thakarnna Hridayangal | Broken Hearts | 1946 | Arunodayam Press, Vadakkencherry |
| A Minus B | | 1958 | Current Books, Thrissur |
| Ezhamedangal | Army Wives | 1965 | Current Books, Thrissur |
| Thazhvarakal | The Valleys | 1969 | Current Books, Thrissur |
| Thottanngal | Incantations | 1970 | Current Books, Thrissur |
| Himalayam | The Himalayas | 1972 | Current Books, Thrissur |
| Bharathan | | 1976 | Poorna Publications, Calicut |
| Janmantharanngal | Through Many Births | 1982 | Sahithya Pravarthaka Co-operative Society, Kottayam |
| Thattakam | The Terrain | 1995 | Current Books, Thrissur |

=== Novelettes ===
| Title | Title in English | Year | Publisher |
|---|---|---|---|
| Board Out | | 1936 | Current Books, Thrissur |
| Tharavadu | The Ancestral Home | 1963 | Current Books, Thrissur |

=== Short stories ===
| Title | Title in English | Year | Publisher |
|---|---|---|---|
| Oru Palam Manayola | A Measure of Red Arsenic | 1957 | Current Books, Thrissur |
| Ee Jeevitham Anadhamanu | This Life is Orphaned | 1957 | Current Books, Thrissur |
| Orikkal Manushyanayirunnu | Once a Man I was... | 1960 | Current Books, Thrissur |
| Oru Kashanam Asthi | A Piece of Bone | 1961 | Current Books, Thrissur |
| Vendamkadi | The Unwanted | 1969 | Current Books, Thrissur |
| Thervazchakal | Apparitions | 1971 | Current Books, Thrissur |
| Pitham | The Bilious Child | 1971 | Current Books, Thrissur |
| Sujatha | | 1971 | Poorna Publications, Calicut |
| Sakunam | The Omen | 1974 | Sahithya Pravarthaka Co-operative Society, Kottayam |
| Adyathe Kathakal | Stories of Early Days | 1978 | Sahithya Pravarthaka Co-operative Society, Kottayam |
| Theranjedutha Kathakal | Selected Stories | 1980 | Sahithya Pravarthaka Co-operative Society, Kottayam |
| Kovilante Kathakal | Stories of Kovilan | 1985 | Current Books, Thrissur |
| Suvarna Kathakal | Golden Stories | 2002 | Green Books, Thrissur |
| Ente Priyappetta Kathakal | My Favourite Stories | 2003 | DC Books, Kottayam |

=== Play ===
| Title | Title in English | Year | Publisher |
|---|---|---|---|
| Ninte Viswasam Ninne Poruppikkum | Your Faith Ensures What Happens to You | 1957 | Current Books, Thrissur |

=== Miscellaneous writings ===
| Title | Title in English | Year | Publisher |
|---|---|---|---|
| Kovilante Lekhanangal | Essays of Kovilan | 1984 | Sikha Publications, Calicut |
| Kathayum Kathakalum | Stories Behind the Stories | 1957 | Poorna Publications, Calicut |
| Athmabhavangal | Self Reflections | 1995 | Jwala, Ariyannur, Thrissur |
