= Sethu (writer) =

Indian writer

A.Sethumadhavan
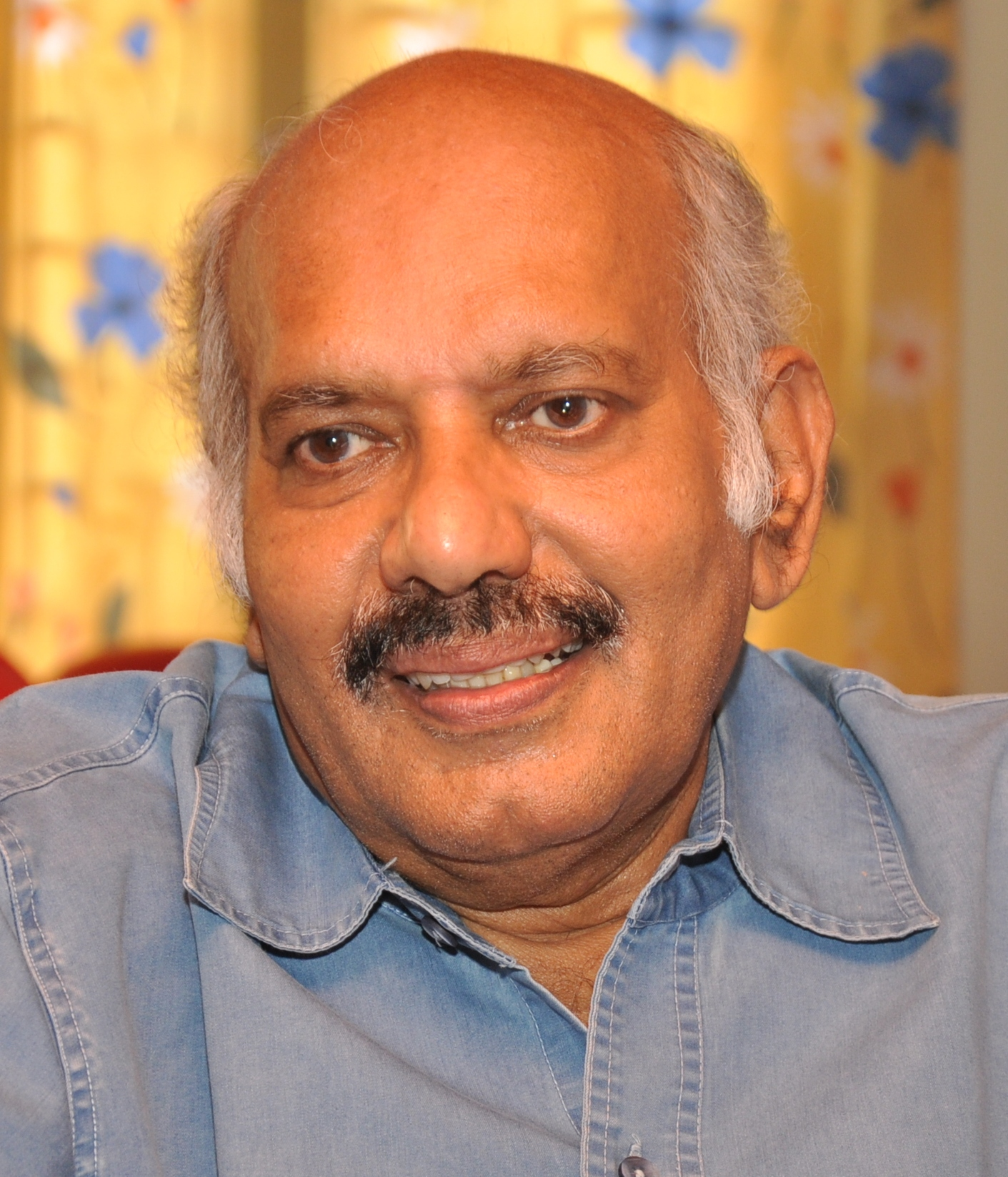
- Born: 5 June 1942 (age 84); Chendamangalam, Ernakulam district, Kerala, India
- Education: UC College, Aluva
- Occupations: Writer, banker
- Writing career
- Pen name: Sethu
- Period: 1956–1960
- Genres: Novel, short story, essays
- Website: Sethu.org

A. Sethumadhavan (born 5 June 1942), popularly known as Sethu, is a Malayalam fiction writer. He has published more than 40 books. He won the Kendra Sahitya Akademi Award in 2007 for the work Adayalangal. He received the Kerala Sahitya Akademi Awards in 1982 and 1978 for his works Pandavapuram and Pediswapnangal; and Vayalar Award for Adyalangal in 2006. He also won Odakkuzhal award for his novel Marupiravi. He also served as the chairman and CEO of the South Indian Bank. In 2022, he won the Ezhuthachan Puraskaram, highest literary honour of the Kerala Sahitya Akademi.

== Life ==
Sethu was born in Chendamangalam, a village in Ernakulam district, in the year 1942. He had his school education at Paliam High School, Chendamangalam, and took his bachelor's degree in physics from the Union Christian College, Aluva, at the age of 18.

Sethu began his professional career at a young age taking him to various parts of the country. This phase of his life was instrumental in shaping his literary sensibilities and came to be reflected in his works.

He worked in certain Central Government departments in North India before joining the Indian Meteorological Department in Bombay in 1962. In 1964 he took a transfer to Trivandrum and worked in the Meteorological Unit of the Thumba Equatorial Rocket Launching Station. Subsequently, he was promoted and posted to the newly established Institute of Tropical Meteorology in Pune. Then he worked in Railway Board, New Delhi for a couple of years before switching over to the banking industry in 1968. He joined the banking profession as a Probationary Officer in the State Bank Group. After holding important positions in the Group, he took over as General Manager in the Corporation Bank and later as the Chairman of the South Indian Bank, a major private sector bank of the country. He served as the chairman and Chief Executive Officer of SIB from 1999 until his retirement in 2005. He was also on the board of the State Bank of Travancore for a period of three years after his retirement.

He had attended many international conferences both on banking and literature in various countries.

In 2012 September, he replaced historian Bipan Chandra to become the chairman of National Book Trust, New Delhi. In 2015 March, the National Democratic Alliance government removed him from the post in an ignominious manner, six months before his tenure was due to end. Sethu was replaced by Baldevbhai Sharma, former editor of the Rashtriya Swayamsevak Sangh mouthpiece Panchjanya.

== Writing ==
He had written his first short story in the attic of a Karol Bagh house in Delhi in the year 1967. He says, "It [the story] was about the severe drought in Bihar. After a visit to the worst-hit areas and scenes of human suffering I wrote the story without knowing anything about the craft of writing and it was published in the Mathrubhumi Weekly by its legendary editor and writer M. T. Vasudevan Nair.".

Sethu is one of the pioneers of modern Malayalam fiction who brought about a radical transformation of sensibility through his writings during the sixties and early seventies. In a literary career spanning nearly six decades, Sethu wrote over 22 novels, 20 collections of short stories and four children's books. Many of his novels and stories have been translated into English and other Indian languages. His novel Pandavapuram has been translated into 10 languages including English, French, German and Turkish apart from Hindi, Tamil, Telugu, Kannada, Oriya and Marathi. His works include Pandavapuram, Niyogam, Kaimudrakal, Vilayattam, Atayalangal, Kilimozhikalkkappuram, Aramathe Penkutti, Marupiravi, Aliya, Kilikkoodu and Anthakavallikal (novels), Petiswapnangal, Doothu, Chilakalangalil Chila Gayathrimar, Arundhathiyute Virunnukaran and Sethuvinte Kathakal (short stories), and Sanidasa, Yathrakidayil (essays).

His novel Aliya (2013) on the migration of Jews is one of the path-breaking novels in Malayalam. His later novel The Cuckoo's Nest is the story of Madam Agatha, a former devout nun who, after renouncing the order, decides to take up the cudgels for the cause of tolerance and pluralism. She decides to set up a unique institution called 'Nest' for empowering the hapless girls from all over the country, discarded by society. The paramount condition set by her is that none of the resident girls will be allowed to talk of their religion or caste inside the campus. The novelist attempts to portray the kind of challenges she has to face from vested interests all around while working towards secularism, and how she manages to swim against the tide. His latest novel Anthakavallikal ( Invasive Creepers) is on the subject of environmental concerns and the importance of organic farming. He has also written a children's novel Ilakalum Pookkalum (Leaves and Flowers) on the importance of organic farming.

Sethu has been honoured with many prestigious awards including the Ezhuthachan Award, Kendra Sahitya Akademi Award, Kerala Sahitya Akademi Award for both novel and short story, Vayalar Award, Odakkuzhal Award, Mathrubhumi Award and Muttathu Varkey Award. Four of his works have been made into films including Pandavapuram, which was also made into Bengali titled Nirakar Chhaya.

== Works ==
=== Novel ===
- Njangal Adimakal (ഞങ്ങൾ അടിമകൾ)
- Ariyatha Vazhikal (അറിയാത്ത വഴികൾ)
- Kiratham (കിരാതം)
- Thaliyola (താളിയോല)
- Pandavapuram (പാണ്ഡവപുരം)
- Niyogam (നിയോഗം)
- Navagrahangalude Thatavara (നവഗ്രഹങ്ങളുടെ തടവറ) (with Punathil Kunjabdulla)
- Vanavasam (വനവാസം)
- Vilayattom (വിളയാട്ടം)
- Ezham Pakkam (ഏഴാം പക്കം)
- Kaimudrakal (കൈമുദ്രകൾ)
- Kaiyoppum Kaivazhikalum (കൈയൊപ്പും കൈവഴികളും)
- Atayalangal (അടയാളങ്ങൾ)
- Kilimozhikalkkappuram (കിളിമൊഴികൾക്കപ്പുറം)
- Marupiravi (മറുപിറവി)
- Aaliya (ആലിയ)
- Kilikkoodu
- Parvathi
- Anthakavallikal

=== Short story ===
- Thinkalazhchakalile Aakasam (തിങ്കളാഴ്ചകളിലെ ആകാശം)
- Velutha Koodarangal (വെളുത്ത കൂടാരങ്ങൾ)
- Aswinathile Pookkal (ആശ്വിനത്തിലെ പൂക്കൾ)
- Prakasathinte Uravidom (പ്രകാശത്തിന്റെ ഉറവിടം)
- Pampum Koniyum (പാമ്പും കോണിയും)
- Pediswapnangal (പേടിസ്വപ്നങ്ങൾ)
- Arundhatiyude Virunnukaran (അരുന്ധതിയുടെ വിരുന്നുകാരൻ)
- Doothu (ദൂത്)
- Guru (ഗുരു)
- Prahelika Kantam (പ്രഹേളികാകാണ്ഡം)
- Ambulance
- Kanthabai Karayarilla

=== Children's Books ===
- Chekkutti
- Appuvum Achuvum
- Ananthuvinte Charithranveshanangal
- Ilakalum Pookkalum

English Translations

- Pandavapuram
- Wind from the Hills
- Saga of Muziris
- Aliya, the last Jew in the Village
- During the Journey and Other Stories (Stories)
- Once Upon a Time
- A Guest for Arundhathi (Stories)
- Kadambari, the Flower Girl
- Jalasamadhi and other stories (Stories)

== Awards ==
- 1978: Kerala Sahitya Akademi Award for Story – Petiswapnangal
- 1982: Kerala Sahitya Akademi Award for Novel – Pandavapuram
- 1989: Viswadeepam Award – Niyogam
- 1994: Padmarajan Award – Uyarangalil
- 1999: Malayattoor Award – Kaimudrakal
- 1997: Kerala State Film Award for Best Story – Poothiruvathira Ravil (based on novel Njangal Adimakal)
- 2006: Vayalar Award – Atayalangal
- 2003: Muttathu Varkey Award – Pandavapuram
- 2006: Pravasi Kairali Sahitya Puraskaram
- 2007: Kendra Sahitya Akademi Award – Atayalangal
- 2009: Shortlisted for Crossword Book Award – The Wind from the Hills (English translation of the novel Niyogam)
- 2011: Bahrain Keraleeya Samajam Award
- 2012: Thrissur Souhrudavedi Award
- 2013: Odakkuzhal Award – Marupiravi
- 2020:Kerala Sahitya Akademi Fellowship
- 2020: Abu Dhabi Sakthi Award for Children's Literature – Appuvum Achuvum
- 2021 Sahithya Parishad Puraskaram
- 2022:Ezhuthachan Puraskaram
- 2022:Mathrubhumi Literary Award
