= Maythil Radhakrishnan =

Indian writer (born 1944)

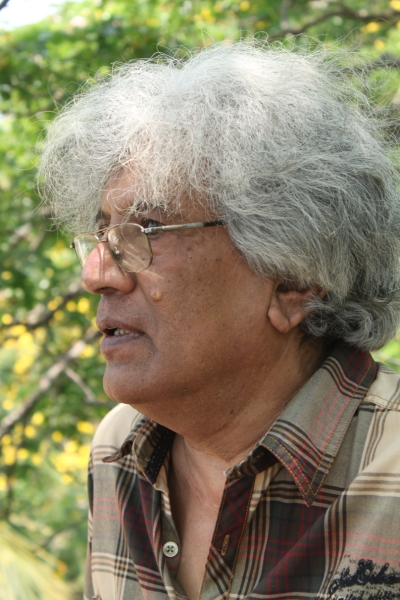
- Born: 24 July 1944 (age 82); Kerala, India
- Education: University of Kerala
- Occupation: Writer
- Children: 2
- Relatives: Methil Devika (niece)
- Writing career
- Language: Malayalam and English
- Years active: 1970–present
- Genres: Poetry; Fiction; Non fiction
- Notable awards: Ezhuthachan Puraskaram; Mathrubhumi Literary Award

Maythil Radhakrishnan aka Rad Maythil is an all-rounder in Malayalam literature, who writes poetry and fiction as well as non-fiction. He was chosen for the Kerala Sahitya Akademi Award for Overall Contributions in 2016 which he refused.

== Biography ==
Maythil graduated in Economics from the University of Kerala in 1968. For the next eight years, he researched insect ethology, while working as a freelance journalist.

From 1976 to 1984 he worked in Kuwait for a Norwegian shipping firm as EDP Coordinator. For the next three years, he ran his own computer aided design and drafting center in Coimbatore, Tamil Nadu. Since 1987, except for a four-year stint as Editor for Youth Express of The New Indian Express (then The Indian Express) group, at Thiruvananthapuram and Chennai, Maythil has spent his time mostly in writing; on occasions working as a freelance journalist, quizmaster and a web developer.

He writes popular columns in The Sunday Express (Zebra Crossing, now available online as a social network created by the author) and in Madhyamam Weekly (Moonnu Vara a.k.a. Three Stripes).

Presently, he lives in Thiruvananthapuram. He is a widower and has a daughter named June and a son named Julian. June died on February 13, 2025.

== Writing ==
Maythil's first novel, Sooryavamsam, published in 1970, announced the arrival of a major talent in Malayalam literature. Four novels and many stories and poems later, his is still a fresh voice. His oeuvre reflects the whole gamut of unrelated experience—from computers to insects—that he had acquired. The essence of his writing is summed up by K. Satchidanandan in the following words:

There are very few in Indian fiction who can compare with this author in artistic innovation, intellectual subtlety and original perception of things and of life. The three novellas here represent all that is newest in Indian fiction.

Maythil was awarded the 2015 annual award for his contributions to Malayalam literature by Kerala Sahitya Akademi in 2016 which he refused, citing his distrust in academies. He received Mathrubhumi Literary Award for the year 2025. In 2026 he was selected for the Ezhuthachan Puraskaram, the highest literary honour of the Kerala Government.

== Bibliography ==
=== Novels ===
- Sooryavamsam (Sun Dynasty), novel, 1970
- Bra, novel, 1974
- Chuvanna Vidooshakarute Anchampathi (Fifth Column of the Red Jesters), novel, 1974
- Hitchcockinte Itapetal (Hitchcock's Intervention), novel, 1994
- Laingikathayekkurichu Oru Upanyasam (An Essay on Sexuality), novel, 1995

=== Poetry ===
- Penguin, poems, 1973
- Bhoomiyeyum Maranatheyum Kurichu (Of The Earth and Death), poems, 1991

=== Short fiction ===
- Naayakanmaar Shavapetakangalil (Heroes in Coffins), Short stories, 1994
- Dylan Thomasinte Panth, (The Ball of Dylan Thomas) Short stories, 1994
- Sangeetham Oru Samayakalayaanu (Music Is A Time-art), Short stories, 1995
- Sooryamalsyathe vivarikkal(Describing the Sunfish), Novella, 2017

=== Collected works in English ===
- The Love Song of Alfred Hitchcock, 2004

(Translated by VC Harris)

=== Collected works in Malayalam ===
- Maythil Kathakal, Published by Mathrubhumi Books, 2013
- Maythil Radhakrishnan - Pratikathakal: Vimatam, Published by DC Books, 2003

=== Non-fiction (Science) ===
- Romam (Hair), 1981
- Daivam, Manushyan, Yanthram (God, Man and Machine) 2001
