= Asan Smaraka Kavitha Puraskaram =

- Award for individual contributions to Malayalam literature
- Awarded for: Literary award in India
- Sponsored by: ASAN Memorial Association, Chennai
- Rewards: ₹50,000, citation, memento
- First award: 1985
- Final award: 2024

Highlights
- Total awarded: 36
- First winner: C. Mani
- Last winner: V. M. Girija
- Website: asaneducation.com/asan_association

Asan Memorial Poetry Prize or Asan Smaraka Kavitha Puraskaram is a literary award instituted in 1985 by Madras-based Asan Memorial Association in memory of Malayalam poet Kumaran Asan. It is given annually to honour outstanding poets in Malayalam language. The award comprises a purse of Rs 50,000, sculpture and certificate. The award was also conferred on Tamil writers in its initial years.

== Recipients ==
- 1985: C. Mani
- 1986: N. N. Kakkad
- 1987: Sundara Ramaswamy
- 1988: Yusufali Kechery
- 1989: Soundara Kailasam
- 1990: Sugathakumari
- 1992: P. Bhaskaran
- 1993: O. N. V. Kurup
- 1994: Akkitham Achuthan Namboothiri
- 1995: Kadammanitta Ramakrishnan
- 1996: Vishnunarayanan Namboothiri
- 1997: Attoor Ravi Varma
- 1998: Olappamanna
- 1999: Ayyappa Paniker
- 2000: K. Satchidanandan
- 2001: Pala Narayanan Nair
- 2002: M. P. Appan
- 2003: V. Madhusoodhanan Nair
- 2004: K. G. Sankara Pillai
- 2005: Kilimanoor Ramakanthan
- 2006: D. Vinayachandran
- 2007: Madhavan Ayyappath
- 2008: Puthussery Ramachandran
- 2009: M. N. Paloor
- 2010: A. Ayyappan
- 2011: S. Ramesan Nair
- 2012: Sreekumaran Thampi
- 2013: N. K. Desam
- 2014: Prabha Varma
- 2015: Chemmanam Chacko
- 2016: Ezhachery Ramachandran
- 2018: Desamangalam Ramakrishnan
- 2019: S. Rameshan
- 2020: Puthussery Ramachandran
- 2021: K. Jayakumar
- 2022: Kureepuzha Sreekumar
- 2024: V. M. Girija

== See also ==
- List of Malayalam literary awards
