= M. P. Appan =

Poet/littérateur of Malayalam

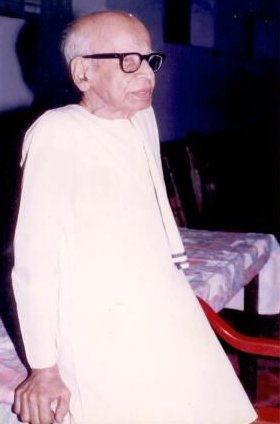
- Born: 29 March 1913; Jagathi, Thiruvananthapuram district, British Raj
- Died: 10 December 2003 (aged 90)

Mahakavi M. P. Appan (29 March 1913 – 10 December 2003) was a poet and littérateur of Malayalam.

== Biography ==
He was born in 1913 near Jagathi in Thiruvananthapuram district. His parents were Madu and Kochappi. His original name was Ponnappan. He began his career as a school teacher after completing BA Honours from the Kerala University College, Trivandrum. He retired as the District Educational Officer. He had his imprint in the literary field for over 70 years. He was the president of Asan Memorial in Thonnakkal and Mahakavi Ulloor Memorial in Jagathi. He was also a member of the Kerala Sahitya Academy from 1957 to 1967.

Appan was one of the few poets of the modern era to be conferred the prefix "Mahakavi" which means "great poet". He published around 50-odd poetry collections. Some of his works include Suvarnodayam (1936), Vellinakshathram (1939), Leela Soudham (1955), Kilikkonchal (1954), Soundaryadhara (1958), Udyanasoonam (1972), Satyadarsanam (1980) and Jeevithasayahnathil (1986). He won the Kerala Sahitya Akademi Award for Udyanasoonam in 1973. In 1998, he received the Ezhuthachan Award which is Kerala's highest literary honour.

== Awards ==
Honorary

- 1989: Sahitya Kalanidhi title by Kerala Hindi Prachar Sabha
- 1994: D.Litt by University of Kerala

Literary awards

- 1973: Kerala Sahitya Akademi Award (for Udyana Soonam)
- 1987: Asan Prize
- 1994: Guru Chengannur Award
- 1995: Vallathol Award
- 1998: Ezhuthachan Award
- 2003: Ulloor Award
