= Ezhuthachan Puraskaram =

- Award for individual contributions to Malayalam literature
- Awarded for: Literary award in India
- Sponsored by: Kerala Sahitya Akademi
- Rewards: ₹ 5,00,000 and a citation
- First award: 1993
- Final award: 2026

Highlights
- Total awarded: 33
- First winner: Sooranad Kunjan Pillai
- Last winner: Maythil Radhakrishnan

The Ezhuthachan Puraskaram is the highest literary honour given by the Kerala Sahitya Akademi, Government of Kerala. The annual award is named after Thunchaththu Ezhuthachan, the father of the Malayalam language, and consists of a cash prize of ₹ 500,000 and a citation. The prize money was enhanced by ₹ 50,000 in 2011. The award was instituted in 1993 and Sooranad Kunjan Pillai was its first recipient.

== List of winners ==
The following are the winners of the Ezhuthachan Puraskaram.

Year	Awardee	Image
1993	Sooranad Kunjan Pillai	
1994	Thakazhi Sivasankara Pillai	
1995	Balamaniamma	
1996	K. M. George	
1997	Ponkunnam Varkey	
1998	M. P. Appan	
1999	K. P. Narayana Pisharody	
2000	Pala Narayanan Nair	
2001	O. V. Vijayan	
2002	Kamala Surayya	
2003	T. Padmanabhan	
2004	Sukumar Azhikkode	
2005	S. Guptan Nair	
2006	V. V. Ayyappan (Kovilan)	
2007	O. N. V. Kurup	
2008	Akkitham Achuthan Namboothiri	
2009	Sugathakumari	
2010	M. Leelavathi	
2011	M. T. Vasudevan Nair	
2012	Attoor Ravi Varma	
2013	M. K. Sanu	
2014	Vishnunarayanan Namboothiri	
2015	Puthussery Ramachandran	
2016	C. Radhakrishnan	
2017	K. Satchidanandan	
2018	M. Mukundan	
2019	Anand	
2020	Zacharia	
2021	P. Valsala	
2022	Sethu	
2023	S. K. Vasanthan	
2024	N. S. Madhavan	
2025	K. G. Sankara Pillai	
2026	Maythil Radhakrishnan	
