= Puthussery Ramachandran =

Indian poet (1928–2020)

Puthussery Ramachandran Pillai
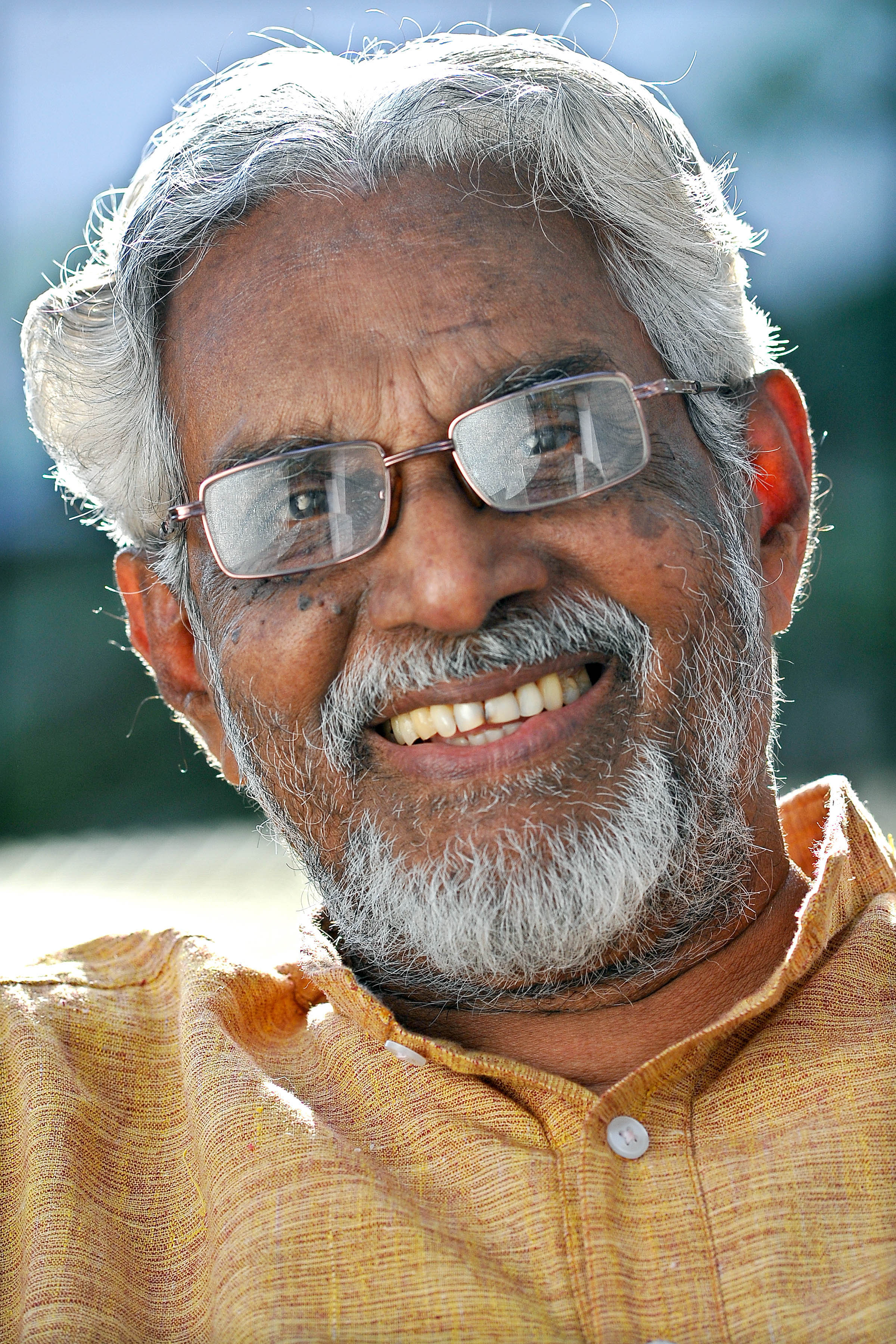
- Born: 23 September 1928; Mavelikkara, Travancore
- Died: 14 March 2020 (aged 91); Thiruvananthapuram, Kerala
- Occupations: Poet, professor
- Notable work: Grameena Gayakan, Aavunnathra Uchchathil, Puthiyakollanum Puthiyoralayum, Utsavabali, Kannassa Ramayanam, Keralcharitrathinte Adisthanarekhakal

Puthussery Ramachandran Pillai (23 September 1928 – 14 March 2020) was an Indian poet of the Malayalam language. He was a scholar of Dravidian linguistics and a professor of Malayalam for more than three decades. On 14 March 2020, he died of age-related illnesses.

== Career ==
Ramachandran completed his B.A (Honors) with first rank from the University College, Trivandrum in 1956. He joined S.N. College, Kollam as lecturer in 1957 and later became the Professor in Malayalam. Ramachandran was a member of the Syndicate of the University of Kerala and was the General Secretary of First World Conference on Malayalam language and Kerala Culture organised by the University of Kerala in 1977. He was the Organizing Secretary of the First All India Conference on Dravidian Linguistics in 1971.

== Poetry ==
Ramachandran's literary efforts were recognised by the Sahitya Akademi, who gave him their national award for translation. In 2009 Kerala Sahitya Akademi conferred him with a fellowship, the most distinguished honour of the Academy. He did much to promote Malayalam language and literature. On the basis of the document prepared and submitted by Government of Kerala with his guidance and leadership, Malayalam was recognised as a classical language by the Government of India in 2013.

In recognition of his contributions to the studies on Early and Medieval Malayalam language and literature, the Sahitya Akademi selected him for the Bhasha Samman in 2014.

== Bibliography ==
The following is a list of his works:

=== Poetry ===
- Ente Swathantryasamara Kavithakal (Poems written for India's Freedom Struggle), 1948 (Reprint 1998)
- Grameena Gayakan (1948)
- Aavunnathra Uchchathil (1954)
- Puthiyakollanum Puthiyoralayum (1960)
- Sakthipooja (1965)
- Akalumthorum (1970)
- Agnaye Swaha (1988)
- Puthusseri Ramachandrante Kavithakal (Selected Poems) (1988)
- Utsavabali (1998)
- Ee Veettil Aarumille (2003)
- Puthusserikkavithakal (Complete poetical works) (2008)

=== Prose ===
- Kerala Charithrathinte Adisthana Reghakal (Historical records of Kerala) (2007)
- Ee Mannil Evarodoppam (Memoirs) (2011)
- Theranjedutha Prabhandangal (Selected Essays) (2012)
- Thilacha Mannil Kalnadayayi (Autobiography) (2017)

=== Translations ===
- Media (Greek Tragedy by Euripides) (1965)
- African Kavithakal (33 poems from 13 African Countries) (1989)
- Charamageetham (Anna Akhmatova's poems in Russian) (1989)
- Kulashekhara Alwarude Perumal Tirumozhi (Early Tamil Poem) (2001)
- Puthusseriyude Vivarthanangal (2008)
- Russian African Kavithakal (2012)

=== Critical Editions ===
- Kannassa Ramayanam (Balakandam) (1967)
- Kannassa Ramayanam (Yudhakandam) (Published for the first time based on a manuscript of AD 1519) (1971)
- Pracheena Malayalam (Collection Inscriptions) (1978)
- Kannassa Ramayanam (Sundarakandam) (1980)
- Kannassa Ramayanam (Kishkindakandam) (1984)
- Kerala Panineeya Vimarsam (Collection of critical essays with introduction) (1986)
- Kerala Panineeyam (Reprint of the first edition of Malayalam grammar with critical introduction) (1989)
- Bhasha Bhagavath Gita (Complete text with critical edition and commentary) (2002)
- Kannassa Ramayanam (Complete text with critical edition and commentary) (2013)

=== Festschrift on Dr. Puthusseri Ramachandran ===
- Kavitha Kaalathinte Sakshi (1998)
- Studies in Dravidian Place Names (1993)

=== Works in English ===
- Language of Middle Malayalam (1972)
- Perspectives in Place Name Studies (Editor) (1987)
- Studies in Dravidian Place Names (Editor) (1989)
- Ellis on Malayalam Language (2003)

=== Works Translated ===
- Puthusseri ki Kavitha (Hindi) (2001)

His poems were translated into Hindi, English and Tamil published in various journals.

== Awards ==
- Bhasha Samman, Sahitya Akademi (2014)
- Sahitya Akademi Translation Prize, Sahitya Akademi (2004)
- Fellowship, Kerala Sahitya Akademi (2009)
- Kerala Sahitya Akademi Award for Overall Contributions (1999)
- Abu Dhabi Sakthi Award (Poetry) (2005)
- Abu Dhabi Sakthi Award (Other category literature) (2018) - Thilacha Mannil Kalnadayayi
- N. V. Krishna Warrier Vignjaana Puraskaram (2008)
- Mahakavi Vallathol Award (2008)
- Asan Smaraka Kavitha Puraskaram (Asan Memorial Association, Chennai) (2008)
- Yesenin Award, Russia (2012)
- Ezhuthachan Puraskaram, Kerala (2015)
- Thoppil Bhasi Award (2016)

== Positions held ==
- Founder Member, C. Achutha Menon Foundation (1991)
