= Kottappadi Part, Meppadi =

Kottappadi-Part
- Village
- Country: India
- State: Kerala
- District: Thrissur

Government
  - Body: Guruvayoor municipality

Population (2011)
  - Total: 23,384

Languages
  - Official: Malayalam, English
- Time zone: UTC+5:30 (IST)
- PIN :680505: 673577
- Vehicle registration: KL46-

Kottappadi-Part is a village near guruvayoor in Thrissur district in the state of Kerala, India.

== Demographics ==
As of 2011 India census, Kottappadi had a population of 23384 with 11228 males and 12156 females.

== Transportation ==
Kottappadi Part is 85 km by road from Kozhikode railway station and this road includes nine hairpin bends. The nearest major airport is at Calicut. The road to the east connects to Mysore and Bangalore. Night journey is allowed on this sector as it goes through Bandipur national forest. The nearest railway station is Mysore. There are airports at Bangalore and Calicut.
