= Urulikunnam =

Village in Kottayam District, Kerala, India

Urulikunnam is a small village near Paika Town in the [kanjirapally]] Taluka area of Kottayam District, Kerala, India. It consists of many religious communities. Most of the people are farmers. There is a parish church and temples. Njandupara and Chengalam are the nearest places.Notable people from Urulikunnam include Malayalam writer Zacharia, Padmasree Moozhikkal Pankajakshi and Indian mentalist and hypnotist Dr. Sajeev P. B. Pallathu.
