= Vishnunarayanan Namboothiri =

Indian poet (1939–2021)

- Born: 2 June 1939; Thiruvalla, Kerala, India
- Died: 25 February 2021 (aged 81); Thiruvananthapuram, Kerala, India
- Occupations: Writer, poet, academic, priest
- Spouse: Savithri
- Children: 2
- Relatives: Vishnu Namboothiri (father); Adhithi Antharjanam (mother)
- Writing career
- Language: Malayalam
- Notable works: Swathanthrathe Kurichu Oru Geetham; Bhoomigeethangal; Indiayenna Vikaaram; Charulata
- Notable awards: 2014 Padma Shri; 2014 Ezhuthachan Puraskaram; 2004 Kerala Sahitya Akademi Award for Overall Contributions; 1994 Sahitya Akademi Award

Vishnunarayanan Namboothiri (2 June 1939 – 25 February 2021) was an Indian writer and scholar of Malayalam literature. Known primarily for his poems, Namboothiri also contributed to other genres such as essays, translations and children's literature. Swathanthrathe Kurichu Oru Geetham, Bhoomigeethangal, Indiayenna Vikaaram and Charulata count among his notable works. The Government of India honored him with the fourth highest civilian award of the Padma Shri in 2014 and the Government of Kerala awarded him the Ezhuthachan Puraskaram, the highest literary award in Malayalam, the same year. He was also a recipient of Vayalar Award, Vallathol Award, Kerala Sahitya Akademi Award for Overall Contributions, Asan Prize, Sahitya Akademi Award and Odakkuzhal Award.

== Biography ==
Vishnunarayanan Namboothiri was born on 2 June 1939, to Vishnu Namboothiri and Adhithi Antharjanam at Seeravally Illam in Thiruvalla, Kerala. After traditional education of Vedas, Puranas and Sanskrit from his grandfather, he did his school education at Prince Marthanda Varma High School, Peringara and subsequently, obtained his graduate degree from St. Berchmans College, Changanacherry and his master's degree from St. Joseph's College, Devagiri, topping the examination. He started his career as a teacher of Mathematics at his alma mater, Peringara School, but moved to Malabar Christian College as a faculty in English department. Later, he worked in various parts of the state such as Kozhikode, Kollam, Pattambi, Ernakulam, Tripunithura, Chittur, Thalassery (Government Brennen College) and the State Institute of Languages, before superannuating from service as the head of the department of English at the University College Thiruvananthapuram. Later, he also worked as the high priest at Sreevallabha Temple, his ancestral temple.

Vishnunarayanan Namboothiri was married to Savithri Antharjanam and the couple had two daughters, Adhithi and Aparna.

== Death ==
He died on 25 February 2021, aged 81, at his home in Thycaud near Thiruvananthapuram due to age-related illnesses. He was cremated with full state honours at Santhikavadam Crematorium near his home.

== Temple controversy ==
During his tenure as the high priest of Sreevallabha Temple, an official of the temple raised an issue in 1997 regarding his travel to London for presenting a paper on Vedas, which the official claimed that crossing the seas was an unacceptable practice for a priest. He was asked to abstain from performing his duties as the priest. However, the controversy subsided after public resistance and Namboothiri resumed his priestly duties.

== Awards ==
Vishnunarayanan Namboothiri, whose poems are known to be a blend of tradition with modernity, received the Kerala Sahitya Akademi Award for Poetry in 1979 for his poetry anthology, Bhumigeethangal. Fifteen years later, Sahitya Akademi selected his anthology, Ujjayiniyile Rappakalukal for the 1994 Sahitya Akademi Award. In between, he received the Odakkuzhal Award for his work, Mukhamevide?. He received the Asan Smaraka Kavitha Puraskaram in 1996, and Kerala Sahitya Akademi honored him again in 2004 with their Award for Overall Contributions. He received the Mathrubhumi Literary Award in 2009 and the year 2010 brought him two awards, *Vayalar Award for Chaarulata and the Vallathol Award. The Government of India honored him in 2014 with Padma Shri, the fourth highest civilian award in India, and the same year, The Government of Kerala awarded him their highest literary award of the Ezhuthachan Puraskaram. The other awards received by him include Changampuzha Award, Ulloor Award, Pandalam Keralavarma Poetry Award, Deviprasadam Trust Award (2005), Ettumanoor Somadasan Sahitya Puraskaram and C. V. Kunhiraman Literary Prize.

== Bibliography ==
=== Poetry ===
- Namboothiri, Vishnunarayanan. Vaishnavam. Mathrubhumi Books. ISBN 9788182654662.
- Vishnunarayanan Nambudiri (1968). Swaathandhryathe-Kurich Oru Geetham (in Malayalam). Kōṭṭayaṃ: SPCS. OCLC 31893744.
- Namboothiri, Vishnunarayanan (1985). Aparājita: theraññeṭutta kavitakaḷ (in Malayalam). Kōṭṭayaṃ: Little Prince Publications. OCLC 17123469.
- Vishnunarayanan Nambudiri (1987). Āraṇyakaṃ. Kozhikode: Mathrubhumi Books. OCLC 24213789.
- Namboothiri, Vishnunarayanan (2010). India Enna Vikaram. National Book Stall.
- Namboothiri, Vishnunarayanan. Ujjayiniyile Raapakalukal (in Malayalam). Mathrubhumi Books. p. 88. ISBN 8182643902.
- Viṣṇunārāyaṇan Nampūtiri (1978). Bhoomigeethangal (in Malayalam). India: Viṣṇunārāyaṇannampūtiri : Kōṭṭayaṃ : Vitaraṇaṃ, Nāṣanal Bukkst̲āḷ. OCLC 1121464462.
- Namboothiri, Vishnunarayanan. Mukhamevide.
- Vishnunarayanan Nambudiri (1986). Athirthiyilekkoru Yaathra. Kōṭṭayaṃ: DC Books. OCLC 18260284.
- Namboothiri, Vishnunarayanan (2012). Parikramam. National Book Stall.
- Namboothiri, Vishnunarayanan. Sreevalli.
- Viṣṇunārāyaṇan Nampūtiri (2006). Uttarayanam. Title on p. Facing t.p.:Utharaayanam. Kozhikode: Poorna Publications. ISBN 9788130003795. OCLC 679299312.
- Namboothiri, Vishnunarayanan. Ente Kavitha (in Malayalam). Mathrubhumi Books. p. 208. ISBN 9788182645646.
- Namboothiri, Vishnunarayanan (2013). Pranayageethangal. SPCS. ISBN 9780000194237.
- Namboothiri, Vishnunarayanan. Kayyoppu Maram.
- Namboothiri, Vishnunarayanan (2012). Charulatha. National Book Stall.
- Namboothiri, Vishnunarayanan (2015). Jayaprakasham. Mathrubhumi Books.

=== Essays ===
- Viṣṇunārāyaṇan Nampūtiri (1981). Asaahitheeyam (in Malayalam). Irinjalakuda: Samsārā Publications. OCLC 1119071712.
- Vishnunarayanan Nambudiri (1985). Kavithayude DNA (in Malayalam). Kottayam, India: Little Prince Publications. OCLC 21079328.
- Vishnunarayanan Nambudiri. Alakadalum Neyyampalulkalum (in Malayalam).
- Namboothiri, Vishnunarayanan (2017). Sreevallabho Rakshathu. Mathrubhumi Books. ISBN 9788182671546.

=== Travelogues ===
- Namboothiri, Vishnunarayanan (2014). Yaathrayaatham (First ed.). Kozhikode, Keralam, India. ISBN 978-81-8266-114-1. OCLC 964438066.

=== Translations ===
- Bhasan (2007). Karnabhaaram. Translated by Namboothiri, Vishnunarayanan. Kerala Sahitya Akademi. ISBN 978-8176901284.
- Rithu Samhaaram
- Gandhi
- Bold, Harold C; Nārāyaṇan Nampūtiri, Viṣṇu (1974). Sasyalōkam. Translated by Namboothiri, Vishnunarayanan. Thiruvananthapuram: Kerala Bhasha Institute. OCLC 1065261213.
- Kuttikalude Shakespeare

== See also ==
- Malayalam literature
- List of Indian poets
