= Sukumar Azhikode =

Indian academic and critic (1926–2012)

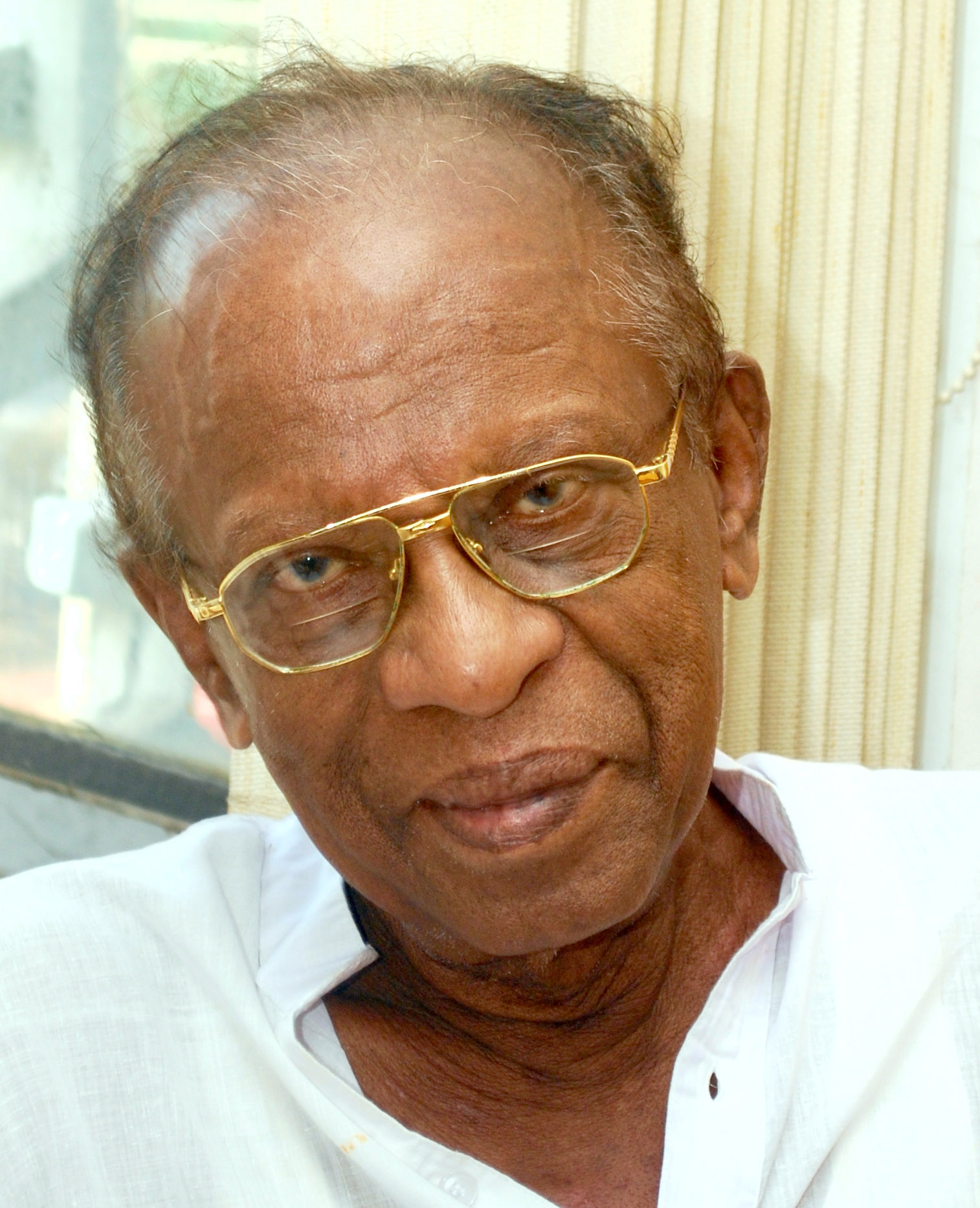
- Azhikode in 2011
- Born: Koloth Thattarath Sukumaran; 12 May 1926; Azhikode, Kannur, Kerala, India
- Died: 24 January 2012 (aged 85); Thrissur, Kerala, India
- Occupations: Writer; social critic; orator; academic
- Relatives: Vidvan Panankavil Dhamodharan (father); Koloth Thattarath Madaviyamma (mother)
- Writing career
- Notable works: Tatvamasi; Aasante Seetakavyam; Ramananum Malayalakavitayum; Mahatmavinte Margam; Malayala Sahityavimarsanam
- Notable awards: 1984 Kerala Sahitya Akademi Award for Literary Criticism; 1985 Kerala Sahitya Akademi Award for Miscellaneous Works; 1985 Sahitya Akademi Award; 1989 Vayalar Award; 2004 Ezhuthachan Puraskaram; 2007 Vallathol Award; 2007 Padma Shri (refused)

Koloth Thattarath Sukumaran, popularly known as Sukumar Azhikode (26 May 1926 – 24 January 2012) was an Indian academic, orator, critic and writer of Malayalam literature, known for his contributions to Malayalam language and insights on Indian philosophy. He was a scholar in Sanskrit, Malayalam, and English languages and his work, Tatvamasi, published in 1984, is a notable for its detailed interpretation of Indian philosophy, Vedas and Upanishads. He was a recipient of several honours including Sahitya Akademi Award, Kerala Sahithya Akademi Award, Vayalar Award, Vallathol Award and Ezhuthachan Puraskaram, the highest literary award of the Government of Kerala. The Government of India awarded him the fourth highest civilian honour of the Padma Shri in 2007, which he refused citing the award was a discrimination.

== Biography ==
Sukumar Azhikode was born on 12 May 1926, at Azhikode, a coastal village in the Kannur district of the south Indian state of Kerala, to Vidwan Panankavil Damodharan, a teacher, and his wife, Koloth Thattarathu Madhaviyamma, as the fourth of their six children. His early schooling was at Azhikode South Elementary School, and he passed the intermediate examination from Rajas High School Chirakkal in 1941 before studying ayurveda at Kottakkal Arya Vaidya Patasala for one year. Subsequently, he joined St. Aloysius College, Mangalore, from where he graduated in commerce in 1943.

Azhikode started his career as a clerk at the Kannur branch of Indian Overseas Bank but soon quit the job to pursue a teaching career for which he completed the teachers' training course from Government College of Teacher Education, Kozhikode (GCTE) and joined his alma mater, Rajas High School, Chirakkal, as a teacher in 1948. While serving as a teacher, he continued his studies through distance education and earned master's degrees in Sanskrit and Malayalam languages. He followed it up with a bachelor's degree in education from GCTE in 1952. During the next three and a half decades, he worked at various institutions, starting with St. Joseph's College, Devagiri, and St. Aloysius College, Mangalore, as a lecturer, as the principal at SNM Training College, Moothakunnam, before joining the University of Calicut as the founder head and professor of the department of Malayalam. In between, he secured a PhD in Malayalam literature in 1981 for his thesis, Western Influence in Malayalam Literary Criticism. Later, he served as the pro vice chancellor and acting vice chancellor of the university.

Azhikode lived a bachelor throughout his life; his relationship with Vilasini teacher, to whom he had proposed, did not result in a marriage. He lived in Eravimangalam, Thrissur, towards the later part of his life and died on 24 January 2012, at Amala Institute of Medical Sciences, Thrissur. He was 85 years old and was suffering from bone cancer for which he had been hospitalized since 7 December 2011.

Azhikode had an accident in the early 2000s when he was returning to his Thrissur home after a speech. He had caught an auto from Thrissur railway station but had an accident resulting in a wound to the head. Since this happened in the early hours of the morning, the auto driver drove him to some of the private hospitals in Thrissur. Unfortunately, since this was an accident case and Azhikode had blood over his white kurta, he was refused treatment. The staff that refused him treatment did not realize his identity in the early morning hours. After a few failed attempts, Azhikode himself requested the auto driver to drive him to his friend's house at Punkunnam. This friend was Dr. T.I. Radhakrishnan, a renowned physician and neurologist. This is the same doctor who had looked after some of the other literary and cultural giants such as Vailopilli, G Kumarapillai, MK Menon Vilasini, and Krishnankutty Poduval of Kathakali, etc. Azhikode was provided with all necessary care, including Dr. Nalini Radhakrishnan suturing his forehead wound. Azhikode stayed at his friend Dr. Radhakrishnan's clinic for a few weeks before going home. They remained very close friends until his death.

== Literary career ==
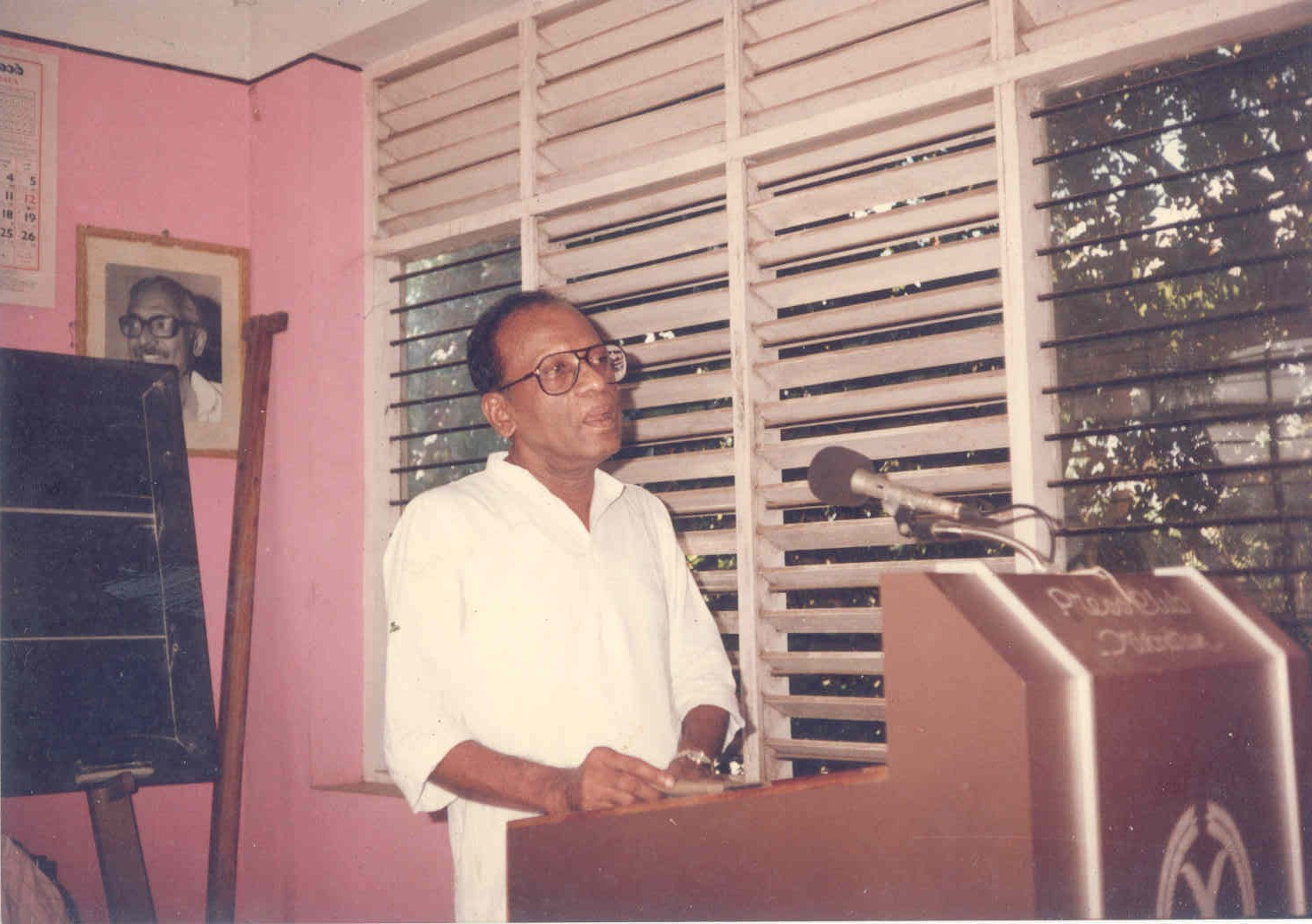
a public speech

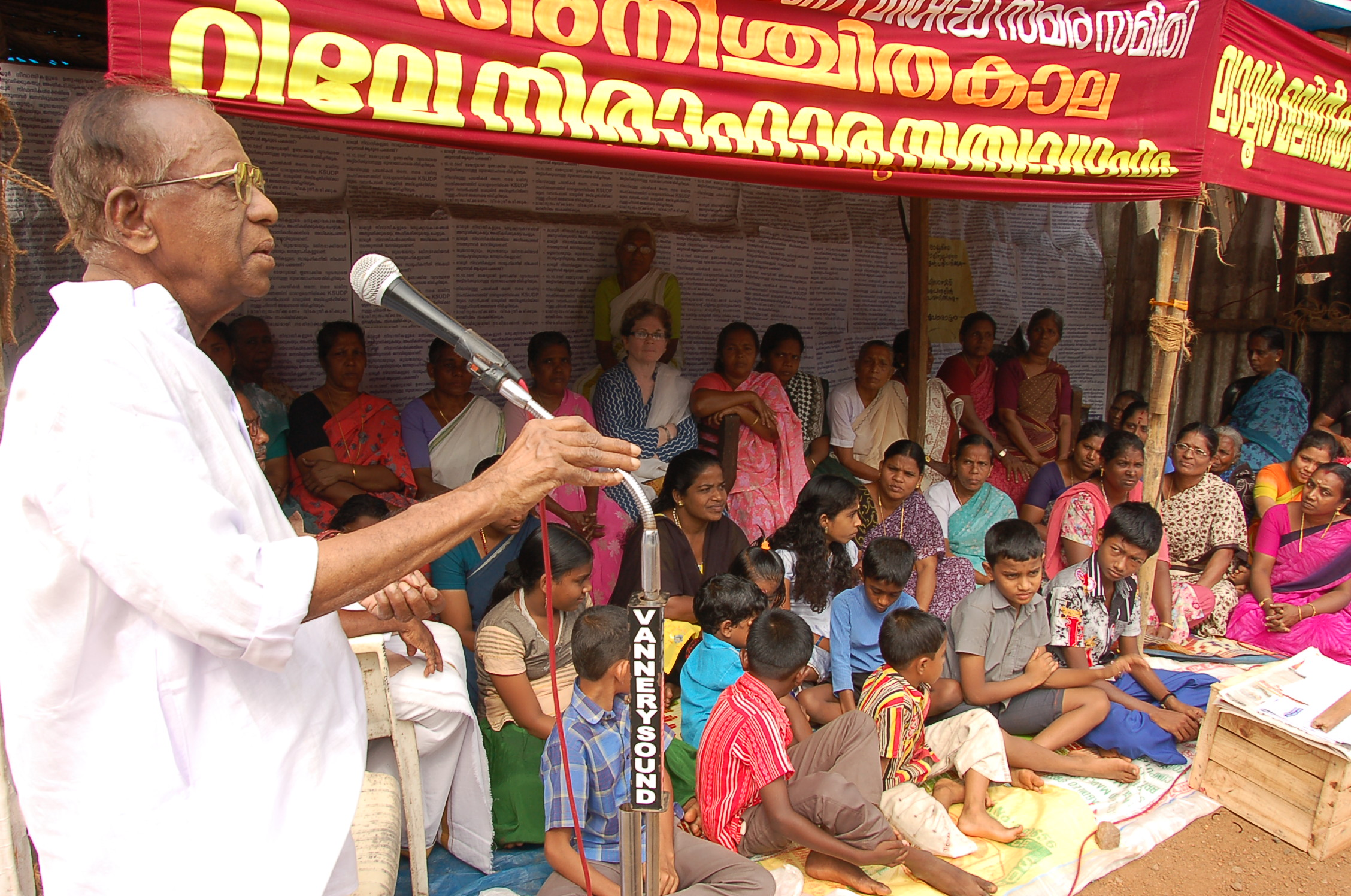
Sukumar Azhikode Speaks in Laloor.

Sukumar Azhikode, considered by many as the leading Malayalam literary critic after the era of Joseph Mundassery, M. P. Paul and Kuttikrishna Marar and one of the greatest Malayalam orators, wrote a number of books on literary criticism, philosophy and social issues, including Thatvamasi, a treatise on Indian philosophy, Vedas and Upanishads which received 12 awards; the book also paved way for another book, Thathwamasi Prabhashanangal, a compilation of four speeches made by Azhikode on the book. Six of his books are on Malayalam literature; Malayala Sahityavimarsanam (Criticism of Malayalam Literature) and Malayala Sahitya Patanangal (Studies on Malayalam Literature) are general studies, two others, Shankarakkuruppu Vimarshikkappedunnu (Sankara Kurup Critiqued) and Mahakavi Ulloor (The Great Poet Ulloor) are studies of the works of G. Sankara Kurup and Ulloor S. Parameswara Iyer while the remaining two, Aasaante Seethaakaavyam (Asan's Seetha Kavyam) and Ramananum Malayalakavitayum (Ramanan and Malayalam Poetry) are critical analysis of two classic poems, Chinthavishtayaya Seetha of Kumaran Asan and Ramanan of Changampuzha Krishna Pillai. Besides several studies on various topics, he also published a book compiling some of his orations under the title, Azhikodinte Prabhashanangal(Orations of Azhikode) and Azhikodinte Phalithangal (Jokes of Azhikode) which narrates his jokes and their situations. He also translated Mark Twain's The Adventures of Huckleberry Finn into Malayalam under the title, Huckleberry Finninte Vikramangal.

== Social activism and controversies ==
Sukumar Azhikode was an active commentator on the changes in the society and his speeches on the demolition of the Babri Masjid were reported to have been notable; his speeches regularly featured comments on historical figures such as Buddha, Jesus Christ, Muhammad, Gandhiji and Ram Manohar Lohia. He was also vocal on contemporaries including V. S. Achuthanandan, G. Sankara Kurup and K. Karunakaran, among others. His war of words with Mohanlal, the Malayalam film actor, drew public interest, and led to Azhikode serving a legal notice on the actor. He was also involved in public exchanges of differences with Vellapally Natesan, the general secretary of Sree Narayana Trust and Innocent, the film actor and contested an election to the Lok Sabha, unsuccessfully, the only time he was involved in active politics.

== Awards and honours ==
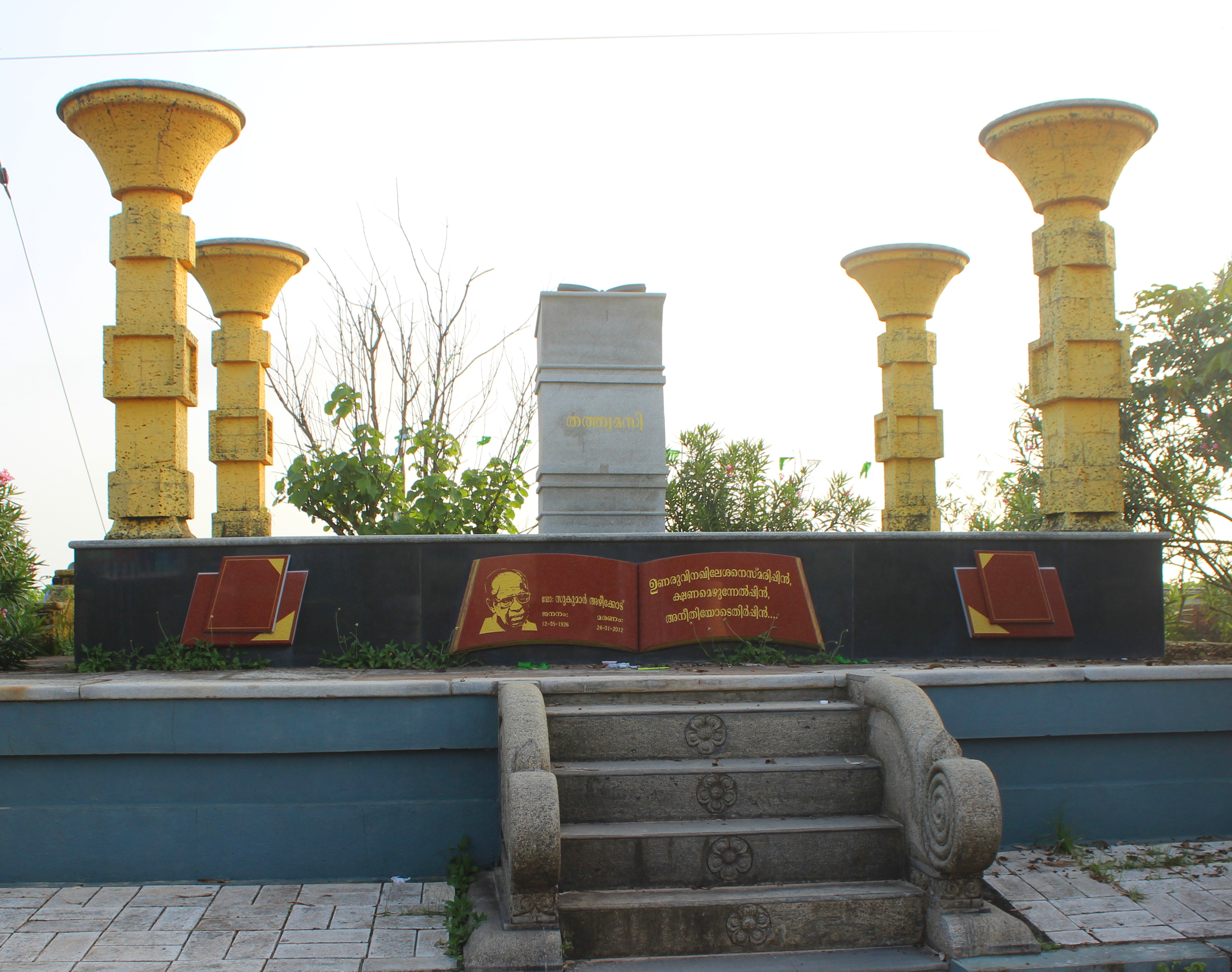
Sukumar Azhikode memorial at Payyambalam Beach, Kannur

Sukumar Azhikode received the Kerala Sahitya Akademi Award for literary criticism in 1984 for his work, Malayala Sahitya Vimarshanam; a year later, Akademi honoured him again with their award for miscellaneous works; Thatvamasi earning him the award. Thatvamasi received another honour the next year in the form of 1985 Sahitya Akademi Award, followed by yet another award, Vayalar Award in 1989. He was the recipient of the 1997 DALA Award of the Dubai Art Lovers Association. The Government of Kerala awarded him for their highest literary honour, the Ezhuthachan Puraskaram, in 2004 and the Government of India selected him for the fourth highest civilian award of the Padma Shri in 2007. However, Azhikode refused the award, citing that the gradation of civilian honours was a form of discrimination. He was also a recipient of the Vallathol Award which he received in 2007 and the Rajaji Award. The Government of Kerala acquired the property of Sukumar Azhikode in 2013 and set up a memorial for him. The memorial holds a museum where his books and personal belongings are on display. Another memorial for the writer has been set up at Payyambalam Beach by Sukumar Azhikode Cultural Center and a Kannur-based cultural association has instituted an annual award, Sukumar Azhikode Memorial Award; M. Mukundan, K. Jayakumar and Sreekumaran Thampi are some of the recipients of the award.

== Bibliography ==
- Sukumar Azhikode. Ramananum Malayala Kavithayum. Ahammadkunchu & Brothers: Ahammadkunchu & Brothers.
- Sukumar Azhikode (1984). Thathwamasi. Kottayam: S.P.C.S.
- Sukumar Azhikode (1981). Malayala Sahitya Vimarsanam. Sukapuram: Vallaththol Vidya Peetdam.
- Sukumar Azhikode. Sankara Kuruppu Vimarsikkappedunnu.
- Sukumar Azhikode (1970). Aashaante Seethaakavyam. Kottayam: Sahitya Pravarthaka Sahakarana Sangam.
- Sukumar Azhikode (1986). Viswasahitya Padanangal. Kottayam: DCB.
- Sukumar Azhikode (1986). Khandanavum Mandanavum. Kottayam: DCB.
- Sukumar Azhikode (1986). Thathwavum Manushyanum. Kottayam: DCB.
- Sukumar Azhikode (1980). Purogamana Sahithyavum Mattum. Kozhikode: Poorna Publications.
- Sukumar Azhikode (1968). Mahathmavinte Margam. S.P.C.S.
- Sukumar Azhikode (2007). Bharathiyatha. Kottayam: D.C. Books. ISBN 9788171309931.
- Sukumar Azhikode (2001). Priyappetta Azhicodinu: Letters. Thrissur: Current Books.
- Sukumar Azhikode (2007). Darsanam, Samooham, Vyakthi. Kozhikode: Lipi. ISBN 9788188011476.
- Sukumar Azhikode (2006). Azheekodinte Lekhanangal. Kozhikode: Matrubhoomi. ISBN 9788182642430.
- Sukumar Azhikode (2006). Nattellu Enna Gunam. Kozhikode: Olive Publications.
- Sukumar Azhikode (2002). Guruvinte Dukham. Kozhikode: Lipi.
- Sukumar Azhikode (1996). Akasham Nashtapedunna India. Calicut: P.K. Brothers.
- Sukumar Azhikode (1980). Vayanayude Swargathil.
- Sukumar Azhikode (1997). Pathakal Kazhchakal. Manadavady Phinix: Manadavady Phinix.
- Sukumar, Azhikode (2011). Indian Avasthakal (1st ed.). Kannur: New Books.
- Azhikode, Sukumar (2009). Janalakkazhchakal. Kozhikode: LIPI books. ISBN 9788188013180.
- Sukumar Azhikode (1986). Malayala Sahitya Patanangal. Kottayam: D.C.Books.
- Sukumar Azhikode. Thathwamasi Prabhashanangal. DC Books. ISBN 978-81-264-6168-4.
- Entinu Bharatadare
- Azhikodinte Phalitangal (Jokes of Azhikode)
- Mahakavi Ulloor (The Great Poet Ulloor)

=== Memoirs and personal writings ===
- Sukumar Azheekode; Jayprakash Peringottukurissi (2011). Arangukaliloode. Kottayam: D C Books. ISBN 9788126430086.
- Sukumar Azhikode (1963). Oru Koottam Pazhaya Kathukal. Mathrubhumi: Mathrubhumi.
- Sukumar Azhikode (1995). Azheekodinde Prabashanangal. Thrissur Current: Thrissur Current.
- Sukumar Azhikode (2007). Vaayichu Valarnna Katha. Kozhikode: Lipi. ISBN 9788188801008.
- Sukumar Azhikode (2008). Azheekodinte Lokathil: Dr. Sukumar Azheekodumayulla Abhimukham. Thrissur: Current Books.

=== Translations ===
- Twain, Mark; Sukumar Azhikode (2009). Huckleberry Finninte Vikramangal. Thrissur: Green books. ISBN 9788184231540.

== See also ==
- List of Indian writers
