= Kerala Sahitya Akademi =

Autonomous body to promote the Malayalam language and literature

Academy for Malayalam Literature
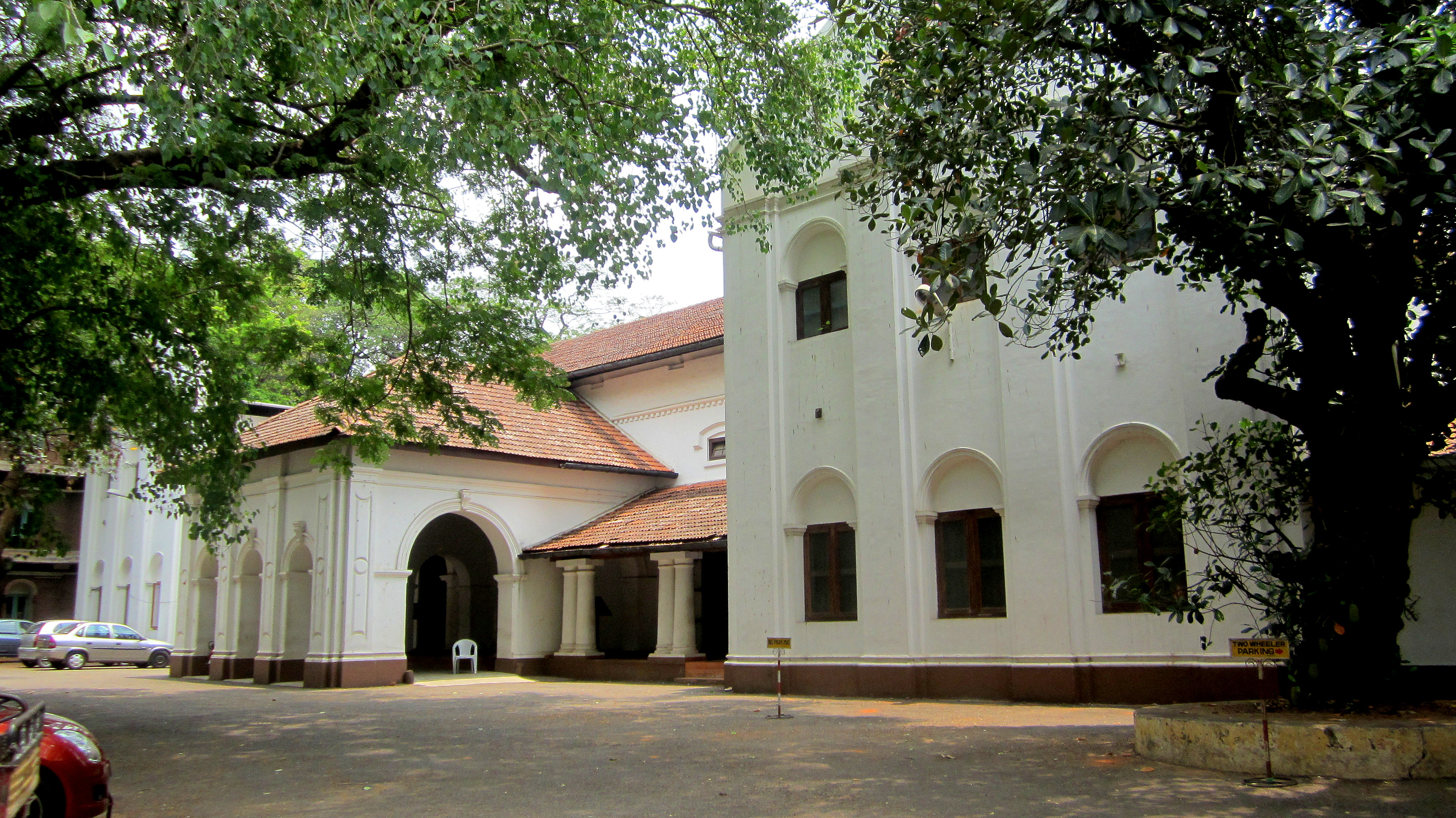
- Formation: 15 October 1956
- Type: Literary Organisation
- Headquarters: Thrissur, Kerala, India
- Official language: Malayalam
- Patron: V. D. Satheesan
- President: Kalpatta Narayanan
- Secretary: C.P. Aboobacker
- Website: keralasahityaakademi.org

The Kerala Sahitya Akademi or Academy for Malayalam Literature is an autonomous body established to promote the Malayalam language and literature. It is situated in the city of Thrissur, Kerala in India.

== History ==
The academy was inaugurated on 15 October 1956, by Chithira Thirunal Balarama Varma, the former king of Travancore, in Thiruvananthapuram. It was shifted to its present location in the city of Thrissur in September 1957. Though the Kerala Government provides the funding and support for the academy, the administration of the academy is autonomous according to its constitution. The academy recognises outstanding literary works through its annual literary awards for poetry, novel, story, drama, literary criticism, biography – autobiography, travelogue, humour, translation, children's literature, etc.. As of 2016, Malayalam short story writer Vaisakhan is the academy's president, Khadija Mumtaz its vice president, and K P Mohanan its secretary.

== Kerala Sahitya Akademi Award ==
The Akademi instituted the Kerala Sahitya Akademi Award in 1958. It is given annually to Malayalam writers for their outstanding books of literary merit. The awards are given in various categories.

== Activities ==
The academy has a library in Kerala. It is an approved doctoral research centre for the universities in Kerala. The Akademi also holds periodic book festivals to encourage reading among the masses. The Akademi has a picture gallery of writers of yester years. The Akademi regularly publishes three journals Sahithyalokam, Sahithya Chakravalam and Malayalam Literary Survey (in English). Besides the Kerala Sahitya Akademi Award, the Akademi awards the illustrious Ezhuthachan Puraskaram, which is named after the father of Malayalam literature Thunchaththu Ezhuthachan, yearly to prominent literary figures.

== See also ==
- Sahitya Akademi
- Kerala Sangeetha Nataka Akademi
- Kerala Lalithakala Akademi
