= Abu Dhabi Sakthi Award =

Literary award for Malayalam writers

Abu Dhabi Sakthi Award is a literary award instituted by UAE-based Abu Dhabi Sakthi Theatres and awarded to writers in Malayalam literature. Instituted in 1987, it is given in various categories such as novel, story, poetry, drama, literary criticism, scholarly literature and children's literature. The award for literary criticism is named Sakthi Thayat Award (after writer Thayat Sankaran, given since 1989). The award instituted for overall contribution to Malayalam literature is named T. K. Ramakrishnan Award (after communist politician T. K. Ramakrishnan, given since 2007). The award for other categories of literature is named Sakthi Erumeli Award (after Erumeli Parameswaran Pillai, renamed since 2014).

== List of recipients ==
Year	Award	Awardee	Work	Ref.
1987	Novel	Pangil Bhaskaran	Bhrithyanmar	
1987	Story	Jacob Nayathodu	Kavalkkar	
1987	Poetry	Prabha Varma	Mrithyumjayam	
1987	Drama	K. M. Raghavan Nambiar	Kalakootam	
1988	Novel	C. Radhakrishnan	Munpe Parakkunna Pakshikal	
1988	Story	Sivaraman Cheriyanad	Peruchazhikalude Maalam	
1988	Poetry	Unnikrishnan Kanjirathanam	Agnipanchakam	
1988	Poetry	K. P. Mohammed	Ottakangalkkoru Geetham	
1988	Poetry	Abraham	Villi	
1988	Scholarly literature	M. Kuttikrishnan	Vyloppilli Kavithakal	
1988	Children's literature	Alinthara G. Krishna Pillai	Anachilandikal	
1989	Sakthi Thayat Award	P. Vijayan	—	
1990	Sakthi Thayat Award	S. Sudheesh	—	
1991	Sakthi Thayat Award	Hariharan Poonjar	—	
1992	Sakthi Thayat Award	Dr. S. Rajashekaran	—	
1993	Novel	U. A. Khader	Oru Pidi Vattu	
1993	Story	Asokan Charuvil	Parichitha Gandhangal	
1993	Sakthi Thayat Award	Dr. Azad	—	
1994	Scholarly literature	Dharmaraj Adat	—	
1994	Sakthi Thayat Award	Prof. M. M. Narayanan	—	
1995	Poetry	Lalitha Lenin	Karkidakavavu	
1995	Sakthi Thayat Award	E. P. Rajagopalan	—	
1996	Sakthi Thayat Award	P. K. Pokker	Aadhunikotharathayude Keraleeya Parisaram	
1997	Novel	K. Radhakrishnan	Samanathalam	
1997	Poetry	Iyyamcode Sreedharan	Sangha Ganam	
1997	Children's literature	C. R. Das	Chimbuvum Meetuvum	
1997	Sakthi Thayat Award	Dr. P. Geetha	—	
1998	Sakthi Thayat Award	Prayar Prabhakaran	—	
1999	Novel	Narayan	Kocharethi	
1999	Sakthi Thayat Award	Dr. K. S. Ravikumar	—	
2000	Story	S. V. Venugopan Nair	Veedinte Nanartham	
2000	Sakthi Thayat Award	G. Madhusudhanan	Kathayum Paristhithiyum	
2001	Sakthi Thayat Award	Dr. N. Rajan	—	
2002	Novel	Akbar Kakkattil	Vadakkuninnoru Kudumba Vrithaantham	
2002	Story	K. R. Mallika	—	
2002	Poetry	Desamangalam Ramakrishnan	—	
2002	Drama	Pirappancode Murali	—	
2002	Scholarly literature	Dr. K. G. Paulose	—	
2002	Children's literature	Kureepuzha Sreekumar	—	
2002	Children's literature	K. Sreekumar	Jeemaji	
2002	Sakthi Thayat Award	Dr. P. Soman	—	
2003	Sakthi Thayat Award	Dr. Babu	—	
2003	Sakthi Thayat Award	Dr. Jacob Issac Kalimadom	—	
2004	Sakthi Thayat Award	Dr. M. Leelavathy	—	
2005	Novel	Ambikasuthan Mangad	—	
2005	Story	Sreevaraham Balakrishnan	—	
2005	Poetry	Puthussery Ramachandran	—	
2005	Drama	Suresh Babu Sreestha	—	
2005	Scholarly literature	Perumpuzha Gopalakrishnan	—	
2005	Scholarly literature	N. E. Balakrishnan	—	
2005	Scholarly literature	Kalamandalam Hyderali	—	
2005	Sakthi Thayat Award	Dr. V. Sukumaran	—	
2006	Story	Satheesh Babu Payyannur	Scene Over	
2006	Sakthi Thayat Award	Dr. K. H. Subrahmanyan	—	
2007	T. K. Ramakrishnan Award	Dr. P. K. R. Warrier	Overall contributions	
2007	Novel	S. R. Lal	—	
2007	Story	N. Rajan	—	
2007	Poetry	Amrutha	—	
2007	Poetry	Divakaran Vishnumangalam	—	
2007	Drama	Gireesh Gramika	—	
2007	Scholarly literature	P. Govinda Pillai	—	
2007	Children's literature	Muhamma Ramanan	—	
2007	Other category literature	Karthyayani Kutty Amma	—	
2007	Sakthi Thayat Award	C. R. Prasad	Malayalakavitha Adhunikanantharam	
2008	T. K. Ramakrishnan Award	K. Mohanan	Overall contributions	
2008	Novel	Benyamin	Aadujeevitham	
2008	Sakthi Thayat Award	Dr. K. P. Mohanan	—	
2009	T. K. Ramakrishnan Award	Dr. P. K. Warrier	Overall contributions	
2009	Novel	Simon Britto	Agragami	
2009	Story	Subhash Chandran	Parudeesa Nashtam	
2009	Poetry	Chavara K. S. Pillai	Pachayum Kathiyum	
2009	Drama	Francis T. Mavelikkara	Ayalkoottam	
2009	Scholarly literature	M. P. Veerendra Kumar	Amazonum Kure Vyakulathakalum	
2009	Scholarly literature	C. Bhaskaran	Indian Communist Prasthanam Aadya Padhikar	
2009	Children's literature	M. S. Kumar	Pullinangi	
2009	Sakthi Thayat Award	Sunil P. Ilayidom	—	
2010	T. K. Ramakrishnan Award	K. K. N. Kurup	Overall contributions	
2010	Novel	A. P. Jyothirmayi	—	
2010	Story	K. K. Ramesh	—	
2010	Poetry	Sivadas Purameri	—	
2010	Drama	—	—	
2010	Scholarly literature	Kavumbayi Balakrishnan	—	
2010	Children's literature	K. G. Raghunath	Pirannal Sammanam	
2010	Other category literature	Kilimanoor Chandran	Raja Ravi Varmayude Nizhalil Manjupoya Raja Raja Varma	
2010	Sakthi Thayat Award	P. Appukkuttan	—	
2011	T. K. Ramakrishnan Award	Kanayi Kunhiraman	Overall contributions	
2011	Novel	Vipin	Ormayil Sheshikkunnath	
2011	Story	T. P. Venugopalan	Kettal Changu Pottunna Oronnu	
2011	Poetry	Meloor Vasudevan	Ottukarante Mozhi	
2011	Drama	A. Santha Kumar	Karutha Vidhava	
2011	Scholarly literature	Dr. Arif Ali Kolethekkat	—	
2011	Children's literature	K. Pappootty	Shahinayude School	
2011	Children's literature	B. Sandhya	Attakkilikunnile Athbhudangal	
2011	Other category literature	M. K. Sanu	Overall contributions	
2011	Sakthi Thayat Award	P. S. Radhakrishnan	—	
2012	T. K. Ramakrishnan Award	Payyappilly Balan	Overall contributions	
2012	Novel	R. Unnimadhavan	Sirasi	
2012	Story	Susmesh Chandroth	Barcode	
2012	Poetry	V. G. Thampi	Nagnan	
2012	Drama	M. N. Vinaya Kumar	Mariman Kanni	
2012	Scholarly literature	M. R. Raghava Varier	Jainamatham Keralathil	
2012	Children's literature	Parvathi Devi R.	Pathram Pathram Kuttikale	
2012	Other category literature	Lonappan Nambadan	Sancharikkunna Viswasi	
2012	Sakthi Thayat Award	V. Lissy Mathew	Ival Pookkum Ilanji Marangal	
2013	T. K. Ramakrishnan Award	Prof. M. K. Sanu	Overall contributions	
2013	Novel	E. P. Hamsakutty	—	
2013	Story	C. P. Biju	—	
2013	Poetry	Sheeja Vakkom	—	
2013	Drama	Gopinath Kozhikode	—	
2013	Scholarly literature	Sunil P. Ilayidom	—	
2013	Children's literature	M. S. Kumar	—	
2013	Other category literature	K. Rajagopalan	—	
2013	Sakthi Thayat Award	Dr. Pallipuram Murali	—	
2014	T. K. Ramakrishnan Award	V. Aravindakshan	Overall contributions	
2014	Novel	Satheesh Babu Payyannur	Ulkhananangal	
2014	Story	Asokan Charuvil	Novellakal	
2014	Story	E. P. Sreekumar	Currency	
2014	Poetry	S. Ramesan	Hemanthathile Pakshi	
2014	Poetry	Sarath Chandralal	Sarath Chandralalinte Naalu Kavyangal	
2014	Drama	Rajmohan Neeleswaram	Veyilinte Niram	
2014	Scholarly literature	Shibu Muhammed	Udalukal Padumpol	
2014	Children's literature	M. M. Sacheendran	Nayattu	
2014	Sakthi Erumeli Award	E. M. Radha	EMS: Makalude Ormakal	
2014	Sakthi Thayat Award	M. M. Basheer	Thiricharivukal	
2015	T. K. Ramakrishnan Award	M. V. Vishnu Namboothiri	Overall contributions	
2015	T. K. Ramakrishnan Award	N. V. P. Unithiri	Overall contributions	
2015	Novel	K. P. Ramanunni	Daivathinte Pusthakam	
2015	Story	Arshad Bathery	Meenukalude Akashavum Paravakalude Bhoomiyum	
2015	Poetry	Ezhacherry Ramachandran	Ilathumbile Vajradaaham	
2015	Drama	Prasanth Narayanan	Chayamukhi	
2015	Scholarly literature	Dr. B. Ekbal	Indian Oushadha Mekhala Innale Innu	
2015	Children's literature	C. J. Alex	Vanangaliloode Orarivuyathra	
2015	Special award	Sudha S. Nandan	Niyatha	
2015	Sakthi Erumeli Award	Dr. Chanthavila Murali	AKG: Oru Samagra Jeevacharitram	
2015	Sakthi Thayat Award	P. K. Kanakalatha	K. Saraswathiyamma: Ottaykku Vazhi Nadannaval	
2016	T. K. Ramakrishnan Award	Leelakumari Amma	Campaign against Endosulfan pesticide lobby	
2016	Novel	T. D. Ramakrishnan	Sugandhi Enna Andal Devanayaki	
2016	Story	Ashtamoorthi	Avasanathe Shilpam	
2016	Poetry	C. P. Aboobakkar	Nadikalil Ozhukaathathu	
2016	Drama	Sunil K. Cheriyan	Ee Choottonnu Kathichu Tharvo	
2016	Scholarly literature	Neelan	Cinema Swapnam Jeevitham	
2016	V. P. P. Musthafa	Kalayum Prathyayasasthravum		
2016	Children's literature	Dr. Radhika C. Nair	—	
2016	Sakthi Erumeli Award	K. M. Lenin	A. K. G. Enna Jananayakan	
2016	Sakthi Thayat Award	K. M. Anil	Pantharum Vazhiyambalangalum	
2017	T. K. Ramakrishnan Award	M. Mukundan	Overall contributions	
2017	Novel	P. Krishnanunni	Keralam Oru Documentary	
2017	Story	G. R. Indugopan	Kollappatti Daya	
2017	Poetry	Ahmed Khan	Mathethara Ithihasam	
2017	Poetry	Vinod Vaisakhi	Kaithamel Paccha	
2017	Drama	Subhash Chandran	Onnaramanikoor	
2017	Scholarly literature	Dr. K. N. Ganesh	Malayaliyude Deshakalangal	
2017	Scholarly literature	Dr. V.P.P Mustafa	Kalayum Prathyayasasthravum	
2017	Children's literature	K. Rajendran	RCCyile Albutha Kuttikal	
2017	Sakthi Erumeli Award	Dr. George Varghese	Albert Elnstein Jeevitham Sastram Darshanam	
2017	Sakthi Thayat Award	Dr. P. Soman	Vyloppilli Kavitha Oru Idathupaksha Vayana	
2018	T. K. Ramakrishnan Award	K. N. Panikkar	Overall contributions	
2018	Novel	S. R. Lal	Statue P.O.	
2018	Story	C. S. Chandrika	Ente Pachakkarimbe	
2018	Story	Sreekantan Karikkakom	Palaayanangalile Muthalakal	
2018	Poetry	Anuja Akathoottu	Amma Urangunnilla	
2018	Poetry	Sebastian	Attupokathath	
2018	Drama	Pradeep Mundur	Ottu	
2018	Scholarly literature	Dr. R. Radhakrishnan	Keralathinte Sthree Sakti Charithram	
2018	Scholarly literature	V. D. Selvaraj	Sasthrasamvadam	
2018	Children's literature	Palliyara Sreedharan	Kathayalla Jeevitham Thanne	
2018	Sakthi Erumeli Award	Puthussery Ramachandran	Thilacha Mannil Kalnadayayi	
2018	Sakthi Thayat Award	Dr. K. Sreekumar	Adutha Bell	
2019	T. K. Ramakrishnan Award	T. Padmanabhan	Overall contributions	
2019	Novel	L. Gopikrishnan	Njan Ente Shatru	
2019	Story	John Samuel	Yadhastu	
2019	Poetry	Desamangalam Ramakrishnan	Enne Kandumuttanenikkavumo	
2019	Poetry	E. Sandhya	Ammayullathinal	
2019	Drama	T. Pavithran	Prappidiyan	
2019	Drama	Cheramangalam Chamunni	Jeevithathinte Edukal	
2019	Scholarly literature	Anil Vallathol	Ezhuthachan Enna Padapusthakam	
2019	Children's literature	Kalavoor Ravikumar	Chinese Boy	
2019	Sakthi Erumeli Award	Bhasura Devi	P.K. Kunjachan Bhasura Ormakal	
2019	Sakthi Erumeli Award	Dr. T. Geenakumari	Susheela Gopalan Jeevitha Kadha	
2019	Sakthi Thayat Award	Dr. Santhosh Vallikkad	Puravrithavum Kavithayum	
2019	Sakthi Thayat Award	T. Narayanan	Krithikal Manushyakathanugayikal	
2020	T. K. Ramakrishnan Award	C. L. Jose	Overall contributions	
2020	Novel	K. R. Mallika	Akam	
2020	Story	V. R. Sudheesh	Kadukkachi Manga	
2020	Poetry	Ravunni	Karutha Vatte Karutha Vatte	
2020	Poetry	Azeem Thannimoodu	Marathine Thirichu Vilikkunna Vithu	
2020	Drama	E. T. Davis	Irikkappindam Katha Parayunnu	
2020	Drama	Rajmohan Neeleswaram	Jeevitham Thunnumpol	
2020	Scholarly literature	P. Rajeeve	Bharanaghadana: Charithravum Samskaravum	
2020	Children's literature	Sethu	Appuvum Achuvum	
2020	Sakthi Erumeli Award	M. K. Sanu	Kesari Oru Kaalaghattathinte Srishtaavu	
2020	Sakthi Thayat Award	V. U. Srendran	Akam Thurakkunna Kavithakal	
2020	Sakthi Thayat Award	E. M. Suraja	Kavithayile Kaalavum Kaalpadukalum	
2021	T. K. Ramakrishnan Award	M. R. Raghava Varier	Overall contributions	
2021	Novel	Ravivarma Thampuran	Mudippechu	
2021	Story	C. Anoop	Rachukku	
2021	Story	V. K. Deepa	Women Eaters	
2021	Poetry	Sudheesh Kottembram	Chilanthinrutham	
2021	Poetry	Surab	Maavu Pookkum Kalam	
2021	Drama	M. Rajeev Kumar	M. Rajeev Kumarinte Nadakangal	
2021	Scholarly literature	Kavitha Balakrishnan	Vayana Manushyante Kalacharithram	
2021	Scholarly literature	K. Sudheesh	Nammalengane Nammalayi	
2021	Children's literature	K. Rekha	Nunayathi	
2021	Sakthi Erumeli Award	Dr. B. B. Sreekumar	Kunjunni Arude Thonnalanu	
2021	Sakthi Thayat Award	—	—	
2022	T. K. Ramakrishnan Award	Adoor Gopalakrishnan	Overall contributions	
2022	Novel	Ajayakumar	Nizhalkalangal	
2022	Novel	Manasidevi	Savitrikuttiyude Sancharangal	
2022	Story	P. V. Shajikumar	Sthalam	
2022	Poetry	K. Jayakumar	Pingala Kesini	
2022	Poetry	P. N. Gopikrishnan	Kavitha Mamsabhojiyanu	
2022	Drama	John Fernandes	Vritham Pathinonnu Kolu	
2022	Drama	Emil Madhavi	Kumaru	
2022	Scholarly literature	Dr. B. Ekbal	Mahamarikal: Plague Muthal Covid Vare	
2022	Scholarly literature	B. Sreekumar	Ayyappa Paniker Cholkazhchakalum Chollakazhchakalum	
2022	Children's literature	Viswamangalam Sundaresan	Marxinte Katha Kuttikalkku	
2022	Sakthi Erumeli Award	V. S. Rajesh	Sivanayanam	
2022	Sakthi Erumeli Award	Dr. Sreekala Mullasseri	Sthraina Vrithanthangal	
2022	Sakthi Thayat Award	K. V. Sajay	Theliyunnu Manonabhasenikku	
2022	Sakthi Thayat Award	P. G. Sadanandan	Raman: Padavum Padabhedangalum	
2023	T. K. Ramakrishnan Award	Shaji N. Karun	Overall contributions	
2023	Novel	Janamma Kunjunni	Parayathe Poyathu	
2023	Story	Manju Vaikhari	Bodhi Dhaba	
2023	Poetry	Sreekanth Thamarassery	Kadal Kadanna Kariveppukal	
2023	Drama	Kalidas Puthumana	Nataka Panchakam	
2023	Drama	Gireesh Kalathil	Ochayum Kazhchayum	
2023	Scholarly literature	Meenambalam Santhosh	Vedi - Janakeeya Natakam: Ranganubhavapadanam	
2023	Scholarly literature	Prof V. Karthikeyan Nair	Charithrapadanavum Samoohavum	
2023	Children's literature	Divakaran Vishnumangalam	Vella Balloon	
2023	Children's literature	Dr Ratheesh Kaliyadan	Kuttikkuda Usharanu	
2023	Sakthi Erumeli Award	P. P. Balachandran	A. K. G. yum Shakespearum	
2023	Sakthi Thayat Award	M. K. Harikumar	Aksharajalakam	
2023	Sakthi Thayat Award	Dr R. V. M. Divakaran	Kathu Nilkkunnu Kalam	
2024	T. K. Ramakrishnan Award	A. K. Nambiar	Overall contributions	
2024	Novel	S. Mahadevan Thampi	Mruthewsoothram	
2024	Novel	Ambikasuthan Mangad	Allohalan	
2024	Story	M. Manju	Jalappanthu	
2024	Poetry	M. D. Rajendran	Shravanabelagola	
2024	Drama	Anilkumar Alathuparambu	Mahayanam	
2024	Drama	Rafeeq Mangalassery	Kithaab	
2024	Scholarly literature	M. Jayaraj	Vaikom Sathyagraha Charithram: Mathrubhumi Rekhakal	
2024	Scholarly literature	A. K. Peethambaran	Matham Manavikatha Marxism	
2024	Children's literature	G. Sreekantan	Muthalakettu	
2024	Children's literature	Paipra Radhakrishnan	Salkkathakal	
2024	Sakthi Erumeli Award	K. S. Ravikumar	Kadammanitta Kavithayude Kanalattam	
2024	Sakthi Erumeli Award	K. V. Sudhakaran	Oru Samara Noottand	
2024	Sakthi Thayat Award	T. K. Santhosh kumar	Kavithayude Ragapoornima	
