= Kadammanitta Ramakrishnan =

Indian poet

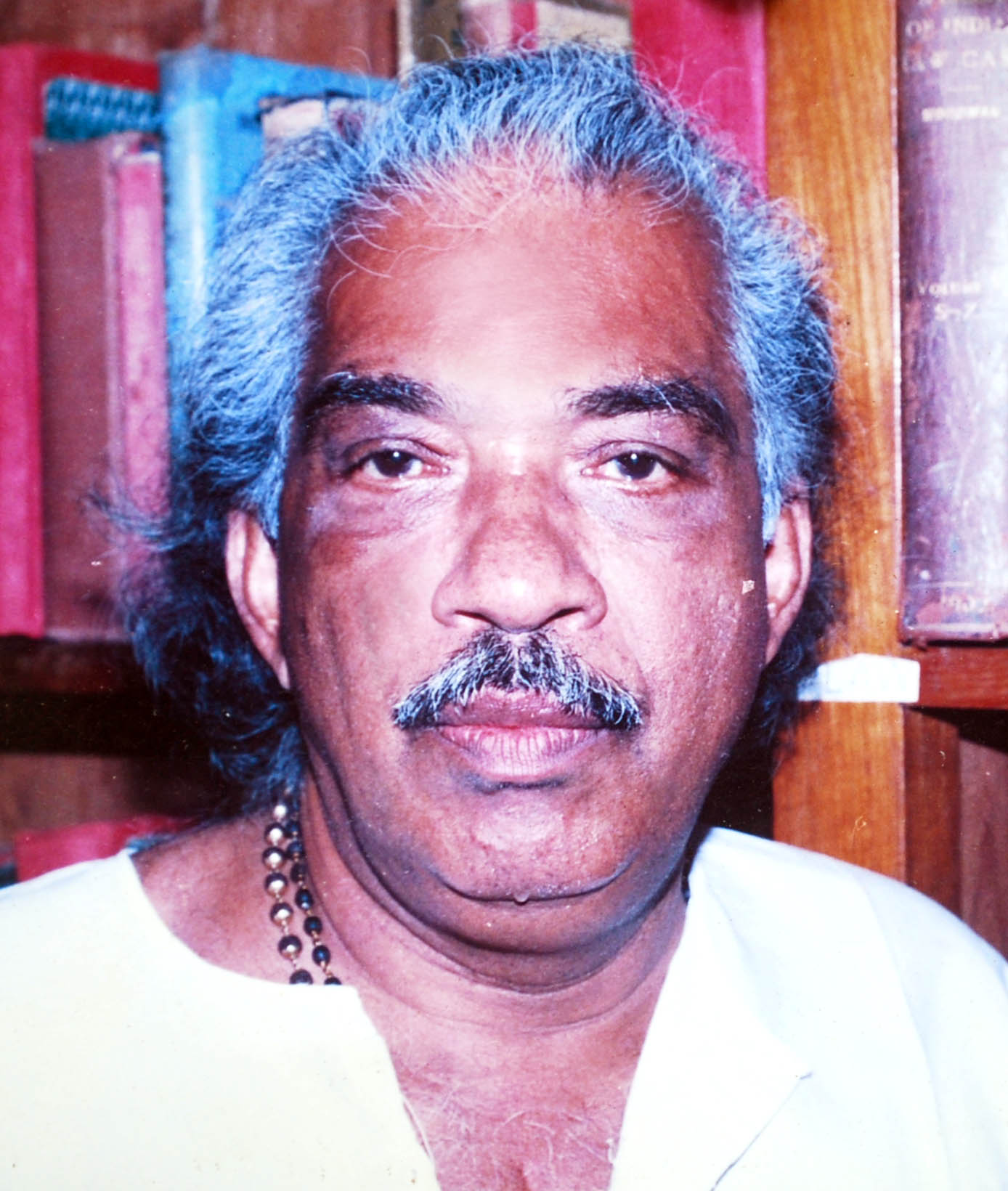

Member of the Kerala Legislative Assembly
- In office 1996 – 2001
- Preceded by: R. Ramachandran Nair
- Succeeded by: Malethu Sarala Devi
- Constituency: Aranmula

President, Purogamana Kala Sahitya Sangham
- In office 2002 – 2008
- Preceded by: N. V. P. Unithiri
- Succeeded by: U. A. Khader

Personal details
- Born: M. R. Ramakrishna Panikkar; 22 March 1935 Kadammanitta, Pathanamthitta, Kerala, India
- Died: 31 March 2008 (aged 73)
- Spouse: Santha
- Occupation: Poet
- Awards: 1982 Kerala Sahitya Akademi Award; 1995 Asan Prize; Al Abu Dhabi Malayalam Samajam Award; New York Malayalam International Foundation Award; Muscat Kerala Samskarika Kendram Award; 2004 Basheer Puraskaram; 2006 Mahakavi Pandalam Keralavarma Poetry Award

M. R. Ramakrishna Panikkar (22 March 1935 – 31 March 2008), popularly known as Kadammanitta Ramakrishnan or Kadammanitta, was an Indian poet. He was born in Kadammanitta province of Pathanamthitta district, Kerala. His childhood experiences, especially the Patayani songs, had a strong influence on his literary work.

== Early life ==
Ramakrishnan was born on 22 March 1935 to Meletharayil Raman Nair and Kuttiyamma. He completed schooling at his home village of Kadammanitta and at the nearby town of Pathanamthitta. He was influenced by the traditional religious art form of Patayani even from his childhood. After his degree studies, he went to Kolkata and then reached Chennai. He was employed with the Postal Audits and Accounts department in 1959. He worked in Thiruvananthapuram from 1967 until his retirement in 1992.

== Literary life ==
Ramakrishnan's poem Njan was published in 1965 in M. Govindan's Sameeksha magazine.

Kadammanitta played a role in reviving interest in poetry by holding thousands of recital sessions in every nook and corner of Kerala in the 1970s and 80s. His work has been widely appreciated for its force, energy, and folk touch, and his work gave a mass appeal and popularity making poetry enjoyable even to commonman. Ramakrishnan's close association with literary and cultural luminaries, which included M. Govindan, Ayyappa Paniker, M. V. Devan, P. K. Balakrishnan, O. N. V. Kurup, Kavalam Narayana Panicker, D.Vinayachandran, and K. V. Thampi, helped him in the endeavour to give a popular image to Malayalam poetry recital. He had recited his fiery works at thousands of venues all over the state, besides editing a poetry journal Kerala Kavitha that attempted to take the essence of poetry from the academic cloisters to the realms of everyday life.

== Other activities ==
A communist, he was involved with the student federation as well as communist party during his college days. In 1992, he became the vice president of CPI-M's cultural wing, Purogamana Kala Sahitya Sangham (Progressive Association for Art and Letters), and in 2002 its president. In 1996, he was elected to Kerala state legislative assembly from Aranmula constituency in Pathanamthitta district. He was still continuing as the President of Purogamana Kala Sahithya Sangham when he died.

== Death ==
Ramakrishnan died at 9 o'clock in the morning of 31 March 2008 at M.G.M. Memorial Medical Centre in Pathanamthitta, nine days after celebrating his 73rd birthday. He had been undergoing treatment for myeloid leukaemia for the past three months. He was survived by his wife, Santha, daughter, Geetha Devi, and son, Geetha Krishnan. He was cremated with full state honours at the premises of his home in his birth village.

== Major works ==
- Kurathi
- Kadinjool Pottan
- Misrathalam
- Mazha Peyyunnu Maddhalam Kottunnu
- Kadammanittayude Kavithakal
- Vellivelicham
- Sooryasila
- Shantha
- Kuppayilundoru Maanikyam
- Ee Poochayaanente Dukham
- Kunje Mulappaal Kudikkaruth

== Awards ==
- Kerala Sahithya Akademi Award 1982 (Kadammanittayude Kavithakal)
- Asan Prize 1995 (Kadammanittayude Kavithakal)
- Abu Dhabi Malayalam Samajam Award
- New York Malayalam International Foundation Award
- Muscat Kerala Samskarika Kendram Award
- Basheer Puraskaram (2004)
- Mahakavi Pandalam Keralavarma Poetry Award(2006)

== See also ==
- Kadammanitta Ramakrishnan Award
- Malayalam literature
- List of Indian poets
