= Sivaraman Cheriyanad =

- ശിവരാമന്‍ ചെറിയനാട്
- Born: 13 December 1941; Cheriyanad, Chengannur, Travancore
- Died: 12 September 2019 (aged 77); Kollakadavu, Cheriyanad
- Writing career
- Language: Malayalam
- Genres: Short story, novel, children's literature, scholarly literature

Sivaraman Cheriyanad was a Malayalam-language writer from Kerala, India. He wrote short stories, novels and children's literature, besides contributing to scholarly literature including studies on the works of Parappurath and Malayattoor Ramakrishnan. He received the Abu Dhabi Sakthi Award and A. P. Kalakkad Award. He was also a school teacher and a recipient of the National Teachers Award.

== Life ==
Sivaraman was born on 13 December 1941 in Cheriyanad near Chengannur in the present-day Alleppey district of Kerala. He started his career as an upper primary school teacher. He was a teacher in Tamil Nadu, Malabar and Alleppey, and retired from Government Girls Higher Secondary School, Mavelikkara. He received the National Teachers Award in 1989. The same year, he received the Abu Dhabi Sakthi Award for the year 1988 for his short story collection Peruchazhikalude Maalam. He received a scholarship from the Kerala Sahitya Akademi in 1990-91 for the study of the works of the writer Parappurath. He received the A. P. Kalakkad Award in 2009. He was the president of Sahithya Pravarthaka Co-operative Society for nine years. He also served as the vice president of A. R. Raja Raja Varma Memorial Committee, office-bearer of Purogamana Kala Sahitya Sangham, and an executive member of the publication wing of Kerala Sahitya Akademi. He died on 12 September 2019 at a private hospital in Kollakadavu near Cheriyanad. His wife Sarasamma had predeceased him.

The Sivaraman Cheriyanad Award, instituted in his memory in 2023, is given annually to the best short story collection in Malayalam. The inaugural award was received by T. P. Venugopalan for his work Thunnalkkaran.

== Works ==
=== Short story collections ===
Year	Title	Publisher
	Peruchazhikalude Maalam	
2000	Puthiya Padangal	Trivandrum: Chintha
1997	Oru Pavam Kazhutha	Trichur: Current Books
1996	Ingane Oro Vidditham	Trichur: Current Books
1992	Asidhara	Alleppey: Janajagruti
1988	Valiyavarude Maranam Valiya Maranam	Kottayam: N.B.S.
1980	Neethipeedathile Kurudan	Kottayam: N.B.S.
1977	Vietnam Kathakal	Kottayam: Vidyarthi Mithram
1977	Kattinte Niram	Trivandrum: Kerala Grandhasala Sangham
2006	Kallan Vasullayude Shashtipoorthi Smaranika: Oru Mukhakurippu	Trivandrum: Chintha
1978	Udaya Geetham	Calicut: Deshabhimani
	Bhranthillatha Bhranthan	
	Daivathinte Kala	
	Thiranjedutha Kathakal	

=== Novels ===
Year	Title	Publisher
1983	Adheham	Kottayam: N.B.S.
1981	Koda	Calicut: Deshabhimani
1979	Tholu	Calicut: Deshabhimani
2005	Bhagavathitheruvile Kattu	Calicut: Haritham Books

=== Children's literature ===
Year	Title	Publisher
1978	Cheppukudathile Chenkadal	Kottayam: Vidyarthi Mithram
1984	Koodu Veedu	Trivandrum: Bala Sahitya Institute
1999	Sundarapuri	Trivandrum: Bala Sahitya Institute
1985	Thenvarikka	Kottayam: S.P.C.S.
1999	Neyyappam	Kottayam: N.B.S.
1981	Anubombinte Pithavu	Trivandrum: Chintha
	Munibalan	
1980	Ammayude Kannuneer	Trivandrum: KANFED

=== Scholarly literature ===
Year	Title	Publisher
1995	Parappurath: Onakattukarayude Kathakaran	Trichur: Kerala Sahitya Akademi
	Malayattoor: Jeevithavum Krithikalum	

== Awards ==
- 1988: Abu Dhabi Sakthi Award – Peruchazhikalude Maalam
- 1989: National Teachers Award
- 2009: A. P. Kalakkad Award
