= S. Ramesan =

Indian writer and orator (1952–2022)

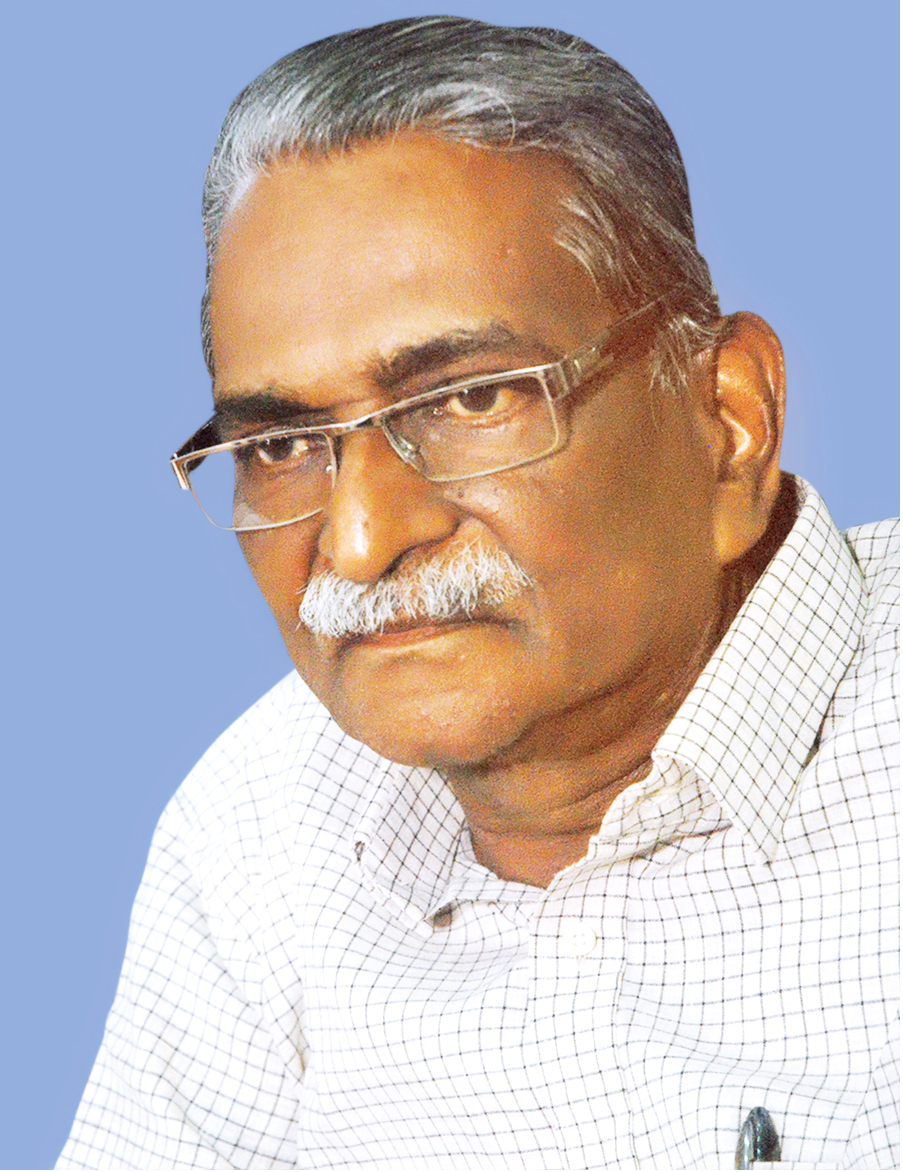
- Born: 16 February 1952; Vaikom, Kottayam district, Travancore–Cochin, India
- Died: 13 January 2022 (aged 69); Pachalam, Ernakulam district, India
- Occupations: Poet, orator
- Spouse: Dr. T. P. Lela
- Children: 2
- Writing career
- Notable awards: Kerala Sahitya Akademi Award, Asan Memorial Poetry Prize

S. Ramesan (16 February 1952 – 13 January 2022) was an Indian Malayalam language poet, orator and literary activist from Kerala.

He received several awards including the Kerala Sahitya Akademi Award and Asan Memorial Poetry Prize.

== Biography ==
S. Ramesan was born in Vaikom in the Kottayam District, on 16 February 1952. He started writing poems during his childhood. He had his primary education at St. Joseph LP School, Palliprathussery and Govt Boys High School, Vaikom. After that he studied at St. Michael's College, Cherthala, Maharaja's College, Ernakulam and Ernakulam Law College. In 1972, he became the first student union chairman of Students' Federation of India at Maharaja's College. Ramesan joined Kerala government service as Block Development Officer (BDO) in 1981 and retired as Additional Development Commissioner in 2007. He previously worked at State Bank of Travancore also.

He was the State Vice President of the Purogamana Kala Sahitya Sangham (Progressive Art Literary Society). He has served as state secretary of Purogamana Kala Sahithya Sangam, Director of the Sahithya Pravarthaka Sahakarana Sangam (Literary Working Co-operative Society), a member of the executive committee of the Kerala State Library Council, a director board member of the Sahithya Pravarthaka Co-operative Society, president of Ernakulam Public Library and editor-in-chief of the Granthalokam Magazine. From 1996 to 2001 he was the Additional Private Secretary in charge of the Kerala state Department of Culture under minister T. K. Ramakrishnan. He was a former member of the CPI (M) Ernakulam Area Committee.

He and his wife T. P. Lela had two daughters. He died at his residence in Pachalam, Ernakulam District on 13 January 2022, just a month before his 70th birthday.

== Works ==
- Shithila chitrangal
- Enikkarodum pakayilla
- Asthishayya
- Kalushithakalam
- Karutha Kurippukal
- S. Ramesante Kavithakal
- Mala Kayarunnavar
- Hemanthathile Pakshi
- Ee Thiruvasthram Njan Upekshikkukayanu
- On The Unquiet Coast
- Karutha Vavvalukal

== Awards and honours ==
- 1999: Cherukad Award (Karutha Kurippukal)
- 2014: Abu Dhabi Sakthi Award - Poetry (Hemanthathile Pakshi)
- 2015: Kerala Sahitya Akademi Award for Poetry (Hemanthathile Pakshi)
- 2019: Asan Memorial Poetry Prize
- A. P. Kalakkad Award
- Mooloor Award
- Fokana Award
