= Sunil P. Ilayidom =

Indian writer and professor (born 1968)

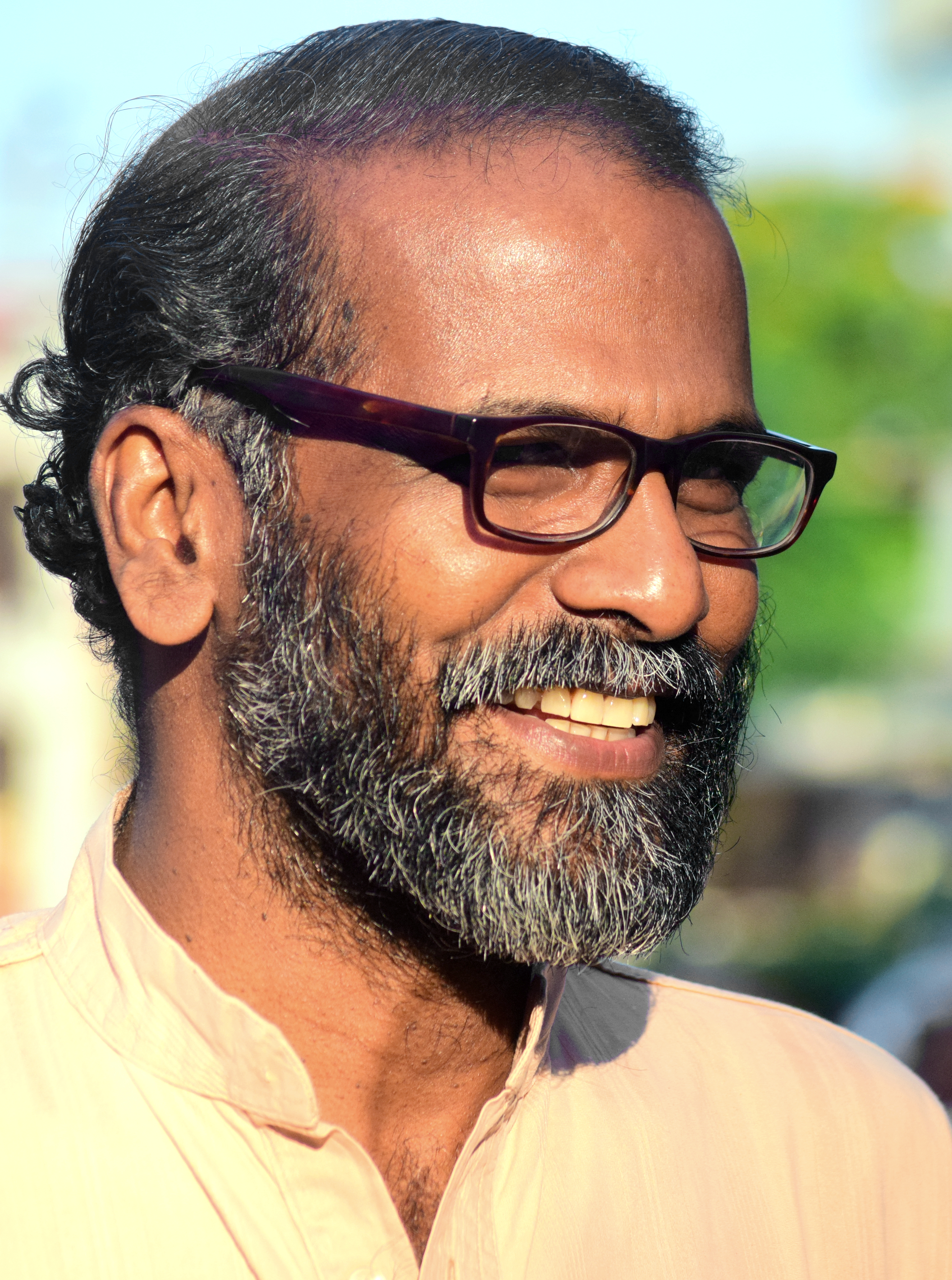
- Born: 1968 (age 57–58); Kottuvally, Ernakulam, Kerala, India
- Citizenship: Indian
- Education: Sree Narayana Mangalam College, Maliankara; Maharaja's College, Ernakulam
- Occupations: Writer; Critic; university professor
- Spouse: Meena Sunil
- Children: 2
- Writing career
- Notable awards: 2016 PuKaSa A. Sudhakaran Cultural Award; 2013 Kerala Sahitya Akademi Award for Literary Criticism; 2011 Kerala Lalithakala Akademi Kesari Award; 2008 Abu Dhabi Sakthi Thayattu Award; 2006 Kerala Sahitya Akademi Award for Scholarly Literature

Sunil P. Ilayidom is an Indian writer, critic, orator and university professor in Malayalam language. He writes and lectures on politics, literature, art and culture. He has received the Kerala Lalithakala Akademi and is a two-time recipient of the Kerala Sahitya Akademi Award.

== Biography ==
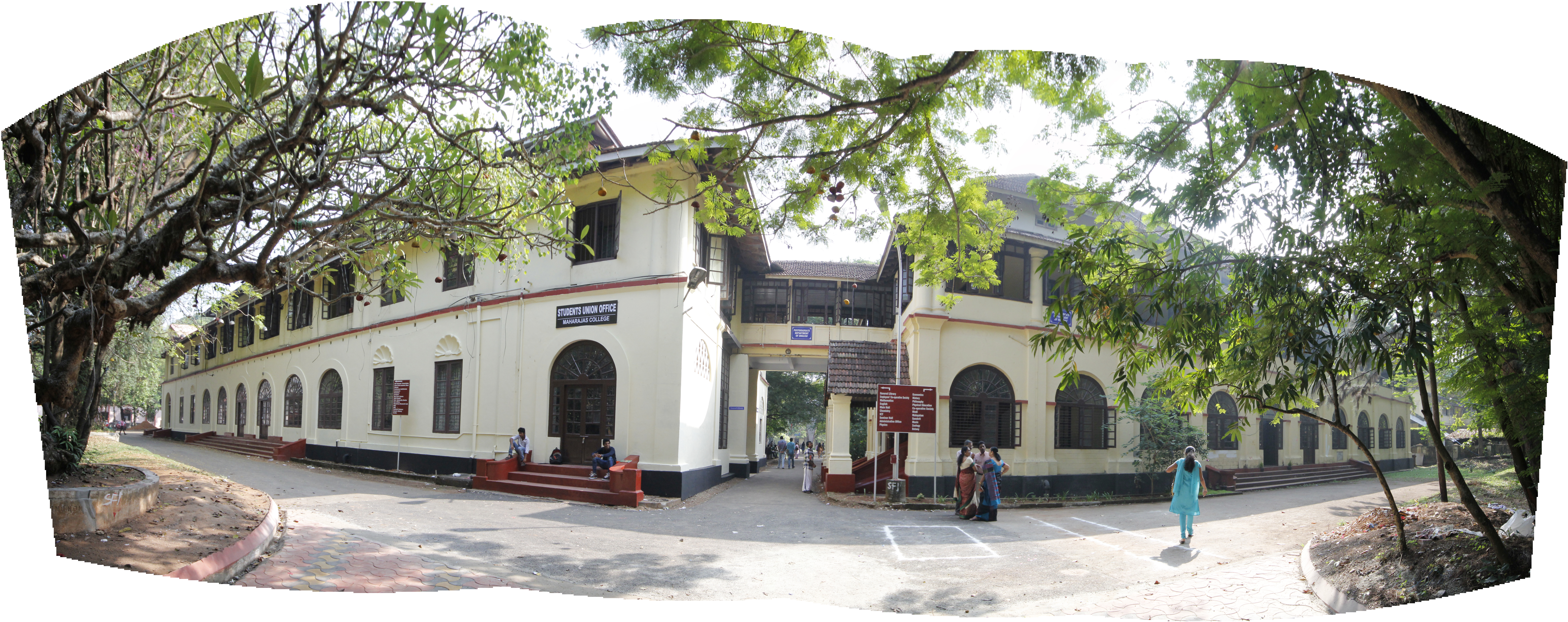
Maharajas College, Ernakulam

Sunil P. Ilayidom, born in 1968 to M. C. Pankajakshan Elayidom and Ramani Devi at Kottuvally, a village in Ernakulam district in the south Indian state of Kerala, did his early schooling at the government upper primary school in his village and at Rama Varma Union High School, in Cherai. Subsequently, he completed his college studies at Sree Narayana Mangalam College, Maliankara and Maharaja's College, Ernakulam and started his career as a teacher at Lakshmi College, Paravur. Later he moved to Desabhimani Daily as a sub-editor and after securing a PhD, joined Sree Sankaracharya University of Sanskrit where he is an associate professor in the department of Malayalam. He has published a number of books on art and literary criticism, history, Marxism and culture and his major works include Kanvazhikal, Kazhchavattangal, Uriyattom, Anubhuthikalude Charithra Jeevitham and Nanarthangal: Samooham, Charithram, Samskaram. He has delivered several lectures which include a five-part lecture series on Cultural history of Mahabharatha.

== Personal life ==
Ilayidom is married to Meena; they have two children Janaky and Madhavan. He and his family live in Kottuvally in Ernakulam district.

== Awards ==
Ilayidom received the Mahakavi Ulloor Memorial Literary Award in 2021 and the Abu Dhabi Sakthi Thayattu Award for literary criticism in 2008. He has received two awards from Kerala Sahitya Akademi, the Kerala Sahitya Akademi Award for Scholarly Literature in 2006 and the Kerala Sahitya Akademi Award for Literary Criticism for his book, Ajnjathavumayulla Abhimukhangal in 2013. In between, he received the Kerala Lalithakala Akademi Kesari Award in 2011. The Purogamana Kala Sahitya Sangham awarded him the A. Sudhakaran Cultural Award in 2016. He is also a recipient of Abu Dhabi Sakthi Award for Scholarly literature (2013), Mullanezhi Sahitya Puraskaram (2019), Chintha Raveendran Memorial Award (2017), M. N. Vijayan Memorial Endowment Award (2016), K. N. Ezhuthachan Smaraka Puraskaram (2014), Pavanan Puraskaram (2010), State Bank of Travancore Award (2009), V. K. Unnikrishnan Award (2005) and Gurudharshana Award (2001).

== Plagiarism allegation ==
Ravisankar S. Nair, an author and Faculty of the Central University of Kerala, alleged in an article written in the November- December (2018) issue of Sahitya Vimarsham, that around 80 percent of the content of one of the chapters in Ilayidom's book titled Anubhoothikalude Charithra Jeevitham was not properly quoted and hence is a copy from Bharathanatyam: A Reader (2012, ed. Davesh Soneji). The allegations were however opposed by a team of 16 scholars who issued a letter in support of Elayidom.

== Selected bibliography ==
#	Title	Title in Malayalam	Year	Reference
1	Kanvazhikal Kazhchavattangal	കൺവഴികൾ, കാഴ്ചവട്ടങ്ങൾ	2003	
2	Uriyattom	ഉരിയാട്ടം	2007	
3	Anubhuthikalude Charithra Jeevitham	അനുഭൂതികളുടെ ചരിത്രജീവിതം	2014	
4	Nanarthangal: Samooham, Charithram, Samskaram	നാനാർത്ഥങ്ങൾ: സമൂഹം, ചരിത്രം, സംസ്കാരം	2016	
5	Vayanavicharaṃ	വായനാവിചാരം	2017	
6	Aparathe Thodumpol	അപരത്തെ തൊടുമ്പോൾ	2018	
7	Alayadikkunna Vakku	അലയടിക്കുന്ന വാക്ക്	2019	
8	Mahabharatham	മഹാഭാരതം	2020	`
