= Kitab =

Kitab (Arabic: کتاب, kitāb), also transcribed as kitaab, is the Arabic word for "script" or "book" and may refer to:

- Kitaab, a 1977 Indian Hindi-language film
- Kithaab (also Kitab), a 2018 Indian Malayalam-language play
- Kitab, the name for Kitob, a city in Uzbekistan

== See also ==
- K-T-B, a Semitic word triconsonantal root
- Khitab, a town in northwestern Syria
- Mushaf or kitāb, a written copy of the Quran
