= M. K. Sanu =

Indian writer (1928–2025)

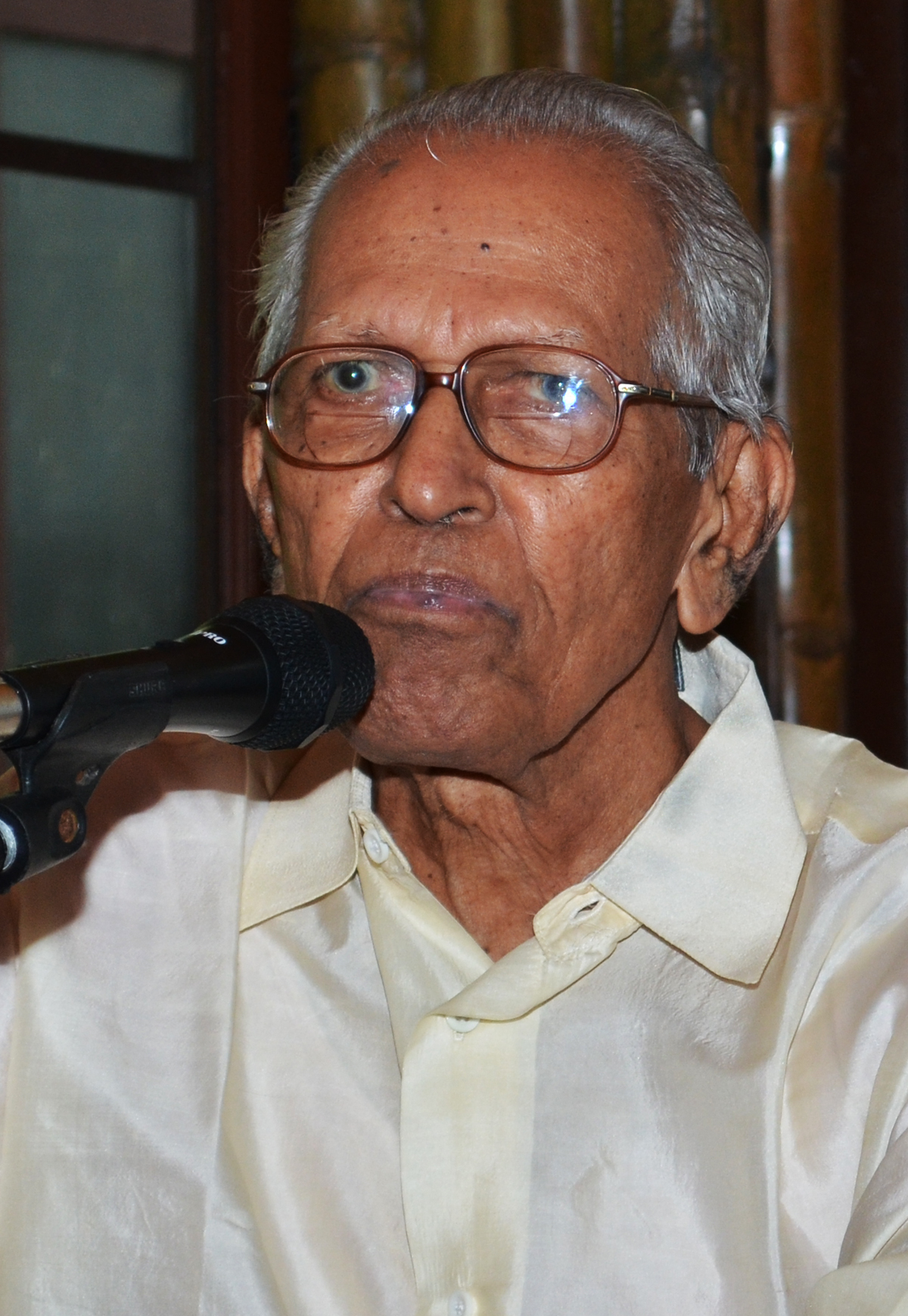
- Born: 27 October 1928; Thumpoly, Kingdom of Travancore, British India (present-day Alappuzha, Kerala, India)
- Died: 2 August 2025 (aged 96); Ernakulam, Kerala, India
- Resting place: Ravipuram Crematorium
- Occupations: Writer; critic; poet; biographer; journalist
- Spouse: Rathnamma
- Writing career
- Language: Malayalam
- Genres: Poetry, essay, biography
- Website: sanumash.com

Mangalath Kesavan Sanu (27 October 1927 – 2 August 2025) was an Indian Malayalam-language writer, critic, academic, biographer, journalist, orator, social activist and human rights activist. He authored at least 36 books.

Sanu was a permanent member of the International Body for Human Rights, as well as the founding member of the Mithram, a school for the mentally handicapped, in Mulanthuruthy, Ernakulam district, Kerala. He was a member of the award selection committee of the Vayalar Ramavarma Literary Award; however, he resigned in September 2019. In 2011, he won the Padmaprabha Literary Award.

== Background ==
Sanu was born on 27 October 1928 in Thumpoly in the erstwhile Kingdom of Travancore, as the son of M. P. Kesavan and K. P. Bhavani. He died from pneumonia at Amrita Hospital in Ernakulam, on 2 August 2025, at the age of 96.

== Career ==
In 1955 and 1956, Sanu joined the Sree Narayana College and Maharaja's College as a lecturer. He retired as a professor in 1983. In 1984, he was elected as the President of Purogamana Kala Sahitya Sangham and the director of Sree Narayana Study Centre, University of Kerala in 1985, followed by an appointment to Sree Narayana Chair, Mahatma Gandhi University, Kottayam in 1997.

In 1987, he was elected as an MLA from Ernakulam Assembly constituency. In 1991, he joined Kumkumam Weekly, Kollam, as the chief editor. He became the elected President of the Vayalar Award Memorial Trust in 2005.

== Recognition ==
- 2011 – Kendra Sahitya Akademi Award for the biography "Basheer: Ekantha Veedhiyile Avadhoothan"
- 2011 – Abu Dhabi Sakthi Award (other category literature) for overall contributions
- 2012 – Pavanan foundation India's Award for 2011 for his Autobiography "Karmagathi"
- 2013 – Ezhuthachan Puraskaram, the highest literary honour given by the Kerala government
- 2013 – Abu Dhabi Sakthi Award for Overall Contribution (T. K. Ramakrishnan Award)
- 2014 – Father Vadakkan Puraskaram
- 2015 – P. Kesavadev Literary Award
- 2020 – Abu Dhabi Sakthi Award (other category literature) (Sakti Erumeli Award) for Kesari Oru Kaalaghattathinte Srishtaavu
- 2021 – Chavara Samskruthy Puraskar by Chavara Cultural Centre
- 2022 – D.Litt. by Mahatma Gandhi University

== Works ==
=== Autobiography ===
- Karmagathi – 2010 - GreenBooks Publication

=== Children's literature ===
Work	Year	Publisher	Place
Sree Narayana Gurudevan	1983	Vivekodayam Printing & Publishing Co.	Irinjalakuda
Sree Narayana Guru	1999	SPCS	Kottayam
Jeevithasanuvil	2007	Balasahitya Prakasham	Edappally

=== Criticism ===
Work	Year	Publisher	Place
Kaattum Velichavum	1960	NBS	Kottayam
Chakravaalam	1962	Sahitya Nilayam Publishing House	Kochi
Manninu Manninte Gunam	1964	Vidyartimitram	Kottayam
Prabhathadarsanam	1970	Poorna Publications	Kozhikode
Chumarile Chitrangal	1971	P.K Brothers	Kozhikode
Rajaveedhi	1971	NBS	Kottayam
Avadhaaranam	1984	DC Books	Kottayam
Anubhoothiyude Nirangal	1986	SPCS	Kottayam
Athirvarampukalillathe	2000	SPCS	Kottayam
Unnathathmakkalude Jeevaraktham	2002	Mathrubhoomi Publishing Co.	Kozhikode
Asaanthiyilninnu Saanthiyilekku	2003	Current Books	Kottayam
Ente Vazhiyampalangal	2004	Green Books	Thrissur
Ezhuthinte Naanarthangal	2005	Green Books	Thrissur
Vimarsanathile Raajasilpi	2005	Maarar Saahitya Prakaasham	Kozhikode
Thuranna Jaalakam	2006	Kavya Books	Mavelikkara
Kaavyathathwa Praveshika	2008	DC Books	Kottayam

=== Interpretations ===
Work	Year	Publisher	Place
Aadhyatma Ramayanam	2004	Mathrubhoomi Publishing Co.	Kozhikode
Sree Maha Bhagavatham	2008	Green Books	Thrissur

=== Travelogues ===
Work	Year	Publisher	Place
Anubhavangal Prathyaasakal	1985	Purogamana Kala Sahitya Sangham	Trivandrum

=== Biographies ===
Work	Year	Publisher	Place
Asthamikkatha Velicham	1962	Poorna Publications	Kozhikode
Narayanaguru Swami	1976	Vivekodayam Printing & Publishing Co.	Iringalakuda
Sahodaran. K. Ayyappan	1980	DC Books	Kottayam
Changampuzha Krishnapilla: Nakshatrangalude Snehabhajanam	1988	SPCS	Kottayam
Sahodaran Ayyappan: Oru Kalaghattathinte Silpi	1989	Sree Narayanaguru Samskara Samiti	Kollam
Mruthyunjayam Kavyajeevitham	1996	S.N Chandrika Educational Trust	Iringalakuda
Parvathy Amma: Asaranarude Amma	2000	Sree Narayana Sevika Samajam	Aluva
M Govindan	2002	DC Books	Kottayam
Yukthivaadi M.C Joseph	2002	Dept. of Cultural Publications, Govt. of Kerala	Trivandrum
Basheer: Ekantha Veedhiyile Avadhoothan	2007	DC Books	Kottayam
K.C Mamman Mappila	2008	Kerala Sahitya Akademi	Thrissur
Manushyathwathinte Margathil	2025	Green Books	Thrissur

=== Memoirs ===
Work	Year	Publisher	Place
Thaazhvarayile Sandhya: Parts I & II	1992	DC Books	Kottayam
Ivar Lokathe Snehichavar	1999	Prabhath Book House	Trivandrum

=== Collected essays ===
Work	Year	Publisher	Place
Sree Narayana Sandhesam	2000	Lalu Books	Kottayam
Ethra Sokamayam Jeevitham	2004	Haritham Books	Kozhikode

=== Translations ===
Work	Year	Publisher	Place
Anchu Sastra Nayakanmar (Five Major Scientists)	1958	Southern Languages Book Trust	Madras
Viswasathilek Veendum (Recovery of Faith)	1959	Southern Languages Book Trust	Madras
American Sahityam	2000	SPCS	Kottayam
Guide	1989	Sahitya Akademi	New Delhi

=== Edited works ===
Work	Year	Publisher	Place
Sahodara Saptati	1960	Sahodaran Ayyappan Saptati Celebration Committee	Ernakulam
Kumaranasante Kavyaprapancham	1974	Navodhana Samiti	Ernakulam
Sahodarante Padyakritikal	1981	DC Books	Kottayam
Sree Narayana Sameeksha	1987	Sree Narayana Study Centre, University of Kerala	Trivandrum
Kusumathinte Kritikal	1989	DC Books	Kottayam
Basheer: Varthamanthinte Bhavi	1994	Asayam Books	Kozhikode
Kudumba Vijnana Kosham	1999	Maanas Foundation	Kozhikode
Kochi 2000	2000	Cochin Corporation	Ernakulam
T.K Ramakrishnan	2001	CPI (M) Dist. Committee	Ernakulam
Changampuzha: Selected Poems	2008	Green Books	Thrissur
Selected Essays	2008	Kerala Sahitya Akademi	Thrissur

== Controversies ==
Sanu resigned from the award selection committee and chairmanship of the Vayalar Ramavarma Memorial Trust (VRMT) in September 2019, specifying that he was suffering from health issues. A few days later, during an interview, he clarified the controversy of his resignation from the Trust. Sanu stated that he was being pressurised to select a book which, according to him, scored the least during evaluation. He also said that the piece Nireeshwaran by author V. J. James had scored the highest points in the last stage of the assessment. Later in September 2019, VRMT chose Nireeshwaran by V. J. James for the Vayalar Rama Varma Literary Award 2019.
