= Erumeli Parameswaran Pillai =

Indian (Malayalam-language) writer, teacher, scholar, and literary critic (1932–2014)

- Born: Parameswaran Pillai; 12 December 1932; Erumeli, Travancore
- Died: 7 February 2014 (aged 81); Mavelikkara, Kerala, India
- Education: Kerala University; Madras University
- Occupations: Writer, teacher, scholar
- Spouse: S. Saradamma (m.1957–2014)
- Children: 3
- Writing career
- Pen name: Erumeli
- Language: Malayalam
- Genres: Novel, short story, scholarly literature, literary criticism
- Notable awards: Kerala Sahitya Akademi Award

Erumeli Parameswaran Pillai (12 December 1932 – 7 February 2014) was a Malayalam-language writer, teacher, scholar, and literary critic from Kerala, India. He wrote over forty books, including five novels, four collections of stories, 11 scholarly works, and a few one-act plays and children's literature. He is also known for the work Malayala Sahityam Kalaghattangaliloode, a comprehensive history of Malayalam literature. He received the Kerala Sahitya Akademi Award for Overall Contributions in 2009.

== Biography ==
Pillai was born on 12 December 1932 in Erumeli in the Kottayam district as the son of Velamparampil Krishna Pillai and Lakshmikuttyamma. He obtained MA degrees in Malayalam and Sociology from the University of Kerala and an MEd degree from the University of Madras. He became a school teacher in 1952 and worked in Travancore Devaswom Board High Schools in Erumeli, Thakazhi and Tiruvalla. He became a teacher at Farooq Training College near Calicut in 1964. In Calicut, he flourished as a writer, mainly influenced by the friendship he had with famous writers of the time Vaikom Muhammad Basheer and S. K. Pottekkatt.

He was the Secretary of Kerala Sahitya Akademi (1988–91) and the first Principal of the Kottayam BEd Centre of the Mahatma Gandhi University. He conducted several training programmes at regional and national levels on literacy, adult education, library science, and language teaching. He was a member of the Faculties of Education and the Board of Studies of the Universities of Kerala and Calicut. He worked as the State Secretary of Deshabhimani Study Circle and as the General Secretary and State Secretary of Progressive Arts and Literature Society.

Pillai published his first story "Oru Nalla Manushyan" on 18 March 1956 in the weekend edition of Deshabandhu. In 1974, he started a printing press called Yuvakala in Calicut after realising the high costs and delays in publishing books. In 1980, the printing press was shifted to Chettikulangara under the name Pratibha Press. He also established a publishing company called Pratibha Books in Chettikulangara, which was inaugurated by Thakazhi Sivasankara Pillai. Pillai closely associated with P. N. Panicker in the activities of Kerala Grandhasala Sangham. An avid book lover, Pillai had a collection of over 25,000 books in his home library.

Pillai published over forty books. His novels include Pennu, Nizhalukal, Lady Teacher, Oru Premathinte Katha, and Malayile Manka. Autographum Neela Kannukalum, Theliyatha Kalpadukal, Pazhaya Bandhavum Puthiya Vazhitharakalum, and Anthivelicham are some of his short story collections. He published several books on education and also authored the book Malayala Sahityam Kalaghattangaliloode, which is a comprehensive history of Malayalam literature over the years.

In 1957, Pillai married S. Saradamma, a native of Chettikulangara in Alleppey district. Pillai who originally hailed from Erumeli lived most of his life in Chettikulangara. Pillai suffered a heart attack on 7 February 2014 and died the same day at a private hospital in Mavelikkara. The Sakthi Erumeli Award given as part of the Abu Dhabi Sakthi Awards, is instituted in his memory.

== Bibliography ==
=== Fiction ===
Novels

Year	Title	Title in Malayalam	Publisher
1962	Lady Teacher	ലേഡിടീച്ചർ	Champakulam: B.K.M. Book Depot
1963	Malayile Manka	മലയിലെ മങ്ക	Champakulam: B.K.M. Book Depot
1964	Pennu	പെണ്ണ്‌	Kottayam: N.B.S.
1966	Nizhalukal	നിഴലുകൾ	Trichur: Current Books
1968	Oru Premathinte Katha	ഒരു പ്രേമത്തിന്റെ കഥ	Champakulam: B.K.M. Book Depot

Short story collections

Year	Title	Title in Malayalam	Publisher
1962	Autographum Neela Kannukalum	ഓട്ടോഗ്രാഫും നീലക്കണ്ണുകളും	Quilon: Sree Rama Vilasom
1967	Theliyatha Kalpadukal	തെളിയാത്ത കാല്‌പാടുകൾ	Kottayam: N.B.S.
1967	Pazhaya Bandhavum Puthiya Vazhitharayum	പഴയ ബന്ധവും പുതിയ വഴിത്താരയും	Kottayam: Vidyarthi Mithram
1976	Anthivelicham	അന്തിവെളിച്ചം	Chettikulangara: Jayanthi
1998	Erumeliyude Kathakal	എരുമേലിയുടെ കഥകള്‍	Mavelikkara: Prathibha Books

Children's literature

Year	Title	Title in Malayalam	Publisher
1965	Adrishya Manushyan	അദൃശ്യ മനുഷ്യൻ	Champakulam: B.K.M. Book Depot
1968	Bala Sakuntalam	ബാലശാകുന്തളം	Kottayam: Vidyarthi Mithram
1977	Veera Charitangal	വീരചരിതങ്ങൾ	Kottayam: Vidyarthi Mithram
1977	Kochu Komban	കൊച്ചുകൊമ്പൻ	Chettikulangara: Jayanthi
1980	Uttara Rama Charitam	ഉത്തരരാമചരിതം	Kottayam: N.B.S.

One-act play

Year	Title	Title in Malayalam	Publisher
1965	Kannuneerum Punchiriyum	കണ്ണുനീരും പുഞ്ചിരിയും	Kottayam: Vidyarthi Mithram
1991	Dharmakshetre Kurukshetre	ധർമ്മക്ഷേത്രേ കുരുക്ഷേത്രേ	Trichur: Current Books

=== Non-fiction ===
Books on education

Year	Title	Title in Malayalam	Publisher
1966	Malayala Bhashadhyapanam	മലയാള ഭാഷാധ്യാപനം	Kottayam: Vidyarthi Mithram
1966	Vidyabhyasa Manasastram	വിദ്യാഭ്യാസ മനഃശാസ്‌ത്രം	Kottayam: Vidyarthi Mithram
1966	Vidyabhyasa Tatvangalum Vidyala Ghatanayum	വിദ്യാഭ്യാസതത്വങ്ങളും വിദ്യാലയഘടനയും	Kottayam: Vidyarthi Mithram
1969	Vidyabhyasavum Desiya Vikasanavum: Kothari Commission Oru Pathanam	വിദ്യാഭ്യാസവും ദേശീയ വികസനവും -കൊഠാരി കമ്മീഷൻ ഒരു പഠനം	Kottayam: Vidyarthi Mithram
1974	Vidyabhyasam Puthiya Kazhchapadil	വിദ്യാഭ്യാസം പുതിയ കാഴ്‌ചപ്പാടിൽ	Kottayam: S.P.C.S.
1979	Primary Vidyabhyasam: Tatvangalum Prasnangalum	പ്രൈമറി വിദ്യാഭ്യാസം: തത്ത്വങ്ങളും പ്രശ്‌നങ്ങളും	Kottayam: S.P.C.S.
1980	Arogya Kayika Vidyabhyasam	ആരോഗ്യ കായിക വിദ്യാഭ്യാസം	Kottayam: Auroville
1988	Vidyalaya Bharanavum Ghatanayum	വിദ്യാലയഭരണവും ഘടനയും	Kottayam: Vidyarthi Mithram
	Adhunika Vidyabhyasam: Prasnavum Sameepanavum	ആധുനികവിദ്യാഭ്യാസം, പ്രശ്‌നവും സമീപനവും	
	Vidyalaya Bharanavum Sanghadanavum	വിദ്യാലയ ഭരണവും സംഘാടനവും	

Literary criticism, essays and scholarly literature

Year	Title	Title in Malayalam	Publisher
1959	Poya Thalamurayil Ninnu	പോയ തലമുറയിൽ നിന്ന്‌	Alleppey: Southern
1962	Prathibhashalikal	പ്രതിഭാശാലികൾ	Kottayam: Vidyarthi Mithram
1966	Malayala Sahityam Kalaghattangaliloode	മലയാളസാഹിത്യം കാലഘട്ടങ്ങളിലൂടെ	Kottayam: Vidyarthi Mithram
1966	Sahitya Nayakanmar	സാഹിത്യനായകന്‍മാര്‍	Kottayam: Vidyarthi Mithram
1971	Natakathileykk Oru Kaitiri	നാടകത്തിലേയ്ക്കൊരു കൈത്തിരി	Kottayam: Vidyarthi Mithram
1972	Sameeksha	സമീക്ഷ	Kottayam: Vidyarthi Mithram
1979	Sahityavalokam	സാഹിത്യാവലോകം	Calicut: Deshabhimani
1991	Avar Engane Chinthikkunnu	അവർ എങ്ങനെ ചിന്തിക്കുന്നു	Kottayam: N.B.S.
1992	Alochana	ആലോചന	Kottayam: S.P.C.S.
1999	Akshara Deepangal	അക്ഷരദീപങ്ങൾ	Mavelikkara: Prathibha
	Nammude Sahityakaranmar	നമ്മുടെ സാഹിത്യകാരൻമാർ	

Pen-picture (Thoolikachitram)

Year	Title	Title in Malayalam	Publisher
1963	Keralathile Ezhuthukar	കേരളത്തിലെ എഴുത്തുകാർ	Thuravoor: Narasimha Vilasom
