= Pangil Bhaskaran =

Indian novelist

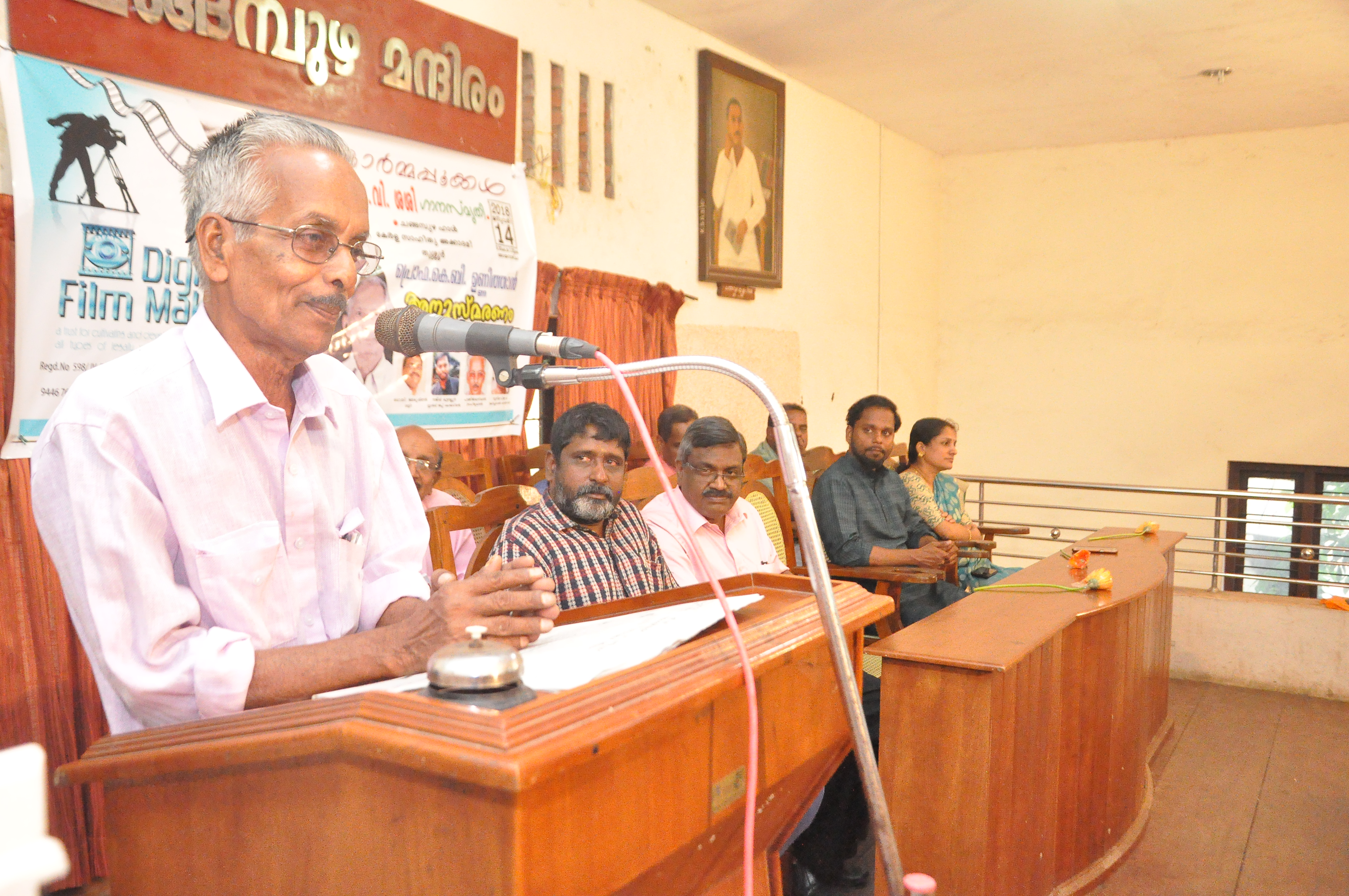
- Bhaskaran in 2018
- Born: P.G. Bhaskaran; February 1945 (age 80–81); Eyyal, Kechery, Thrissur district, Kerala
- Occupations: Writer, author
- Years active: 1990
- Known for: Pattunoolppuzhukkal
- Spouse: Leela Bhaskaran

Pangil Bhaskaran is an Indian novelist, writing in Malayalam.

== Biography ==
Pangil Bhaskaran was born to Pangil Govindan and Kalyani on 1945 February at Eyyal, Kechery, Thrissur district, Kerala. Bhaskaran has also been a parallel college teacher, farmer, journalist. He was a government official in revenue department, retired on 2000. He is married to Leela and they have three children, Shenshi Jayaraj, writer Maneesha Pangil and journalist Bhasi Pangil. Maneesha works at Kerala Sahitya Akademi as the Librarian. She is also guide at Ramavarma Appan Thampuran Memorial Library and Bhasi Pangil works at Kerala Kaumudi daily as the bureau chief at Thrissur unit. Bhasi is a children's writer also.

== Works ==
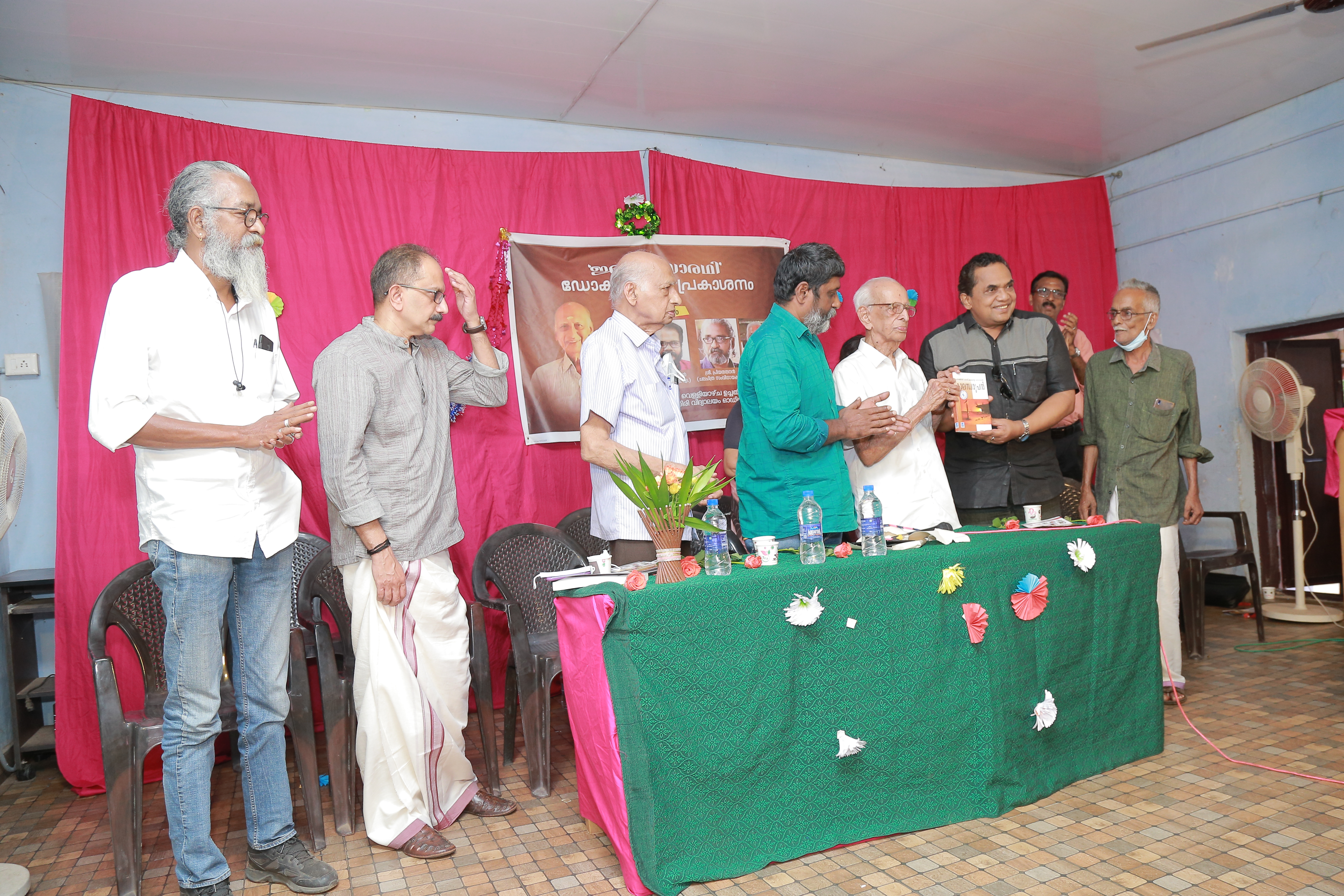
Pangil Bhaskaran's novel, Kalaswaroopan is released by P. Chitran Namboodirippad and received by Shivaji Guruvayoor. Film directors Priyanandanan, Sathish Kalathil and others are near.

- Pattunoolpuzhukkal
- Mulayaruthum Mudi Murichum
- Orumpettaval
- Vellinakshatrangale Thedi (1981)
- Abhishekachadangile Balan (1982)
- Sundarippasu (1986)
- Mezhukuthirikal (1986)
- Oonuvadikal (1987)
- Bhrithyanmar (1990)
- Sahayatrikar (1996)
- Odampal (1999)
- Thanne Parannathum Thalli Parathiyathum (2011)
- Akathalam (2013)
- Oru Njandinte Aathmakatha (2014)
- Veerangana (2015)
- Nandikeshan Sakshi (2017)
- Krishnante Jananavum Sakhavu Sekharanum (2017)
- Engane Kadaledukkunna Kure Jeevithangal (2017)
- Kalaswaroopan (2022)

== Awards ==
- Abu Dhabi Sakthi Award for the novel Bhrithyanmar in 1987.
- Aksharakkoottam Award for 'Akathalam' in 2013.
