= K. Rekha =

Malayalam writer

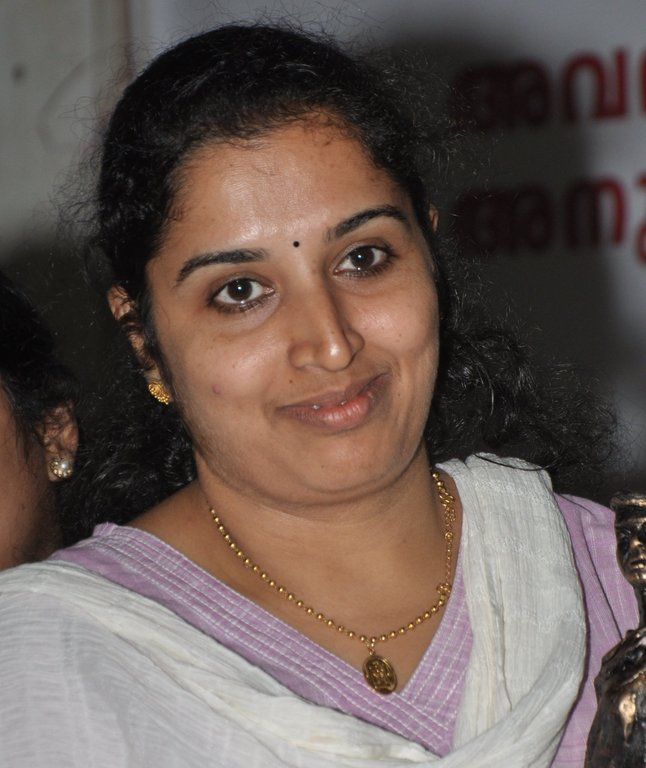
- Rekha in 2013
- Born: Irinjalakkuda, Thrissur, India
- Occupations: Journalist, short story writer, College Lecture
- Partner: Mohanlal
- Children: 2

K. Rekha is a Malayalam short story writer and jo‌urnalist.

She is a Malayalam Lecturer in Bishop Moore College at Mavelikkara.

== Awards and honours ==
She is a recipient of the I.C. Chacko Award instituted by the Kerala Sahitya Akademi for Arudeyo Oru Sakhavu. He work Nunayathi won the Abu Dhabi Sakthi Award for the year 2021 in children's literature category.
