= P. Kesavadev Literary Award =

Indian literary award

The P. Kesavadev Literary Award is an Indian literary award presented annually by P. Kesavadev Trust to recognise writers in Malayalam literature. The award is named after renowned Malayalam writer P. Kesavadev.

== Recipients ==
Year	Recipient	Notes	Ref.
2005	Dr. Indrababu		
2006	P. Mohanan		
2007	NA		—
2008	Jose Panachippuram	For the work Tharangangalil (Essays)	
2009	George Onakkoor	For the work Parvathangalile Kattu (novel)	
2010	M. P. Veerendrakumar		
2011	C. Radhakrishnan		
2012	P. Govinda Pillai		
2013	O. N. V. Kurup		
2014	Perumbadavam Sreedharan		
2015	M. K. Sanu		
2016	G. N. Panicker		
2017	Sugathakumari		
2018	Prabha Varma		
2019	M. V. Pillai		
2020	Vijayakrishnan		
2021	Thomas Jacob		
2022	P. K. Rajasekharan	For the book Dostoevsky Bhoothavishtante Chayapadam	
2023	Desamangalam Ramakrishnan		
2024	Adoor Gopalakrishnan		
