= Kithaab =

2018 Malayalam-language play

- Written by: Rafeeq Mangalassery
- Original language: Malayalam language
- Subject: Gender justice for Muslim women
- Genre: Humorous, Teen drama

Premiere
- Date premiered: November 2018
- Place premiered: Vadakara (Kerala, India)

Kithaab, also Kitab (lit. 'Book'), is a Malayalam-language play featuring a humorous portrayal of a young girl who dreams of calling out the Azaan (vaang), the Islamic call to worship normally recited by a male muezzin or mukri. The girl questions the subjugation of women in her community, and rebels against community norms by dancing with her friends, stealing food denied to her, and demanding the opportunity to call the vaang.

The play is written by scriptwriter-director Rafeeq Mangalassery. It was released in November 2018 in the Indian state of Kerala, at a time when the women's rights movement was taking shape, asking for the right to worship in Sabarimala temple; for Muslim women's right to participate in religious rituals; and for gender equality in religious spaces, including the appointment of women as Imams, and participating in and leading prayers at mosques.

== Inspiration ==
Rafeeq Mangalassery said his drama Kithaab was not directly based on the story of Vaangu, but was an independent adaptation inspired by Unni R.'s story "Vaangu". However, Unni R. distanced himself from Mangalassery's drama, saying it was not in tune with his ideas and was lacking in spiritual value. Malayalam director V. K. Prakash and Kavya Prakash also had an independent plan to adapt Unni R.'s story "Vaangu" for a film of the same name, which was subsequently released in January 2021.

== Plot ==
A Muslim girl wishes to become a muezzin like her father and to call out the azaan. She steals the fried fish her mother cooks for the men in the house and says that doing so is not morally wrong because Padachon (creator-god) would understand that girls are not given enough food. Her father then censures her, telling her that women should get only half of everything that men have. To this, the girl impishly asks why then women shouldn't wear only half of what men do.

Amidst these struggles, she expresses her wish to call out the azaan. Her father answers all her queries by referring to a big book (Kithab), and he locks her away so she would not perform in a play (a play within the play) again. He tells her she will not reach heaven if she continues to do such things.

"If I'd lose entry to heaven because I sing and dance, then I don't want that heaven," she says. The father is even ready to kill the girl when she performs at the school play despite his wishes. When her mother reminds him that he is not just the muezzin, but also a father, he allows her to call out the azaan, and the drama ends with the girl calling out the azaan and the rest praying.

== Controversy ==
Memunda Higher secondary school in rural Kozhikode staged a drama for interschool competition at district level in Vadakara, which won prizes for best drama and best actress at district level, and was supposed to continue to the Kerala state level interschool competition. Kithaab portrays social discrimination against women on various issues in the traditional Muslim family. Many topics such as discrimination against girls in the provision of food, poor education, and the practice of polygamy are discussed. Since the drama deals with gender justice in the context of Islam, it was opposed, and Memunda Higher secondary school's participation in the completion was successfully stalled by religio-political orthodoxy and conservatives invoking faith issues. The play triggered discussion on gender equality and religious intolerance. The drama was staged separately and performed at a later date.

Subsequently, a whataboutery counter-play named Kithabile Koora was also performed on the Malayalam stage, with a female character who seeks freedom of religion. One of the Malayalam theatre activists, Abbas Kalathode, while not enthusiastic about the counter-play either, criticized Mangalassery's Kithaab for not considering a number of recent far-reaching changes in the Muslim community. "Portraying a mukri as the villain in the community is an understatement because other villains have emerged among Muslims," he added. Mangalassery disagreed, replying: "It is not correct to say that the Muslim community has registered a steady progress in social life. There could be changes among Muslims as in other communities. But regressive forces have also started dominating. Purdah, which was the dress of a negligible minority in Kerala, has now become the identity of Muslim women. I know mukri is only an employee in the mosque but he represents the clergy, whose vice-like grip has strengthened among Muslims. The play ends with opening of new vistas for the community." "Here the background is that of a Muslim family, and hence it tells Muslim life. There is no attempt to insult any particular religion," said Mangalassery.

Activists and writers including K Satchidanandan and S Hareesh voiced their opposition against exclusion of Kithaab at the state festival. In a joint statement they condemned the interference of religious organizations on reformative renaissance values and freedom of expression. Cinematographer Prathap Joseph conducted a social media campaign claiming that the withdrawal of the play was a "threat to renaissance values and freedom of expression".

A. Santha Kumar, playwright, wrote via Facebook that "the school has washed its hands by withdrawing the play and surrendering to the dictates of religious leaders. He complains that they have also isolated the author of the play, Rafeeq Mangalassery." Kumar asked why those who speak volumes about "renaissance values" were silent about the isolation of Mangalassery at the hands of "minority fundamentalism".

== Rafeeq Mangalassery ==
Rafeeq Mangalassery is a Malayalam-language script writer and director from Chettippadi (Malappuram Kerala) in India. His drama Annaperuna depicts wastage of food while many others go hungry. He also directed Kottem Kareem.

He won the Kerala Sahitya Akademi Award for Drama for Jinnu Krishnan in 2013 and Kerala Sangeetha Nataka Akademi award for best script for Iratta Jeevithangaliloode (Through the Twin Lives).

== See also ==
- List of Indian writers
- Feminist children's literature
- Islam in Kerala
- Islamic Bill of Rights for Women in the Mosque
- Islamic feminism
- Islamic Modernism
- Kerala reformation movement
- Liberalism and progressivism within Islam
- Malayalam literature
- Religion in Kerala
- Women in Islam
