= M. R. Raghava Varier =

Indian historian (b. 1936)

M . R. Raghava Varier
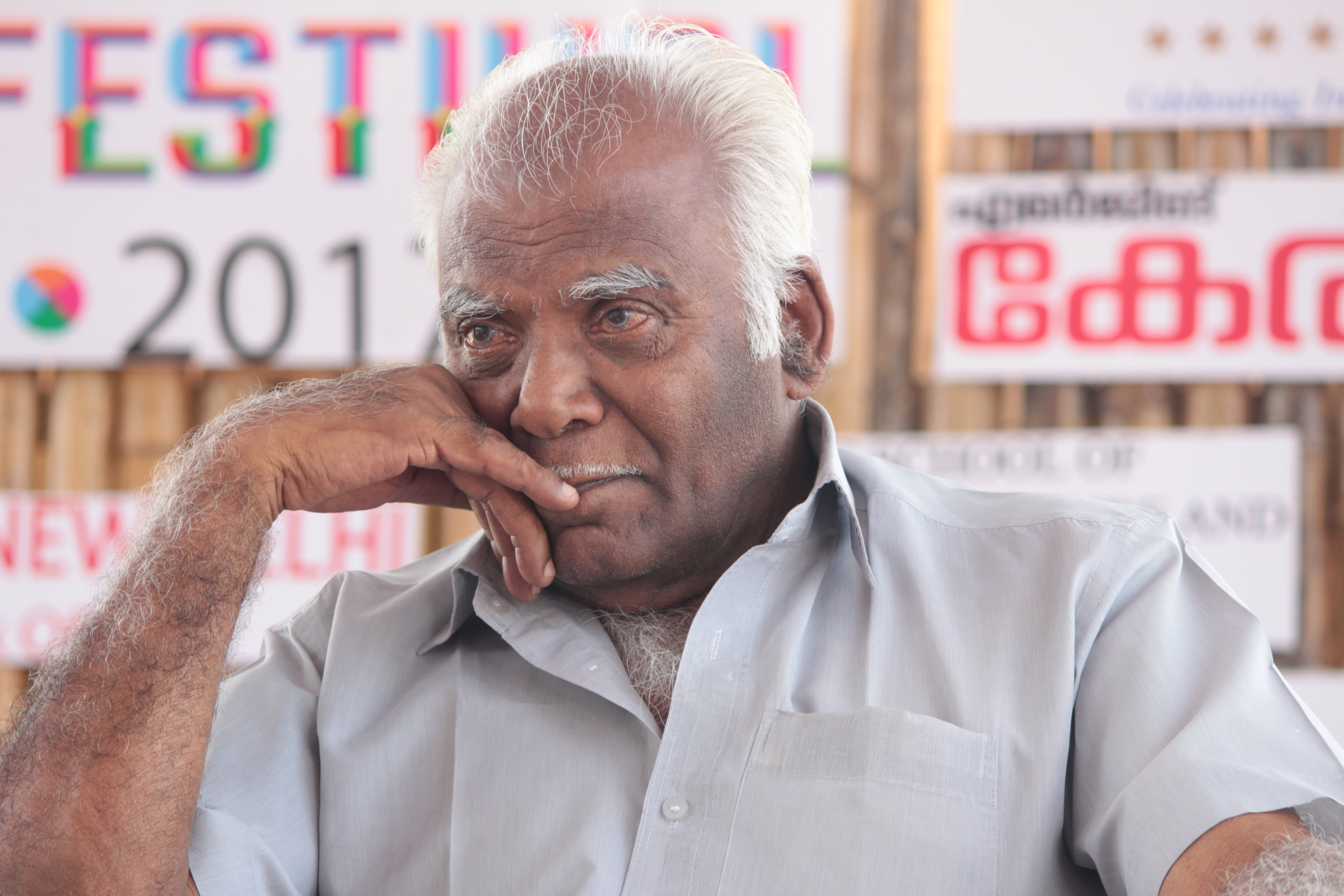
- Born: 15 January 1936 (age 90)
- Education: University of Calicut (under-graduate degree, graduate and doctoral degree); Office of the Chief Epigraphist to the Government of India, Mysore; Jawaharlal Nehru University, New Delhi (M. Phil)
- Occupations: Epigraphist; Academic
- Known for: Kerala History

M. R. Raghava Varier (born 15 January 1936), also M. R. Raghava Warrier, is an Indian epigraphist and historian, formerly a Professor at the University of Calicut, from Kerala. He currently lives in Cheliya, Edakkulam-Koyilandi in Kerala. Varier is generally considered as left historian by political analysts.

== Education ==
Varier graduated from the University of Calicut in 1972 and was trained in epigraphy at the Office of the Chief Epigraphist to the Government of India, Mysore (1973). He holds a post-graduate degree in "Malayalam Language and Literature" from Calicut University (1976), M. Phil (1977–80) in History from Jawaharlal Nehru University, New Delhi and doctoral degree (1986) on folk songs of northern Kerala from the University of Calicut. From 1997 to 1999, he served as Senior Fellow in the Cultural Department, Government of India (New Delhi).

== Awards and recognitions ==
Varier has been invited to a number of institutions, including Maison des Sciences de l'Homme, Paris under the Indo-French Programme (2004), Exeter University (funded by Art and Humanities Research Board, London), University of Tokyo (2010), De Montfort University, London and the British Museum (2012). He served as the President - Epigraphy, Historical Archaeology and Numismatics in 1998 Indian History Congress.

Varier is one of the few Indian scholars to examine medieval Malayalam manuscripts collected in Bibliotec Nazionale de Roma, Rome and Apostoloca Vaticana, Vatican. He is also a member of several federal bodies, committees, trusts, and university senates. He has been involved in a number of projects, including a Japanese project to explore the Chinese pottery in Kerala (1988), and a project on the Historical Atlas of South India (funded by the Ford Foundation) where he was a consultant. He is also associated with the Muziris Heritage Project as a "Consultant" since 2009. He translated ancient inscriptions to Malayalam, it's published and highlighted in the South Indian Inscriptions Volume 43 released by Archaeological Survey of India.

Cultural History of Kerala (1999), written by Varier with Rajan Gurukkal, is a standard textbook for the history of Kerala. His work Jainamatham Keralathil received the Abu Dhabi Sakthi Award in 2012 in the scholarly literature category. He also received the Abu Dhabi Sakthi Award for overall contribution (T. K. Ramakrishnan Award) in 2021. In 2023, he received the Kerala Sahitya Akademi Fellowship.

=== Publications ===
Year of publication	Work	Reference
1990	Varier, M. R. "Trade Relations between Kerala and China 1200-1500 AD". Proceedings of the Indian History Congress. 51: 690–698.	
1988	Varier, M. R. "Marine Technology in Ancient Tamilakam". Proceedings of the Indian History Congress. 49: 114–121.	
2020	Varier, M. R. A Brief History of Ayurveda.	
