= B. Ekbal =

Indian politician

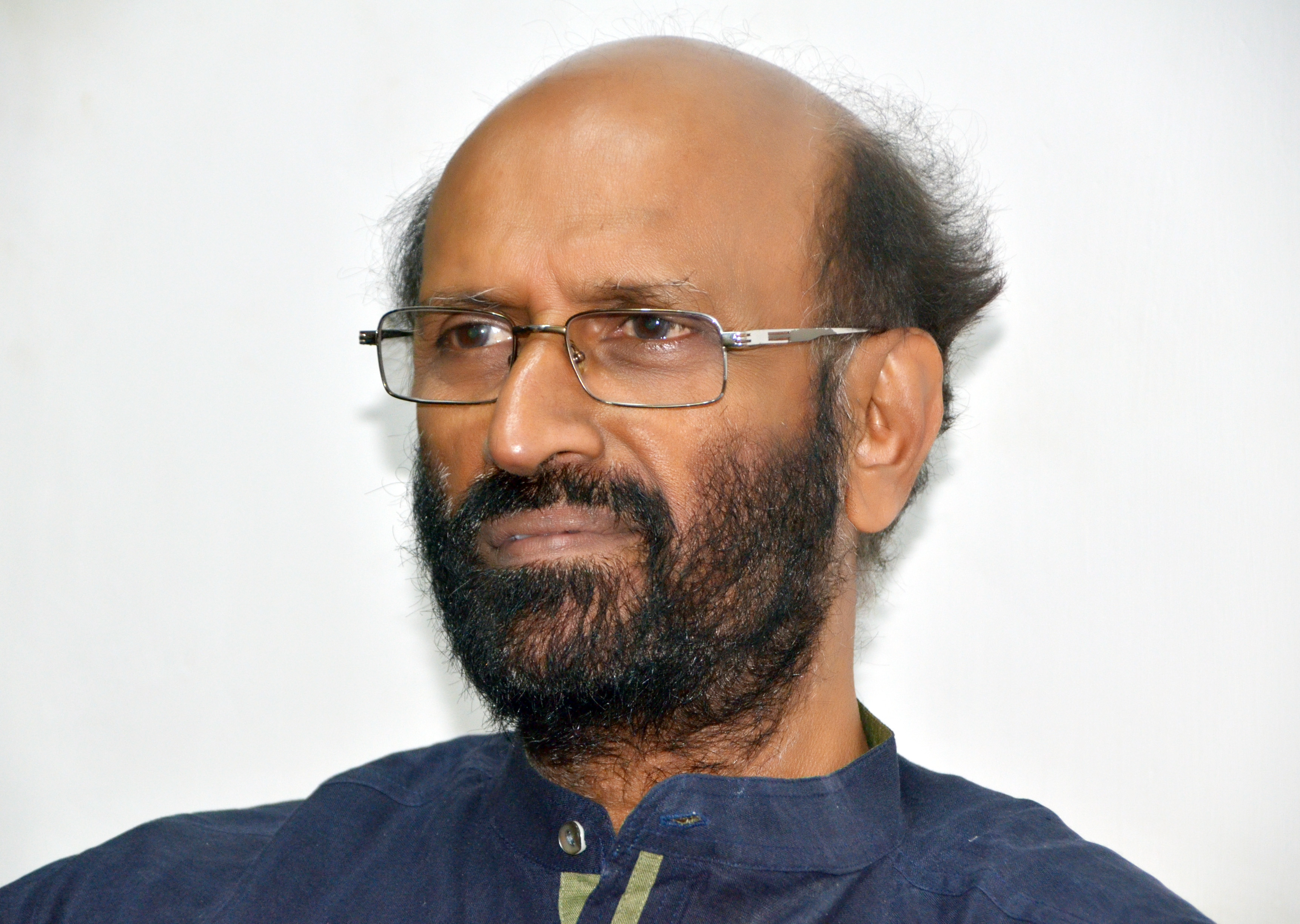
- Born: 1948 (age 77–78)
- Other name: Ekbal Bappukunju
- Education: M.B.B.S., M.S., Mch
- Occupations: Public health activist, Neurosurgeon, Academic and member of Kerala State Planning Board.
- Organization(s): Kerala State Planning Board, Kerala University
- Known for: Health activism, Academic contributions, Planning board member
- Title: Vice Chancellor, University of Kerala
- Term: 2000-2004
- Spouse: A Meharunnisa
- Father: Bappukunju

Ekbal Bappukunju is a public health activist, a neurosurgeon, and an academic in Kerala, India and is serving as a member of the Kerala State Planning Board since 2016. He was the Vice-chancellor of the University of Kerala during the period 2000–2004. He completed his pre-degree from St. Berchmans College Changanacherry. He was a member of the Kerala State Planning Board from 1996 to 2000, during which he vehemently opposed Johns Hopkins University from setting a medical research institute in Kerala in 1997.

He was the chairman of Kerala State Pollution Control Board. He is also one of the joint convenors of Jan Swasthya Abhiyan (Public Health Movement - India).

He was the chairperson of the Expert Committee set up by the Government of Kerala to explore the possibility of setting up a new university of health sciences. The committee submitted its report on the proposed structure and functions of the university in April 2007.

He was former editor of the online Science Journal of Kerala Sastra Sahithya Parishad: www.luca.co.in. His book Indian Oushadha Mekhala Innale Innu received the Abu Dhabi Sakthi Award for Scholarly Literature in 2015.

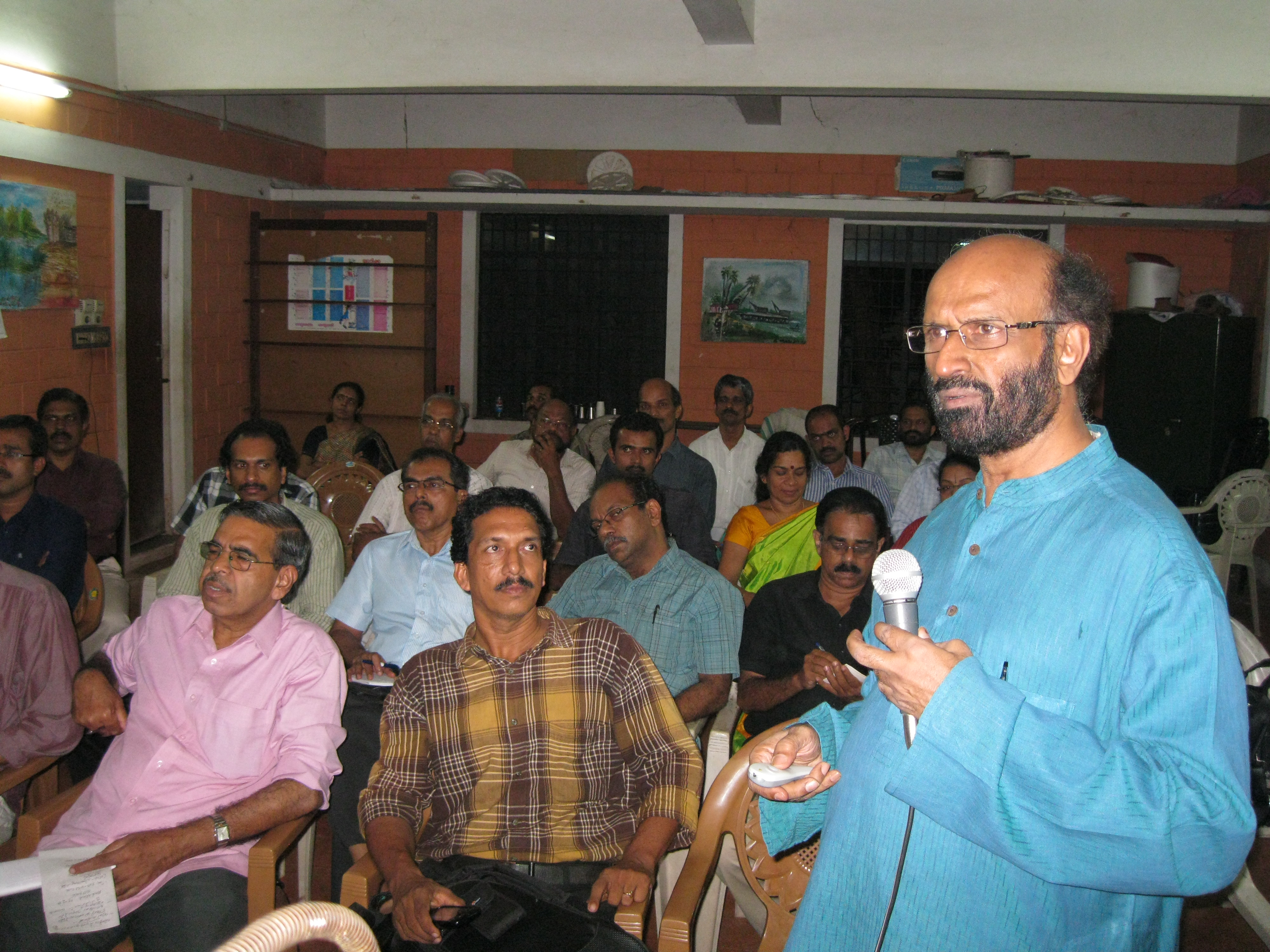
Dr.B.Ekbal presentation

Ekbal is a follower of the Communist Party of India (Marxist) (CPI(M)) from which he was expelled in 2004 by left-wing hardliners. His membership was later restored. He is married to A Meharunnisa, the former principal and professor of anatomy at Govt. TD Medical College at Alappuzha and Kottayam Medical College. She had worked as head of the department of anatomy in SUT Medical College Trivandrum. His niece is married to former MLA of Kattakada I. B. Sathish

== Bibliography ==
- Elamon, Joy; Franke, Richard W.; Ekbal, B. (2004), "Decentralization of health services: the Kerala People's Campaign." (PDF), Int J Health Serv, 34 (4), New York: Baywood Publishing Co.: 681–708, doi:10.2190/4L9M-8K7N-G6AC-WEHN, ISSN 0020-7314, PMID 15560430, S2CID 29112205, archived from the original (PDF) on 1 September 2006
- Ekbal, B. (8 December 2000). People's Campaign for Decentralised Planning and the Health Sector in Kerala. People's Health Assembly, 1st meeting, Gonoshasthaya Kendra, Savar, Bangladesh. www.phmovement.org. Archived from the original on 4 December 2008.
- Ekbal, B., ed. (1988), A Decade after Hathi Committee (Committee on Drugs and Pharmaceutical Industry), Trivandrum, India: Kerala Sastra Sahitya Parishad, LCCN 89903327, OCLC 21041689
