= G. N. Panicker =

Indian writer

G.N. Panicker (born 1937) is an Indian author who won the Kerala Sahitya Akademi award for short stories in 1982 for his book Neeruravakalkku Oru Geetham. He won the P. Kesavadev Literary Award in 2016. Panicker is also involved with highlighting works by other Tamil writers, producing a booklet containing excerpts from the works of eight authors.
