= Kilimanoor Chandran =

Indian writer

Kilimanoor Chandran (born 9 February 1950) is an Indian author, poet, and columnist from Kerala, India.

== Bibliography ==
- Daaham (Thirst)- Novel
- haviss – Novel
- Keralathile naadan pattukal (Folk Songs of Kerala)
- Nammude naadan pattukal (Our Folk Songs) – Anthology of Folk songs
- Malayaalam Bhaasa Adhyaapanam
- 1995: Rajaravivarmayum chithrakalayum – Biography
- 2004: Chorappookkal viriyicha Kallara – Pangode – Freedom Struggle

== Awards ==
- 2010 – Abu Dhabi Sakthi Award in other categories of literature by Raja Ravi Varmayude Nizhalil Manjupoya Raja Raja Varma
