= K. N. Ezhuthachan =

Indian writer

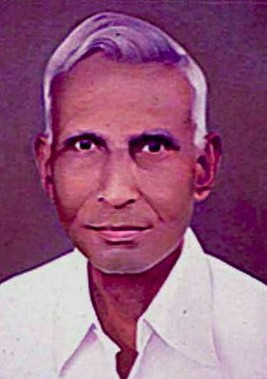
- Born: Kudiyirikkal Narayanan Ezhuthachan; 21 May 1911; Cherpulassery in Malabar District, British India
- Died: 28 October 1981 (aged 70); Malappuram, Kerala, India
- Citizenship: Indian
- Education: PhD in Malayalam; Master's in Malayalam, Sanskrit and English
- Occupations: Poet, Teacher, Critic, Essayist, Translator
- Notable work: Keralodayam Mahakavyam
- Title: Doctor (1962); Professor
- Spouse(s): Late Mrs. Janaki Amma (Retd. Teacher, Govt. School, Pattambi)
- Children: Late. Adv. K. Durga Das (Advocate, Ottapalam), Late Dr. Jayam (Retd. Professor, Providence College, Calicut), Late Dr. Ajitha (Retd. Professor, Medical College, Thrissur)
- Parent(s): Kudiyirikkal Krishnan Ezhuthachan, Lakshmi Amma
- Awards: Sahitya Akademi Award; Kerala Sahitya Akademi C.B.Kumar endowment award

Kudiyirikkal Narayanan Ezhuthachan (21 May 1911 – 28 October 1981) was an Indian writer and scholar of Malayalam literature. He was one among the principal followers of the idea of social impact on literature. Ezhuthachan supported Marxist literary criticism and interpreted Indian literary works based on Marxist aesthetics. He won the Sahitya Akademi Award for his work Keralodayam, a long narrative poem written in Sanskrit. He is the first Malayali to win Sahitya Akademi Award in Sanskrit. He died on 28 October 1981 while delivering a lecture at Calicut University.

== Early life ==
K. N. Ezhuthachan was born in the village Cherpulassery in Palakkad district, Kerala, as the son of eye specialist and Sanskrit scholar Kudiyirikkal Krishnan Ezhuthachan and Lakshmi amma on 21 May 1911. He studied basics of Sanskrit from father's Sanskrit school. After passing the Vidwan examination Ezhuthachan began his career as a teacher and taught at two schools. He also worked as a clerk and stenographer in Bombay for a brief period. Later, he took his master's degrees in Malayalam, Sanskrit, and English. Besides he learned languages like Hindi, Tamil, Kannada and Marathi. In 1953, he joined Madras University as Lecturer and simultaneously worked for his PhD in the same university. After completing his PhD on Bhashakautaleeyam, Ezhuthachan joined University of Calicut as a Lecturer. He also served as a Senior Research Officer at Kerala State Institute of Languages, Research Fellow of Dravidian Linguistics Association and visiting professor at University of Calicut.

K. N. Ezhuthachan had worked for the formation of institutions like Thaaliyola grantha library: a library for old Palm-leaf manuscript, Which was established in 1971 under Malayalam Departement of the University of Calicut. And Vallathol educational trust, A trust formed in 1977 in memory of Vallathol Narayana Menon.

== Literary career ==
Dr.K. N. Ezhuthachan was the author of many books in Malayalam, including short stories, poems, and essays. His book, The history of the grammatical theories in Malayalam published in 1975, is considered to be a seminal work in the field of Malayalam grammar. He has also authored a research thesis on Thunchath Ezhuthachan's Adhyathma Ramayanam and scholarly article about Kilippattu.

=== Works ===
==== Biography ====
- Ishwar Chandra Vidyasagar

==== Stories ====
- Kadhamalika
- Kadhabhooshanam
- Kadhamanjusha
- Kadhasowdham
- Mahilaaramam
- Veerahuthi(Translation of Venisamhara)

==== Poems ====
- Pratheeksha
- Kusumopaharam
- Prathijna
- Keralodayam Mahakavyam (long narrative poem in Sanskrit)

==== Essays ====
- Ilayum Verum(6 Articles)
- Kathirkkula(13 Articles)
- Uzhutha Nilangal(6 Articles)
- Ezhilampala(7 Articles)
- Kiranangal(21 Articles)
- Deepamala(13 Articles)
- Kaaladippaathakal(7 Articles)
- Sameeksha(12 Articles)
- Muththum pavizhavum(7 Articles): Won Kerala Sahitya Akademi C.B.Kumar endowment award in the year 1976.
- Saahithee chinthakal
- Thiranjedutha prabandhangal(2 Volumes)

In addition to these about twenty articles which published in Mathrubhumi weekly, Deshabhimani etc. The essence of Ezhuthachan's essay is radical thinking, logic and simplicity. His essays are best examples for presenting most things in least words with obvious manner. He was co-author for a Malayalam - Kannada Dictionary also.

==== Main Translations ====
- Saarthavahan(Translation from hindi)
- Vaanisamaharam
- Kalayute saamoohyaverukal(Translation of Louis Harap's Social Roots of Arts)
- Lilatilakam English translation(From Four to Eight parts, Not published)
- Tolkāppiyam(Malayalam Translation)
- Purananuru
- Kuṟuntokai
- Naṟṟiṇai
- Aasiayum paasthaathya medhavithwavum(Translation of Asia and western dominance, From English)
- Manushyanum prakruthiyum(Translation of Man and Nature)
- Kavithakkoru Sadhookaranam(Translation of Sir Philip Sidney's An Apology for Poetry)

==== Other research papers ====
- Kilippattu prasthanam - dheerghapadanam In the book Saahithyacharithram prasthaanangaliloode
- Randu bhagavat geethakal- A comparison of Madhava panikkar's Bhagavad Gita and Pattanar's thamizh Bhagavad Gita
- Tharoor swaroopam (Annals of Oriental research, Madras University 1954)
- Ramacarita and its Metres (Annals of Oriental research, Madras University 1957)
- A study of Ramayana Themes in Malayalam: Ramayana seminar, S. V. University 1965
- The morphology of Lilatilakam: Linguistic seminar, Trivandrum 1965
- The problem of meaning: International symposium, Madras 1965
- Modern trends in poetry: International symposium, Madras 1965
- Nationalistic Trends in Indian Poetry: Vallathol - Bharathi Symposium, Madras 1965

==== Articles which added in encyclopedia ====
- Thunchaththezhutahchan (In Encyclopedia published by Government of Kerala)
- The Artisan Classes of Kerala (Social history of Kerala).

== K. N. Ezhuthachan Smaraka puraskaram ==
K. N. Ezhuthachan Smaraka puraskaram is an award given by organisation Samskara pattambi in memory of K. N. Ezhuthachan. It was first given in 2014 to Sunil P. Ilayidom. Malayalam short story writer T. P. Venugopalan received K. N. Ezhuthachan Smaraka puraskaram in the year 2016 for his work Kunnumpuram kaarnival(A compilation of Malayalam short stories).
