= Keralodayam Mahakavyam =

Keralodayam Mahakavyam (Sanskrit: केरलोदयम् महाकाव्यम्) is an epic poem in Sanskrit written by K. N. Ezhuthachan, a scholar in Malayalam from Kerala, India. The poem contains nearly 2500 verses and deals with the entire history of Kerala from its origin up to the formation of the state of Kerala, covering a period of 2000 years. The work received the Sahitya Akademi award in the year 1979.

== Contents ==
Keralodayam Mahakavyam composed of 21 sargas contains nearly 2500 verses and deals with the entire history of Kerala from its origin up to the formation of the state of Kerala. The work is divided into five sections called Manjari's namely Swapna, Smriti, Aithihya, Bodha, Charithra.

=== Swapna Manjari ===
This part deals with the legend of Parashurama, Retrieving the land of Kerala from the ocean.

=== Smruti Manjari ===
This part contains the history of Sangam period and the rule of Chera Kings.

=== Aithihya Manjari ===
Descriptions about the occupation of Aryans in Kerala and myths associated with it.

=== Bodha Manjari ===
The history of the Zamorins as they gain power and formation of their rule in Malabar.

=== Charithra Manjari ===
Deals with incidents from the time of the arrival of the Portuguese in Malabar and the ensuing social changes, to the time of the formation of the state of Kerala. There are also descriptions about the conflicts of native kings and Europeans. This section contains detailed descriptions of the Indian independence movement as well.
