= Desamangalam Ramakrishnan =

- Born: 1948 (age 77–78)

Desamangalam Ramakrishnan is a Malayalam–language poet, translator, critic and teacher. He was born in 1948 in Desamangalam in Thalapilly taluk, Trichur district. He obtained his M.A. degree in Malayalam from Pattambi Sanskrit College. Subsequently, he joined the Calicut University and researched on Malayalam poetry under K. N. Ezhuthachan. He was awarded a fellowship from the Central Ministry of Culture. He worked as a lecturer at various government colleges from 1975 to 1989. He was a professor of Malayalam literature at the University of Kerala till his retirement in 2008. He then served as Emeritus Fellow of U. G. C. in Calicut University (2009-2011).

== Works ==
=== Poetry ===
- Krishnapaksham
- Vittupoya Vakkukal
- Thatha Ramayanam
- Chithal Varum Kaalam
- Kanathaya Kuttikal
- Maravi Ezhuthunnath
- Vicharichathalla
- Ethra Yadruchikam
- Carol
- Badhirathanmar
- Dhanushkodiyile Nizhalukal

=== Translations ===
- Derek Walcottinte Kavithakal
- Sthreeloka Kavitha
- Bharatheeya Kavithakal
- Bhavishyathchithrapadam
- Telugu Kavitha

=== Study ===
- Kavyabhashayile Prashnangal (Editor)

=== Research ===
- Kaviyude Kalathanthram

=== Articles ===
- Vazhipadum Puthuvazhiyum

== Awards ==
- 2000: P. Kunhiraman Nair Award — Maravi Ezhuthunnathu
- 2002: Abu Dhabi Sakthi Award (Poetry)
- 2013: Ulloor Award — Carol
- 2014: Kerala Sahitya Akademi Award for Overall Contributions
- 2018: Asan Smaraka Kavitha Puraskaram
- 2019: Abu Dhabi Sakthi Award (Poetry) — Enne Kandumuttanenikkavumo
- 2023: P. Kesavadev Literary Award
