= U. A. Khader =

Indian author (1935–2020)

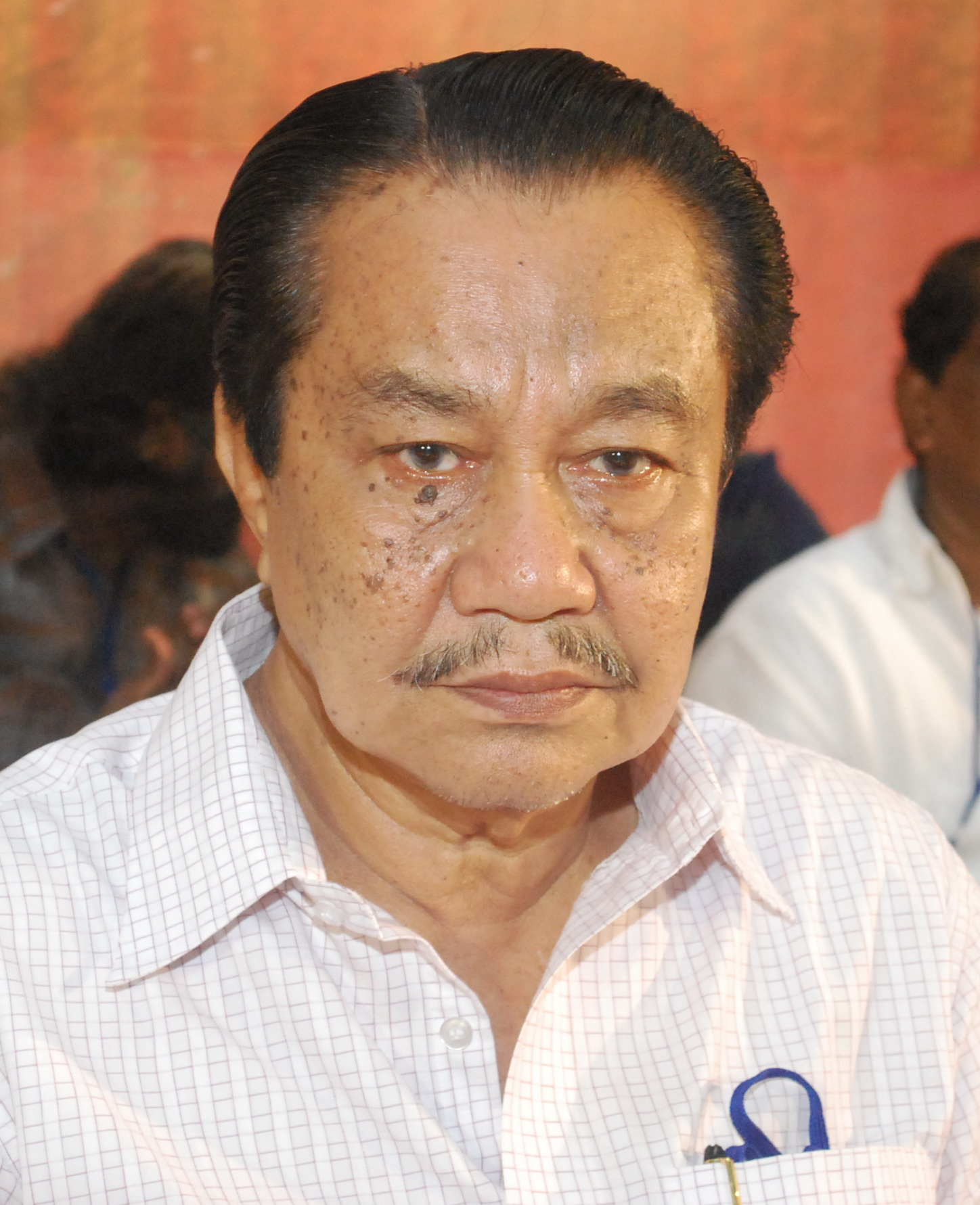
- Born: 16 November 1935; Bilin, Rangoon, Burma, British India
- Died: 12 December 2020 (aged 85); Calicut, Kerala, India
- Occupation: Writer
- Writing career
- Notable works: Thrikkotur Peruma, Raziya Sultana, Katha Pole Jeevitham, Shathru, Srishtavinte Khajana
- Notable awards: Sahitya Akademi Award (2009); Kerala Sahitya Akademi Award (1984)

Ussangaantakathu Abdul Khader (16 November 1935 – 12 December 2020) was an Indian author. He published in Malayalam, including novels, novellas, short stories, travelogues and non-fiction. His works have been translated to various languages including English, Hindi and Kannada. He was a recipient of the Sahitya Akademi Award in 2009 for his novella Thrikkottur Novellakal and had earlier received the Kerala Sahitya Akademi Award in 1984 for Thrikkottur Peruma.

== Early life ==
Khader was born on 16 November 1935, in Bilin, Mon State, near Rangoon (now Yangon) in today's Myanmar. His father Ussangaantakathu Moithootti Haji had migrated to Burma from Quilandy, in the southern Indian region of Malabar. His mother, Mamaidi, was of Burmese origin. His mother died three days after his birth, from small pox. With the outbreak of the Second World War, a few years later, his family fled Burma and came to the Malabar Coast, when he was eight years old.

On return to India, he grew up as a Malayali at his father's native place in Quilandy. He completed his schooling from Koyilandy High School. Describing his early days, he talked about the dilemma of straddling two distinct cultures. He also talked of his classmates finding him strange because of his features. He would go on to obtain a degree in painting from the Madras College of Arts. During this period he got in touch with noted writers and social activists such as K. A. Kodungalloor and C. H. Mohammed Koya (who would later go on to become the chief minister of Kerala) during his days as a student in Madras (present day Chennai). His association with Koya would be a turning point, introducing him to books and writing, starting with a copy of Vaikom Muhammed Basheer's Balyakalasakhi.

== Career ==
Khader started his writing career by writing for magazines and journals. His first story was published in the Malayalam weekly, Chandrika, in 1953. The story was based on a real-life incident in which the author had to sell his watch to buy a dinner set as a wedding present for a friend. Khader had written quite harshly about his father and step-mother in the original draft which was later tempered when he handed over the story to C. H. Mohammed Koya, who had it tweaked before publishing it in Chandrika. Khader would take Koya's message and leave his own personal stories out of his works through his career, with the note that the story was not a space for the author's personal grief, but should instead talk to society.

He was the president of Purogamana Kala Sahitya Sangham, an organization of artists, writers and art and literature enthusiasts based in Kerala. Over his career, he wrote over 70 books spanning short stories, fiction and non-fiction novels, and travelogues. Some of his notable works included Thrikkottur Peruma, Aghorasivam, Arabikadalinte, Arippravinte Premam, Chempavizham, Katha Pole Jeevitham, Kalasam, Khuraisikkoottam, and Krishnamaniyile Theenaalam, Raziya Sultana, Shathru, Srishtavinte Khajana, and Theeram. His books were translated into many languages including English, Kannada, Tamil, and Hindi. In his travelogue Ormakalude Pegoda (transl. Pagoda of Memories), which was serialised in Madhyamam Weekly in January 2012, he describes his nostalgic experiences when he visited his hometown Yangon after 70 years.

His works often focused on the Northern Malabar region of Kerala and the rural life here, with stories building on local myths, customs, and rituals, including the nagappattu and theyyam. He notably shunned modernism in his works while sticking to local stories. He would say about his choice of stories, "Modernism pushed away the readers at the base. Writers were writing of urban life and alienation that the common man could not relate to." His women characters were noted to have a "characteristic spunk" having independent views and having a mythical aura with celestial beings, Yakshinis, as physical manifestations of the metaphorical idea of beauty, making regular appearances. He draws on celestial characters like Unniyarcha to demonstrate bravery. His works also spoke about familial migrations with households being run by women, when the menfolk emigrating for work to places like Myanmar and Singapore.

Khader worked with the Kerala state government's health department administrative division between 1964 and 1990. During this time he was deputed to the Kozhikode Akashvani (Radio) division between 1967 and 1972. He had also worked briefly with the Institute of Maternal and Child Health within the Government Medical College in Kozhikode.

He was a recipient of the Sahitya Akademi Award in 2009 for his novella Thrikkottur Novellakal and had earlier received the Kerala Sahitya Akademi Award for Thrikkotur Peruma in 1983.

== Death ==
He died on 12 December 2020 at a private hospital in Calicut. He had been suffering from respiratory ailments and was also undergoing treatment for cancer. Earlier in 2019, the Kerala state government had decided to cover his treatment expenses.

== Bibliography ==
- Khader, U. A. (1962). Kōl̲i mūnnuvaṭṭaṃ kūkuṃ munpȧ. Koṭuṅṅallūr: Kēraḷā Bukkȧ Hausȧ. OCLC 20432615.
- Khader, U. A. (1962). Kāṭṭile kathakaḷ, kāṭṭuvargakkāre sambandhicca kathakaḷ. Kōl̲ikkōṭȧ: Pi. Ke. Br̲adērsȧ. OCLC 20432617.
- Khader, U. A. (1965). Vaḷḷūramma: nōval. Kōl̲ikkōṭȧ: Pi. Ke. Br̲adēl̲s. OCLC 31932084.
- Khader, U. A. (1966). Caṅṅala, nōval. Kōṭṭayaṃ: Sāhityapr̲avartaka Sahakaraṇasaṅghaṃ. OCLC 20432622.
- Khader, U. A. (1967). Pr̲ēmapūrvaṃ: cer̲ukathakaḷ. Kōl̲ikkōṭȧ: Pi. Ke. Br̲adēl̲s. OCLC 31932022.
- Khader, U. A. (1967). Śatr̲u, nōval. Tiruvanatapuraṃ: Purabhātȧ Bukkhausȧ. OCLC 31933066.
- Khader, U. A. (1972). Missis Mēnōn: nōval. Kōṭṭayaṃ: Sāhityapr̲avarttaka Sahakaraṇasaṅghaṃ : [Sales Dept.], Nāṣanal Bukkst̲āḷ. OCLC 30905286.
- Khader, U. A. (1972). Yamunayuṭe ur̲akaḷ: nōval. Kottayam: Auroville Publishers] : Vitaraṇaṃ, Vidyārtthimitr̲aṃ Bukkuḍippō. OCLC 30865223.
- Khader, U. A. (1972). Iṇayuṭe vēdāntaṃ: nōval. Tr̥śūr: Āminā Bukkȧ St̲āḷ. OCLC 30903436.
- Khader, U. A. (1974). Khuraisi koottam. Kottayam: S.P.C.S.
- Khader, U. A. (1974). Khur̲aiśikkūṭṭaṃ: nōval. Kottayam: Auroville Publishers : Vitaraṇaṃ, Vidyārtthimitr̲aṃ Bukkuḍippō. OCLC 39768778.
- Khader, U. A. (1979). Ar̲abikkaṭalint̲e tīraṃ: nōvaḷ. Kōṭṭayaṃ: Vidyārthimitr̲aṃ Bukkuḍippo. OCLC 6148197.
- Khader, U. A. (1981). Kunchabdulla Hajiyum Koottarum. Kottayam: D.C. Books.
- Khader, U. A. (1986). Aṭiyādhāraṃ. Kōl̲ikkōṭ: Mātr̥bhumi Print̲iṅg ānt̲ Pabḷiṣiṅg Kampani. OCLC 18636474.
- Khader, U. A. (1988). Kadhar Ennal. Kōṭṭayaṃ: Ḍi. Si. Buks : Distributors, Current Books. OCLC 23925165.
- Khader, U. A. (1990). Nanikuttiyede nadu. Kottayam: S.P.C.S.
- Khader, U. A. (1992). Srastavinte Khajana Novalettukal. Tr̥śūr: Kar̲ant̲ Buks. OCLC 31241343.
- Khader, U. A. (1993). Thrikkottur Kathakal. Kōṭṭayaṃ: Ḍi. Si. Buks : Distributors, Current Books. ISBN 978-81-7130-297-0. OCLC 31241307.
- Khader, U. A. (1995). Pumarattalirukal. Kottayam: Ḍi. Si. Buks. ISBN 978-81-7130-555-1. OCLC 35241032.
- Khadar, U. A. (1996). Katha Pole Jeevitham. DC Books. ISBN 978-81-7130-119-5.
- Khader, U. A. (1999). Krishnanmaniyie Tinalam Kathakal. Kottayam: Ḍi. Si. Buks : Distributors, Current Books. ISBN 978-81-7130-989-4. OCLC 44167509.
- Khader, U. A. (2000). Aghorasivam. Kottayam: Ḍi. Si. Buks : Distributors, Current Books. ISBN 978-81-264-0112-3. OCLC 45438645.
- Khader, U. A. (2002). Mesavilakku: Novel. Tr̥śśūr: Kar̲ant̲ Buks : Distribution, CosmoBooks. OCLC 52326541.
- Khader, U. A. (2004). Poomarathalirukal. Kozhikode: Lipi Publications.
- Khader, U. A.; Tilak, Ḍō. Pi. Ke (2004). Kalasam. Kottayam: Ḍi. Si. Buks. ISBN 978-81-264-0902-0. OCLC 60393169.
- Khader, U. A. (2006). Nanikkuttiyute Nat. Thrissur: Grīn Buks. ISBN 978-81-88582-87-7. OCLC 70200280.
- Khader, U. A. (2007). Anuragam ivan padumpol. Kozhikode: Green Books. ISBN 978-81-8423-086-4.
- Khader, U. A. (2007). Mesavilakku. Kozhikode: Poorna Publications. ISBN 978-81-300-0723-6.
- Khader, U. A. (2007). Malayalathinte suvarna kathakal. Thrissur: Green Books. ISBN 978-81-8423-087-1.
- Khader, U. A. (2007). Thrikkottur novellakal. Kottayam: D.C. Bookks.
- Khader, U. A. (2008). Padippura varthamanam. Kozhikode: Mathrubhumi Books. ISBN 978-81-8264-694-0. Archived from the original on 5 September 2022.
- Khader, U. A. (2010). Anubhavaṃ, ōrma, yātr̲a. Kozhikode: Oliv. ISBN 978-81-87474-97-5. OCLC 659307155.
- Khader, U. A. (2010). Vaṃśāvaliyuṭe cōrakkinippukaḷ. Kottayam: Ḍi. Si. Buks. ISBN 978-81-264-2861-8. OCLC 702169224.
- Khader, U. A. (2010). Thrikottoor novellakal. Kottayam: D C Books. ISBN 978-81-264-1708-7.
- Khader, U. A. (2011). Adayala mudrakal: ormakal. Kottayam: Sahitya Pravarthaka Co-operative society. ISBN 978-0-00-017185-6.
- Khader, U. A. (2011). Poomarathalirukal. Kozhikode: Poorna Publication.
- Khader, U. A. (2012). U A Khadarinte thirenjetutha kathakal (2nd ed.). Kozhikode: Poorna. ISBN 978-81-300-0802-8.
- Khader, U. A. (2012). Ormakalute Pegoda. Kottayam: DC Books : Distributors, Current Books. ISBN 978-81-264-3977-5. OCLC 876816870.
- Khader, U. A. (2012). U. A. Khadarinte thiranhedutha kathakal. Kozhikode: Poorna. ISBN 978-81-300-0802-8.
- Khader, U. A. (2013). U A Khader kathakal. Thiruvananthapuram: Chintha pub. ISBN 978-93-83155-26-2.
- Khader, U. A. (2016). Manava kulam. Kottayam: D C books. ISBN 978-81-264-6725-9.
- Khader, U. A. (2017). Aakasavanikkalam. Kozhikode: Poorna. ISBN 978-81-300-1931-4.
- Khader, U. A. (2018). Ente deshabhimanakkalam. Green Books. ISBN 978-93-87357-56-3.
- Khader, U. A. (2018). Thudakkam nenchidippode. Saikatham Books LLP. ISBN 978-93-88343-27-5.
- Khader, U. A. Vaaye paathaalam. Archived from the original on 4 August 2022.

== Awards ==
- 1984: Kerala Sahitya Akademi Award for Story – Thrikkottur Peruma
- 1993: S. K. Pottekkattu Award – Katha Pole Jeevitham
- 1993: Abu Dhabi Sakthi Award (Novel) – Oru Piti Vattu
- 1999: C. H. Mohammed Koya Award – Kalimuttam
- 2002: Kerala Sahitya Akademi Award for Novel – അഘോരശിവം
- 2009: Kendra Sahitya Akademi Award – Thrikkottur Peruma
- 2019: Mathrubhumi Literary Award – Contributions to Malayalam literature
