= N. V. P. Unithiri =

Indian scholar (born 1945)

Noonhil Vadakkemadathil Padmanabhan Unithiri (born 15 December 1945) is a multilingual scholar, author, researcher, poet, progressive thinker, translator and teacher from Kerala, India. He has authored around 200 books in Sanskrit, Malayalam and English languages including translated works.

== Biography ==
Unithiri was born on 15 December 1945 in Kulapuram in Cheruthazham panchayat of Cannanore district as the son of Theke Chandramana Illath Govindan Namboothiri and Noonhil Vadakkemadathil Papappillayathiri Amma. He got his primary education from Cheruthazham Govt. LP School and Pilathara LP School. After completing his SSLC from Madai Govt. High School and Teacher's Training Course (TTC) from Kannur Govt. Basic Training School, he started working as a primary school teacher in 1965. He obtained the Malayalam Vidwan certificate in 1967 and graduated from Calicut University with a Bachelor of Arts degree in Malayalam in 1971 and a Master of Arts degree in Sanskrit in 1973.

In 1974, while working as a language teacher in Kalyassery Govt. High School, he joined Kerala University for his Ph.D. in the Department of Sanskrit. The research was about the literary contributions of Poorna Saraswathi, a 14-the century Sanskrit commentator, poet and dramatist from Kerala. Unithiri became a lecturer at Kerala University in 1975. In 1978, he moved to Calicut University. From 1985 to 1996, he served as the head of the Sanskrit department there. In 1996, he took over as the first principal dean of studies of Sree Sankaracharya University of Sanskrit, Kalady. He was the chairman of the advisory committee of the Department of Culture, Government of Kerala. He retired from government services on 31 March 2006.

== Works ==
Some of Unthiri's works include:

- (1991) Bharatheeya Darsanathinte Ariyappedatha Mukham (ഭാരതീയ ദര്‍ശനത്തിന്റെ അറിയപ്പെടാത്ത മുഖം). Trichur: Kerala Sasthra Sahithya Parishad. ISBN 9789380512396
- (1998) Samskrutathinte Nizhalum Velichchavum (സംസ്കൃതത്തിന്റെ നിഴലും വെളിച്ചവും). Kottayam: DC Books. ISBN 9788171308224
- (1998) Swami Vivekanandan (സ്വാമി വിവേകാനന്ദൻ). Kottayam: National Book Stall.
- (2000) Bhashabhooshanathinte Upadhanangal (ഭാഷാഭൂഷണത്തിന്റെ ഉപാദാനങ്ങള്‍). Trivandrum: Kerala Bhasha Institute.
- (2001) Samskritha Sahithya Vimarsanam (സംസ്കൃതസാഹിത്യവിമര്‍ശനം). Trivandrum: Kerala Bhasha Institute. ISBN 8176382752
- (2001) Vakrokti: Kavya Jeevitham (വക്രോക്തി: കാവ്യജീവിതം - രാജാനക കുന്തകന്‍). Trivandrum: Kerala Bhasha Institute.
- (2005) Nadannuvanna Vazhikal (നടന്നുവന്ന വഴികള്‍). Calicut: Olive Publications.
- (2006) Indian Bhouthikavada Paithrukam (ഇന്ത്യന്‍ ഭൌതികവാദ പൈതൃകം). Calicut: Progress Publications.
- (2008) Athyutharakeraleeyam (അത്യുത്തരകേരളീയം). Kannur: Kairali Books.
- (2008) Pracheena Bharatheeya Darsanam (പ്രാചീനഭാരതീയ ദര്‍ശനം). Kottayam: Sahithya Pravarthaka Co-operative Society. ISBN 9780000101594
- (2008) Sasthravum Samoohavum (ശാസ്ത്രവും സമൂഹവും). Kannur: Samayam Publications.
- (2009) Basheer Muthal O.N.V. Vare (ബഷീര്‍ മുതല്‍ ഒ. എന്‍. വി. വരെ). Calicut: University of Calicut. ISBN 9788177481488
- (2009) Padavimarsanam Samskrithathil (പാഠവിമര്‍ശനം സംസ്കൃതത്തില്‍). Calicut: University of Calicut. ISBN 9788177481358
- (2009) Shabdarthasidhandangal Samskrithathil (പാഠവിമര്‍ശനം സംസ്കൃതത്തില്‍). Trivandrum: Kerala Bhasha Institute. ISBN 9788176388092
- (2011) Ezhuthachan Krtihikal (എഴുത്തച്ഛന്‍കൃതികള്‍). Trivandrum: Thunchan Smaraka Trust.
- (2012) Balachandran Chullikadinte Kavya Prapancham (ബാലചന്ദ്രന്‍ ചുള്ളിക്കാടിന്റെ കാവ്യപ്രപഞ്ചം). 2012. Trivandrum: Chintha Publishers. ISBN 9788126207923
- (2012) Naveenasahithyapadanangal (നവീനസാഹിത്യപഠനങ്ങള്‍ : കെ.ടി., ഉറ‍ൂബ്, ടി. പത്മനാ൯, സ‍ുഗതക‍ുമാരി). Trichur: Kerala Sahitya Akademi. ISBN 9788176902366
- (2012) Vallatholkkavitha (വള്ളത്തോള്‍ക്കവിത). Kottayam: Sahithya Pravarthaka Co-operative Society. ISBN 9780000191656
- (2012) Vijayan Muthal Vishnu Vare (വിജയന്‍ മുതല്‍ വിഷ്ണു വരെ). Kannur: Samayam Publications.
- (2012) Vrikshayurveda Granthangal Oru Patanam (വൃക്ഷായുര്‍വേദ ഗ്രന്ഥങ്ങള്‍ ഒരു പഠനം). Trivandrum: Kerala Bhasha Institute. ISBN 9788120048850
- (2013) Asan Muthal M. T. Vare (ആശാന്‍ മുതല്‍ എം. ടി. വരെ). Kottayam: Sahithya Pravarthaka Co-operative Society. ISBN 9780000194657
- (2013) Kalidasakrithikal (കാളിദാസകൃതികള്‍). Calicut: Mathrubhumi Books. ISBN 9788182658646
- (2013) Prabhavarmayude Syamavadham Oru Padanam (പ്രഭാവര്‍മ്മയുടെ ശ്യാമവധം ഒരു പഠനം). Trivandrum: Chintha Publishers. ISBN 9789383432189
- (2015) Malayaliyute Samskritha Vazhikal (മലയാളിയുടെ സംസ്കൃത വഴികള്‍). ISBN 9788192767543
- (2017) Ormakalile N. V. (ഓര്‍മ്മകളിലെ എന്‍. വി.). Calicut: Mathrubhumi Books. ISBN 9788182671553
- (2018) Ezhuthachan (എഴുത്തച്ഛന്‍). Kannur: Kairali Books. ISBN 9789386822994
- (2019) Adhyathmaramayanam Moolavum Vivarthanavum (അദ്ധ്യാത്മരാമായണം മൂലവും വിവര്‍ത്തനവും). Tirur: Malayalam University. ISBN 9788194087946
- (2019) Mangaatha Ormmakal (മങ്ങാത്ത ഓര്‍മകള്‍). Calicut: Progress Publications. ISBN 9789384638948

== Awards ==
- Puthezhan Award – Pracheena Bharatheeya Darshanam
- Abu Dhabi Sakthi Award (Scholarly literature) – Vrukshayurveda Grandhangal
- Kerala Sahitya Akademi Endowment Award – Vydikam
- 2015: Abu Dhabi Sakthi Award (Overall contribution) (T. K. Ramakrishnan Award)
- 2018: Doctor of Letters (D.Litt.) by Sree Sankaracharya University of Sanskrit
- 2021: Kerala Sahitya Akademi Fellowship
