= Thumpoly =

- town
- Location in Kerala, India
- Coordinates: 9.5188°N 76.3158°E
- Country: India
- State: Kerala
- District: Alappuzha

Languages
  - Official: Malayalam, English
- Time zone: UTC+5:30 (IST)
- PIN: 688 008
- Vehicle registration: KL-04
- Lok Sabha constituency: Alappuzha
- Vidhan Sabha constituency: Alappuzha

Thumpoly is coastal town in the Alappuzha District and is a well-known Christian marian pilgrimage shrine of Kerala. Thumpoly is a coastal town in Alappuzha district, India, and is a well-known Christian Marian pilgrimage shrine of Kerala. St. Thomas Church, Thumpoly, also known as Thumpolipally, is a prominent Marian pilgrimage church in the Ambalappuzha taluk of Alappuzha district. This church, named after Saint Thomas the Apostle, is dedicated to the Immaculate Conception of the Mother of God and her feast day. This church is under the jurisdiction of the Diocese of Alleppey Roman Catholic Diocese of Alleppey. Thumboli is a Christian pilgrimage center with a tradition of faith that is more than 5 centuries old. In the 6th century AD, a few Marthoma Christians migrated to Thumboli and settled there and first established a small church made of thatched roofs. Later, in AD 1600, a church was built in Thumboli using stone and wood. This church, which is the second main church in the diocese, is also considered expected receive elevated to a 'Minor Basilica' pilgrimage church due to its age, tradition and historical importance, and other advantages. It is the main ancient church and one of the largest parishes in the Diocese and Alappuzha. Thumboli St. Thomas Pilgrimage Church is a church included in the pilgrimage tourism of the Kerala State Government. Thumboli Perunnal, the confraternity feast of the Immaculate Conception (Thumpoly Mata), is a very historical feast and is celebrated every year from November 27 to December 15. People of different castes and religions also make pilgrimages here. The Jubilee Year celebration is coming up in the year 2030, which marks the completion of 432 years since the church was founded and also 300th anniversary of the completion of the current church. (Based on the Thomapally of the 6th century AD and the Muthappan Cross of 820, Thumpoly has a tradition and age of more than 1200 years.) Thumpoly It is located at a distance of 80 km from Kochi International Airport, 6 km from Alappuzha city, 20 km from Cherthala, 25 km from kuttandu and 52 km from kayamkulam. It is connected to Alappuzha, Arthunkal, Kochi, Ernakulam by road and railway. It is located on the edge of NH 66 (formerly NH 47).The National Highway 66 cuts through the middle of this town. With the Arabian sea on one side and a small lake on the other, Thumpoly is blessed with beautiful sandy beaches. Thumpoly – purakadu Waves are the famous beach of Chakara in kerala. It is a natural habitat of many rare birds. Thumpoly is famous for its canals, which end their course in the Arabian Sea. There are fishing villages on the beaches. The local population are also involved in coir making. Thumpoli is located on the border of Alappuzha Municipality. Thumpoly shares border with Alappuzha Municipality and Aryad Grama Panchayat. Thumpoly church is the important largest landmark of Thumpoli.

== Etymology ==
It is believed that the name 'Thumpoly' came from 'Thoma Pally' which means Church of St. Thomas. During the period of Portuguese, the place was also called 'Thompolis' which means 'The town of St. Thomas'.

== Thumpoly Church Feast ==
The parish of Thumpoly is renowned for its beautifully constructed church, called after St. Thomas and also dedicated to the Blessed Virgin Mary. The Annual Confraternity feast which lasts for 19 days (November 27 to December 15), is that of the Immaculate Conception, celebrated on 8 December every year. The statue of 'Our Lady' of Immaculate Conception in the church is called 'Kappalottakkari Amma' or 'the mother who came by ship.

== Sites of interest ==
The landmark of the place is a 500-year-old church called St. Thomas Church, which was built by Portuguese. The architectural style of Thumpoli church is an Indo-Portuguese Baroque style.

Thirthassery temple is another important monument in Thumpoly. The typical Kerala architectural beauty can be seen this small temple.

Thumpoly is connected by road and rail. The beach at Thumpoly is a major tourist attraction.

Coir handicrafts is a major cottage industry of the area.
