= A. Santha Kumar =

Indian playwright and screenplay writer (died 2021)

A. Santhakumar
- Born: 1968 or 1969; Parambil Bazar, Calicut district, Kerala, India
- Died: 16 June 2021 (aged 52)
- Occupation: Playwright

A. Santha Kumar (1968/9 – 16 June 2021) was an Indian Malayalam language playwright and screenplay writer from Kerala state, South India. He won the Kerala Sahitya Akademi Award for Drama in 2010 for the work Maram Peyyunnu.

== Early life ==
He was born as the son of Imbichunni Master and Kalyani. He graduated from the Arts and Science College Kozhikode.

== Literary career ==
He had scripted and directed more than 60 plays and published five books. He composed the screenplay for the film Bhoomiyile Manohara Swakaryam.

== Works ==
- Maram Peyyunnu
- Karkkadakam
- Rachiyamma
- Karutha Vidhava
- Chirutha Chilathokke Marannu Poyi
- Kurudan Poocha
- Oru Desham Nuña Parayunu
- Nasser Ninte Perenthanu
- Sugha Nidhragalileeke
- Otta Rathriyuda Kamugimar

== Awards and honours ==
Santhakumar received Kerala Sangeetha Nataka Akademi Award in 1999 for his work, Perum Kollan. He also received Nilambur Balan Award for his overall contribution to the field of drama. He received Kerala Sahitya Akademi endowment for his drama Kurudan Poocha, Thoppil Bhasi Award and Balan K Nair Award for his drama Chirutha Chilathokke Marannu Poyi, Atlas Kairali Award for his drama Mrigashala. He won the Kerala Sahitya Akademi Award for Drama in 2010 for his work Maram Peyyunnu, He also received the Kerala State Institute of Children's Literature Award. He received the Kerala Sangeetha Nataka Akademi Award for drama composition and direction, Bharat Murali Award of Bahrain Drama Theatre, and Pavanan Foundation Award in 2016. He also received Abu Dhabi Sakthi Award for his drama Karutha Vidhava and Edasseri Award for his drama Nasser Ninte Perenthanu. His ‘Swapnavetta’ was published by Oxford University as ‘Dream Hunt’ and it was included in the degree syllabus of Kerala and Calicut universities. His drama Kakkakinavu's English translation was also published by Sahitya Akademi, India's National Academy of Letters' bimonthly journal, Indian Literature.

== Death ==
He died on 16 June 2021, at the age of 52 while undergoing treatment for leukaemia and had been confirmed to have COVID-19. He was cremated at West Hill crematorium.
