= Rafeeq Mangalassery =

Indian script writer and director

Rafeeq Mangalassery is a Malayalam-language script writer and director from Chettippadi (Malappuram Kerala) in India. His drama Annaperuna depicts wastage of food while many others go hungry. He also directed Kottem Kareem.

== Awards ==
He won the Kerala Sahitya Akademi Award for Drama for Jinnu Krishnan in 2013 and Kerala Sangeetha Nataka Akademi award for best script for Iratta Jeevithangaliloode (Through the Twin Lives).
