= Purogamana Kala Sahitya Sangham =

Progressive cultural organisation in India

- പുരോഗമന കലാ സാഹിത്യ സംഘം
- Abbreviation: PuKaSa
- Founded: 14 August 1981; 44 years ago
- Founder: Vyloppilli Sreedhara Menon
- Location: Ernakulam, Kerala, India
- Region served: Kerala
- Field: Literature, Art, Culture
- President: Vyshkhan
- General Secretary: Ashokan Charuvil

Purogamana Kala Sahitya Sangham (Progressive Arts & Literary Organisation), also known as the PuKaSa, is an organization of artists, writers, and art and literature enthusiasts based in Kerala, India. The association was formed on 14 August 1981, under the leadership of Malayalam poet Vyloppilli Sreedhara Menon.

== Presidents of the PuKaSa ==
- Vyloppilli Sreedhara Menon (1981–1985)
- M. K. Sanu (1988–1990)
- M. N. Vijayan (1990–2000)
- N. V. P. Unithiri (2000–2002)
- Kadammanitta Ramakrishnan (2002–2008)
- U. A. Khader (2008–2013)
- Vaisakhan (2013–2018)
- Shaji N. Karun (2018–present)

== General Secretary of PuKaSa ==
- Ashokan Charuvil (2018–Present)
