= Sahithya Pravarthaka Co-operative Society =

Society of writers

Sahithya Pravarthaka Co-operative Society (SPCS) or Sahithya Pravarthaka Sahakarana Sangham is a cooperative society of writers in the south Indian state of Kerala for publication and sales of books. It was founded in 1945 by a group of twelve writers in Kottayam. It merged with the National Book Stall (NBS) in 1949 and has published over 8,400 titles making it one of the largest book publishers in Kerala. The society claims that over eighty percent of the known writers in Malayalam are members of the society.
