= Ronald E. Asher =

British linguist and educator (1926–2022)

Ronald E. Asher FRSE FRAS
- Born: 23 July 1926; Gringley-on-the-Hill, England
- Died: 26 December 2022 (aged 96)
- Occupations: Linguist, educator
- Writing career
- Language: English
- Notable awards: Sahitya Akademi Honorary Fellowship (2007)

Ronald Eaton Asher FRSE FRAS (23 July 1926 – 26 December 2022) was a British linguist and educator specialised in Dravidian languages. He was a fellow of the Royal Asiatic Society of Great Britain and Ireland (1964), a fellow of the Royal Society of Edinburgh (1991) and an honorary fellow of the Sahitya Akademi.

== Personal life ==
Asher was born in Gringley-on-the-Hill, Nottinghamshire, England, on 23 July 1926 to Ernest and Doris (Hurst) Asher. He had a sister called Dorothy and two sons, David and Michael. He won a scholarship to study at the King Edward VI Grammar School at Retford, Nottinghamshire. He completed his Bachelor of Arts in 1950 and was certified in the phonetics French in 1951 from the University College London. He did doctoral research on 16th-century French literature and received a Ph.D. in 1955 from the University College London.

Asher died on 26 December 2022 at the age of 96.

== Career ==
After Asher received his Ph.D., he was offered two lectureships: at The School of Oriental and African Studies (SOAS), University of London and at the Renaissance French of the University College of North Staffordshire. He opted for SOAS and spent four years at its Department of India, Pakistan and Ceylon (now Sri Lanka) under the Department of Linguistics doing linguistic theoretical research in Tamil language.

Asher joined the Department of General Linguistics at the University of Edinburgh in 1965. He was Professor of Linguistics from 1977, was Dean of the Faculty of Arts from 1986 to 1989 and retired as a Vice Principal in 1993.

Asher served as the President of International Association for Tamil Research from 1983 to 1990.

Asher was a visiting professor of Tamil at the University of Chicago (1961–1962), of linguistics at the University of Illinois at Urbana–Champaign (1967), of Malayalam and Tamil at the Michigan State University (1968), of Doctor R. P. Sethu Pillai Silver Jubilee Endowment at the University of Madras (1968), of linguistics at the University of Minnesota (1969), of Collège de France, Paris (1970), of linguistic and International communication at the International Christian University, Tokyo (1994–95), and of 20th-century Malayalam Literature at the Mahatma Gandhi University, Kottayam, Kerala (1995–1996).

== Literary works ==
The Tamil scholar Mu. Varadarajan introduced Asher to the Sangam literature and to the works of Tamil writers Subramania Bharati, Bharathidasan, and Akilan. In 1971, Asher wrote his first book on Tamilm A Tamil Prose Reader with R. Radhakrishnan. He published a second book in 1973, Some Landmark in the History of Tamil Prose. He published National Myths in Renaissance France: Francus, Samothes and the Druids (1993), Studies on Malayalam Language and Literature (1997), Malayalam (1998) co-authored with T. C. Kumari, V. M. Basheer: Svatantryasamara Kathakal (V. M. Basheer: Stories of the Freedom Movement, 1998), Basheer: Malayalattinte Sargavismayam (critical essays on the novels and stories of Vaikom Muhammad Basheer, 1999), Colloquial Tamil: The Complete Course for Beginners (1992) with E. Annamalai, and Wind Flowers: Contemporary Malayalam Short Fiction (2004) with V. Abdulla.

=== Translator ===
Asher translated the Malayalam novelist Thakazhi Sivasankara Pillai's 1947 published work Thottiyude Makan as Scavenger's Son in 1975. He published Me Grandad'ad an Elephant: Three Stories of Muslim Life in South India in 1980 which collectively translated three workks by another Malayalam novelist, Vaikom Muhammad Basheer: Balyakalasakhi (Childhood Friend, 1944), Ntuppuppakkoranendarnnu (My Grandad Had an Elephant, 1951), and Pathummayude Aadu (Pathumma's Goat, 1959). Asher mentioned that the translation for the works of Basheer and Thakazhi ahd been challenging because of their "unparalleled" style and content.

In 2000, he translated Atlas of the World's Languages (1994) into Japanese as Sekai Minzoku Gengo Chizu. In 2002, Asher translated the Malayalam novelist and short-story writer K. P. Ramanunni's debut novel Sufi Paranja Katha, published in 1993, as What the Sufi said with N. Gopalakrishnan.

=== Editor ===
He edited the Encyclopedia of Language and Linguistics (1994), Atlas of the World's Languages (1994) with Christopher Moseley, Concise History of the Language Sciences from the Sumerians to the Cognitivists with E. F. K. Koerner (1995), and Linguisticoliterary: A Festschrift for Professor D.S. Dwivedi with Roy Harris.

== Awards ==
In 1964, Asher was selected as a fellow of Royal Asiatic Society of Great Britain and Ireland, London. In 1983, Asher was awarded the Gold Medal by the Kerala Sahitya Akademi for "distinguished services" in Malayalam. He was elected as a fellow of the Royal Society of Edinburgh in 1991. In 2007, the Sahitya Akademi, India's National Academy of Letters, elected Asher as an Honorary fellow. In 2018, Asher was awarded an honorary doctorate by the University of Edinburgh in recognition of his contributions to linguistics.
