= Balyakalasakhi (disambiguation) =

Balyakalasakhi may refer to:

- Balyakalasakhi, a Malayalam language Indian novel by Vaikom Muhammad Basheer
- Balyakalasakhi (1967 film), a Malayalam language adaptation of the novel starring Prem Nazir and Sheela
- Balyakalasakhi (2014 film), a Malayalam language adaptation of the novel starring Mammootty and Isha Talwar
