= Shabdangal =

1947 novel by Vaikom Muhammad Basheer

Shabdangal ("Voices") is a 1947 novel by Vaikom Muhammad Basheer that deals about war, orphanhood, hunger, disease and prostitution. The whole length of the novel is a dialogue between a soldier and a writer. The soldier approaches the writer and tells him the story of his life. The writer takes down notes and asks questions to the soldier, and responds to the soldier's questions. The novel faced heavy criticism at the time of its publication for its violence and vulgarity.

Shabdangal was the first piece of modern Malayalam literature that addressed homosexuality.

== Plot ==
An infant abandoned at a junction of four roads is adopted by a priest who finds him. The child grows up to be a soldier and participates in the Second World War. Most soldiers returned from the war carrying syphilis but this soldier did not get the disease. During peacetime, his courage earns him a means of livelihood. His curiosity about sex and another's treachery leads him to his first homosexual intercourse, in a state of intoxication. He contracts gonorrhoea and syphilis and becomes a homeless wanderer. The insanity of the world infects him; the meaninglessness of his life and the pain of disease compel him to commit suicide. He does not succeed in his attempt at suicide. Overcome by a desire to confess, he walks into the house of a writer he respects and retells to him the story of his life.

The soldier in the story has never done anything but kill other people. The horror of what he had seen and done during the war haunts him. He cannot take a bath, as he is afraid of blood; to him, water is the blood of the earth. At war, he once killed a friend of his at the friend's request. Blood was flowing from every part of his body; all his skin was gone.

The soldier cannot adjust to life in peacetime. He is furious at "those dyed pieces of cloth": flags symbolizing people's groups with different opinions. He had never known a mother: the sight of breasts fills him with thirst. The first 'woman' of his life turns out to be a male prostitute dressed as a woman. "She.. it.. he" tells him how the street became his home.

The soldier then describes to the writer his encounter with a mother and child, the mother a prostitute. He recounts the circumstances under which the mother kicked him in the chest and later gave him money for food, thinking he was a beggar. He then tells the writer about the failure of his attempted suicide.

== Technique ==
Reading Shabdangal is an aural experience; one can 'hear' the story happen. The title has been translated as 'voices', while the literary meaning of Shabdangal is 'sounds', not necessarily human or other 'voices'. At one point in the story, a blind old man's voice says, "What is there to see in this world? I can hear everything." For most of the time, the reader does not get to see what is happening, but only hears conversations between people or descriptions of sounds.

The soldier in the story narrates his tale; but the author of the book refrains from narration. Even the soldier's narration is minimal, in the form of a spontaneous conversation interrupted by the writer's questions; and at times, the soldier himself puts questions to the writer.

Shabdangal is set in post-World War II, post-Independence India. It was published in 1947; there are only small hints as to the time and place setting of the story. The story can be imagined to be happening anywhere in the world at any point of time in history.

== Comparison with other works ==
Shabdangal stands apart from other major works of Basheer due to various reasons. Balyakalasakhi, Ntuppuppakkoranendarnnu, Paththummayude Aadu, and a number of other works are stories of the Muslim community in which he was born, and the conversational language in these works is colloquial. Mathilukal and Shabdangal for the most part use "standard" literary language. Balyakalasakhi (partly), Paththummayude Aadu, Mathilukal, and Anuraagathinte dinangal (entirely) consist of autobiographical material, but nowhere in Shabdangal can we find a close correspondence to the author's life. Hence, while most of his noted works are considered to be retelling of his life's experiences, Shabdangal is thought of as a work of fantasy (although the events described in it have a touch of realism).

Ntuppuppakkoranendarnnu is also a work of imagination that critiques the ills of society; but it is not often that Ntuppuppakkoranendarnnuis compared to Shabdangal. Ntuppuppakkoranendarnnu attacks age-old customs and superstitions, Shabdangal raises voice against the pretences of modernity; the cloak of 'respectable' moral living on the surface that disguises a degraded social setup. In both works, we see Basheer the humanist, who speaks out against the evils he witnessed in society, be it in the name of tradition or modernity, without caring whom he was speaking against.

== Kesari on Shabdangal ==
Shabdangal creates a "unity of impression" of the world as a mental asylum. This makes it a lengthy short story rather than a short novel, writes Kesari Balakrishna Pillai in his introduction to the book. The literary technique of 'confession' is best suited to the story, because a first person narrative, without simultaneous comments and questions put forth by a thoughtful listener, would have been ineffective in this case. Interspersed in conversation are bits of descriptions of Nature's beauty; and questions as to the origin and evolution of the universe. These are dragged in deliberately; to enhance the effect of 'insanity' which pervades the atmosphere of the story; to contrast the beauty of Nature with the ugliness in various aspects of human life on earth; to demonstrate that physical questions like eradication of poverty and curing of disease are more important than metaphysical questions about the cosmos.

Shabdangal is a challenge to claims of 'respectability'. It sympathetically portrays people suffering from sexually transmitted diseases, gonorrhoea, and syphilis. Balakrishna Pillai, however, sees in Basheer's work a defeatism born out of ignorance of scientific advancements. (Both were writing in the immediate post-war period.)

Shabdangal was the first literary work in Malayalam that talked about homosexual intercourse. Before it, indirect references to homosexuality occurred in Ponkunnam Varki's Nivedanam and Changampuzha Krishna Pillai's unpublished poem Ashramamrigam. Balakrishna Pillai predicted at the time of Shabdangal going to press that it would raise a storm in critical circles. Basheer's writing of Shabdangal is compared to Thakazhi's writing of Thottiyude makan about a profession considered too unclean for literature to deal with.

An old place of worship used by the homeless as night retreat occurs in chapters 9 and 10 of Shabdangal. This part of the book is called "one of the most unforgettable scenes in world literature" by Kesari, who compares it with a hospital scene in Remarque's All Quiet on the Western Front.
