= Mary John (disambiguation) =

Disambiguation name page

Mary John is a feminine given name. Notable people with the name include:

- Mary John Batten (1921–2015), Canadian lawyer, judge, and political figure
- Mary John Koothattukulam (1905–1998), Malayalam language poet
- Mary John Mananzan (born 1937), Filipino Roman Catholic nun, activist, educator, theologian, and author
- Mary John Sr. (1913–2004), Canadian Indigenous leader
- Mary John Thottam (1901–1985), Indian Catholic nun and poet
