= Theatrum Farme =

Theatrum Farme is a project initiated by Bharat Bhavan Kerala, the cultural exchange organization of Department of Culture, Government of Kerala. The project focus to revive the bio-agricultural tradition of Kerala, to awaken the rural theatre and to create a social awareness that the fruits of labour belong to our hapless fellow beings too. Theatrum Farme is a concept presented by Pramod Payyannur who is renowned Dramatist, Film Director and member secretary of Bharat Bhavan Kerala.

It is a scientifically structured project to make the work artistic, sow the seeds for organic farming, drama and charitable activities simultaneously, and to representation harvest, drama and Indian agricultural art forms from sowing till harvest. One of the features of Theatrum Farme is the digital archiving of folklore, agricultural knowledge, oral traditions and songs of the project areas. The project is capable of familiarising agricultural practices among the masses through cultural societies and art forms, bringing back Kerala's agricultural prosperity by greening the arid lands, spreading messages of humanitarian value through village theatre, introducing the art forms which are part and parcel of Indian agrarian culture to the younger generations, sustaining the philanthropic spirit in the society, and acting as a driving force in the state's development. The aim of Theatrum Farme is to spread the light of cultural consciousness, organic agrarian practices, and philanthropic acts among the different sections of the society.
