= Meat Products of India =

Major Indian meat processing, packaging, and distribution company

Meat Products of India Ltd (MPI).
- Type: Public sector
- Industry: Foods, meat products
- Founded: Edayar, Koothattukulam, Kerala (13 March 1973)
- Headquarters: Edayar, Koothattukulam, Kerala, India
- Key people: Dr. Salil Kutty, (2023- ) Managing Director
- Products: chicken nuggets, chicken samosa, sausages, meat balls, bacon, ham, salami
- Number of employees: 81 (31 September 2011)
- Website: www.meatproductsindia.in

Meat Products of India Ltd (MPI) is a major Indian meat processing, packaging, and distribution company based in Edayar, Koothattukulam in the district of Ernakulam, Kerala.

Established in 1973, MPI is a public sector undertaking. The company holds Export certificate from Export Inspection Council(EIC), Ministry of Commerce and Industry, Government of India for the export of pork and pork products to Non-European Union countries.

== Products ==
Products include buffalo, pork, mutton, rabbit, beef, duck and poultry. The processed and semi-cooked products include Nuggets, Meatballs, Sausages, chicken fingers, Bacon, Ham, cutlets, Samosa, pops and Kebabs. Currently, the company produces more than 65 varieties of items.

== Competency ==
In tune with the varied demands of the market, the above range of products are available in different weights and quantity in poly packings.

Meat Products of India Ltd. is a Kerala Government owned company engaged in production and marketing of various meat and meat products derived from pork, buffalo, chicken, muton, rabbit, Duck and Quails. It holds Food Safety and Standards Authority of India, ISO and Hazard Analysis Critical Control Point certification. The products are manufactured under strict veterinary supervision from selected animals free from zoonotic disease. MPI products are available with all leading supermarkets and cold storages throughout Kerala and other states.
