= Premalekhanam (film) =

1985 Malayalam movie

- Directed by: P. A. Backer
- Screenplay by: P. A. Backer
- Based on: Premalekhanam by Vaikom Muhammad Basheer
- Starring: Soman; Swapna; Meena; Captain Raju; Vincent; Mala Aravindan
- Cinematography: Hemachandran
- Edited by: Ravi
- Music by: G. Devarajan
- Release date: 1985
- Country: India
- Language: Malayalam

Premalekhanam (Love Letter) is a 1985 film directed by P. A. Backer based on the novel of the same name by Vaikom Muhammad Basheer. The cast includes Soman, Swapna, Meena, Captain Raju, Vincent, and Mala Aravindan.

== Cast ==
- Soman as Kesavan Nair
- Swapna Khanna as Saramma Thomas
- Meena as Aliyama
- Captain Raju as Babu
- Vincent as Joykutty
- Mala Aravindan as Kunchan
