= Poovan Pazham =

- Short story by Vaikom Muhammad Basheer
- Original title: പൂവൻപഴം
- Language: Malayalam

Publication
- Published in: Viddikalude Swargam
- Publication type: Anthology
- Publisher: S.P.C.S., Kottayam
- Publication date: 1948

"Poovan Pazham" (Malayalam: പൂവൻപഴം; English: Poovan Banana) is a short story written by Vaikom Muhammad Basheer and published in 1948 in the collection Viddikalude Swargam (Fool's Paradise). It is one of the most popular of Basheer's stories. It was adapted into a telefilm of the same name by P. Balachandran.

== Plot summary ==
The story is about Abdul Khader Sahib and his wife Jamila Beebi. Jamila is a B.A. degree holder, while Abdul Khader who is the rowdy of the town has only studied up to school final. Abdul Khader married Jamila, despite objections from their parents and the community, after confessing his love for her. However, he struggles to live up to her expectations of becoming a gentleman and changing his behaviour.

One day, Jamila asks Abdul Khader to bring her some poovan bananas. Abdul Khader agrees, but fails to find them at the local shop. He takes a ferry to find them elsewhere, but he gets distracted by old friends and loses track of time. Unable to find poovan bananas, he buys oranges instead. By the time he sets out to go back home, it is already too late, and the ferry has left. He is left with no choice but to swim across the river in the heavy rain. He finally makes his way back home after a long and arduous journey.

Upon returning home, Abdul Khader shows Jamila the oranges he brought instead of the bananas. She becomes angry and contemptuous towards him. Jamila announces that she is going to bed and refuses to eat the oranges. Abdul Khader tries to convince her to eat them, and when she still refuses, he becomes desperate and resorts to threatening and gently hitting her until she eats the oranges. She even finally accepts his fantasy that he did actually bring home poovan bananas and not oranges. Realising he has gone too far, Abdul Khader feels regret for beating her and expresses his love for her. Many years later, they fondly reminisce about the incident and share a laugh over it. Abdul Khader asks her, what he had brought for her years ago swimming across the river; she answers, 'Poovan bananas'. And how did they look? 'Round like oranges!'

== Reviews ==
Poovan Pazham is one of Basheer's most cherished stories. A review by E. V. Ramakrishnan in World Literature Today noted that Basheer handles the theme of love with great subtlety and charm in the story. A review by Stuart Blackburn in the Bulletin of the School of Oriental and African Studies of the University of London, noted, "Such is Basheer's world: slightly off-kilter, recognizable but exaggerated, where unpredictable emotions and capacity for self-deception create chaos yet invariably end with a small victory for love."

== Translation ==
- K. M. George (1980). "Poovan Pazham" (PDF). Journal of South Asian Literature. 15 (1): 145–154. JSTOR 40872314.
- V. Abdulla (1983). "Poovan Banana". The Love-Letter and Other Stories. India: Sangam Books.
- V. Abdulla (1994). "Poovan Banana". Poovan Banana and Other Stories. Madras: Disha Books. pp. 109–122.

== Adaptation ==
P. Balachandran directed a telefilm for Doordarshan titled Poovampazham based on the short story. The screenplay is by Sreevaraham Balakrishnan. Nedumudi Venu plays Abdul Khader Sahib and Zeenath plays Jamila Beebi. The story also had theatrical adaptations.
