= M. P. Paul =

Indian writer (1904–1952)

- Born: May 1, 1904; Puthenpally Varapuzha, Ernakulam, Kingdom of Cochin
- Died: July 12, 1952 (aged 48); Thiruvananthapuram
- Occupations: Writer, educationist, literary critic
- Spouse: Mary Paul
- Children: Rosy Thomas
- Writing career
- Notable works: Novel Sahithyam; Cherukatha Prasthanam; Saundaryathinte Adhistanam; Chithrakalayum Kavyakalayum; Sahithya Vicharam

Menacherry Poulose Paul (1904–1952) was an Indian academic, educationist, scholar and literary critic of Malayalam. Considered by many as one of the major literary critics of Malayalam literature, Paul inaugurated comparative literature in Malayalam through his works, Novel Sahithyam and Cherukatha Prasthanam. He was the founder of parallel college education system in Kerala, one of the major forces behind the Purogamana Sahitya Prasthanam and was the founder president of Sahithya Pravrthaka Sahakarana Sangham, the writers' cooperative movement.

== Life sketch ==
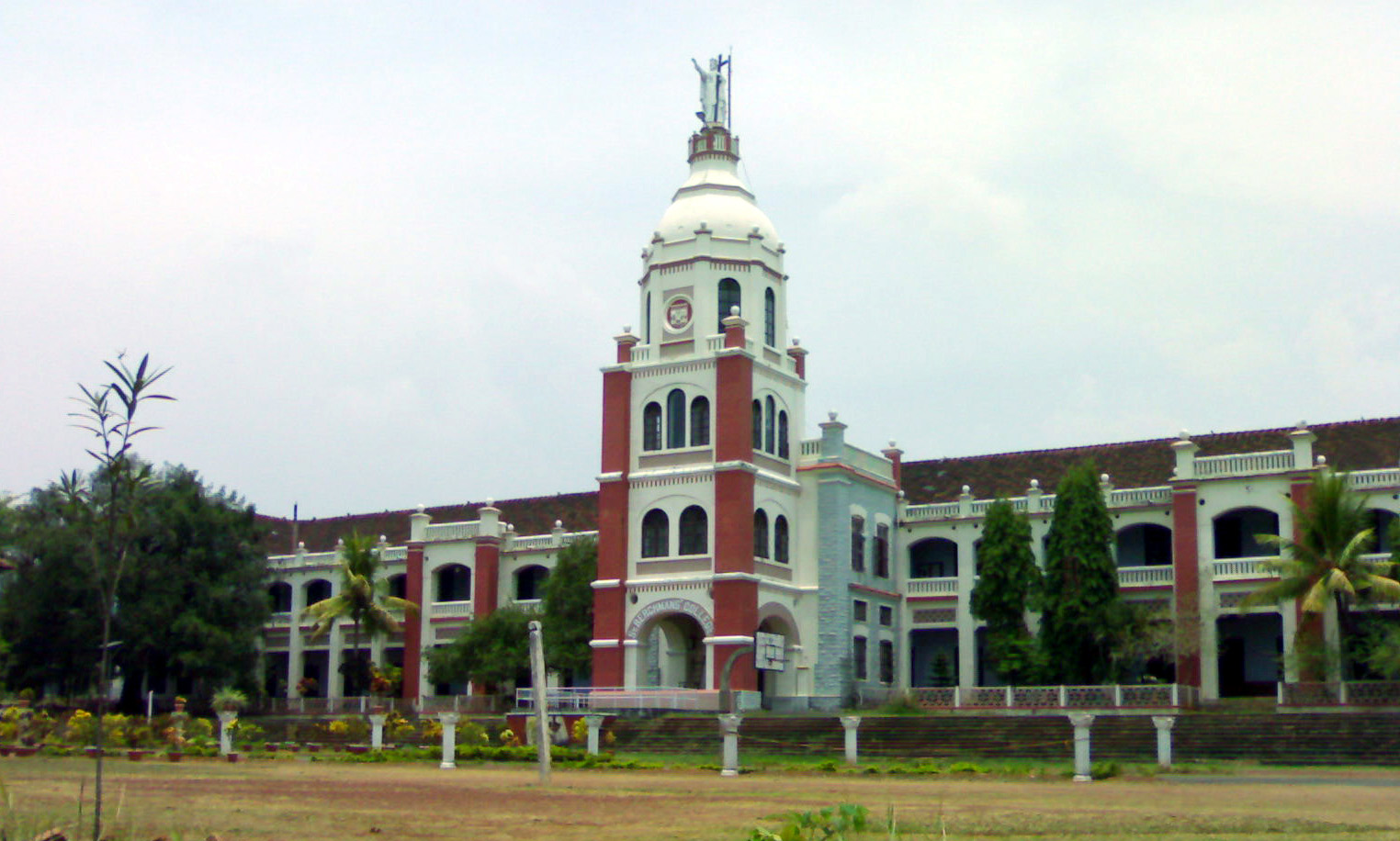
SB College - Paul was a member of faculty for two different periods

M. P. Paul was born on the May Day of 1904 at Puthenpally Varapuzha, in Ernakulam district of the south Indian state of Kerala to Rosamma and Poulose of the Menacherry house. After early schooling locally, he did his high school studies at St. Albert's High School, Ernakulam and though he completed his high school course with scholarship, he could not appear for the Secondary School Leaving Certificate in 1918 as he was under age at the time of the examination. Subsequently, he passed the examination the next year and completed his intermediate course at St. Thomas College, Thrissur before graduating in history from St Joseph's College, Tiruchirappalli in 1924. He started his career as a tutor at the same college following his graduation and during his stay in Tiruchirappalli, he unsuccessfully attempted the Indian Civil Service examination. Returning to Kerala in 1928, he joined St. Thomas College, Thrissur as a faculty and stayed there until 1931; in between, he earned a master's degree in English literature in 1929. In 1931, he was dismissed from service due to his differences with the management of the college which eventually escalated into a court case.

On losing the job, Paul rented a building opposite to St. Thomas College and started M. P. Paul's Tutorial College, the first parallel college in Kerala. Later, he started parallel colleges in Ernakulam and Kottayam and made an attempt to study law which he abandoned after passing the initial examination in 1933. The next year, he joined St. Berchmans College, Changanassery but left the job in 1936, again due to differences with the college management to go back to his parallel colleges which he managed in places like Thrissur, Kottayam, Ernakulam and Thiruvananthapuram; noted Malayalam writer, Muttathu Varkey, was a teacher in one of these colleges. He had a second stint at St. Berchmans College during 1944–46 but moved to Thiruvananthapuram in 1950 to join Mar Ivanios College as a professor. In 1952, he also made an attempt to revive his parallel college in Kottayam which had stopped functioning.

Paul married Mary in 1926 and the couple had a daughter, Rosy Thomas, who went on to become a noted writer in her own right; C. J. Thomas, the playwright and critic, was his son-in-law. he died on July 12, 1952, at the age of 48, at Thiruvananthapuram, succumbing to illnesses contracted during one of his trips to Kottayam. The Church refused to allow him a catholic burial due to his constant confrontations with them and his mortal remains were buried at a public cemetery in Pattoor, Thiruvananthapuram.

== Legacy and honours ==
Without him there wouldn't have been any Basheer. The preface he wrote for Basheer's Balyakalasakhi was a striking one, said M. K. Sanu, about M. P. Paul, on the occasion of his 60th death anniversary.

Paul, who attempted to study aesthetics as fundamental to the practice of literary criticism and define the literary genres of novel, short story and essays, is credited with introducing a modern approach to literary criticism in Malayalam literature. He was known to be instrumental in democratising the renaissance movement in Malayalam literature for taking its benefits to the masses. Along with a group of literary enthusiasts, he founded Sahitya Pravarthaka Sahakarana Sangham, a cooperative society for helping the writers to publish their works as well as getting them a decent remuneration during a time when even established writers like Vaikom Muhammad Basheer struggled to get adequate remuneration; Paul was its founder president. He published a weekly Navakeralam and a monthly Cherupushpam and served as the president of the Kerala Purogamana Saahitya Sanghatana for a brief period before distancing himself from the organization due to differences of opinion. He was active in theatre, too, and, in 1937, founded the Shakespeare Theatre.

Paul introduced western literature to Malayalam and was the first critic in Malayalam literature to launch comparative literature which he attempted in his work, Novel Sahithyam where he exposed the similarities between Cymbeline and Kundalatha as well as Marthanda Varma and Ivanhoe. Cherukatha Prasthanam, another of his works, documented the traits of Malayalam short story when the genre was in its nascent stage. Kavya Darshanam, Khandakatha Prasthanam, Gadya Gathi, Sahithya Vicharam and Soundarya Nireekshanam are his other books on literary criticism. He also translated The Miser of Moliere into Malayalam under the title, Lubdhan. His work has been detailed in a biographical book, M. P. Paul -Kalapathinte Thiruseshippukal, written by George Onakkoor. Rosy Thomas, Paul's daughter, wrote a book, Urangunna Simham (The Sleeping Lion) on him, which is a compilation of her memories of her father.

M. P. Paul Charitable Trust, the eponymous charitable organization, has instituted M P Paul Award, an annual literary award for honouring literary excellence in Malayalam language studies and history. The award carries a prize of ₹25,000, a citation and a plaque. MP Paul award 2023 won by M Leelavathi.

== Bibliography ==
=== Essays ===
- Paul, M. P. (1930). Novel Sahithyam.
- Paul, M. P. (1932). Cherukatha Prastanam. Calicut: Poorna.
- Paul, M. P. (1953). Sahityavicharam. Kottayam: National Book Stall.
- Paul, M. P. (1954). Gadhyagathi. Sahithya Pravantaka Co: Sahithya Pravantaka Co. Archived from the original on 25 February 2019.
- Paul, M. P. (1972). Kavyadharshanam. S.P.C.S.
- Paul, M. P. (2012). Soundarya Nireekshanam. Kottayam: National Book Stall.
- Complete Works of M. P. Paul (1,500 pages 2 vols)

=== Translations ===
- Moliere (1953). Lubdan. Translated by M. P. Paul. Kottayam: SPCS.

=== Works on M. P. Paul ===
- Onakoor, Georage (1994). M. P. Paul - Kalapathinte Thiruseshippukal. DC Books. ASIN B007E4XNSG.
- M. Muraleedharan (2006). M. P. Paulinte Sahityavimarsanam. Vallathol Vidyapeedam.
- Rosy Thomas. Urangunna Simham.
