= Cheviyorkkuka! Anthimakahalam =

1992 book by Vaikom Muhammad Basheer

- Author: Vaikom Muhammad Basheer
- Language: Malayalam
- Genre: Speech
- Publisher: DC Books
- Publication date: 1992
- Publication place: India
- Pages: 50

Cheviyorkkuka! Anthimakahalam (Listen! The Last Trumpet) is a 1992 book by Vaikom Muhammad Basheer published in 1992. The book includes the speech given by Basheer on the occasion of being conferred the Doctor of Letters (D. Litt.) by University of Calicut on 19 January 1987. It was the last book of Basheer published during his lifetime.
