= Edayar =

- village
- Interactive map of Edayar
- Coordinates: 9.869°N 76.540°E
- Country: India
- State: Kerala
- District: Ernakulam

Languages
  - Official: Malayalam, English
- Time zone: UTC+5:30 (IST)
- PIN: 686662
- Telephone code: 91-(0)485
- Vehicle registration: KL-
- Website: www.ekm.kerala.gov.in

Edayar is a small village of Koothattukulam municipality in Ernakulam district and located at a distance of 6 km from Koothattukulam town and 8 km from Piravom in Kerala, India.

== Etymology ==
The name Edayar came from two words in Malayalam. "Eda" in Malayalam means in-between and "Aar" means a small river. A small stream which is part of a tributary to Periyar River is passing through this village. This water stream was the life line of this small village. The water from this stream was used for agriculture and all other domestic uses by the villagers.

The main occupation of the people is agriculture. Rubber, Coconut, vegetables, Pineapple and Paddy are the main crops cultivated in the village. Meat Products of India (MPI) is a public-sector unit in this village.

The village has a primary school (L.P.S. Edayar) which is run by the State Government of Kerala, and an upper primary school (Jawahar U.P.S.), under private ownership are the only educational institutions in the village. The villages depend on St. Johns High School, Vadakara and Govt. High School Namakuzhy situated at a distance of about 3 km from the village for their children's high school education. These two high schools uses both Malayalam and English as the medium of education. People are depend on nearby towns and cities for their higher education. Perhaps every house in the village can proudly say that there is at least one graduate in every family.

== Religion ==
The majority of the people consist of two communities namely Jacobite Syrian Christians and Ezhavas a prominent community of Hindus. St. Mary's Malankara Jacobite Syriac Orthodox Church, Kunnathu Mahadeva temple and Siva temple are situated in the village. St Mary's Church has celebrated its 100th anniversary in 2008. This church was built in 1908 and its architecture based on traditional Thach Sastra.

St. Mary's Jacobite Syrian Church, Edayar

== Geography ==
The central areas of this village are Kaniyalippady, Pallippaday, Peedikappady, Uzhalakkadu and Kollanpady. This is because of the main road connecting to the nearby two towns Koothattukulam and Piravom, is passing through these regions. Among these, the oldest and famous one is Pallippaday. "Uzhavoor thodu" is crossing the main road here and this stream is the basic root of the name of this village. Milma (Kerala Co-operative Milk Marketing Federation KCMMF), Rubber Marketing Society (State Co-operative Rubber Marketing Federation Limited.), St. Mary's Jacobite Syrian Church, Sree Narayana Guru Temple (SNDP temple), and both schools are situated here. Geographically upper placed Peedikappady is having the Post office, Library, Mahadeva and Siva temples. Uzhalakkadu, a fast-growing area of Edayar with the support of Meat Products of India (MPI) which is a Kerala Government owned company. There are many other commercial establishments and a small clinic. EFANS Club is the cultural corner here with many entertainment activities for youths. The club offered and started by the merchant association of Uzhalakkadu in 1980(?). "Chathayam Naal" (the last day of Onam) and anniversaries of the club are celebrated with many cultural events.

== Grameena Vayanasala ==
Edayar Grameena Vayanasala, is one of the "Grade A" public libraries in Kerala and the heart of the village. It is affiliated to Kerala State Library Council and has a collection of more than 14,246 books on various subjects. It was established earlier in 1924 as "Martha Mariyam Vayanasala" in St. Mary's Jacobite Church with a good collection of books and opened for public. After a few years, with the support of the people in Edayar, library owned about half acres of land in Peedikappady and constructed a new building with memorial hall, reading and circulation rooms and an independent office. A vast play ground with an open-air auditorium served several cultural events happened through many years in this village.

Apart from revenues from members, the library receives a government grant from the Kerala State Government. It includes a good amount for purchasing new books and other library activities. Library also gets grants from the local panchayat and different government sources. Around 500 new books are adding every year to the existing collection.

Library organise a Nursery School, and Vayomithram center for the public. Various programs sponsored by the local and government agencies are also host and held here.

The major event celebrate here is Thiruvonam. On this day library organise different cultural programs and celebrate Onam with the entire people in Edayar. The library has an Administration Committee of ten members for a period of two years(?), elected by the library members. Election procedures are similar to Indian election method and the candidates are among the library members, may be from different political groups. Youngsters of Edayar are active in the election and do the administration of library.

In 2001 the library celebrated its platinum Jubilee and opened a Platinum Jubilee Mandiram as a new recreation building.

== Politics ==
The major political parties in this village are United Democratic Front (UDF—led by the Indian National Congress), Left Democratic Front (LDF—led by the Communist Party of India (CPI), Communist Party of India (Marxist) (CPI (M)) and Bharatiya Janata Party (BJP).

== See also ==
- Edayar Photo Gallery
