= Anuragathinte Dinangal =

Book by Vaikom Muhammad Basheer

- Author: Vaikom Muhammad Basheer
- Publication date: 2019
- ISBN: 978-8171301331

Anuragathinte Dinangal (The Days of Intimacy) is a Malayalam language book by Vaikom Muhammad Basheer published in 1983. The author himself has traced Anuragathinte Dinangal to the diary he had kept of a Hindu girl's love for him frustrated by the objection from her parents and Basheer's refusal to hurt them. The book was originally titled Kaamukante Diary (The Diary of the Paramour) but was changed later on the suggestion of the author M. T. Vasudevan Nair.
