= Vishwavikhyathamaya Mookku =

- Short story by Vaikom Muhammad Basheer
- Country: India
- Language: Malayalam
- Genre: Satire

Publication
- Published in: Vishwavikhyathamaya Mookku
- Publisher: S.P.C.S.
- Publication date: 1954

"Vishwavikhyathamaya Mookku" (The World-Renowned Nose) is a Malayalam-language short story written by Vaikom Muhammad Basheer and published in 1954 in an anthology of the same name. The story is regarded as a classic in Malayalam literature.

== Plot summary ==
The story is a socio-political satire about an illiterate cook whose nose starts to grow from the day he turns 24. The nose grows like an elephant's trunk. The poor cook becomes rich in no time and starts to give opinions on national and international matters. The story expands on the complications arising from the long nose of the ordinary man. By using this simple topic, the nose, Basheer is exposing the social conduct through comedy.

== Publication ==
"Vishwavikhyathamaya Mookku" was published as a book in 1954 by S.P.C.S. in an anthology by the same name. The following stories are included in this collection:

- "Vishwavikhyathamaya Mookku"
- "Neethinyayam"
- "Pazhaya Oru Kochu Premakatha"

== Translations ==
- K. M. Sheriff (1994). "The World Famous Nose" (PDF). Indian Literature. Vol. 37, no. 164. New Delhi: Sahitya Akademi. JSTOR 44295659.
- V. Abdullah (2008). "The World Renowned Nose". In Subashree Krishnaswamy; K. Srilata (eds.). Short Fiction from South India: Kannada, Malayalam, Tamil and Telugu. New Delhi: Oxford University Press. pp. 49–57. ISBN 978-0-19-569246-4.
