= Rosy Thomas =

Indian writer

Rosy Thomas (1927–2009) was an Indian writer of Malayalam literature.

== Biography ==
She was born in 1927 in Kerala. She was the daughter of Mary Paul and literary critic M. P. Paul. She married Malayalam playwright and literary critic C. J. Thomas, but was widowed at the age of 31. Her best known work is a memoir on her husband C. J. Thomas, Ivan Ente Priya C. J. She died on 6 December 2009.

== Selected works ==
- Ivan ente priya C. J. (Biography)
- Urangunna Simham (Memoir on M. P. Paul)
- Annie (Novel)
- Jalakakkazhcha (Essays)
- Malavellam
- Amerikkayil oru malayalippennu (Travelogue)

=== Translations ===
- Boccaccio
- Animal Farm
- So Many Hungers
