= Premalekhanam =

Story by Vaikom Muhammed Basheer

- Author: Vaikom Muhammad Basheer
- Publication date: 1943

Premalekhanam (The Love Letter) is the first of Vaikom Muhammad Basheer's works (1943) to be published as a book. The novel is a humorous story of love. Through the hilarious dialogs, Basheer attacks religious Conservatism and the dowry system.

== Plot summary ==
A young bank employee, Keshavan Nair, Hindu by religion, Nair by caste lodges on the upper floor of the house belonging to Saramma's father. Saraamma is a Christian by religion, beautiful, young, unmarried, unemployed, happy-go-lucky with a sting on the tip of her tongue. Keshavan Nair is an honest simpleton hopelessly in love with her. The book gets its title from the letter that Keshavan Nair composes to reveal to Saramma his love for her. The setting is 1940s Kerala. The story is a sarcastic commentary on the dowry system and is in favour of inter-religious marriage. But this is disguised in a funny love story. Basheer was not a Nair or a Christian, he was a lover of humanity. Saramma is an educated woman, and she is trying to get a job, and she has applied for jobs in many countries( because the story is set in Travancore, which was a country, or princely state). At last she gets a job. The job provider was Keshavan Nair, and the only job assigned to Saramma was to love him!He pays for that too in a monthly basis.

Now the serious questions arise. They belong to different religions, then which religion will their children follow? They decide to teach their children every religion and it is up to the children to choose their religion. They plan to grow their children "Religion less". Then comes the other serious issue, How will they name the child? They cannot choose a Hindu name or Christian name, Keshavan Nair asks "Shall we go for Russian names?"Saramma asks "How will it be?" "Anything ending with 'Visky'is a Russian name" Saramma was not happy with it. Keshavan Nair asks "Shall we go for Chinese names like Kwang" Saramma is still not happy. Finally they decides to go with names over objects like sky, sand, Air, toffee, balloon. They finally decide to take a lot of these objects, The result of the lot will be two chits which say "Sky" and "Toffee". They name their child as "Skytoffee". Keshavan Nair shouts saying "Mr.Skytoffee","Skytoffee","Comrade:Skytoffee". Saramma interrupts "Do you want our child to become a communist" Keshavan Nair says "Let him decide on that".

The story ends happily.

== Writing and publication ==
Premalekhanam was written in 1943 when Basheer was under imprisonment at Thiruvananthapuram Central Jail, Poojappura as a political prisoner on charges of raajadroham (treason), for writing articles against Dewan C. P. Ramaswami Iyer.

Basheer mentions the writing of Premalekhanam in his later work Mathilukal. The love-story that forms the plot of Mathilukal happened during the same prison term. At jail, he wrote many stories to entertain fellow prisoners, especially people sentenced for life. But at the time of leaving prison, the only work that he could get hold of was Premalekhanam. (Some of the other stories he later rewrote from memory). After his release, he got Premalekhanam published in 1943. By 1944, the book was banned in Thiruvithankoor, although there was nothing political in it. The main reason for banning this book in Travancore is that, Travancore was a Hindu country(princely state)where interreligious and intercaste marriages were strictly opposed, and the book indirectly favoured interreligious marriages.

== Film adaptation ==
P. A. Backer adapted the novel for his film of the same name in 1985. The cast includes Soman (Kesavan Nair), Swapna (Saramma Thomas), Meena (Aliyama), Captain Raju (Babu), Vincent (Joykutty) and Mala Aravindan (Kunchan).
