= Visappu =

1954 short story collection by Vaikom Muhammad Basheer

Visappu (Hunger) is a collection of Malayalam short stories by Vaikom Muhammad Basheer published in 1954. The collection includes Basheer's first story "Ente Thankam" (My Darling) which is titled "Thankam" in the book. This story originally appeared in the Ernakulam-based newspaper Jayakesari in 1937. The other stories include "Visappu" (Hunger), "Marunnu" (Medicine) and "Pishachu" (Devil). Visappu is considered a modern classic in south Asian literature.

== List of stories ==
1. "Thankam"
2. "Shashinas"
3. "Hridayanatha"
4. "Marunnu"
5. "Nammude Hridayangal"
6. "Pishachu"
7. "Visappu"
