= Anargha Nimisham =

Collection of short stories by Vaikom Basheer

Anargha Nimisham (Invaluable Moment) is a collection of short stories in Malyalam by Vaikom Muhammad Basheer published in 1946. Unlike other works by Basheer which are filled with humour and satire, stories of Anargha Nimisham mostly deal with philosophical and spiritual aspects.

== List of stories ==
- "Anargha Nimisham"
- "Jeevitham"
- "Mangalaashamsakal"
- "Sandhyapranamam"
- "Yuddham Avasanikkanamenkil"
- "Vishudharomam"
- "Poonilavil"
- "Anal Haq"
- "Ekanthathayude Mahatheeram"
- "Ajnathamaya Bhaviyilekk"

== See also ==
- Anal Haq
