= Mary John Koothattukulam =

Indian writer of Malayalam literature

- Born: Mary John Koothattukulam; 22 January 1905; Koothattukulam, Kerala, India
- Died: 2 December 1998 (aged 93)
- Occupation: Poet
- Writing career
- Language: Malayalam
- Notable awards: Kerala Sahitya Akademi Award for Overall Contributions

Mary John Koothattukulam (22 January 1905 – 2 December 1998) was a Malayalam language poet from Kerala, India. In 1996, she was honoured with the Kerala Sahitya Akademi Award for Overall Contributions.

== Biography ==
Mary was born as the daughter of a priest Chorepiscopus Chollampel Yohannan and Annamma. She studied at St. John's Syrian Higher Secondary School, Vadakara. She was the older sister of the playwright and critic, C. J. Thomas. When forced to marry a person she did not like, Mary left her house and took refuge with the social reformer Dr. Palpu. From there, she studied and passed the Vidwan course and became a teacher. Later, she quit the job as a teacher and joined Travancore postal service. She was motivated by the high salary in the postal department at that time compared to the teaching job. Her unhealthiness also forced her to quit the job as teacher. After retiring from the postal service in 1960, she lived with her sister and family in a house at Trivandrum. Mary's notable works include Prabhatapushpam, Bhaspamanikal, Antinakshatram, Poojapushpam, Ammayum Makalum and Chirikkunna Kattar. Apart from this, her poems have been published in various periodicals and annuals. In 1996, Kerala Sahitya Akademi honoured her with the overall contribution award.
