= Manthrikappoocha =

Manthrikappoocha (The Magic Cat) is a Malyalam-language short novel by Vaikom Muhammad Basheer published in 1968. It is one of the most famous among Basheer's works. The novel revolves around a cat that often ventures out into Basheer's house. The narration of the story is filled with pleasant humour and anecdotes from Muslim and Hindu religious lore.
