= Ormayude Arakal =

Book by Vaikom Muhammad Basheer

- Author: Vaikom Muhammad Basheer
- Language: Malayalam
- Genre: Memoirs
- Publisher: National Book Stall
- Publication date: 1973
- Publication place: India

Ormayude Arakal (Chambers of memory) is a collection of memoirs by Vaikom Muhammad Basheer originally serialised in Chandrika Weekly and published as a book by National Book Stall in 1973. It is a rambling, incomplete kind of autobiography by the noted Malayalam author. The book also includes Basheer's conversations with Sreedharan, B. M. Gafoor, P. K. Muhammad, M. A. Hakim, K. K. Amu, I. V. Sasi, and Punalur Rajan.
