= Mucheettukalikkarante Makal =

Book by Vaikom Muhammad Basheer

Mucheettukalikkarante Makal (The Card Sharper's Daughter) is a novel by Vaikom Muhammad Basheer published in 1951. Written in the colloquial tongue and filled with exceptional humour, the novel remains a best seller in Malayalam literature.

== Plot summary ==
Ottakkannan Pokker barely ekes out a living as a card sharper. His daughter Zainaba runs a small tea shop in the marketplace. She falls in love with Mandan Muthappa. Pokker objects this relationship because he hoped for a better son-in-law. The story develops with love between Zainaba and Mandan Muthappa and ends with how Mandan Muthappa defeats Ottakkannan Pokker in a card game.
