= Dharmarajyam =

Collection of essays by Vaikom Muhammad Basheer

- Author: Vaikom Muhammad Basheer
- Language: Malayalam
- Genre: Essays
- Publisher: DC Books
- Publication date: 1938
- Publication place: India
- Pages: 100
- ISBN: 978-81-264-1833-6

Dharmarajyam is a collection of essays written by Malayalam language writer Vaikom Muhammad Basheer. These politically charged essays were written against the policies of the then Diwan of Travancore Sir C. P. Ramaswami Iyer. The book was published in 1938 and was Basheer's first published book. The book was banned by the Travancore government the same year. It is said that Basheer himself got these printed and sold them at local shops, going house to house on foot. Subsequently, he was jailed for two years for conspiring against the government. The book was re-released by DC Books in 2008.
