= Viddikalude Swargam =

1948 short story collection by Vaikom Muhammad Basheer

- Author: Vaikom Muhammad Basheer
- Original title: വിഡ്ഢികളുടെ സ്വർഗം
- Cover artist: Artist Namboothiri
- Language: Malayalam
- Publisher: D. C. Books
- Publication date: 1948
- Publication place: India
- Pages: 71
- ISBN: 81-7130-490-7

Viddikalude Swargam (Fool's Paradise) is a Malayalam short story collection by Vaikom Muhammad Basheer published in 1948. The book is one of the best acknowledged works of Basheer and is considered a modern Malayalam classic.

== List of stories ==
1. "Viddikalude Swargam"
2. "Poovan Pazham"
3. "Nilavu Kaanumpol"
4. "Aadyathe Chumbanam"
5. "Kaalpadu"
6. "Ozhinha Veedu"

== Adaptation ==
Poovan Pazham from the collection was adapted into a telefilm of the same name by P. Balachandran.
