= Maranathinte Nizhalil =

1951 novel by Vaikom Muhammad Basheer

- Author: Vaikom Muhammad Basheer
- Language: Malayalam
- Genre: Novel
- Publisher: DC Books
- Publication date: 1951
- Publication place: India

Maranathinte Nizhalil (In the Shadow of Death) is a Malayalam-language novel by Vaikom Muhammad Basheer published in 1951. In this novel, Basheer has not followed his usual style of humour and sarcasm. It is an isolated work because of the subjective presentation of some of the hard experiences of its hero, and its technique resembles more or less the 'stream of consciousness' method.
