= Kathabeejam =

1945 play by Vaikom Muhammad Basheer

- Author: Vaikom Muhammad Basheer
- Language: Malayalam
- Genre: Play
- Publisher: DC Books
- Publication date: May 1945
- Publication place: India
- Pages: 76
- OCLC: 311460123

Kathabeejam (The Germ of a Story) is a one-act play written by Malayalam language author Vaikom Muhammad Basheer. The play was written by Basheer for the 16th anniversary of Samastha Kerala Sahitya Parishath. It was published as a book in May 1945 and remains Basheer's only play. The protagonist of the play is a writer named Sadasivan.
