= Pramod Payyannur =

Indian theater director

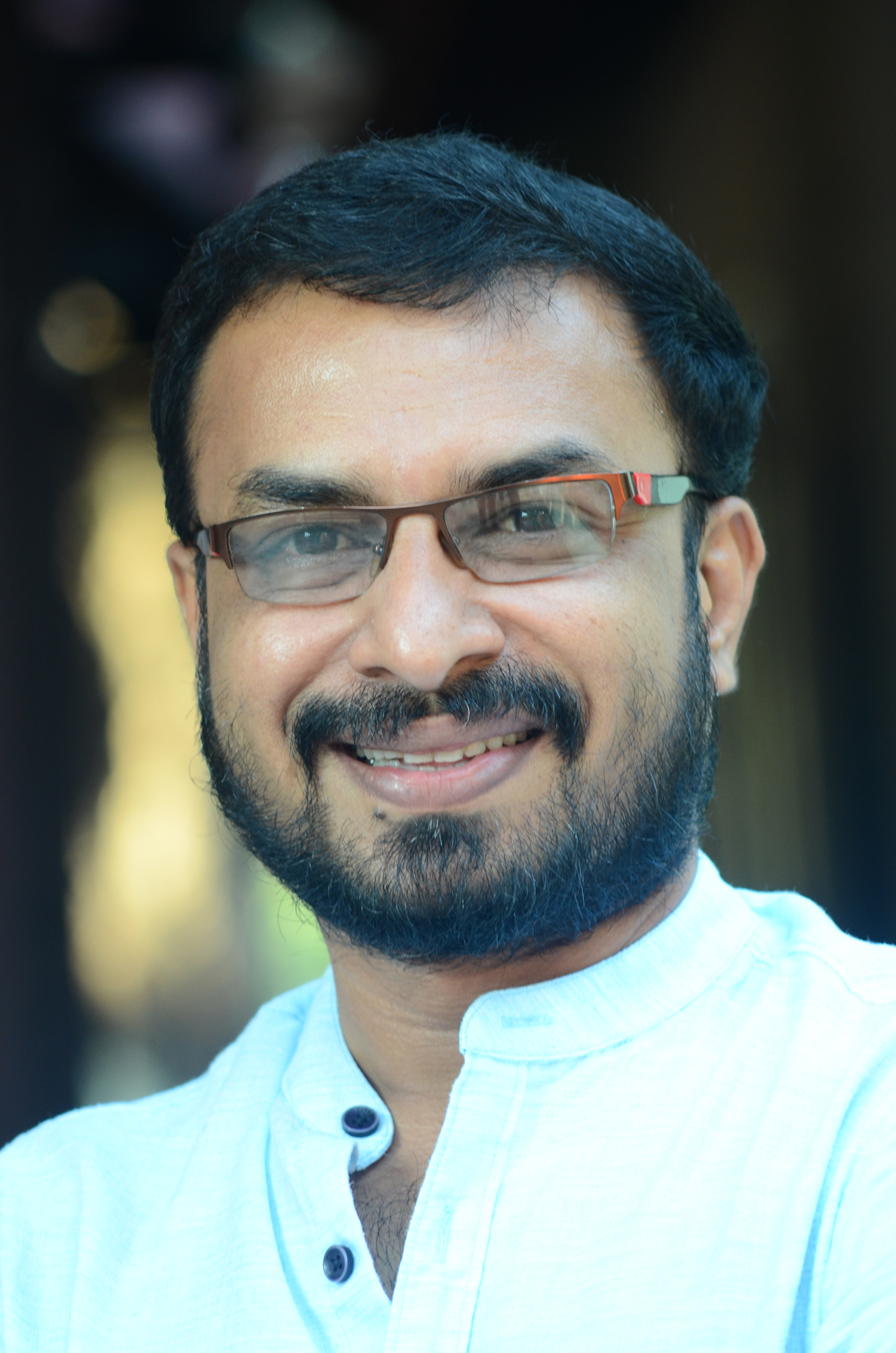
- Pramod Payyannur
- Born: 17 May 1971; Bengaluru
- Occupations: Playwright, Theatre Director, Movie Director, Lyricist,

Pramod Payyannur is an Indian director and writer who works in Malayalam theater. He has directed the film Balayakala Sakhi based on Vaikom Mohammad Basheer's novel Balyakalasakhi, which acted by Mammootty, Isha Talwar, Seema Biswas, Meena, KPAC Lalitha and Mamukkoya. Pramod was the writer of Vishwaguru, the film was recorded in Guinness World Records as the fastest film produced. The film was scripted, created, and released in 51 hours and two minutes. He is currently working as the Member Secretary of Bharat Bhavan Kerala, an official cultural exchange centre for Kerala Government, Thiruvananthapuram, Kerala.

== Education ==
Pramod Payyannur has a Bachelor's degree with the First Rank in Direction from the School of Drama and Fine Arts and a Masters in Professional Arts from Pondicherry University.

== Filmography ==
- Balyakalasakhi (2014)
