= Ana Al-Haqq =

Short story based on the life of the Sufi Mansur Al-Hallaj

Ana Al-Haqq (Arabic: أنا الحَق) is a short story based on the life of the Sufi Mansur Al-Hallaj, who was indicted and killed on charges of heresy. It is part of the short story anthology Anargha Nimisham, written by Vaikom Muhammad Basheer in typical Khalil Gibran style.

The title "Ana Al-Haqq", is a famous saying of al-Hallaj and means "I am the Truth".

== Plot ==
Husayn bin Mansoor [sic] Al-Hallaj was condemned to hang by the neck for shouting in ecstasy Anā al-Ḥaqq, Anā al-Ḥaqq (I am the Truth, I am the Truth). The orthodox understood this to mean that he was claiming to be God himself, whereas he had proclaimed, in his sublime spiritual ecstasy, simply a total annihilation of himself. Mansoor Al-Hallaj climbed the gallows with his head held high, not the least daunted by his imminent death. Nor could his shouts be drowned in the tumult of abuses which were hurled at him; they rose loud and clear and high Anā al-Ḥaqq, Anā al-Ḥaqq until his soul departed to the fountainhead of his life on high.

== Remarks ==
Basheer draws a parallel between "Ana al-Haqq" and Aham Brahmasmi the Upanishad Mahāvākya which means I am Brahman (the Ultimate Reality in Hinduism). Basheer uses this term to intend God is found within one's 'self'. The story is written in such a way as to attack the orthodox practices in Islam.

In the edition of Anargha Nimisham which was published in 1982, Basheer added a note saying that "This story was written some forty years back. Now, I believe that ordinary human beings who are just the products of the All Mighty saying things like "I am God" is a sin. I had also claimed that the work is based on a real story, but now; take it just as a fantasy". This is considered as a marked change from his earlier convictions. Critics contended that Basheer had become more religious towards his later life, contradicting some of his earlier works. He did not leave even this note without a touch of humour; this note too ended with Anā al-Ḥaqq, similar to that of the protagonist of the story.
