= Pathummayude Aadu =

1959 novel by Vaikom Muhammad Basheer

Pathumma's Goat
- First Edition Cover
- Author: Vaikom Muhammad Basheer
- Original title: Pathummayude Aadu
- Language: Malayalam
- Genre: Comic novel
- Publisher: DC Books
- Publication date: April 1959
- Publication place: India
- ISBN: 978-8171302093

Pathumma's Goat (original title: Pathummayude Aadu) is a 1959 Malayalam novel by Vaikom Muhammad Basheer. The characters of the novel are members of his family and the action takes place at his home in Thalayolaparambu. The goat in the story belongs to his sister Pathumma. Basheer begins the novel with an alternative title for the book, Pennungalude Buddhi (The Wisdom of Women).

== Plot ==
Ever since Basheer first left home to participate in the salt satyagraha at Kozhikode, he had led a wanderer's life; Ottaanthadi, muchaanvayaru. Only occasionally did he return to his home at Thalayolapparambu, with the intention of penning down his thoughts in interludes of tranquility. Next to the house where he grew up, in the same compound, he had a walled-in plot with a small house. He built this retreat himself, and around the house he planted a garden. This gate was always closed, as he required silence and peace of mind. He would sit and write or walk around his garden tending to his beloved plants.

On returning from one of his travels, he was forced to live in the house where his large family lived, instead of in his private home. This household was always filled with noise and chaos; no place for a writer. The inhabitants were Basheer's mother, his younger siblings and their families. Add to this, there were myriads of domestic animals who treated the house as their own.

Basheer's sister Pathumma, who lived in a shack a little distance away, would visit the house every day with her daughter Khadeeja and with them would come Pathumma's goat. This goat had absolute freedom in the house. It would eat up anything it could, from fallen leaves before someone came to sweep them, Chaambaykka fruits (Water Apple) from the lower branches of the tree Basheer planted, trousers worn by Basheer's nephew Abi, grass specially gathered for it, food set away for it, even food meant for human inhabitants of the house, to the author's copy of newest editions of Basheer's Baalyakaalasakhi, Shabdangal and Vishwavikhyaadamaaya Mookku, fresh out of press.

When Basheer arrived home, each family member approached him with requests for financial assistance. When Basheer gives money to his mother, the next day his younger brother Abdul Khadar would take it all from her. When he gives anything to any of his nephews or nieces, other people of the family ask why he doesn't give stuff to their children. His money runs out within a few days of his arrival. He gets down to disciplining the noisy children of the house. His youngest brother, Abu terrorises the household, the children, women and animals.

Basheer's immediate younger brother, Abdul Khadar was the head of the family, since Basheer was away most of the time and did not have a permanent source of income. At times the author would return home with a small fortune after publishing one of his books, then people of the family and the village would approach him with supplications. Abdul Khadar was handicapped in one leg. When Basheer and he were young, he used to beat up Basheer and make him carry his books to school. His handicap got him special privileges from everyone. Once when Basheer's tolerance was pushed to the limits, he beat up his younger brother, and since then Abdul Khadar began giving him due respect. In their childhood, Basheer often had to bear the punishment when actually Abdul Khadar was the real culprit.

While Basheer wandered from place to place, Abdul Khadar got himself a job and looked after the family. First he worked as a school master, then quit the job and took various other employments. At the time when he became a schoolmaster, Basheer was serving three months prison term in Kannur prison after getting arrested at Kozhikode on his way to participate in Salt Satyagraham (1930). In 1936–37, he was residing at Ernakulam, writing for various magazines essentially for free. That was the time when he lived in near poverty, struggling to get to eat one square meal a day, having to borrow from everyone even to manage a cup of tea. He wrote prolifically, for newspapers and periodicals, but he got paid next to nothing for his efforts. This was the period which forms the backdrop in which works like Janmadinam were set.

Once during this period, Abdul Khadar visited Basheer. The older brother proudly gave him his literary works to read. Abdul Khadar, instead of admiring his brother's literary genius found fault with the grammar and language usage. Avante oru lodukkoos akhya... Ithu njaan varthamaanam parayunnathupole ezhuthivachirikkayaanu. Avante chattukaalan akhyaadam. Palunkoosan vyakaranam, Basheer retorts. Years later, with the publication of major works like Baalyakaalasakhi (1944), Basheer's name became recognised throughout Kerala. Then Abdul Khadar no longer complained of grammatical errors in his brother's sentences, instead asked him for copies of the book so that he could make money selling them. He even asked Basheer to write about members of the family and gave him ideas for plots of stories.

== Writing and publication ==
Pathummayude Aadu is the only major Basheer work that was published without any revisions from the original manuscript. It was written in 1954 during Basheer's first period of insanity, when he was institutionalised at a mental Sanatorium at Thrissur. He meant to revise and edit the manuscript further, but did nothing for five years. Later, he felt that any revision was unnecessary. Between the writing (1954) and publication (1959) Basheer married Fabi. In this novel Basheer states that he is not writing it in lyrical language but in slang (speaking language).

The novel was first published serially in Gopuram, a bimonthly published from Trivandrum under the editorship of N. Damodaran.
