= Ente Thankam =

Short story

"' Thankam" (My Darling) is a short story written by Vaikom Muhammad Basheer. It is his first published work. Originally published in the now-defunct newspaper Jayakesari in 1937, it was later published in the collection Vishappu (Hunger, 1954, Current Books) under the name "Thankam". A path-breaker in Malayalam romantic fiction, it had as its heroine a dark-complexioned hunchback.

== Background ==
After doing menial jobs in cities such as Ajmer, Peshawar, Kashmir and Calcutta, Basheer returned to Ernakulam some time in the mid-1930s. While trying his hand at various jobs, like washing vessels in hotels, he met a manufacturer of sports goods from Sialkot who offered him an agency in Kerala. And Basheer finally returned home to find his father's business bankrupt and the family impoverished. He started working as an agent for the Sialkot sports company at Ernakulam. But he lost the agency when a bicycle accident incapacitated him temporarily. On recovering, he resumed his endless hunt for jobs. He walked into the office of the newspaper Jayakesari whose editor was also its sole employee. He did not have a position to offer, but offered to pay money if Basheer wrote a story for the paper. Thus Basheer found himself writing stories for Jayakesari and it was in this paper that "Ente Thankam" (My Darling) was published in the year 1937.
