= Balyakalasakhi (2014 film) =

- Official poster
- Directed by: Pramod Payyannur
- Screenplay by: Pramod Payyannur
- Based on: Balyakalasakhi by Vaikom Muhammad Basheer
- Produced by: MB Muhsin; Sajeeb Hashim
- Starring: Mammootty; Isha Talwar; Meena; Seema Biswas; KPAC Lalitha; Mamukkoya
- Cinematography: Hari Nair
- Edited by: Manoj Kannoth
- Music by: Songs: K. Raghavan; Shahabaz Aman; Score: Bijibal
- Production companies: Red Cinema; Livinart Film Factory
- Release date: 7 February 2014 (Kerala)
- Country: India
- Language: Malayalam

Balyakalasakhi (transl. Childhood Companion) is a 2014 Malayalam language film adaptation of the famous novel of the same name by Vaikom Muhammad Basheer. The romantic musical drama film was written and directed by debutant Pramod Payyannur and stars Mammootty, Isha Talwar, Meena, Seema Biswas, KPAC Lalitha and Mamukkoya in lead roles.

The story revolves around childhood sweethearts Majeed (Mammootty) and Suhra (Isha Talwar). Born to rich parents, Majeed falls in love with his not-so-affluent neighbour Suhra. After her father's death, when Suhra struggles to make both ends meet, Majeed pleads with his father to sponsor her education. Refused, he wanders off to distant lands. Some of the other characters created by Basheer such as Ettukali Mammoonju and Ottakannan Pokker also appear in the film.

The film has lyrics and music created by several leading masters including P. Bhaskaran, K. Raghavan, K. T. Muhammed, O. N. V. Kurup, Kavalam Narayana Panicker, Sreekumaran Thampi, and Basheer himself. The launch of the film edition of the novel Balyakalasakhi was done by Leela Menon who handed over the book to Fabi Basheer, wife of Vaikom Muhammed Basheer.

== Cast ==
- Mammootty In Dual Roles
  - Majeed
    - Shane Nigam as Teenage Majeed
      - Gouri Shankar as young Majeed
  - Majeed's Father
- Isha Talwar as Suhara
  - Saniya Iyappan as Teenage Suhara
    - Nidhi as younger Suhara
- Meena as Majeed's Mother
- Seema Biswas as Selvi
- Tanushree Ghosh as Shabnam
- Sunil Sukhada as Avuran
- Sashi Kumar as Ameen Sahib
- Mamukkoya as Narayanan Master
- Priam Shaikh as Praful
- Kavitha Nair as Suhara's Mother
- Prakash Bare as Beeran, Suhara's father
- Parambrata Chatterjee
- Shari
- KPAC Lalitha
- Nayana Josan as Suhara (childhood)
- GK as Beeran
- Nilambur Ayisha as Jinnumma
- Moly Kannamaly as Kadathukari Kunjali
- Aneesh G Menon as Thoma
- Binny Tom as Avuran's wife

== Production ==
Pramod Payyannur, a familiar name in Malayalam theatre and television, made his debut on the big screen with the film. Mammootty was chosen to play the lead in film by Pramod Payyannur. He said in an interview with Malayala Manorama, "Vaikom is the home of the writer Basheer, the character Majeed and also the actor Mammootty. Only a person who knew that place closely could imbibe that character in both looks and expressions. That search ended in Mammootty."

On being quizzed about the inspiration to choose Kolkata as the location of the film, when Vaikom Muhammed Basheer has not referred to any specific city in the novel, Pramod says that Kolkata is perhaps the only Indian metro that still retains its old world charm and that it perfectly matched the setting of the film's backdrop. Besides, Basheer is believed to have written Balyakalasakhi during his brief stay at a house in Lower Chitpur Road in Kolkata, he explains.

Two seasons were shot in Kerala and Kolkata, West Bengal. The team began shooting in August, 2013 at Perumbalam near Vaikom. Mammootty began filming for Balyakalasakhi at Kolkata in October, 2013. The 18-day schedule included various places such as Victoria Memorial, Chhote Lal Ghat, in front of Town Hall.

== Reception ==
Metromatinee.com said "even if it has some limits, it is a timeless and exciting classic, Mammootty as lovelorn Majeed is impressive but a lack of good chemistry with Isha Talwar is a letdown". Deccan Chronicle said that Mammootty excelled in the double role as Majeed and as Majeed's father.

== Soundtrack ==
The film has lyrics and music composed by several leading masters in the field while the background score was composed by Bijibal. The first line of the song "Thaamara Poonkaavanathil Thaamasikkunnoley" has been mentioned in the novel by Basheer himself. An oral traditional song of the Muslims in Kerala, the song's lines were supplemented with lyrics penned by K. T. Muhammed. It has been sung by legendary singer K. J. Yesudas. "Kaalam Parakkanu", the second song composed by Raghavan Master, which has Pramod's lyrics, has been sung by Raghavan Master's disciple V. T. Murali. P. Bhaskaran's poem "Ente Thoolika" has been adapted for a song composed on the lines of Rabindra Sangeet. It is the title song and has a mix of Urdu lyrics and Baul music too. It has been sung by Shahabaz Aman. The entire song signifies a journey. The Urdu portion has been sung by Ustad Faiyaz Khan. Sreekumaran Thampi's lyrics for the film has been sung by K. S. Chithra and Vijay Yesudas as a duet while O. N. V. Kurup's poem "Vaaghdatta Bhoomi" has been translated into Bengali and sung by Bengali singer Raghav Chatterjee. Kavalam Narayana Panikkar has composed a song in the folk music tradition that makes use of Basheer's idioms and words. It has been sung by Shahabaz.

Mammootty officially launched the music on 6 January 2014 by handing over the CD to late music director Raghavan Master's family. The soundtrack consists of six songs and four karaoke versions.

Track listing
| No. | Title | Lyrics | Music | Singer(s) | Length |
|---|---|---|---|---|---|
| 1. | "Aa nammalu kandillenna" | Kavalam Narayana Panicker | Shahabaz Aman | Shahabaz Aman; Pushpavathy Poypadathu |
| 2. | "Kaalam parakkana" | Pramod Payyannur | K. Raghavan | V. T. Murali |
| 3. | "Kothai Sesha Bhoomi" | O. N. V. Kurup; Venu Kolkatha | Shahabaz Aman | Raghab Chatterjee |
| 4. | "Povukayanu Njan" | P. Bhaskaran | Shahabaz Aman | Shahabaz Aman; Ustad Faiyaz Khan |
| 5. | "Thamarappoonkavanathil" | K. T. Muhammed | K. Raghavan | K. J. Yesudas |
| 6. | "Veendum thalir podinjuvo" | Sreekumaran Thampi | Shahabaz Aman | Vijay Yesudas; K. S. Chithra |
