= Parallel college =

A parallel college was a privately owned educational institution in Kerala (a state of India) that was neither affiliated with nor recognized by any university, but that offered unofficial training following the courseware of a university. This system worked, in that most of the universities in Kerala allowed "private registration", in which a student could register in a university for a course, then pursue an academic programme without being admitted to a college or a university department. Students could learn the course material by themselves, then appear for examination at the university. Such students who pursued a 'private study' often relied on parallel colleges for tuition and guidance. The system was popular in Kerala because the total intake capacity of the affiliated colleges were insufficient to accommodate the aspirants for higher (tertiary) education.

Parallel colleges were always small-scale institutions with very limited facilities. They offered training only in 'arts' (social sciences and literature) or 'commerce' faculties (BA, B.Com, MA, M.Com) and never in 'science' or 'technical' faculties. This was because science courses required lab facilities.

== Demise ==
Parallel colleges were very popular and were, in fact, centres of education for the masses in the 1970s through 1990s. They were also a source of employment for many. But by the end of the 2000s this system has come to an end, following the state's opening of the higher education sector to private investors, which caused a surge in the number of private engineering colleges and other privately owned professional colleges, thus leaving many of the conventional (affiliated) degree colleges under-populated, eliminating the reason for the parallel system.

== Tutorial colleges ==
Tutorial colleges are institutions similar to parallel colleges with more limited scope. While parallel colleges impart full training to its students, tutorial colleges merely supplement the lessons given by colleges or schools.
