= Koothattukulam =

Municipality in Kerala, India

- Municipality
- Location in Kerala, India Koothattukulam (India)
- Coordinates: 9.8648°N 76.5956°E
- Country: India
- State: Kerala
- District: Ernakulam
- Taluk: Muvattupuzha

Area
  - Total: 23.18 km^{2} (8.95 sq mi)

Population (2011)
  - Total: 17,253
  - Density: 744.3/km^{2} (1,928/sq mi)

Languages
  - Official: Malayalam, English
- Time zone: UTC+5:30 (IST)
- PIN: 686662
- Telephone code: 0485
- ISO 3166 code: IN-KL
- Vehicle registration: KL-17
- Nearest city: Muvattupuzha, Thodupuzha
- Assembly constituency: Piravom
- Lok Sabha constituency: Kottayam
- Website: https://koothatukulammunicipality.lsgkerala.gov.in/en/

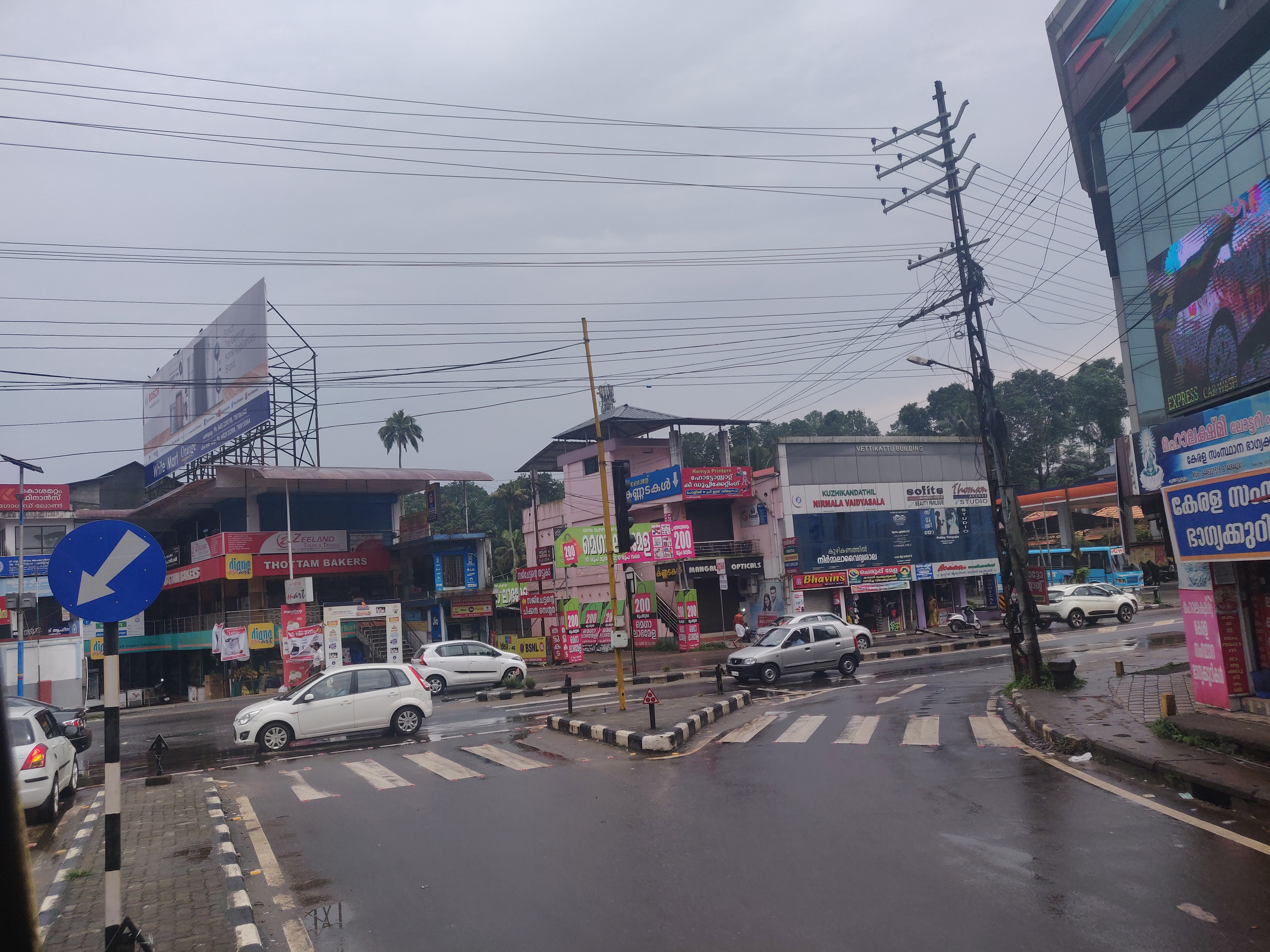
Koothattukulam Junction

Koothattukulam is a municipality of Kerala state, India in the Ernakulam district. It is 40 km (24.9 mi) south east of the Ernakulam district headquarters (Kakkanad) and about 190 km (118.1 mi) north of the state capital Thiruvananthapuram. As per the 2011 census of India, Koothattukulam has a population of 17,253 people, and a population density of 755/km^{2} (1,960/sq mi). It is at the junction of Ernakulam, Kottayam, and Idukki districts, in the foothills of the Western Ghats and is part of the Keezhmalanad region.

The town comprises five main localities: Koothattukulam, Vadakara, Paittakulam, Kizhakombu and Edayar.

== Notable people ==
- Mary John Koothattukulam, Malayalam language poet
- C. J. Thomas (1918–1960), an Indian playwright and critic of Malayalam literature.
