= Ntuppuppakkoranendarnnu =

1951 novel by Vaikom Muhammad Basheer

Ntuppuppakkoranendarnnu (My Granddad Had an Elephant!) is a novella by Vaikom Muhammad Basheer published in 1951. It is one of the most famous among his works. The story is woven around the love of Kunjupattumma for Nisar Ahmed. But the dominant character is Kunjupattumma's mother who gloats over the glory that was, and the central theme is the conflict between the value she upholds and those of the educated, forward-looking Nissar Ahmed. The story is filled with pleasant humour and anecdotes from Muslim religious lore.

The title refers to people boasting of the past glories, their "grandfather's elephant", to hide their present shortcomings. Ronald E. Asher translated the work into English under the title Me Grandad 'ad an Elephant.

== Plot ==
• One with the paagyamaruku (Lucky mole) . The "aana" is introduced in the first chapter of the book (the elephant). A stereotypically attractive and well-behaved Muslim girl, Kunju Pathumma fits the mould. She follows the rules established by the "rabbool alameen allah" and has never attempted to disobey her parents, but one day her mother imposes new rules, saying that Pathumma should not play with the neighbourhood kids because she is the daughter of the granddaughter of the aanamakkaar, and she doesn't forget to add "ntuppuppakkoraaanendaarnnu" ( my grandfather had an elephant ). The Pathumma family is wealthy and adamant about upholding their traditions. She has never attended school, and she cannot read because, according to her elders, reading and learning more about the world is a niche designated for the girls affected by “Iblis” (demons). The family is trying to get Paathumma married at the age of 14, and she knows that she doesn't have a say in selecting her groom, and tragically enough, the poor girl thinks that is for the best. She knows that she is going to be married off to an old and rich man, and she always wonders if he will be good to her or not. But apart from her wondering, Paathumma doesn't say anything or ask anything about it because she knows that she is not supposed to do so. She remains in her room the whole day bejewelled ( her ears, abdomen, hands, forehead, and hair are all filled with heavy gold jewellery), waiting for some distantly related aunty of the prospective groom to come into the room and ask her questions, mostly about Allah and his punishments for people who act according to Iblis. Pathumma has a good grasp on all these things, and she always puts an end to her answers by talking about the meteor hit planned by Allah to make sure that the world ends. The aunties check her jewellery by touching, feeling, and flipping it, forgetting that it's not a mannequin but a person sitting there wearing all that. She has always been concerned about her "marugu" (mole), and one day her mother mentions to her that the black mole on her beautiful white face is a symbol of luck and prosperity, hence making it a “paagyamarugu”. She didn't forget to mention (for the nth time) that Paathumma is the grand daughter of the Aanamakkar and that the mole represents the elephant her family owned prior to three generations because the mole is also black.

•The one with anamakkar's Grand daiughter and Vattanadima

There are only two types of people in the world, in Kunjupathumma's mother's opinion: Muslims and Kafirs. She believes that every woman who wears a saree and exits the house with her hair up or braided is "kafrichikal." Because her grandfather owned an elephant that she has never even seen, she believes that she is superior to everything and everyone. She is a person who appreciates wealth and is incredibly proud to have been born into an elephant-related family. She never fails to wear her traditional "Methiyadi" sandals, which stand for her love of her family and their extensive history. Anamakkar's granddaughter wed Vattanadima, Pathumma's father, a wealthy merchant who operates a number of businesses using money from the family and other resources, including real estate. He is well known for preferring to rise through the ranks of a game by fighting. This includes the ongoing argument he had with his siblings over his ancestral homes and the argument he had under the guise of "muthu nabi" to assert his authority over church business. She had no idea that Pathumma's life was about to undergo a drastic change due to flaws in the personalities of both of her parents

• Plot thickens Vattanadima kept fighting With his siblings. The case ended up in court. The amount of jewellery on Pathumma's body began to diminish as the fight went on. Everything was sold off to pay for court appearances, from the dashing three pieces around her neck to the number of bangles in her hand. In the end, Vattanadima loses the case. All of his possessions were divided between his sisters and their husbands, leaving him with nothing more than a small house in a remote location. Pathumma must depart from her enormous home, her staff, and the space where she used to wait for the "inspection aunties." Vattanadima and his family left their house in the middle of the night and began walking in the moonlight to the only piece of land they now owned. Oddly enough, Pathumma wasn't upset or angry. She could now go outside at night and walk under the moon, which made her happy. Her mother used to warn young women—like Pathumma, now 18—against standing in the moonlight for fear that Iblis would catch them. Pathumma finally felt a sense of freedom in the newly born poverty of her family after being confined within the four walls of her room

On the other hand, Pathumma's mother exhibited all the negative emotions associated with a woman who is upset about losing her wealth, including depression, disappointment. She transformed into a wholly pessimistic and negative individual who had lost everything but the methiyadi. She began disparaging everyone, even her own husband and daughter. The fortunate mole changed into a representation of Iblis, which she took to be the source of her suffering. Pathumma was born with a mole to destroy her family, and Pathumma's mother referred to her as "sathaante santhathi" (evil's daughter).

Vattanadima is a moody individual who is constantly thinking about something (in this case, he is probably thinking about how he lost everything). He needed to start working in order to provide for his family. He tried numerous things one after another, all of which were unsuccessful. He settled on selling fish in a far-off market. He received a salary from his job that allowed his family to eat and survive. The affluent vattanadima who is addicted to perfume reeks of fishy odour now. This has taken a toll on him mentally.

Both her parents are still trying to get a groom for Pathumma. If they were searching for a well of tradesmen before now, they are ready to settle for a guy who is just ready. It doesn't matter to them if he is married.

• Nizar Ahmed, Pathumma and the Kuruvi (sparrow)

Nizar Ahmed is a well educated, well built, and good looking wheatish toned man. Cute yet rough; approachable yet tough; fit but not muscular; fair but not so much ( although he doesn't have a pinky ). He is a poet, a communist, and many other things. He has a very special interest in gardening, too. Nizar moves into the home next to Pathumma along with his mother and sister. His parents are professors, and his sister, although younger than Pathumma, behaves much more maturely because of her education. Nizar and Pathumma had been acquainted way before they moved on to the next house.

Pathumma takes her relaxing showers by fetching water from the well in the next house. One day, while she was on her way to bathe, she saw a sparrow bleeding in a “thodu” ( small stream of water). The injuries were caused by a fight the “kuruvi” had with her husband; according to Pathumma, she tried to reach up to the sparrow by stretching herself from the ridge of the stream facing down, where the sparrow lay unconscious. The tiny bush she held onto for balance got uprooted, and she fell into the stream, leaving a few rashes on her hand that were bleeding. Pathumma could not care less about her bleeding; she took the sparrow and started talking to it: “Enthina kettiyonaayittu vayakkittathu ?” (Why did you fight with your husband ) She dripped some water on the inside of its beak and warmed it up. A few attempts later, the sparrow came back to life and flew away in gratitude. The entire incident was witnessed by Nizar, and he asked her “Did you help the kuruvi”. Pathumma was startled to see a man that close who was not her father. She warned him not to come close to the ridge because he would fall down like she did. Nizar asked her how she was going to get out of the ditch, and she replied with a confused look. He jumped to the stream, held Pathumma close to him, almost like hugging her, and started climbing up while Pathumma was holding on to him while making climbing movements. She tried her best not to let her breasts touch his broad chest. After getting out of the stream, Nizar took some medicinal leaves and rubbed her rashes with them, wiping the excess blood off. He said his bye bye and mildly ran off to nowhere, folding his "mundu" around his knees. Pathumma heard none of it. All she could think of was how close she was to him and how close her body felt to his. Later that night, while she was showering half naked in front of the neighbouring well, the same guy came out of the house holding a jug. She immediately covered herself with the piece of mundu she had. Nizar apologised and mentioned that he was there just to take some water from the well and that he was going back ASAP. He asked her to take care of the injury, but again, she only heard parts of it. She was lost in another world. Pathumma was already in love—dumb, cute, and immature love. A few days later, when she heard that new people were moving into the neighbouring house, she was praying to Muthunabi that it had to be the guy that she met that day.

Pathumma began spending much time with Ayisha (Nizar's sister) after a new family moved in. Her mother warned Pathumma that the family was full of kafirs because they didn't cover their hair, wore sarees, and other such things. Pathumma learned more about Nizar through Ayisha. Her talking to an educated girl like Ayisha helped her develop much perspective. She started thinking of herself as a woman who is entitled to have their own opinions and started learning to read and write against her mother's will.

The families of Nizar and Pathumma did argue because they all used to excrete in Nizar's backyard. But the clever guy persuaded the family and explained the concept of having a toilet as well as how to use it. Vattanadima constructed a toilet for themselves, primarily with Nizar's assistance. Other significant changes in Vattanadima's family were also foregone. He somehow grew close to Nizar, gained Nizar's trust, and cared about what Nizar thought about the world, communism, equal rights, and other things. None of these pleased Pathumma's mother: "kafeerungalaanu ippam kampany," she remarked. Your new friend is Kafir The attempts to marry off Pathumma persisted despite everything. She wasn't concerned about it before, but now that Pathumma and Nizar were unavoidably flirting and developing chemistry, she was very concerned. She continued to be silently lost in this world of worries while thinking about it constantly. More than her father, her mother was concerned about this. Somehow, Pathumma got to know that her marriage was almost fixed. but she didn't know with whom she couldn't, even if she wanted to. The more worried she was, the more silent she got. Her conservative mother was so worried about her silence that she legitimately thought that Iblis was living inside her now. She convinced Vattanadima to call someone to get rid of the Iblis in her. This was followed by a series of Islamic rituals to get rid of the evil, they say. The “manthravaadi” beat the living soul out of her. She felt the pain for a few rounds, then all she felt was numbness. She went unconscious and lay in a room for days. Tired eyes, a tired mind, and tears rolling down her lids every second. She hadn't eaten in days, which alarmed Vattanidima and his wife. Pathumma awoke from one of her routinely exhausted naps to find Aayisha sitting next to her. She whispered to her, "Nne kkettichaan povaanu thuttappi," to her..( I think they are gonna marry me off ). Nizar and his mother were also standing in the room. He took her by the hand and laid her head on his shoulders, giving her some water. Pathumma's mother, along with Vattanadima, enters the room, and they say that their daughter's happiness is what matters most to them, and they don't really care about muthunabi, iblis, or kafirs but their daughter and daughter only. The novel concludes with a scene showing Nizar and Pathumma married and appearing happy. Their parents are also content, the two of them. The mother of Pathumma is so ecstatic that she is on the verge of crying. She goes up to Pathumma and mumbles in her ears, “ntppuppade... balyakombanaana...kuyyaneernennu...kuyyana” (my grandfather's giant elephant... it was an antlion... antlion).
