= C. J. Thomas =

Malayalam writer

- Born: 14 November 1918; Koothattukulam, Ernakulam district, Kerala, India
- Died: 14 July 1960 (aged 41); Vellore, Tamil Nadu
- Occupations: Playwright, academic, artist
- Spouse: Rosy Thomas
- Children: Two sons and a daughter
- Relatives: Yohannan (father); Annamma (mother)
- Writing career
- Notable works: Avan Venndum Varunnu; Aa Manushyan Nee Thanne; 1128-il Crime 27

Chollampel John Thomas (1918–1960), popularly known by his initials C. J., was an Indian playwright and literary critic of Malayalam literature. He was best known for his plays, Aa Manushyan Nee Thanne, Avan Venndum Varunnu and 1128-il Crime 27 which introduced modernity into Malayalam theatre. He was also a leader of the Vimochana Samaram, an anti-communist uprising against the First E. M. S. Namboodiripad ministry in Kerala.

== Biography ==
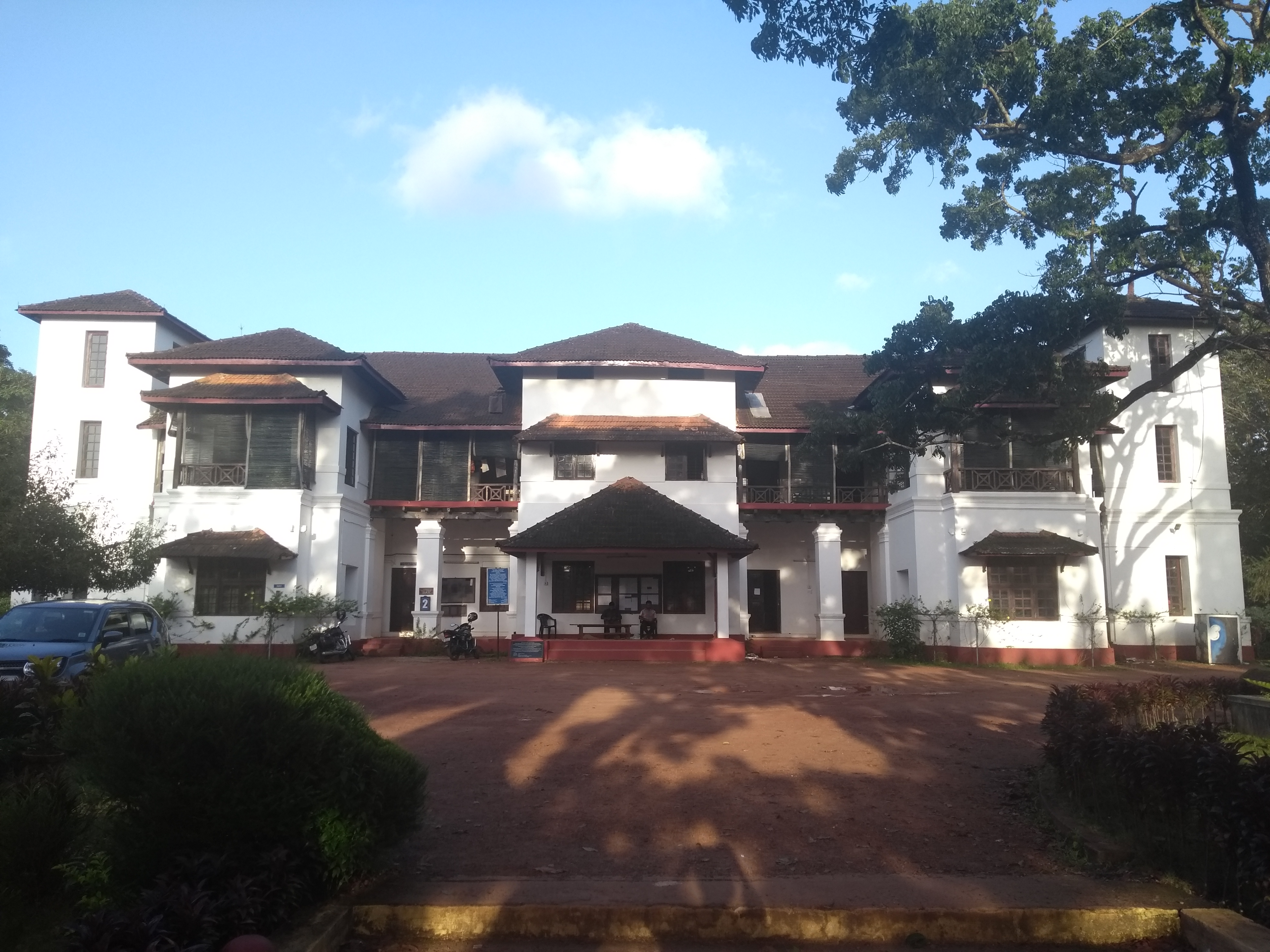
Union Christian College, Aluva, Thomas' alma mater

C.J. was a miracle, both as a human being and as a playwright. He enriched the language, the society and culture during the short span of his life, says George Onakkoor, Thomas' biographer.

C. J. Thomas was born on 14 November 1918 in the Chollampel House at Koothattukulam, in Ernakulam district of the south Indian state of Kerala to a Jacobite Syriac Orthodox Christian priest, Yohannan Cor-Episcopa and Annama of the Chollampel house. Following his father's advice, Thomas prepared to become a priest and after his schooling at the Government High School, Koothattukulam and Vadakara High School, he was ordained a deacon of the Jacobite Syriac Orthodox Church, and completed his pre-university studies at CMS College Kottayam where free education was provided for deacons. Later, he graduated from the Union Christian College, Aluva in 1937 and it was during this time, he quit the priestly vocation. He joined a primary school in Vadakara as a teacher but, having drawn to the Indian independence movement, his relationship with the school management became worse, leading to his resignation from the job. Subsequently, he studied law at the Government Law College, Thiruvananthapuram, and on graduation in 1943, he started practicing as an advocate under N. V. Chacko, a leading lawyer of the times. However, he did not continue with the job and after two months, he quit to become a full-time member of Communist party.

It was around this time, Thomas met M. P. Paul, the renowned critic, and became a faculty of the tutorial college run by Paul but relinquishing the job in 1949, he made an unsuccessful attempt to study for MLitt. He met M Govindan in Madras and worked in the USIS. His next assignment was at the Sahithya Pravarthaka Sahakarana Sangham, a writers' cooperative, a job Thomas got through his friend, D. C. Kizhakemuri, where he designed the covers of the book published by the society. Shortly afterwards, he returned to M. P. Paul's College and had the opportunity to meet Rosy Paul, the daughter of M. P. Paul. After a brief period of romance, he married Rosy, amidst the disapproval of many, on 8 January 1951. After the death of Paul in 1952, He managed the college for a while and ran his own college for a brief period before joining the All India Radio as a producer in 1957 on a three-year contract but left the job after one year. He also worked as the production officer at the Dakshin Bharat Book Trust, at their Chennai and Kochi offices, starting from 1958 and a year later, he was diagnosed with brain tumour. Though he underwent treatment at the Christian Medical College & Hospital, Vellore, he died following a surgery, on 14 July 1960, survived by his wife, their two sons, Binoy and Paulsy and a daughter, Beena. His life has been documented in a biography titled Manalkaattinte Sabdam (The voice of a sandstorm), by George Onakkoor.

== Legacy ==
Thomas' oeuvre consists of 11 plays which included translations, 4 literary criticisms, 6 essay compilations and a novel. His play, Avan Veendum Varunnu (Behold! He Comes Again), published in 1949, was the first modern play in Malayalam language and the three most notable among his plays, Avan Veendum Varunnu, Aa Manushyan Nee Thanne and 1128-il Crime 27, while evidently showing the influence of Bertoldt Brecht and epic theatre, are known to have pioneered the experimental theatre in Malayalam. He based his plays on biblical themes but they deviated from the conventional biblical dramas, often criticising the religious ills.

Thomas was noted for his book designing skills and he was known to have revolutionised the publishing industry in Kerala with his modern designs. It was he who designed the logo, with a swan motif, of the National Book Stall, the retail division of the cooperative society. He translated a number of classics from world literature into Malayalam which included Oedipus Rex and Antigone of Sophocles, Ghosts of Henrik Ibsen and Lysistrata of Aristophanes. The famous line is Oedipus Rex, Thou art the man, Thou the accursed polluter of this land is the base for the title of his play, Aa Manushyan Nee Thanne. He was also involved in the Vimochana Samaram, an uprising against the First E. M. S. Namboodiripad ministry and when Joseph Parecattil, the then Archbishop of Ernakulam, called for a united front against the government, he joined a number of writers and artists such as M. Govindan, Sukumar Azhikode, M. K. Sanu and M. V. Devan, in preparing propaganda materials the government. He wrote a play, Vishsvruksham (The Poisonous Tree), which was staged in 1958 and contributed to strengthening the mass protests which eventually led to the dismissal of the democratically elected government.

== Bibliography ==
=== Plays ===
- — (1949). Avan Veendum Varunnu.
- — (1954). 1128 il Crime 27. Kottayam: Current Books.
- — (1954). Salomi.
- — (1955). Aa Manushyan Nee Thanne. Kottayam: S.P.C.S.
- — (1957). Ruth.
- — (1960). Visha Vriksham.
- — (1960). Pisukkante Kalyanam.
- — (1984). C. J. Thomas Natakangal - I. Kottayam: Little Prince edition.

=== Translations ===
- Chapek, Joseph; Chapek, Karel; Thomas, C. J; Tr (1959). Keedajanmam. Kottayam, SPCS.
- Sophocles; Thomas, C. J; Tr (1955). Antigony. Kottayam, SPCS.
- Kaisler, Arthur; Thomas, C. J. (1979). Nattuchakkiruttu. Trichur, Kerala Sahitya Akademi.
- Ramji; Tr; Thomas, C. J. (1979). Behold! he comes again. Trichur, Kerala Sahitya Akademi.
- Sophocles; Thomas, C. J; Tr (1988). Oedipus.
- Ibsen, Henrik Johan; Author; Thomas, C. J; Tr (1994). Bhootham. Kozhikode, Poorna.

=== Essays/Criticism ===
- — (1948). Socialism.
- — (1948). Mathavum Communisavum. Maluben (2010).
- — (1950). Uyarunna Yavanika (PDF). Kottayam: N.B.S.
- — (1951). Vilayiruthal.
- — (1955). Dhikkariyude Kathal. Thrissur: Current Books (2000).
- — (1985). C J: Vicharavum Veekshanavum. Kottayam: DC Books.
- — (1989). Ivan Ente Priya Puthran.
- — (1993). Manushyante Valarcha. Calicut: Poorna Publications.
- —. Anweshanangal.

=== Novels ===
- Thomas, C. J. Nattuchakkiruttu.

== See also ==
- List of Malayalam-language authors by category
- List of Malayalam-language authors
