= Balyakalasakhi (1967 film) =

- Directed by: J. Sasikumar
- Screenplay by: Vaikom Muhammad Basheer
- Based on: Balyakalasakhi by Vaikom Muhammad Basheer
- Produced by: H. H. Ibrahim
- Starring: Prem Nazir; Sheela; Meena; Kottarakkara Sreedharan Nair
- Cinematography: U. Rajagopal
- Edited by: M. S. Mani
- Music by: M. S. Baburaj
- Production company: Kalalaya Production
- Distributed by: Kanmani Films
- Release date: 14 April 1967
- Country: India
- Language: Malayalam

Balyakalasakhi (childhood companion) is a 1967 Malayalam film, directed by J. Sasikumar. It is an adaptation of Vaikom Muhammad Basheer's famous novel of the same name. Basheer himself wrote the screenplay and dialogues. Balyakalasakhi and Bhargavi Nilayam (1964) are the only films for which Basheer has written the screenplay. The film's story revolves around Majeed and Suhra, who have been in love with each other from childhood.

== Cast ==
- Prem Nazir as Majeed
- Sheela as Suhara
- Kottarakkara Sreedharan Nair
- Meena
- Bahadoor
- T. R. Omana
- Usharani
- T. S. Muthaiah
- Manavalan Joseph
- Nalini
- Baby Usha
- P. J. Antony (guest appearance)

== Soundtrack ==
The music was composed by M. S. Baburaj and the lyrics were written by P. Bhaskaran.

| No. | Song | Singers | Lyrics | Length (m:ss) |
|---|---|---|---|---|
| 1 | "Evideyaanu Thudakkam" | P. B. Sreenivas | P. Bhaskaran | |
| 2 | "Karalil Kanneer Mukil" | P. B. Sreenivas | P. Bhaskaran | |
| 3 | "Manassinte Malarmizhi Thuranneedaan" | M. S. Baburaj | P. Bhaskaran | |
| 4 | "Nin Rakthamente" | S. Janaki, P. B. Sreenivas | P. Bhaskaran | |
| 5 | "Oru Koottam Njaaninnu" | S. Janaki | P. Bhaskaran | |
| 6 | "Ummini Ummini Uyarathu" | Saraswathy | P. Bhaskaran | |
