= Mathilukal =

Novel by Vaikkom Muhammed Basheer

- The cover of Mathilukal.
- Author: Vaikom Muhammad Basheer
- Original title: മതിലുകൾ
- Language: Malayalam
- Genre: Romance, patriotic
- Publisher: DC Books
- Publication date: 1965
- Publication place: India

Mathilukal (Malayalam: മതിലുകൾ, lit. "Walls") is a Malayalam novel written by Vaikom Muhammad Basheer in 1965.

== Theme ==
The theme of the novel, focuses on the love between Basheer, a prisoner, and a female inmate of the prison, who remains unseen throughout the novel. In Mathilukal, though the broad frame is autobiographical and the narration is first person, the details seem to contain sprinkles of fantasy.

== Translations ==
- Voices; The Walls. Translated by V. Abdulla. Bombay: Orient Longman. 1976.
- Walls. Translated by Nivedita Menon. New Delhi: Katha. 1996. pp. 43–72.

== Film adaptation ==
In 1989, a film adaptation of the novel was released, starring Mammootty as Vaikom Muhammad Basheer and K.P.A.C Lalitha as Narayani (voice only), and directed by Adoor Gopalakrishnan. The film was a major critical success, and gained many awards at national and international levels. Mammootty won the National Film Award for Best Actor.
