= Vaikom Muhammad Basheer =

Indian writer (1908–1994)

- വൈക്കം മുഹമ്മദ് ബഷീർ
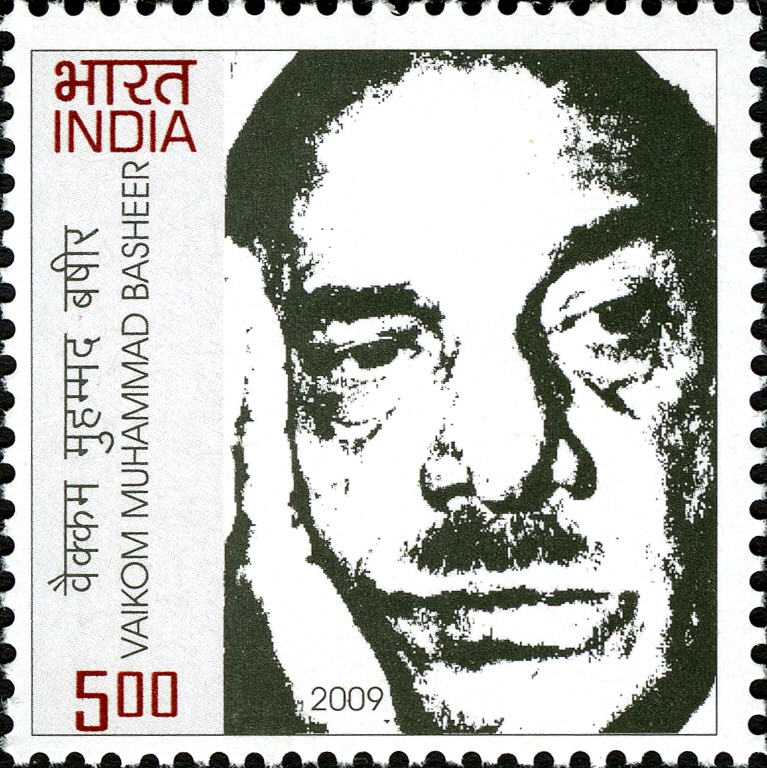
- Basheer on a 2009 stamp of India
- Born: Abdul Rahman Muhammad Basheer; 21 January 1908; Thalayolaparambu, Vaikom, Travancore, British India (present-day Kerala, India)
- Died: 5 July 1994 (aged 86); Beypore, Kerala, India
- Occupations: Writer, freedom fighter
- Spouse: Fathima Basheer (Fabi) (m. 1956)
- Children: 2
- Writing career
- Language: Malayalam
- Genres: Novel, short story, essays, memoirs
- Notable works: Balyakalasakhi; Ntuppuppakkoranendarnnu; Pathummayude Aadu
- Notable awards: Sahitya Akademi Fellowship (1970); Kerala Sahitya Akademi Fellowship (1981); Padma Shri (1982); Kerala State Film Award for Best Story (1989); Lalithambika Antharjanam Award (1992); Muttathu Varkey Award (1993); Vallathol Award (1993)

Vaikom Muhammad Basheer (21 January 1908 – 5 July 1994), popularly referred to as the Beypore Sultan, was an Indian writer of Malayalam literature, a humanist and a freedom fighter in the Indian national movement. He was a novelist and a short story writer known for his path-breaking, down-to-earth style of writing that made him equally popular among the literary critics as well as the public.

In 1982, the Government of India awarded him the Padma Shri, the country's fourth highest civilian honour. He was also a recipient of the Sahitya Akademi Fellowship, Kerala Sahitya Akademi Fellowship, and the Kerala State Film Award for Best Story. He was a recipient of the Vallathol Award in 1993.

His notable works include Balyakalasakhi, Shabdangal, Pathummayude Aadu, Ntuppuppakkoranendarnnu, Mathilukal, Janmadinam and Anargha Nimisham. Several of his works have been translated into other languages.

== Biography ==
Basheer was born on 21 January 1908 in Thalayolaparambu (near Vaikom) Kottayam District, to Kayi Abdurahman, a timber merchant, and his wife, Kunjathumma, as their eldest child. His siblings were Abdulkhader, Pathumma, Haneefa, Anumma and Aboobakker, in order from eldest and youngest. After completing his primary education at a local Malayalam medium school, he joined an English medium school in Vaikom, 5 miles (8.0 km) away, for higher education. It was during this time, he met Mahatma Gandhi, when the Indian independence movement leader came to Vaikom for the satyagraha, which later came to be known as Vaikom Satyagraham, and became his follower. He started wearing Khādī, inspired by the swadeshi ideals of Gandhi. Basheer would later write about his experiences on how he managed to climb on to the car in which Gandhi was travelling and touched his hand.

=== Involvement in the freedom struggle ===
He resolved to join the fight for an Indian Independence, leaving school to do so while he was in the fifth form. Basheer was known for his secular attitude, and he treated all religions with respect. Since there was no active independence movement in Travancore – being a princely state – he went to Malabar district to take part in the Salt Satyagraha in 1930. His group was arrested before they could participate in the satyagraha. Basheer was sentenced to three months imprisonment and sent to Kannur Prison. He became inspired by stories of heroism by revolutionaries like Bhagat Singh, Sukhdev Thapar and Shivaram Rajguru, who were executed while he was in the jail. His release, along with 600 of his fellow prisoners, came in March 1931 following the Gandhi-Irwin pact. Once free, he organized an anti-British movement and edited a revolutionary journal, Ujjivanam, because of which an arrest warrant was issued on him and he left Kerala.

=== Journey ===
Having left Kerala, he embarked upon a long journey that took him across the length and breadth of India and to many places in Asia and Africa for seven years, doing whatever work that seemed likely to keep him from starvation. His occupations ranged from that of a loom fitter, fortune teller, cook, newspaper seller, fruit seller, sports goods agent, accountant, watchman, shepherd, hotel manager to living as an ascetic with Hindu saints and Sufi mystics in their hermitages in Himalayas and in the Ganges basin, following their customs and practices, for more than five years. There were times when, with no water to drink, without any food to eat, he came face to face with death.

After doing menial jobs in cities such as Ajmer, Peshawar, Kashmir and Calcutta, Basheer returned to Ernakulam in the mid-1930s. While trying his hands at various jobs, like washing vessels in hotels, he met a manufacturer of sports goods from Sialkot who offered him an agency in Kerala. And Basheer returned home to find his father's business bankrupt and the family impoverished. He started working as an agent for the Sialkot sports company at Ernakulam, but lost the agency when a bicycle accident incapacitated him temporarily. On recovering, he resumed his endless hunt for jobs. He walked into the office of a newspaper Jayakesari whose editor was also its sole employee. He did not have a position to offer, but offered to pay money if Basheer wrote a story for the paper. Thus Basheer found himself writing stories for Jayakesari and it was in this paper that his first story "Ente Thankam" (My Darling) was published in the year 1937. A path-breaker in Malayalam romantic fiction, it had its heroine a dark-complexioned hunchback. His early stories were published between 1937 and 1941 in Navajeevan, a weekly published in Trivandrum in those days.

=== Imprisonment and after ===
At Kottayam (1941–42), he was arrested and put in a police station lock-up, and later shifted to another lock up in Kollam Kasba police station. The stories he heard from policemen and prisoners there appeared in later works, and he wrote a few stories while at the lock-up itself. He spent a long time in lock-up awaiting trial, and after trial was sentenced to two years and six months imprisonment. He was sent to Thiruvananthapuram central jail. While at jail, he forbade M. P. Paul from publishing Balyakalasakhi. He wrote Premalekhanam (1943) while serving his term and published it on his release. Baalyakaalasakhi was published in 1944 after further revisions, with an introduction by Paul. M. K. Sanu, critic and a friend of Basheer, would later say that M. P. Paul's introduction contributed significantly in developing his writing career. He then made a career as a writer, initially publishing the works himself and carrying them to homes to sell them. He ran two bookstalls in Ernakulam; Circle Bookhouse and later, Basheer's Bookstall. After Indian independence, he showed no further interest in active politics, though concerns over morality and political integrity are present all over his works.

Basheer got married in 1958 when he was over fifty years old and the bride, Fathima was twenty years of age. The couple had a son, Anees and a daughter, Shahina, and the family lived in Beypore, on the southern edge of Kozhikode. During this period he also suffered from mental illness and was twice admitted to mental sanatoriums. He wrote one of his best-known works, Pathummayude Aadu (Pathumma's Goat), while undergoing treatment in a mental hospital in Thrissur. The second spell of paranoia occurred in 1962, after his marriage when he had settled down at Beypore. He recovered both times, and continued his writings.

Basheer, who earned the sobriquet, Beypore Sultan, after he wrote about his later-day life in Beypore as a Sultan, died there on 5 July 1994, survived by his wife and children. Fabi Basheer outlived him for over two decades and died on 15 July 2015, at the age of 77, succumbing to complications following a pneumonia attack.

== Legacy ==
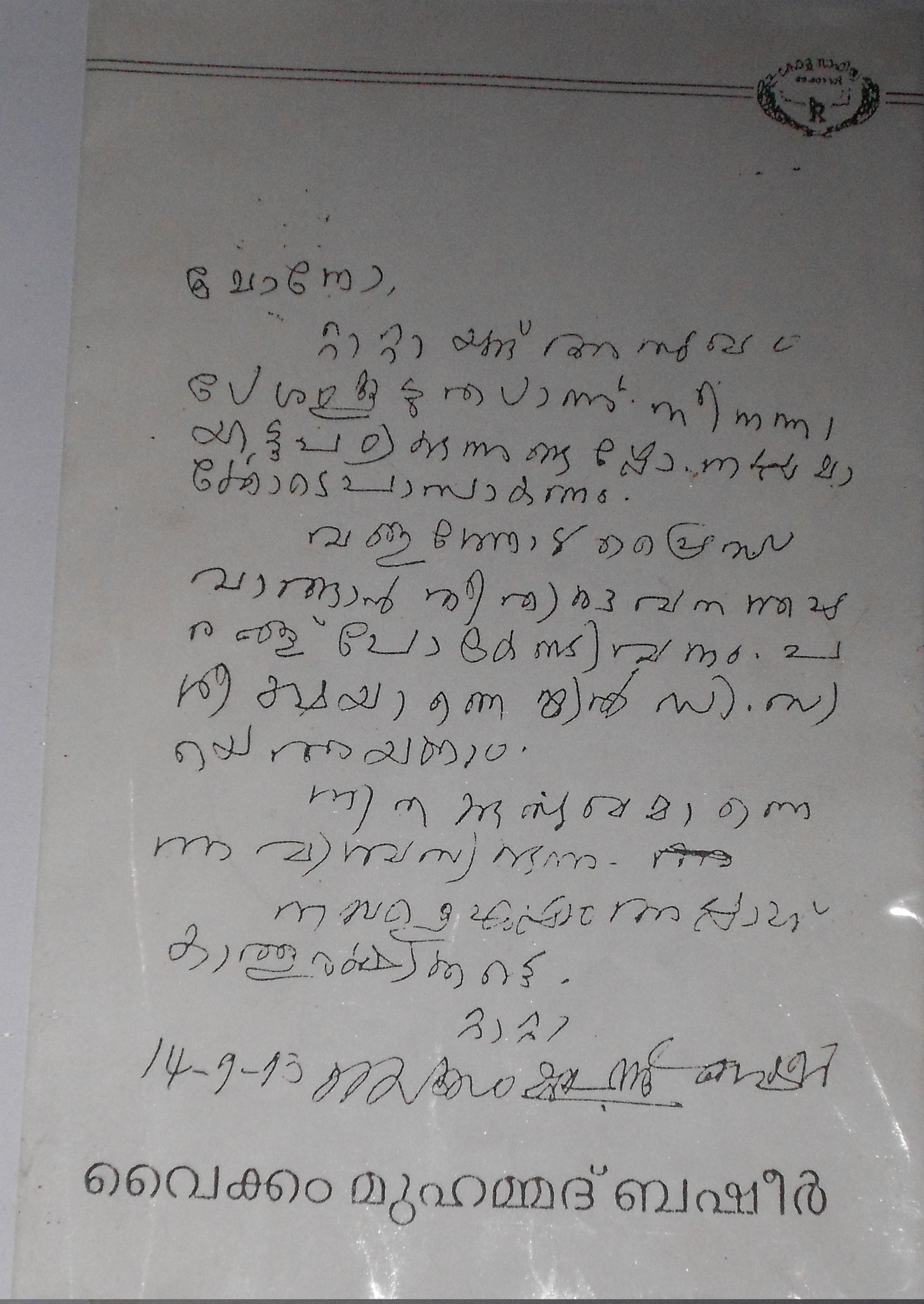
A handwritten letter by Basheer displayed at an exhibition conducted by Kerala Sahitya Akademi

=== Language ===
Basheer is known for his unconventional style of language. He did not differentiate between literary language and the language spoken by the commons and did not care about the grammatical correctness of his sentences. Initially, even his publishers were unappreciative of the beauty of this language; they edited out or modified conversations. Basheer was outraged to find his original writings transcribed into "standardised" Malayalam, devoid of freshness and natural flow, and he forced them to publish the original one instead of the edited one. Basheer's brother Abdul Khader was a Malayalam teacher. Once while reading one of the stories, he asked Basheer, "where are aakhyas and aakhyathas (elements of Malayalam grammar) in this...?". Basheer shouted at him saying that "I am writing in normal Malayalam, how people speak. And you don't try to find your stupid 'aakhya and aakhyaada' in this!". This points out to the writing style of Basheer, without taking care of any grammar, but only in his own village language. Though he made funny remarks regarding his lack of knowledge in Malayalam, he had a very thorough knowledge of it.

Basheer's contempt for grammatical correctness is exemplified by his statement Ninte Lodukkoos Aakhyaadam! ("Your 'silly stupid' grammar!") to his brother, who sermonises him about the importance of grammar (Pathummayude Aadu).

=== Themes ===
Basheer's fictional characters were mostly marginalised people like gamblers, thieves, pickpockets and prostitutes, and they appeared in his works, naive and pure. An astute observer of human character, he skilfully combined humour and pathos in his works. Love, hunger and poverty, life in prison are recurring themes in his works. There is enormous variety in them – of narrative style, of presentation, of philosophical content, of social comment and commitment. His association with India's independence struggle, the experiences during his long travels and the conditions that existed in Kerala, particularly in the neighbourhood of his home and among the Muslim community – all had a major impact on them. Politics and prison, homosexuality, all were grist to his mill. All of Basheer's love stories have found their way into the hearts of readers; perhaps no other writer has had such an influence on the way Malayalis view love. The major theme of all Basheer stories is love and humanity. In the story Mucheettukalikkarante Makal (The Card sharp's Daughter), when Sainaba comes out of the water after stealing his bananas, Mandan Muthappa says only one thing: "Sainaba go home and dry your hair else you may fall sick". This fine thread of humanism can be experienced in almost all his stories.

About the influence of Western literature in his works, Basheer once wrote: "I can readily say that I have not been influenced by any literature, Western or Eastern, for, when I started writing I had no idea of literature. Even now it is not much different. It is only after I had written quite a bit, that I had opportunities to contact Western literature. I read all that I could get hold of—Somerset Maugham, Steinbeck, Maupassant, Flaubert, Romain Rolland, Gorky, Chekhov, Hemingway, Pearl S. Buck, Shakespeare, Galsworthy, Shaw... In fact, I organised one or two bookstalls so that I could get more books to read. But I read these books mainly to know their craft. I myself had plenty of experience to write about! I have even now! I am unable to ascertain who has influenced me. Perhaps Romain Rolland and Steinbeck—but even they, not much."

=== Works ===
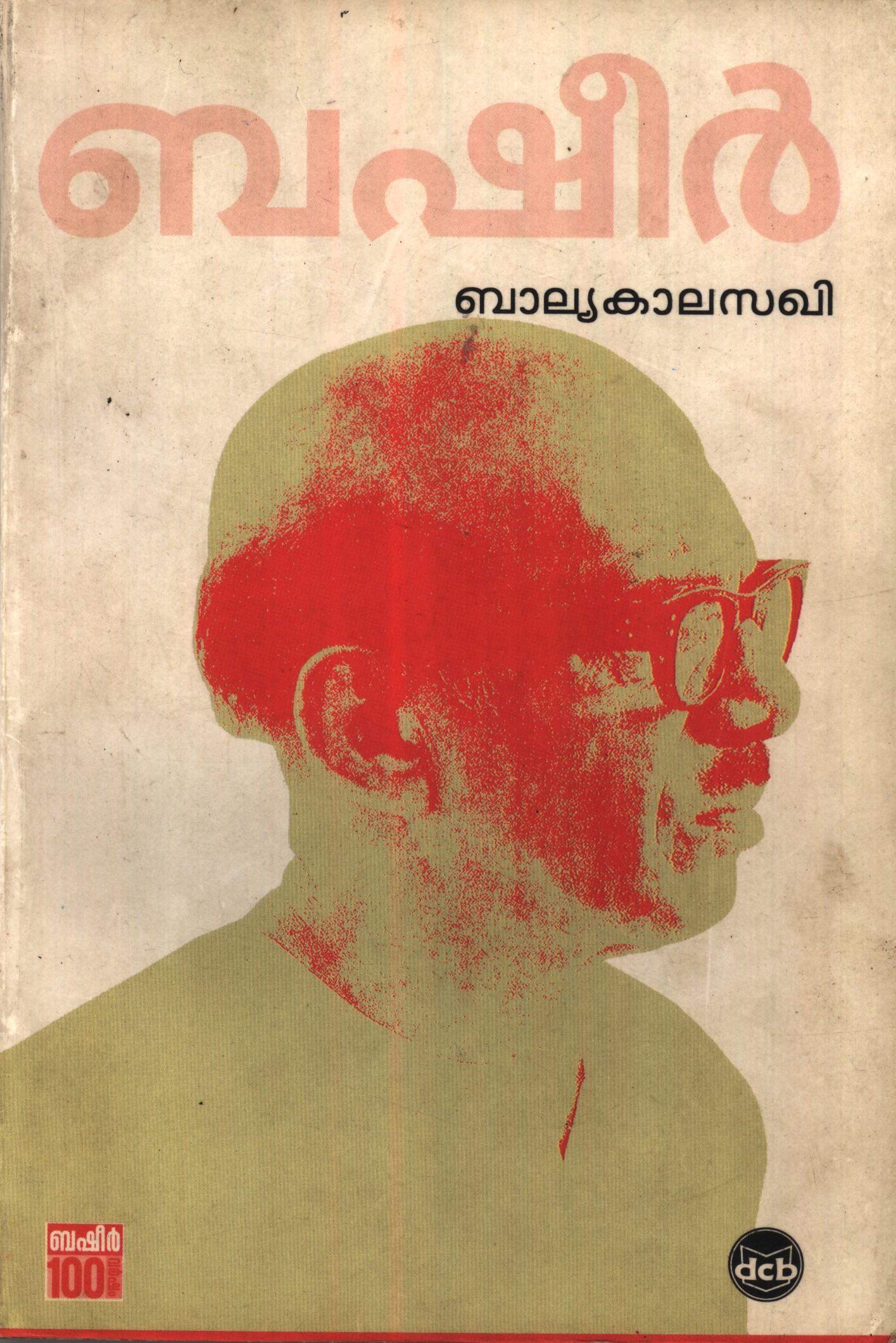
Cover page of Balyakalasakhi

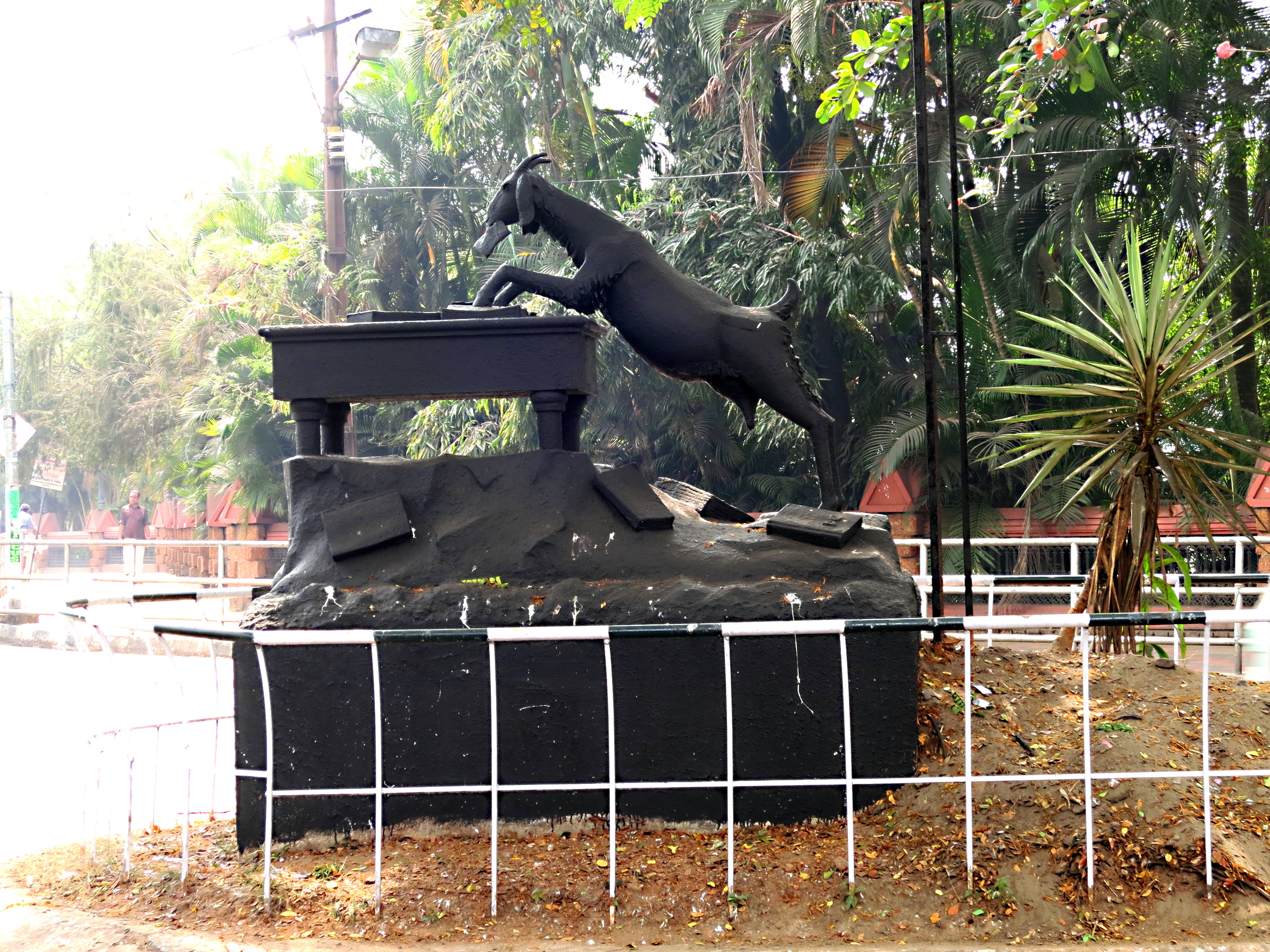
A sculpture of Basheer's Pathummayude Aadu at Mananchira, Kozhikode

Almost all of Basheer's writing can be seen as falling under the heading of prose fiction – short stories and novels, though there is also a one-act play and volumes of essays and reminiscences. Basheer's fiction is varied and full of contrasts. There are poignant situations as well as merrier ones – and commonly both in the same narrative. There are among his output realistic stories and tales of the supernatural. There are purely narrative pieces and others which have the quality of poems in prose. In all, a superficially simple style conceals a subtlety of expression. His works have been translated into 18 languages.

His literary career started off with the novel Premalekhanam, a love story between Keshavan Nair – a young bank employee, an upper caste Hindu (Nair) – and Saramma – an unemployed Christian woman. The film adaptation of the story was by P. A. Backer in 1985, with the lead roles played by Soman and Swapna. It was remade again by Aneesh Anwar in 2017, featuring Farhaan Faasil, Joy Mathew and Sheela.

Premalekhanam was followed by the novel Balyakalasakhi – a tragic love story between Majeed and Suhra – which is among the most important novels in Malayalam literature in spite of its relatively small size (75 pages), and is commonly agreed upon as his magnum opus. In his foreword to Balyakalasakhi, Jeevithathil Ninnum Oru Aedu (A Page From Life), M. P. Paul brings out the beauty of this novel, and how it is different from run-of-the-mill love stories. The novel was later adapted into a film by Sasikumar, under the same name. It was remade with the same title in 2014, by Pramod Payyannur, with Mammootty and Isha Talwar playing the lead.

The autobiographical Janmadinam ("Birthday", 1945) is about a writer struggling to feed himself on his birthday. While many of the stories present situations to which the average reader can easily relate, the darker, seamier side of human existence also finds a major place, as in the novel Shabdangal ("Voices", 1947), which faced heavy criticism for violence and vulgarity.

Ntuppuppakkoranendarnnu ("My Gran'dad 'ad an Elephant", 1951) is a fierce attack on the superstitious practices that existed among Muslims. Its protagonist is Kunjupathumma, a naive, innocent and illiterate village belle. She falls in love with an educated, progressive, city-bred man, Nisaar Ahamed. Illiteracy is fertile soil for superstitions, and the novel is about education enlightening people and making them shed age-old conventions. Velichathinentoru Velicham (a crude translation can be "What a bright brightness!") one of the most quoted Basheer phrases occurs in Ntuppuppaakkoraanaendaarnnu. People boast of the glory of days past, their "grandfather's elephants", but that is just a ploy to hide their shortcomings. The book was later translated into English by R. E. Asher.

His next novel was Pathummayude Aadu, an autobiographical work published in 1959, featuring mostly his family members. The book tells the story of everyday life in a Muslim family. Mathilukal (Walls) deals with prison life in the pre-independence days. It is a novel of sad irony set against a turbulent political backdrop. The novelist falls in love with a woman sentenced for life who is separated from him by insurmountable walls. They exchange love-promises standing on two sides of a wall, only to be separated without even being able to say good-bye. Before he "met" Naraayani, the loneliness and restrictions of prison life was killing Basheer; but when the orders for his release arrive he loudly protests, "Who needs freedom? Outside is an even bigger jail." The novel was later made into a film with same name by Adoor Gopalakrishnan with Mammootty playing Basheer.

Sthalathe Pradhana Divyan, Anavariyum Ponkurishum, Mucheettukalikkarante Makal and Ettukali Mammoonju featured the life of real life characters in his native village of Thalayolaparambu (regarded as Sthalam in these works). Perch, a Chennai based theatre, has adapted portions from Premalekhanam and Mucheettukalikkarante Makal as a drama under the title, The Moonshine and the Sky Toffee.

=== Personal life ===
Fabi Basheer published his memoirs, Basheerinte Ediye, which details her life with her husband.

== Awards and honours ==
Sahitya Akademi honoured Basheer with their fellowship in 1970, the same year as he was honoured with the distinguished fellowship by the Kerala Sahitya Akademi. The Government of India awarded him the fourth highest civilian honour of the Padma Shri in 1982 and five years later, the University of Calicut conferred on him the honorary degree of the Doctor of Letters on 19 January 1987. He received the Kerala State Film Award for Best Story for the Adoor Gopalakrishnan film, Mathilukal in 1989 and the inaugural Lalithambika Antharjanam Award in 1992 followed by the Prem Nazir Award the same year. He received two awards in 1993, the Muttathu Varkey Award and the Vallathol Award. The Thamrapathra'of the Government of India (1972), Abu Dhabi Malayala Samajam Literary Award (1982), Samskaradeepam Award (1987) and Jeddah Arangu Award (1994) were some of the other awards received by him. Mathrubhumi issued a festschrift on him, Ormmayile Basheer (Basheer - Reminiscences) in 2003 which featured several articles and photos and the India Post released a commemorative postage stamp, depicting his image, on 21 January 2009.

== Published works ==
=== Novels ===
Excerpts from the story Amma (The Mother)

I said nothing. I was shaken, unable to breathe. The whole world was asleep! My mother alone was awake! Mother brought a vessel of water and asked me to wash my hands and feet. Then she placed a plate of rice before me.

She asked me nothing.

I was amazed. "How did you know, Umma, that I was coming today?"

Mother replied, "Oh... I cook rice and wait every night."

It was a simple statement. Every night I did not turn up, but mother had kept awake waiting for me.

The years have passed. Many things have happened.

But mothers still wait for their sons.

"Son, I just want to see you..."

Novels
#	Title	Translation in English	Year of Publishing
1	Premalekhanam	The Love Letter	1943
2	Balyakalasakhi	Childhood Companion	1944
3	Shabdangal	The Voices	1947
4	Ntuppuppakkoranendarnnu	My Grandad Had an Elephant	1951
5	Maranathinte Nizhalil	In the Shadow of Death	1951
6	Mucheettukalikkarante Makal	The Card Sharper's Daughter	1951
7	Sthalathe Pradhana Divyan	The Principal Divine of the Place	1953
8	Anavariyum Ponkurishum	Elephant Scooper and Golden Cross	1953
9	Jeevithanizhalppadukal	The Shadows of Life	1954
10	Pathummayude Aadu	Paththumma's Goat	1959
11	Mathilukal	Walls	1965
12	Thara Specials		1968
13	Manthrikappoocha	The Magic Cat	1968
14	Prempatta	The Loving Cockroach (Published posthumously)	2006

=== Short stories ===
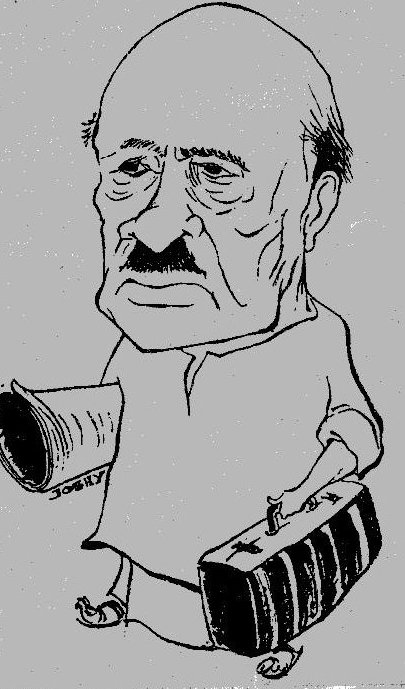
Basheer - a caricature

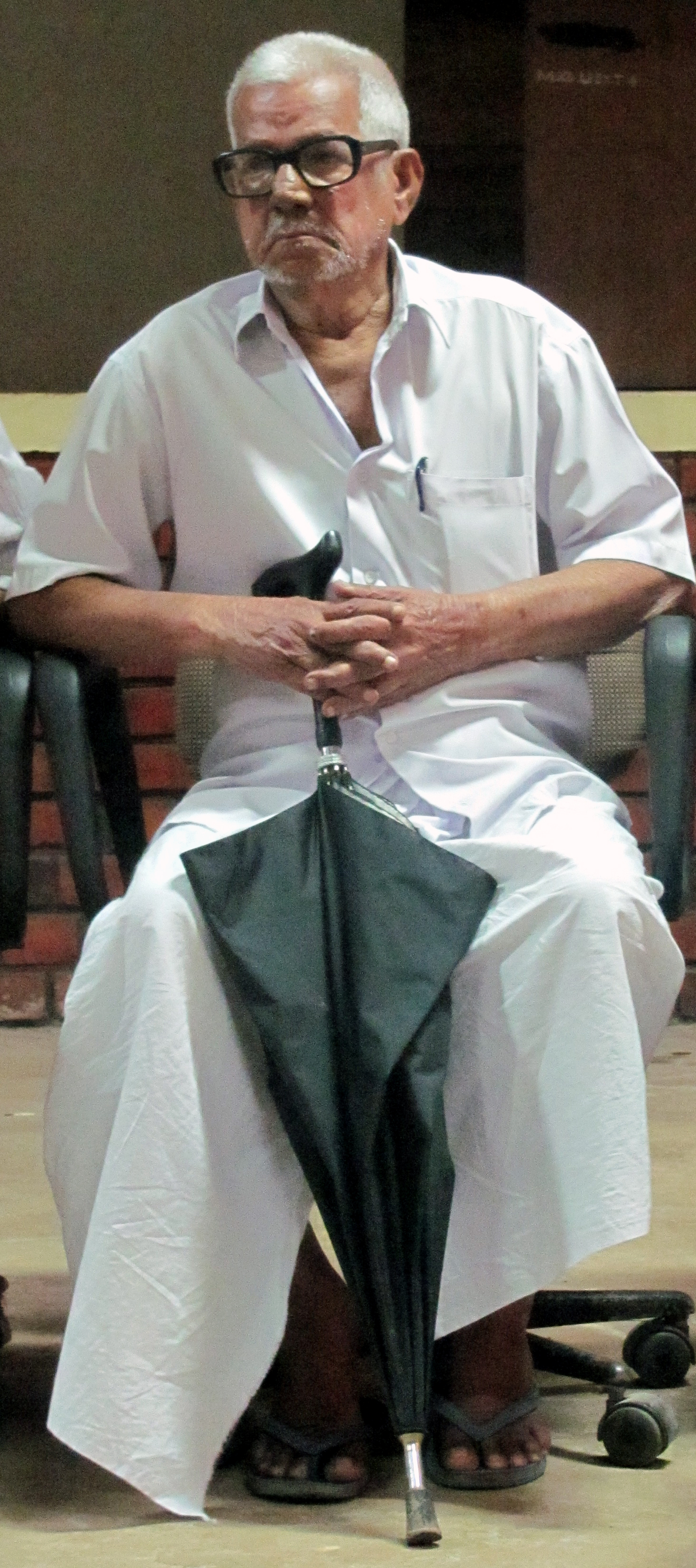
Abubakar -Basheer's brother

Short stories
#	Title	Translation in English	Year of Publishing
1	Janmadinam	The Birthday	1945
2	Ormakkurippu	Jottings from Memory	1946
3	Anargha Nimisham	Invaluable Moment (See "Anal Haq")	1946
4	Viddikalude Swargam	Fools' Paradise	1948
5	Pavappettavarude Veshya	The Prostitute of the Poor	1952
6	Vishwavikhyathamaya Mookku	The World-renowned Nose	1954
7	Visappu	The Hunger	1954
8	Oru Bhagavad Gitayum Kure Mulakalum	A Bhagavadgeetha and Some Breasts	1967
9	Anappooda	Elephant-hair	1975
10	Chirikkunna Marappava	The Laughing Wooden Doll	1975
11	Bhoomiyude Avakashikal	The Inheritors of the Earth	1977
12	Shinkidimunkan	The Fools' God Man	1991
13	Sarpayajnam	The Snake Ritual	
14	പാമ്പും കണ്ണാടിയും	The Snake And The Mirrior	

=== Others ===
Other works
#	Title	Translation in English	Year of Publishing	Notes
1	Dharmarajyam		1938	Essays
2	Kathabeejam	Story Seed	1945	Play
3	Nerum Nunayum	Truth and Lie	1969	Commentary and letters
4	Ormayude Arakal	The Cells of Memory	1973	Commentary and memoirs
5	Anuragathinte Dinangal	The Days of Desire	1983	Diary
6	Bhargavi Nilayam	Bhargavi's Mansion	1985	Screenplay; adapted from the short story "Neelavelicham"
7	M. P. Paul		1991	Reminiscences of his friendship with M. P. Paul
8	Cheviyorkkuka! Anthimakahalam	Hark! The Final Clarion-call!!	1992	Speech
9	Yaa Ilaahi!	Oh God!	1997	Collection of stories, essays, letters and poem; Published posthumously
10	Jeevitham Oru Anugraham	Life is a Blessing	2000	Collection of stories, essays and play; Published posthumously
11	Basheerinte Kathukal	Basheer's Letters	2008	Letters; Published posthumously

== Filmography ==
Filmography
#	Year	Title	Contribution
1	1964	Bhargavi Nilayam	Story, screenplay, dialogues
2	1967	Balyakalasakhi	Story, screenplay, dialogues
3	1975	Mucheettukalikkaarante Makkal	Story
4	1985	Premalekhanam	Story
5	1988	Dhwani	Acting
6	1990	Mathilukal	Story
7	1995	Sasinas	Story
8	2013	Kathaveedu	Story
9	2014	Balyakalasakhi	Story
10	2017	Basheerinte Premalekhanam	Story
11	2023	Neelavelicham	Story, screenplay, dialogues
