= Balyakalasakhi =

1944 book by Vaikom Muhammad Basheer

- Balyakalasakhi by DC Books
- Author: Vaikom Muhammad Basheer
- Original title: ബാല്യകാലസഖി
- Language: Malayalam
- Genre: Romance novel
- Publisher: DC Books
- Publication date: 1944
- Publication place: India
- Media type: Print
- Pages: 96
- ISBN: 978-8171300099

Balyakalasakhi (Malayalam: ബാല്യകാലസഖി; transl. Childhood Companion) is a Malayalam romantic tragedy novel written by Vaikom Muhammad Basheer. Published in 1944, it is considered by many as Basheer's best work. The story revolves around Majeed and Suhra, who have been in love with each other since their childhood. By Basheer's own admission, the story is largely autobiographical.

== Plot summary ==
The childhood romance between the two neighbours blossoms into passionate love during adolescence. Majeed's father was rich once, so could send him to a school in a distant town, although he was not very good at studies. Suhra's father on the other hand had trouble making ends meet. Even then he wanted to send his daughter, who was good at studies to school. But after her father's death, all her hopes of further studies was ruined. Majeed begs his father to sponsor Suhra's education, but he refuses.

Majeed leaves home after a skirmish with his father, and wanders over distant lands for a long time before returning home. On his return, he finds that his family's former affluence is all gone, and that his beloved Suhra has married someone else. He is grief struck at the loss of love, and this is when Suhra turns up at his home. She is a shadow of her former self. The beautiful, sunshiny, vibrant Suhra of old is now a woman worn out by life, battered hard by a loveless marriage to an abusive husband. Majeed commands her, "Suhra, don't go back!" and she stays.

Majeed leaves home once again, but this time with plans on his mind. He needs to find a job, to ward off poverty, and thus he reaches a North Indian city. He finds work as a salesman but one day he meets with a bicycle accident in which he loses a leg. The day after he is discharged from hospital, he is informed that he is fired from his job. He again sets off on a job quest knocking at every door, wearing off his soles. He finds work as a dish-washer in a hotel. As he scrubs dirty dishes each day, he dreams of Suhra back home waiting for him to return. He must make enough money to return home and repay debts, before he can finally marry the woman of his life. His mother writes to him that Suhra is sick and subsequently of Suhra's death.

== Literary significance and criticism ==
The first half of the story, dealing with childhood and adolescence is written in a pleasant tone. The latter half is written in a sorrowful tone. It tells about the hope that people living in near poverty have about their future. They accumulate their dreams and keep their desires to themselves and go on with the hard grind of daily life, struggling to eke out a living.

The lightness of narrative style disguises an undercurrent of poignancy. Even in the moments of utter grief, the author cannot let go of humour. Intense tragedy is dished out as if it were something meant to make the readers laugh.

The novel talks about love in its truest, sincerest form; yet that very kind of love goes unfulfilled. The lovers have to face harsh reality of life, they have to go through hell, and even worse, separation, but all their sacrifice fetches no rewards. As M. P. Paul suggests in his foreword to the book, Jeevithathil Ninnum Oru Aedu, it is a page torn from life, bleeding at its edges.

The novel has been translated in to several Indian and Global languages, including English by R E Asher and Achamma Coilparampil Chandrasekharan. The Arabic version also came out last year, rendered by Suhail Abdul Hakeem Wafy, published by Arabic Scientific Publishers, Lebanon.

=== Ummini Valya Onnu ===
One of the phrases in Balyakalasakhi that is always associated to Basheer's name is "Ummini Valya Onnu" - Malayalam for "a slightly bigger 1". While at school, Majeed discovers a new mathematical result, that one plus one must be "a slightly bigger one". Majeed is puzzled when the teacher punishes him for this discovery, for he had seen two rivers merge into a slightly bigger one. This could be considered as a manifestation of Basheer's talent to think creatively and subjectively. Later when he knocks doors for a job, such skills in mathematics cannot help him find a decent paying situation. This phrase has inspired social constructivism for administrators and social reformers.

== Basheer on Majeed ==
Basheer said that Majeed of Balyakalasakhi is himself. He started work on the book after seeing a terrifying nightmare which reminded him of his childhood companion Suhara's death. At the time, he was living in Calcutta. He used to sleep on the rooftop of a building after a heavy day's work. One night, he saw a monster in his sleep. Waking up, he found that he was standing on the edge of the rooftop, a step away from falling. He began writing the book in English. Highly dissatisfied with what he had written, he destroyed it. Later, he rewrote the story from scratch and perfected it through countless revisions. (Basheer was a hard labourer at writing. His simplicity of style is no accident. Almost everything he wrote was reworked and revised innumerable times before they went into press.)

== Film adaptations ==
- Balyakalasakhi: A 1967 film starring Prem Nazir as Majeed and Sheela as Suhara, and directed by Sasikumar. Basheer himself wrote the screenplay and dialogues for the film.
- Balyakalasakhi: A 2014 film starring Mammootty as Majeed and Isha Talwar as Suhara, and scripted and directed by Pramod Payyannur.
