= Government Higher Secondary School =

Government Higher Secondary School may refer to:

== India ==
=== Arunachal Pradesh ===
- Independent Golden Jubilee Government Higher Secondary School, Pasighat

=== Assam ===
- Golaghat Government Bezbaruah Higher Secondary School

=== Kerala ===
- Government Higher Secondary School Maloth Kasba
- Government Higher Secondary School Nedungome
- Government Higher Secondary School Omallur
- Government Higher Secondary School, Palayamkunnu
- Government Higher Secondary School Panamattom
- Government Higher Secondary School, Pandikkad
- Government Higher Secondary School for Girls Cottonhill
- Government Model Boys Higher Secondary School, Kollam
- Government Model Higher Secondary School, Punnamoodu
- Government Model Boys Higher Secondary School, Thiruvananthapuram
- Government Model Higher Secondary School for Boys, Thrissur
- Government Model Higher Secondary School, Varkala
- Meenangadi Government Higher Secondary School
- Vailoppilli Sreedhara Menon Memorial Government Vocational Higher Secondary School

=== Tamil Nadu ===
- Government Higher Secondary School, Eriyodu
- Government Higher Secondary School Kurunikulathupatti
- Government Higher Secondary School Palayajayankondam
- Bharathiar Government Higher Secondary School

== Pakistan ==
=== Pakistan Punjab ===
- Government Boys Higher Secondary School, Ahmad Nagar Chattha
- Government Girls Higher Secondary School, Ahmad Nagar Chattha

== See also ==
- Government Higher Secondary Institute Botingoo, Jammu and Kashmir, India
- Government Senior Secondary School (disambiguation)
