= Keleswaram =

- Village
- Keleswaram, Thiruvananthapuram, (Kerala) Keleswaram (India)
- Coordinates: 8°25′16.3″N 76°59′58.6″E
- Country: India
- State: Kerala
- District: Thiruvananthapuram

Government
  - Body: Gram panchayat
- Elevation: 44.58 m (146.3 ft)

Population (2001)
  - Total: 36,836

Languages
  - Official: Malayalam, English
- Time zone: UTC+5:30 (IST)
- PIN: 695042
- Vehicle registration: KL-

Keleswaram is a small village in Thiruvananthapuram district in the state of Kerala, India. This place is located between Peringammala and Punnamoodu .

== Geography ==
It is located at an altitude of 44.58 m above the mean sea level with the geographic coordinates of 8°25′16.3″N 76°59′58.6″E.

== Places Near by Keleswaram ==
The famous Keleswaram Mahadeva Temple is situated here. The places near Keleswaram are Peringammala, Punnamoodu, Kalliyoor, and Balaramapuram. The Government Model Higher Secondary School, Punnamoodu is one of the oldest schools in Thiruvananthapuram District, Kerala, India which is 1 km away from Keleswaram . It was established in 1915. Balaramapuram is other famous place 3 km away from keleswaram, known as the centre for the production of traditional varieties of handloom textiles meant for the contemporary cloth wearing style of Kerala. Its unique craftsmanship makes it an ideal heirloom.

== Demographics ==
As of 2001 India census, Keleswaram had a population of 36,836 with 18,176 males and 18,660 females.

== Religion ==
The population of Keleswaram mainly practices Hinduism and Christianity.The famous Keleswaram Mahadeva Temple, Raktheshwari devi temple and churches also situated here.
