= Kulam (film) =

1997 film by Lenin Rajendran

- Directed by: Lenin Rajendran
- Written by: Lenin Rajendran (dialogues)
- Screenplay by: Lenin Rajendran
- Based on: Marthandavarma by C. V. Raman Pillai
- Starring: Suresh Gopi; Bhanupriya; Vijayaraghavan; Jagathy Sreekumar
- Cinematography: Madhu Ambat
- Edited by: B. Lenin; V. T. Vijayan
- Music by: Songs: M. G. Radhakrishnan; Background Score: Mohan Sithara
- Production company: Usha Priya Movie Makers
- Distributed by: Usha Priya Movie Makers
- Release date: 6 February 1997
- Country: India
- Language: Malayalam

Kulam is a 1997 Indian Malayalam-language film, directed by Lenin Rajendran, loosely based on the historical novel Marthandavarma, by C. V. Raman Pillai. The film stars Suresh Gopi, Bhanupriya, Vijayaraghavan and Jagathy Sreekumar. The music direction of the film has composed by MG Radhakrishnan.

== Plot ==
The film begins with an oath undertaken by Etu Veetil Pilamar, eight lords of Venad kingdom led by Kudamon Pillai that they never withdraw from their decisions. Thampi, son of the king of Venad arrives and reveals that he intend to assassinate Marthandavarma, the rightful heir to the throne. All except for Kazhakkoottathu Pillai swear their alliance to Thampi.

Thampi is smitten by Kudamon Pillai's beautiful niece Subadra since they first met when she was 10. Subadra's mother Devayani was murdered by Kudaman Pillai for marrying someone he does not approve of. Thampi attempts to rape Subhadra aided by her aunt. Subhadra gets injured but manages to escape the attempt.

Kumaran joins the Etu Veetil house as a fighter. Subadra falls in love with Kumaran. They gets married with the blessings of Kudaman Pillai. They start a happy life though Kumaran is occasionally upset by stories about Subhadra's character. Thampi with his close aide Sundarayyan conspires to add to Kumaran's suspicions.

Kudaman Pillai gets further angered when the king takes away the powers of Pillai. Now that the king is in deathbed, Thampi and Pillais plans to attack and kill Marthandavarma when he visits Mangoikkal kuruppu. Kumaran is chosen to lead the attack. He is warned that this is Thampi's plot to get him killed. Kumaran tries to flee, but Thampi attacks Kumaran and injures him. Kumaran finally runs away for life.

Subhadra wows to find out Kumaran. She confronts Thampi who threatens to rape her, but spares her.

A mentally unstable but physically strong Channan appears out of nowhere whom Etu Veetil's soldiers could not catch. Subadra takes a liking to Channan and gives him asylum. She request Channa to help her find out Kumaran.

Subadra seduces Ramanamadom Pillai. A drunk Pillai reveals the plot to kill Marthandavarma near the palace by surrounding the palace. Subadra conveys the plan to Channan.

Channan finds Kumaran and inform Subadra. He lives in a Muslim nomad tent and is married to a Muslim woman. Subhadra confronts Kumaran who ends up crying when Subadra tells she dreamt of child and so much happiness while marrying Kumaran. Subadra leaves back to her place.

Now scene shifts to a post-battle field area where Thampi walks amidst his dead men.

At Etu Veetil house Kudaman Pillai asks everyone who leaked their plans. Ramanamadom Pillai confesses that he told it to Subadra. An injured Kazhakkoottathu Pillai appears revealing that Marthandavarmas men killed his sons and auctioned off his daughters to fishermen. All Pillais fear for their life and even contemplates seeking forgiveness from Marthandavarma.

Thampi meets Kudaman Pillai and say either he comes back victorious or dead and leaves the area

Kudaman Pillai knocks on Subadra's room and when Subadra comes out, stabs Subadra. He asks why she cheated on him. Subadra says she learned that it was Thampi who destroyed her life, so she got revenge. Also, that she now knew who her father is, whom Kudaman Pillai never reveals. Her father is the Commander in chief of the kingdom. By this time outside, people shouting and noises is heard. Kudaman Pillai goes with a sword, saying that as long as he is alive, he won't allow anyone to touch anybody of the Etu Veetil area.

Channan enters Subadra's room to find dying Subhadra. Subadra request him to show his real face. Channan reveals that he is Ananthapadmanabhan, her step brother. Subadra dies while lying in the hands of her brother.

== Cast ==
- Bhanupriya as Subhadra (Voice by Bhagyalekshmi)
- Suresh Gopi as Ananthapadmanabhan (Braanthan Chaanthaan)
- Thilakan as Kudaman Pillai
- Nassar as Thampy
- Vijayaraghavan as Kumaran
- Jagathy Sreekumar as Ramanamadam Pillai
- Narendra Prasad as Kazhakkottathu Pillai
- P. R. Varalakshmi as Ammayi, Wife of Kudman Pillai
- Jose Pellissery as Pallichal Pillai
- Kozhikode Narayanan Nair as Thirumadathil Pillai
- Paravoor Ramachandran as Venganoor Pillai
- Elias Babu as Kulathoor Pillai
- Vijayan Peringod as Chempazhanthy Pillai
- M. R. Gopakumar as Sundarayya
- Bheeman Raghu
- Bharath Gopi
- P. R. Varalakshmi
- Mullanezhi as Vaidyar

== Soundtrack ==
The music was composed by M. G. Radhakrishnan and the lyrics were written by V. Madhusoodanan Nair.

No.	Song	Singers	Lyrics	Raga(s)	Length (m:ss)
1	"Agni Sathyangal"	V. Madhusoodanan Nair	V. Madhusoodanan Nair	Mohanam	
2	"Chandana Shilayil"	K. S. Chithra, M. G. Radhakrishnan	V. Madhusoodanan Nair	Kapi	
3	"Enthamme Chundathu" (F)	K. S. Chithra	V. Madhusoodanan Nair	Hamsanadam	
4	"Enthamme Chundathu" (M)	K. J. Yesudas	V. Madhusoodanan Nair	Hamsanadam	
5	"Thiranthu Paarthen"	S. P. Balasubrahmanyam	V. Madhusoodanan Nair		
