= Padmaprabha Literary Award =

Literary award in India

- Award for individual contributions to Malayalam literature
- Awarded for: Literary award in India
- Sponsored by: Padmaprabha Foundation
- Rewards: ₹75,000, citation, a gem-studded ring
- First award: 1996
- Final award: 2024

Highlights
- Total awarded: 26
- First winner: Unnikrishnan Puthoor
- Last winner: R. Rajasree

Padmaprabha Literary Award for contributions to the field of Malayalam literature is instituted by the Padmaprabha Foundation. A prestigious literary prize in Malayalam, the award was instituted in memory of freedom fighter and socialist Padmaprabha. It carries a purse of Rs 75,000, a gem-studded ring and plaque. The awards are announced every year.

== List of winners ==
- 1996 Unnikrishnan Puthoor
- 1997 Ponkunnam Varkey
- 1998 M. Achuthan
- 1999 M. Leelavathi
- 2000 N. P. Muhammed
- 2001 Kakkanadan
- 2002 Akkitham Achuthan Namboothiri
- 2003 K. T. Muhammed
- 2004 O. N. V. Kurup
- 2005 P. Valsala
- 2006 C. Radhakrishnan
- 2007 U. A. Khader
- 2008 K. Satchidanandan
- 2009 N. S. Madhavan
- 2010 M. K. Sanu
- 2011 Sarah Joseph
- 2012 Vijayalakshmi
- 2013 C. V. Balakrishnan
- 2014 Benyamin
- 2015 V. Madhusoodhanan Nair
- 2016 Prabha Varma
- 2018 Kalpatta Narayanan
- 2019 Santhosh Echikkanam
- 2020 Sreekumaran Thampi
- 2023 Subhash Chandran
- 2024 Rafeek Ahamed
- 2025 Alankode Leelakrishnan
- 2026 R. Rajasree
