= Sylhet bus terminal =

Bus station in Sylhet, Bangladesh

Sylhet bus terminal সিলেট বাস টার্মিনাল
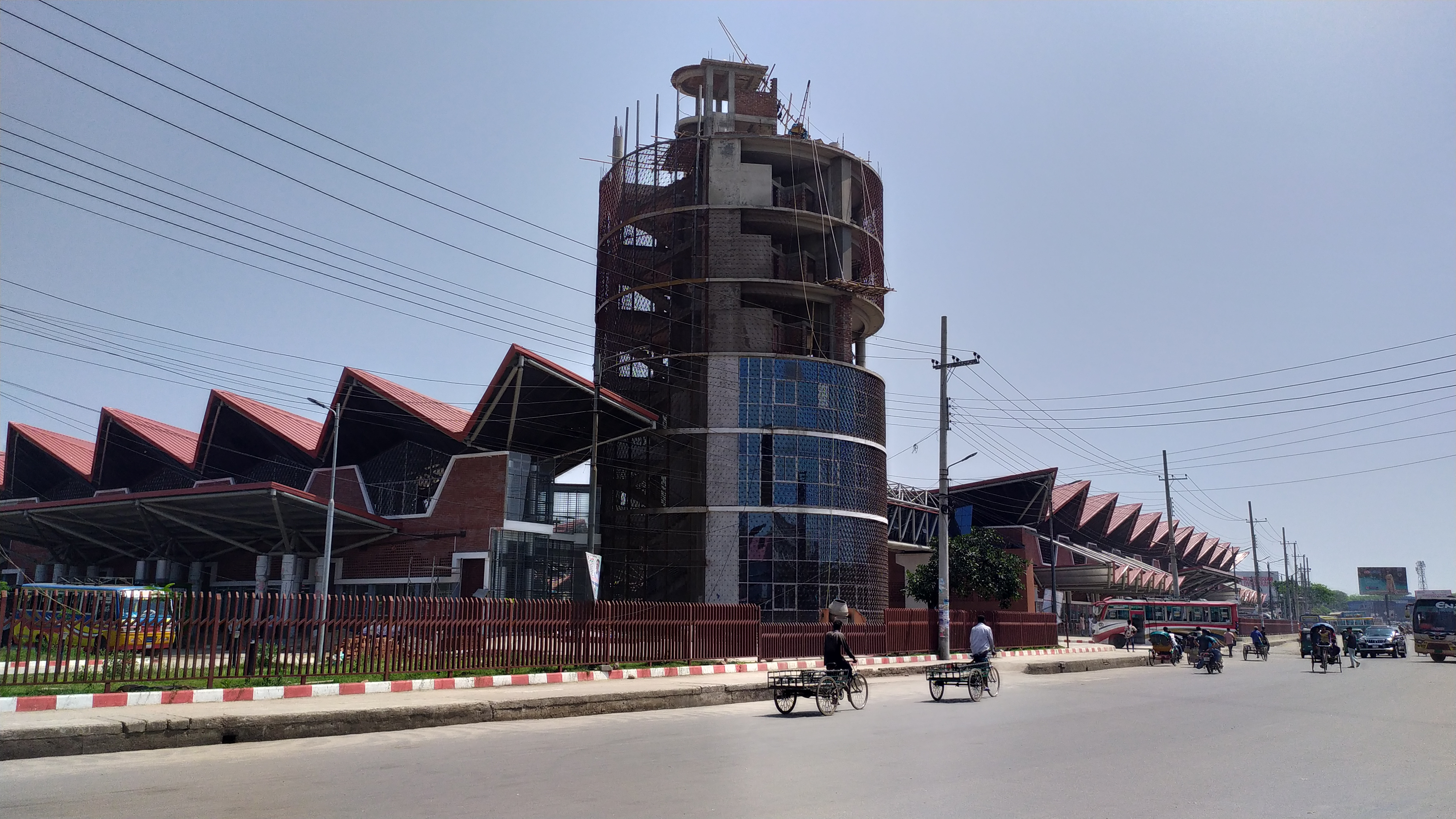

General information
- Other names: Kadamtali bus terminal
- Location: Kadamtali, Sylhet; Bangladesh
- Coordinates: 24°52′55″N 91°52′17″E
- Owner: Sylhet City Corporation

Construction
- Architect: Subrata Das, Robin Dey and Mohammad Jashim
- Architectural style: Assam-type

History
- Opened: Ready for opening

Services
Waiting lounge, Prayer room, Washrooms, Restaurants, Breastfeeding zones, Medical facilities
Location

Sylhet bus terminal is a modern bus terminal located in Kadamtali, Sylhet, which has been inaugurated on 2023. It is built with a blend of tradition and modernity. The bus terminal will be the most modern and attractive bus terminal in Bangladesh.

== Construction ==
The design of the bus terminal blends modern trends with local traditions – historic Assam-style houses and Ali Amjad's tower clock. Sylhet City Corporation (SCC) under Municipal Governance Service Project (MGSP) has constructed it on a six-acre land at a cost of around 63 crore taka with World Bank funding. Construction began in 2019, but construction was delayed by the pandemic. Architects Subrata Das, Robin Dey and Mohammad Jashim Uddin co-developed the infrastructure.

== Infrastructure ==
The entry and exit gates of the terminal have been constructed in accordance with those at airports. The terminal features a waiting lounge with a capacity for 1500 people. The entire terminal has been divided into three sections. The length of the departure building located in Part-1 is 350 feet, and arrival building located in Part-2 is around 300 feet long. The departure building has 48 bus bays including a large hall with 970 seats for passengers. It also has a 30-seat VIP room, 30 ticket counters, and a prayer room. Six washrooms have been built for men, women and handicapped people.

A multipurpose welfare center built in Part-3 at the rear of the terminal for meetings and programs for the drivers, support staffs and vehicle owners.

== See also ==
- Osmani International Airport
- Bangladesh Road Transport Corporation
