= Government Senior Secondary School =

Government Senior Secondary School may refer to:

- Government Senior Secondary School 31 P.S., Rajasthan, India
- Government Senior Secondary School Central Pendam, Sikkim, India
- Government Senior Secondary School Mamring East Sikkim, Sikkim, India
- Government Senior Secondary School, Nilokheri, Haryana, India

== See also ==
- Government Higher Secondary School (disambiguation)
- Government Higher Secondary Institute Botingoo, Jammu and Kashmir, India
