= Swarnappakshikal =

- Directed by: P. R. Nair
- Written by: Mani Muhammed
- Screenplay by: Mani Muhammed
- Produced by: Vasanthi
- Starring: Sukumaran; P. Sreekumar; Jose Prakash; Sukumari
- Cinematography: Divakara Menon
- Edited by: P. Raman Nair
- Music by: Raveendran
- Production company: Chinthu Films
- Distributed by: Chinthu Films
- Release date: 30 October 1981
- Country: India
- Language: Malayalam

Swarnappakshikal is a 1981 Indian Malayalam film, directed by P. R. Nair and produced by Vasanthi. The film stars Sukumari, Nedumudi Venu, Jose Prakash and Nagavally R. S. Kurup in the lead roles. The film has musical score by Raveendran.

== Cast ==
- Sukumaran
- P. Sreekumar
- Jose Prakash
- Nagavally R. S. Kurup
- Sukumari
- Alummoodan
- Jagannatha Varma
- Jalaja
- Leela Namboothiri
- Muralimohan
- Nellikode Bhaskaran
- M.M Fazal
- Swapna

== Soundtrack ==
The music was composed by Raveendran and the lyrics were written by Mullanezhi.

No.	Song	Singers	Lyrics	Length (m:ss)
1	"Devaangane Neeyee"	K. J. Yesudas	Mullanezhi	
2	"Kollam Kandaal Illam Venda"	P. Jayachandran, Chorus	Mullanezhi	
3	"Smrithikal Nizhalukal"	K. J. Yesudas	Mullanezhi	
4	"Thaamarappoovilayaalum"	S. Janaki	Mullanezhi	
