= N. P. Hafiz Mohamad =

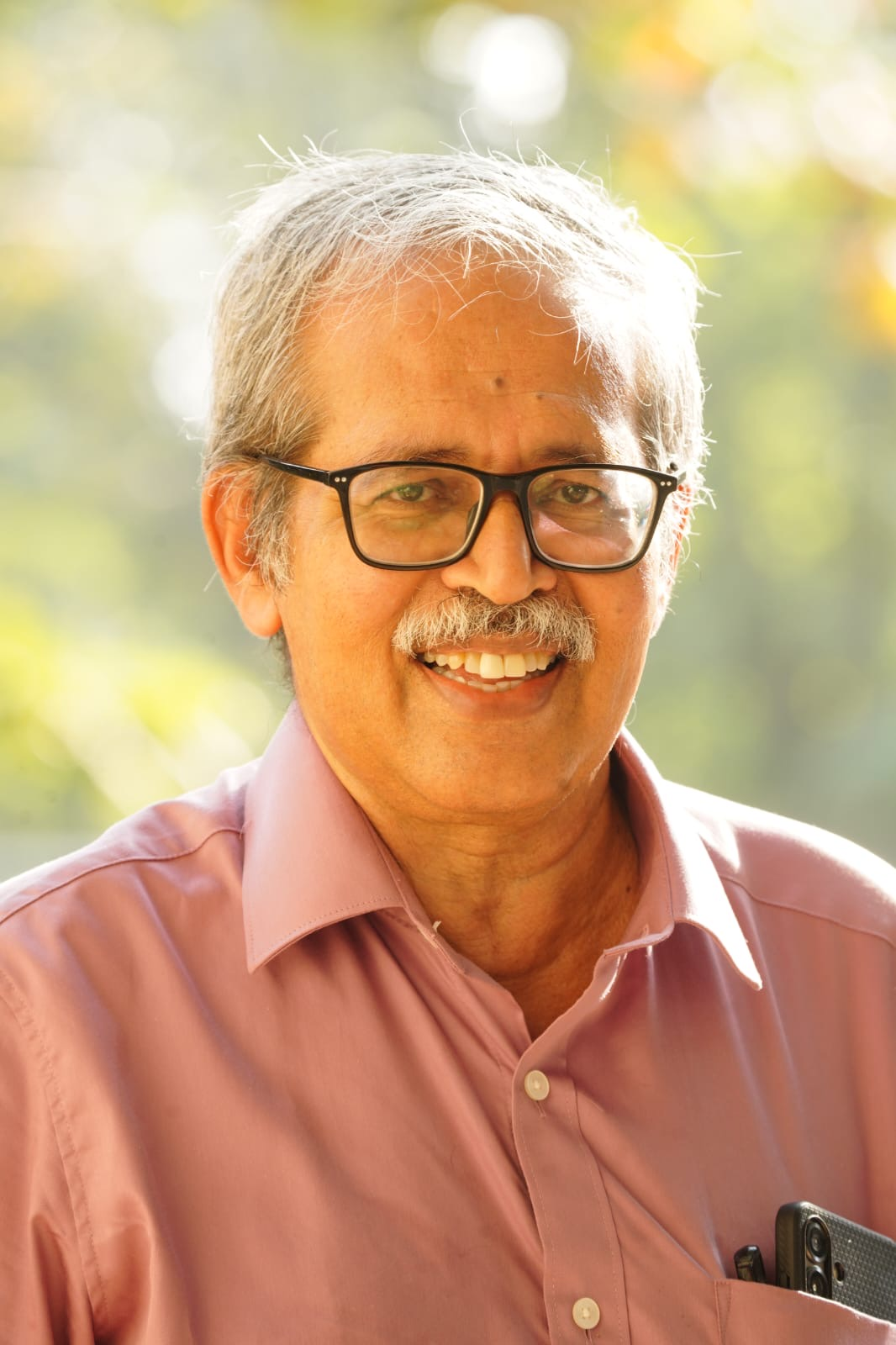
NP Hafiz Mohammed in 2026

N. P. Hafiz Mohamad is an Indian author, sociologist, social activist, and political commentator, living in Kerala.

Born in Calicut (16 July 1956) to celebrated Malayalam writer N. P. Mohammed, he had his early education in Calicut. He was trained early in the social problems of his society under his illustrious grandfather N. P. Abu Sahib, a famous freedom fighter in Malabar and a vociferous prohibition activist.

Hafiz Mohamad completed his post-graduation in sociology from Kerala University with 2nd rank and did his MPhil from Bangalore University. His doctoral thesis is on the matrilineal system among the Muslims of Malabar. He headed the Department Sociology at Farook College for three decades till his retirement in March 2011. He holds a Post Graduate Diploma in Mass Communication and Journalism from Mysore University and a Post Graduate Diploma in Counselling and Guidance from University of Kerala. He has done International Graduation in TCI(Theme Centered Interaction) from The Ruth Cohn Institute for TCI - Switzerland. He was a participant in the Fulbright September 2002 held at the BOISI Center at Boston College in the United States. He is the first recipient of MM Ghani Award for the Best Teacher in Calicut University.

He began his career in writing with the publication of Poovum Puzhayum (1988), a collection of short stories. He received an Edasseri Award for this work in the same year. Since then he has published a number of works and received many prestigious awards including Kendra Sahitya Akademi Award for Children's Literature the Kerala Sahitya Academy Award and Kerala Balasahitya Institute Award. He was editor of the Dubai based TAKE:1 magazine in 2016.

Short Story Big Fish by Hafiz Mohamed was included in the Literature and Contemporary issues textbook for BA/BSc by Calicut University in 2019.

On 24 July 2018, his first novel Espathinayiram was launched by the prominent Malayalam writer M. T. Vasudevan Nair in a program at K. P. Keshavamenon Hall, Calicut. This novel is about the myths and life in and around the coastal Kozhikode.

Writer Subhash Chandran released his novel 'Harmonium', a biographical fiction based on the life of music director M.S. Baburaj, in Kozhikode on December 16, 2023. It was published by mathrubhumi Books.

His other works include Poovum Puzhayum, Koottaksharam, Pranayadancharatthil, Cheriya Cheriya Meenukalum Valiya Malsyavum (Stories); Pravaasikalude Pusthakam, Manassinte Arogyam, Samoohathinte Arogyam, Paikkanum Pareeksha Ezhuthanum Padikkaam, Makkalude Padanam, Ramsan: Prasakthiyum Pradhanyavum, Keralatthile Muslim Sthreekalude Varthamana Kalam (Non Fiction); Thallakkurangum Pullippuliyum, Bahumaanyanaya Padusha, Kanakamalayile Nidhivetta, Arabinaatile Nadodikkathakal, Akashatthu Oru Adbudhayathra, Vellinilavinte Katha (Children's literature).

Along with his position at Farook College, he was an honorary director of the Suraksha De-Addiction and Counselling Centre where he helped hundreds of alcohol addicts and their families to escape their trauma and lead productive lives.

He has written and conducted workshops on issues affecting Indian expatriates in the Persian Gulf. He has also worked as a trainer and counsellor.
