= N. P. Mohammed =

Indian writer (1928–2003)

- Born: 1 July 1928; Koondungal, Kozhikode, Kerala, India
- Died: 3 January 2003 (aged 74); Kerala
- Occupations: Novelist, short story writer
- Spouse: Imbichi Pathumma
- Children: 7 children including N. P. Hafiz Mohamad
- Parents: N. P. Abu; Imbichi Pathumma
- Writing career
- Genre: Fiction
- Notable works: Arabi Ponnu; Maram; Hiranyakasipu; Daivathinte Kannu
- Notable awards: 1953 Government of Madras Award; 1970 Kerala Sahitya Akademi Award for Story; 1981 Kerala Sahitya Akademi Award for Novel; 1993 Kendra Sahitya Akademi Award; 1993 Samastha Kerala Sahithya Parishad Award; 1997 Lalithambika Antharjanam Award; 2000 Padmaprabha Literary Award; 2001 Muttathu Varkey Award; C. V. Raman Pillai Award; Padmanabha Swami Puraskaram

N. P. Mohammed (1 July 1928 – 3 January 2003), popularly known by his initials N. P., was an Indian novelist, short story writer and screenwriter of Malayalam language. Along with his contemporaries like M. T. Vasudevan Nair, O. V. Vijayan, Kakkanadan, and Madhavikutty, he was known to have been one of the pioneers of modernist movement in Malayalam fiction. He was the president of Kerala Sahitya Akademi and a recipient of several awards including Kendra Sahitya Akademi Award, Kerala Sahitya Akademi Award for Story, Kerala Sahitya Akademi Award for Novel, Lalithambika Antharjanam Award, Padmaprabha Literary Award and the Muttathu Varkey Award.

== Biography ==
N. P. Mohammed was born on 1 July 1928 at Koondungal, in the present-day Kozhikode district of the south Indian state of Kerala to N. P. Abu, a freedom fighter, and Imbichi Pathumma Beevi. N. P. Moideen, a noted politician and a member of Kerala Legislative Assembly, was his brother. Mohammed did his schooling at the local school in Koondungal, Basel Mission School, Parappanangadi, and Ganapathi School, Kozhikode before completing his college education at Zamorin's Guruvayurappan College. He started his career as a clerk at a co-operative society but soon moved to the Housing Board Co-operative Society, Kozhikode where he served for the next three decades before superannuating from service as its secretary. He served as the resident editor of Kerala Kaumudi and was associated with a number of publications such as Navasahithi, Nireekshanam, Gopuram, Pradeepam and Jagratha where he served as the member of their editorial boards.

Mohammed was married to Imbichi Pathumma, the marriage taking place in 1952 and the couple had seven children, including the writer and academic N. P. Hafiz Mohamad. Mohammed died on 3 January 2003, at the age of 74, succumbing to pneumonia at a private hospital in Kozhikode. His mortal remains were laid to rest at Kannamparambu Kabarstan, in the presence of his friends and dignitaries including M. T. Vasudevan Nair, U. A. Khader, P. Valsala, K. T. Mohammed, Sukumar Azhikode, M. M. Basheer, P. V. Gangadharan and U. K. Kumaran.

== Legacy ==
Mohammed was known to have been among the group of writers such as M. T. Vasudevan Nair, O. V. Vijayan, Kakkanadan, and Kamala Das who pioneered modernist movement in Malayalam fiction in the 1950s. His oeuvre comprises eight novels, ten short story anthologies and a number of other books. He co-wrote one his novels, Arabi Ponnu (The Arab Gold), with M. T. Vasudevan Nair; it was reported that both writers stayed together in a rented house in Karuvarakkundu village, Kozhikode for a period of two weeks to complete the work. The novel Hiranyakasipu, which tells us a story of power and politics, brings characters from Hindu mythology into a modern political setting in Kerala. His last work, Muhammad Abdurrahman, a fictional biography on the life of the noted Indian independence activist, Mohammed Abdur Rahiman, was found as manuscript after his death and was published posthumously. Three of his stories were adapted into films, Maram, Maanyamahaajanangale and Veeraputhran of which he wrote dialogues for two and screenplay for one.

Mohammed served as the president of the Kerala Sahitya Akademi from 2001 until his death in 2003. Prior to that, he was a member of the governing council of the Akademi and was a member of the Kerala Sangeetha Nataka Akademi, Kendra Sahitya Akademi and the Central Board of Film Certification. He was one of the founder members of the Islam and Modern Age Society, and was the translator of Islam Between East and West, written by Alija Izetbegović.

== Awards and honours ==
Mohammed received his first major award for his first novel, Thoppiyum Chattavum, in 1953 from the Government of Madras when Malabar was a part of the state of Madras. The Kerala Sahitya Akademi chose his short story anthology, Presidentinte Adyathe Maranam, for their annual award for story in 1970. A decade later, Akademi honoured him again with the Kerala Sahitya Akademi Award for Novel in 1981 for the novel, Ennappadam. He received the Kendra Sahitya Akademi Award in 1993 for his work, Daivathinte Kannu' the same year as he received the Samastha Kerala Sahithya Parishad Award. In 1997, he was selected for the Lalithambika Antharjanam Smaraka Sahitya Award followed by the Padmaprabha Literary Award in 2000 and the Muttathu Varkey Award in 2001. He was also a recipient of the Padmanabha Swami Puraskaram and the C. V. Raman Pillai Award for his non-fiction work, Veera Rasam CV Krithikalil.

== List of works ==
=== Novels ===
- Mohammed, N. P. (1968). Maram. Kottayam: S.P.C.S.
- Vasudevan Nair, M. T.; Mohammed, N. P. (1960). Arabi Ponnu. Kottayam: DC Books.
- Mohammed, N. P. (1990). Daivathinte kannu. Kottayam: S.P.C.S.
- Mohammed, N. P. (2000). Hiranyakashipu. Kottayam: DC Books. ISBN 9788126401031.
- Mohammed, N. P. (2000). Kalippanees. Kottayam: DC Books.
- Mohammed, N. P. (1992). Pinneyum ennappatam. Kottayam: DC Books.
- Mohammed, N. P. (1979). Thankavathil. Kottayam: S.P.C.S.
- Mohammed, N. P. (1980). Ennappadam. Kottayam: S.P.C.S.
- Mohammed, N. P. (1979). Thankavathil. Kottayam: S.P.C.S.
- Mohammed, N. P. (2004). Mohammed Abdul Rahman-Oru Novel. ASIN B007E4XWRI.

=== Short story collections ===
- Mohammed, N. P. (1988). Mezhukuthirikal. Calicut: Malayalam publications.
- Mohammed, N. P. (1957). Maranam tharattupaadi. S.P.C.S.
- Mohammed, N. P. (2002). N P Muhammadinte kathakal. Kottayam: DC Books. ISBN 9788126405541.
- Mohammed, N. P. (2003). Ente priyappetta kathakal. Kottayam: DC Books. ISBN 9788126406029.
- Mohammed, N. P. (1969). Prasidhandinte aadyathe maranam. Kottayam: National Book Stall.

=== Essays ===
- Mohammed, N. P. (1996). Manthahasathinte mouna rodanam. Kottayam: DC Books.
- Mohammed, N. P. (1989). Thamara nool. Calicut: Malayalam Publications.
- Mohammed, N. P. (1981). Manushyakam. Kottayam: S.P.C.S.
- Mohammed, N. P. (2006). N P yude Thiranjedutha Lekhanangal. Thrissur: Kerala Sahitya Akademi.
- Mohammed, N. P. (2007). Indian muslingalum secularisavum. Calicut: Mathrubhumi.
- Mohammed, N. P. (2007). Ulvelicham. Calicut: Mathrubhumi. ISBN 9788182643239.
- Mohammed, N. P. (1988). Veerarasam: C V Kruthikalil. Kottayam: Current Books.
- Mohammed, N. P. (1989). Mandahaasathinte maunarodanam. Kottayam: DC Books.

=== Poetry ===
- Mohammed, N. P. (1969). Kavithakal, Variyellukal. Thrissur: Current Books.

=== Children's literature ===
- Mohammed, N. P. (1986). Avar naalu per. Kottayam: S.P.C.S.

=== Translation ===
- Begovic, Alija Izetbegović (1998). Islaam raajamaargam. Translated by Mohammed, N. P. Calicut: Islamic Publishing House. ISBN 9788172044718.
- Guy de Maupassant; O. Henry; Katherine Mansfield; Franz Kafka; et al. (2006). Lokakatha. Translated by Vasudevan Nair, M. T.; Mohammed, N. P. Thrissur: Current Books. ISBN 9788187474807.

Year	Film	Contribution	Reference

== See also ==
- List of Malayalam-language authors by category
- List of Malayalam-language authors
