= Central Pendam =

- Town
- Nickname: Pandam
- Interactive map of Central Pendam
- Coordinates: 27.205°N 88.563°E
- Country: India
- State: Sikkim
- District: Pakyong
- Tehsil: Gangtok
- Gram Panchayat: Central Pendam GPU

Area
  - Total: 10,026 ha (24,770 acres)
- Elevation: 1,600–2,000 m (5,200–6,600 ft)
- Time zone: UTC+5.30 (Indian Standard Time)

Central Pendam is a village located in Pakyong district of Sikkim, India.

== Demographics ==
According to the 2011 Indian census, the average sex ratio of the village is 966 which is higher than the Sikkim state average of 890.

== Administration ==
A sarpanch is the administrative head of the village and representative of the town, according to the Constitution of India and Panchayati Raj Act.

== Education ==
Government Senior Secondary School Central Pendam is located in Central Pendam

== Banking facilities ==
Indian Overseas Bank operates a branch at Central Pendam.
