= Velayudhan Panikkassery =

Indian historian (1930–2024)

- Born: 30 March 1930; Engandiyur, British India
- Died: 20 September 2024 (aged 94); Engandiyur, Thrissur district, Kerala, India
- Occupation: Historian
- Children: 3
- Writing career
- Genres: History, History of Kerala
- Notable awards: Kerala Sahitya Akademi Award for Overall Contributions

Velayudhan Panikkassery (30 March 1930 – 20 September 2024) was an Indian historian from Kerala. He has written 66 books, most of which describe the history of Kerala. He received many awards, including Kerala Sahitya Akademi Award for Overall Contributions.

== Biography ==
Velayudhan Panikassery was born on 30 March 1934, as the son of Panikassery Mamu and Kalikutty at Engandiyur, Thrissur district.

He and his wife, retired teacher V.K. Leela, have three children, Shaji, Chinta, and Veena. Velayudhan Panikkassery died on 20 September 2024, at the age of 94, at Engandiyur in Thrissur district.

== Career ==
Panikassery joined the Engandiyoor Branch Library of the Malabar Local Library Authority as a librarian in 1956 and retired from there in 1991.

He served as the vice president and secretary of the administrative committee of the Sahithya Pravarthaka Co-operative Society. He also served as the chairman of the Engandiyur Deendayal Trust and the manager of Saraswati Vidyaniketan Central School.

== Contributions ==
Panikassery has written 66 books describing the history of Kerala and its foreign invasions. Panikassery has also received a fellowship from the Central Department of Culture to conduct research on ancient Kerala's foreign relations and the influence of foreigners on Kerala art and culture. In 1963, his book 'Keranlam Pathinanjum Pathinarum Noottandukalil', which chronicles the history of Kerala in the fifteenth and sixteenth centuries, became a textbook at the University of Kerala. Including this, 12 of his books are now textbooks in various government universities in Kerala. Some of his works have also been translated into Tamil and Hindi languages.

He has repeatedly mentioned that the old coins in his father's collection, who was a merchant, his extensive reading, and his friendship with Kesari A. Balakrishna Pillai from his school days, all of these led him to write history. An article by Panikassery was first printed in 1955, which was a short biography of Thakazhi Sivashankara Pillai, published in the Pune Malayali Special Edition. He had initially written two columns in the Janayugam weekly, which were short biography of Malayalam writers. These articles were later collected under the title 'Karoor Muthal Kovilan Vare [From Karoor to Kovilan]'.

Velayudhan Panikassery had researched and discovered deeply the history of South India, especially the history of the Deccan region. He researched and discovered how the Tamil language and culture, which had existed since ancient, Vedic times, had deeply influenced the social life of South India.

He has also written books on biographies, children's literature and folklore. He also published a magazine called 'Taliola'. His last published book was about the history of Chettuva, titled 'Charithram urangunna Chettuvayum Chettuva Parikuttyum'.

== Notable books ==
- Keralacharithram: Kerala Samsthana Roopeekaranam Vare [History of Kerala up to the formation of Modern Kerala State] (in Malayalam). DC Books. 2023. ISBN 9789357320351.
- Samskarangalum Samrajyangalum Kalaghattangaliloote. DC Books. 2016. ISBN 9788124020777., a book that simply describes the history of life, from the origin of living things and the evolution of man to the present day.
- Sindhu Nadeethadasamsklaravum Pracheena Bharathile Sarvakalashalakalum [Indus Valley Civilization and Universities in Ancient India]. NBS (National Book Stall). 2023. ISBN 9788119144792.
- Kerala Charitram Thiruthikkuricha Mahasambhavangal [Events that changed the history of Kerala]. DC Books. 2020. ISBN 9789353902827. A book that tells the main events that changed the history of Kerala.
- Nalanda Thakshasila. DC Books. 2016. ISBN 9788124020647.. A book on Universities in Ancient India.
- Sancharikal kanda Keralam [Kerala, as seen by the travellers]. DC Books. 2017. ISBN 9788124010532. The content of this book is the accounts of fifty-two prominent travelers who visited Kerala from the fourth century BC to recent times.
- Pracheena Keralathinte Vanigya Bandhangal [Trade relations of ancient Kerala]. DC Books. 2018. ISBN 9789352823918.
- Kerala Charithra Padanangal [Studies of Kerala History] (in Malayalam). DC Books. 2007. ISBN 978-81-240-0584-2.
- Anayatha Deepangal. DC Books. 2013. ISBN 9788124019412. This book introduces ten great personalities who have achieved success in different fields.
- Keralam 600 Kollam Munp [Kerala, 600 years back] (in Malayalam). DC Books. 2017. ISBN 9788124004937.
- Keralolpathy [Origin of Kerala]. DC Books. 2018. ISBN 978-8124018200.
- Arattupuzha Velayudha Panicker. Current Books. 2018. ISBN 9788124020982. Biography of Arattupuzha Velayudha Panicker.
- Ayyankali Muthal VT Vare [From Ayyankali to VT]. DC Books. 2007. ISBN 978-8124013014. A work that introduces a few renaissance leaders who fought against the social mores that prevailed in Kerala in the late 19th and early 20th centuries.
- Ibnu Bathutha Kanda Keralam [Kerala as seen by Ibn Battuta] (in Malayalam). DC Books. 2015. ISBN 978-8124018750.

== Awards and honors ==
He received awards Kerala Sahitya Akademi Award for Overall Contributions, the Center for Historical Studies Award, V.S. Keraliyan Award, P.A. Seythumuhammed Memorial Award, N.K. Foundation Award and Sree Narayana Guru Award 2013 from Sree Narayna Sahithya Parishath (SNSP).
