= Unnikrishnan Puthur =

Indian writer (1933–2014)

- ഉണ്ണിക്കൃഷ്ണൻ പുതൂർ
- Born: July 20, 1933; Engandiyur, Trichur, Kingdom of Cochin
- Died: April 2, 2014 (aged 80); Chavakkad, Kerala, India
- Occupation: Writer
- Writing career
- Language: Malayalam
- Notable awards: Kerala Sahitya Akademi Award; Odakkuzhal Award

Unnikrishnan Puthur (20 July 1933 – 2 April 2014) was a Malayalam–language novelist and short story writer. Puthur wrote about 700 short stories and published 29 collections of short stories, 15 novels, a collection of poems and autobiographical writings, among others. He was awarded Kerala Sahitya Akademi Award for the novel Balikkallu in 1968. He received the Odakkuzhal Award in the year 2010 for the book Anubhavangalude Ner Rekhakal.

== Life ==
Born in the village of Engandiyur, in Thrissur district of Kerala, as the son of Kallat Chulliparambil Sankunni Nair and Puthur Janaki Amma, Unnikrishnan Puthur studied at the Chavakkad Board School and Government Victoria College, Palakkad. He started his career in college and parallelly worked as a newspaper correspondent for two years, then joined the Guruvayur Sreekrishna temple Devaswom office as a clerk and retired as head of the establishment wing of the Guruvayur Devaswom Library in the year 1987. He was a trade union leader and a socialist. He was nominated to the Temple Managing Committee as the representative of the temple employees.

He also served as the president of the Sahitya Pravarthaka Cooperative Society, member of the executive committee of the Kerala Sahitya Akademi and the general council of the Kerala Sangeetha Nataka Akademi, and founder-member of the editorial committee of Bhakthapriya magazine.

He died on 2 April 2014 at Raja hospital in Chavakkad, a town near his hometown, aged 80. He had been undergoing treatment for age-related ailments for quite some time. He was cremated with full state honours at the premises of his home in Guruvayur.

== Writing ==
His works include Jalasamadhi, Dharmachakram, Gajarajan Guruvayur Kesavan, Puthurinte Kathakal, Thallaviral, Akashavani, Kuttasammatam, Atmaviboothi, Aanappaka, Amruthamadhanam, Karayunna Kalpadukal, Nashtapetta Ponnonam, Kamsan, Dylan Thomasinte Ganam, Sundari Cheriamma, and Kalpakapoomazha (collection of poems).

His novels and scores of short stories narrated the tales of ordinary men and women bound to the famous Guruvayur temple, unnoticed in the hustle and bustle of the pilgrim town visited by thousands from outside. It was his novels like Balikkallu and Anappaka that brought to light the plight of men and women destined to eke out a living by doing menial chores for the rich temples, as mahouts and charwomen. Nazhikamani records the rituals and life around Guruvayur temple, where he worked for 32 years. Balikkallu too emerged from this experience. Aattukattil documents the growth and break-up of the Nair tharavad (ancestral house) in the feudal era. Panchara Mavu Veenu, Bhagam, Ozhivudinam, Gopuravelicham, Eeeranmundum Nananja Kannukalum, Nakshatrakunju, Pavakkalyanam, and Kadinjool Prasanam too are set in the matrilineal Nair milieu. Puthur writes about the complexities of life in a simple style. There are echoes of Kesavadev and Ponkunnam Varkey in his writings. Puthur's troubling remarks about Malayalam author Rajalakshmi in his memoirs written in Mathrubhumi Weekly had stirred a huge controversy in Kerala literary circles.

== Bibliography ==
=== Novels ===
- Rescue Shelter (Trichur: Current Books, 1967)
- Balikkallu (Kottayam: SPCS, 1968)
- Manasse Santhamakoo (Kottayam: SPCS, 1968)
- Aattukattil (Kottayam: SPCS, 1970)
- Aanappaka (Kottayam: SPCS, 1976)
- Pavakkinavu (Kottayam: DC Books, 1976)
- Vidhi Chakram (Kottayam: SPCS, 1978)
- Amrutamathanam (Kottayam: SPCS, 1981)
- Indra Kalpana (Kottayam: SPCS, 1982)
- Kuthira Vela (Kottayam: Current Books, 1985)
- Vadiya Chembakapookkal (Kottayam: Current Books, 1985)
- Marakkanum Porukkanum (Kottayam: SPCS, 1989)
- Mrithyu Yathra (Cochin: Poompatta, 1989)
- Nazhikamani (Kottayam: SPCS, 1990)
- Athmaviboothi (Kottayam: Current Books, 2001)
- Jalasamadhi (Kottayam: DC Books, 2003)

=== Short story collections ===
- Kettu Pinanja Jivita Bandham (Palghat: Modern, 1956)
- Vedanakalum Swapnangalum (Kottayam: SPCS, 1957)
- Premavum Vairupyavum (Calicut: P. K. Brothers, 1960)
- Dylan Thomasinte Ganam (Kottayam: SPCS, 1961)
- Nidra Viheenangalaya Rathrikal (Kottayam: Manorama, 1961)
- Snehadarangalode (Kottayam: SPCS, 1962)
- Oru Devalayathinu Chuttum (Trichur: Current Books, 1963)
- Sundari Cheryemma (Kottayam: SPCS, 1964)
- Charamavaranam (Trichur: Current Books, 1965)
- Nakshatra Kunhu (Kottayam: SPCS, 1966)
- Gopura Velicham (Kottayam: SPCS, 1967)
- Akashavani (Kottayam: NBS, 1967)
- Echumoppol (Kottayam: SPCS, 1968)
- Chathuppu Nilam (Kottayam: SPCS, 1969)
- Nee Thannu Nee Thiricheduthu (Kottayam: NBS, 1969)
- Kuttasammatham (The Confession) (Kottayam: SPCS, 1970)
- Utsavam (Children's stories)
- Makante Bhagyam (Kottayam: SPCS, 1972)
- Aswastatayude Chirakadi (Kottayam: SPCS, 1974)
- Thiranjedutha Kathakal (Kottayam: SPCS, 1975)
- Pallakkinte Saapam (Kottayam: SPCS, 1977)
- Vicharana (Kottayam: SPCS, 1980)
- Bhaga Pathram (Kottayam: SPCS, 1980)
- Nashtapetta Ponnonam (Kottayam: SPCS, 1986)
- Puthur Kathakal (Calicut: Mathrubhumi, 1987)
- Annadana Prabhu (Kottayam: SPCS, 1991)
- Ellam Daivathinte Kayyil (Kottayam: SPCS, 1991)
- Ente Nootonnu Kathakal (Calicut: Mathrubhumi, 1996)
- Kamsan (Kottayam: DC Books, 1996)
- Kazhchakalkappuram (Kottayam: DC Books, 1999)
- Dharmachakram (Kottayam: DC Books, 2002)
- Kalathinte Kali (Calicut: Mathrubhumi, 2003)
- Thallaviral (Calicut: Mathrubhumi, 2006)
- Anubhavangalude Ner Rekhakal (Trichur: Kerala Sahitya Akademi, 2009)

=== Others ===
- Kalpaka Poomazha (Kottayam: SPCS, 1985, collection of 38 poems, with an introduction by Vyloppilli Sreedhara Menon)
- Guruvayurappante Kunnikurumala (Kottayam: SPCS, 1981, spiritual literature)
- Gajarajan Guruvayur Kesavan (Kottayam: SPCS, 1989)
