= M. Achuthan =

Indian academic (1930–2017)

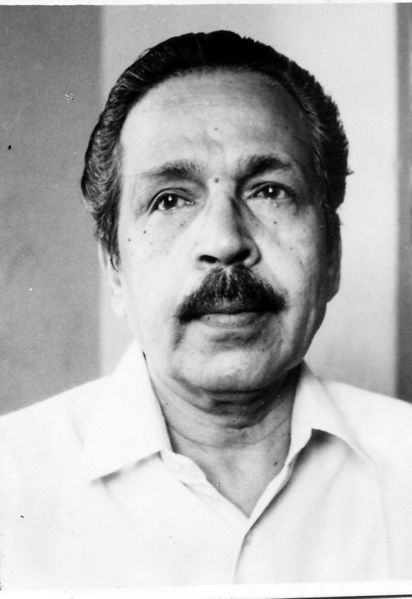
- Photo published in Malayalam Sarvavignana Kosam
- Born: 15 June 1930; Vadama, Thrissur, Kerala, India
- Died: 9 April 2017 (aged 86); Ernakulam, Kerala
- Education: St. Antony's Higher Secondary School, Mala; Maharaja's College, Ernakulam; University of Madras
- Occupations: Literary critic; orator
- Spouse: Radha
- Children: Three daughters
- Parents: Alakkattu Narayana Menon (father); Mukkuttiparambil Parukutty Amma (mother)
- Awards: 1976 Kerala Sahitya Akademi Award for Literary Criticism; 1998 Padmaprabha Literary Award; 2001 Kerala Sahitya Akademi Award for Overall Contributions

Mukkuttiparambil Achuthan (15 June 1930 – 9 April 2017) was an Indian academic, orator, and literary critic of Malayalam literature. Known for his works viz. Swathanthrya Samaravum Malayala Sahithyavum, Paschathya Sahitya Darshanam and Cherukadha Innale Innu, Achuthan was a recipient of several literary honours including the Kerala Sahitya Akademi Award for Literary Criticism and for Overall Contributions as well as the Padmaprabha Literary Award.

== Biography ==
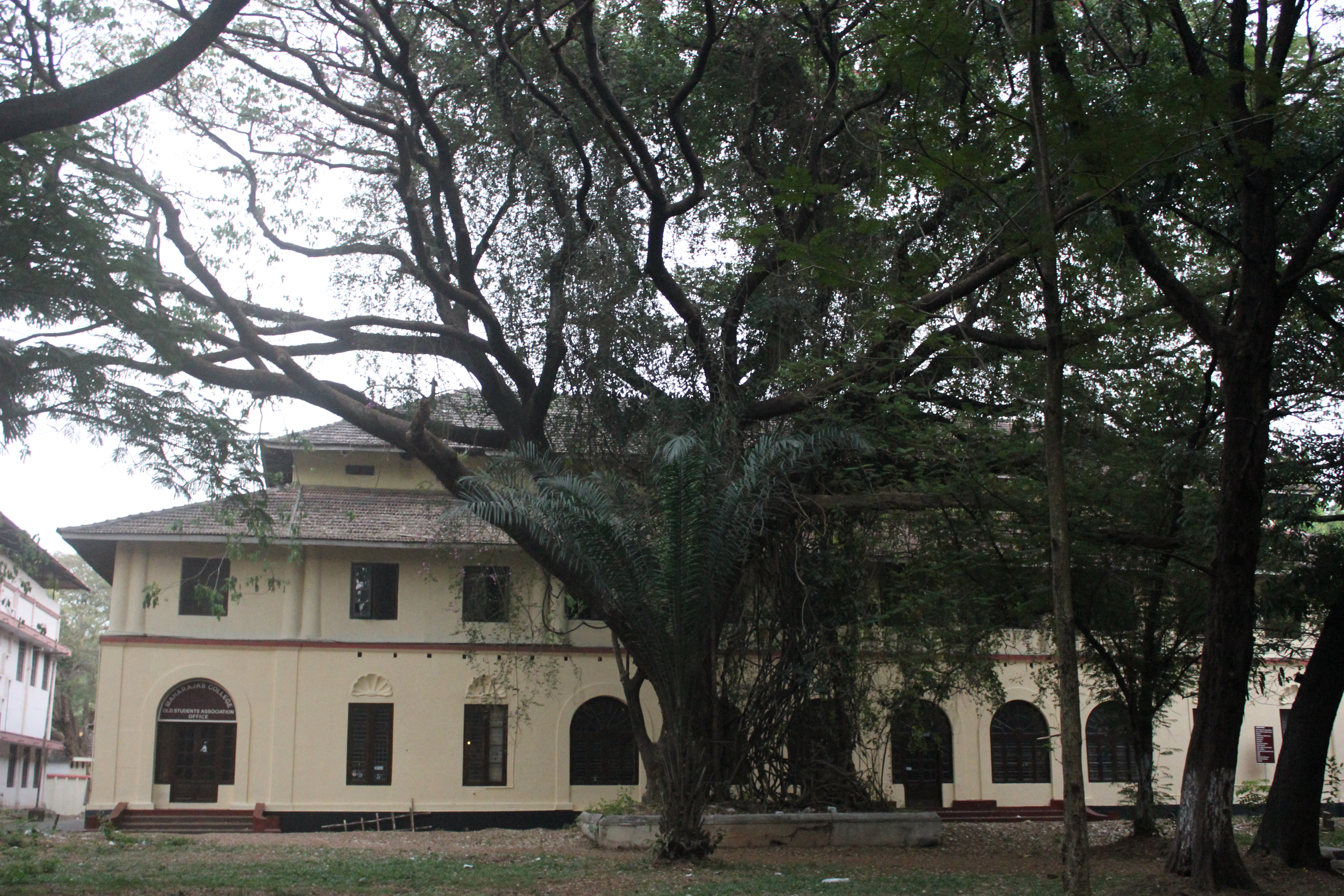
Maharaja's College, Ernakulam, where Achuthan studied and worked

M. Achuthan was born on 15 June 1930 at Vadama, a small hamlet near Mala, in Thrissur district of the south Indian state of Kerala to Alakkattu Narayana Menon and Mukkuttiparambil Parukutty Amma. His schooling was at St. Antony’s High School, Mala after which he joined Maharaja's College, Ernakulam to earn a master's degree in Malayalam literature with gold medal from the University of Madras. Subsequently, he started his career as a lecturer of Malayalam at St. Albert's College. He also worked at a number of other institutions such as Government College, Meenchantha, Government Victoria College, Palakkad and Sree Neelakanta Government Sanskrit College Pattambi before serving his alma mater, Maharaja's College, Ernakulam, from where he retired from service as a professor. Post retirement, he continued his academic career as a visiting professor at Sree Sankaracharya University of Sanskrit and sat in the director board of Sahithya Pravarthaka Co-operative Society. He also served as a member of the executive panel of Kerala Sahitya Akademi and the academic councils of the Universities of Kerala and Calicut, managed Mathrubhumi publications and presided Samastha Kerala Sahitya Parishad.

Achuthan was married to Radha, daughter of Jnanpith award winning poet, G. Sankara Kurup and the couple had three daughters, B. Bhadra, Nandini and Nirmala; Bhadra would later become the deputy Mayor of the Corporation of Kochi. He died on 9 April 2017, aged 86, at a private hospital in Kochi, succumbing to age related illnesses. His mortal remains were cremated at Ravipuram crematorium.

== Legacy and honours ==
Achuthan started his literary career by challenging the views of established literary figures like Kuttikrishna Marar and Joseph Mundassery and was the first critic to write on the poetry of Edasseri Govindan Nair. He authored a number of books including Paschathya Sahitya Dharshanam, a critique of the philosophies of a number of western scholars. Cherukadha Innale Innu, published in 1973, is a book that covers the history of Malayalam short story and short story writers. Kavithayuṃ Kalavuṃ, Samanvayaṃ, Novel - Prashnangalum Padangalum, Vivechanam, Vimarshalochanam, Nirdharanam, Swathanthrya Samaravum Malayala Sahithyavum, Prakaranangal Prathikarangal and Vangmukham are some of his other works. He also translated One Thousand and One Nights into Malayalam under the title, Ayirathonnu Raavukal.

Achuthan received the Kerala Sahitya Akademi Award for Literary Criticism in 1976 for his work, Cherukadha Innale Innu, followed by Padmaprabha Literary Award in 1998. Kerala Sahitya Akademi honoured him again in 2001 with the award for overall contributions. He was also a recipient of the Sahitya Pravarthaka Benefit Fund Award.

== Bibliography ==
=== Essays ===
- M. Achuthan (1962). Paschathya Sahithya Darshanam. Sāhityapr̲avartaka Sahakaraṇasaṅghaṃ.
- M. Achuthan (1965). Kavitayuṃ Kālavuṃ: upanyāsaṅgaḷ. Sāhityapr̲avartaka Sahakaraṇasaṅghaṃ.
- M. Achuthan (1969). Samanvayaṃ.
- Achuthan, M. (1971). Vivechanam. Current Books.
- Achuthan, M (1979). Kattil Parathiya Sanmargam.
- Achuthan, M. (1980). Vangmukham. Kozhikode: Poorna.
- Achuthan, M. (1994). Swaathanthryasamaravum malayalasaahithyavum. Thrissur: Kerala Sahitya Academy.
- M. Achuthan (2007). Cherukadha Innale Innu. DC Books. ISBN 978-81-264-1513-7.
- M. Achuthan (2010). Novel - Prashnangalum Padangalum. DC Books. ISBN 978-8126433919.

=== Translations ===
- Achuthan, M., ed. (2011). Ayirathonnu Ravukal (2nd ed.). Kozhikode: Mathrubhumi Books. ISBN 9788182650978.

== See also ==
- List of Malayalam-language authors by category
- List of Malayalam-language authors
