= Punnamoodu =

- village
- Location in Kerala, India Punnamoodu (India)
- Coordinates: 8°25′0″N 77°0′0″E
- Country: India
- State: Kerala
- District: Thiruvananthapuram

Government
  - Body: Gram panchayat

Population (2001)
  - Total: 36,836

Languages
  - Official: Malayalam, English
- Time zone: UTC+5:30 (IST)
- PIN: 695020
- Vehicle registration: KL-

Punnamoodu is a village in Thiruvananthapuram district in the state of Kerala, India. The Government Model Higher Secondary School, Punnamoodu is one of the oldest schools in Thiruvananthapuram District, Kerala, India. It was established in 1915. Substation of KSEB for the region is located at punnamoodu as well.The places near by punnamoodu are Keleswaram, Kalliyoor and Balaramapuram . Balaramapuram is other famous place near by punnamoodu, known as the centre for the production of traditional varieties of handloom textiles meant for the contemporary cloth wearing style of Kerala. Its unique craftsmanship makes it an ideal heirloom.

== Demographics ==
As of 2001 India census, Kalliyoor had a population of 36836 with 18176 males and 18660 females. Kailas nagar is a housing colony in punnamoodu
