= P. K. Ittoop =

Indian politician

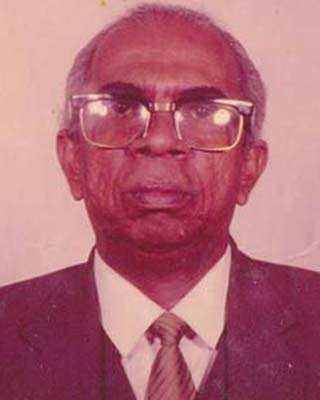
- Ex.MLA and Adv P. K. Ittoop

Member of the Kerala Legislative Assembly
- In office 1977 – 1980
- In office 1980 – 1982
- Constituency: Chalakudy

Personal details
- Born: 8 December 1930 Chalakudy, Kingdom of Cochin
- Died: 19 March 1998 (aged 67) Willingdon Island, Ernakulam
- Party: Kerala Congress
- Spouse: Regina
- Children: 6

Palamattath Kuttiyil Ittoop (8 December 1930 – 19 March 1998) was an Indian politician and a founding member of the Kerala Congress party, which was established in 1964. He was the first MLA from Chalakudy in the Kerala Legislative Assembly after the formation of the state of Kerala.

He represented the Chalakudy Constituency in the Kerala Legislative Assembly during the Fifth and Sixth Assembly from 1977 to 1979 and from 1980 to 1982 respectively.

== Early life ==
Ittoop was born as the only son to Shri Kochuvareed and Mathri of Palamattath Kuttiyil family in Chalakudy on 8 December 1930. He completed his schooling from Government Model Higher Secondary School for Boys. He graduated with bachelors degree from St. Joseph's College, Tiruchirappalli, Tamil Nadu. He later pursued his Law degree from Government Law College, Ernakulam.

== Political career ==
=== Indian National Congress ===
P. K. Ittoop began his political career in the Indian National Congress in 1954. He was politically and socially involved in Thrissur and particularly his hometown Chalakudy.

=== Kerala Congress ===
In 1964, he was part of the breakaway faction led by K. M. George and R. Balakrishna Pillai who left Indian National Congress to form Kerala Congress. The party was primarily active in central Kerala during the late 60s and he was an integral part in building its foundation in Thrissur & Ernakulam Districts drawing its main support from the Syrian Christians and the Nair community of Central and Southern Kerala.

=== Formation of Chalakudy taluk ===
On 28 January 1970, as President of the Chalakudy taluk Roopikarana Committee, he, along with Secretary P. T. Sankaran Embranthiri, petitioned the government for the formation of Chalakudy taluk.

=== Legislative Assembly ===
He contested and won the Chalakudy Assembly Constituency in the 1977 Kerala Elections by a margin of 7613 votes representing Kerala Congress (KCP). In 1980, being part of KC (M) who joined the pre-poll alliance - LDF, he won the Chalakudy Constituency for the second time in the 1980 Kerala Elections. But in 1982, after Kerala Congress (M) moved away from LDF to join the United Democratic Front Ittoop lost the Chalakudy Constituency to K. J George of JNL Party.

== Personal life ==
He was married to Regina Ittoop and is survived by 2 daughters and 4 sons. He died on 19 March 1998 after battling pneumonia while at Cochin Port Trust Hospital.

== Contributions ==
=== Education ===
He was a pioneer to bring educational and cultural institutions in and around Chalakudy and upheld the development of the Chalakudy Town. He was the founding member of many educational institutions like Carmel Higher Secondary School, Chalakudy, Sacred Heart College Chalakudy and other centres in the town.

=== Positions held ===
- Chairman of BDC, Chalakudy for 5 Years
- District President of Kerala Congress, Thrissur
- District President of Chalakudy Bar Association
- Member of Kerala Congress State Committee

== Awards ==
- Every year since 2010, the P.K. Ittoop Memorial Award is given to an eligible citizen in terms of social, economic, political, educational and cultural contributions to the community.

Various personalities have won this awards over the years like Innocent.

- His contributions to education are commemorated through an endowment in his honor at Sacred Heart College, Chalakudy, awarded to the best student in B.Sc. Physics.
