= Education in Assam =

Assam is a state in northeastern India. In 2024, the literacy rate of Assam was estimated to be 72.19% (77.85% male and 66.27% female). The literacy rate of Assam is slightly below the national average of 74.04%.

== General ==
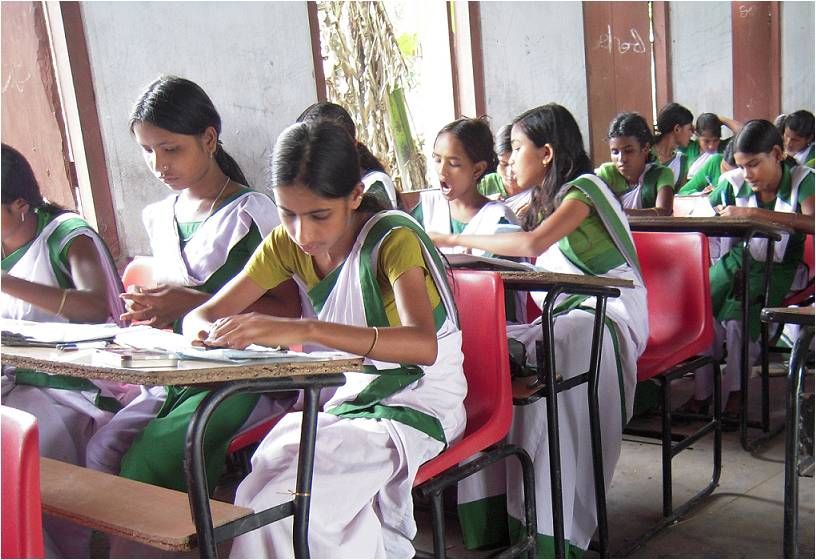
School children in the classroom, Lakhiganj High School, Assam

School education in Assam is imparted through a number of pre-primary, primary, middle, high and higher secondary schools The Government of Assam has implemented free and compulsory education for students up to the age of 18. Schools in Assam are either state run or under the management of private organisations. The syllabus at primary schools is established by the Directorate of Elementary Education, Assam. Gunoutsav Assam is the authority to check the quality of education in schools, while most schools are affiliated to SEBA, there are several schools in the state affiliated to the CBSE or NENBSE. The Higher education List of institutions of higher education in Assam

== Medium of instruction ==
The language used for instruction is Assamese, Bodo, Bengali, English, and Hindi. Many State Government affiliated schools and all the CBSE affiliated schools in the state use English as their medium of instruction at the Higher Secondary level. English is the medium of instruction in almost all higher educational institutions.

== See also ==
- List of institutions of higher education in Assam
