= R. Rajasree =

Indian novelist

Dr. R. Rajasree
- Dr. R. Rajasree
- Born: 22 May 1977; Parassinikadavu, Kannur, Kerala
- Education: Payyannur College (BA), Govt. Brennen College (MA), Govt. Brennen College of Teacher Education (B.Ed.), Kannur University (PhD)
- Occupations: Novelist, Professor
- Children: Nandaa Shriparvathi, Niranjan Shripathi
- Writing career
- Language: Malayalam
- Notable works: Kalyaniyennum Dakshayaniyennum Perulla Randu Sthreekalude Katha, Aathreyakam
- Notable awards: Kerala Sahithya Akademi Award (2022); Padmaprabha Literary Award (2026); Vayalar Award (2026)

Dr. R. Rajasree is a prominent Indian writer who writes in the Malayalam language. She is a recipient of the Kerala Sahitya Akademi award in 2022 for her novel, Kalyaniyennum Dakshayaniyennum Perulla Randu Sthreekalude Katha. The English translation of this award-winning novel, titled The Sthory of two Wimmin Named Kalyani and Dakshayani, was translated from Malayalam by feminist scholar and writer J. Devika and published by Penguin Hamish Hamilton in 2022. She also received the Vayalar Award in 2026 for her acclaimed novel Athreyakam. She currently serves as a professor in the Department of Malayalam at Government Brennen College, Thalassery.

== Notable Works ==
- 2018: Nayikaanirmmathi Vazhiyum Porulum
- 2018: Apasarppakaaghyanangal: Bhavanayum Rashtreeyavum
- 2019: Kalyaniyennum Dakshayaniyennum Perulla Randu Sthreekalude Katha
- 2024: Aathreyakam
- 2026: Ninte Katha

== Notable Awards ==
- 2022 - Kerala Sahitya Akademi Award for Novel for Kalyaniyennum Dakshayaniyennum Peraya Randu Sthreekalude Katha
- 2024 - V T Bhattathiripad Smaraka Sahithya Puraskaram for Athreyakam
- 2025 - Kozhikode Corporation's Literacy Award (instituted following the city's UNESCO designation) for Athreyakam
- 2026 - Padmaprabha Literary Award for Athreyakam
- 2026 - Vayalar Award for Aathreyakam
