= Keleswaram Mahadeva Temple =

Hindu temple in Kerala, India

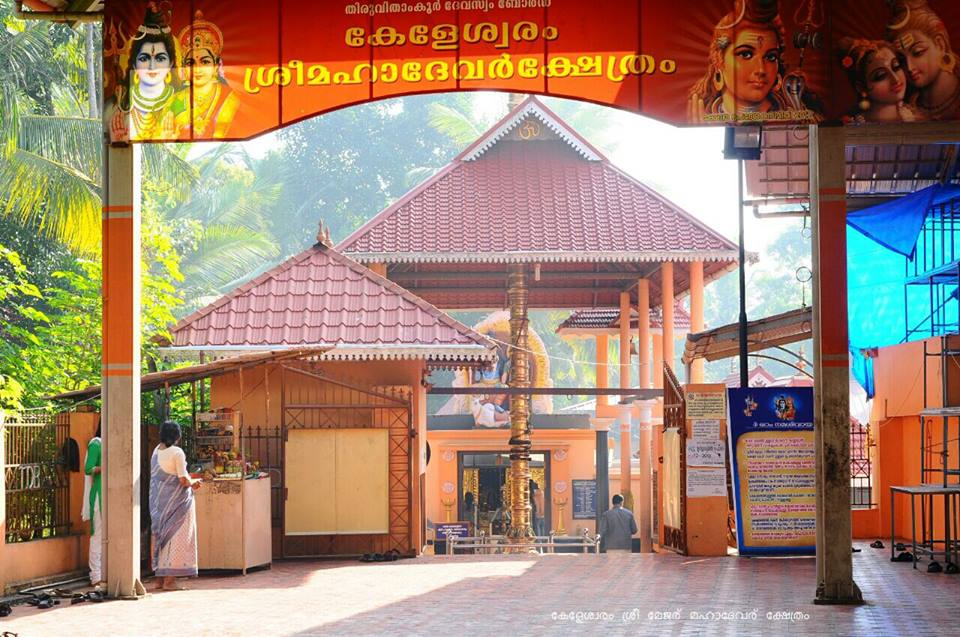

- Mahadeva Temple, Keleswaram, Thiruvananthapuram, Kerala

Religion
- Affiliation: Hinduism
- District: Thiruvananthapuram
- Deity: Mahadevar

Location
- Location: Keleswaram
- State: Kerala
- Country: India
- Interactive map of Keleswaram Mahadeva Temple
- Coordinates: 8°25′30.7″N 77°01′23.5″E

Architecture
- Type: Architecture of Kerala

Specifications
- Temple: One
- Elevation: 80.33 m (264 ft)

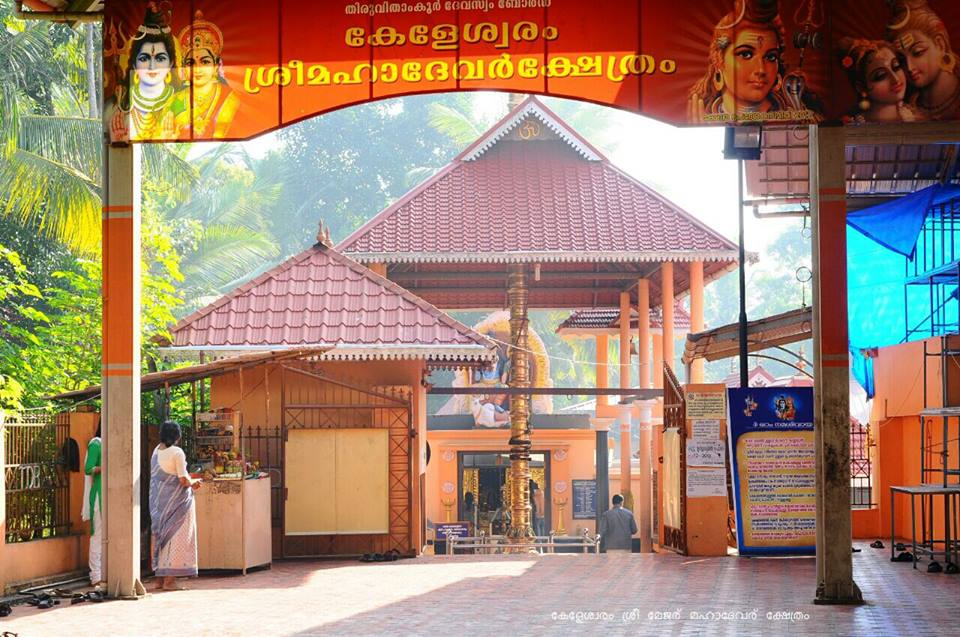
Entrance of the temple

Keleswaram Mahadeva Temple is a Hindu temple dedicated to Lord Shiva in the state of Kerala, India. The temple is situated in Keleswaram, a village in Thiruvananthapuram, the state capital of Kerala.

== Geography ==
It is located at Keleswaram.

== The management of the temple ==
The temple is under the management of Travancore Devaswom Board.

== Important days ==
Maha Shivaratri and Thiruvathira are the days which attract huge crowds to the temple.

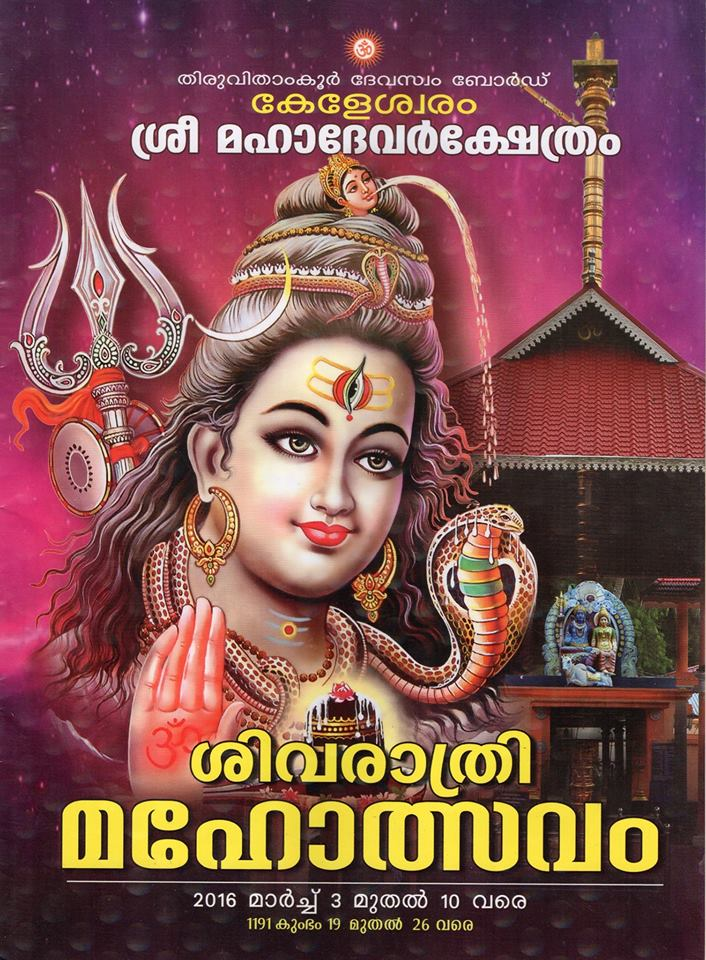

== Darshan ==
One of the speciality of this temple is Shiva Linga faces towards west. It is rarely seen. Darshan timings :

- Morning - 5.20 to 10.00
- Evening - 5.00 to 8.00

== Deities and sub-deities ==
The main deity of the temple is Hindu god Shiva. There are many upadevathas (sub-deities) adjacent to the temple.

The main upadevathas on the premises are:

1. Vishnu
2. Durga
3. Lord Ganesh
4. Nagaraja
5. Lord Murugan
6. Lord Ayyappan

== See also ==
- List of Hindu temples in Kerala
- Sreekanteswaram
- Kamaleswaram Mahadeva Temple
