= Arabi Ponnu =

1960 novel by M. T. Vasudevan Nair

Arabipponnu (The Arab Gold)
- Author: M. T. Vasudevan Nair; N. P. Mohammed
- Original title: അറബിപ്പൊന്ന്
- Translator: P. K. Raveendranath
- Language: Malayalam
- Genre: Novel
- Publisher: DC Books
- Publication date: 1960
- Publication place: India
- English publication date: 1993
- Media type: Print
- Pages: 440
- ISBN: 978-81-713-0516-2

Arabi Ponnu is a Malayalam novel jointly written by M. T. Vasudevan Nair and N. P. Mohammed. The theme is the smuggling of gold from Arab countries, especially Arab states of the Persian Gulf, in its early period.

== Background ==
The novel is unique in the aspect that it was written jointly by two writers-M. T. Vasudevan Nair and N. P. Mohammed. The two had maintained a very close personal relationship right from their first meeting in 1954. At the time, NP was 25 but already a recognized author while MT was still a budding writer, having published a few short stories. About the meeting, MT said in an interview to The Hindu, "I had only admired him from a distance till then. I was thrilled when he said he had also read some of my stories. We had tea together that evening." Later, in 1956, MT moved to Calicut where NP was residing and they became very close friends. MT would later recall that it was NP who always first read the draft of his novels.

The idea of co-authoring a novel struck the writers after they came across The Ugly American, a novel penned by Eugene Burdick and William J. Lederer. For writing Arabi Ponnu, the duo stayed at a rented house in Karuvarakkundu village, Malappuram for about two weeks.

== Plot summary ==
The Arabs came in their dhows laden with dates to Calicut, the Port of Truth, and through the dates smuggled in gold. The Port of Truth became the Port of Treachery. Koya, the protagonist, saw his hands smeared with the stink of Arab gold, opium, smuggled liquor and women. He saw them, he lived with them. He loaded opium on a Chinese vessel anchored off Beypore. But he emerged as a new man from the world of treachery and robbery, deceit and betrayal.

== Planned film adaptation ==
Hariharan wanted to adapt the novel into a film. After the success of Oru Vadakkan Veeragatha, MT and Hariharan approached Padmarajan to write the screenplay but Padmarajan was busy with the works of the film Innale. The project never took off.
