= V. Madhusoodanan Nair =

Indian Malayalam writer (born 1949)

- Born: 25 February 1949 (age 77); Aruviyodu, near Neyyattinkara, Thiruvananthapuram, Kerala, India
- Occupations: Poet, critic and academic
- Spouse: S. Malathi Devi
- Children: Two daughters and a son
- Relatives: N. Gourikutty Amma (mother); K. Velayudhan Pillai (father)
- Writing career
- Language: Malayalam
- Notable works: Naranathu Bhranthan; Agasthyahridayam; Acchan Piranna Veedu
- Notable awards: 1986 Kunju Pillai Award for Poetry; 1990 K. Balakrishnan Award; 1993 Kerala Sahitya Akademi Award for Poetry; 2003 Asan Smaraka Kavitha Puraskaram; 2003 R. G. Mangalom Award; 2003 Souparnikatheeram Prathibhapuraskaram; 2015 Janmashtami Puraskaram; 2016 Padmaprabha Literary Award; 2019 Sahitya Akademi Award
- Website: official website

V. Madhusoodanan Nair is an Indian poet and critic of Malayalam literature, who is credited with contributions in popularizing poetry through recitation. He is best known for Naranathu Bhranthan, the poem with the most editions in Malayalam literature as well as his music albums featuring recitations of his own poems and poems of other major poets. Kerala Sahitya Akademi honoured him with their annual award for poetry in 1993. He is also a recipient many other honours including Sahitya Akademi Award, Asan Smaraka Kavitha Puraskaram, Padmaprabha Literary Award, Kunju Pillai Award, R. G. Mangalom Award, Souparnikatheeram Prathibhapuraskaram and Janmashtami Puraskaram.

== Biography ==
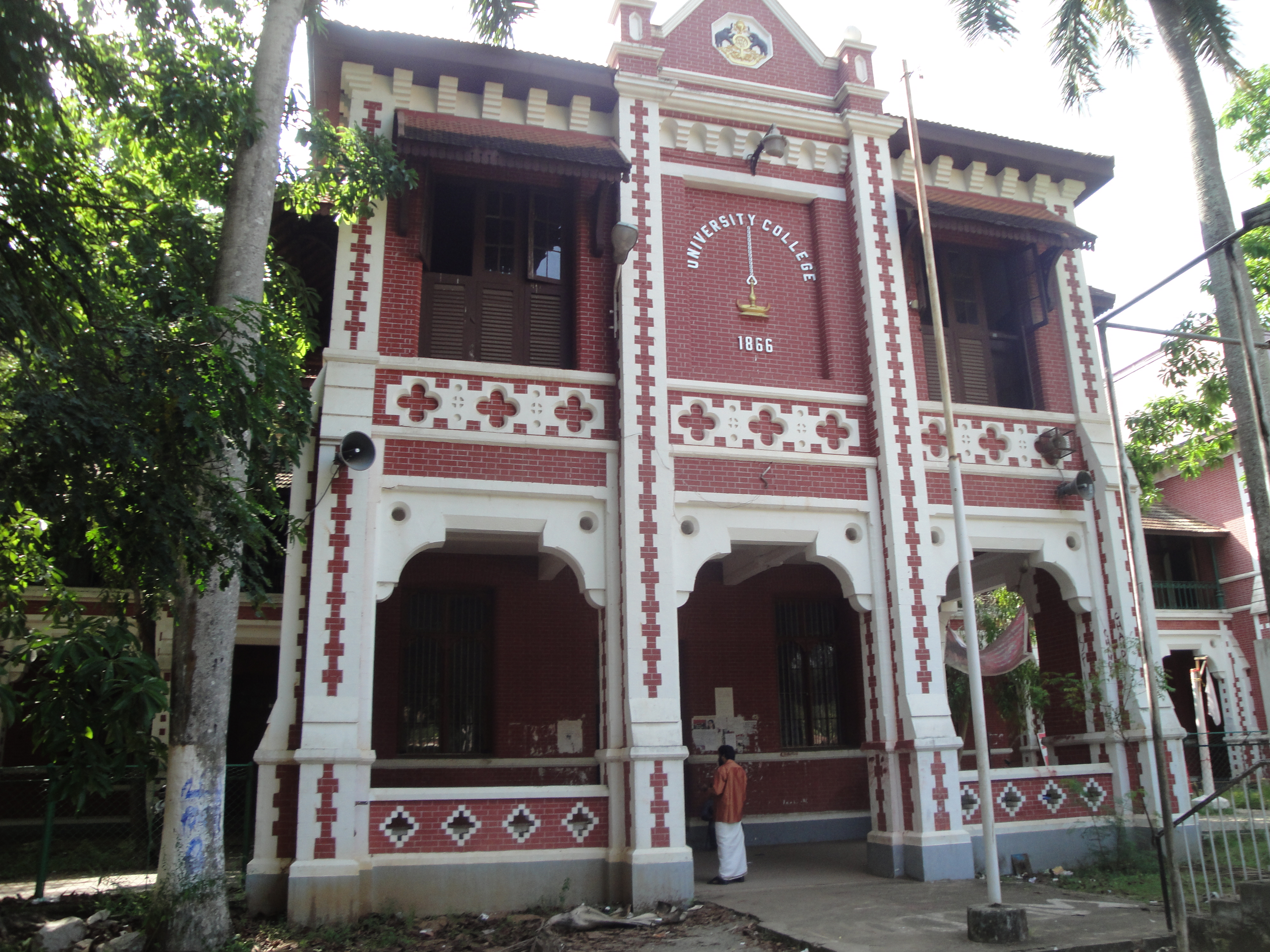
University College, Thiruvananthapuram

V. Madhusoodanan Nair was born on February 25, 1949, at Aruviyodu, a small riverside village near Neyyattinkara, in Thiruvananthapuram, the capital of the south Indian state of Kerala to N. K. Velayudhan Pillai and Gourikutty Amma. He imbibed quite early the tradition of many a ritualistic song from his father, who was a reciter of Thottam Pattu. His early schooling was at the local schools in Neyyattinkara and Kotturkonam after which he passed a pre-degree course from Velu Thampi Memorial Nair Service Society College. Subsequently, he graduated from Mahatma Gandhi College and earned a master's degree from the University College Thiruvananthapuram. He started his career as a journalist, working at Kumkumam magazine and Veekshanam daily and also as a program announcer at the Thiruvananthapuram station of the All India Radio before working as a sub-editor at Kerala Bhasha Institute. Later, he shifted to academics by joining St. Xavier's College, Thiruvananthapuram as a faculty from where he superannuated from service as the Professor and Head of the Department of Malayalam.

Madhusoodanan Nair is married to S. Malathi Devi and the couple has two daughters, Rashmi and Ramya and a son, Vishnu. The family lives in Devaswom Board Junction, Thiruvananthapuram.

== Legacy ==
V Madhusoodanan Nair reciting Malayalam poem, Vakku, at Malayalam Aikya Vedi seminar at Kollam

Madhusoodanan Nair started writing poems while at school and the first of his poems was published in the 1980s; his first poem anthology, Naranathu Bhranthan was published in 1992. The book is reported to be the most popular poetry anthology ever in Malayalam literature, with over 40 editions, surpassing the second most printed book, Ramanan of Changampuzha Krishna Pillai, which had 18 editions as of 2016. He is known to be conversant with several languages including Malayalam, English, Hindi, Sanskrit and Tamil. Besides poems, he has published five non-fiction books including Eliotum Richardsum, a critical study, Science Nikhantu, a lexicon and Nadodi Vignanam, a book on the folklore of Kerala. He has written the lyrics for three Malayalam films viz. Santhanagopalam, Kulam and Ardhanaari while his poems have been used in films such as Daivathinte Vikrithikal, Punyam, Punarjani and Veettilekkulla Vazhi. He also wrote lyrics for Tharangini and Manorama Music.

== Awards and honours ==
Madhusoodanan Nair received the Kunju Pillai Award for Poetry in 1986, followed by the K. Balakrishnan Award in 1990. Kerala Sahitya Akademi selected his debut anthology, Naranathu Bhranthan, for their annual award for poetry in 1993. A decade later, he was awarded the 2003 Asan Smaraka Kavitha Puraskaram, the same year as he received two more awards viz. R. G. Mangalom Award and the Souparnikatheeram Prathibhapuraskaram. In 2015 he received the Kadammanitta Ramakrishnan Award and Janmashtami Puraskaram and a year later, he was awarded the Padmaprabha Literary Award in 2016. Sahitya Akademi selected his work, Achan Piranna Veedu for their annual award in 2019.

== Bibliography ==
=== Poetry ===
- V Madhusoodanan Nair (2017). Madhusoodanannairude Kavithakal. DC Books. p. B0758DGYZQ. ASIN B0758DGYZQ.
- V Madhusoodanan Nair (2016). Naranathu Bhranthan. DC Books. p. 176. ASIN B01N78N18W.
- Bharatheeyam
- Madhusoodanan Nair, V. (2008). Gandhi. Kottayam: D.C. Books. ISBN 9788126418534.
- Agasthyahridayam
- V Madhusoodanan Nair. Acchan Piranna Veedu. DC Books. p. 256. ASIN B01M5KYLJ2.
- Ganga
- Madhusūdanan Nāir, V. (1993). Gāndharvaṃ. Kōṭṭayaṃ: DC Books. ISBN 8171302815. OCLC 30518387.
- Megangale Keezhadanguvin
- Marubhoomiyile Kinar
- Pongala
- Nataraja Smriti
- Sakshi
- V Madhusoodanan Nair. Ammayum Makalum. Music Zone. ASIN B00VZ1C4WK.
- V Madhusoodanan Nair (2007). Jeevanulla Prathima. DC Books. ISBN 9788126413997.
- Madhusoodanan Nair V. Ente rakshakan. DC Books.
- Madhusoodanan Nair, V. (1993). Gaandharvam. Kottayam: D C Books. ISBN 9788171302819.

=== Non-fiction ===
- Eliotum Richardsum (Criticism) Kerala Bhasha Institute
- Asia Kanmunpil (Sociological study) Kerala Bhasha Institute
- Science Nikhantu (Lexical study) Kerala Bhasha Institute
- Nadodi Vignanam (Folklore of Kerala) (Kerala Vignanakosam)
- Budhivikasam (Special education) Kanmani Publishers

== Filmography ==
- Santhanagopalam
- Kulam
- Ardhanaari
- Daivathinte Vikrithikal
- Punyam
- Punarjani
- Veettilekkulla Vazhi

== See also ==
- List of Malayalam-language authors by category
- List of Malayalam-language authors
