= Assam-type architecture =

Style of architecture

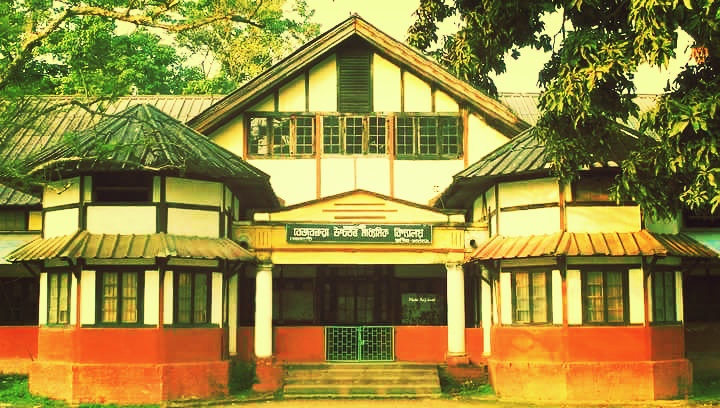
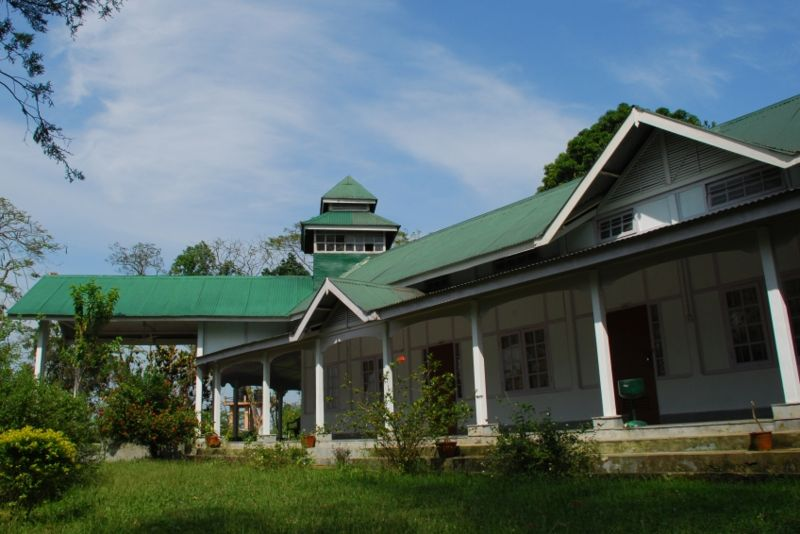
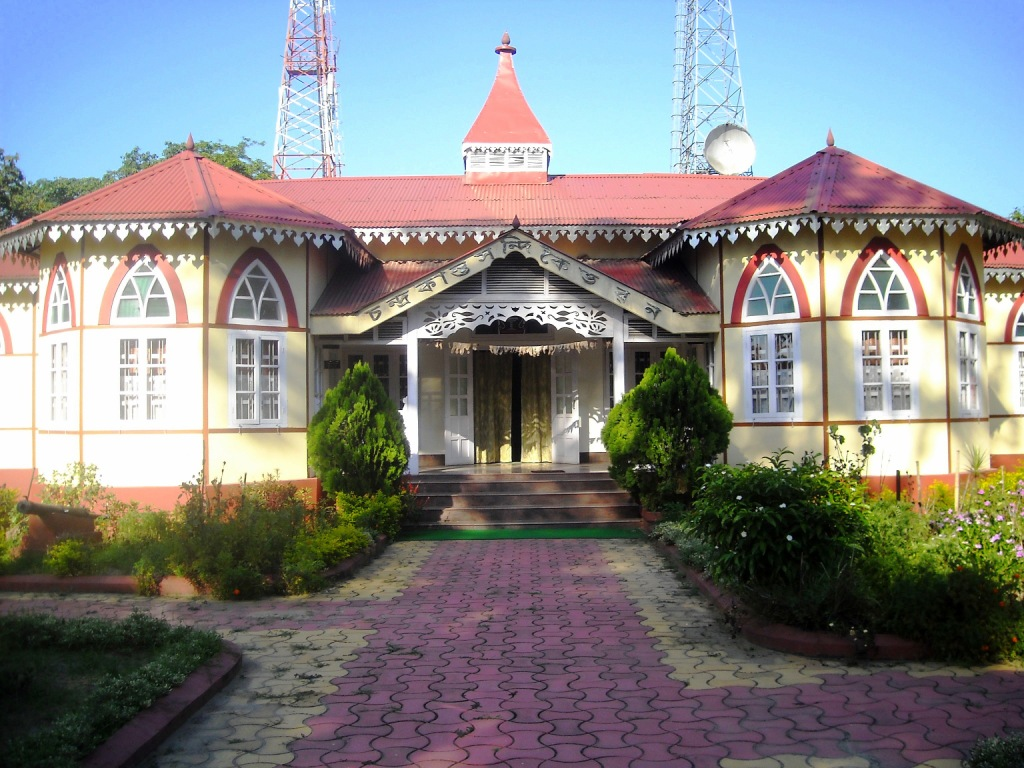
- Top: Bezbaroa school in Golaghat; Centre: A lodge at Kaziranga; Bottom: Headquarters of Assam Sahitya Sabha in Jorhat
- Location: India

Assam-type architecture, also called Beton or Baton is a vernacular architecture building style that evolved in the Indian state of Assam (and the adjacent Sylhet in Bangladesh) during the late 19th and 20th centuries. The characteristics of this style are lightweight timber and bamboo construction, steeply pitched roofs, raised plinths, and wide verandas. These designs have evolved due to the region's heavy monsoon rainfall and frequent earthquakes. These houses had emerged when engineers of British India adapted traditional Assamese building practices for modern use.

After the 1897 Assam earthquake, experts led by Japanese seismologist Fusakichi Omori studied local techniques and promoted a hybrid timber-reed-and-mud house that could withstand tremors and floods. Assam-type architecture is being used for both government and private residences throughout Assam (and present-day Sylhet, Bangladesh) in the first half of the 20th century. Assam-type architecture is often confused with stilted "Chang ghar" houses of the Mishing tribe, which are a separate indigenous tradition. Assam-type houses typically sit on short high plinths rather than on stilts.

== Historical Evolution ==
=== Colonial origins (late 19th–early 20th century) ===
Prior to British rule in India, Assamese villages primarily had simple kachcha homes (mud-and-thatch). The destruction caused by 1897 Assam earthquake prompted colonial authorities to study local building methods and upgrade them. Under British oversight (with Japanese and European seismologists assisting), a new "earthquake-proof" house type was developed in colonial Assam. This vernacular and modern hybrid design incorporated bamboo, timber and mud walls with robust roofing, resulting in a lightweight, flexible frame designed to sway with tremors. Upon research, The British Public Works Department (PWD) formally adopted this typology from 1897. Later, Assam PWD included specifications for “Assam-type” houses in its standard building schedule.

=== Post-independence use (mid–late 20th century) ===
After 1947, Assam-type houses were erected in rural and semi-urban areas by State government and private builders in Assam. The construction were considered as affordable housing, since the houses required little cement or metal, using instead abundant local bamboo, ikra reed and sal wood. By the 1950s–1970s, most villages and small towns in Assam had many single-storey or occasional two-storey Assam-type buildings with corrugated iron roofs and expansive porches. They also spread beyond Assam into the Sylhet region (now in Bangladesh), where similar wooden "Bangla-Baton" houses were constructed. Research on Assam's vernacular housing notes that Assam-type houses were "one of the most common" traditional forms in the region, providing effective earthquake resistance. Over this evolution period, the basic form of the structure remained same. Early Assam-type houses were almost entirely timber-and-mud (“kachcha”) whereas later versions often had brick or concrete foundations and partial masonry up to sill level for durability.

== Construction methods and materials ==
Assam-type buildings are built with locally available materials that balance lightness with strength. The structural frame is typically timber (often local Sal or Gamari wood) set on a raised brick or stone plinth. Vertical posts (“Kath khuta”) support horizontal beams, by forming a grid. The walls above the plinth are infilled with bamboo or ikra reed panels in a wattle-and-daub method. Walls are formed by woven bamboo or reed panels (known as “Ikra” walls) that are plastered with mud mixed with cow dung. Roofs were traditionally thatched but are now often corrugated metal. They have steep slopes and wide overhangs to shed heavy monsoon rains. Floors are set a few feet above ground on brick or wooden posts (a short plinth) to guard against flooding. This lightweight, timber‐and‐thatched construction gives the houses both resilience (the frames flex in earthquakes) and natural ventilation in Assam's hot, humid climate.

== Architectural features ==
The typical Assam-type house is a single or double‐storied rectangular building with simple, open plans. Common features include broad wraparound verandahs (porches) shaded by the roof eaves, which provide living space and shade. High gabled roofs (often with attic space) and generous overhangs protect against rain and sun. Interior ceilings are tall, and rooms are arranged around a main hall or central corridor, with direct openings to the verandah for airflow. Walls are usually timber-framed and plastered with mud or cementtheanamikapandey.com. Overall, Assam-type homes mix colonial and local elements: they are often rectangular or L‑shaped on level ground, with tiled or wooden floors and large windows to enhance cross-ventilation and light. Assam-type homes traditionally used bamboo, wood and thatch, but modern innovations are being introduced to improve durability and economy. With high ceilings and well-ventilated rooms, the floorings are either wooden or concrete with tiled, mosaic or stone surfacing with stilts. For example, builders now experiment with compressed stabilized earth blocks (CSEB), fly-ash bricks, agro-waste composites and emerging eco-materials like ferrocement and hempcrete as replacement for pure bamboo or mud. Prefabricated components and even 3D concrete printing have been suggested to speed up construction process.

Government housing programs have begun to embrace traditional Assam-style designs. Notably, the flood-resilient “chang ghar” (Mishing stilt house) design has been adopted under India's Pradhan Mantri Gramin Awas Yojana for Assam's flood‐prone areas. In these schemes, houses are built high on columns of concrete for added strength, following by the indigenous model. This has created a tension between preserving cultural heritage and pursuing cost-effective modern housing. Overall, Assam-type architecture continues to evolve, as it remains an important symbol of the region's identity.

Assam-type buildings are explicitly designed to meet Assam's climate and seismic challenges. Most are raised on plinths so that floodwaters can pass underneath without entering the living area. Roofs are steep and made of waterproof material (thatch or metal) so that torrential monsoon rain drains off quickly. The lightweight bamboo/wooden frame is inherently flexible under horizontal shaking, and the basic rectangular plan and simplicity of form also enhance earthquake safety. Together, the raised floors, ventilated shaded porches, and flexible timber structure, help Assam-type houses endure floods, humidity and frequent earthquakes.
