= Lakshmi Vijayam (1976 film) =

Lakshmivijayam
- Directed by: K. P. Kumaran
- Written by: A. G. Abraham; V. T. Nandakumar (dialogues)
- Screenplay by: V. T. Nandakumar
- Produced by: A. G. Abraham
- Starring: Sukumaran; Alummoodan; Baby Jayashanthi; Rani Chandra
- Cinematography: Shaji N. Karun
- Edited by: Gouthaman
- Music by: Shyam
- Production company: Samarias
- Distributed by: Samarias
- Release date: 23 July 1976
- Country: India
- Language: Malayalam

Lakshmivijayam is a 1976 Indian Malayalam film, directed by K. P. Kumaran and produced by A. G. Abraham. The film stars Sukumaran, Alummoodan, Baby Jayashanthi and Rani Chandra in the lead roles. The film has musical score by Shyam.

== Cast ==
- Sukumaran
- Alummoodan
- Baby Jayashanthi
- Rani Chandra

== Soundtrack ==
The music was composed by Shyam and the lyrics were written by Mullanezhi.

No.	Song	Singers	Lyrics	Length (m:ss)
1	"Maanathu Thaarangal"	K. P. Brahmanandan, Chorus	Mullanezhi	
2	"Naayaka Paalaka"	Vani Jairam, Chorus	Mullanezhi	
3	"Pakalinte Virimaaril"	K. J. Yesudas	Mullanezhi	
4	"Raavurangi Thaazhe"	K. J. Yesudas	Mullanezhi	
