= Golaghat Government Bezbaruah Higher Secondary School =

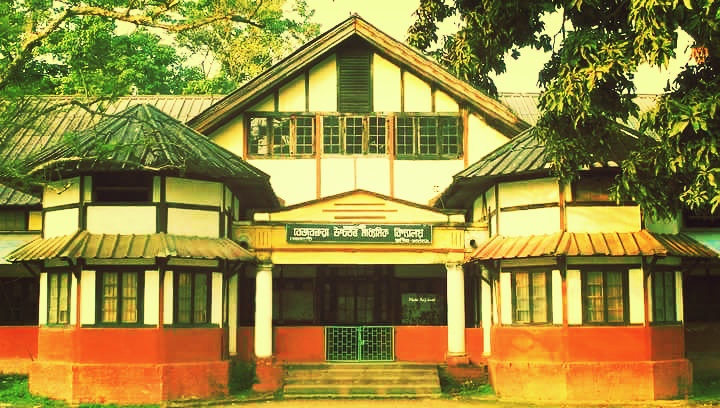
- Front façade of Bezbaruah Higher Secondary School, Golaghat

Location
- Ward #10; Golaghat - East; Golaghat, Assam, 785621; India; 26.515°N 93.974°E

Information
- Type: Government
- Established: 1886; 140 years ago
- Founder: Dinanath Bezbaruah
- Status: City heritage building
- School board: SEBA - HSLC (year 10); AHSEC - HSSLC (year 12)
- Session: April to March
- Principal: Dilip Tamuly
- Grades: 6–12
- Gender: boys
- Age: 11+ to 18+
- Campus type: Urban
- Nickname: Golaghat Govt.

Golaghat Government Bezbaruah Higher Secondary School is a boys' Upper Primary with Secondary and Senior Secondary school located at Golaghat East in Golaghat, Assam, India. Founded in the late 19th century by the educationalist Dinanath Bezbaruah, it is one of the oldest secondary schools in the state. based in Assam. Asamiya is the medium of instruction.

== Overview ==
The Govt. Bezbaruah Higher Secondary School has classes from grades 6 to 12. The administration of the school is headed by the Principal. It is affiliated to SEBA (HSLC) until grade 10 and AHSEC (HSSLC) after grade 10 until grade 12.

== Background ==
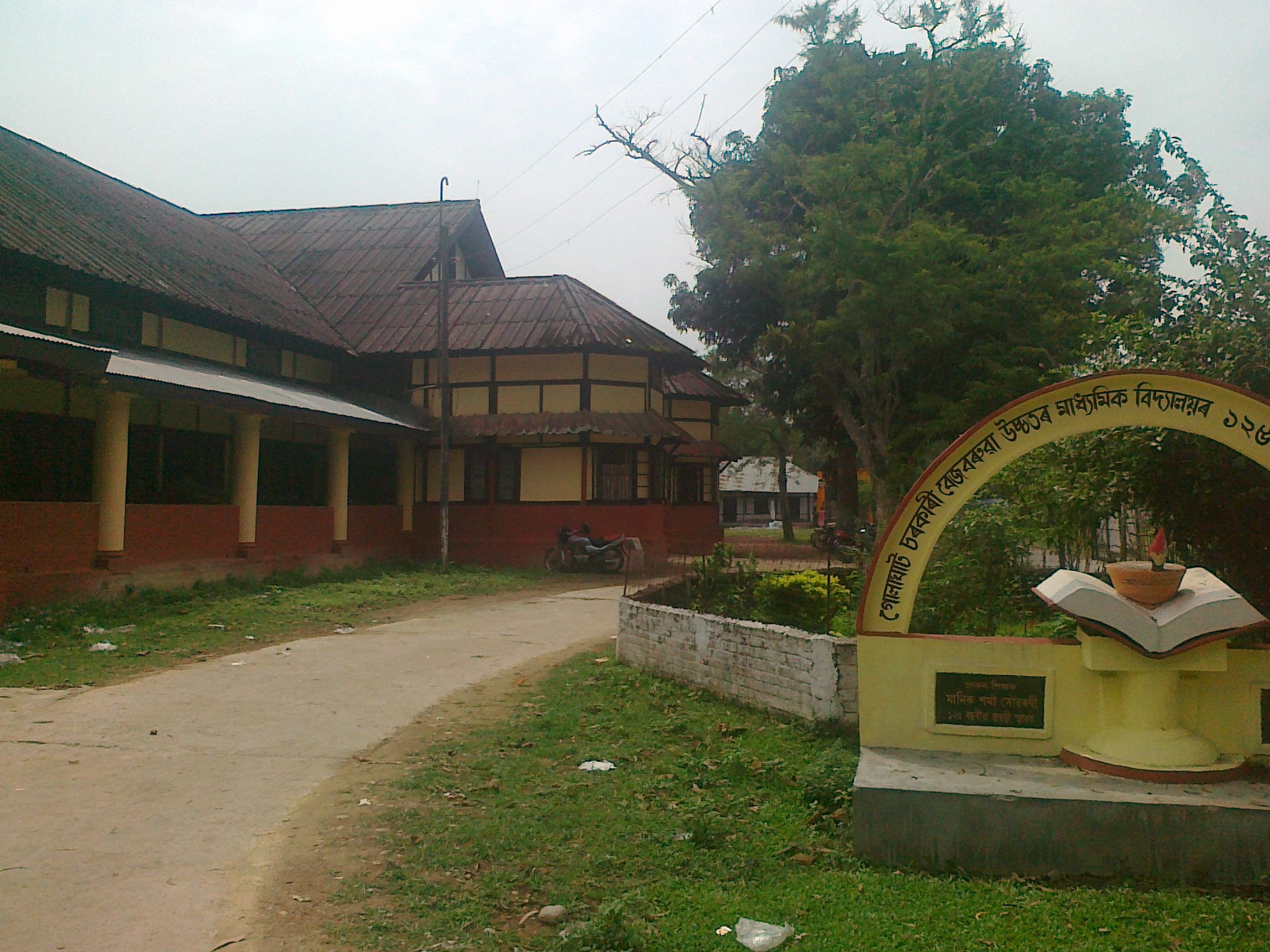
Right side view of the Golaghat Govt. School campus from the entrance gate.

The Indian Education Commission's (1882) recommendation for expansion of secondary education through the agency of private enterprise resulted in the establishment of some institutions by philanthropists. Gobinda Bezbaruah, an educationist, established one High School each at Golaghat, Jorhat and Sivasagar.

As a part of technical education, a system of industrial apprenticeship was introduced initially from the Williamson Trust Fund. George Williamson (Senior) of Golaghat, renowned tea planter bequeathed an amount of ₹1lack in his will that amounted to £10,000 at that time "for educational purposes combined with, schools of industry and art of the province" and "in the establishment of small libraries" both in English and Vernacular languages at the schools. To suggest the best means of utilizing the bequest, the Chief Commissioner held a meeting on 15 August 1887 where it was unanimously resolved that an amount of ₹7,000 be set apart for public libraries and another amount of ₹14,000 be appropriated or the establishment of two schools at Golaghat and Jorhat to be named Williamson schools.

The wave of evolving education institutions propagated the idea to establish a premier school in Golaghat that would not only contribute to the development of its citizens, but would also play a role to enrich the regional language, Asamiya. The educationalist Dinanath Bezbaruah and his team then took the project for establishing a senior secondary school, and finally in the year 1886, the Bezbarauah Higher Secondary School was founded in Golaghat.

== See also ==
- Golaghat district
- Education in Assam
