= Government Senior Secondary School Central Pendam =

Government Senior Secondary School, Central Pendam

Location
- Post Upper Pendam, Via Rangpo, E. Sikkim, 737132; Central Pendam, Sikkim; India; 27°12′41″N 88°31′16″E

Information
- Type: school under Department of Education, Government of Sikkim
- Motto: Work is Workship
- Established: 1942
- Principal: Mr. Lekhraj Pokhrel
- Staff: 63
- Enrollment: 700(approx.)
- Campus: 6 acres
- Affiliations: Affiliated to Central Board of Secondary Education, Guwahati
- Website: http://www.pendamschool.in

Government Senior Secondary School, Central Pendam (also known as Tikalal Niroula Senior Secondary School) is a government, co-educational, English-medium school situated at Central Pendam in Pakyong District of Sikkim, India. It was established in 1942. The school prepares students for AISSE and AISSCE for science, commerce, humanities, IT application and financial marketing and management. The school currently runs from pre-primary to standard XII.

== Campus ==
The school is located in Central Pendam village in Pakyong District of Sikkim, India. The school compound measures around 6 acres. The school is 14 km from Rangpo and 18 km from Singtam.

== Affiliation ==
The school is affiliated to Central Board of Secondary Education, New Delhi, and prepares students for All India Senior School Certificate Examination (AISSCE) and All India Secondary School Examination (AISSE)

- Affiliation No.:1820007
- School Code No.:05404
- School ID No.:EG100695

== Motto ==
The motto of school is Vidya Dadati Binayam (Learning Leads to Humility)

== History ==
Government Senior Secondary School, Central Pendam, East Sikkim was established in 1942 as a committee school. Till 1953 it remained an M.E. School. It was upgraded to a Junior High School in 1956 and 1957 and added class IX in 1959. The first batch of Class X appeared for their school final examination as private candidates in 1961. The school was recognized as a High School by the CBSE in New Delhi in 1976, and the first batch of class X appeared for their AISSE under CBSE in 1977 from their home center. In 1985 it was upgraded to a Senior Secondary School with Science and Humanities streams. In 2004 a Commerce Stream was added, and IT and FMM were added in 2011.

The first principal of the school was Mr. B. S. Rajput. As an honor to the senior leader of the local region. The school is named after Late Tikalal Niroula, one of the founding members and a political activist from Central Pendam.

== In media ==
The school has been active in its academic pursuits along with participation in the publication of daily newspapers. The Zee News's Quiz show on renewable energy by Anupam Kher on 2006 featured two students from the school, Binod Mainali, and Arvind Mahto. In 2016, Arpan Sharma, alumni of this school won the prestigious award of Distinguished Student from the American Physical Society. He is also the founder of youth forum and magazine Environment and Society.

== Notable alumni ==
Lall Bahadur Das, Speaker of Sikkim Legislative Assembly, S D Dhakal, Secretary to the Chief Minister Office, Government of Sikkim, Dr. Mani Kumar Sharma, Notable Dermatologist and Former Health Minister Government of Sikkim
