= Engandiyur =

Engandiyur Engandiyur
- Village
- Location in Kerala, India
- Coordinates: 10°30′10.24″N 76°3′35.735″E
- Country: India
- State: Kerala
- District: Thrissur
- Tahsil: Chavakkad

Government
  - Body: Engandiyur Grama Panchayath

Area
  - Total: 14.11 km^{2} (5.45 sq mi)
- Elevation: 7.80 m (25.6 ft)

Population (2011)
  - Total: 23,101
  - Density: 827.93/km^{2} (2,144.3/sq mi)

Languages
  - Official: Malayalam
- Time zone: UTC+5:30 (IST)
- PIN: 680615
- Telephone code: +91
- Nearest city: Chavakkad
- Climate: Average high (°C) (Köppen)

Engandiyur is a village in the Chavakkad taluka of the Thrissur district in the state of Kerala, India. It has an area of 1411 hectares and harbours 5,760 households with a total population of 23,101 as per the 2011 Census. The nearest town, Chavakkad is at a distance of 8 km. The male population is 10,528, and the female population is 12,573. The Scheduled Caste population is 615, and the Scheduled Tribe population is 45. The census location code of the village is 627789.

== Location ==
This village shares borders with Orumanayur Panchayath on the north side and Vadanapilly Panchayath on the south side. On the west side is the Arabian Sea and to the east, Canoli Canal. The native language of Engandiyoor is Malayalam.

== Overview ==
Engandiyur is a village that is dependent on Persian Gulf countries for income. Some notable historical sites include the Tippu Sultan Kotta, Chettuva Juma masjid and the Aayiram Kanni Temple, Kuruperi Muthappan Temple Manappad, St. Thomas Church, Pokkulangara Temple, Thirumangalam Temple and St. Lourde Mary's Church, which are all are located in this panchayat. A well known Elephant named Gajaraja shathriyan Shanmuka Priya Gaja Samrat Chulliparambil Vishnu Shankar (Height: 305 cm) is native to Engandiyur. The village contains also nine schools including St. Thomas Higher Secondary School, St. Thomas LP School, National Higher Secondary School, Thriumangalm U P School, Paul Chitalapilly Memorial English Medium School, Thirunaarayana UP School, Sree Narayana UP School, Saraswathy Vidya Nikethan Central School, and the Government Mappila Upper Primary School.

Engandiyur is considerably developed in education, literacy, health, employment and shelter. Engandiyur won the Swaraj Trophy award for Best Panchayat in Thrissur district twice consecutively (2012-2013 and 2013–2014).

== Demographics ==
As of 2011 India census, Engandiyur had a population of 23,101 with 10,528 males and 12,573 females.

== Literacy ==
- Total literate population: 19,832 (85.85%)
- Literate male population: 9,034 (85.81%)
- Literate female population: 10,798 (85.88%)

== Educational Facilities ==
There is one private Pre-primary School in the village. There are seven government Primary Schools in the village. There is one private Primary School in the village. There are four government Middle Schools in the village. There are two private Middle Schools in the village. There are two government Secondary Schools in the village. There is one private Secondary School in the village. There are three government Senior Secondary Schools in the village.

The nearest Degree College of Arts and Science and Commerce (Nattika) is at a distance of 5 to 10 km from the village. The nearest engineering college (Thrissur) is at a distance of more than 10 km from the village. The nearest medical college (Velappaya) is at a distance of more than 10 km from the village. The nearest Management Institute (Thrissur) is at a distance of more than 10 km from the village. The nearest polytechnic (Nattika) is at a distance of 5 to 10 km from the village. The nearest Vocational Training School (Thrissur) is at a distance of more than 10 km from the village. The nearest Non-formal Training Centre (Thrissur) is at a distance of more than 10 km from the village. The nearest special school for the disabled (Thrissur) is at a distance of more than 10 km from the village. The nearest other educational facility (Thrissur) is at a distance of more than 10 km from the village.

== Medical Facilities ==
=== Hospitals ===
- Mary Immaculate Hospital
- T.M Hospital
- Well care Hospital

=== Government ===
The nearest community health centre is at a distance of less than 5 km from the center of the village. There is one primary health centre in the village. There is one primary health sub-centre in the village. There is one maternity and child welfare centre in the village. The nearest T.B. clinic is at a distance of more than 10 km from the village. The nearest allopathy hospital is at a distance of 5 to 10 km from the village. The nearest alternative medicine hospital is at a distance of 5 to 10 km from the village. There are three dispensaries in the village. There is one veterinary hospital in the village. The nearest mobile health clinic is at a distance of more than 10 km from the village. There is one family welfare centre in the village.

== Transportation ==
The nearest airport is Cochin International Airport, Kochi - 65 km distant. The nearest railway stations are at Thrissur (20 km) and Guruvayoor (8 km). The NH-66 road passes through the middle of the village, along with two parallel roads on either side of NH named east and west Tippu Sulthan roads. A mini harbour is also located at north-west of the village, which is primarily used for fishing.

Autorikshas or Modified Autorikshas is available in the village, along with public and private bus services.

Taxi services are also available in the village, which is connected to a national highway The nearest state highway is at a distance of less than 5 km from the village center.

== Communication ==
The village has a post office, with pin code 680615. Landline telephones, public call offices, and excellent mobile signal coverage is available in the village. The nearest Private courier service is at a distance of less than n 5 km from the village.

== Drinking Water ==
Water in this village is available in the form of treated and untreated tap water, uncovered wells, and water from hand pumps, tube wells, and borewells.

== Economy ==
The main source of economy is foreign income from emigrants or non-resident Indians to Gulf countries. Other sources of income include farming and fishing, where remuneration is earned for selling seafood and collectibles such as shells, crab, and fish.

== Sanitation ==
This village has open drainage systems, where sewage is discharged directly into the sewage plant. The area is covered under the Total Sanitation Campaign (TSC). Community toilets or showers are not commin in the village.

== Market and Banking ==
There are plenty of banks available in this village, including branches of Canara bank and Federal bank in Pokkulangara, and South Indian bank in Anjamkallu. All banks are fitted with ATM facilities. The Commercial bank is available in this back, along with Co-operative Bank.

Agricultural Credit Society, self help groups, public distribution systems (PDS) are all available. Local weekly markets known as "Haats" are at a distance of 5 to 10 km from the village. The nearest Agricultural marketing society is at a distance of 5 to 10 km from the village.

== Municipal facilities ==
The nearest Integrated Child Development Scheme (Nutritional Centre) is at a distance of 5 to 10 km. In addition to this, Anganwadi Centre (Nutritional Centre), ASHA (Accredited Social Health Activist), a sports field, cinema halls, Public Library, public reading rooms, newspaper supply, assembly polling station, and birth and death registration offices are present in the village.

== Electricity ==
Almost all homes are supplied with electricity in this village. Street lights are also present in sufficient numbers to provide adequate lighting.

== Land Use ==
Engandiyur exhibits the following land use pattern (area in hectares):

- Area under non-agricultural Uses: 157.13
- Net Area Sown: 1253.87
- Total Un-irrigated Land Area: 1049.66
- Area irrigated by source: 204.21

== Ecology ==
The East side of the village is covered by Canolly Canal and the West side by Arabian Sea. Estuaries are the most treasured features this village. The presence of Mangrove vegetation also sustains the region's biodiversity.

=== Salt Water Intrusion ===
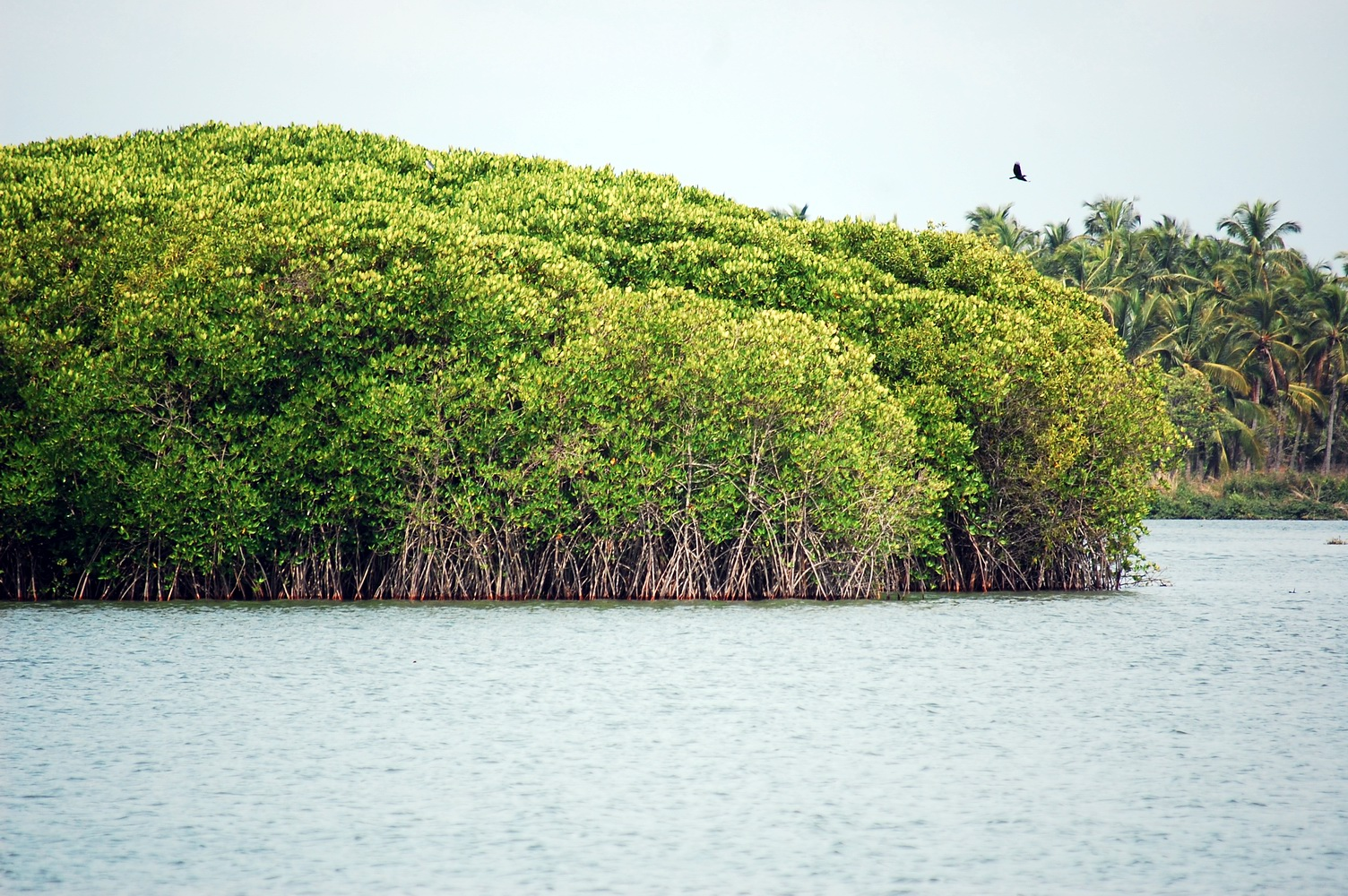
Mangrove chettuva

Salt water intrusion is a concern in this region, as it seeps into farming lands and household water resources in the Summer season. Proper maintaining of Meenkadav Bund, Enamakkal bund, which is the main check dam of the village is suggested to reduce this problem.

== Irrigation facilities ==
Sources of irrigation are as follows (area in hectares):

- Wells/Tube-wells: 83.77
- Others: 120.44

== Notable people ==
- Ramu Kariat, famous film director, who was noted for National Award-winning movie Chemmeen
- Velayudhan Panikkassery, famous historian and writer
- * Malayala Swamy (1885–1962), Hindu spiritual leader and social reformer, was born in Engandiyoor, Kerala.<ref>{{cite book |title=Sri Sadguru Malayala Swamy |author=P. Satyanarayana |publisher=Tirumala Tirupati Devasthanams |year=2017}}</ref>
