= Meenangadi Government Higher Secondary School =

- meenangadi

Location
- H.S.S Road; Meenangadi P.O, india, Kerala, 673591; 11°39′48″N 76°09′59″E

Information
- Type: Co-Education
- Founded: 1958
- Sister school: Government lower primary school
- School board: Kerala State Education Board
- School district: wayanad
- School code: 12002 ,15048
- Principal: Shivi Krishnan
- Headmaster: Dr KT Ashraf
- Student to teacher ratio: 33
- Hours in school day: 10 AM - 4 PM
- USNWR ranking: 2nd in kerala

Government Higher Secondary School Meenangadi, Kerala, India, was started in 1958. The school is situated about 600 meters from Meenangadi town. In the higher secondary there are science, commerce and humanities batches. The school is popular for the various achievements in art, sports and club activities and social services.

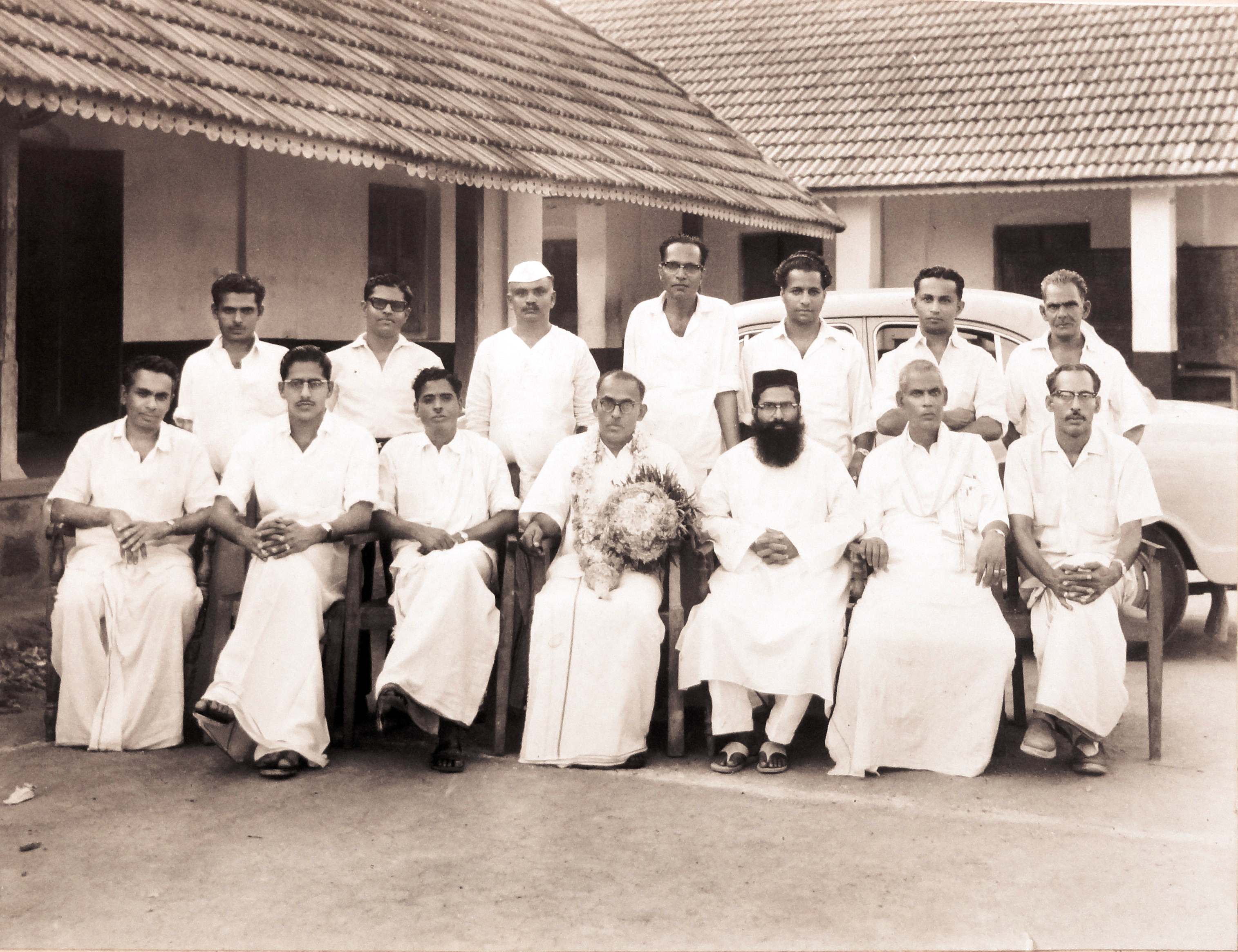
Photo taken on the occasion of the Retirement of Sri. M. O. George, Head Master, G. S. S., Meenangadi, on 31 March 1966.
