= Mullanezhi =

Indian poet, playwright, lyricist and actor (1948–2011)

Mullanezhi Neelakandan
- Born: 16 May 1948; Ollur, Thrissur, Kerala, India
- Died: 22 October 2011 (aged 63); Thrissur, India
- Resting place: Mullanezhi Mana at Avinissery, Thrissur
- Other name: Mullanezhi
- Occupations: Lyricist, poet, playwright, actor
- Years active: 1976–2011

Mullanezhi Neelakandan Namboothiri (16 May 1948 – 22 October 2011), known mononymously as Mullanezhi, was an Indian poet, playwright, lyricist and actor from Thrissur. He was awarded the Nalapadan Award (Nalapaddan Memorial Cultural Society, Kunnathur, Punnayurkulam) in 1989 for his poem "Naranath Brandhan". He was awarded the Kerala Sahitya Akademi Award twice: in 1995 for the drama Samathalam and in 2010 for the poetry collection Kavitha. He wrote more than 70 songs for 25 movies and also acted in films like Uppu, Piravi, Kazhakam and Neelathamara.

== Biography ==
Mullanezhi was born in Mullanezhi Mana, Ollur, Thrissur on 16 May 1948. Though he began to write poems from his childhood, it was Vyloppilli Sreedhara Menon, who discovered the poet in him and guided him in his life and career. Vyloppilly was also instrumental in prompting him join for Vidwan course, and thus to become a school teacher. He started his career as a teacher from Ramavarmapuram Government High School. He voluntarily retired from Government Model Higher Secondary School for Boys, Thrissur on 2004.

Mullanezhi's important collections of poems are Mohapakshi, Raapattu, Naaranathupranthan and Penkoda. Mullanezhi was also a theatre activist. He led Agragami Theaters and wrote many plays, some of which have been collected in the anthology Samathalam. In theatre, he was inspired by the social reformist movement inaugurated by the likes of V. T. Bhattathiripad, M. R. Bhattathiripad, and Premji. He won the Kerala Sahitya Academy Award for his drama Samathalam in 1995 and his anthology of poems in 2010. He served as a director board member of Kerala Sangeetha Nataka Akademi from 1980 to 1983.

He became a film lyricist in 1976, by penning the song "Karukaruthoru Pennanu" for Njavalpazhangal by Azeez. He wrote four songs in K. P. Kumaran's Lakshmi Vijayam, under the music direction of Shyam. Mullanezhi worked with G. Devarajan, M. B. Sreenivasan, Raveendran, K. Raghavan, A. T. Ummer, Johnson, Jerry Amaldev and Vidhyadharan. His last film was Indian Rupee. He has written more than 70 songs for 25 movies.

Mullanezhi entered the world of acting through the drama, Chaverppada (1970) in which he acted alongside Premji. He acted in a few films including Piravi, Uppu and Kazhakam.

He died on 22 October 2011 due to cardiac arrest.

== Partial filmography ==
=== As lyricist ===
1. Lakshmivijayam (1976)
2. Njavalppazhangal (1976)
3. Mela (1980)
4. Chora Chuvanna Chora (1980)
5. Kanikonna (1980)
6. Swarnnappakshikal (1981)
7. Amrithageetham (1982)
8. Njaanonnu Parayatte (1982)
9. Kaattile Paattu (1982)
10. Kinginikkombu (1983)
11. Rachana (1983)
12. Veenapoovu (1983)
13. Yathi Bhangam (1983)
14. Vellam (1985)
15. Ayanam (1985)
16. Kayyum Thalayum Purathidaruthu (1985)
17. Sanmanassullavarku Samadhanam (1986)
18. Kabani (2001)
19. Narendran Makan Jayakaanthan Vaka (2001)
20. Sundarikkutty (2003)
21. Bhakthajanangalude Sradhaykku (2011)
22. Kunjettan (2011)
23. Atha Mazha Atha Veyil (2011)
24. Indian Rupee (2011)
25. Namukkore Aakasham (2015)

=== As an actor ===
1. Ayanam (1985)
2. Uppu (1987)
3. Piravi (1989)
4. Bhoomi Geetham (1993)
5. Swaham (1994)
6. Kazhakam (1995)
7. Ee Puzhayum Kadannu (1996)
8. Kulam (1997)
9. Thattakam (1998)
10. Vanaprastham (1999)
11. Garshom (1999)
12. Shayanam (2000)
13. Neythukaran (2001)
14. Pulijanmam (2006)
15. Neelathamara (2009)
16. Sufi Paranja Katha (2009)
17. Mounam (2009)
18. Ekantham (2009)
19. Katha Thudarunnu (2010)
20. Jalachayam (2010)
21. Bhakthajanangalude Shradhaykku (2011)
22. Snehaveedu (2011)
