= Gunotsav Assam =

Quality education in Assam

Morning assembly during gunutshav in Kamarbandha Higher Secondary School in Assam, India.

Gunotsav Assam is an initiative of Government of Assam in Elementary education and Secondary school education, by Samagra Shiksha Assam to uplift the quality of education in schools for students, infrastructure of schools and teachers to students ratio. It is a census based method of assessment and rating of all government schools in Assam, assigning grades from A+ to D based on infrastructure, learning outcomes, community participation, and co-curricular activities. Evaluation is conducted using an OMR based format for students from class 1 to 12. Senior Government officials including Ministers, MLAs, IAS, IPS, and IFS officers serve as External Evaluators, spending a full school day at each assigned school.

== Background and Origin ==
Gunotsav, means "Celebrating Quality", was originally launched by the Government of Gujarat's Education Department in November 2009 as an accountability framework for assessing primary school quality.

The first phase in Assam was conducted from 4 to 7 April 2017, covering eight districts: Barpeta, Chirang, Dibrugarh, Hailakandi, Kamrup, Lakhimpur, Morigaon, and West Karbi Anglong. In its first year, 48,868 schools were covered.

== Evaluation ==
The evaluations are done across multiple parameters including:

- Scholastic
- * Language (English, Assamese, Bengali, Hindi and Bodo)
- ** Numerical (Mathematics knowledge such as numbers)
- Infrastructure (Facilities like furniture, black board, electric supply, fan, lights, ramp doors, and windows), fencing wall, building, classrooms
- Sanitation (Separate toilets for boys and girls, clean and drinkable water facility, running water)
- ICT (Initiative classroom teaching) like computer, model, wall painting (BaLa) learning subject matter. General knowledge and current affairs.
- Community participation and contribution (Parents participation, schools management committee involvement and society involvement)
- PM-Poshan (Mid day meal provided to students free of cost daily for that kitchen and cooking staff involvement)
- Internet facility in the school
- Attendance by Assam Shiksha Setu for teachers and students using tablet.
- Inspection done by Government official of education department in academic year.

Gunotsav results carry 10% weightage in Annual Examinations.

=== Grading System ===
The schools are graded on a five-tier scale. Scholastic learning outcomes carry 90% weightage, co-curricular area and community participation each carry 5%. Infrastructure is assessed but not counted towards the final grade.

Grade	Performance	2017 Schools	2024 Schools
A+	Outstanding	6,037 (12.35%)	11,593 (35.76%)
A	Excellent	12,927 (26.45%)	14,932 (46.05%)
B	Good	13,636 (27.90%)	4,603 (14.20%)
C	Satisfactory	9,163 (18.75%)	1,032 (3.18%)
D	Needs Improvement	7,105 (14.54%)	261 (0.81%)

== Impact ==
Since its introduction in Assam in 2017, Gunotsav has been associated with measurable improvements in government school education across the state. Based on evaluation results, the School Education Department and district administrations have taken targeted remedial measures, contributing to significant shifts in school grades between 2017 and 2024.

Outcome	Detail
Remedial teaching	C and D grade schools receive targeted remedial teaching after each cycle
Infrastructure	Partitioned walls, electrification, and classroom built based on Gunotsav findings
Community Participation	Dining halls and classrooms constructed by local communities

Academic research on teacher perspectives found a positive effect of the program on primary school education in Assam, including improvements in attendance, teaching-learning resources, and community involvement.
