= Government Model Higher Secondary School for Boys =

Government Model Higher Secondary School for Boys, Thrissur
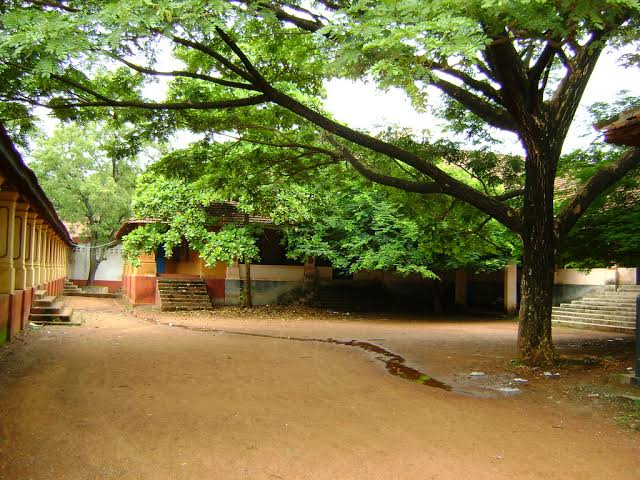
- Government Model Boys Higher Secondary School Campus, Thrissur

Location
- G6H9+48X, Palace Rd, Chembukkav, Thrissur; Thrissur, Kerala; India
- 10.5274135°N 76.2188325°E

Information
- Type: State Government School
- Established: 1836; 190 years ago
- School district: Thrissur
- Campus: Urban
- Nickname: Model Boys
- Affiliation: Government of Kerala

Government Model Higher Secondary School For Boys is a Kerala Government higher secondary school situated in Thrissur City, Kerala, India. It was started in 1836 and is the oldest school in Thrissur District.

== Notable alumni ==
- P. K. Ittoop, Ex.MLA and Advocate
- Tito Wilson, Actor
- Devan (actor), Actor
- Vedan (rapper), Rapper, Song Writer
- Adv. Tony Emmatty, National Panel Cricket Umpire - Board of Control for Cricket in India

== Notable faculty ==
- Mullanezhi, Poet, Lyricist, Playwright, Teacher
