= Kalliyoor =

- Village
- Nickname: Vellayani
- Location in Kerala, India Kalliyoor (India)
- Coordinates: 8°25′0″N 77°0′0″E
- Country: India
- State: Kerala
- District: Thiruvananthapuram

Government
  - Type: Local Self Government
  - Body: Gram panchayat

Population (2011)
  - Total: 40,816

Languages
  - Official: Malayalam, English
- Time zone: UTC+5:30 (IST)
- PIN: 695020, 695042
- Vehicle registration: KL-01

Kalliyoor is a village in Thiruvananthapuram district in the state of Kerala, India. Kalliyoor Grama Panchayat consists of 21 Wards. 1.Pappanchani 2.Vellayani 3.Mukaloormoola 4.Sarvodayam 5.Santhivila 6.Kulakudiyoorkonam 7.Upaniyoor 8.Ookode 9.Chenkode 10.Vallamcode 11.Pakaloor 12.Punnamoodu 13.Office Ward 14.Peringamala 15.Kuzhithalachal 16.Hospital Ward 17.Kannankuzhi 18.Kakkamoola 19.Poonkulam 20.Signal Station 21.AGC(Agriculture College).

== Demographics ==
As of 2011 India census, Kalliyoor had a population of 40816 with 20078 males and 20738 females.
