= List of Sahitya Akademi Award winners for Malayalam =

List of winners of a literary honor in India

Sahitya Akademi Award for Malayalam
- Award for contributions to Malayalam literature
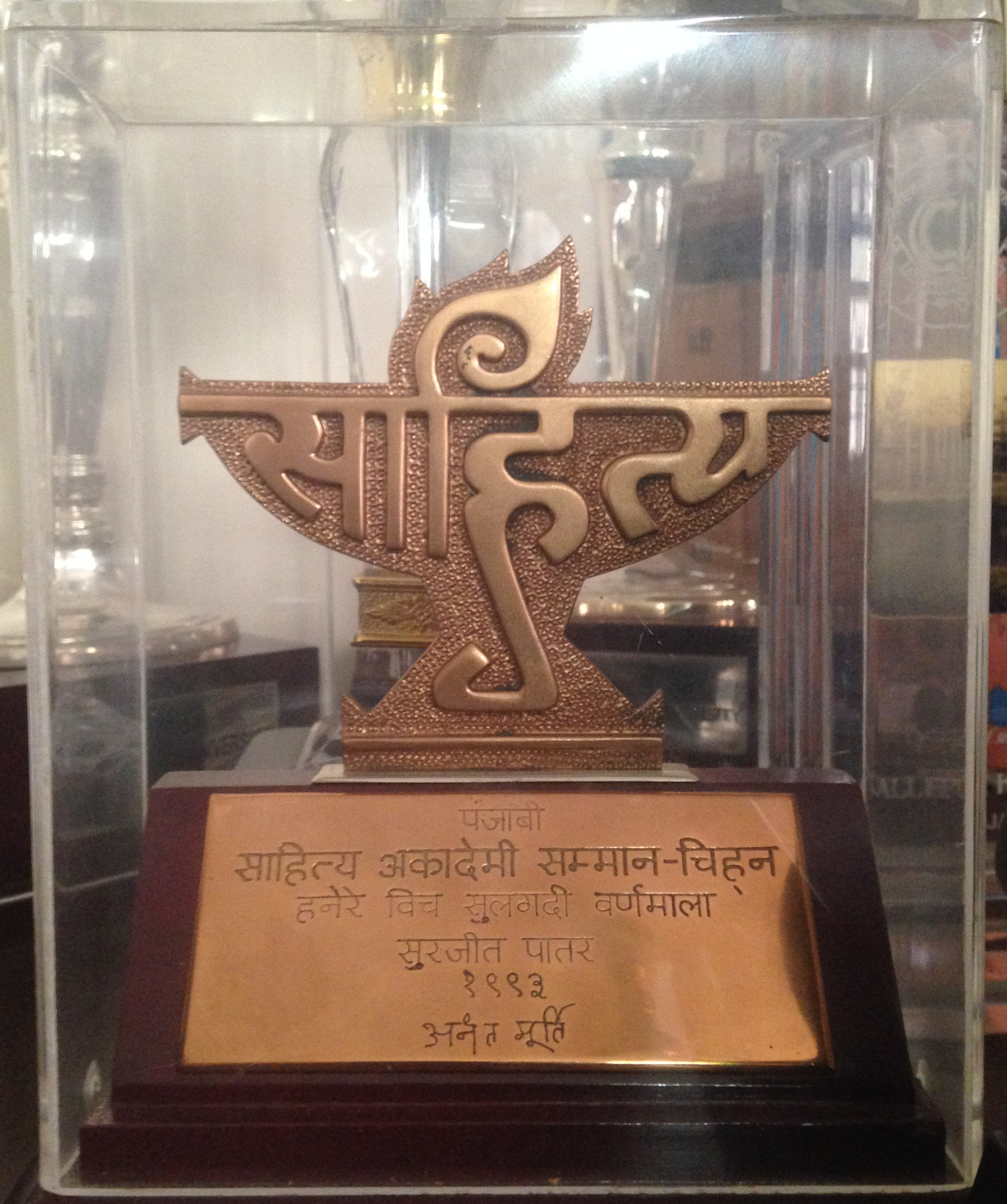
- Awarded for: Literary award in India
- Sponsored by: Sahitya Akademi, Government of India
- Reward: ₹1 lakh (US$1,100)
- First award: 1955
- Final award: 2024

Highlights
- Total awarded: 68
- First winner: R. Narayana Panickar
- Most Recent winner: K. Jayakumar
- Website: Official website

Part of a series on

Sahitya Akademi Awards
Category
Sahitya Akademi Award winners by language
- Assamese
- Bengali
- Bodo
- Dogri
- English
- Gujarati
- Hindi
- Kannada
- Kashmiri
- Konkani
- Maithili
- Malayalam
- Marathi
- Meitei (Manipuri)
- Nepali
- Odia
- Punjabi
- Rajasthani
- Sanskrit
- Santali
- Sindhi
- Tamil
- Telugu
- Urdu
Sahitya Akademi Translation Prizes
- Assamese
- Bengali
- Bodo
- Dogri
- English
- Gujarati
- Hindi
- Kannada
- Kashmiri
- Konkani
- Maithili
- Malayalam
- Marathi
- Meitei (Manipuri)
- Nepali
- Odia
- Punjabi
- Rajasthani
- Sanskrit
- Santali
- Sindhi
- Tamil
- Telugu
- Urdu
Sahitya Akademi Yuva Puraskar
- Assamese
- Bengali
- Bodo
- Dogri
- English
- Gujarati
- Hindi
- Kannada
- Kashmiri
- Konkani
- Maithili
- Malayalam
- Meitei (Manipuri)
- Marathi
- Nepali
- Odia
- Punjabi
- Rajasthani
- Sanskrit
- Santali
- Sindhi
- Tamil
- Telugu
- Urdu
Sahitya Akademi Bal Sahitya Puraskar
- Assamese
- Bengali
- Bodo
- Dogri
- English
- Gujarati
- Hindi
- Kannada
- Kashmiri
- Konkani
- Maithili
- Malayalam
- Meitei (Manipuri)
- Marathi
- Nepali
- Odia
- Punjabi
- Rajasthani
- Sanskrit
- Santali
- Sindhi
- Tamil
- Telugu
- Urdu
Related
- Eighth Schedule to the Constitution of India
- Official Languages Commission
- List of languages by number of native speakers in India

Sahitya Akademi Award has been given each year, since 1955, by Sahitya Akademi (India's National Academy of Letters), to Indian writers for their outstanding books of literary merit published in any of the 24 major Indian languages. The following Malayalam language writers have won the award.

== Winners ==
Year	Recipients	Works	Genre	Image
1955	R. Narayana Panickar	Bhasha Sahitya Charitram	History of Literature	
1956	I. C. Chacko, Illiparambil	Paniniya Pradyotam	Commentary	–
1957	Thakazhi Sivasankara Pillai	Chemmeen	Novel	
1958	K. P. Kesava Menon	Kazhinja Kaalam	Autobiography	
1960	Uroob (P. C. Kuttikrishnan)	Sundarikalum Sundaranmarum	Novel	
1963	G. Sankara Kurup	Viswadarsanam	Poetry	
1964	P. Kesava Dev	Ayalkkar	Novel	
1965	N. Balamani Amma	Muthassi	Poetry	
1966	K. M. Kuttikrishna Marar	Kala Jeevitham Thanne	Essays	
1967	P. Kunhiraman Nair	Thamarathoni	Poetry	
1969	Edasseri Govindan Nair	Kavile Pattu	Poetry	
1970	M. T. Vasudevan Nair	Kaalam	Novel	
1971	Vyloppilli Sreedhara Menon	Vida	Poetry	
1972	S. K. Pottekkatt	Oru Desathinte Katha	Novel	
1973	Akkitham Achuthan Namboothiri	Balidarsanam	Poetry	
1974	Vennikkulam Gopala Kurup	Kamasurabhi	Poetry	–
1975	O. N. V. Kurup	Aksharam	Poetry	
1976	Cherukadu (Cherukad Govinda Pisharodi)	Jeevithappatha	Autobiography	
1977	N. Lalithambika Antharjanam	Agnisakshi	Novel	–
1978	B. Sugathakumari	Ratrimazha	Poetry	
1979	N. V. Krishna Warrier	Vallatholinte Kavyasilpam	Literary criticism	–
1980	Punathil Kunhabdulla	Smaraka Silakal	Novel	
1981	Vilasini (M. K. Menon)	Avakasikal	Novel	–
1982	V. K. N.	Payyan Kathakal	Short stories	–
1983	S. Guptan Nair	Thiranjedutha Prabandhangal	Essays	–
1984	K. Ayyappa Paniker	Ayyappa Panikkarute Kritikal	Poetry	
1985	Sukumar Azhikode	Tathvamasi	Critical study	
1986	M. Leelavathy	Kavitadwani	Critical study	
1987	N. Krishna Pillai	Prathipathram Bhashanabhedam	Literary criticism	
1988	E. Harikumar	Dinosarinte Kutty	Short stories	–
1988	C. Radhakrishnan	Spandamapinikale Nandi	Novel	
1989	Olappamanna Subramanian Namboothirippad	Nizhalana	Poetry	
1990	O. V. Vijayan	Gurusagaram	Novel	
1991	M. P. Sankunni Nair	Chhatravum Chamaravum	Criticism	–
1992	M. Mukundan	Daivathinte Vikruthikal	Novel	
1993	N. P. Mohammed	Daivathinte Kannu	Novel	–
1994	Vishnunarayanan Namboothiri	Ujjayiniyile Rappakalukal	Poetry	–
1995	Thikkodiyan (P. Kunjananandan Nair)	Arangu Kanatha Natan	Autobiography	–
1996	T. Padmanabhan	Gowri	Short stories	
1997	Anand (P. Satchidanandan)	Govardhante Yatrakal	Novel	
1998	Kovilan (V. V. Ayyappan)	Thattakam	Novel	
1999	C. V. Sreeraman	Sreeramante Kathakal	Short stories	–
2000	R. Ramachandran	R. Ramachandrante Kavithakal	Poetry	–
2001	Attoor Ravi Varma	Attoor Ravi Varmayute Kavitakal	Poetry	
2002	K. G. Sankara Pillai	K.G. Sankara Pillayude Kavitakal	Poems	
2003	Sara Joseph	Aalahayude Penmakkal	Novel	
2004	Paul Zachariah	Zachariyayute Kathakal	Short Stories	
2005	G. V. Kakkanadan	Jappana Pukayila	Short Stories	
2006	M. Sukumaran	Chuvanna Chinnangal	Short stories	–
2007	Sethu (A. Sethumadhavan)	Adayalangal	Novel	
2008	K. P. Appan	Madhuram Ninte Jeevitham	Essays	
2009	U. A. Khader	Thrikottoor Peruma	Novelite	
2010	M. P. Veerendra Kumar	Haimavatha Bhoovil	Travelogue	
2011	M. K. Sanu	Basheer: Ekantha Veedhiyile Avadhoothan	Biography	
2012	K. Satchidanandan	Marannu Vecha Vasthukkal	Poems	
2013	M. N. Paloor	Kathayillathavante Katha	Autobiography	–
2014	Subhash Chandran	Manushyanu Oru Aamukham	Novel	
2015	K. R. Meera	Aarachaar	Novel	
2016	Prabha Varma	Shyamamaadhavam	Poetry	
2017	K. P. Ramanunni	Daivathinte Pusthakam	Novel	
2018	S. Ramesan Nair	Guru Pournami	Poetry	
2019	V. Madhusoodanan Nair	Achan Piranna Veedu	Poetry	
2020	Omchery N. N. Pillai	Aakasmikam	Memoir	–
2021	George Onakkoor	Hrudayaragangal	Memoir	
2022	M. Thomas Mathew	Asante Seethayanam	Criticism	
2023	E. V. Ramakrishnan	Malayala Novelinte Deshakalangal	Study	–
2024	K. Jayakumar	Pingalakeshini	Poetry	
2025	N. Prabhakaran	Maayaamanushyar	Novel	

Note: No awards in 1959, 1961, and 1968.

== See also ==
- Sahitya Akademi Award for Children's Literature
- Kerala Sahitya Akademi Award
