= Padmarajan Award =

Annual award given by the Padmarajan Memorial Trust

The Padmarajan Award (Padmarajan Puraskaram) is an annual awarded instituted by Padmarajan Memorial Trust in India in memory of author and filmmaker P. Padmarajan. The award was initially given for two categories—Best Short Story and Best Feature Film—but has since included new categories—Best Novel, Best Director and Best Screenwriter.

== Award for Short Story (1992–present) ==
Year	Recipient	Work
1992	M. Sukumaran	Pithru Tharpanam
1993	N. S. Madhavan	Thiruthu
1994	Sethu	Uyarangalil
1995	N. Mohanan	Makan
1996	T. Padmanabhan	Puzha Kadannu Marangalude Idayilekk
1997	E. Harikumar	Pachhapayyine Pidikkan
1998	M. T. Vasudevan Nair	Kaazhcha
1999	K. P. Ramanunni	Jaathi Chodikkuka
2000	Ashita	Thathagatha
2001	M. Mukundan	Valayunna Varakal
2002	K. A. Sebastian	Drishtantham
2003	S. V. Venugopan Nair	Bandhanasthanaya Anirudhan
2004	Santhosh Echikkanam	Roadil Palikkenda Niyamangal
2005	K. P. Nirmal Kumar	Jaran / Avanoru Poojyapaadan
2006	Chandramathi	Oru Navavadhuvinte Jeevithathil Graham Greeninte Prasakthi
2007	Shihabuddin Poythumkadavu	Taj Mahalile Raavukal
2008	K. R. Meera	Guillotine
2009	Zacharia	Alfonsammayude Maranavum Shavasamskaaravum
2010	Ashokan Charuvil	Amazon
2011	P. Surendran	Gowthama Vishadayogam
2012	E. K. Sheeba	Play Station
2013	Anand	Kathirippu
2014	Socrates K. Valath	Nyaayavidhi
2015	—	—
2016	—	—
2017	N. Prabhakaran	Kali Pathalom
2018	E. Santhosh Kumar	Narakangalude Upama
2019	Sarah Joseph	Nee
2020	K. Rekha	Angamaliyile Mangakariyum Ninte Appavum Veenjum
2022	V. J. James	Velli Kashu
2023	Unni R.	Abhinjanam
2024	P. S. Rafeeque	Idamalayile Yakoob
2025	Shanoj R. Chandran	Arapathiri

== Award for Novel (2019–present) ==
Year	Recipient	Work
2019	Subhash Chandran	Samudrasila
2020	Manoj Kuroor	Murinavu
2022	M. Mukundan	Ningal
2023	G. R. Indugopan	Aano
2024	S. Hareesh	Pattunool Puzhu
2025	Chandramathi	Ozhukathe Oru Puzha

== Award for Cinema (1992–2019) ==
Year	Film	Director	Writer
1992	Daivathinte Vikrithikal	Lenin Rajendran	M. Mukundan, Lenin Rajendran
1993	Vidheyan	Adoor Gopalakrishnan	Adoor Gopalakrishnan
1994	Parinayam	Hariharan	M. T. Vasudevan Nair
1995	Kathapurushan	Adoor Gopalakrishnan	Adoor Gopalakrishnan
1996	Desadanam	Jayaraj	Madampu Kunjukuttan
1997	Bhoothakkannadi	Lohithadas	Lohithadas
1998	Garshom	P. T. Kunju Muhammed	P. T. Kunju Muhammed, K. A. Mohandas
1999	Punaradhivasam	V. K. Prakash	P. Balachandran
2000	Susanna	T. V. Chandran	T. V. Chandran
2001	Sesham	T. K. Rajeev Kumar	T. K. Rajeev Kumar
2002	Nizhalkuthu	Adoor Gopalakrishnan	Adoor Gopalakrishnan
2003	Padam Onnu Oru Vilapam	T. V. Chandran	T. V. Chandran
2004	Kaazhcha	Blessy	Blessy
2005	Chandranilekkoru Vazhi	Biju Varkey	Biju Varkey, K.G Pradeep, Suresh Kochammini
2006	Drishtantham	M. P. Sukumaran Nair	M. P. Sukumaran Nair
2007	Thaniye	Babu Thiruvalla	Babu Thiruvalla, Nedumudi Venu
2008	Thirakkatha	Ranjith	Ranjith
2009	Madhyavenal	Madhu Kaithapram	Anil Mughathala
2010	Chitrasutram	Vipin Vijay	Vipin Vijay
2011	Indian Rupee	Ranjith	Ranjith
2012	Chayilyam	Manoj Kana	Manoj Kana
2013	CR No: 89	Sudevan	Sudevan
2014	Ain	Sidhartha Siva	Sidhartha Siva
2015	Pathemari	Salim Ahamed	Salim Ahamed
2016	Maheshinte Prathikaaram	Dileesh Pothan	Syam Pushkaran
2017	Mayaanadhi	Aashiq Abu	Syam Pushkaran, Dileesh Nair
2018	Sudani from Nigeria	Zakariya Mohammed	Zakariya Mohammed, Muhsin Parari
2019	Kumbalangi Nights	Madhu C Narayanan	Syam Pushkaran

== Award for Best Director (2020–present) ==
Year	Recipient	Film
2020	Jeo Baby	The Great Indian Kitchen
2022	Lijo Jose Pellissery	Nanpakal Nerathu Mayakkam
2023	Anand Ekarshi	Aattam
2024	Fasil Muhammed	Feminichi Fathima
2025	Dinjith Ayyathan	Eko

== Award for Best Screenwriter (2020–present) ==
Year	Recipient	Film
2020	Jayaraj	Hasyam
2022	Shruthi Sharanyam	B 32 Muthal 44 Vare
2023	Anand Ekarshi	Aattam
2024	Fasil Muhammed	Feminichi Fathima
2025	Bahul Ramesh	Eko
