= Odakkuzhal Award =

Indian literary award

- Awarded for: Indian literary award
- Location: Kerala
- Country: India
- First award: 1969

Odakkuzhal Award is an Indian literary award given every year to a writer for a particular outstanding work in Malayalam–language. The award was initiated in 1969 by poet G. Sankara Kurup to commemorate the Jnanpith Award he had won.

== Awardees ==
Year	Recipient	Work	Ref.
1969	Vennikkulam Gopala Kurup	Tulsidasa Ramayanam (Malayalam translation)	
1970	O. V. Vijayan	Khasakkinte Itihasam	
1971	Vyloppilli Sreedhara Menon	Vida	
1972	N. Krishna Pillai	Thiranjedutha Prabandhangal	
1973	Akkitham Achuthan Namboothiri	Nimisha Kshetram	
1974	K. Surendran	Maranam Durbalam	
1975	V. K. Govindan Nair	V. K. Govindan Nairude Krithikal	
1976	Nalankal Krishna Pillai	Krishna Tulasi	
1977	Lalithambika Antharjanam	Agnisakshi	
1978	Kainikkara Kumara Pillai	Naatakeeyam	
1979	M. Leelavathy	Varnaraji	
1980	P. Bhaskaran	Ottakkambiyulla Thamburu	
1981	Vilasini	Avakasikal	
1982	Sugathakumari	Ambalamani	
1983	Vishnunarayanan Namboothiri	Mukhamevide	
1984	G. Kumara Pillai	Sapthaswaram	
1985	N. N. Kakkad	Saphalamee Yathra	
1986	Kadavanad Kuttikrishnan	Kalimuttam	
1987	Yusufali Kechery	Kechery Puzha	
1988	Olappamanna	Nizhalana	
1989	M. P. Sankunni Nair	Chhathravum Chamaravum	
1990	O. N. V. Kurup	Mrigaya	
1991	P. Narayana Kurup	Nishagandhi	
1992	Thikkodiyan	Arangu Kanatha Nadan	
1993	M. T. Vasudevan Nair	Vanaprastham	
1994	N. S. Madhavan	Higuita	
1995	T. Padmanabhan	Kadal	
1996	Anand	Govardhanante Yathrakal	
1997	M. P. Veerendra Kumar	Athmavilekkoru Theerthayathra	
1998	Asha Menon	Paraga Koshangal	
1999	Chandramathi	Rain Deer	
2000	Satchidanandan	Thiranjedutha Kavithakal	
2001	Ayyappa Paniker	Ayyappa Paniker Kavithakal	
2002	Mundur Krishnankutty	Enne Veruthe Vittalum	
2003	Zacharia	Thiranjedutha Kathakal	
2004	P. Surendran	Chinese Market	
2005	Njeralathu Surendran; Kalamandalam Padmanabhan Nair	Naatyacharyante Jeevithamudrakal	
2006	C. Radhakrishnan	Theekkadal Kadanju Thirumadhuram	
2007	N. K. Desam	Mudra	
2008	K. G. Sankara Pillai	K. G. S. Kavithakal	
2009	Sreekumaran Thampi	Ammakku Oru Tharattu	
2010	Unnikrishnan Puthur	Anubhavangalude Nerrekhakal	
2011	Subhash Chandran	Manushyanu Oru Amukham	
2012	Sethu	Marupiravi	
2013	K. R. Meera	Aarachaar	
2014	Rafeeq Ahamed	Rafeeq Ahammedinte Kruthikal	
2015	S. Joseph	Chandranodoppam	
2016	M. A. Rahman	Oro Jeevanum Vilappettathaanu	
2017	Aymanam John	Aymanam Johninte Kathakal	
2018	E. V. Ramakrishnan	Malayala Novalinte Desakalangal	
2019	N. Prabhakaran	Mayamanushyar	
2021	Sarah Joseph	Budhini	
2022	Ambikasuthan Mangad	Pranavayu	
2023	P. N. Gopikrishnan	Kavitha Mamsabhojiyanu	
2024	K. Aravindakshan	Gopa	
2025	E.P. Rajagopalan	Ulkatha	
