= 2013 Kerala Sahitya Akademi Awards =

Indian literary awards

Kerala Sahitya Akademi Award
- Awarded for: Outstanding books of literary merit
- Date: 19 December 2014
- Location: Thrissur
- Country: India
- Presented by: Kerala Sahitya Akademi
- First award: 1958

The 2013 Kerala Sahitya Akademi Award was announced on 19 December 2014.The award has been given each year since 1958, by the Kerala Sahitya Akademi (Kerala Literary Academy), to a Malayalam writer for a book of outstanding literary merit.

== Winners ==
Category	Recipient	Work
Poetry	K R Tony	O! Nishada
Novel	K. R. Meera	Aarachaar
Story	Thomas Joseph	Marichavar Cinema Kanukayanu
Drama	Rafeekh Mangalassery	Jinnu Krisnan
Literary criticism	Sunil P. Ilayidom	Ajnjathavumayulla Abhimukham
Autobiography/Biography	Bhagyalakshmi	Swarabhedangal
Travelogue	P. Surendran	Gramapathakal
Sree Padmanabhaswamy Award for Children’s Literature	Sippy Pallippuram	Unnikalkku Noottiyettu Gurudeva Kathakal
Scholarly Literature	Dr. K Rajasekharan Nair	Samsmruthi
Translation	N. Moosakutty	Ulysses
Overall Contribution	P. R. Nathan, S. K. Vasanthan, D. Sreemaan Namboothiri, K. P. Sashidharan, M. D. Rathnamma	

== Endowments ==
- I. C. Chacko Award: M. N. Karasseri (Thaymozhi, Study)
- C. B. Kumar Award: Adoor Gopalakrishnan (Cinema Samskaram, Essay)
- K.R. Namboodiri Award: Dr. J. P. Prajith (Thanthrasahityam)
- Kanakasree Award:Dr K Sampreetha (Neettezhuthu, Poetry)
- Geetha Hiranyan Award: Jacob Abraham (Tattoo, Poetry)
- G. N. Pillai Award: Saji James (Silent Valley: Oru Paristhithi Samarathinte Charitam, Nonfiction)

== Fellowship ==
- Yusuf Ali Kechery
- N. S. Madhavan
