= K. R. Meera =

Indian writer

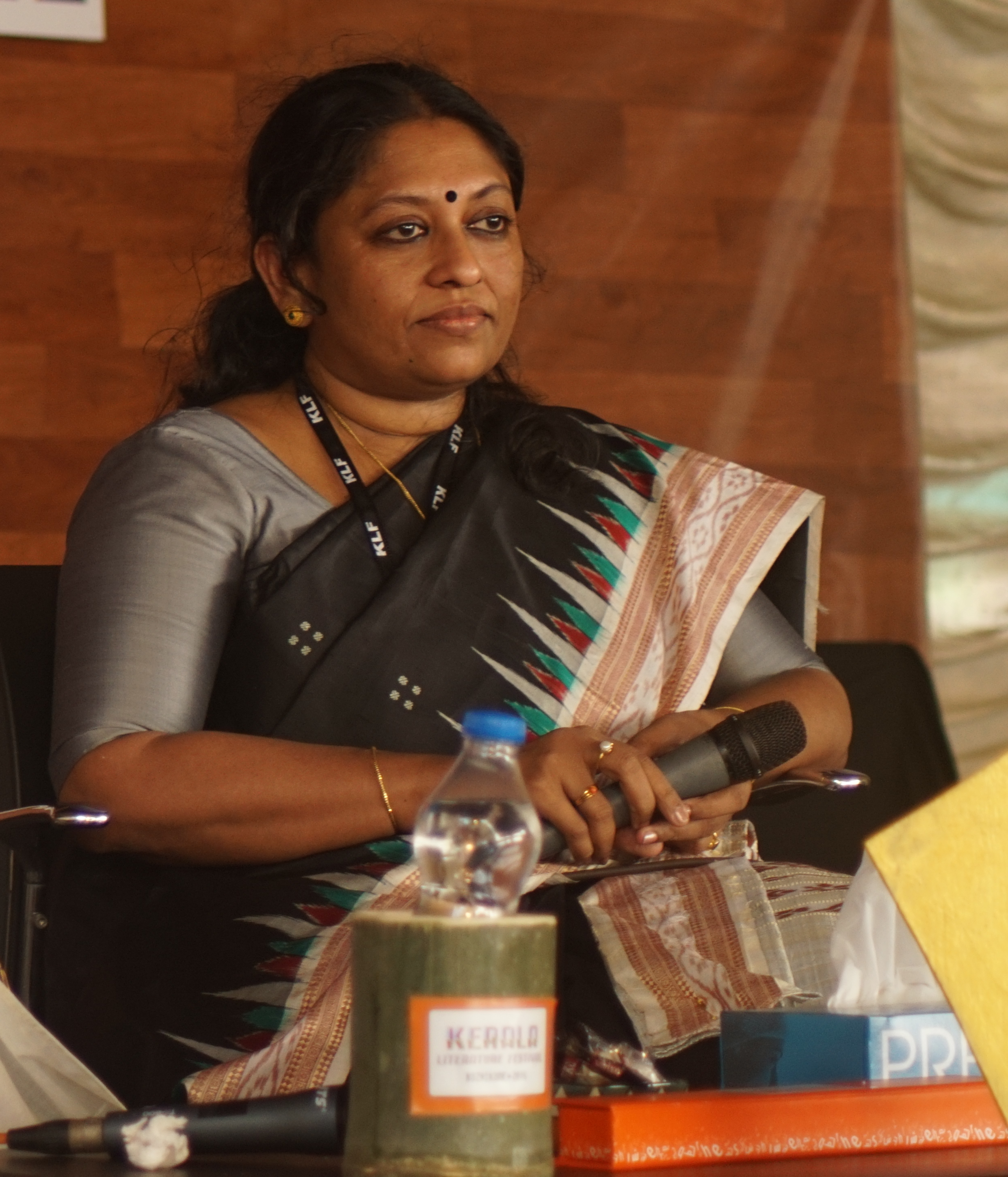
- K.R. Meera at Kerala Literature Festival 2016
- Born: 19 February 1970 (age 56); Sasthamkotta, Kollam district, Kerala, India
- Occupations: Novelist, short story writer, journalist, screenplay writer, columnist
- Spouse: M. S. Dileep
- Children: 1
- Writing career
- Genres: Novel, short story
- Notable works: Ave Maria, Aarachaar
- Notable awards: Kendra Sahitya Akademi Award; Kerala Sahitya Akademi Award; Odakkuzhal Award; Vayalar Award

K. R. Meera (Kunnathur Meera) (born 19 February 1970) is an Indian author and journalist, who writes in Malayalam. She was born in Sasthamkotta, Kunnathur taluk, Kollam district in Kerala. She worked as a journalist in Malayala Manorama but later resigned to concentrate more on writing. She started writing fiction in 2001 and her first short story collection Ormayude Njarambu was published in 2002. Since then she has published five collections of short stories, two novellas, five novels and two children's books. She won the Kerala Sahitya Akademi Award in 2009 for her short-story, Ave Maria. Her novel Aarachaar (2012) published by DC Books received several awards including the Kerala Sahitya Akademi Award (2013), Odakkuzhal Award (2013), Vayalar Award (2014) and Kendra Sahitya Akademi Award (2015). It was also shortlisted for the 2016 DSC Prize for South Asian Literature.

== Early and personal life ==
Meera was born in Sasthamkotta, Kollam district in Kerala as the daughter of Ramachandran Pillai and Amritakumari, both professors. She read a variety of Malayalam books and started writing as early as seven or eight years old and wrote short stories and poems. Her mother's friend, M. D. Ratnamma (എം.ഡി. രത്നമ്മ), a novelist, inspired her and gave an impression to her that a writer "is someone very special." She completed her pre-degree from Dewaswom Board College, Sasthamcotta. She passed her master's degree in Communicative English from Gandhigram Rural Institute, Dindigul, Tamil Nadu.

Meera lives in Kottayam with her husband M.S. Dileep, who is a journalist with Malayala Manorama. Their only daughter Shruti was a residential student at the Rishi Valley School, Andhra Pradesh.

== Journalistic career ==
In 1993, she joined as a journalist in Kottayam-based Malayalam daily Malayala Manorama, and was the first female journalist to be hired at the newspaper. In 2006, following publication of several stories, Meera gave up journalism to take up writing as a full-time occupation. She was the senior sub-editor of Malayala Manorama when she resigned. During her journalistic career, she published many special stories which won her numerous awards and recognitions. She won the PUCL Human Rights National Award for Journalism in 1998 for an investigative series on the plight of women labourers in Kerala. This series also won the Chowara Parameswaran Award instituted by Kerala Press Academy. A series on children won her the Deepalaya National Journalism Award for Child Rights in 2001.

== Literary career ==
Meera's first published work was a story submitted to Mathrubhumi, a magazine, in 2000. Her first short story collection Ormayude Njarambu was published in 2002. This collection won the Gita Hiranyan Endowment Award instituted by Kerala Sahitya Akademi and the Ankanam Literary Award. Her next book Mohamanja was published in 2004. It was translated into English by J. Devika as Yellow is the Colour of Longing (Penguin, 2011). The title story, which explores the absurdity of desire, was also published in Arshilata: Women's Fiction from India and Bangladesh (ed. Niaz Zaman). She won the Kerala Sahitya Akademi Award in 2008 for the collection Ave Maria. The title story of the book is a brutal glimpse into the debris of Kerala's Communist ideology, the fault lines left behind in families. A translation of this story was included in the book First Proof 5, The Penguin Book of New Writing from India (Penguin, 2010). Her other collections include K. R. Meerayude Kathakal, a collection of major 26 stories published so far, including Machakathe Thachan, Ormayude Njarambu, Mohamanja, Ave Maria, Karineela, Malakhayude Marukukal, Soorpanakha, Alif Laila and Ottapalam Kadakkuvolam.

Her early novels include Aa Maratheyum Marannu Marannu Njan, Meera Saadhu, Nethronmeelanam and Yudasinte Suvishesham. Meera Sadhu (DC Books, 2008) tells the story of an IIT graduate abandoned at a Krishna temple after going through some torrid times in her married life. Five of her short novels have been compiled into a single book titled Meerayude Novellakal (2014).

Aarachaar (Hangwoman in English) widely regarded as her masterpiece, was originally serialised in Madhyamam Weekly and was published as a book by DC Books in 2012. Set in Bengal, it tells the story of a family of executioners with a long lineage, beginning in the fourth century BC. The protagonist of the novel, Chetna, is a strong and tenacious woman who struggles to inherit this profession. According to noted literary critic M. Leelavathy, Aarachaar is one of the best literary works produced in Malayalam and follows the legacy of O. V. Vijayan's classic work Khasakkinte Itihasam. The novel received the 2013 Kerala Sahitya Akademi Award. It was also awarded the prestigious Odakkuzhal Award in 2013, Vayalar Award in 2014 and Sahitya Akademi Award in 2015. The novel has sold more than 38,000 copies (as of January 2015). The novel was translated into English by J. Devika under the title Hangwoman: Everyone Loves a Good Hanging (Hamish Hamilton, 2014). Hangwoman was shortlisted for the prestigious DSC Prize for South Asian Literature 2016. Her latest novel Sooryane Aninja Oru Stree is being published in Vanitha magazine.

She has also been noted as a screenplay writer of four serials. She was credited as the associate in writing for the film Ore Kadal, a National Award winner. She is also a well-known column-writer in Malayalam.

== Influences ==
Meera cites E. V. Krishna Pillai, Kamala Das, T. Padmanabhan, S. V. Venugopan Nair, Anand, M. Mukundan, C. V. Sreeraman, O. N. V. Kurup, Sugathakumari, Paul Zacharia, and has "a long list" of Malayalam authors that influenced her works. Amongst non-Indian writers, she cites Maxim Gorky, Ayn Rand, and particularly Gabriel Garcia Marquez as a primary influences.

== Themes ==
Her work explores themes relating to patriarchy, discrimination, and individuality, focusing on the inner lives of women and challenging traditional power dynamics. Meera has described her work as engaging with her political environment, stating, "Every writer is a political writer. It is very difficult for any writer to shut down from what is happening in and around society. And as a writer, we reflect on what's happening in society through our writing. Writing's a mixture of conscious and unconscious creative thinking— intuition and craft—it feels very unnatural to analyse it in any other kind of systematic way.”

== Awards and honours ==
- 2004: Lalithambika Sahitya Award
- 2004: Gita Hiranyan Endowment Award by Kerala Sahitya Akademi - Ormayude Njarampu
- 2009: Kerala Sahitya Akademi Award for Story - Ave Maria
- 2013: Odakkuzhal Award - Aarachaar
- 2013: Kerala Sahitya Akademi Award for Novel - Aarachaar
- 2014: Vayalar Award - Aarachaar
- 2015: Kendra Sahitya Akademi Award - Aarachaar
- 2016: Shortlisted for the DSC Prize for South Asian Literature - Hangwoman (Translated by J. Devika)
- 2018: Muttathu Varkey Award - Aarachaar

== Bibliography ==
=== Novels ===
- Nethronmeelanam (The Unseeing Idol of Light)
- Meerasadhu (The Poison of Love)
- Yudasinte Suvishesham [The Gospel of Yudas]
- Malakayude Marukukal
- Karineela
- Aa Maratheyum Marannu Marannu Njan (And Slowly Forgetting that Tree)
- Aarachaar (2012) (Hangwoman: Everyone Loves a Good Hanging)
- Sooryane Aninja Oru Sthree (Jezebel)
- Ghathakan (The Assassin)
- Khabar (Qabar)
- Kalachi

=== Collections of short stories ===
- Sarpayajnam G(2001)
- Ormayude Njarambu (2002) (The Vein of Memory)
- Moha Manja (2004) (Yellow is the Colour of Longing)
- Ave Maria
- K. R. Meerayude Kathakal
- Guillotine
- Meerayude Novellakal (2014)
- Penpanjatandram[2016]
- Bhagavante Maranam[2017]

=== Memoirs ===
- Mazhayil Parakkunna Pakshikal
- Ente Jeevitattile Chilar
- Kadhayezhuth
