= Muttathu Varkey Award =

Award for contributions to Malayalam literature

- Award for individual contributions to Malayalam literature
- Awarded for: Literary award in India
- Sponsored by: Muttattu Varkey Foundation
- Rewards: ₹50,000, citation, a statuette
- First award: 1992
- Final award: 2019

Highlights
- Total awarded: 22
- First winner: O. V. Vijayan
- Last winner: Benyamin
- Website: www.muttathuvarkey.com/foundation

Muttathu Varkey Award for contributions to the field of Malayalam literature has been instituted by the Muttattu Varkey Foundation in memory of novelist Muttathu Varkey. The award was instituted in 1992 and as of 2012, it carries a purse of ₹50,000, a citation, and a statuette. The award is usually announced on 28 April (Varkey's birth anniversary) and presented on 28 May (his death anniversary) every year.

The award recognizes a writer's (particularly a novelist's) body of work rather than any one title. In 2015, K. Satchidanandan became the first poet to be selected for the award. The year 2015 was the 75th anniversary of Muttathu Varkey's debut into Malayalam literature with a poem titled ‘‘Aathmanjali’’ and so it was decided to give the award in the field of poetry. In 2016 and 2017, the award was given for screenplay writing and notably in recognition for a particular work unlike previous years.

== Awardees ==
Year	Recipient	Remarks	Ref.
1992	O. V. Vijayan	Khasakinte ethihasam	
1993	Vaikom Muhammad Basheer		
1994	M. T. Vasudevan Nair		
1995	Kovilan		
1996	Kakkanadan		
1997	V. K. N.		
1998	M. Mukundan		
1999	Punathil Kunjabdulla		
2000	Anand		
2001	N. P. Mohammed		
2002	Ponkunnam Varkey		
2003	Sethu		
2004	C. Radhakrishnan		
2005	Zacharia		
2006	Kamala Surayya (Madhavikkutty)		
2007	T. Padmanabhan		
2008	M. Sukumaran		
2009	N. S. Madhavan		
2010	P. Valsala		
2011	Sarah Joseph	Paapathara	
2012	N. Prabhakaran	For Overall contribution	
2013	C. V. Balakrishnan		
2014	Asokan Charuvil		
2015	K. Satchidanandan	"Malayalam"(Poem)	
2016	K. G. George	Work: Irakal	
2017	T. V. Chandran	Work: Ponthan Mada	
2018	K. R. Meera	Work: Aarachar	
2019	Benyamin		
