= Mundur Krishnankutty =

Indian Malayalam–language writer

- Born: Anupurath Krishnankutty; 17 July 1935; Mundur, Palghat, Malabar District, Madras Presidency, British India
- Died: 4 June 2005 (aged 69); Palghat, Kerala, India
- Occupations: Writer, teacher
- Writing career
- Language: Malayalam
- Period: 1956–2005
- Genres: Short story, novel, memoirs

Anupurath Krishnankutty, popularly known as Mundur Krishnankutty (17 July 1935 – 4 June 2005), was a Malayalam writer from Kerala state, India.

== Life ==
He was born in Mundur, Palghat to parents Manakulangara Govinda Pisharody and Anupurath Madhavi Pisharasyar. He attended Parali High School and mastered in English literature at Government Victoria College, Palakkad. He obtained a B.Ed degree from NSS College, Ottapalam and worked as a teacher in Palakkad VVP High School, Palakkad PMG High School and Chittoor Training School.

He wrote his first short story "Kannalichekkan" (Cow boy) in 1956 which was published in Navayugam. The same year another story titled "Ambalavasikal" (Temple workers) was published in the Mathrubhumi Illustrated Weekly. He won many awards including the Odakkuzhal Award, Kerala Sahitya Akademi Award and the Cherukad Award for his short stories.

Krishnankutty died on 4 June 2005.

Several literary organisations have instituted awards in his memory. This includes a literary award presented annually by Mundur Krishnankutty Memorial Trust, another by Nawab Rajendran Samiti (since 2005) and a short story award instituted by Saparya Sahitya Vedi.

== List of works ==
=== Short story collections ===
- Nilappisukkulla Oru Rathriyil
- Aswasathinte Manthracharadu
- Ethratholamennariyathe
- Moonnamathoral
- Enne Veruthe Vittalum
- Kathapurushan
- Avaseshippinte Pakshi
- Ammakku Vendi
- Thannishtathinte Vazhithappukal
- Mundoor Krishnankuttiyude Sampoorna Krithikal (in 2 volumes)
- Evideyo thornnutheerunna mazha

=== Others ===
- Mathuvinte Krishnathanuppu (short novel)
- Ekaki (short novel)
- Manassu Enna Bharam (short novel)
- Oru Adhyapakante Athmagathangal (memoirs)

== Awards ==
- 1996: Cherukad Award–Nilappisukkulla Oru Rathriyil
- 1997: Kerala Sahitya Akademi Award for Story–Nilappisukkulla Oru Rathriyil
- 2003: Odakkuzhal Award–Enne Veruthe Vittalum
