= K. V. Mohan Kumar =

Author

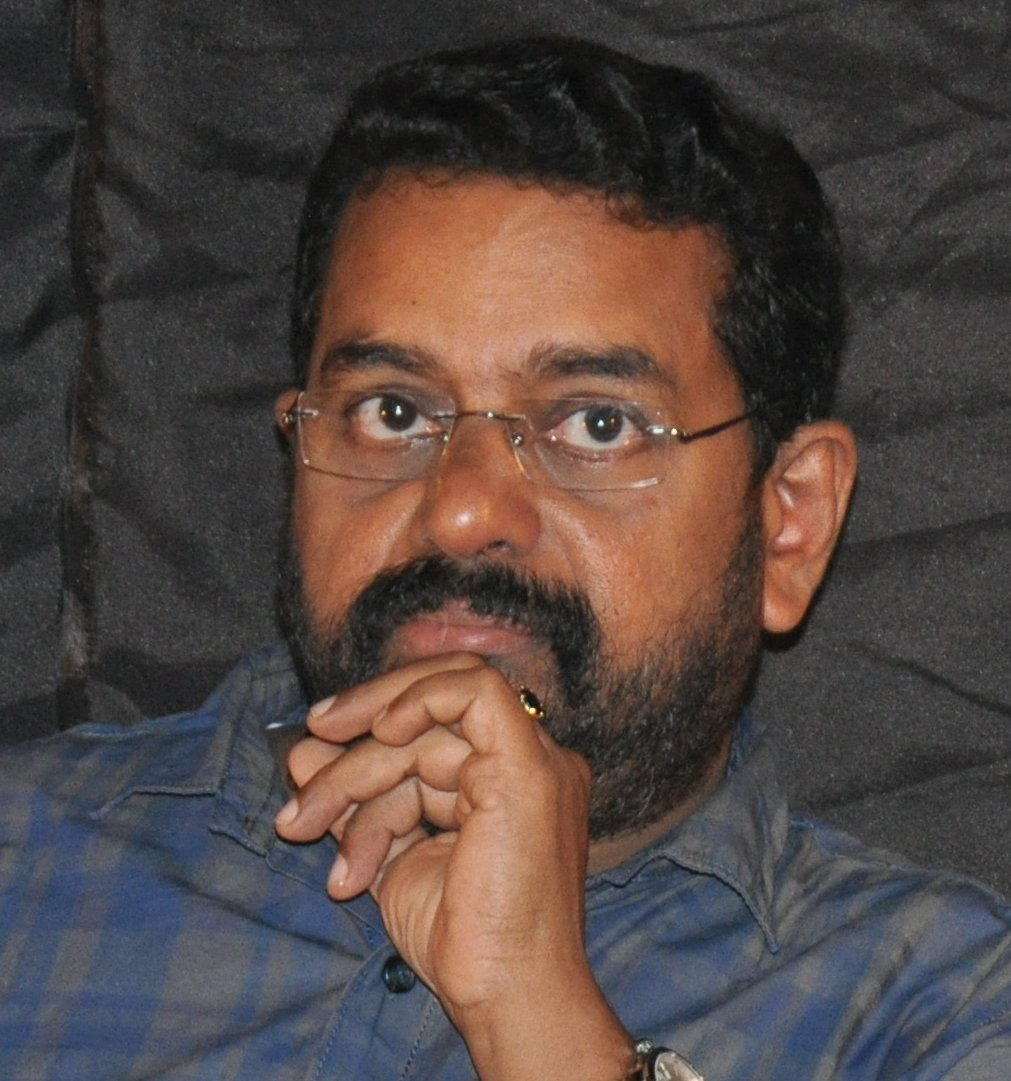

K. V. Mohan Kumar is an Indian writer in Malayalam literature from Alapuzha District in Kerala. He has authored 37 books, including 10 novels and 13 collections of short stories.He scripted for 3 films: Kesu, Aaro Oraal and Clint.

== Life ==
Mohan Kumar was born in Alleppey, as the son of K. Velayudhan Pillai and Lakshmi Kutty Amma. He started his career as a journalist and served as Correspondent and Sub Editor in Kerala Kaumudi and Malayala Manorama for 12 years. He joined the State Civil (Executive) Service in 1993 and his administrative career started as Revenue Divisional officer, Adoor. He was selected to Indian Administrative Service in the Kerala Cadre (2004 batch) and served as District collector in Palghat and Calicut, Rural Development Commissioner, Director of Higher Secondary Education and Director of Public Instruction (DPI) Spl. Secretary, General Education and Chairman, State Food Commission(2018-2023). In 2009, he scripted for the film Kesu, which won National award for best Children’s film. His first novel Sraadhasheham was adapted into a film titled Aaro Oraal .

. Education : School Education: Govt LP school, Alapuzha, Govt UP school, Cherthala South, St Francis Assissi High School, Arthinkal. Pre degree: St.Michael’s College, Cherthala. B.A (Economics) from University of Kerala M.A. (Political Science) from Maduarai Kamaraj University DJ: (PG Diploma in Journalism ) from Rajendra Prasad Institute of Mass Communications, Mumbai MBA: (Master of Businees Administration) From IGNOU, New Delhi

== Works ==
10 Novels

- Sraadhasheham
- Hey Rama
- Jaranum Poochayum
- Ezhamindriyam
- Pranayathinte Moonnam Kannu
- Ushnarashi
- Edalakkudi Pranaya Rekhakal
- Mazhoor Thampan Randam Varavu
- Mahayogi
- Ula

13 Short story collections

- Akam Kazhchakal
- Knavallayile Kuthirakal
- Aliveni Enthu Cheyvu
- Bhoomiyude Anupatham
- Aasannamaranan
- Puzhayute Niram Irul Neelima
- Ente Gramakathakal
- Karappuram Kathakal
- Randu Pasukkachavatakkaar
- Sampoorna Kathakal (1983-2020)
- Soundarya Bilahari
- Kaliyamp

Children's literature

- Appooppan Maravum Aakasha Pookkalum
- Ammuvum Manthrika Petakavum
- Meenukkutti Kanda Lokam
- Undakkannante Kazhchakal

Other works

- Aligayile Kalapam (Novelette)
- Devi Nee Parayarundu / Jeevante Avasanathe Ila (Memoirs)
- Romila Oru Ormachithram (Memoirs)
- Devarathi (Travelogue)
- Manass Nee, Akasavum Nee
- Ramanum Valmeekiyum Njaanum
- Azhal Moodiya Kanyavanangal

Translations in English

- The Third Eye of Love (Novel)
- Man Hunt (Novel)
- End of A Journey (Novel)
- Mother Dove & Magic Box (Children's literature)

== Awards ==
- 2018: Vayalar Award — Ushnaraasi
- 2018: Kerala Sahithya Academy Award
- Kerala State Balasahithya Institute Award for Children 's Literature, 2023
- Kakkanadan Puraskaram, 2022.
- 2020: Kovilan Novel Award
- 2019: Mahakavi P. Kunjiraman Nair Novel Award
- 2019: Ankanam Shamsudheen Smruthi Novel Award
- 2017 O V Vijayan Trust Literary Award
- FOKANA Literary Award
- AIMA Akshara Mudra Award
- Basheer Puraskaram
- K Surendran Novel Award
- Dr KM Tharakan’ Suvarnarekha ‘Sahithya Puraskaram
- Plavila Sahithya Puraskaram
- Sahrudaya Vedi Sahithya Puraskaram
- Thoppil Ravi Sahithya Puraskaram
- PN Panicker Literary Award
- Kakkanadan Award for Literature (2022)
- Rajahamsa Literary Award instituted by Chinchuwada Malayalee Association (CMA), Pune in 2023.
- Kerala State Balasahithya Award for Children’s Literature (Fiction) in 2023
