= M. P. Sankunni Nair =

Indian writer

M. P. Sankunni Nair (1917–2006) is a Sanskrit scholar and critic from Kerala. He was born at Mezhathur near Pattambi in Palakkad District. He studied at the Sanskrit college in Pattambi.

== Awards ==
He won Odakkuzhal Award in 1989 and Kendra Sahitya Akademi Award in 1991 for his work Chathravum Chamaravum. He received Kerala Sahitya Akademi Fellowship in 1994. His works such as `Natyamandapam' and `Chathravum Chamaravum' reflect his deep knowledge of dramaturgy and the Natya Shastra.
