= Asokan Charuvil =

Indian short story writer

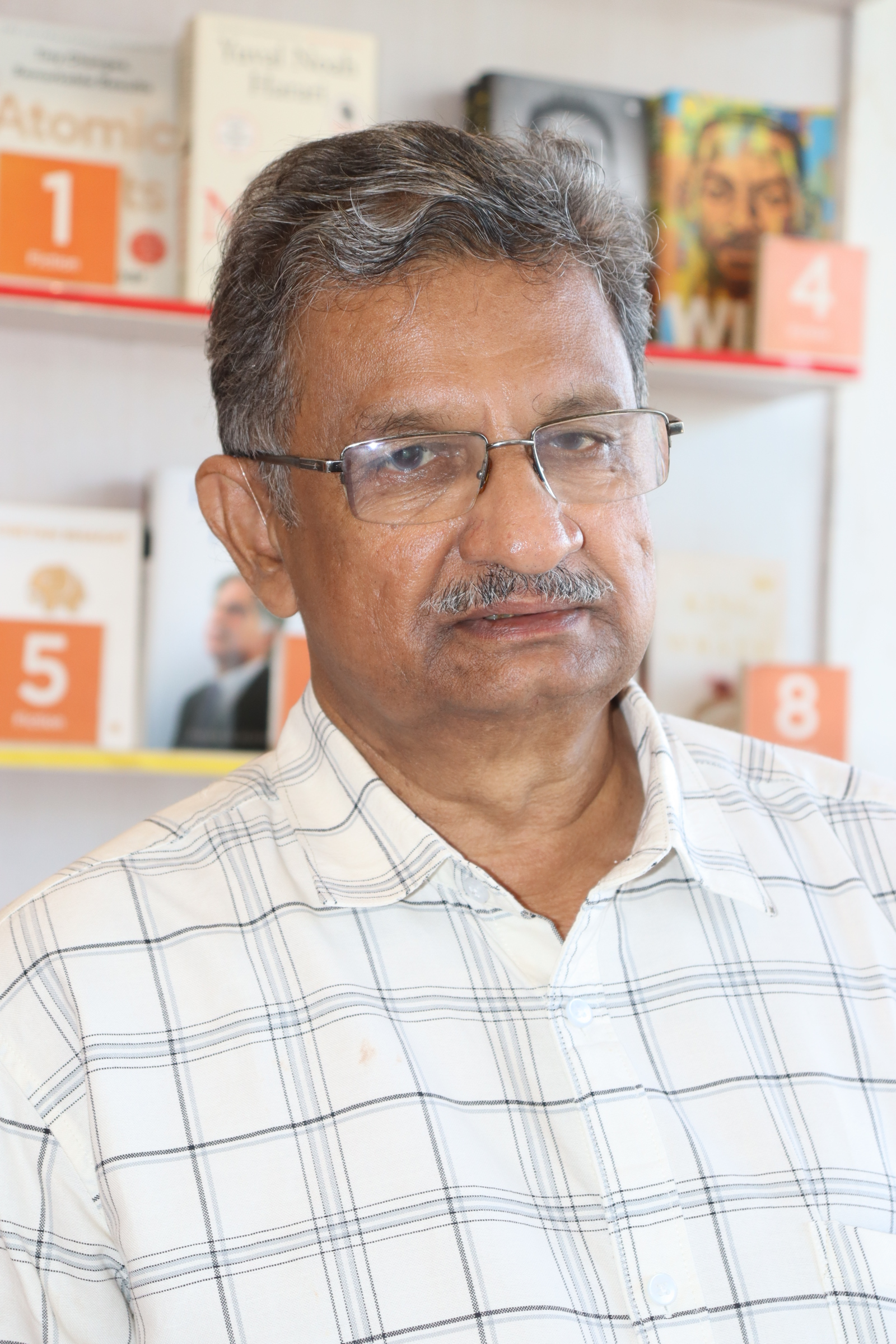
- At the Pukasa conference, Quilon, 2010
- Born: 18 May 1957 (age 69); Kattoor, Thrissur
- Education: Sree Narayana College, Nattika
- Occupation: Short story writer
- Writing career
- Genre: Short story
- Notable awards: Kerala Sahitya Akademi Award; Muttathu Varkey Award; Vayalar Award

Asokan Charuvil is an Indian short story writer in Malayalam-language. He is a recipient of several awards including the Kerala Sahitya Akademi Award and Muttathu Varkey Award.

Born in 1957 in Kattoor in Trichur district of Kerala, he completed his education from Karalam High School, SN College, Nattika and SN Teachers Education Institution, Irinjalakuda. He was an officer in the registration department and was a member of the Kerala Public Service Commission. From 2018, he is the general secretary of Purogamana Kala Sahitya Sangham.

Vayalar award winner Asokan Charuvil speaks in a meeting at Kollam Oct 2024

== List of works ==
- Sooryakanthikalude Nagaram (1987)
- Parichitha Gandhangal (1993)
- Oru Rathrikku Oru Pakal (1996)
- Marichavarude Kadal
- Kathakalile Veedu
- Daivaviswasathe Kurichu Oru Lakhu Upanyasam
- Chimney Velichathil Prakasikkunna Lokam
- Kangaroo Nrutham
- Asokan Charuvilinte Kathakal
- Clerkumarude Jeevitham
- Kattoor Kadavile Kroorakrithyam
- Chathuravum Sthreekalum
- Jalajeevitham
- Thiranjedutha Kathakal
- Kadalkkarayile Veedu
- Amazon
- Kalppanikkaran
- Karappan

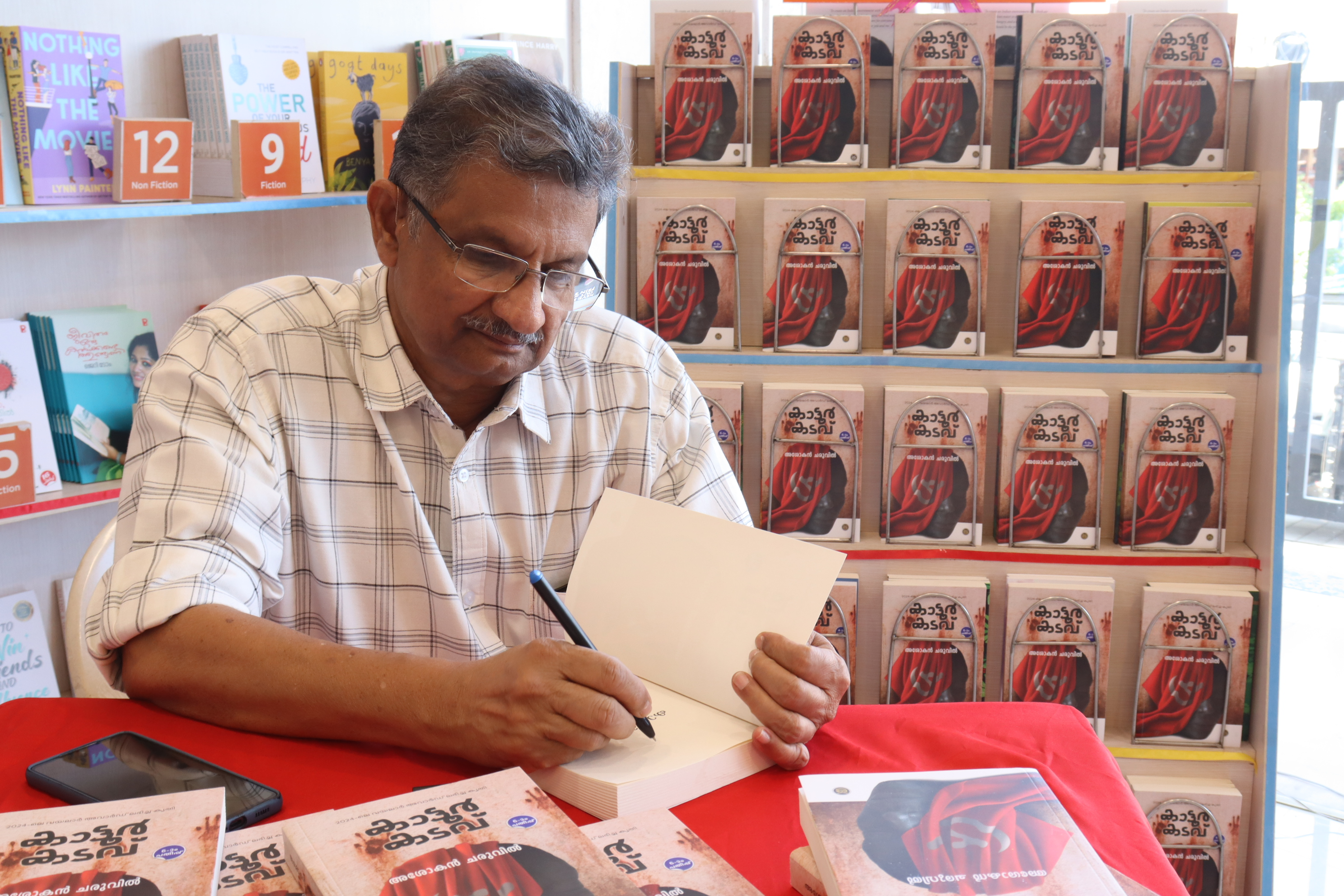
Asokan charuvil Signing his novel for readers in a meeting at kollam

== Awards ==
- 1986: Cherukad Award
- 1993: Abu Dhabi Sakthi Award - Parichitha Gandhangal
- 1995: Edasseri Award – Oru Rathrikku Oru Pakal
- 1998: Kerala Sahitya Akademi Award for Story – Oru Rathrikku Oru Pakal
- 2010: Padmarajan Award – Amazon
- 2014: Muttathu Varkey Award
- 2014: Abu Dhabi Sakthi Award - Novellakal
- 2024: Vayalar Award - Kattoorkadavu
