= Vayalar Award =

Literary award

- Awarded for: Best literary work of an year in Malayalam
- Sponsored by: Vayalar Ramavarma Memorial Trust
- Location: Thiruvananthapuram, Kerala
- Country: India
- Rewards: ₹100,000 and a silver plaque
- First award: 1977
- Final award: 2026

Highlights
- Total awarded: 50
- First winner: Lalithambika Antharjanam
- Last winner: R. Rajasree

The Vayalar Award is a literary award presented annually in Kerala, India, for the best literary work in Malayalam. It was instituted in 1977 by the Vayalar Ramavarma Memorial Trust in memory of poet and lyricist Vayalar Ramavarma (1928-1975). A sum of ₹25,000, a silver plate and a certificate constituted the award originally. The purse has since been raised to ₹100,000. It is presented every year on Ramavarma's death anniversary on 27 October.

== List of awardees ==
Year	Recipient	Work(s)	Image
1977	Lalithambika Antharjanam	Agnisakshi	
1978	P. K. Balakrishnan	Ini Njan Urangatte	
1979	Malayattoor Ramakrishnan	Yanthram	
1980	Thakazhi Sivasankara Pillai	Kayar	
1981	Vyloppilli Sreedhara Menon	Makarakoythu	
1982	O. N. V. Kurup	Uppu	
1983	Vilasini (M. K. Menon)	Avakasikal	
1984	Sugathakumari	Ambalamani	
1985	M. T. Vasudevan Nair	Randamoozham	
1986	N. N. Kakkadu	Saphalameeyathra	
1987	N. Krishna Pillai	Prathipathram Bhashanabhedam	
1988	Thirunalloor Karunakaran	Thirunalloor Karunakarante Kavithakal	
1989	Sukumar Azhikode	Thathwamasi	
1990	C. Radhakrishnan	Munpe Parakkunna Pakshikal	
1991	O. V. Vijayan	Gurusagaram	
1992	M. K. Sanu	Changambuzha: Nakshathrangalude Snehabhajanam	
1993	Anand	Marubhoomikal Undakunnathu	
1994	K. Surendran	Guru	
1995	Thikkodiyan	Arangu Kanatha Nadan	
1996	Perumbadavam Sreedharan	Oru Sankeerthanam Pole	
1997	Madhavikutty (Kamala Surayya)	Neermathalam Pootha Kalam	
1998	S. Guptan Nair	Srishtiyum Srishtavum	
1999	Kovilan	Thattakam	
2000	T. Padmanabhan	Puzha Kadannu Marangalude Idayilekku	
2001	M. V. Devan	Devaspandanam	
2002	K. Ayyappapanicker	Ayyappapanickerude Krithikal	
2003	M. Mukundan	Kesavante Vilapangal	
2004	Sarah Joseph	Alahayude Penmakkal	
2005	K. Satchidanandan	Sakshyangal	
2006	Sethu	Adayalangal	
2007	M. Leelavathy	Appuvinte Anweshanam	
2008	M. P. Veerendra Kumar	Haimavathabhuvil	
2009	M. Thomas Mathew	Marar: Lavanyanubhavathinte Yuktishilpam	
2010	Vishnunarayanan Namboothiri	Charulatha	
2011	K. P. Ramanunni	Jeevithathinte Pusthakam	
2012	Akkitham	Anthimahakalam	
2013	Prabha Varma	Shyama Madhavam	
2014	K. R. Meera	Aarachaar	
2015	Subhash Chandran	Manushyanu Oru Aamukham	
2016	U. K. Kumaran	Thakshankunnu Swaroopam	
2017	T. D. Ramakrishnan	Sugandhi Enna Andal Devanayaki	
2018	K. V. Mohan Kumar	Ushnarashi	
2019	V. J. James	Nireeshwaran	
2020	Ezhacherry Ramachandran	Oru Virginian Veyilkaalam	
2021	Benyamin	Manthalirile 20 Communist Varshangal	
2022	S. Hareesh	Meesha	
2023	Sreekumaran Thampi	Jeevitham Oru Pendulum	
2024	Ashokan Charuvil	Kattoor Kadavu	
2025	E. Santhosh Kumar	Thapomayiyude Achan	
2026	R. Rajasree	Aathreyakam	

== See also ==
- List of Malayalam literary awards
