= Makarakoythu =

Poetic collection in Malayalam

Makarakkoythu is one of the famous poetic collection by Malayalam writer Vyloppilli Sreedhara Menon. It is collection consists of eighty poems about the culture of Kerala. It was published in 1980.

== Content ==
The background of most of the poems in this collection are in Thrissur and outskirts. The reason for considering this place is explained in the introduction of the book by the poet, because it is not only the place where he lived but also he loves the place like loving its people. The poet criticizes people and places in this poetry.

== Awards ==
This poetic collection got several awards like,

- Vayalar Award in 1981
