= K. Satchidanandan =

Indian poet

Koyamparambath Satchidanandan
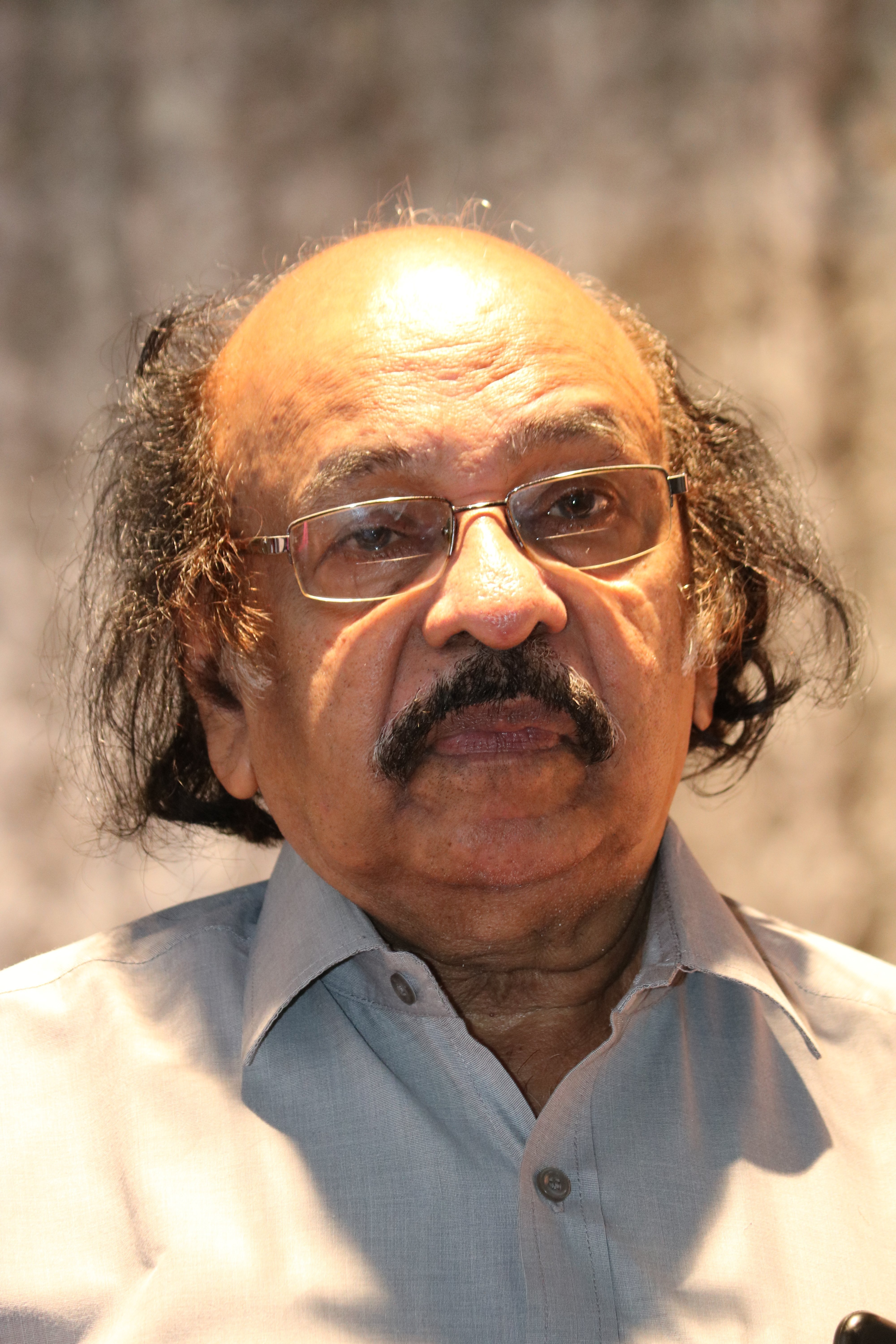
- Born: 28 May 1946 (age 80); Pulloot, Trichur, Kingdom of Cochin
- Writing career
- Genres: Poetry, criticism, travelogue, translation, drama
- Notable awards: Sahitya Akademi Award; Kerala Sahitya Akademi Award; Gangadhar Meher Award

K. Satchidanandan (born 28 May 1946) is an Indian poet and critic, writing in Malayalam and English. A pioneer of modern poetry in Malayalam, a bilingual literary critic, playwright, editor, columnist and translator, he is the former editor of Indian Literature journal and the former secretary of Sahitya Akademi. He is also social advocate for secular anti-caste views, supporting causes like environment, human rights and free software and is a well known speaker on issues concerning contemporary Indian literature. He is the festival director of Kerala Literature Festival.

== Life and career ==
Koyamparambath Satchidanandan was born in 1946 in Pulloot, a village in Kodungallur in the Thrissur District of Kerala.

After his early education in a village school, he was graduated in biology from the Christ College, Irinjalakuda, and had his Masters in English from Maharaja's College, Ernakulam. He obtained his PhD in post-structuralist poetics from the University of Calicut. He joined as a lecturer in English at K.K.T.M. Govt. College, Pulloot in 1968, and moved to Christ College, Irinjalakuda, in 1970 where he became a professor of English. He voluntarily retired from this post in 1992 to take up the editorship of Indian Literature, the English journal of the Indian National Academy in Delhi. In 1996 he was nominated Secretary, the chief executive, of the academy, a post from which he retired in 2006. Later he served as a Consultant to the Indian Government's Department of Higher Education and to the National Translation Mission. He also worked as Director, School of Translation Studies and Training at the Indira Gandhi National Open University, Delhi. He edited 'The Katha Library of Indian Literature', 'The Library of South Asian Literature' and Beyond Borders, a journal of South Asian literature and ideas.

Satchidanandan's literary career began with the publication of 'Kurukshetram', a collection of essays on poetry (1970) and 'Anchusooryan', a collection of poems (1971). Since then he has published several books of poetry, criticism, plays, travelogues and translations of poetry and plays and edited several magazines like 'Jwala', 'Uttaram' and 'Pachakkutira' besides many anthologies of poetry and essays in Malayalam, English, Hindi and Slovenian. He has represented India at several national and international literary events like Valmiki World Poetry Festival (Delhi,1985), Sarajevo Poetry Days (1985), Festival of India in the USSR (1988), Printemps des Poetes, France (2003), Berlin Literary Festival (2005), Frankfurt Book fair (2005, 2006), Paris Book fair (2007), Jaipur International Literary Festival (2008, 9, 10, 11,12), London Book fair (2009), Indo-Arab Literary Festival, Abu Dhabi (2008), Blue Metropolis Literary Festival, Montreal (20110, Hay Festival, Trivandrum, 2011) Rotterdam Poetry Festival (2012), Medellin Poetry Festival (2013), Festival of India in Latin America (2013), Sharjah Book fair (2013) and Vilenica Literary Festival, Slovenia (2014, 2015). This is besides readings in Lahore, Manchester, Dubai, Damascus, Aleppo, Bonn, Rome, Madrid, Avila, Segovia and all major cities in India. One of the most widely anthologised and translated of modern poets in India, he has 32 books of poems in 18 languages. He was given the Indo-Polish Friendship Medal by the Government of Poland in 2005 and the Order of Merit of the Italian Republic in 2006. He was in the Ladbroke list of Nobel probables in 2011.^{[3]} A film on him, 'Summer Rain' was released in 2007.

Satchidanandan is a National Fellow at the Institute of Advanced Study, Simla. He co-edits two on-line journals, Guftugu and 1 Over the 8th. His poems appeared in many prestigious poetry anthologies like Anthology of Contemporary Indian Poetry, The Dance of the Peacock.

He worked from 1996 to 2006, as the secretary of Sahitya Akademi. He returned to teaching after retiring from Sahitya Akademi, and worked as Director and Professor of the School of Translation Studies and Training at the Indira Gandhi National Open University in New Delhi until 2011.

Satchidanandan is married, and has two daughters.

== Awards and honours ==
=== Academic awards ===
- 1984: Kerala Sahitya Akademi C.B. Kumar Award for Prose for Kavitayum Janatayum
- 1989: Kerala Sahitya Akademi Award for Poetry for Ivanekkoodi
- 1999: Kerala Sahitya Akademi Award for Drama -for Gandhi
- 2000: Kerala Sahitya Akademi Award for Travelogue for Pala Lokam Pala Kaalam
- 2009: Kerala Sahitya Akademi Award for Translation for Padinjaran Kavithakal
- 2010: Kerala Sahitya Akademi Fellowship
- 2012: Sahitya Akademi Award for Marannu Vecha Vasthukkal

=== Other major awards and fellowships ===
- 1990: Srikant Verma Fellowship, Govt of Madhya Pradesh.
- 1993: Oman Cultural Centre Award, Oman.
- 1997: Mahakavi P. Kunjiraman Nair Award, Kerala.
- 1998: Bharatiya Bhasha Parishad Award, Kolkata
- 1999: Senior Research Fellowship, Govt of India
- 2001: Asan Smaraka Kavitha Puraskaram, Chennai.
- 2002: Baharain Keraleeya Samajam Award, Baharain
- 2002: Gangadhar Meher Award, Sambalpur, Orissa
- 2005: Pandlam Keralavarma Award, Kerala
- 2005: Bappu Reddy National Award, Andhra Pradesh.
- 2005: Vayalar Award, Kerala
- 2007: K. Kuttikrishnan Award, Kerala
- 2008: Subramanya Shenoi Award, Kerala
- 2009: Kadammanitta Ramakrishnan Award, Kuwait
- 2009: N T Rama Rao National Award, Andhra Pradesh
- 2009: Birla Fellowship for Comparative Literature, Delhi
- 2009: Padmaprabha Award, Kerala
- 2010: C P Menon Award, Kerala
- 2012: Kusumagraj National Award, Maharashtra
- 2012: Samastha Kerala Sahitya Parishad Award
- 2013: Kamala Surayya Award, Dubai
- 2014: Kuvempu National Award, Karnataka
- 2014: Manapuram V C Patmanabhan Award, Kerala
- 2014: Kala Award for Lifetime Achievement in Literature, London
- 2014: Muttathu Varkey Award
- 2014: SBT Suvarna Mudra Award
- 2015: National Fellowship, IIAS, Shimla
- 2016: UAE International Award for Poets of Peace, Dubai, Government of UAE
- 2016: V. Aravindakshan Memorial Award for Total Contribution
- 2016: Kanhangad Kavyavedi Award for Poetry
- 2017: Kamala Surayya Award for Total Contribution
- 2017: Vengayil Kunhirman Nayanar Kesari Award for Total Contribution
- 2017: P. Govinda Pillai Award for Total Contribution to Society and Literature
- 2017. U R Ananthamurhy Awards for Total Literary Contribution
- 2017: Ezhuthachan Puraskaram
- 2018: E K Divakaran Potti Memorial Award for Literary Translation
- 2018: ChiranatanaKalasamiti Award, Dubai, UAE
- 2019: Sahityolsav Award (Sunni Students Federation), Kerala
- 2019: Kavisamrat Upendra Bhanja National Award for poetry, Orissa
- 2019: Navamalayali Cultural Award, Kerala
- 2019: Kaliayachhan Poetry Award, Kerala
- 2019: Tata Literature Festival Poet Laureate Award, Bombay
- 2020: Mathrubhumi Literary Award
- 2021: ONV Award instituted by the University of Kerala
- 2023: Mahakavi Kanhaiyalal Sethia Poetry Award, Jaipur
- 2026: Vishambhara C Narayana Reddy National Award, Hyderabad

== Works in Malayalam ==
=== Poetry ===
- Anchu Sooryan (Five Suns, 1971)
- Aathmagita (The Song of the Self, 1974)
- Kavita (Poetry, 1977, 82, 84)
- Indian Sketchukal (Indian Sketches, 1978)
- Ezhuthachan Ezhutumbol (When the Poet Writes, 1979, 85, 87, 89)
- Peedana Kalam (Times of Torment, 1981, 89)
- Venal Mazha (The Summer Rain, 1982)
- Randu Deergha Kavyangal (Two Long Poems, 1983)
- Satchidanandante Kavithakal 1962–82 (Poems 1962–82, 1983,87)
- Socrateesum Kozhiyum (Socrates and the Cock, 1984)
- Ivanekkoodi (Him, too, 1987, 89, 90, 95, 97)
- Veedumattam (Changing House, 1988)
- Kayattam (The Ascent, 1990)
- Kavibuddhan (The Poet as Buddha, 1992)
- Enta Satchidanandan Kavitakal, Ed. Balachandran Chullikkad (Selected poems 1993)
- Desatanam (Going Places, 1994, 1995)
- Malayalam (1996, 1998, 2003))
- Apoornam (Imperfect, 1998)
- Theranjedutha Kavitakal (Selected Poems, 1999)
- Sambhashanathinu Oru Sramam (An Attempt to Converse, 2000)
- Vikku, (Stammer, 2002)
- Sakshyangal (Witness, 2004)
- Ghazalukal, Geetangal (Ghazals and Geets, 2005)
- Satchidanandante Kavithakal (Poems 1965–2005, 2006)
- Anantam (Infinite, 2006)
- Onnaam Padham (The First Lesson, 2006)
- Ente Kavita (My Poems, 2008)
- Marannunacha Vasthukkal (Misplaced Objects, 2009)
- Bahuroopi (The Shape-shifter, 2011)
- Tathagatham(2013)
- Nilkkunna Manushyan (The Standing Man, 2015)
- Sachidanandante Kavithakal 1965–2015 (Poems, 2016)
- Samudrangalkku Matramalla (Not only the Oceans, 2017)
- "Pakshikal ente Pirake Varunnu"(Birds Come afrter Me, 2018)
- "Pashuvum Puliyum" (The Cow and the Tiger, Poems for Children, 2019)
- "Pakshikkavitakal" (Bird Poems, Poems for Children, 2019)
- "Dukham enna Veedu (The House called Sorrow, 2020)
- "Oru Cheriya Vasantam" (A Small Spring", 2020)

=== Plays ===
- Saktan Thampuran (One-act Plays, 1983)
- Gandhi (Full-length Play, 1995)

=== Prose ===
- Kurukshetram (Studies in Modern Poetry, 1970)
- Janatayum Kavitayum ((Poetry and the People, 1982, 84)
- Marxian Soundarya Sastram (Marxian Aesthetics, 1983, 90)
- Thiranjedutha Lekhanangal (Selected Essays, 1985)
- Pablo Neruda (A Lecture on Pablo Neruda, 1985, 1990, Revised, 2007))
- Samvadangal (Dialogues: on society, culture, politics, religion education, ecology and literature, 1986)
- Sameepananangal (Approaches, 1986)
- Samskarathinte Rashtreeyam (The Politics of Culture, 1989)
- Sambhashanangal (Conversations: a collection of Interviews given, 1989)
- Brechtinte Kala (The Art of Bertolt Brecht, 1989, Revised, 2007)
- Padavukal (Steps: Early articles, 1990)
- Kazhchakal, Kazhachappadukal (Sights and Visions: Travelogues, 1991)
- Anveshanangal (Enquiries, 1991)
- Veenduvicharangal (Rethinkings, 1992)
- Soundaryavum Adhikaravum (Beauty and Power: on Aesthetics and Politics, 1993)
- Muhurtangal (Moments, selected Essays on Malayalam Literature, 1996)
- Pala Lokam, Pala Kalam (Many Times, Many Worlds, Travel Writings, 1998)
- Kalayum Nishedhavum (Art and Dissent, 1999)
- Bharateeya Kavitayile Pratirodha Paramparyam (The Tradition of Dissent of Indian Poetry, 2002)
- Moonnu Yatra (Three Travels, Travelogues, 2004)
- Kizhakkum Padinjarum (East and West, Travelogues, 2005)
- Adithattukal (Foundations, Essays, 2006)
- Mukhamukham (Face to Face, Interviews, 2006)
- Darshanathinte Ritubhedangal (Seasons of Vision, Articles, 2010)
- Malayalakavitha Patanangal (Studies in Malayalam Poetry, 2009, 2011)
- Sahityavum Pratirodhavum (Literature and Resistance, Criticism, 2013)
- Anubhavam, Orma, Yatra ( Experience, Memory, Travel, Autobiographical Essays, 2013)
- Vithum Vrikshavum (The Seed and the Tree, Selected Essays on Literature, 2013)
- Varoo, Ee Theruvile Raktham Kaanoo (Come and See the Blood in the Streets, 2017)
- Kavithayude Lokangal (The Many Worlds of Poetry, Essays, and Columns on Poetry, 2018)
- "Atmagatangal" (Monologues, Talks, 2018)
- "Dakshinam" (Travelogue, 2018)
- "Thiranjedutha Lkehanangal" (Selected Essays, 2018)
- "Chinthayude Mananagal" (The Dimensions of Thought, 2018)
- "Oru Pratisamskaarathinu Vendi"(For a Counter-Culture, 2020)
- "Anantaram" (Shortstories, 2020)

== Poetry translations in other languages ==
- Andha Admi Jisne Soorya Khoja (Selected Poems, Hindi, Delhi, 1987)
- Selected Poems (Gujarati, Ahmedabad 1989)
- Irachasakshigal (Selected Poems, Tamil, Coimbatore, 1990)
- Summer Rain: Three Decades of Poetry (English, Delhi, 1995)
- Voh Jise Sab Yad Tha (Selected Poems, Hindi, Delhi, 1996)
- Nanna Mai Nagara (Selected Poems, Kannada, Bangalore, 1996)
- How To Go To The Tao Temple (New Poems, English, Delhi, 1998)
- Sachidanandan Kavitaikal (Selected Poems, Tamil, Madras, 1998)
- Sareeram Oru Nagaram (Selected Poems, Tamil, Madras, 1999)
- Apoorna Aura Anya Kavitayem (Poems, Hindi, Delhi, 2000)
- Imperfect and Other New Poems (Poems, English, Calicut, 2000)
- Sagar Teerer Kavita (Poems, Assamese, Guwahati, 2001)
- Matra Ata Sparsatei Barasun Diya Megh (Poems, Assamese Language, Compiled and translated by Utpal Datta, published by Publication Board, Assam, Guwahati, 2013
- Herai Jowa Bastubor aru ananya kabita (Poems, Assamese Language, translated by Utpal Datta, published by Sahitya akademi, 2019, translation of his akademi award-winning book Misplaced Objects and other poems.
- Sachidanandaner Kavita (Poems, Bengali, Calcutta, 2001)
- So Many Births (Poems, English, Delhi, 2001)
- Kavitai Meendum Varum (Poems, Tamil, Madras, 2002)
- Peele Pathe Da Supna (Poems, Punjabi, Delhi, 2002)
- Ghar O Anyanya Kabita (Poems, Odia, Cuttack, 2002)
- Tant De Vies: L'Incomplet et autres poemes (Poems, French, Paris, 2002)
- Haklahat (Poems, Hindi, Delhi, 2004)
- Ham Jazeeraun Mein Rahte Hein (Poems, Urdu, Hyderabad, 2004)
- Sareeram Oka Nagaram (Poems, Telugu, Hyderabad, 2004)
- I Riti Della Terra (Poems, Italian, Rome, 2004)
- Suruatem (Poems, Hindi, 2005)
- Stammer and Other Poems (Poems, English, 2005)
- Ich Glaube Nicht An Grenzen (Poems, German, 2006)
- Luknat (Poems, Urdu, 2008)
- How Did Mayakovsky Commit Suicide (Poems, Arabic, 2009)
- While I Write (Poems, English, 2011)
- Rogha Danta (Selected Poems, Irish, 2012)
- K Satchidanandanyanchi Kavita (Marathi, 2013)
- Misplaced Objects and Other Poems (English, 2014)
- While I Write (Poems, Chinese, 2015)
- The Missing Rib (Poems, English, 1965–2015, 2016)
- "Not Only the Oceans" (Poems, English,2018)
- "The Whispering Tree" (Love Poems, English, 2020)
- "The Duet" (Poems in Japanese, tr. Miki Starfield)
- "The Duet" (Poems in Spanish, with Miki Starfield)

== Prose translation in other languages ==
- Marxiya Azagiyar (Marxian Aesthetics, Tamil, 1986)
- Bharatiya Sahitya: Sthapanayem Aur Prasthavanayem (Indian Literature: Positions and Propositions, 2003)

== Original works in English ==
- Indian Literature: Positions and Propositions (Essays in Indian Literature, Delhi, 1999)
- Authors, Texts, Issues (Essays in Indian Literature, Delhi 2002)
- Indian Literature Paradigms and Perspectives (Essays in Indian Literature, Delhi, 2008)
- Readings, Indian Literature and Beyond (Essays in Indian Literature, Delhi, 2009)
- "Positions: Essays on Indian Literature" (Delhi, 2019)

== Translations into Malayalam ==
=== Poetry ===
- Thiranjedutha Kavithakal (Selected Poems of Kazi Nazrul Islam), Trichur, 1976
- Nerudayude Kavithakal (Selected Poems of Pablo Neruda, Trivandrum, 1976; Reissued with more poems from Calicut, 1985, 1987, 1998)
- Jail Diary (Ho Chi Minh's Prison Diary, Trivandrum, 1976, Kottayam 1982, Calicut, 1998)
- Brechtinte Nooru Kavithakal (100 poems of Bertolt Brecht, Calicut, 1985)
- Naleyude Kavitha (Poems by Alexander Blok, Vladimir Mayakovsky and Yevgeny Yevtushenko. Irinjalakuda, 1982)
- Karutha Kavitha (Black Poetry from Three Continents, Badagara, 1982, 2012)
- Latin American Kavithal (Poetry from Latin America, Guruvayur, 1982)
- Maoyude Kavithakal (Mao Zedong's Poems, Kottayam, 1984)
- Kavithaparyadanangal (Poetry from Across the World, Ernakulam, 1986)
- Pathu Naveena Kavikal (Ten Modern Poets: Cesar Vallejo, Federico García Lorca, Giuseppe Ungaretti, Eugenio Montale, Yehuda Amichai, Chairil Anwar, Zbigniew Herbert, Attila József, Nazim Hikmet, Lu Hsun – Payyannur, 1989, Reissued as Oliyum Palunkum with two more poets, Wisława Szymborska and Mahmoud Darwish, Trivandrum, 2009)
- Nooru Russian Kavithakal (100 Russian Poems, Calicut, 1989)
- Samakaleena Hindi Kavitha (Contemporary Hindi Poetry, Calicut, 1989)
- Magadha (Shrikant Verma's Long Hindi Poem, Magadh, Calicut, 1990)
- Muppathu Indian Kavayathrikal (30 Indian Women Poets, calicut, 1990)
- Vakkukalude Akasham (Sitakant Mahapatra's Oriya poems, Sabdara Akash, Delhi, 1999)
- Urangunnavarkkulla Kathukal (Modern Swedish Poetry, Kottayam, 2007)
- Padinjaran Kavitha (Collected Translations, Vol 1. European Poetry, Calicut, 2008)
- Kettiyitta Koladu (The Last Poems of Kamala Das from Closure, Kottayam, 2010)
- Maram (Translation of Safdar Hashmi's Tree, Poetry for children, Trivandrum, 2010)
- Moonnam Loka Kavitha (Collected Translations, Vol. 2. Third World Poetry, Calicut), 2012
- Indian Kavitha (Collected Poems, Vol.3. Indian Poetry, Calicut, 2014)
- Palaloka Kavitha (Collected Poems, Vol. 4. Poetry from Around the World, Calicut, 2014)
- "Nerudayude Pranayakavithakavithakal" (Pablo Neruda's Love poems, 2020)
- "Daivavumayulla Sambhashanangal" (Conversations with God, Kabir Poems, 2021)

=== Plays ===
- Lukkallassinte Vicharana (Bertolt Brecht's The Trial of Lucullus, in TWO BRECHT PLAYS, Trichur, 1978)
- Ezhu Laghunadakangal (Seven Short Plays by W. B. Yeats, Bertolt Brecht and Ben Caldwell, Delhi, 2010)

== Works on K. Satchidanandan ==
=== In Malayalam ===
- Satchidanandante Lokangal: (The Worlds of Satchidanandan): Essays on the poet's works
- Navasargam M. Leelavathy (A Chapter on the Poet)
- Haritha Niroopanam Malayalathil – Ed. G. Madhusudanan (An eco-aesthetic study on the poem, Ezhimala)
- Bible Adhunika Kavithayil – Fr. Joseph Cheeran (A 100-page chapter on Bible and Satchidanandan's Poetry)
- Sambhashanangal Conversations with Satchidanandan
- Mukhamukham Collection of Interviews with Satchidanandan
- Grandhalokam a festschrift on Satchidanandan
- "Mathrubhumi" Weekly, a festschrift on Satchidanandan
- "Alilayum Nelkkatirum" (The Banyan Leaf and the Cornstalk), Studies on Sachidanandan's Poetry ed. P. Suresh

=== In English ===
- Malayalam Literary Survey: Kerala Sahitya Akademi, Trichur (Article 'Under the Bodhi Tree: A Study of the Images of Thathagatha in Satchidanandan's poems' by A. R. Vijayaraghavan
- Making it New: IIAS, Shimla 1995: E. V. Ramakrishnan (Chapter 'Living on the Faultline: The Poetry of Satchidanandan; with Interview)
- Indian Review of Books, Chennai, 8 Dec–Jan.1998–99. Review Article, 'Sensitive Reflections' by Pramod Menon
- The Book Review, Delhi, April 2001, Review Article, 'The Dialectic of Poetry' by E. V. Ramakrishnan
- World Literature Today, Minnesota, Spring 2002, Review Article, 'So Many Births' by John Oliver Perry
- Deccan Herald, Bangalore, 4 Oct 2003, Article 'Reminiscences of a Poet' by Lakshmee Rajeev
- GBD's of Assam Letters, Guwahati, 2004, Article 'Reflection's on Life' by Jaykanta Sharma
- How To Go To The Tao Temple, Delhi, 1998, 'Modernism and Beyond', Interview by Makarand Paranjape
- The Gulf Today, Dubai, 24 May 2001, 'Packaging Exotic Life', Article by Rajeev Poduval
- The Creative Mind, Delhi, July–Sept. 2004, 'Master Magician in Literature', Interview and article by Sujata Chowdhuri
- About Poetry, About Life, Author's essay on his life and work in While I Write (Harper-Collins, Delhi, 2011)
- A Conversation with Satchidanandan (Interview with Rizio Raj) in Misplaced Objects and Other Poems (Sahitya Akademi, Delhi, 2014)

=== In German ===
- Literatur Nachrichten, Frankfurt, February 2006 'Auch nach Tagore line Mange intelligentes Schariben', Interview
- Ich Glaube Nicht An Grenzen, Frankfurt, 2006, Introduction, Interview

=== In French ===
- Visions et révisions (Introduction); Genèse; L'homme qui se souvenait de tout; in Digraphe no. 80/81, 1997
- Les survivants; in Europe vol. 80, no. 883–884, 2002
- Tant de vies: L'incomplet et autres poèmes, Editions Caractères, Paris, 2002, introd. et trad. Martine Chemana
- Ragmala – Anthologie, Anne Cestaing (ed.) L'Asiathèque – Langues & Mondes, Paris, 2005: Introd. article and Extract

=== In Italian ===
- India, Rome, 2002, 2 Article, 'Poesia di Satchidanandan' by Antonio Menniti Ippolito
- I Riti Della Terra, Castelvecchi, Rome, Feb. 2005, Introduction 'Tradurre Versi' by Giulia Gatti
