= Aarachaar =

Malayalam Novel

- First edition
- Author: K. R. Meera
- Translator: J. Devika (English)
- Language: Malayalam
- Genre: Novel
- Publisher: DC Books (Malayalam), Hamish Hamilton (English)
- Publication date: December 2012
- Publication place: India
- Pages: 552
- Awards: Sahitya Akademi Award, Kerala Sahitya Akademi Award, Odakkuzhal Award, Vayalar Award
- ISBN: 9788126439362

Aarachaar (Ārāccāṟ lit. 'Executioner'; transl. Hangwoman: Everyone Loves a Good Hanging) is a Malayalam novel written by K. R. Meera. Originally serialised in Madhyamam Weekly in continuous 53 volumes, the novel was published as a book by DC Books in 2012. It was translated by J. Devika into English under the title Hangwoman: Everyone Loves a Good Hanging (Hamish Hamilton, 2014).

Set in Bengal, it tells the story of a family of executioners with a long lineage, beginning in the fourth century BC. The novel's protagonist, Chetna, is a strong, tenacious woman who struggles to inherit this profession.

According to noted literary critic M. Leelavathy, Aarachaar is one of the best literary works produced in Malayalam and follows the legacy of O. V. Vijayan's classic work Khasakkinte Itihasam. The novel received the 2013 Kerala Sahitya Akademi Award. It was also awarded the Odakkuzhal Award in 2013, Vayalar Award in 2014, Sahitya Akademi Award in 2015, and Muttathu Varkey Award in 2018. It was also shortlisted for the 2016 DSC Prize for South Asian Literature.

== Background ==
The inspiration for the novel came from a documentary One Day from a Hangman’s Life by Joshy Joseph.

== Plot ==
The story is narrated from the perspective of Chetna Grddha Mullick, daughter of hangman Phanibhushan Grddha Mullick, whose family lives near Nimtala Ghat in Chitpur, Kolkata. Chetna lives with her father, mother, brother (Ramu da), grandmother (Thakuma), father's brother (whom she calls Kaku) and his wife (Kakima). She is twenty-two years old and has been an intelligent student, scoring distinctions in her plus two. However, due to financial constraints, she does not study further. Her mother and Kakima sell tea to make ends meet at home. They live in poverty since the number of executions has only been decreasing in the last few decades. Meanwhile, Phanibhushan remains in significant media scrutiny because of his job, but he is very particular about not having Chetna's photograph in the public eye. This is because of what happened to his son, Ramu da, Chetna's older brother. Phanibhushan had been the hangman at the execution of Amartya Ghosh, who had murdered a Kolkata industrialist, Chandresen Ghosh and his three children. Amartya Ghosh's parents came to Phanibhushan, begging to somehow prevent their son's execution. However, Phani is adamant that he cannot let his judgment get in the way of his profession and refuses to listen to them. Two days after Amartya's execution, his father follows Ramu da, Phani's son, back from college and hacks off his limbs. This leaves Phani's only son disabled and depressed. Phani, therefore, is keen that his daughter Chetna get a government job after his retirement, since he has no one else who can take care of the family once he is gone. Phani takes great pride in his profession and the lineage of his family, which has for a long time been in this profession.

In late May, the family awaits the result of the mercy petition for Jatindranath Banerjee's execution, so that they would know if Phanibhushan has to be the hangman for his execution or not. Sanjeev Kumar Mitra, a news reporter for CNC, covers the story about Jatindranath's execution. For this reason, he visits Phanibhushan. Chetna is attracted to him due to his charismatic appearance and charming speech. However, he verbally abuses her in private. Mitra helps Phanibhushan to try to convince government officials to give the job of the executioner to Chetna, thereby making her the first hangwoman in the country. Later, he asks Phanibhushan for her hand in marriage, and he readily agrees because Mitra is an intelligent journalist whom Phani respects.

== Awards ==
- Kerala Sahitya Akademi Award (2013)
- Odakkuzhal Award (2013)
- Vayalar Award (2014)
- Sahitya Akademi Award (2015)
- Muttathu Varkey Award (2018)
