= M. Thomas Mathew =

Indian writer

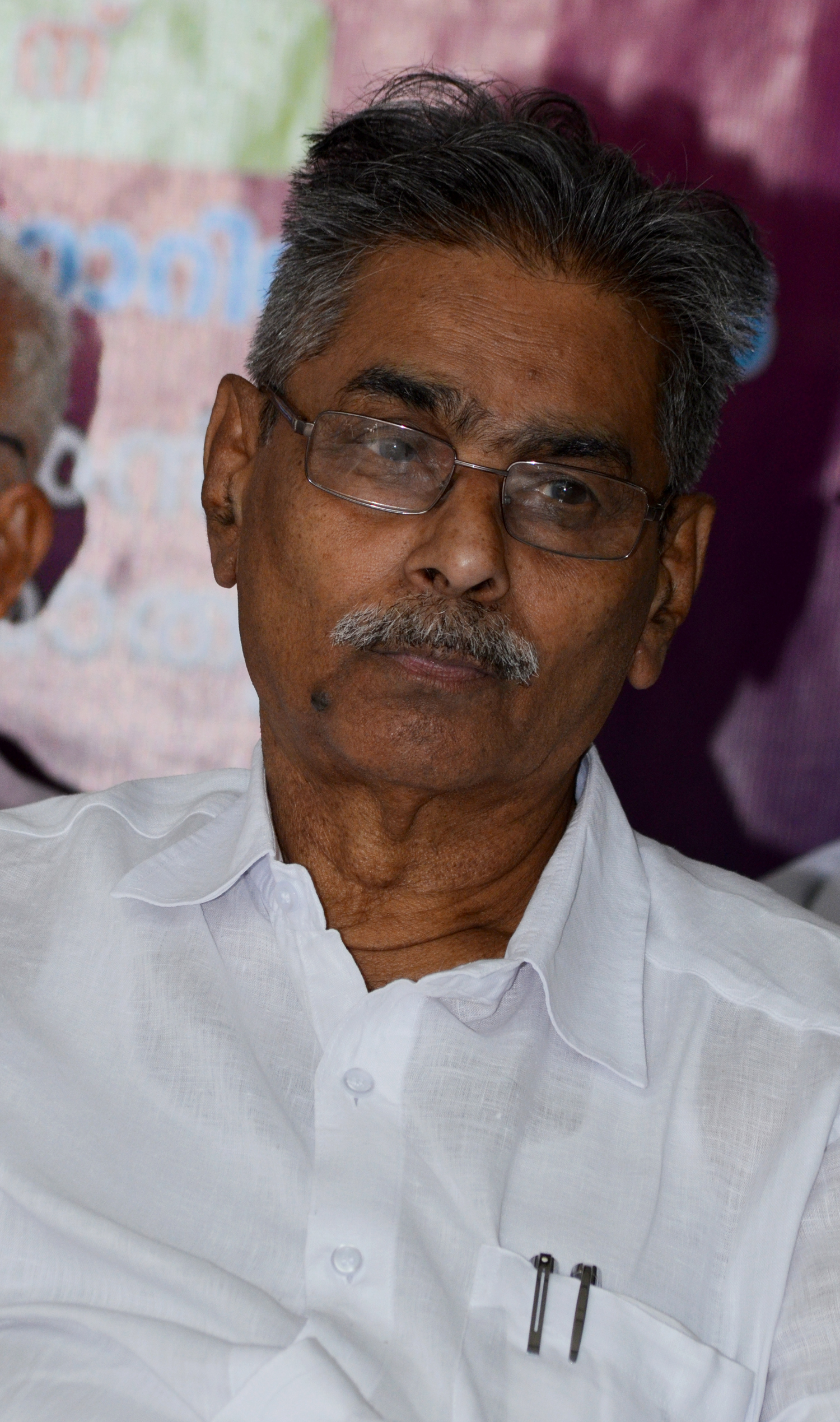
- Born: 27 September 1940 (age 85); Keekkozhur, Pathanamthitta, Kerala, India
- Occupations: Literary critic, Orator, Translator, Academic
- Writing career
- Notable works: Dhanthagopurathilekku Veendum; Ente Valmeekamevide; Sahithya Darshanam; Ashante Seethayanam; Athmavinte Murivukal; Marar - Lavanyanubhavathinte Yuktishilpam
- Notable awards: Sahitya Akademi Award; Vayalar Award; M. K. Sanu Award; Kerala Sahitya Akademi Award for Literary Criticism

M. Thomas Mathew is an Indian literary critic, orator, translator and academic who writes in Malayalam language. He has written a number of books on literary criticism such as Dhanthagopurathilekku Veendum, Ente Valmeekamevide, Ashante Seethayanam and Athmavinte Murivukal and has translated works into Malayalam which includes New Humanism written by M. N. Roy. He is a recipient of several honours including Sahitya Akademi Award, Vayalar Award and Kerala Sahitya Akademi Award for Literary Criticism.

== Biography ==
Born on 27 September 1940 in Keekozhur, a small hamlet in Pathanamthitta district, in the south Indian state of Kerala, Thomas Mathew did his education at Christian College, Chengannur and Maharaja's College, Ernakulam and started his career as a lecturer at his alma mater, Christian College, Chengannur. He has also worked as a professor in other educational institutions in Kerala such as Government College, Chittoor, Victoria College, Palakkad, and Maharaja's College, Ernakulam and as the principal in Panampilly Memorial Government College, Chalakkudy, Sree Neelakanta Government Sanskrit College, Pattambi, and Government College, Munnar before superannuating in 1996. He also served as the Director of Kerala Bhasha Institute.

Thomas Mathew has published a number of books, covering the genres of literary criticism, and translation and has edited three anthologies of literary articles. His work Athmavinte Murivukal fetched him the Kerala Sahitya Akademi Award for Literary Criticism in 2001. He was awarded Vayalar Award in 2009 for his work Marar: Lavanyanubhavathinte Yuktishilpam. A recipient of the M. K. Sanu Award in 2020, he received the Sahitya Akademi Award for his work Ashante Seethayanam in 2022. He is also a recipient of C. B. Kumar Endowmment Prize of Kerala Sahitya Akademi, C. J. Father Vadakkel Award, Dr. C. P. Menon Memorial Award, Mar Gregorios Memorial Award and Dr. T. P. Sukumar Memorial Award.

Thomas Mathew lives in Changampuzha Nagar, in Kochi, Kerala.

== Selected bibliography ==
=== Literary criticism and articles ===
| Title | Year | Form |
|---|---|---|
| Ente Valmeekamevide ? | 1983 | Articles |
| Sahithya Darsanam | 1986 | Literary criticism |
| Athmavinte Murivukal | 1998 | Literary criticism |
| Bible Anubhavam | 2007 | Articles |
| Rudithanusari Kavi | 2009 | Literary criticism |
| Marubhoomiyil Vilichu Parayunnavante Sabdam | 2011 | Literary criticism |
| Danthagopurathilekku Veendum | 2011 | Literary criticism |
| Manushyant̲e Sabdaṃ Sangeethaṃpole | 2011 | Articles |
| Anthasngharshathinte Varamozhi Sakshyam | 2018 | Literary criticism |
| Marar : lavanyaanubhavathinte Yukthi Shilpam | 2006 | Literary criticism |
| Anthasangharshathinte Varamozhi Sakshyam | 2018 | Literary criticism |
| Ashante Seethayanam | 2019 | Literary criticism |

=== Translations ===
| Title | Year | Form |
|---|---|---|
| R.U.R | 2014 | Translation |
| New Humanism | | Translation |

=== Edited books ===
| Title | Year | Form |
|---|---|---|
| Sargapatham - Akkitham | 2021 | Anthology |
| M. K. Sanu | 2021 | Anthology |
| Nataka Sameeksha | 2022 | Anthology |

== See also ==
- M. K. Sanu
- M. Achuthan
