= M. K. Menon =

Indian writer (1928–1993)

- Born: Moorkkanaat Krishnankutty Menon; 23 June 1928; Karumathra, Vadakkancherry, British India
- Died: 13 May 1993 (aged 64)
- Education: St. Thomas College, Thrissur; University of Madras
- Occupations: Novelist, Teacher & Translator
- Writing career
- Pen name: Vilasini
- Period: 1965–1993
- Genre: Novel
- Notable work: Avakasikal
- Notable awards: Kerala Sahitya Akademi Award; Kendra Sahitya Akademi Award; Vayalar Award; Odakkuzhal Award

Moorkkanaat Krishnankutty Menon (23 June 1928 – 13 May 1993), better known by his pen name Vilasini, was an Indian writer from Kerala who wrote in Malayalam-language. He is the author of India's longest novel, Avakasikal (The Inheritors), for which he won the Kendra Sahitya Akademi Award in 1981 and Vayalar Award in 1983. His first novel Niramulla Nizhalukal won the Kerala Sahitya Akademi Award in 1966.

== Biography ==
M. K. Menon was born in Karumathra, near Vadakkancherry, British India. He got his degree in Mathematics in 1947 from St. Thomas College, Trichur. In 1953 he left for Singapore where he started his life as the editor of the English monthly called Indian Movie News. Two years later, he became the sub-editor at the French News service Agence France-Presse (AFP) in Singapore. He was also a member of the Kerala Socialist Party. He came back to Kerala in 1977.

He made his debut as a novelist with the book Niramulla Nizhalukal (1965) which gives a vivid description of the lives of Malayalis in Singapore during the Second World War. He has a special liking for the stream-of-consciousness novel. As a novel that narrates the entire story through what passes in the minds of characters Oonjal is considered remarkable. Vilasini followed the examples of James Joyce and Virginia Woolf in his novels. His best known work is Avakasikal (The Inheritors). It runs 3958 pages, in four volumes, and is the longest novel in the Indian language.

Vilasini also translated many novels into Malayalam, including Pedro Páramo by Juan Rulfo and The Blind Owl (Boof-e koor) by Sadegh Hedayat.

== Published works ==
=== Novels ===
- Avakasikal (Inheritors)
- Oonjaal (Swing)
- Thudakkam (Beginning)
- Inaangaatta Kannikal
- Chundeli
- Yathramukham
- Niramulla Nizhalukal

=== Others ===
- Kaithiri (poems)
- Uthirmanikal (essays)
- Novalilekkoru Kilivaathil (essays)
- Prathyakshavalkaranam Novelil (essays)
- Swa-le (journalism)
- Sahashayanam (translation of Kawabata Yasunari's Japanese novel)
- Kurudan Moonga (translation of the Persian novel Boof-e koor (The Blind Owl) by Sadegh Hedayat)
- Pedroparamo (translation of the Spanish novel Pedro Páramo by Juan Rulfo)

== Achievements ==
- Kerala Sahitya Akademi Award (1966) for Niramulla Nizhalukal
- Kendra Sahitya Akademi Award (1981) for Avakaasikal
- Vayalar Award (1983) for Avakaasikal
