= Avakasikal =

1980 novel by M. K. Menon

- Author: Vilasini
- Language: Malayalam
- Genre: Novel
- Publisher: Sahithya Pravarthaka Co-operative Society, Poorna Publications
- Publication date: 1980
- Publication place: India
- Media type: Print
- Pages: 3958
- Awards: Kendra Sahitya Akademi Award

Avakasikal (The Inheritors) is a Malayalam-language novel by Vilasini (M. K. Menon) published in 1980. It runs into 3958 pages, in four volumes, and is the second longest novel written in any Indian language after Jeymohan's Tamil epic Venmurasu.

== Background ==
Avakasikal is Vilasini's fifth novel and was in the making for about 10 years. It was published by Sahithya Pravarthaka Co-operative Society, world's first writers' co-operative, in 1980 and was soon taken up by critics and readers as an exceptional work of art. It was soon named one of the finest works in Malayalam literature and is now considered as Vilasini's magnum opus. It won numerous awards including Sahitya Akademi Award and Vayalar Award. After remaining out-of-print for many years, Calicut-based Poorna Publications published the book in 2012.

== Plot summary ==
Set in Malaysia, the novel deals with Velunni Kurup, a septuagenarian self-made millionaire and a host to his greedy relatives who try to defraud him of his wealth. Krishnanunni, a leading lawyer and a close friend of Velunni Kurup is the protagonist of the novel. The novel depicts the minds of about ten persons belonging to four generations with great insight.

== Awards ==
- 1981: Sahitya Akademi Award
- 1981: Odakkuzhal Award
- 1983: Vayalar Award
