= Anand (writer) =

Indian writer (born 1936)

P. Sachidanandan
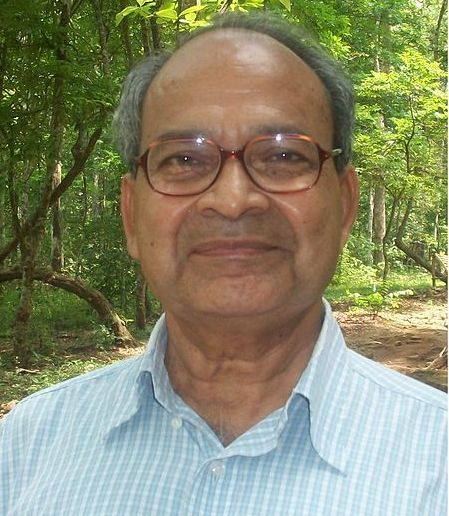
- Born: P. Sachidanandan; 1936 (age 89–90); Irinjalakkuda, Kerala, India
- Occupations: Writer, author
- Writing career
- Pen name: Anand
- Notable works: Aalkkoottam (1970); Marubhoomikal Undakunnathu (1989); Jaivamanushyan (1991); Govardhande Yathrakal (1995)
- Notable awards: 1981 Kerala Sahitya Akademi Award for Story; 1985 Kerala Sahitya Akademi Award for Novel; 1993 Vayalar Award; 1996 Odakkuzhal Award; 1994 Kerala Sahitya Akademi Award for Scholarly Literature; 1997 Sahitya Akademi Award; 2000 Muttathu Varkey Award; 2015 Vallathol Award; 2019 Ezhuthachan Puraskaram

P. Sachidanandan (born 1936), who uses the pseudonym Anand, is an Indian writer, writing primarily in Malayalam. His works are noted for their philosophical flavor, historical context and their humanism. He is a recipient of the Sahitya Akademi Award and three Kerala Sahitya Akademi Awards (story, novel, and scholarly literature). He is also a recipient of Ezhuthachan Puraskaram, Vayalar Award, Odakkuzhal Award, Muttathu Varkey Award, Vallathol Award and Yashpal Award. He did not accept the Yashpal Award and the Kerala Sahitya Akademi Award for Novel.

== Life ==
Sachidanandan was born in 1936 to a primary school teacher at Irinjalakuda in the Thrissur district (Trichur) of Kerala. He graduated in Civil Engineering from College of Engineering, Trivandrum in 1958. He retired as Planning Director of the Central Water Commission after a career which included extended stints working in Gujarat, Mumbai and Bengal. He also worked in the military (North-East Frontier Agency) for four years during 1966–70 in the Short Service Commission.

Anand resides in Delhi.

== Writing ==
It was the famous critic M. Govindan who helped Anand publish his maiden novel Alkkoottam. At age 34, it was his first ever published work. It was a new experience for the Malayalee readers and the book received rave reviews and pungent criticisms alike. He followed Alkkoottam (Crowd) with three more equally abstract novels: Maranacertificate (Death Certificate), Abhayarthikal (Refugees) and Utharayanam. These books made Anand a writer with considerable standing in Malayalam. But it was in the late eighties and early nineties that Anand came up with two more novels, Marubhoomikal Undakunnathu and Govardhanante Yaathrakal, which made him an icon in Malayalam literature.

Contemporary Malayalam writer M. Mukundan made the following comment about Anand's style.

Anand's is the most articulate voice in Kerala today, which questions the moral premises of politics and most importantly, resists Hindu fundamentalism. His essays and novels unmistakably establish a metaphor of resistance. The prose in Anand's novels is taut - no moon will ever rise in it, nor flowers blossom or river breezes waft through. His language, stripped to the bone, sometimes challenges the reader to go through it.

Anand has also written many short stories and articles, most of which deal with plight of the ordinary people who are exploited by the people in power. His characters are not necessarily a Malayali, and often weaves in historical elements into his stories. More often they are also located outside Kerala. He is also a essayist and occasionally writes poems also.

== Awards ==
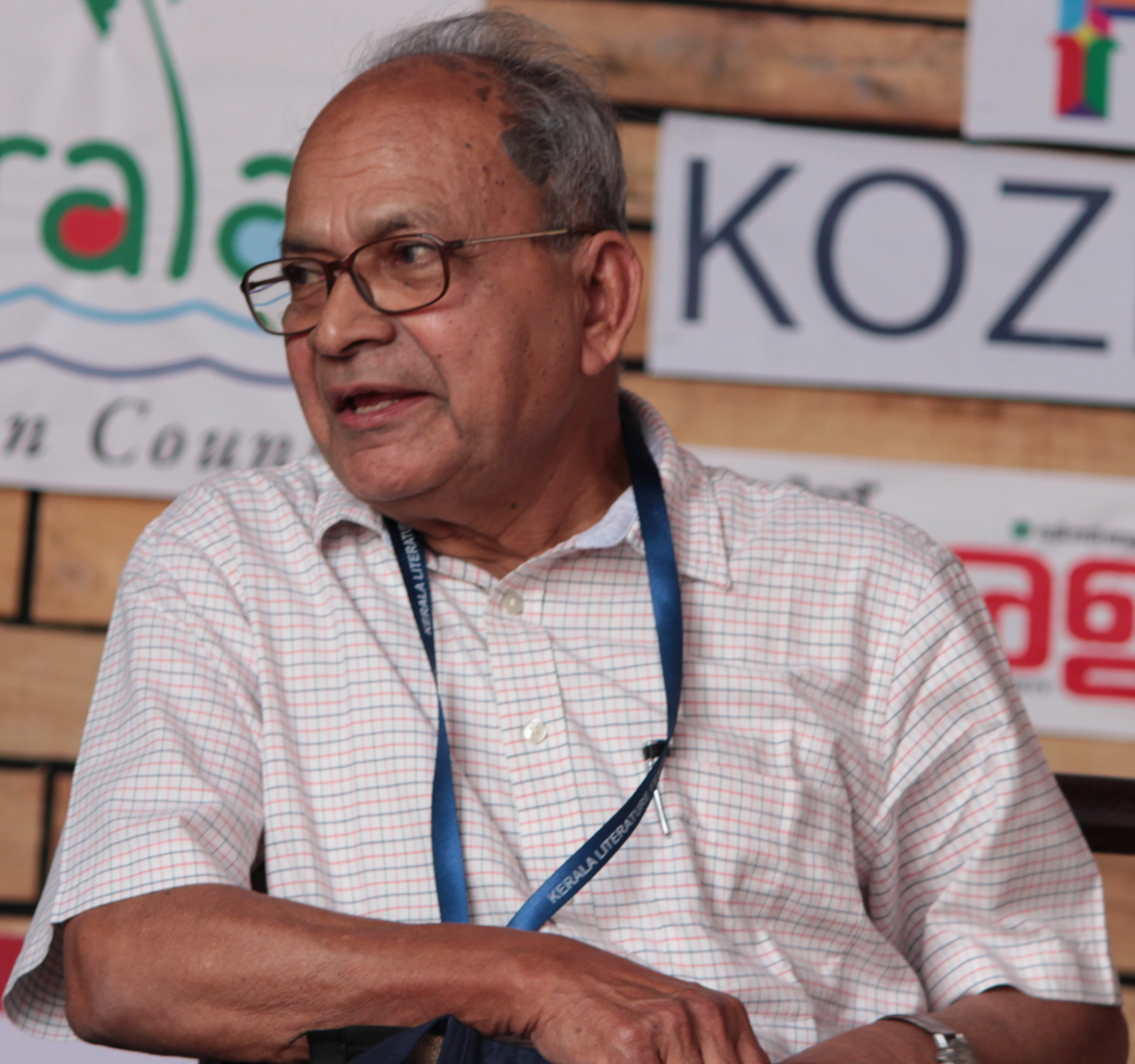
Anand in Kozhikode at 2017

- Kerala Sahitya Akademi Award for Story, 1981
- Kerala Sahitya Akademi Award for Novel, 1985
- Vayalar Award, 1993
- Kerala Sahitya Akademi Award for Scholarly Literature, 1994
- Odakkuzhal Award, 1996
- Sahitya Akademi Award, 1997
- Muttathu Varkey Award, 2000
- Sahitya Akademi Translation Prize, 2012
- Vallathol Award, 2015
- Ezhuthachan Puraskaram, 2019

== Criticisms ==
The 'abstractness' of Anand's writing has been a cause for criticism, from people alleging he does not actually name concrete people and organizations, instead relying on a historical and abstract narrative, even in his political essays. Balachandran Chullikkadu, a well-known poet in Malayalam, once said that Anand is the messiah of NGOs.

== Books by Anand ==
=== Novels and novellas ===
- Marana Certificate (Death Certificate ) Current Books. 1974. ISBN 9788122612189.
- Marubhoomikal Undakunnathu (The Deserts come into existence). Kottayam, Kerala State, India: DC Books. 1989. ISBN 9788171302017. OCLC 898852623.
- Govardhante Yathrakal (Govardhanan's Travels). DC Books. 1995. ASIN 8171305482. Received 1997 Sahitya Akademi Award
- Vyaasanum Vighneswaranum. Kottayam: DC Books. 1996. ISBN 8171305482. OCLC 37769967.
- Aalkkoottam (The Crowd) (1st DCB ed.). Kōṭṭayaṃ: DC Books. 1998. ISBN 8171304397.
- Utharayanam (in Malayalam). DC Books.
- Abhayarthikal (The Refugees). Kōṭṭayaṃ: DC Books. 2001. ISBN 817130141X. OCLC 53328951.
- Apaharikkapetta Daivangal. Kottayam: DC Books. 2001. ISBN 812640390X. OCLC 50913230.
- Samharathinte Pusthakam (The Book of Destruction). [Kottayam]: DC Books. 2005. ISBN 8126409967. OCLC 61261101.
- Vibhajanangal. [Kottayam]: DC Books. 2006. ISBN 8126411856. OCLC 70200274.
- Parinamathinte Bhoothangal (The Ghosts of Evolution). DC Books. 2007. ISBN 9788126417070.
- Dweepukalum Theerangalum (Islands and Shores). Kottayam: DC Books. 2010. ISBN 9788126427000. OCLC 660089123.
- Anandinte Novellakal. Kottayam, Kerala State, India: DC Books. 2014. ISBN 9788126451005. OCLC 907750487.

=== Short story collection ===
- Kathakal 2002-2012. DC Books. p. 213. ISBN 9788126478040.
- Asantham. DC Books. 2005. ASIN B007E4WX1Y.
- Veedum Thadavum (Home and Prison). SPCS. 1980.
- Odiyunna Kurisu (The Breaking Cross). SPCS. 1982.
- Samvādaṃ (kathakaḷ). Kōṭṭayaṃ: Sāhityapr̲avarttaka Sahakaraṇasaṅghaṃ : Nāṣanal Bukkst̲āḷ. 1987. OCLC 19326154.
- Nalamathe Aani (The Fourth Nail). Kottayam: DC Books. 1999. ISBN 8171309410. OCLC 42737283.
- Ente Priyappetta Kathakal. DC Books. p. 131. ISBN 9788126479702. Archived from the original on 25 January 2019.
- Irippu Nilppu Ezhunnelppu. DC Books. 2018. ISBN 9788126477517. Archived from the original on 25 January 2019.
- Vruthanthangalum Kathakalum. DC Books. p. 230. ISBN 978-81-264-6960-4. Archived from the original on 25 January 2019.
- Charithr̲akāṇḍaṃ. Kottayam: DC Books. 2003. ISBN 9788126406418. OCLC 55680321.

=== Dramas ===
- Savaghoshyathra
- Mukthipadham

=== Other books ===
- Jaiva Manushyan (The Biological Man). Kottayam, Kerala State, India: DC Books. 2006. ISBN 8171302173. OCLC 888466925.
- Prakriti, Paristhithi, Daaridryam, Jalam, Oorjam. [Kottayam]: DC Books. 2007. ISBN 978-8126415359. OCLC 180690158.
- Kannadi Lokam (Essays and Criticism) (in Malayalam). Current Books. p. 320. ISBN 9788122611694. Archived from the original on 25 January 2019.
- Nashta Pradesangal (in Malayalam). Current Books. 2014. p. 150. ISBN 9788122611687.
- Sthanam Thettiya Vasthu. Kozhikode, Keralam, India: Mathrubhumi Books. 2014. ISBN 9788182659070. OCLC 966971787.
- Ezhuthu Pusthakam Muthal Yudhamvare. Kottayam: DC Books. 2009. ISBN 9788126424276. OCLC 445486784.
- Vitavukal Enna Krishibhoomi. DC Books. p. 234. ISBN 978-81-264-3705-4.
- Sandarbhangal Sandehangal. DC Books. ISBN 9788126476893.
- Dweepukalum Theerangalum. DC Books. 2010. ISBN 978-81-264-2700-0. Archived from the original on 25 January 2019.

=== Poems ===
- Thadhagatham (in Malayalam). Mathrubhumi Books. 2013. p. 96.

=== Translations in English ===
- The death certificate. London: Sangam. 1992. p. 103. ISBN 0863113168. OCLC 28336910.
- Desert shadows. New Delhi: Penguin Books. 1998. ISBN 0140278249. OCLC 40331710.
- Twilight encounters: the fourth nail and other stories. New Delhi: Rupa & Co. 2002.
- Govardhan's travels : a novel. New Delhi: Penguin Books. 2006. ISBN 0143101331. OCLC 124032056.
- The book of destruction. New Delhi: Penguin India. 2012. p. 248. ISBN 9780143068464. OCLC 818535996.
- Twilight encounters : the fourth nail and other stories. New Delhi: Rupa & Co. 2002. ISBN 8171676561. OCLC 50424829.

== See also ==
- Malayalam literature
- List of Malayalam-language authors
