= E. V. Ramakrishnan =

Indian poet and literary critic

- Born: 23 March 1951 (age 75); Payyannur, Kannur district
- Occupations: Poet, literary critic
- Awards: Sahitya Akademi Award; Kerala Sahitya Akademi Award for Literary Criticism; Odakkuzhal award

E. V. Ramakrishnan is an English-Malayalam bilingual writer, poet and literary critic from Kerala, India. He received several awards, including the Kerala Sahitya Akademi Award for Literary Criticism and the Odakkuzhal Award. In 2023 Ramakrishnan received the Sahitya Akademi Award for his literary study Malayala Novelinte Deshakalangal.

== Biography ==
Born on 23 March 1951, at Vilayancode near Payyannur in Kannur district. After educated at Payyannur College, Government Brennen College and Devagiri College, he obtained his PhD from Marathwada University, Aurangabad (Maharashtra). He worked as lecturer in English at Jalna, Maharashtra in 1973-84 and then lecturer in the Department of English at South Gujarat University, Surat from 1985. He is now working as emeritus professor in Central University of Gujarat.

The book Indian short stories : (1900-2000), edited by him and published by Sahitya Akademi has been translated to Tamil with title Indiya Chirukathaigal.

== Works ==
=== Poetry collections ===
- Terms of seeing : new and selected poems. Delhi: Konark Publishers. 2006. ISBN 81-220-0711-2.
- A python in a snake park. New Delhi: Rupa & Co. 1994. ISBN 81-7167-194-2.
- Being Elsewhere in Myself (1980)
- Tips for Living in an Expanding Universe

=== Literary criticism ===
- The tree of tongues : an anthology of modern Indian poetry. Shimla: Indian Institute of Advanced Study. 1999. ISBN 81-85952-70-1.
- Crisis and confession : studies in the poetry of Theodore Roethke, Robert Lowell, and Sylvia Plath. Delhi: Chanakya Publications. 1988. ISBN 81-7001-034-9.
- Making it new : modernism in Malayalam, Marathi, and Hindi poetry. Shimla: Indian Institute of Advanced Studies. 1995. ISBN 81-85952-26-4.
- Mikhail Bakhtin: A Critical Introduction. ORIENT BLACKSWAN PVT. LTD. 15 February 2023. ISBN 978-9354421563.
- Indigenous imaginaries : literature, region, modernity. Hyderabad, Telangana, India: The Orient Blackswan. 2017. ISBN 978-9386689450.
- Locating Indian literature : texts, traditions, translations. New Delhi: The Orient Blackswan. 2017. ISBN 978-9386392404.
- Narrating India : the novel in search of the nation. New Delhi: Sahitya Akademi. 2005. ISBN 8126020725.
- From myth to history : the trajectory of modernism in the poetry of Malayalam, Marathi, Gujarati, and Hindi from the 1950s to the 1970s. Surat: Centre for Social Studies. 1991.
- Literary Criticism in India: Texts, Trends and Trajectories, published by the Sahitya Akademi.
- Aksharavum Adhunikathayum. Kerala Sahitya Akademi. 1992. ISBN 9780000129451.
- Malayala Novelinte Desa Kalangal (in Malayalam)
- Viyojippinte vangmayangal, DC Books, 2021 (in Malayalam)
- We speak in changing languages : Indian women poets 1990-2007. New Delhi: Sahitya Akademi. 2009. ISBN 978-8126026739. (with Anju Makhija)
- Bakhtinian explorations of Indian culture : pluralism, dogma and dialogue through history. Singapore: Springer. 2018. ISBN 978-9811063121. (with Lakshmi Bandlamudi)

=== As editor ===
- Ramakrishnan, E. V. (2013). Interdisciplinary Alter-natives in Comparative Literature. New Delhi: SAGE Publications. ISBN 978-8132111009.
- Culture, history, and politics : South Asian narratives. Jaipur: RAWAT PUBLICATIONS. 2019. ISBN 978-8131610619.

== Awards and honours ==
- Sahitya Akademi Award 2023 for his work Malayala Novelinte Deshakalangal.
- Kerala Sahitya Akademi Award for Literary Criticism for the work Aksharavum Adhunikathayum (1995)
- Odakkuzhal Award for his work Malayala Novelinte Desa Kalangal (2018)
- Dr. T. Bhaskaran Memorial Vaikhari Award for his work Malayala Novelinte Desa Kalangal
- Prof. CVN Literary Award for the work Malayala Novelinte Desa Kalangal (2022)
- U.G.C Career Award for young scholars (1987)
- Fellowship from Indian Institute of Advanced Study (1993)
- Fellowship from K. K. Birla Foundation (1999)
- Fulbright Fellowship (2001)
- Government of Canada Fellowship (2012)
