= T. Padmanabhan =

Indian writer (born 1931)

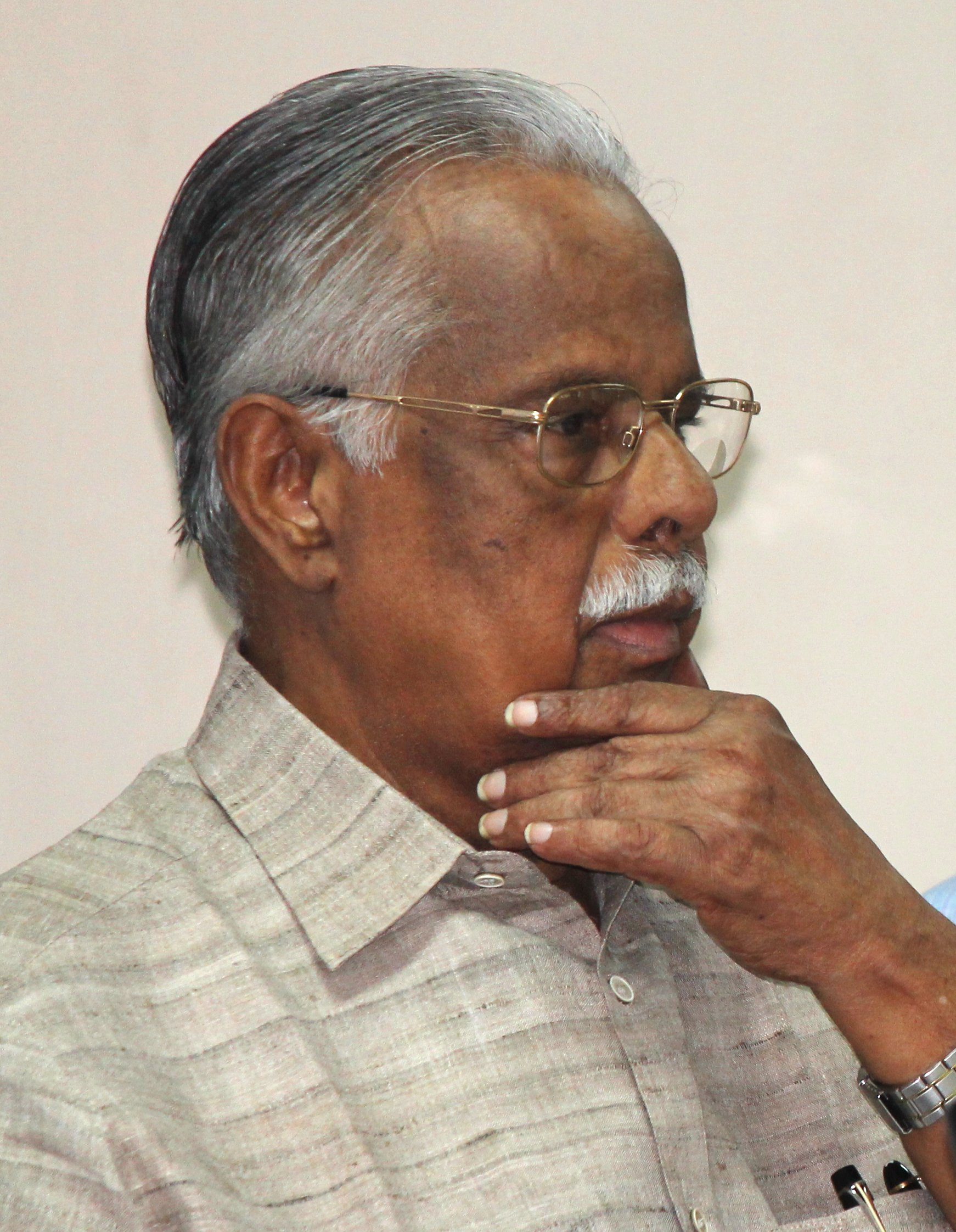
- Padmanabhan in 2013
- Born: 5 February 1928 (age 98); Pallikunnu, Malabar District, Madras Presidency, British India (present day Kannur, Kerala, India)
- Occupation: Short story writer
- Spouse: Kallanmarthodi Bharghavi
- Writing career
- Years active: 1950–present
- Notable works: Prakasam Parathunna Oru Penkutty, Gowri, Kadal, Thiranjedutha Kathakal
- Notable awards: 2022 ONV Literary Award; 2015 Mathrubhumi Sahitya Puraskaram; 2014 Bharatiya Bhasha Parishad Award; 2012 Kerala Sahitya Akademi Fellowship; 2007 Muttathu Varkey Award; 2003 Ezhuthachan Puraskaram; 2001 Vallathol Award; 2001 Vayalar Award; 1998 Lalithambika Andharjanam Award; 1996 Kendra Sahitya Akademi Award; 1995 Odakkuzhal Award; 1973 Kerala Sahitya Akademi Award; 2023 Kerala Jyothi

Thinakkal Padmanabhan (born 5 February 1928), popularly known as T. Padmanabhan, is an Indian author. A seminal figure in post Independence Indian literature, he is widely regarded as the greatest short story writer in Malayalam language. He is a recipient of several awards including the Ezhuthachan Puraskaram, the highest literary award of the Government of Kerala. He declined some of the earlier awards he was selected for which include Kerala Sahitya Akademi Award (1973), Odakkuzhal Award (1995) and Sahitya Akademi Award (1996). Mahatma Gandhi University conferred on him the honoris causa degree of the Doctor of Letters in 2018. In 2023, he was honoured with the Kerala Jyothi Award, the highest civilian award given by the Kerala Government.

== Biography ==
T. Padmanabhan was born on 5 February 1931 in a family of poor financial means at Pallikunnu near Kannur, in the south Indian state of Kerala to Puthiyidath Krishnan Nair and Devaki (Ammukutty) as the youngest of their four children. His father died when he was only a few months old and it was his mother and the eldest brother who looked after him during his childhood. He completed his school education from Chirakkal Raja's High School, and did his college studies at Mangalore Government Arts College, before graduating in law from Madras Law College (now known as Dr. Ambedkar Government Law College, Chennai) to start his practice in Thalassery and Kannur courts. By this time, he had already established himself as a budding writer and M. K. K. Nair, a known arts enthusiast and the then chairman and managing director of FACT, invited him to join the company. Padmanabhan served FACT in different capacities including that of the head of Materials Division to superannuate from service as its Deputy general manager in 1989 during which time he had a number of legal tussles with the company after M. K. K. Nair left FACT in 1971.

Padmanabhan was married to Kallanmarthodi Bharghavi who died in 2014 and the couple had no children. He lives a retired life in Kannur. His major works include Prakasham Parathunna Oru Penkutty, Oru Kathakrithu Kurishil, Makhan Singhinte Maranam, Veedu Nashtapetta Kutti, Kalabhariavan, Nalinakanthi, Sakshi, Sayvinte Naya, Gouri and Kadal.

== Legacy ==
What appeals most to his readers in all his early and recent stories is the lyrical quality of the language and the aesthetics of his perceptions, especially in the portrayal of loneliness and helplessness, writes K. Ayyappa Panicker, about T. Padmanabhan, in his book A Short History of Malayalam Literature.

Padmanabhan started writing at the age of 19 and has written over 190 short stories of which Prakasam Parathunna Oru Penkutty (The Girl Who Spreads Radiance, 1955), Oru Kathakrithu Kurishil (A Story Writer being Crucified, 1956), Makhan Singhinte Maranam (The Death of Makhan Singh, 1958), Kala Bhairavan, Gouri (1993) and Maraya (2017) are some of his major works. He has also written a book, Ente Katha, Ente Jeevitha (My Story, My Life) which is a compilation of some of his essays and articles, an interview and an afterword by Pinarayi Vijayan.

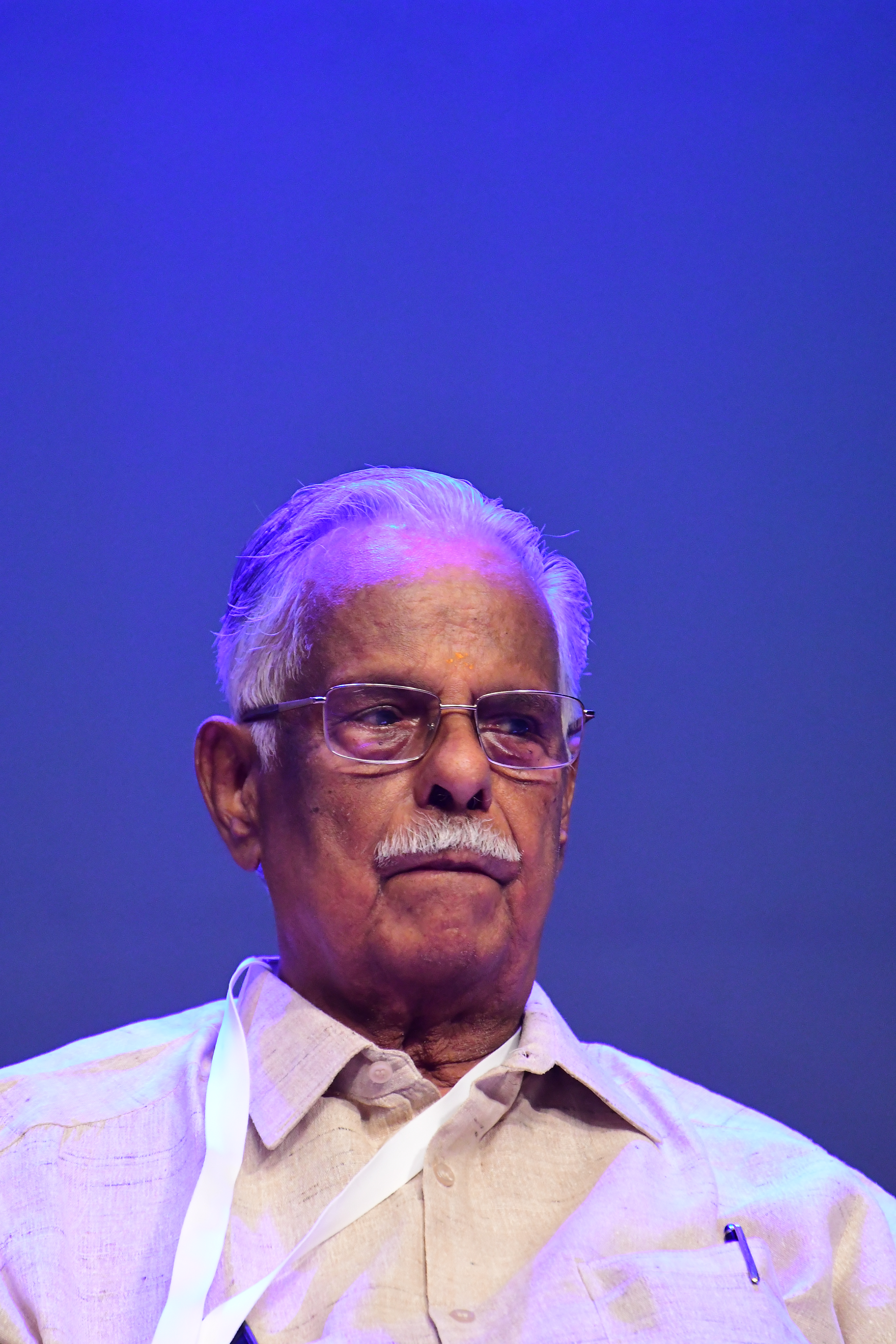
T. Padmanabhan in 2022

Padmanabhan, whose stories have been translated in almost every Indian languages and foreign languages such as Russian, French and English. has been credited with bringing the modern Malayalam short story nearer to the subjective intensity of the lyric. His stories are known to have emerged, portraying an individualistic idiom, when Malayalam literature was rife with repeated depiction of romantic idealism and social commitment.

His short story "Gauri" was adapted into a musical and was broadcast by Doordarshan in 1992; the story was also made into a film the same year by Kaviyoor Sivaprasad. Another of his stories, Gaadha, was taken up by the award-winning director/cinematographer, Shaji N. Karun, in 2016 but the film was never released.

== Awards and honours ==
Towards the early days of his career, Padmanabhan made it almost a habit of declining awards; when his story, Saakshi was chosen for the Kerala Sahitya Akademi Award for Story in 1973, he declined it. More than two decades later, the 1995 Odakkuzhal Award for his story, Kadal was also rejected followed by another rejection a year later, the Kendra Sahitya Akademi Award of 1966 for Gowry. He received the Lalithambika Andharjanam Award in 1998 and the Vayalar Award of 2001 for Puzha Kadannu Marangalude Edayileku. He received one more award in 2001, the Vallathol Award, The government of Kerala honoured him with their highest literary award, the Ezhuthachan Award in 2003 and he was selected for the Muttathu Varkey Award in 2007. The Kerala Sahitya Akademi inducted him as their distinguished fellow in 2012 and he received two awards in 2014, the C. V. Kunhuraman Literary Prize and the Bharatiya Bhasha Parishad Award. He was awarded the Mathrubhumi Sahitya Puraskaram in 2015, and the Abu Dhabi Sakthi-T. K. Ramakrishnan Award in 2019. Mahatma Gandhi University conferred him with an honorary doctorate in 2018.

== Bibliography ==
=== Short stories ===
- Padmanabhan, T. (1988). Nalinakanthi. Kottayam: DC Books. ISBN 9788171302338.
- Padmanabhan, T. (2010). Gulmohammed. Kottayam: D C Books. ISBN 9788126400379.
- Padmanabhan, T. (2008). Pallikunnu. Kottayam: D C Books.
- Padmanabhan, T. (2007). Ente Priyappetta Kathakal (5th ed.). Kottayam: D. C. Books. ISBN 9788126406005.
- Padmanabhan, T. (2002). Budha Darshanam. Kollam: Sankeerthanam publications.
- Padmanabhan, T. (1995). Padmanabhante Kathakal. Kottayam: D.C. Books. ISBN 9788126405275.
- Padmanabhan, T. (1986). Kaalabhairavan. Kottayam: D.C. Books.
- Padmanabhan, T. (1982). Sahrudayanaaya Oru Cheruppakkarante Jeevithaththil Ninnu. Kottayam: Sahitya Pravarthaka Sahakarana Sangam.
- Padmanabhan, T. (1971). T. Padmanabante Thiranjedutha Kathakal. Thrissur: Current Books.
- Padmanabhan T (1999). Ente Adyathe Kathakal (3rd ed.). Calicut: P.K. Brothers.
- Padmanabhan, T. (2016). Apoorvaragam (2nd ed.). Kozhikode: Mathrubhumi Books. ISBN 9788182668294.
- Padmanabhan, T. Katha Theerumpol Oru Vanampati Parakkunnu. Malabari. Archived from the original on 13 August 2022.
- Padmanabhan, T. Iruttum Mumpe. Archived from the original on 13 August 2022.
- Padmanabhan, T. (2014). Ningale Enikkariyam. Kottayam: D. C. Books. ISBN 9788126452392.
- Padmanabhan, T. (2012). Puzha Katannu Marangalude Idayilekku. Kottayam: D C Books.
- Padmanabhan, T. (2002). T. Padmanabhante Kathakal Sampoornam. Kottayam: DC books. ISBN 9788126405275.
- Padmanabhan, T. (2004). Ningale Enikkariyam. Kottayam: DC books. ISBN 9788126452392.
- Padmanabhan T (1999). Kalavarsham. Pappiyon, Kozhikode: Pappiyon, Kozhikode.
- Padmanabhan. T (1956). Oru Kadhakruthu Kurisil. P.K.Brothers: P.K.Brothers.
- Padmanabhan. T (1958). Makhasinginde Maranam. New Delhi Asian Educational services.
- Padmanabhan T (1999). Athu Christuvayirunnu. Mulbery, Calicut: Mulbery, Calicut.
- Padmanabhan T (1991). Gouri. D.C Books: D.C Books.
- Padmanabhan, T. (1955). Prakasham Parathunna Oru Penkutty. Kottayam: Sahitya Pravarthaka Co-operative Society.
- Padmanabhan, T. (1994). Kadal. Kottayam: D. C. Books.
- Padmanabhan, T. (2014). Padmanabhante Kuttikal (2nd ed.). Kannur: Alfane Publishers pvt.ltd. ISBN 9789382507352.
- Padmanabhan, T. (1973). Saakshi. Kottayam, SPCS.
- Padmanabhan, T. (1979). Harrison Saayvinte Naaya.
- Padmanabhan, T. (1983). Veedu Nashtapetta Oru Kutty.
- Padmanabhan, T. (2018). Maraya. DC Books. ISBN 9788126476954. Archived from the original on 13 April 2019.

=== Memoirs ===
- Padmanabhan, T. (2015). Ente Katha Ente Jeevitham. Kozhikode: Olive Books. ISBN 9789385269004.
- Padmanabhan, T. (2010). Kathakalkkidayil. Kottayam: D.C.Books. ISBN 9788126427376.

=== Translations ===
- Padmanabhan T. Fifteen stories. Translated by Prema Jayakumar. Tharjuma book point.

== See also ==
- List of Malayalam-language authors by category
- List of Malayalam-language authors
