= P. Surendran =

Indian writer (born 1961)

- പി. സുരേന്ദ്രൻ
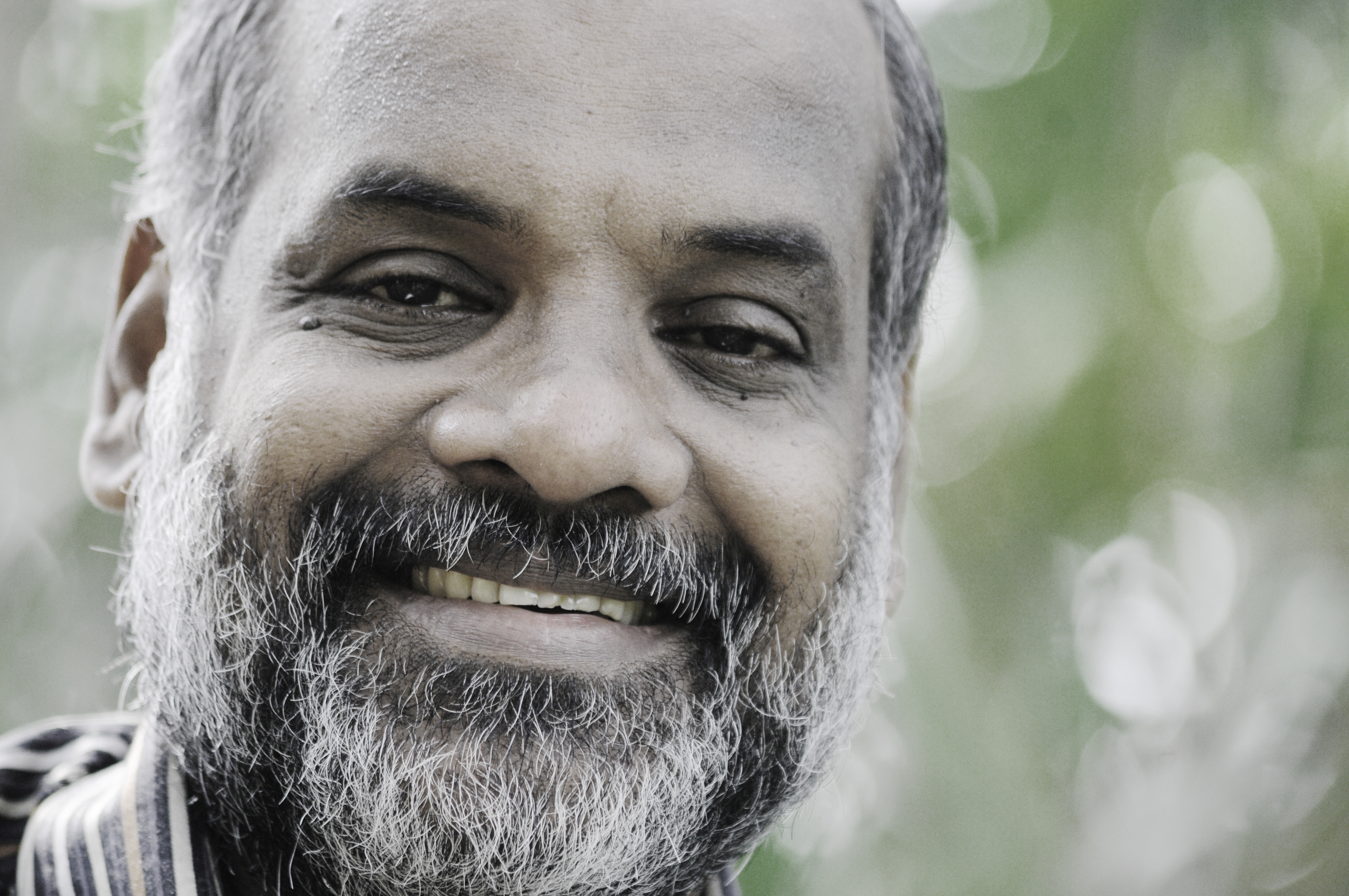
- Born: 4 November 1961 (age 65); Pappinippara, Manjeri, Kerala, India
- Occupations: Novelist, writer, columnist, art critic and philanthropist
- Spouse: Sujatha
- Children: 2
- Writing career
- Language: Malayalam
- Genres: Novel, short story
- Notable works: Gramapathakal; Jalasandhi
- Notable awards: Kerala Sahitya Akademi Award, Odakkuzhal Award, Kerala Lalitakala Akademi Award

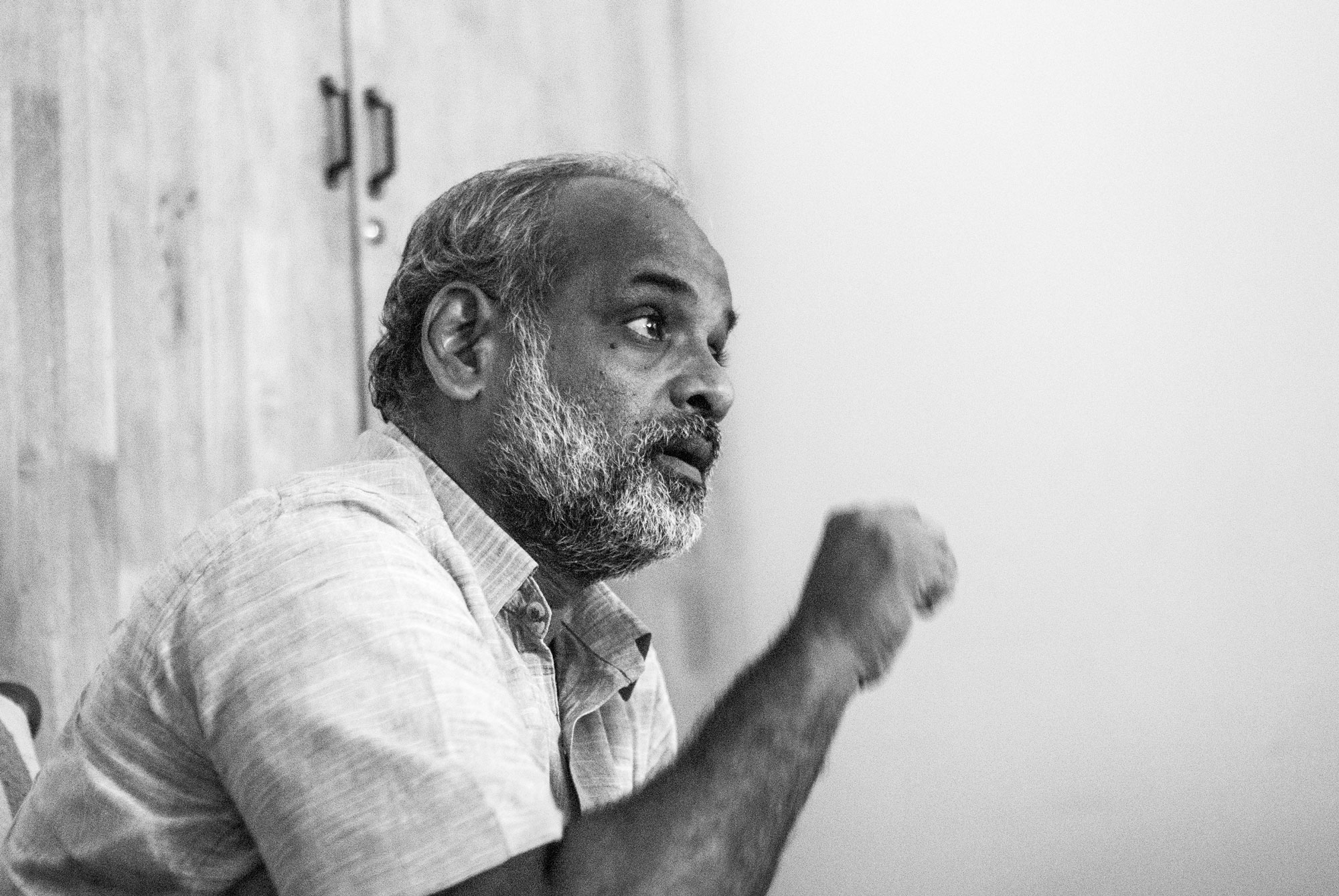
Author P Surendran, photographed in 2014.

P. Surendran (born 4 November 1961) is an Indian writer, columnist, art critic and a philanthropist. He has published over 30 books, including works of fiction, travelogues and general writings, in Malayalam and also a collection of short stories in English. He was a Malayalam teacher at Kumaranellur School, Palakkad district. He is a recipient of the Kerala Sahitya Akademi Award (2003, 2013).

== Early life ==
P. Surendran was born in Pappinippara, Manjeri, Kerala to Kumaran Nair and Sarojini Amma.His family later shifted to Vattamkulam near Edappal. He did his schooling from Edappal. He retired from GHSS Kumaranellur as a malayalam teacher.

== Literary life ==
An accomplished writer and art critic in Malayalam, Surendran has won many awards including the Kerala Sahitya Akademi Award, Abu Dhabhi Shakthi Award, Odakkuzhal Award and Padmarajan Award among others. His book on the famous artist A. Ramachandran won the Kerala Lalithakala Akademi's award for the best book on art criticism. His stories have been translated into English, Hindi and other Indian languages. Surendran came to the limelight of Kerala's literary circle after he won first prize in the short story competition conducted by Mathrubhumi Weekly in 1981. His first collection of stories, Piriyan Govani, was published in 1986. Surendran has published over 30 books, including fictions, travelogues and general writings, in Malayalam and also a collection of short stories in English. His latest novel, Greeshma Mapini, roughly based on the life of former Kerala chief minister V. S. Achuthanandan, is published by DC Books. His latest book on veteran artist Yusuf Arakkal, called Velichathinte Paryayangal, is published by DC Books and Gallerie Sara Arakkal.

== Works ==
=== Collections ===
- Abhayarthikalude Poonthottam (അഭയാർത്ഥികളുടെ പൂന്തോട്ടം)
- Bermuda (ബർമുഡ)
- Bhumiyude Nilavili (ഭൂമിയുടെ നിലവിളി)
- Che (ചെ)
- Chinese Market (ചൈനീസ് മാർക്കറ്റ്)
- Haritha Vidyalayam (ഹരിത വിദ്യാലയം)
- Jalasandhi (ജലസന്ധി)
- Karutha Prarthanakal (കറുത്ത പ്രാർത്ഥനകൾ)
- Piriyan Govani (പിരിയൻ ഗോവണി)
- Rashtriya Kathakal (രാഷ്ട്രീയ കഥകൾ)
- Thiranjedutha Kathakal (തിരഞ്ഞെടുത്ത കഥകൾ)

=== Autobiography ===
- Elanchipoomanamulla Nattuvayikal (ഇലഞിപ്പൂമണമൂള്ള നാട്ടുവഴികൾ)

=== Novels ===
- Greeshmamapini {ഗ്രീഷ്മമാപിനി}
- Kaveriyude Purushan {കാവേരിയുടെ പുരുഷൻ}
- Jaivam {ജൈവം}
- Mahayanam {മഹായാനം}
- Mayapuranam {മായാപുരാണം}
- Samoohyapatam {സാമൂഹ്യപാഠം}

=== Translations ===
- Synonyms for Sea, Translated by Elzy Taramangalam and published by Rupa & Co.

== Awards ==
He has published many award-winning books in Malayalam, including collections of short stories, novels, travel sketches and art criticism. He won the Kerala Lalitakala Akademi Award and Kerala Sahitya Akademi Award for Story for his collection of short stories, Jalasandhi. Gramapathakal won the Kerala Sahitya Akademi Award for Travelogue in 2013. He has also won many other awards including V. P. Sivakumar Award, SBT award, Abu Dhabi Sakti award, Odakkuzhal award, Padmarajan Award, etc.

== Personal life ==
P. Surendran is married to Sujatha. They have 2 sons. They live in Vattamkulam, Edappal.
