= Kerala Sahitya Akademi Award for Novel =

Annual Indian literary award

The Kerala Sahitya Akademi Award for Novel is an award given every year by the Kerala Sahitya Akademi (Kerala Literary Academy) to a Malayalam writer for writing a novel of literary merit. It is one of the 12 categories of the Kerala Sahitya Akademi Award.

== Awardees ==
| Year | Book | Author | Image |
|---|---|---|---|
| 1958 | Ummachu | Uroob (P. C. Kuttikrishnan) | |
| 1959 | Naalukettu | M. T. Vasudevan Nair | |
| 1960 | Oru Vazhiyum Kure Nizhalukalum | Rajalakshmi | |
| 1961 | Oru Theruvinte Katha | S. K. Pottekkatt | |
| 1962 | Maya | K. Surendran | |
| 1963 | Nizhalppadukal | C. Radhakrishnan | |
| 1964 | Athmavinte Novukal | Nandanar (P. C. Gopalan) | |
| 1965 | Enippadikal | Thakazhi Sivasankara Pillai | |
| 1966 | Niramulla Nizhalukal | Vilasini (M. K. Menon) | |
| 1967 | Verukal | Malayattoor Ramakrishnan | |
| 1968 | Ara Nazhika Neram | Parappurath (K. E. Mathai) | |
| 1969 | Balikkallu | Unnikrishnan Puthoor | |
| 1970 | Arohanam | V. K. N. | |
| 1971 | Thottangal | Kovilan (V. V. Ayyappan) | |
| 1972 | Nakshatrangale Kaaval | P. Padmarajan | |
| 1973 | Ee Lokam Athiloru Manushyan | M. Mukundan | |
| 1974 | Ini Njan Urangatte | P. K. Balakrishnan | |
| 1975 | Ashtapadi | Perumbadavam Sreedharan | |
| 1976 | Nizhalurangunna Vazhikal | P. Valsala | |
| 1977 | Agnisakshi | Lalithambika Antharjanam | |
| 1978 | Smarakasilakal | Punathil Kunjabdulla | |
| 1979 | Narmani Pudava | Sarah Thomas | |
| 1980 | Illam | George Onakkoor | |
| 1981 | Ennappaadam | N. P. Mohammed | |
| 1982 | Pandavapuram | Sethu (A. Sethumadhavan) | |
| 1983 | Mahaprasthanam | Madampu Kunjukuttan | |
| 1984 | Orotha | Kakkanadan (G. V. Kakkanadan) | |
| 1985 | Abhayarthikal | Anand (P. Sachidanandan) | |
| 1986 | Sruthi Bhangam | G. Vivekanandan | |
| 1987 | Nahusha Puranam | K. Radhakrishnan | |
| 1988 | Ore Deshakkaraya Njangal | Khalid | |
| 1989 | Prakriti Niyamam | C. R. Parameswaran | |
| 1990 | Gurusagaram | O. V. Vijayan | |
| 1991 | Parinamam | M. P. Narayana Pillai | |
| 1992 | Driksakshi | Unnikrishnan Thiruvazhiyode | |
| 1993 | Ohari | K. L. Mohana Varma | |
| 1994 | Mavelimannan | K. J. Baby | |
| 1995 | Sufi Paranja Katha | K. P. Ramanunni | |
| 1996 | Vridhasadanam | T. V. Kochubava | |
| 1997 | Janithakam | M. Sukumaran | |
| 1998 | Innalathe Mazha | N. Mohanan | |
| 1999 | Kocharethi | Narayan | |
| 2000 | Athmavinu Sariyennu Thonnunna Karyangal | C. V. Balakrishnan | |
| 2001 | Aalahayude Penmakkal | Sara Joseph | |
| 2002 | Aghorasivam | U. A. Khader | |
| 2003 | Vadakkuninnoru Kudumbavrithantham | Akbar Kakkattil | |
| 2004 | Lanthan Batheriyile Luthiniyakal | N. S. Madhavan | |
| 2005 | Kannadiyile Mazha | Jose Panachippuram | |
| 2006 | Kalapangalkkoru Grihapadam | Babu Bharadwaj | |
| 2007 | Pathira Vankara | K. Raghunathan | |
| 2008 | Chavoli | P. A. Uthaman | |
| 2009 | Aadujeevitham | Benyamin | |
| 2010 | Barsa | Khadija Mumtaz | |
| 2011 | Manushyanu Oru Aamukham | Subhash Chandran | |
| 2012 | Andhakaranazhi | E. Santhosh Kumar | |
| 2013 | Aarachaar | K. R. Meera | |
| 2014 | KTN Kottoor: Ezhuthum Jeevithavum | T. P. Rajeevan | |
| 2015 | Thakshankunnu Swaroopam | U. K. Kumaran | |
| 2016 | Sugandhi Enna Andal Devanayaki | T. D. Ramakrishnan | |
| 2017 | Nireeshwaran | V. J. James | |
| 2018 | Ushnarashi | K. V. Mohan Kumar | |
| 2019 | Meesha | S. Hareesh | |
| 2020 | Adiyala Pretham | P. F. Mathews | |
| 2021 | Kalyaniyennum Dakshayaniyennum Peraya Randu Sthreekalude Katha | R. Rajasree | |
| 2021 | Puttu | Vinoy Thomas | |
| 2022 | Sambarkkakranthi | V. Shinilal | |
| 2023 | Zin | Haritha Savithri | |
| 2024 | Aano | G. R. Indugopan | |
