= Aarohanam =

Aarohanam or Arohanam may refer to:

- Arohana, ascending scale of notes in Indian classical music
- Aarohanam (1980 film), an Indian Malayalam-language film
- Aarohanam (2012 film), an Indian Tamil-language film
- Arohanam (novel), a 1969 Malayalam-language novel by Indian writer V. K. N.

== See also ==
- Arohan (film), a 1982 Indian film
- Arohana Marthoma Church, Anicadu, Kerala, India
