= Maaya (1972 film) =

- Directed by: Ramu Kariat
- Written by: K.Surendran
- Produced by: T. E. Vasudevan for Jaya Maruthi
- Starring: Prem Nazir; Sharada; Sujatha; Vijayasree; Thikkurissy Sukumaran Nair; Sankaradi; K. P. Ummer
- Cinematography: Balu Mahendra
- Edited by: B. S. Mani
- Music by: V. Dakshinamoorthy
- Release date: 9 March 1972
- Country: India
- Language: Malayalam

Maaya is a 1972 Indian Malayalam-language film, directed by Ramu Kariat for Jaya Maruthi, starring Thikkurissy Sukumaran Nair in the lead role. Prem Nazir and Sharada also play pivotal roles, supported by Vijayasree, Sujatha, Sankaradi and T. R. Omana playing other important roles. The film was based on an award-winning 1963 novel with the same name by popular novelist K. Surendran.

== Plot ==
Decent Sankarappillai is a successful local businessman who runs a grocery shop in the village centre. Starting from a poor background, Sankarappillai worked hard to reach his position and values money more than anything else in life. He also owns the little textile shop of the village with his son Raghuvaran Pillai called Raghu. Sankarappillai's family also includes his second wife Eeswari and daughter Gomathy. Sankarappillai is separated from his first wife Kalyani, but visits and supports his daughter Omana in the first marriage.

Gomathy is in love with Madhavankutty an aspiring writer who is unemployed despite being educated. Sankarappillai and Eeswary also encourages their relation. Madhavankutty takes up a job in a newspaper in the town. Raghu wishes to expand the textile business, Madhavankutty introduces Raghu and Sankarappillai to his old classmate Vasukkutty. Vasukkutty's uncle Pankippillai run a bigger textile shop in the town. Though the two head-strong men clash at first, Pankippillai agrees to loan textiles worth Rs 30,000 to Sankarappillai. Vasukkutty meets Gomathy during a business visit to Sankarappillai's home and falls head over heels for the beautiful girl. Seeking a business advantage, Sankarappillai decides to arrange Gomathy's wedding with Vasukkutty, leaving a heartbroken Madhavankutty to writing. Gomathy, even though heart broken, settled to a happy married life with Vasukkutty.

Sankarappillai's calculations fail when Pankippillai refuses to honour the loan arrangement even after the wedding. In the meantime, a relation slowly develops between Madhavankutty and Omana. Raghu falls in love with Vasukkutty's sister Kamalam. Sankarappillai clashes with his wife as he plans to include his elder daughter Omana in his will. Gomathy and Vasukkutty visit Sankarapillai with proposal for an alliance between Raghu and Kamalam. Sankarappillai agrees with the condition of Rs 10,000 as dowry from Pankippillai. During the wedding arrangements, Sankarappillai visits Pankippillai and demands the dowry beforehand. This angers Pankippillai, who refuses to give the money. This cancels the wedding and angers Vasukkutty.

The rest of the story is Sankarappillai's fall, clashing with his own family.

== Cast ==
- Thikkurissy Sukumaran Nair as Sankarappillai
- Prem Nazir as Madhavankutty
- Sharada as Gomathy
- K. P. Ummer as Vasukkutty
- Adoor Bhasi as Raghuvaran Pillai a.k.a. Raghu
- Vijayasree as Kamalam
- Sujatha as Omana
- Sankaradi as Veluppillai
- T. R. Omana as Eeswari
- Paul Vengola as Anthony
- Muthukulam Raghavan Pilla as Beedi Maker
- Adoor Bhavani as Kalyani
- G. K. Pillai as Pankippillai
- Paravoor Bharathan as Mute
- Sadhana
- Thodupuzha Radhakrishnan as Kumaran
- Muthukulam
- Baby Lakshmi

== Songs ==
This film has popular songs written by Sreekumaran Thampi and composed by V. Dakshinamoorthy.

No.	Song	Singers	Lyrics	Length (m:ss)
1	Ammathan Kanninamritha	S. Janaki	Sreekumaran Thampi	
2	Chenthengu Kulacha	K. J. Yesudas	Sreekumaran Thampi	
3	Sandhyaykkenthinu Sindooram	P. Jayachandran	Sreekumaran Thampi	
4	Valampiri Shankil	S. Janaki	Sreekumaran Thampi	
5	Kaattile Poomaramaadyam	P Madhuri	Sreekumaran Thampi	
6	Dhanumaasathil Thiruvaathira	P Leela, Chorus	Sreekumaran Thampi	
