= O. V. Vijayan Memorial =

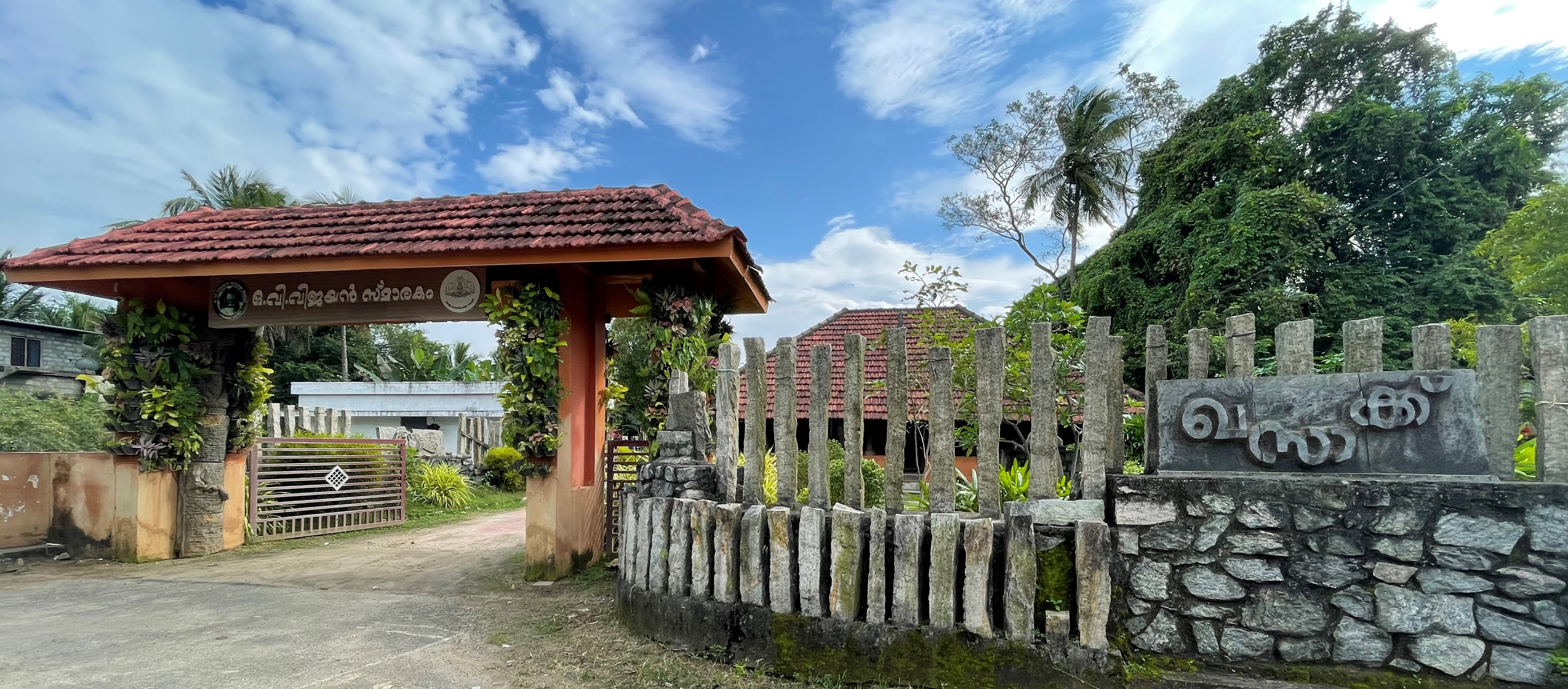
- Interactive map of the O. V. Vijayan Memorial area

General information
- Location: Thaskrak, Kannadi, Palakkad, Kerala, India
- Coordinates: 10.7255°N 76.68581°E
- Year built: 2015

O. V. Vijayan Memorial, set up in memory of the noted Malayalam writer, O. V. Vijayan, is a cultural centre located at Thasrak, a village in Kannadi, in Palakkad district of the south Indian state of Kerala. It is the setting of O. V. Vijayan's novel, Khasakkinte Itihasam. The centre is a memorial which reconstructs a number of images from the novel and was established in 2015, by the Government of Kerala.

== Overview ==
O. V. Vijayan Memorial comprises a small house, supposedly the 'njattupura' (barn house) where Ravi, the protagonist of Khasakkinte Ithishasam temporarily resided and taught children, a conference hall, a museum and a live theatre. The museum houses many cartoons and paintings by O. V. Vijayan. In 2024, Arabikkulam (pond of the Arabs), a place mentioned multiple times in the novel, was recreated within the compound of the centre. The Memorial is a favorite spot for travellers with literary aptitude and several statues of Vijayan and his characters are displayed inside the compound.

The centre was renovated and opened to public on March 29, 2015, by K. C. Joseph, the then Minister of Culture of the Government of Kerala. The statue of the writer was unveiled in 2017 by A. K. Balan. The centre is managed by O. V. Vijayan Smaraka Samiti, a committee appointed by the Government of Kerala. The Memorial has hosted a number of literary and cultural events. The distribution of O. V. Vijayan Memorial Literary Awards, a literary award instituted by the Samiti is done at the centre annually.

== Gallery ==
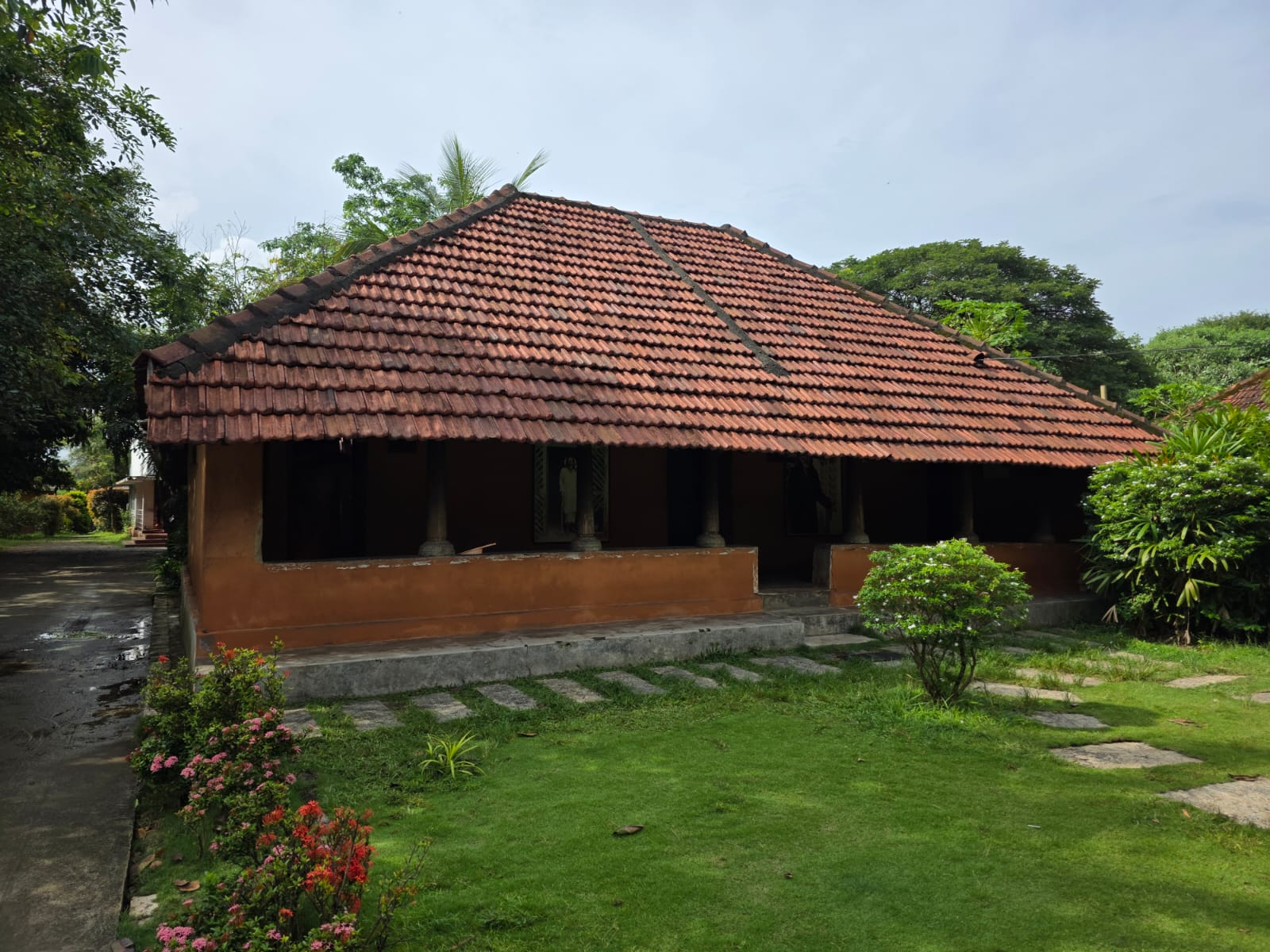
Njattupura (barn house) at O V Vijayan Memorial

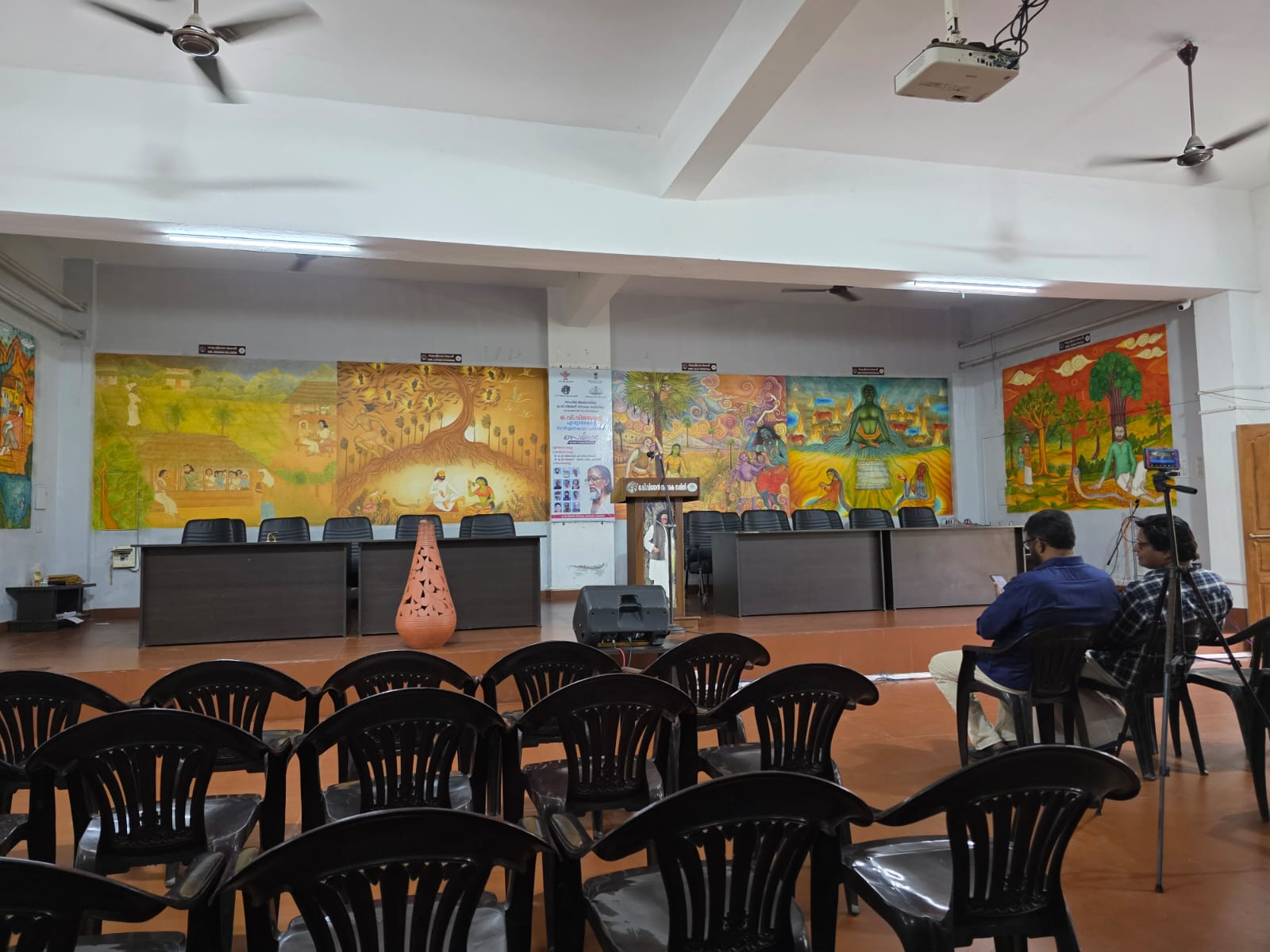
Conference hall at O V Vijayan Memorial

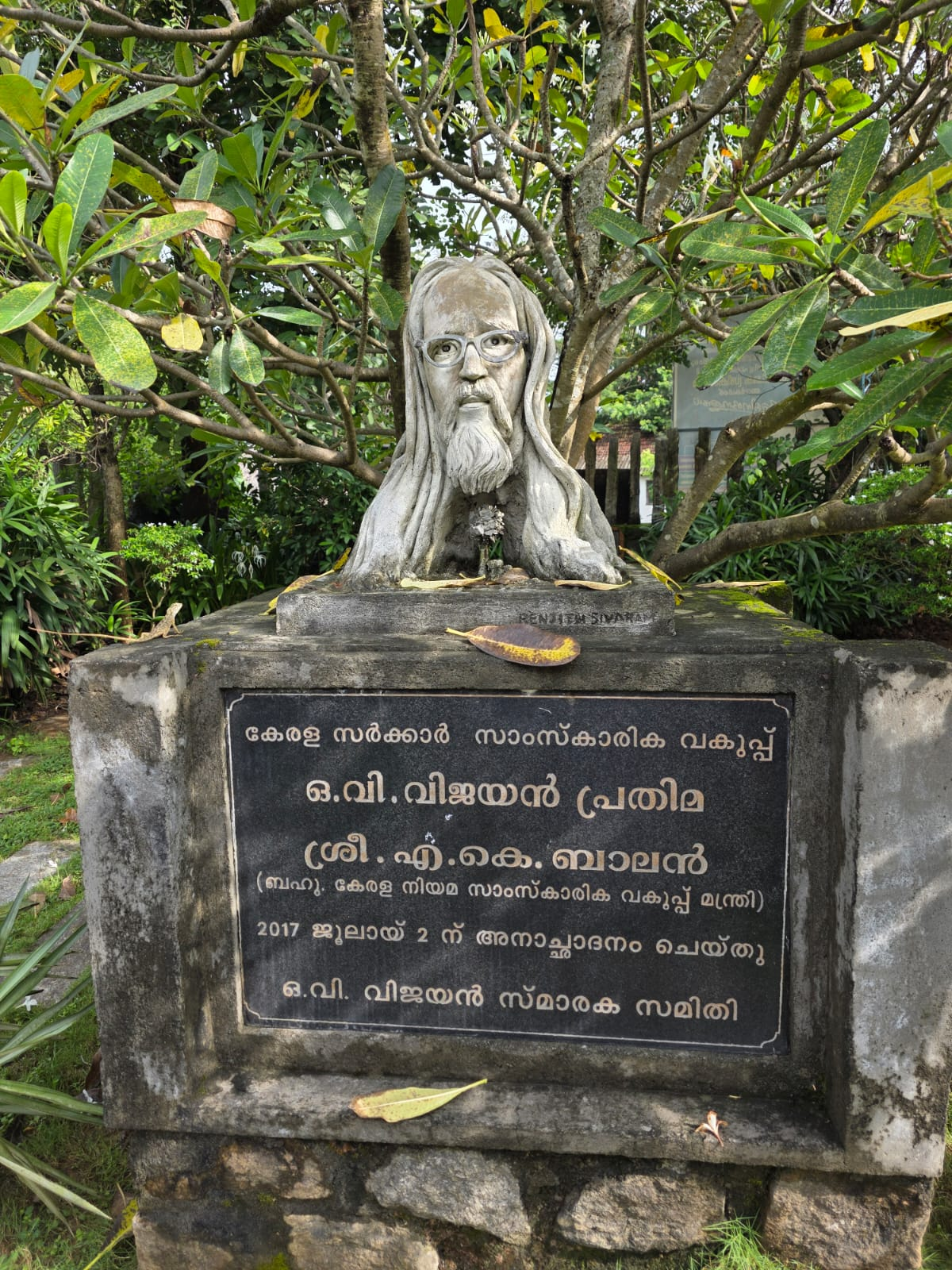
OV Vijayan statue at O V Vijayan Memorial

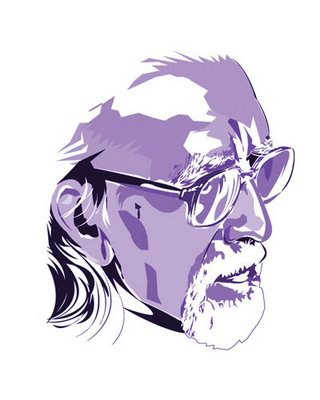
O. V. Vijayan

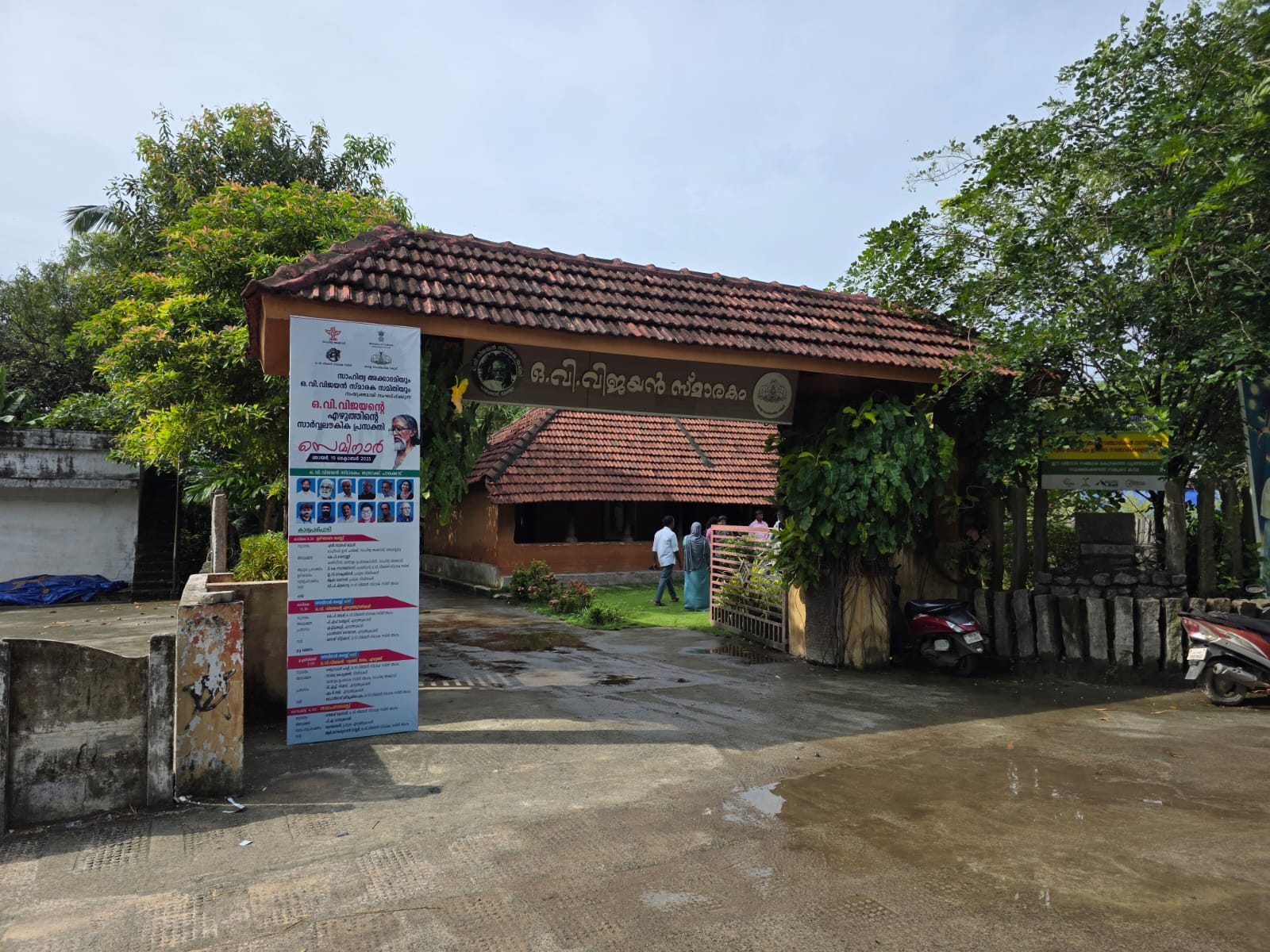
O V Vijayan Memorial front view

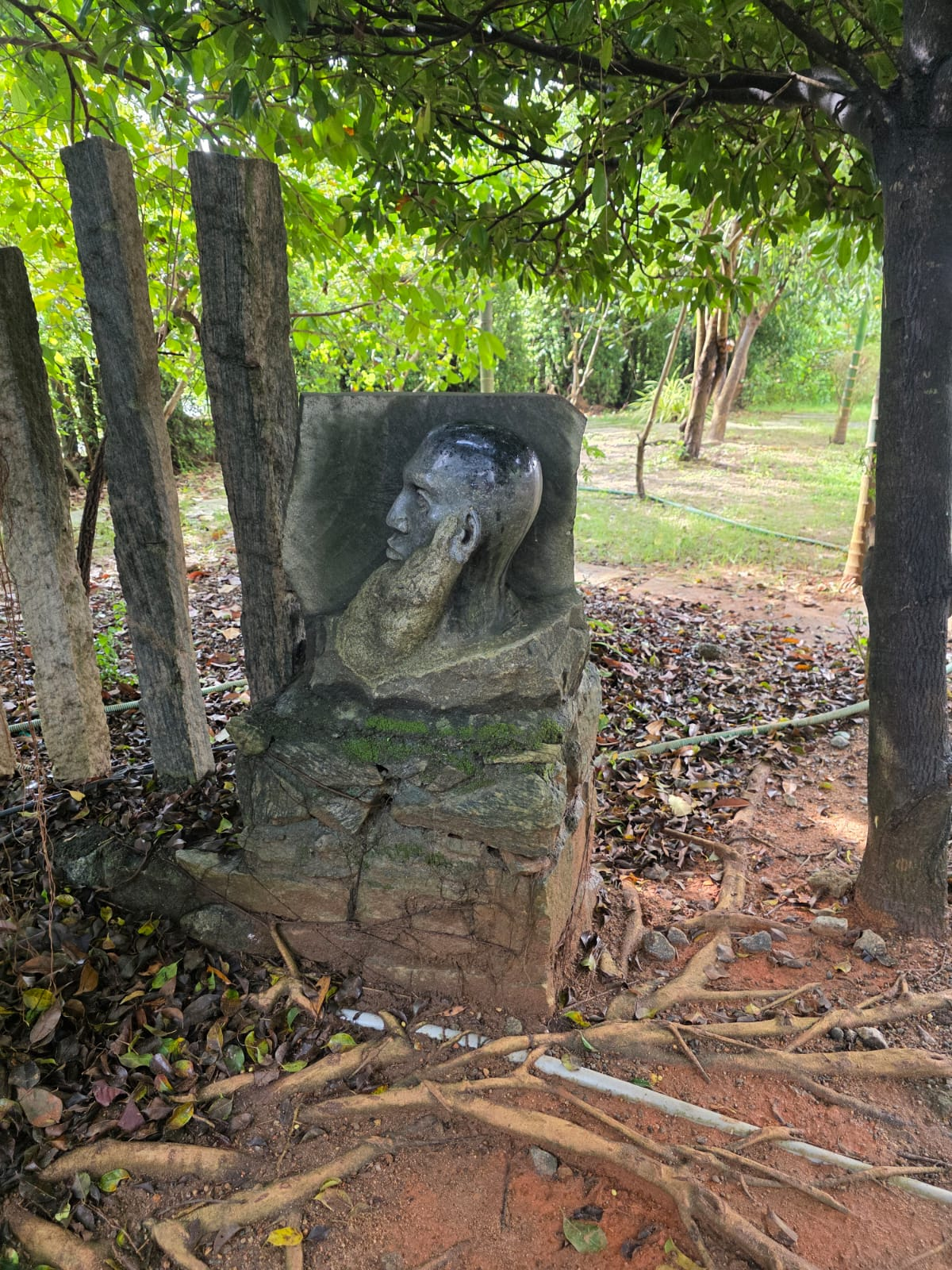
Mullakka statue at O V Vijayan Memorial

== See also ==
- Vallathol Museum
