= T. V. Kochubava =

Indian writer

- Born: 28 November 1955; Kattoor, Thrissur, Kerala, India
- Died: 25 November 1999 (aged 43); Kozhikode, Kerala
- Occupations: Novelist, writer
- Spouse: Zeenath
- Relatives: Veeravu (father); Beevathu (mother)
- Writing career
- Notable works: Vridhasadanam; Jalamalika; Perumkaliyattam; Soochikkuzhayil Oru Yacob; Upajanmam
- Notable awards: 1989 Ankanam Award; 1989 SBT Award; 1995 Cherukad Award; 1996 Kerala Sahitya Akademi Award for Novel; 1997 Thoppil Ravi Award; 1997 V. P. Sivakumar Keli Award

T. V. Kochubava (1955–1999) was an Indian writer of Malayalam literature, known for his novels and short stories. He published twenty-three books covering the genres of novels, short stories, translations and plays and was a recipient of a number of awards including the Kerala Sahitya Akademi Award for Novel in 1996, besides several other honours.

== Biography ==
Kochubava was born on 28 November 1955 at Kattoor village in Thrissur district of the south Indian state of Kerala to Veeravu, a coir merchant and his wife, Beevathu, in a family with limited financial resources. After early schooling at St. George's Convent UP School, Karanchira and Pompei St. Mary's High Secondary School, Kattoor, he graduated from Sree Narayana College, Nattika before moving to Sharjah to work at a private company for the next two decades. On his return to India, he joined Gulf Voice as its editor and settled in Kozhikode.

Kochubava was married to Zeenath and the couple had a son and a daughter. He died on 25 November 1999, at the age of 43, of a heart attack.

== Legacy and honours ==
He authored 23 books, including a play, novels and short story anthologies. Vridhasadanam, the Kerala Sahitya Akademi Award winning novel, short story anthologies such as Eppozhethumo Entho and Prarthanakalode Nilkkunnu and Checkuthan Arrestil, a play, feature among his notable works. He also wrote one screenplay, Balloon, which won the first prize in the screenplay competition conducted by Nana Film Weekly in 1981. It was adapted into a movie the next year under the same name, in which Mukesh made his acting debut. Jalamalika, his short story anthology, is a prescribed text for BA Malayalam course at Pondicherry University.

Kochubava received the Ankanam Award in 1989 for his anthology, Soochikkuzhayil Oru Yacob, the book also received the State Bank of Travancore Literary Award the next year. He received one more award in 1995, the Cherukad Award for his novel, Vridhasadanam; Kerala Sahitya Akademi also picked the book for their annual award for novel in 1996. He received two more award in 1997, the Thoppil Ravi Award for his novel, Upajanmam and the V. P. Sivakumar Keli Award for the anthology, Jalamalika.

T. V. Kochubava Literary Award is an eponymous award instituted in his memory, for recognising excellence in Malayalam literature; the recipients include Akbar Kakkattil, Sandeep Pampally and K. Rekha. Balachandran Vadakkedath, a writer friend of Kochubava, published a book, Janmasradham, in 2014, which features his biography as well as a critical study of his works. Vadakkedath also published another book on Kochubava, under the title, Kochubhava Kathayum Kaalavum.

== Bibliography ==
=== Novels ===
- Kochubava, T. V. (1986). Soochikkuzhayil oru yakkob. Trivandram: Prabatham Book House.
- Kochubava, T. V. (1989). Jaathakam. Kozhikode, Malayalam.
- Kochubava, T. V. (1996). Perunkaliyaattam. Kottayam, DCB.
- Kochubava, T. V. (1996). Virunnu mesayilekku nilavilikalode. Kottayam: D C.
- Kochubava, T. V. (1996). Vruddhasadanam. Kottayam: D C books.
- Kochubava, T. V. (1997). Upajanmam. Kozhikode, Mulberry.
- Kochubava, T. V. (2000). Theranjeduttha laghu Novelukal. Thrissur: Current Books.
- Kochubava, T. V. (2012). T V Kochubavayude novellakal. Kottayam: D C Books.

=== Short stories ===
- Kochubava, T. V. (1982). Onnangane Onningane. Irinjalakkuda: Samsaram publication.
- Kochubava, T. V. (1990). Kalikalkkum pookkalkkum.
- Kochubava, T. V. (1992). Irachiyum kunthirikkavum. Kollam, Imprint.
- Kochubava, T. V. (1992). Prachannam. Kottayam, DCB.
- Kochubava, T. V. (1993). Kinarukal. Kasaragode, Kalakshethram.
- Kochubava, T. V. (1994). Praarthanakalote nilkkunnu. Kottayam: D. C. Books.
- Kochubava, T. V. (1994). Grihapaadham. Kozhikode, Aksharam publications.
- Kochubava, T. V. (1995). Katha. Kottayam, Current.
- Kochubava, T. V. (1996). Snaanam. Kozhikode, Poorna.
- Kochubava, T. V. (1997). Avathaarika bhoopadangalkku. Kottayam, DCB.
- Kochubava, T. V. (1997). Jalamalika.
- Kochubava, T. V. (1999). Eppozhethumo entho ?. Thrissur: Current Books.
- Kochubava, T. V. (1999). Kathayum jeevithavum onnayi theerunnathineppatti. Kottayam: D. C. Books.
- Kochubava, T. V. (1999). Villanmaar samsaarikkumpol. Kottayam, D C Books. ISBN 9788126400584.
- Kochubava, T. V. (2002). Bhoomishasthram. Kottayam: D. C. Books. ISBN 9788126405459.
- Kochubava, T. V. (2006). Kochubavayute kochu kathakal. Kozhikode: Poorna. ISBN 9788130003610.
- Kochubava, T. V (2006). Vrddhapuraanam: kathakal. Thrissur, Green Books. ISBN 9788184230192.
- Kochubava, T. V. (2013). Veedippol nishabdhamanu. Kozhikode: Lead Books.

=== Translations ===
- Gibran, Kahlil; Kochubava (translator), T. V.; Vincent (translator), K. V. (1996). Pravanchakante udyanam. Kozhikode: Mulberry Publications.

== See also ==
- List of Malayalam-language authors by category
- List of Malayalam-language authors
