= Oru Vazhiyum Kure Nizhalukalum =

Malayalam-language novel by Rajalakshmi

Oru Vazhiyum Kure Nizhalukalum (A Path And Many Shadows) is the Malayalam-language debut novel by the Indian writer Rajalakshmi. Rajalakshmi was the first woman and third recipient to win the Kerala Sahitya Akademi Award for Novel in 1960 for the novel. The novel was also adapted into a television serial broadcast as a play by All India Radio.

== Plot ==
The novel follows Ramani, known as Mani, from her childhood into adulthood. Growing up in a strict household with an overbearing father and a bedridden mother, Mani's early life is shaped by her family relationships, her friendship with an elderly Velichapaadu, and her childhood bond with her Muracherukan, Appu.

As a young woman, Mani attends college, where she becomes known for her poetry and forms a close friendship with her roommate Ammini. She develops an unspoken infatuation with the poet Madhav Menon after they independently write similar poems for their college magazine. Her feelings for Madhav inspire her to begin writing anonymous love poetry. However, she eventually discovers that Madhav views marriage largely through family obligations and practical considerations. His conditions for marrying her destroy the romantic ideal she had formed around him, leaving her resentful of the interference of others in her personal life.

Meanwhile, Appu's life deteriorates following the death of his father. He abandons his studies, struggles to find work in Bombay, and eventually returns home in poor health. Mani's emotional difficulties and the interference of others also affect her education, preventing her from continuing to a master's degree.

The novel concludes with Appu writing to Mani and asking her to be with him, despite believing himself unworthy of her. Mani ultimately returns to her childhood relationship with Appu, bringing her journey from childhood, through love and disappointment, into adulthood to a close.

== English translation ==
It has been translated into English by R.K. Jayasree as "A Path and Many Shadows".
