= Khalid (writer) =

Indian author (1930–1994)

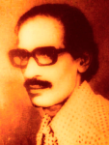
- Born: 10 October 1930; Cochin, Kingdom of Cochin
- Died: 1 October 1994 (aged 63); Cochin, Kerala, India
- Occupation: Novelist
- Spouse: Saleema Khalid
- Children: Dr. K. K. Harris, K. K. Zameer
- Writing career
- Notable awards: Kerala Sahitya Akademi Award (1988)

K. P. Khalid (10 October 1930 – 1 October 1994) was an Indian author writing in the Malayalam language. In 1988, he won the Kerala Sahitya Akademi Award for Novel for his work Ore Deshakkaraya Njangal.

Born on 10 October 1930, Khalid was in Raipur, Madhya Pradesh for a long time, working in a transport company and later in a trading agency. His literary works include Pithave Ninte Koode, Udayasooryanethire, Thuramukham, Simham, Banarasi Babu, Ore Deshakkaraya Njangal, Adimakal Udamakal and Allahuvinte Makkal.
