= Rajalakshmi =

Indian writer

- Born: June 2, 1930; Cherpulassery, Palakkad district, Kerala, India
- Died: January 18, 1965 (aged 34); Kerala, India
- Occupation: Writer
- Relatives: Achutha Menon (father); Kuttimalu Amma (mother)
- Writing career
- Genres: Short story, novel, poetry
- Notable works: Oru Vazhiyum Kure Nizhalukalum; Njanenna Bhavam; Uchavelyilum Ilamnilavum
- Notable awards: 1960 Kerala Sahitya Akademi Award for Novel

Thakkathu Amayankottu Rajalakshmi (June 2, 1930 – January 18, 1965), better identified as Rajalakshmi, was an Indian novelist, short story writer and poet of Malayalam literature. She was the author of three novels, two poetry anthologies and a short story anthologies. Kerala Sahitya Akademi awarded her their annual award for novel in 1960, making her the third recipient of the award. Her novel, Oru Vazhiyum Kure Nizhalukalum, has been adapted into a tele-series as well as into a play by the All India Radio.

== Biography ==
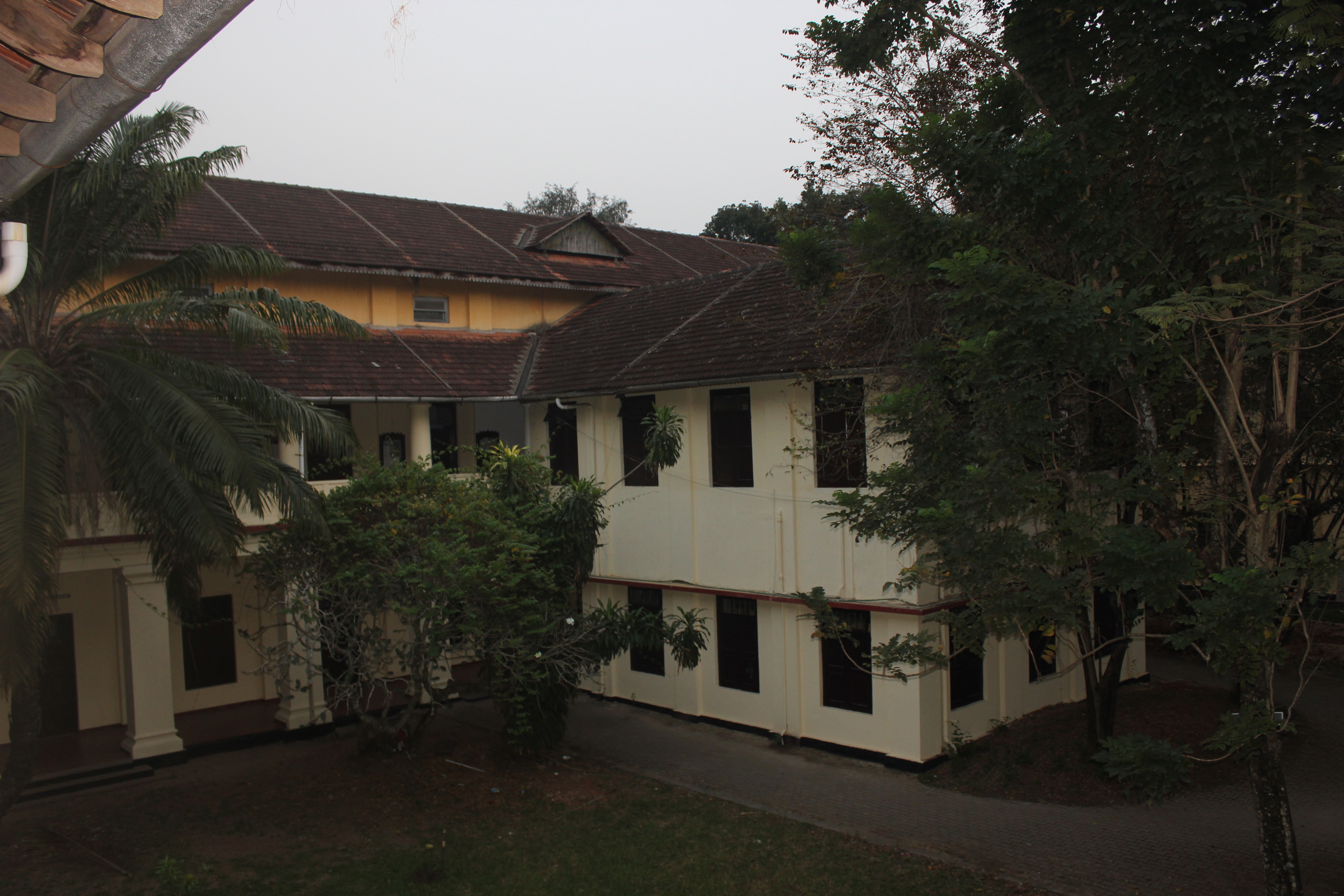
Maharaja's College, Rajalakshmi's alma mater

Rajalakshmi was born on June 2, 1930, at Cherpulassery, Palakkad district of the south Indian state of Kerala to Marath Achutha Menon and Thakkathu Amayankottu Kuttymalu Amma as their youngest daughter; T. A. Sarasvati Amma, who would later become a noted mathematician and scholar, was her elder sister. She graduated in physics from Maharaja's College, Ernakulam and joined the University College Thiruvananthapuram for MA Malayalam but discontinued to move to Banaras Hindu University from where she earned a master's degree in physics. Subsequently, she started her career as a lecturer and worked in different colleges of the Nair Service Society at Perunthanni, Pandalam and Ottappalam.

On January 18, 1965, Rajalakshmi started from home to College in the morning but returned home and committed suicide; her dead body was found in her room, hanging from the roof on a saree. She was aged 34 at that time.

== Legacy and honours ==
She is known as Emily Brontë of Malayalam. Makal, a short story published in Mathrubhumi weekly in 1956 was her first notable work, which was followed by a number seven short stories and a poem in prose. Besides the short stories and two poetry anthologies, she wrote three novels, starting with Oru Vazhiyum Kure Nizhalukalum (A Path and a Few Shadows) where she portrayed the delicate emotions of women. Oru Vazhiyum Kure Nizhalukalum fetched her the Kerala Sahitya Akademi Award for Novel in 1960, making her the third recipient of the honour. It later became a TV serial and was broadcast as a play by All India Radio. Her other novels are Njaneenna Bhavam and Uchaveyilum Ilam Nilavum while her notable poetry anthology is "Ninne Njan Snehikkunnu".

The 1967 novel Abhayam by Perumbadavam Sreedharan was based on Rajalakshmi's life. Abhayam, the 1970 film by Ramu Kariat, was an adaptation of this novel. Anita Nair, the Crossword Book Award winning author, has based her 2018 novel, Eating Wasps, on the life on Rajalakshmi.

== Bibliography ==
=== Novels ===
- Rajalakshmi (2005). Oru Vazhiyum Kure Nizhalukalum. Current Books Thrissur. ASIN B007E4WWMO.
- Rajalakshmi. Njanenna Bhavam (in Malayalam). Thrissur: Current Books.

=== Short stories ===
- Rajalakshmi (2005). Rajalakshmiyude Kadhakal. Current Books Thrissur. ISBN 9788122610581.
- Rajalakshmi (2006). Makal. Thrissur: Mangalodayam. ISBN 9788184230383.

=== Poetry ===
- Rajalakshmi (1994). Abhayavarnangal. Chethikode.
- Rajalakshmi. Paranjilla Ninnodu. Chethikode.

=== Translations ===
- Rajalakshmi (2016). A path and many shadows and twelve stories. Translated by R. K. Jayasree. Orient Black Swan. ISBN 9788125063513.

== See also ==
- List of Malayalam-language authors by category
- List of Malayalam-language authors
