= Maya (Surendran novel) =

Novel by K. Surendran

Maaya
- Author: K. Surendran
- Language: Malayalam
- Genre: Family drama
- Set in: Kerala
- Publisher: Poorna Publications
- Publication date: 2010
- Publication place: India
- Media type: Print (Paperback)
- Pages: 160
- Awards: Kerala Sahitya Academy award for Novel
- ISBN: 81-7180-882-4

Maaya (The Illusion) is a novel by K. Surendran. Maya addresses how materialism makes society hard. The novel received the Kerala Sahitya Akademi Award for Novel in 1962. The novel starts around the suicide of Decent Shankarapillai and follows the narrator narrating his life and experiences meeting him, and how he ended up committing suicide. It was also adapted into a movie of the same name in 1972 starring Prem Nazir as Madhavankutty and Thikkurissy Sukumaran Nair as Decent Sankarapillai by Ramu Kariat.

== Plot ==
Story is narrated by a writer/newspaper reporter named Madhavankutty who is a stand in for the author, and the story begins with him mentioning how unbelievable it is that someone like Decent Shankarapillai committed suicide. Though we are given hints as to the cause of his suicide is due to his daughter Gomathi.

The story then tracks the narrators experiences meeting and talking to Shankarapillai, and giving us an idea of him as a person and his life, from his growth from a bastard son of a namboothiri to his growth into business, his first marriage to his second marriage to his three kids, Omana from the first marriage and Gomathi and Raghu from the second, and how he runs a successful shop providing daily items to his customers, since the place where his shop is at is called Decent Mukku 9Decent corner) and hence how he got his name of Decent Shankarapillai, finally to narrators own bad experiences where Shankarapillai marries his daughter Gomathi off to someone named Vasukutty because his financial prospects are better than the narrator, as Vasukutty is the promised heir of his uncles fortune as his uncle doesnt have any kids of his own, for which the narrator despises him due to him being in love with Gomathi, and Gomathi loving him back. After a few years the narrator falls in love and marries another girl named Indira with whom he has a child.

As he is coming back to his hometown and is back on friendly terms with Shankarpillai, he tells us about the downfall of Shankarapillai, which started with a marriage prospect for Raghu where Vasukutty (Gomathi's husband) puts forward the idea of his sister being married to Raghu, and how his uncle who doesnt have any kids will pay 10000 rupees as dowry to him, and he agrees, but the uncle says he hasnt promised anyone anything, and not to conduct the marriage on hoping he will pay them dowry. So, Shankarapillai cancels the wedding, touting this reason, eventhough engagement is done. Vasukutty is upset at this, and tries to convince him to go through with marriage but he doesnt. So, concots a plan to take over shop since when Shankarapillai divided his assets between his kids, he gave Gomathi the shop and his son Raghu his house. So, Vasukutty, his goons and his wife, Gomathi and kids ask Shankarapillai to get out of the shop and shuts it down and starts living there. A man like shankarapillai who dedicated his entire life to his kids can't take the heartbreak of his kids turning against him, so he writes to the narrator and says he would be travelling across india since he doesnt have anything else to do, and he even coming to meet him in Trivandrum where the narrator works, and he is visibly shaken by the whole experience with kids, and kept saying it is better for old people to die if they arent gonna have any use or respect for the young. And his dead body is found by river, where we learn he committed suicide and was hoping his body wouldnt be found, and his family thinking he would be still travelling across india. As the funeral is done, the book ends with somebody setting fire to Shankarapillai's shop , by the grief and sadness of the whole experience,and her guilt over cuasing her fathers death Gomathi, and Vasukutty, narattor and everyone watches it burn instead of trying to save it.
