= Gurusagaram =

Book by O. V. Vijayan

- English language edition (1997) The Infinity of Grace
- Author: O. V. Vijayan
- Language: Malayalam
- Genre: Novel
- Publisher: DC Books
- Publication date: 1987
- Publication place: India
- Pages: 171
- Awards: Kendra Sahitya Akademi Award; Kerala Sahitya Akademi Award; Vayalar Award

Gurusagaram (The Infinity of Grace) is a 1987 novel written by O. V. Vijayan. The novel is a spiritual odyssey into the human psyche. It differs in language, vision and characterisation from Vijayan's earlier works such as Khasakkinte Itihasam and Dharmapuranam. It won many major awards including the Kendra Sahitya Akademi Award, Kerala Sahitya Akademi Award and Vayalar Award.

== Plot summary ==
Gurusagaram differs in language, vision and characterisation from Vijayan's earlier works. It is on the immanence of Guru in the life of the seeker. Guru is everywhere and is manifested in everybody. The seeker partakes of the grace of the Guru as he happens for him unawares and unconditional. The central character Kunjunni is a journalist from Kerala, working in Delhi, going on an assignment to report the Bengal partition of 1971. He undergoes an excruciating experience both spiritually and physically to learn how to annihilate all forms of ego. During his search for The teacher, he encounters teachers from all spheres of life, each of them teaching him lessons that help him on the way, and he in turn becoming teacher to many of them.

The beginning chapter gives an account of how his father becomes a teacher to him and the chain of teachers that begins from there continues till the last chapter where he discovers his ultimate guru. the range of teachers include his childhood friend Colonel Balakrishnan now Swami Nirmalanandan, Olga the Czech media person haunted by the aftermath of the war she had to endure, Haimavathi the girl whom he molested, Lalitha, the shorthand writer at his office, and many more characters from so diverse backgrounds. He's troubled by the separation from his wife Shivani, and is torn between her unwillingness to get back together and his love for their daughter Kalyani.

He often goes to Nirmalanandan to find solace, discussing himself with his friend. It's during such a visit that Kunjunni starts his journey along the lines of spirituality. On complaining about the restlessness in his life, Swami leaves him alone on the shores of the river where he finds the small insects living beneath grass fighting each other for their mere survival. This leads him to a new light and he leaves the place, learning to cultivate in him a respect, even for the grass that he steps on. "Angaye vedanippikkathe enikk nadannu kudallo" (I won't be able to walk without hurting you)- this sentence that he speaks to the grass on which he steps shows the intensity of the knowledge he has acquired at this point. Though enlightened by some pieces of knowledge, he's still troubled by the problems encircling him. It's in the middle of these difficulties that he's sent to Kolkata report the Bangladesh partition. Once there he revisits the places his father had taken him to as a child. Later we see him visiting these places again with his daughter, trying to transfer the knowledge he got from his father to his next generation. The specific transfer is supposed to occur at the time when they witness a flock of storks flying above, reminding Kunjunni of the enlightenment experience of Paramhamsa. He experiences something of the sort and this is transferred through him to his daughter too.

The war reporting, too, teaches him many lessons, the most prominent teacher being the Muslim father who decides to bury the Hindu girl who died holding hands with his son. The war and its violence seem to be the reflections of his own inner turmoil. The confusions he goes through and the fights that take place inside himself dies down as the war too comes to an end. But just like the war created the partition, the end of his problems too comes with a wound – the revelation by Shivani that Kalyani is not his daughter. Though the truth is painful at first, this is the factor that leads him to find his guru and attain his knowledge. He leaves his job and goes back home, giving away all his books but The Bhagavatam, maybe due to the realization that all these knowledge gave him nothing at all. In the last chapter we see Kunjunni finding his Guru in his daughter who was not his own. This makes him grow to the realisation that the whole world is a teacher, that each and everything, every person has a lesson to teach you. Thus his search for Guru ends in Kalyani, yet it seems as if his search begins in her. The love that he had stored solely for her grows as big as the world, being transferred to the whole world.

== Inner Thoughts ==
The novel, in its totality gives the message that humans are all tied by the bondage of karma. Karma refers to actions. The teacher that begins in his forefathers ending in his daughter is an example for this. Kalyani herself becomes an example, as her life's aim it seems had been enlightenment of Kunjunni. The way she's born from the wrong and yet she becomes the beacon for Kunjunni puzzles the reader to a certain degree. Another factor that shows the powerlessness of humans is the irony that Shivani's research was on blood cancer and her daughter died of the same disease.

Yet another thought presented is the futillity of the war. Through the many stories of war - from Kunjunni's elder brother to Olga and the Polish news reporter Yanush - Vijayan presents the conclusion that no war has ever produced good and what's usually left is the tears and pain of the victims. The war between himself and Shivani also ends in destruction as the two go separate ways.

The novel returns to the idea that teachers appear throughout everyday life. Vijayan shows this through the protagonist's meetings with characters from many different backgrounds, each of whom teaches him something new.

== Background ==
According to Vijayan, this novel was greatly inspired by the teachings of Karunakaraguru of Sree Santhigiri Ashram near Thiruvananthapuram. Vijayan underwent a spiritual transformation after meeting the guru and this change also reflected in his writings, the best example being Gurusagaram.

== Awards ==
- 1990: Kendra Sahitya Akademi Award
- 1990: Kerala Sahitya Akademi Award
- 1991: Vayalar Award
