= G. Vivekanandan =

Indian Malayalam language writer

- Born: 5 May 1923 near Kovalam, Travancore (present Kerala), India
- Died: 23 January 1999 (aged 75); Kerala
- Occupation: Writer
- Notable work: Sruthibhangam; Kallichellamma
- Awards: 1986 Kerala Sahitya Akademi Award for Novel

G. Vivekanandan (5 May 1923 – 23 January 1999) was an Indian writer of the Malayalam literature. He is author of many works in the categories of novel, drama and collection of stories. He won the Kerala Sahitya Akademi Award for Novel in 1986.

== Biography ==
Vivekanandan was born on 5 May 1923 to Govindan and Lakshmi at Kolliyur near Kovalam. His primary education was in Poonkulam School. After that, he completed his schooling in Venganur English Middle School and Nellimood High School. He passed the compounder exam and later joined the army during Second World War. After serving in the war zones, he came back and became a compounder at the Thiruvananthapuram Government Hospital. He then studied privately and obtained intermediate and B.A degree. Before completing his master's, Vivekanandan joined Akashvani as an announcer. Later worked as a script writer and news reader at Akashavani . He then worked at the Public Relations Department as the cultural relations officer before returning to Akashvani again. He married P. Lalitha in 1959. Vivekanandan retired from government service while serving as the managing director of the Kerala State Film Development Corporation. Chitranjali Studio was established during his tenure as director. After retirement, he also worked in Kerala Kaumudi.

Vivekanandan's literary contribution includes 20 novels, 15 collections of stories and 6 plays. Sruthibhangam, Kallichellamma, Ward Number Seven, Yakshiparamba, Himamanusyan, Ammu, and Silent Waves are his main works. His novel Sruthibhangam won the Kerala Sahitya Akademi Award for Novel in 1986. His another work Kallichellamma hit the big screen in 1969 as a Malayalam film. The film was directed by P Bhaskaran for which Vivekanandan himself wrote the screenplay and dialogues. He then went on to write stories for many films such as Shastran Jaichu Manushyan Thottu, Mazhakkar, Taxi Driver, Ward Number Seven, Oru Yugasandhya, Visa among the many. Vivekanandan died on 23 January 1999.
