= Haritha Savithri =

Indian author

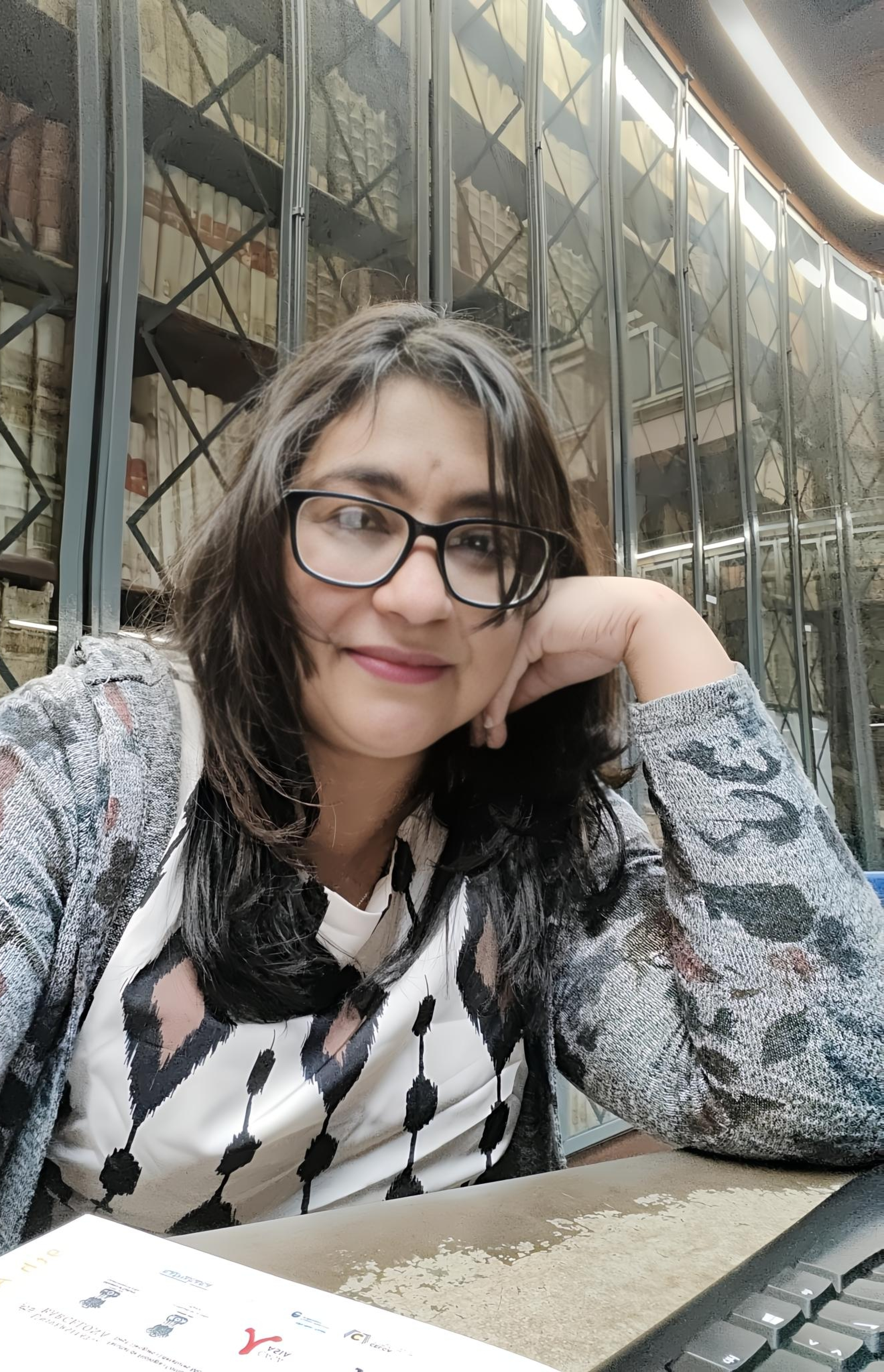
- Haritha Savithri
- Born: Karunagappally, Kollam District, Kerala, India)
- Occupation: Novelist
- Writing career
- Language: Malayalam
- Genres: Novel, travelogue, essays
- Notable works: Murivettavarude Pathakal, Zin, Spanish Nadodikkadhakal
- Notable awards: Kerala Sahitya Akademi Award

Haritha Savithry is a Malayalam writer, human rights activist and translator. She was awarded the Kerala Sahitya Akademi Award in 2022 for the travalogue Murivettavarude Pathakal in 2022 and for the novel Zîn in 2023.

== Early life and family ==
She was born at Karunagappalli, a small town in the district of Kollam in Kerala. She completed her post graduation in English Literature from the University of Kerala and went on to study in the University of Barcelona. She got her Masters Degree from the University of Barcelona in 'Construction and Representation of Cultural Identity'.

She is doing doctoral research in the university of Barcelona in English philology now.

== Bibliography ==
=== Travalogue ===
- Murivettavarute Pathakal

=== Translations ===
- Tulip of Istanbul by İskender Pala
- The Crossing by Samar Yazbek
- The Cry of a Swallow by Ahmet Ümit
- A Stranger in Baghdad: A Novel Elizabeth Loudon

=== Fiction ===
- Zin
- Qurban
- Roohi (short story collection)
- Marilia (written for young adults)

=== Children's literature ===
- Spanish Nadodikathakal

== Awards ==
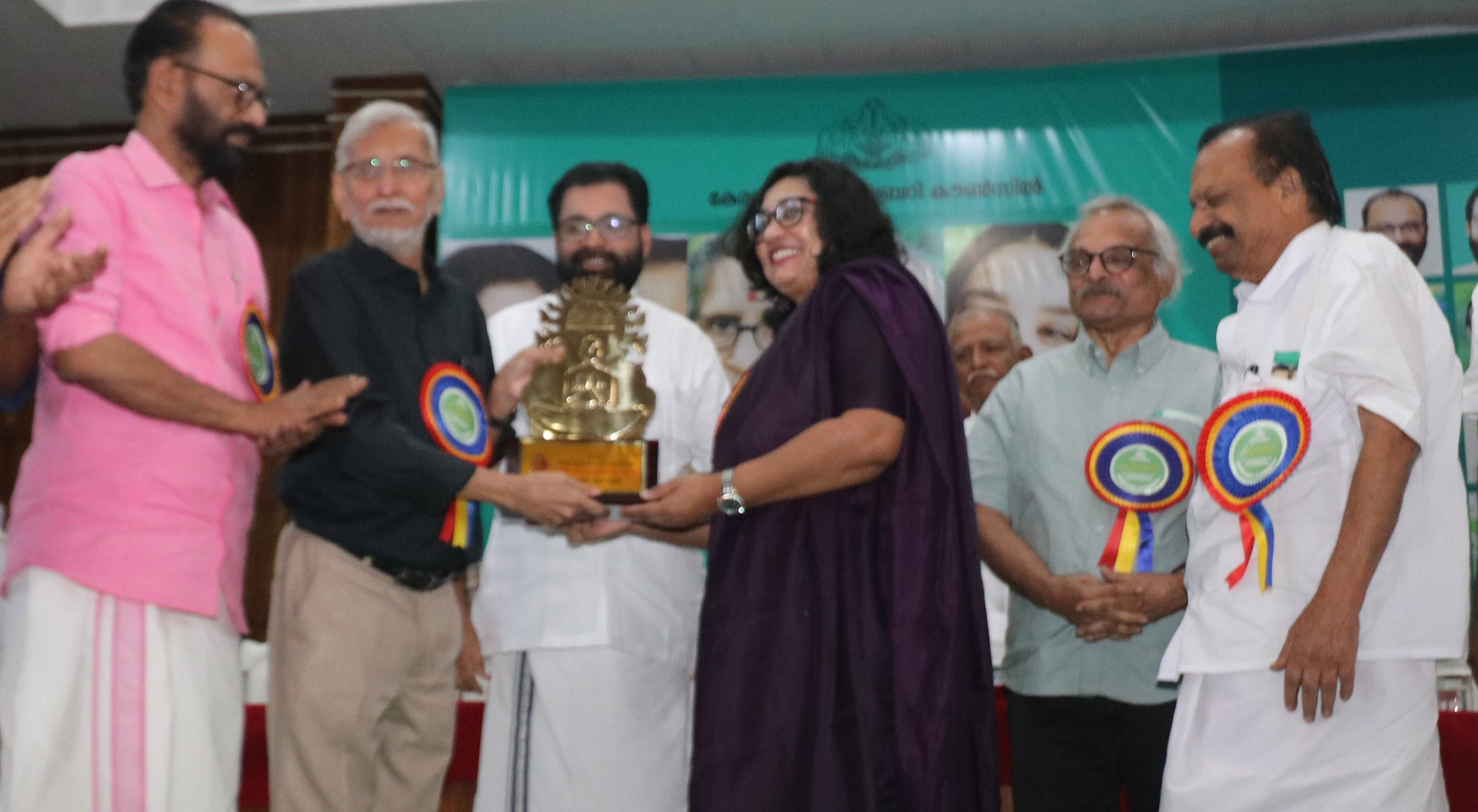
Haritha Savithri receiving stateLibrary council award at Kollam 2024

- Kerala Sahitya Akademi Award for the travelogue Murivettavarude Pathakal in 2022
- Kerala Sahitya Akademi Award for the novel Zîn in 2023.
- Kadammanitta Award given by the Kerala State Library Council for Zin in 2024
- Sharjah Indian association literary award for Zin.
