= O. V. Vijayan =

Indian writer and cartoonist

Ottupulackal Velukkuty Vijayan
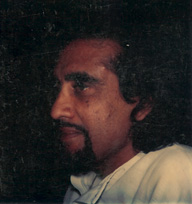
- Born: 2 July 1930; Palakkad, Malabar District, Madras Presidency, British India
- Died: 30 March 2005 (aged 74); Hyderabad, Andhra Pradesh (Now Telangana), India
- Occupations: Novelist, short story writer, cartoonist, journalist
- Spouse: Teresa Vijayan
- Children: Madhu Vijayan
- Relatives: O. V. Usha (sister)
- Writing career
- Genres: Novel, short story, essays
- Subject: Social aspects
- Notable awards: 1970 Odakkuzhal Award; 1990 Sahitya Akademi Award; 1990 Kerala Sahitya Akademi Award; 1991 Vayalar Award; 1992 Muttathu Varkey Award; 2001 Ezhuthachan Award; 2001 Kerala Sahitya Akademi Fellowship; 2003 Padma Bhushan; 2004 Mathrubhumi Literary Award
- Movements: Modernism, Magical realism

Ottupulackal Velukkuty Vijayan (2 July 1930 – 30 March 2005), commonly known as O. V. Vijayan, was an Indian author and cartoonist, who was an important figure in modern Malayalam literature. Best known for his first novel Khasakkinte Itihasam (1969), Vijayan was the author of six novels, nine short-story collections, and nine collections of essays, memoirs and reflections.

Born in Palakkad in 1930, Vijayan graduated from Victoria College in Palakkad and obtained a master's degree in English literature from Presidency College, Madras. He wrote his first short story, "Tell Father Gonsalves", in 1953. Khasakkinte Itihasam (The Legends of Khasak), Vijayan's first novel, appeared in 1969. It set off a great literary revolution and cleaved the history of Malayalam fiction into pre-Khasak and post-Khasak. While Khasakkinte Itihasam continues to be his best-known work as an angry young man, his later works, Gurusagaram (The Infinity of Grace), Pravachakante Vazhi (The Path of the Prophet) and Thalamurakal (Generations) bespeak a mature transcendentalist.

Vijayan authored many volumes of short stories, which range from the comic to the philosophical and show a diversity of situations, tones and styles. Vijayan translated most of his own works from Malayalam to English. He was also an editorial cartoonist and political observer and worked for news publications including The Statesman and The Hindu.

== Early life ==
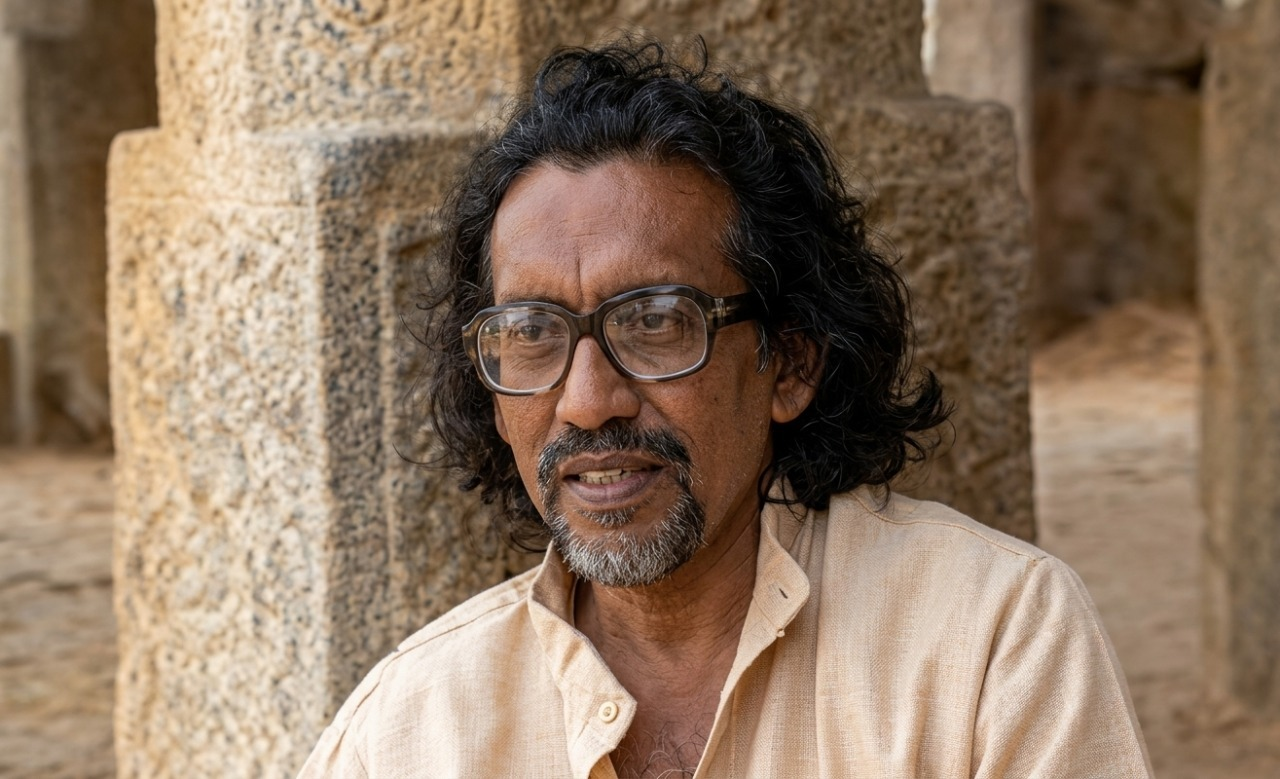
O V Vijayan

O. V. Vijayan was born on 2 July 1930 at Vilayanchaathanoor village in Palakkad district in Kerala. Born premature in the seventh month, Vijayan was sickly from childhood and spent most of his time confined to his room. His father O. Velukkutty was an officer in Malabar Special Police of the erstwhile Madras Province in British India. His youngest sister O. V. Usha is a Malayalam poet. As a child, Vijayan was largely homeschooled. Formal schooling began at the age of twelve, when he joined Raja's High School, Kottakkal in Malabar, directly into sixth grade. The informal education arranged by his father during his absentee years was sufficient to keep him at par with his peers. The following year, Velukkutty was transferred and Vijayan joined the school at Koduvayur in Palakkad. He graduated from Victoria College in Palakkad and obtained a master's degree in English literature from Presidency College. Vijayan taught for some time at Malabar Christian College, Kozhikode, and Victoria College before opting for journalism.

== Literary career ==
=== Khasakkinte Itihasam ===
When the bus came to its final halt in Koomankavu, the place did not seem unfamiliar to Ravi. He had never been there before, but he had seen himself coming to this forlorn outpost beneath the immense canopy of trees, with its dozen shops and shacks raised on piles; he had seen it all in recurrent premonitions – the benign age of the trees, the river bark and roots arched above the earth.
(the opening paragraph of Khasakkinte Itihasam)

Khasakkinte Itihasam (The Legends of Khasak), Vijayan's first novel, which took twelve years' writing and rewriting to reach its final form, was published in 1969. A year before, it was serialized in Mathrubhumi weekly for 28 weeks starting from January 28, 1968 and set off a great literary revolution and cleaved the history of Malayalam fiction into pre-Khasak and post-Khasak eras. The former era was romantic and formal; the latter is modernist, post-modernist and post-post-modernist, with tremendous experimentation in style and content. The novel, which has drawn comparisons with One Hundred Years of Solitude of Gabriel García Márquez, is about Ravi, a teacher in an informal education centre in Khasak, and his existential crises. The central character is shown as a visionary who completed his post graduate programme in Physics from a college at Tambaram. The novel ends when Ravi begins his journey to some other realms of existence. The existential puzzle of man as to why he should exist is explored in this novel. The novel introduced a new poetic style of prose, combining Tamil and Palakkad dialect of Malayalam. It also introduced a narrative style that moved forth from reality to myths and back. The work was later adapted as a play by Deepan Sivaraman.

=== Dharmapuranam ===
Dharmapuranam (The Saga of Dharmapuri, 1985) is outwardly a great political satire where the author knows no restraint in lampooning political establishments. The works attempts to lampoon modes of governance through its characters and the setting. The central character is Sidhartha, modelled after Gautama Buddha, whose personality is shown to lead people to enlightenment. Though satirical in its tone, the novel has a spiritual level, too. Malayalanadu weekly announced that the novel would be serialised from July 1975, but the plan was dropped when the Emergency was proclaimed on June 25, 1975. The novel was finally serialised only in 1977, after the Emergency was lifted and it proved to be prophetic. There were hindrances for its publication as well due to its sexual-scatological language and imagery and as the atrocities perpetrated during Emergency were still haunting the public. Finally, it was published in 1985. Two years later, Penguin Books published the English translation and the book drew critical reviews. ...dangerous stuff and cut close to the bone were the words of David Selbourne, in The Times Literary Supplement and Khushwant Singh rated the novel as not the kind of novel you forget in a hurry. Vijayan himself described it as a cleansing act that he had no desire to repeat.

=== Later novels ===
The third novel, Gurusagaram (The Infinity of Grace, 1987) differs in language, vision and characterisation from the earlier works. It is on the immanence of Guru in the life of the seeker. Guru is everywhere and is manifested in everybody. The seeker partakes of the grace of the Guru as he happens for him unawares and unconditional. The central character is a journalist from Kerala, working in Delhi, going on an assignment to report the Indo-Pak war of 1971. He undergoes an excruciating experience both spiritually and physically to learn how to annihilate all forms of ego. Gurusagaram fetched him the Vayalar Award, the central Sahitya Akademi Award and the Kerala Sahithya Academy Award in 1991.

Madhuram Gayathi (1990) has been termed as "a fantastic allegory fusing mythology, spirituality and ecology". It is an allegorical fable of the post-Holocaust world with its lovelessness and disharmony. Pravachakante Vazhi (The Path of the Prophet; 1992) emphasises the vision that intuition is perennial and it is one and the same always. This oneness of the revelation makes the ways of all prophets the same. This great education in spirituality is got in those barbarous days of Delhi when the Sikhs were maniacally hunted after and mercilessly butchered following the murder of Indira Gandhi. Vijayan's last novel Thalamurakal (Generations; 1997) is autobiographical to a great extent. It is historical to a still greater extent. Beyond autobiography and history, the novel is a journey down the collective experiences of a family in search of an awareness about oneself and his clan. This search is of great importance when the collective experiences of the subculture are very bitter and the individual sense of the clan identity is much superior. The novel is a narration of four generations in Ponmudi family in Palakkad, Kerala.

=== Other literary works ===
He wrote his first short story, "Tell Father Gonsalves", in 1953. He wrote many volumes of short stories, the first volume of which was published in 1957 – Three Wars. The stories, which range from the comic to the philosophical, show an astonishing diversity of situations, tones and styles. O. V. Vijayan's best known collection in English is After the Hanging and Other Stories which contains several jewel-like masterpieces, in particular the title story about a poor, semi-literate peasant going to the jail to receive the body of his son who has been hanged; The Wart and The Foetus about the trauma of the fascist Emergency; the transcendental The Airport, The Little Ones, and several others. He also wrote many essays, and also published one book of cartoons- Ithiri Neramboke, Ithiri Darshanam (A Little Pastime, A little Vision) – 1990. Itihasathinte Itihasam, a historical treatise written by him is considered by many as masterpiece.

An incisive writer in English as well, Vijayan translated most of his own works from Malayalam to English. Selected works have been published by Penguin India. His own translations of his stories into English – After Hanging and Other Stories and Selected Stories and the novels, The Saga of Dharmapuri, The Legend of Khasak and The Infinity of Grace – have had a pan-Indian appeal, though many have been critical of the freedoms he took with his own works as well as his English style.

At the Wayanad Literature Festival, N. S. Madhavan discusses how O. V. Vijayan's writing was a pioneering force in the magical realism sphere of Malayalam Literature.

== Cartoons ==
Vijayan left his home state in 1958 to pursue his career as a cartoonist in Delhi. Joining the famous Shankar's Weekly, Delhi, as a cartoonist and writer of political satire, he moved to Patriot as a staff cartoonist in 1963. Vijayan was also an editorial cartoonist and political observer in various news publications – The Statesman and The Hindu – and later turned freelancer. His cartoons also appeared in publications such as Far Eastern Economic Review and The New York Times. Philosophy and politics merged in his cartoons, just as revolution and spirituality coalesced in his writings. His searing comment on Indira Gandhi's Emergency rule and about her return to power in 1980 would remain high points in the history of Indian cartooning.

== Later life and death ==
Vijayan was married to Theresa Gabriel, an academic and the couple had a son, Madhu. He was afflicted with Parkinson's disease for 20 years and in early March 2005, he was admitted to Care Hospital, Hyderabad where he succumbed to organ failure on 30 March 2005 aged 74, survived by his wife and son. His body was taken to Kerala by special flight and was cremated with full state honours at Ivor Madom crematorium in Pambadi, Thrissur near Thiruvilwamala on the banks of the Bharathapuzha where his nephew, Ravi Shankar, a known cartoonist, lit the pyre. Teresa Vijayan died a year after his death, and his son lives in the US.

== Awards and honours ==
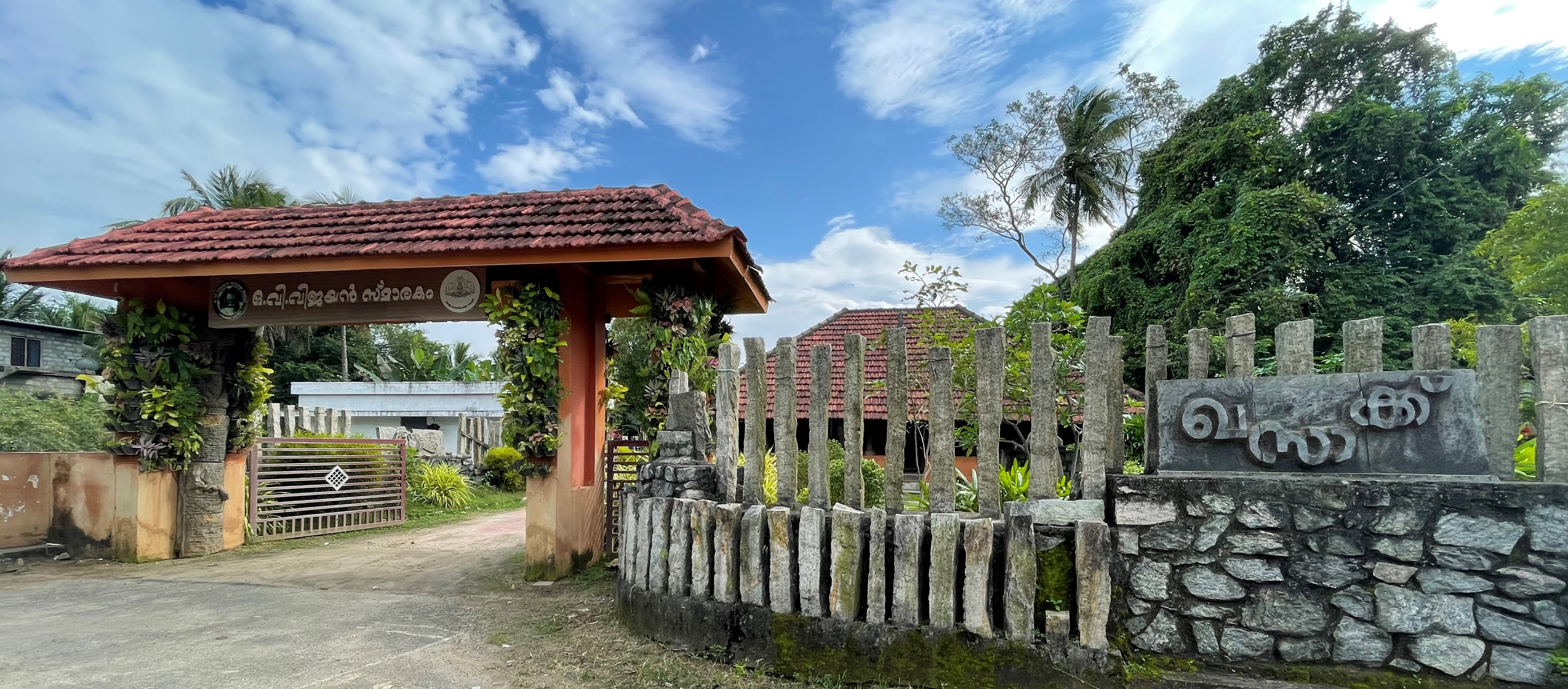
O.V Vijayan Memorial by Kerala Government at Thasrak, Palaghat, Kerala

Vijayan received the Odakkuzhal Award for Khasakkinte Itihasam in 1970. His third novel, Gurusagaram, brought him three awards, Sahitya Akademi Award and Kerala Sahitya Akademi Award for Novel in 1990 and Vayalar Award in 1991. When Muttathu Varkey Award was instituted in 1992, he received the inaugural award. The Government of Kerala awarded him the Ezhuthachan Puraskaram, their highest literary honour, in 2001, the same year as he was inducted as an honorary fellow by Kerala Sahitya Akademi. The Government of India awarded him the Padma Bhushan, the third highest civilian honor, in 2003. Mathrubhumi Literary Award, the last of the awards he received was in 2004, a year before his death. A memorial, O. V. Vijayan Memorial has been constructed by the Government of Kerala in Thasrak, the setting of his novel, Khasakkinte Ithihasam.

== O. V. Vijayan Literary Award ==
The O. V. Vijayan Sahitya Puraskaram (O. V. Vijayan Literary Award) was instituted by the Naveena Samskarika Kala Kendram, Hyderabad, in 2011, in memory of Vijayan who had spent his last days in Secunderabad. The award consists of a cash component of ₹50,001, a memento by Kanayi Kunhiraman, and a citation. The award is given to the best book of a writer during the year. Sarah Joseph, Zacharia, Vijayalakshmi, B. Rajeevan and Usha Kumari are some of the recipients of the award.

== Bibliography ==
Novels

- O. V. Vijayan (1969). Khasakkinte Itihasam (The Legends of Khasak). DC Books. ISBN 978-81-7130-126-3.
- O. V. Vijayan (1985). Dharmapuranam (The Saga of Dharmapuri). DC Books.
- O. V. Vijayan (1987). Gurusagaram (The Infinity of Grace). DC Books.
- O. V. Vijayan (1990). Madhuram Gayathi. DC Books. ASIN B007E5FFA4. Archived from the original on 31 January 2019.
- O. V. Vijayan (1993). Pravachakante Vazhi. DC Books. ISBN 978-81-7130-258-1.
- O. V. Vijayan (1997). Thalamurakal (Generations). DC Books. ISBN 978-81-7130-742-5.

Short stories

- O. V. Vijayan (1979). Oru Neenda Rathriyude Ormakkayi (kathakaḷ - Remembering a Long Night - stories). Sāhityapr̲avarttaka Sahakaraṇasaṅghaṃ : National Book Stall.
- O. V. Vijayan (2000). O. V. Vijayant̲e Kathakaḷ (Short Stories of Vijayan). DC Books. ISBN 978-81-264-0220-5.
- O. V. Vijayan (1985). Asanthi : Rathiyude Kathakal (Unrest: Stories of Lust). DC Books. ISBN 978-93-86560-54-4. Archived from the original on 1 February 2019.
- O. V. Vijayan (1985). Balabodhini: kathakaḷ. Sāhityapr̲avarttaka Sahakaraṇasaṅghaṃ : National Book Stall.
- O. V. Vijayan (1988). Kadaltheerathu. DC Books.
- O. V. Vijayan (1989). Kattu Paranja Katha (The Stories Told by the Wind). DC Books.
- O. V. Vijayan (1993). Poothaprabandhavum Mattu Kathakalum (Poothaprabandham and Other Stories). DC Books. ISBN 978-81-7130-279-6.
- O. V. Vijayan (1995). Kure Kathabeejangal (kathakaḷ - Stories). DC Books. ISBN 978-81-7130-546-9.
- O. V. Vijayan (2000). O. V. Vijayante Kathakal. DC Books. ISBN 978-81-264-0220-5.
- O.V. Vijayan (2007). Arakshithavastha (Insecurity). DC Books. ISBN 978-81-264-1471-0.
- O. V. Vijayan. Samudrathilekku Vazhithetti Vanna Paralmeen. DC Books. Archived from the original on 1 February 2019.

Collection of essays

- O. V. Vijayan (1987). Oru Sindoora Pottinte Orma. DC Books. Archived from the original on 1 February 2019.
- O. V. Vijayan (1988). Khoshayathrayil Thaniye (Alone in the Procession). DC Books. Archived from the original on 31 January 2019.
- O. V. Vijayan (1988). Vargasamaram Swathwam. DC Books. Archived from the original on 31 January 2019.
- O. V. Vijayan (1988). O. V. Vijayante Kurippukal (Notes). Current Books.
- O. V. Vijayan (1989). Ente Charithranewshana Pareekshakal (My Experiments with History). DC Books. ISBN 978-81-7130-081-5.
- O. V. Vijayan (1991). Sandehiyude Samvadam. Current Books. Archived from the original on 1 February 2019.
- O. V. Vijayan (1998). Haindhavanum Athuhaindhavanum. Current Books. Archived from the original on 1 February 2019.
- O. V. Vijayan (2001). Andhanum Akalangal Kaanunnavanum: (lekhanangaḷ - The Blind and The Seer - satirical essays). DC Books. ISBN 978-81-264-0299-1.
- O. V. Vijayan (2005). Vargasamaram, Swathwam. DC Books. Archived from the original on 31 January 2019.

Memoirs

- O. V. Vijayan (1989). Ithihasathinte Ithihasam. DC Books. ISBN 978-81-264-2877-9. Archived from the original on 1 February 2019.
- O. V. Vijayan (2002). Vijayan: A Cartoonist Remembers. Rupa & Company. ISBN 978-81-7167-883-9.
- O. V. Vijayan (2011). Vijayante Kathukal (Vijayan's Letters). DC Books. ISBN 978-81-264-3325-4. Archived from the original on 1 February 2019.

Cartoons

- O. V. Vijayan (1990). Ithiri Neramboke, Ithiri Darsanam (cartoons). DC Books. Archived from the original on 1 February 2019.
- Vijayan, O. V. (2006). Tragic idiom : O.V. Vijayan's cartoons & notes on India. Kottayam, Kerala: DC Books. ISBN 978-81-264-1235-8. OCLC 123377620.

Translations into English

- Vijayan, O. V. (1989). After the hanging and other stories. New Delhi, India: Penguin. ISBN 978-0-14-012617-4. OCLC 22731313.
- O. V. Vijayan (1988). The Saga of Dharmapuri. Penguin Group USA. ISBN 978-0-14-010787-6.
- Vijayan, O. V. (1994). The legends of Khasak. New Delhi: Penguin Books. ISBN 978-93-5118-009-8. OCLC 624323262.
- Vijayan, O. V. (1996). The infinity of grace. New Delhi: Penguin Books. ISBN 978-0-14-026007-6. OCLC 36470487.
- O. V. Vijayan (1999). Selected Fiction. Penguin. ISBN 978-0-14-028965-7.

Translations into French

- Vijayan, O. V. (2004). Les Légendes de Khasak. Translated by Vitalyos, Dominique. Fayard. ISBN 978-2-213-61994-1.
- O.V. Vijayan: L'Aéroport, transl. from Malayalam by Dominique Vitalyos, Revue Europe, nov-dec. 2002, pp. 236–241
- O.V. Vijayan: Les Rochers, translated from English by Valérie Blavignac, Revue Europe avril 2001, pp. 132–138.

Translations into Hindi

- O. V. Vijayan (1997). Samudra Thad Par. Translation of "Kadaltheerathu". Katha. ISBN 978-81-85586-55-7.

== Writings on Vijayan ==
- V.B. Vinod (2009). "Location of History in a Spiritual Eco-System: Looking at "Madhuram Gayati" by O V Vijayan". Indian Literature. 53 (2): 180–185. JSTOR 23348055.
- "The Creative World of Vijayan" (PDF). Shodhganga. 31 January 2019.
- Ormmapusthakam (Remembrances). DC Books. 2006. Archived from the original on 31 January 2019. "Memories of Vijayan, written by Anand, M. Mukundan, M. P. Narayana Pillai, Kakkanadan, Madhavikkutty, P. Govinda Pillai, Zacharia, N. S. Madhavan, V. K. N., T. J. S. George, E. P. Unni, O. V. Usha, Theresa Vijayan, Akavur Narayanan, and M. G. S."
