= Arohana Marthoma Church, Anicadu =

Church in Kerala, India

Coordinates: 9.4598°N 76.6717°E

Arohana Marthoma Church is a church situated in Anicadu Village, 5 km from Nedumkunnam and 4 km from Mallappally in Pathanamthitta district in the southern part of Kerala, India. It is a Malankara Mar Thoma Syrian Church under Kottayam- Kochi Dioceses. Arohana Marthoma Church has a total of about 176 families with more than 932 members.

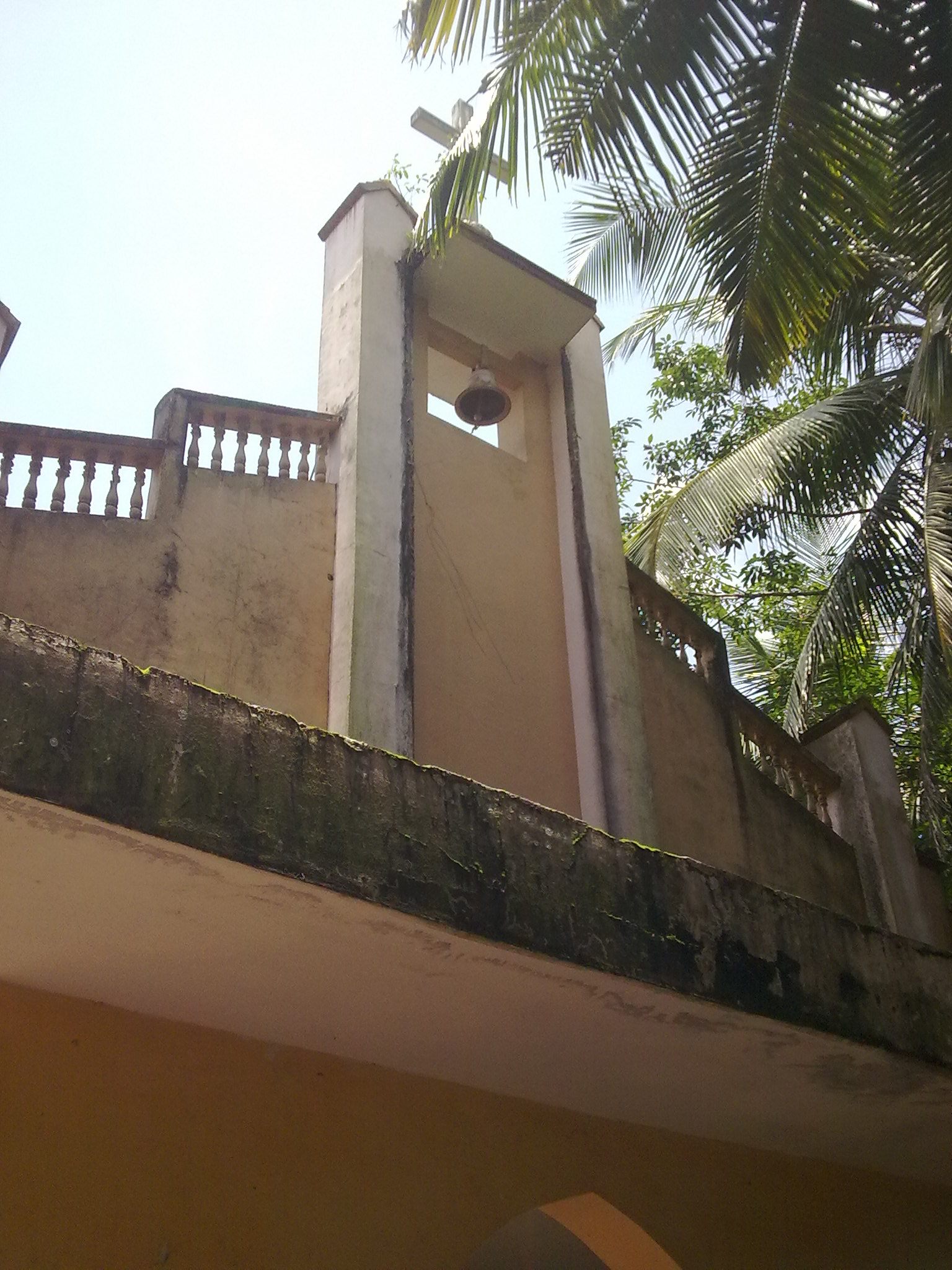
Arohana Marthoma Church, Anicadu

== History ==
It was founded in 1900. It is the first Mar Thoma church at this region. This church holds a unique position in the church history of the Syrian Christians of Malankara.

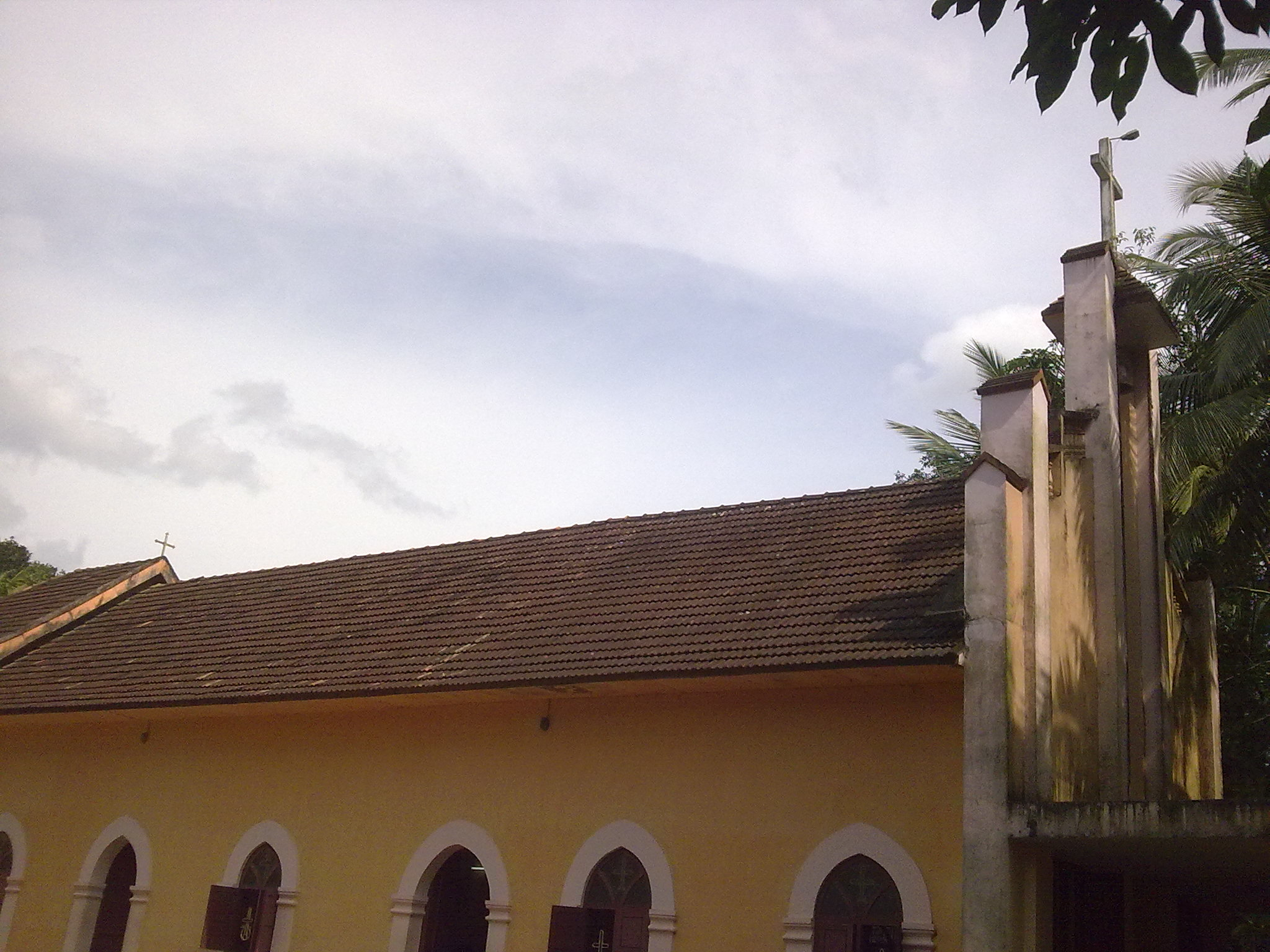
Arohana Marthoma Church

== Vicar ==
Rev. Thomas Easow is the vicar of Arohana Mar Thoma Church, Anicadu, since 1 May 2021.

== Vicars from Arohana MTC ==
- Rev. Achenkunju Mathew.
- Rev. Philip P George.
- Rev. K.V Cherian.
- Rev. V.M Mathew.
- Rev. John Mathew C.
- Rev. Tittu Thomas.

== Transport connections ==
Arohana Marthoma Church is reached through the towns of Mallappally and Karukachal by road. People who come from Southern Kerala go through Thiruvalla, Mallappally and Pullukuthy or Pathanamthitta, Mallappally and Pullukuthy. However the people coming from Northern Kerala go through Kottayam, Karukachal and Noorommave.

== Distance ==
- 18 km from Thiruvalla Railway station
- 18 km from Changanacherry Railway station
- 31 km from Kottayam Railway station
- 113 km from Cochin International Airport, Nedumbassery

== Church organizations ==
The parish organizations or ministries are:

- Edavaka Mission
- Sunday School
- Arohana Marthoma Yuvajana Sakhyam (youth organisation)
- Choir
- Sevika Sanghom
- MAS
