= V. K. N. =

Indian writer

V.K.N.
- Born: 7 April 1929; Thiruvilwamala, Trichur, Kingdom of Cochin
- Died: 25 January 2004 (aged 74); Thiruvilwamala, Trichur, Kerala, India
- Occupations: Writer, journalist
- Spouse: Vedavathi
- Children: Balachandran, Ranjana
- Writing career
- Language: Malayalam
- Genres: Novel, short story, humour, essay, screenplay (Appunni).
- Notable works: Arohanam, Payyan Kathakal

Vadakkke Koottala Narayanankutty Nair, known professionally as VKN, (7 April 1929 – 25 January 2004), was a prominent Malayalam writer, noted mainly for his highbrow satire. He wrote novels, short stories and political commentaries. His works are noted for their multi-layered humour, trenchant criticism of the socio-political classes and ability to twist the meanings of words contextually and lend a touch of magic to his language.

== Biography ==
A native of Kerala in south India, V. K. Narayanankutty Nair was born on 7 April 1929 in Thiruvilwamala in Trichur district (now Thrissur)

After completing his matriculation, he joined the Malabar Devaswom Board and worked there for nine years. VKN's first story Parajithan was published in the October 1953 issue of Mathrubhumi Weekly. Like his contemporary Malayalam writers such as O. V. Vijayan, VKN spent many years in New Delhi (from 1959 to 1969) as an English journalist.

== Personal life ==
He was married to Vedavathi Amma. They had a son Balachandran & a daughter Ranjana.

== Literary life ==
VKN entered the Malayalam literary scene in the 1950s. Although he initially pursued poetry, he later turned his attention to other forms of writing while retaining a lifelong interest in verse. He was noted for his wide-ranging knowledge of both classical and contemporary literature and was equally familiar with traditional works and modern poetry. His intellectual interests extended beyond literature to subjects such as politics, history, philosophy, economics, science, and religion. Drawing on this broad range of references, he incorporated diverse ideas and themes into his stories and novels.

V. K. N. gained wider recognition as a writer during the 1960s. By that time, he had relocated to New Delhi, where he worked as a journalist for approximately a decade. During this period, New Delhi became an important centre for a number of emerging Malayalam writers who were living and working in the city. Among them were O. V. Vijayan, M. Mukundan, George Varghese Kakkanadan, M. P. Narayana Pillai. These writers, as well as VKN, who had reached New Delhi for professional reasons, met regularly to discuss literature, politics, and other subjects of mutual interest.

VKN's social and political outlook was shaped in part by his years in Delhi, where he observed the workings of political institutions and public life. These experiences later provided material for much of his satirical writing, which often addressed themes such as political power, bureaucracy, and corruption through humour and irony. As a result, he became widely known for his distinctive style of satire and was frequently described as a humorist. He characterized his novels Pennpada, Manchal, and Pithamahan as "historical satires," a term he used to describe their blend of historical settings and social commentary.

VKN's important works are Pithamahan (The Great Grandfather), Arohanam (which literally means "The Ascend" but "Bovine Bugles" in the author's own translation), Adhikaram (The Power), Payyan Kathakal (The Stories of Payyan), Sir Chathuleecock, Kavi (The Saffron), Chathans, and Chitrakeralam (Kerala Pictures).

VKN frequently used humour: irony, satire, parody and burlesque in his works. He often addressed issues like corruption, violence against women, libertinism and poverty with a 'keen-eyed scrutiny'. His work is also considered as a resistance to authoritarianism of all sorts.

== Death ==
He died on 25 January 2004 at his residence in Thiruvilwamala. He was 74. He was ailing for some time. The last rites were performed at Pambadi on the banks of the Bharathappuzha.

== Works ==
=== Novels ===
- Arohanam (VKN himself translated this work into English with the title Bovine Bugles)
- Pithamahan
- Adhikaram
- Anantharam
- Asuravani
- Penpada
- Kaavi
- General Chathans
- Manchal
- Syndicate
- Orazhcha

=== Collections of short stories ===
- Payyan Kathakal
- Sir Chathuvinte Ruling
- Hajyaru
- Mananchira Test
- VKN Kathakal
- Ambathu Kathakal
- Oru Nooru Mini Kathakal
- Ayyaayiravum Kooppum
- Naanuaru
- Payyan
- Kaalaghattathile Payyan
- Mandahasam
- Cleopatra
- Payyante Samaram
- Payyante Rajavu
- Mangalapuram Pootham
- Kozhi
- prathal

== Awards ==
- 1969: Kerala Sahitya Akademi Award – Arohanam
- 1978: M. P. Paul Award – overall contributions for Malayalam literature
- 1982: Kendra Sahitya Akademi Award – Payyan Kathakal
- 1987: Religious Harmony Award (instituted by the Organisation of Understanding and Fraternity, New Delhi
- 1997: Muttathu Varkey Award – Pitamahan
