= P. A. Uthaman =

Malayalam writer and novelist

- Born: 2 October 1961; Nedumangad, Thiruvananthapuram district
- Died: 10 June 2008 (aged 46)
- Occupation: Writer
- Writing career
- Genres: Novel, short story
- Notable work: Chavoli
- Notable awards: Kerala Sahitya Akademi Award

P. A. Uthaman was a Malayalam writer and novelist. Known for his work Purushethaman The first novel 'Chaoli' and received the Kerala Sahitya Akademi Award.

== Early life ==
He was born on 2 October 1961 at Nedumangad in Thiruvananthapuram district . Uthaman received the Best Novel Award from the Kerala Sahitya Akademi for his work 'Chavoli', which was published shortly before his death in June 2008. This award was a belated recognition for his portrayal of the marginalized Dalit community, the Kuravas, in the rural setting of Nedumangad.

== Works ==
- Chavoli

== Award ==
- Kerala Sahitya Akademi Award for Novel in 2008.

== Death ==
Uthaman died due to lung cancer at 45, he was working at Travancore Sugar and Chemicals in Tiruvall.
