= Kattoor, Thrissur =

Kattoor Kattur
- Town
- Location in Kerala, India Kattoor (India)
- Coordinates: 10°22′0″N 76°9′0″E
- Country: India
- State: Kerala
- District: Thrissur

Government
  - Body: Katoor Grama Panchayath, Chazhur Grama Panchayath, Thanniyam Grama Panchayath, Edathiruthy Grama Panchayath, Karalam Grama Panchayath

Population (2001)
  - Total: 17,574

Languages
  - Official: Malayalam, English
- Time zone: UTC+5:30 (IST)
- PIN: 680702
- Telephone code: 0480
- Vehicle registration: KL-45
- Nearest city: Irinjalakuda
- Literacy: 100%
- Website: www.kattoor.com

Kattoor is a small village in Irinjalakuda Block of Thrissur district, Kerala, India.

== History ==
=== Prehistoric period ===
During the period between 1500 AD and 1600 AD, after the arrival of Portuguese due to their special interest, this area has been made a trade center. Hence Kattoor and near by places had developed a lot. Different kinds of trade have been developed on the banks of Kanoli Canal in Kattoor and Edathuruthy, (the eastern part of Malabar). Kattoor and Edathuruthy bazaar - known as 'Chantha' and 'Angady'- was famous for trading, and it remains a major marketplace for residents of Kattoor even today.

In the pre-history period of Kattor there were lesser proximity of conveyance by road and transportable public roads are very rare in Kattoor like other places. Transportation was mainly made through water boat service. Kodungalloor, Kochi etc. were the main trade centers connecting with Kattoor by this water ways. The main cause of the development of these places were the trade introduced by the Portuguese.

=== Present ===
The Kattoor grama panchayath established in the year 1952 AD. After starting freedom struggle a few patriots have marked their name in that movement. In other way we can say they have rendered sincere contribution by participating in the freedom struggle.

History of kattoor Panchayath The area of Kattor panchayath was 25 square km at the very beginning of its formation. This Panchayath has been covered by Kattoor, Karalam village and a part of Manavalassery village. During the year 1977 AD, this panchayath has been divided and a new panchayath has been formed in the name of Karalam Grama panchayth.

Border of Panchayth The border of the present Kattoor grama Panchayath are as follows.

- North river Karuvannoor,
- East Karalam Grama Panchayath,
- South-Padiyoor grama Panchayath,
- West Kanoli canal
- Area of the panchayath is 11.70 km^{2}. Population is about 17,000. Density of the population 1445 per km^{2}.

At the very beginning of Kattoor Grama Panchayath, office and related offices were functioning at Ponjanam, one km east of Kattoor School junction, in a rented building. Syro Malabar Catholic church authorities had donated the land to the authorities concerned to build its own building for panchayath. Before independence of India, Government of Kochi has constructed this panchayath building in the year 1937 in the land given by Syro Malabar Catholic church.

If we are trying to penetrate to the yesterdays of Kattoor the history goes to old Kochi. The western border of Kattoor is Conolly Canal the other side of the canal is old Malabar. The cultural and religious life style of old Kochi and old Malabar have influenced the life style of the people of Katoor.

The people of Kattoor and the surrounding places depends on agriculture and trade to meet their daily bread. A good number of people depends upon different kinds of works of related cultivation and trade of these places.

How the name 'KATTOOR' originated? From the ancient period onwards their place was known as Kattoor. It is believed the reason for originating the name as Kattoor the surrounding places Vetha Kad, Chekkad, Pudukkad, Thazekkad, Mannookad, Karakkad, Illikad etc. were influenced to call their places as Kattoor in Malayalam."Kad or Kat" is having a meaning of forest and nad" is meant for the apt place for living with civilized circumstances. Though this place is known as Kattoor means the 'oor' of a 'Kad'. In Malayalam 'Oor' means 'Nad' in an elaborated form 'nad 'of a 'Kad'. Though the name meant such.

== Geography ==
It is located at .

== Demographics ==
As of 2001 India census, Kattoor had a population of 17574 with 8003 males and 9571 females.

== Kattoor Angady ==
The Kattoor "Angady", well known for the early morning market, is situated in the banks of Kanoli Canal, which form most of the west boundary of Kattoor. Kattoor Angady has a "Chantha" (Commodity Exchange). It was famous due to its historical unique position. It is near to Kanoli Canal, it was close to old state borders and it has proximity to Arabian Sea.

Kattoor side of Kanoli Canal was a part of Travancore Cochin and the other side, Edamuttam side, was a part of Malabar District which was an administrative district of British India. During the period of British empire, Kanoli Canal connected the north end to the south end of the State. Main propose of Kanoli Canal was transportation of goods. This canal is also connected to Arabian Sea. Old days, for a trading boat comes from Arabian Sea through Kanoli Canal, Kattoor was the nearest main market place. Due to these reasons Kattor "Chantha" was popular for exotic commodities coming from afar. Merchants and farmers from nearby villages used to come to Kattoor "Chantha" to buy and sell goods and produces.

== Schools ==
- Pompei St. Mary's VHSE School
- Government Higher Secondary School
- St.Xaviers High School, Karanchira
- St.Joseph Upper Primary School
- St. Georges Convent UP School.
- Albab central school (CBSE syllabus)
- Vimala Central School (CBSE syllabus)
- St:Dominic CBSE School (CBSE syllabus)

== Hospitals ==
- Government Hospital, Kattoor
- Unity Hospital
- Bishop Alappat Mission Hospital, Karanchira
- Government Ayurveda Dispensary

== Nearest Towns ==
- Thrissur - 20KM
- Irinjalakuda - 10KM
- Thriprayar - 10KM
- Edamuttam - 7KM
