= İskender Pala =

Turkish author,Poetry Professor and author of best seller novels (born 1958)

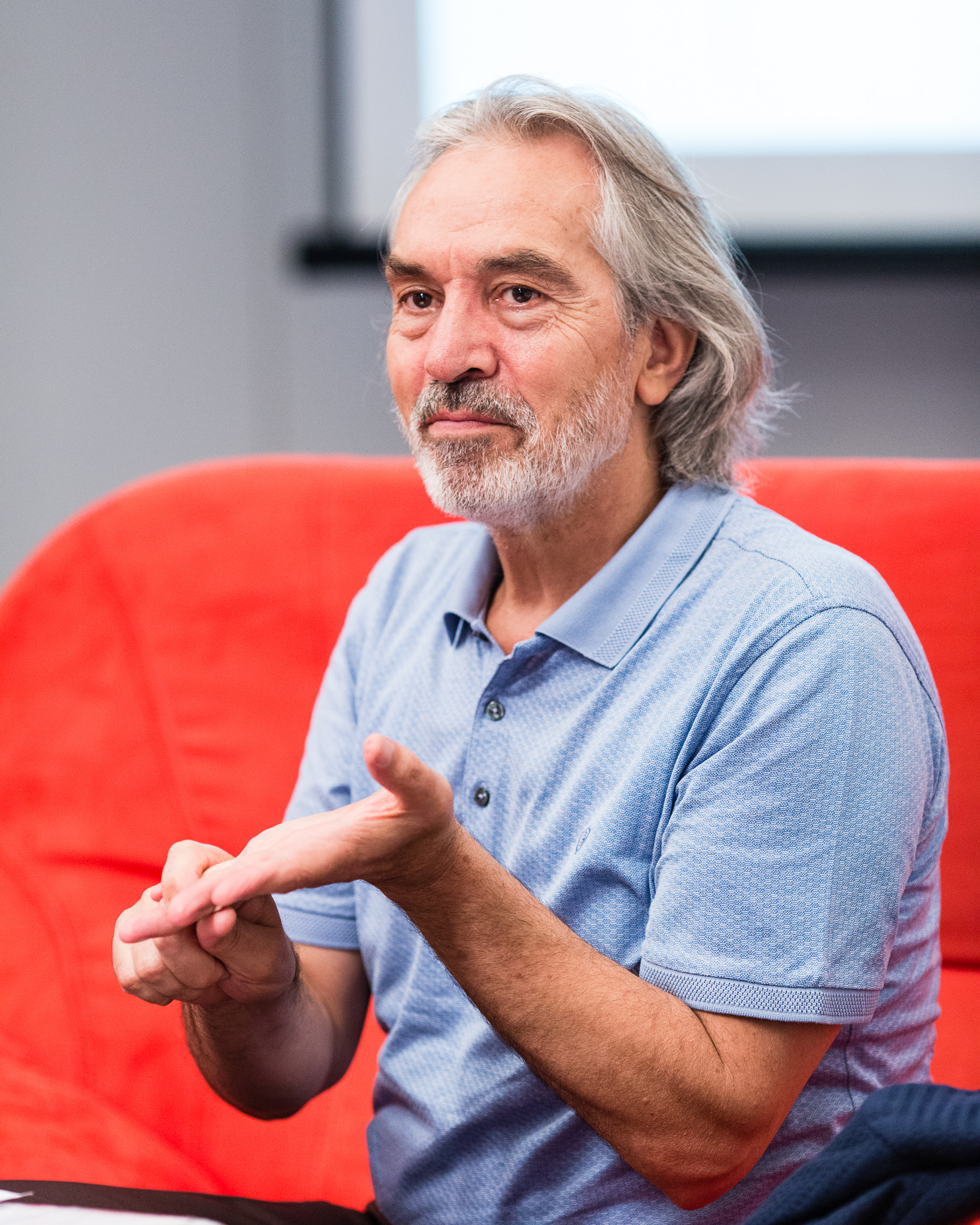
- Prof. Dr. İskender Pala (2018)
- Born: İskender Pala; June 8, 1958 (age 68); Uşak, Turkey
- Education: Istanbul University; Istanbul Kültür University; Uşak University
- Occupations: Novelist, writer
- Writing career
- Period: 1987–present
- Genres: Historical; Reference; Historical Romance
- Website: www.iskenderpala.net/en/

İskender Pala (born 1958, in Turkey) is a Turkish Divan (Ottoman) Poetry Professor and author of best seller novels. He also used to write a column in the Turkish daily newspaper Zaman.

İskender Pala graduated from Istanbul University Faculty of Letters Turkish Language and Literature Department in 1979. He entered Turkish Navy as a lieutenant in 1982 and taught Turkish Literature in Naval Schools and Boğaziçi University. In 1987 he established Turkish Navy Museum Archives. He oversaw classification and restoration of many historic documents dated from the times of the Ottoman Empire. He published Encyclopedic Dictionary of Divan (Ottoman) Poetry and received Writers Union of Turkey Award in 1989. He was discharged from the Navy without any conviction during what is now called the "Postmodern coup". Later, he wrote a book about his life in Navy and his discharge, called Between Two Coups referring to military coup in 1980 and 1997 military memorandum in Turkey. He said that the reason for his discharge was his practicing İslam in his private life.

== Early life and education ==
İskender Pala was born in Uşak, Turkey, on June 8, 1958. He went to Cumhuriyet primary school in Uşak and Kütahya high school in Kütahya. He worked as construction worker in summers in order to save money for his education. In 1975 he was accepted to İstanbul University Faculty of Letters Turkish Language and Literature Department and graduated in 1979.

== Career ==
After graduation he was working in the department's seminary library as a clerk and waiting for an open teaching assistantship position. It was just before the 1980 Turkish coup d'état. Ideological differences and unsolved murders were at a peak. He got married after the coup. However, his clerk salary and part-time teaching job at a high school were not enough to get by. He applied for Navy's advertisement about hiring a literature teacher as an officer in the newspaper. In December, 1980 he entered an examination and an interview. While waiting for the results he won teaching assistantship examination at the university in spring of 1981. However, the hiring process was interrupted and results of the examination were cancelled. While he was waiting for a new examination date, he was accepted to the Navy. He was in dilemma and eventually decided against joining the Navy. In 1981 the university did not repeat the selection examination but he financially was in a difficult position. Luckily, the Navy put an advertisement about hiring a literature teacher as an officer in the newspaper again in 1981. He repeated the process and entered the Navy on May 27, 1982, as an ensign.

His first assignment was to Turkish Naval High School in Istanbul. In 1983, he completed his Litt. D. in Classic Turkish Litreture at Istanbul University Vocational School of Social Sciences. As a result of his academic advancement he was promoted to Lieutenant Junior Grade in August 1984.

== Marriage and family ==
İskender Pala married F. Hülya Pala on September 23, 1980. They have two daughters; Hilye Banu (b. 1982), Elif Dilasa (b. 1986) and a son; Alperen Ahmet (b. 1992). In the introduction section of every novel he thanks his wife for being his life partner, first reader and first critic. Hülya Pala said in an interview that she is not as romantic as her husband and her views are deterministic and rigid. She also quoted Al-Farabi's poem "If boy would not fall in love, girl is not worthy of love".

== Works ==
- Efsane (Legend) – A "Barbaros" Novel (2013)
- OD (Flame) – A Yunus Novel (2011)
- Şah ve Sultan (Shah and Sultan) (2010)
- İki darbe Arasında – İlginç Zamanlarda (Between Two Coups – Interesting Times) (2010)
- Katre-i Matem (Grief Drop) (2010)
- Encyclopedic Dictionary of Divan (Ottoman) Poetry (1989)
- Tulip of Istanbul (2021)- Niyogi Books
