= Arohanam (novel) =

1969 novel by V. K. N.

Arohanam (Bovine Bugles)
- Author: V. K. N.
- Translator: V. K. N.
- Illustrator: Artist Namboothiri
- Cover artist: N. Ajayan
- Language: Malayalam
- Genre: Novel
- Publisher: DC Books
- Publication date: 1969
- Publication place: India
- Pages: 167
- Awards: Kerala Sahitya Akademi Award

Arohanam (meaning, Ascent) is a Malayalam-language political satire novel written by V. K. N. in 1969. V. K. N. himself translated the novel into English under the title Bovine Bugles. The author follows his trademark style in this novel which mercilessly attacks the Indian politics of the 1960s. The novel won the Kerala Sahitya Akademi Award in 1970.
