= K. Surendran =

Indian novelist

K.Surendran
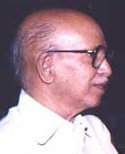
- Born: 22 February 1921; Kerala
- Died: 9 August 1997 (aged 76)
- Occupation: Novelist
- Writing career
- Genres: Novel, Short Story

K. Surendran (22 February 1921 – 9 August 1997) was an Indian novelist who wrote in Malayalam. He won the Kerala Sahitya Akademi Award in 1963 for the novel Maya and the Vayalar Award in 1994 for the novel Guru.

== Biography ==
Surendran was born on 22 February 1921 in Ochira in Kollam district of Kerala state. He served in the Department of Post & Telegraph; and in 1965 he resigned his job to become a full-time writer. He authored many books in Malayalam, including ten novels, four plays, and several miscellaneous books. He won the Kerala Sahitya Akademi Award in 1963 for the novel Maya and the Vayalar Award in 1994 for the novel Guru. In 1997 he was conferred with the Sahitya Academy Fellowship. Surendran died on 9 August 1997.

== Selected works ==
Novels

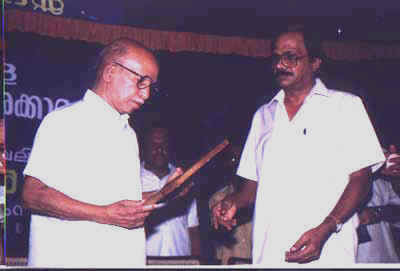
K. Surendran hands over the fellowship certificate awarded by Kerala Sahitya Akademi to M. T. Vasudevan Nair

- Maya
- Thalam
- Jwala
- Kattukurangu
- Shakthi
- Bhikshamdehi
- Maranam Durbalam
- Kshanaprabhachanchalam
- Aruna
- Seetayanam
- Pataka
- Guru

Plays

- Bali
- Arakkillam
- Palunku pathram
- Anaswaramanushyan

Others

- Manushyavastha
- Kumaruvinte Balyam
- NovelSwaroopam
- Surendrante Prabandhangal
- Kumaran Asan
- Tolstoyiyude Kadha
- Dostoyevskyiyude Kadha
- Kalayum Samanyajanangalum
- Jeevitavum Njanum
