= Khasakkinte Itihasam =

1968 novel by O. V. Vijayan

- Cover of the French (2004) translation by Dominique Vitalyos (Fayard)
- Author: O. V. Vijayan
- Language: Malayalam
- Genre: Novel (Magic realism)
- Published: 1968 (Mathrubhumi Weekly); 1969–1990 (Current Books); 1990 onwards (D.C. Books); 1994 English version (Penguin Books)
- Publisher: DC Books (Malayalam); Penguin Books (English version)
- Publication place: India
- Awards: Muttathu Varkey Award (1992)
- ISBN: 978-8171301263

Khasakkinte Itihasam (transl. The Legend of Khasak, generally referred to as Khasak in Malayalam literary circles) is the Malayalam debut novel by Indian writer O. V. Vijayan (1930–2005). It was first serialised in 1968 and published as a single edition in 1969. The novel has been translated from Malayalam into French by Dominique Vitalyos.

The novel tells the story of a young university student, who leaves a promising future to take up a primary school teacher's job in the remote village of Khasak. Little by little, the village reveals its secrets. The protagonist is soon bewitched by this ancient village where dreams and legends intermingle. He immerses himself in the "bewitching sensuousness" of the new "rustic, amoral world", only to emerge as an "involved outsider". He finds rational inquiry meaningless and begins a metaphorical journey inwards. The novel is often associated with the general disillusionment with the communist movement in Kerala in the 1960s.

The novel is characterized by the matter-of-fact inclusion of mythical elements into seemingly realistic fiction (magic realism). The novel, published in 1969, after more than a decade of drafting and re-drafting, became an instant hit with young people in Kerala. The multi-faceted work is still one of the bestsellers in Malayalam. It has had over 50 reprints, making it one of the most widely read Malayalam novels.

The novel was "translated" into English by Vijayan in 1994 (under the title The Legends of Khasak, Penguin Books), but this version differs substantially from the Malayalam original. Most Kerala readers prefer to read this as an independent novel rather than seeing it as a translation. The English version has also been translated into German by Ursula Gräfe.

== Background ==
Khasakkinte Itihasam was inspired by the Ottupulackal family's stay at a village called Thasarak near Palakkad (in central Kerala) for a year. O. V. Vijayan's sister was appointed as the teacher of a single-teacher government school in the village (1956). Some of the characters in the novel were modeled after real-life characters whom Vijayan encountered in Thasarak.

In an afterword to the English version of the novel Vijayan wrote:

"It had all begun this way: in 1956 my sister got a teaching assignment in the village of Thasarak. This was part of a [Kerala] State scheme to send barefoot graduates to man single-teacher schools in backward villages.

"Since it was hard for a girl [woman] to be on her own in a remote village, my parents had rented a little farmhouse and moved in with my sister. Meanwhile, I had been sacked from the college where I taught. Jobless and at a loose end, I too joined them in Thasarak to drown my sorrows...Destiny had been readying me for Khasak."

— O. V. Vijayan, An Afterword, The Legends of Khasak (Penguin)

Origin in Thasarak	Dramatis Personae
Thasarak	Khasak
Allappicha Mollakka	Allappicha Mollakka
the Khazi (later imam of a mosque in Palghat)	Nizam Ali "Khaliyar"
Syed Sheik Hassan Mastan	Sheik Syed Miyan, the Thangal

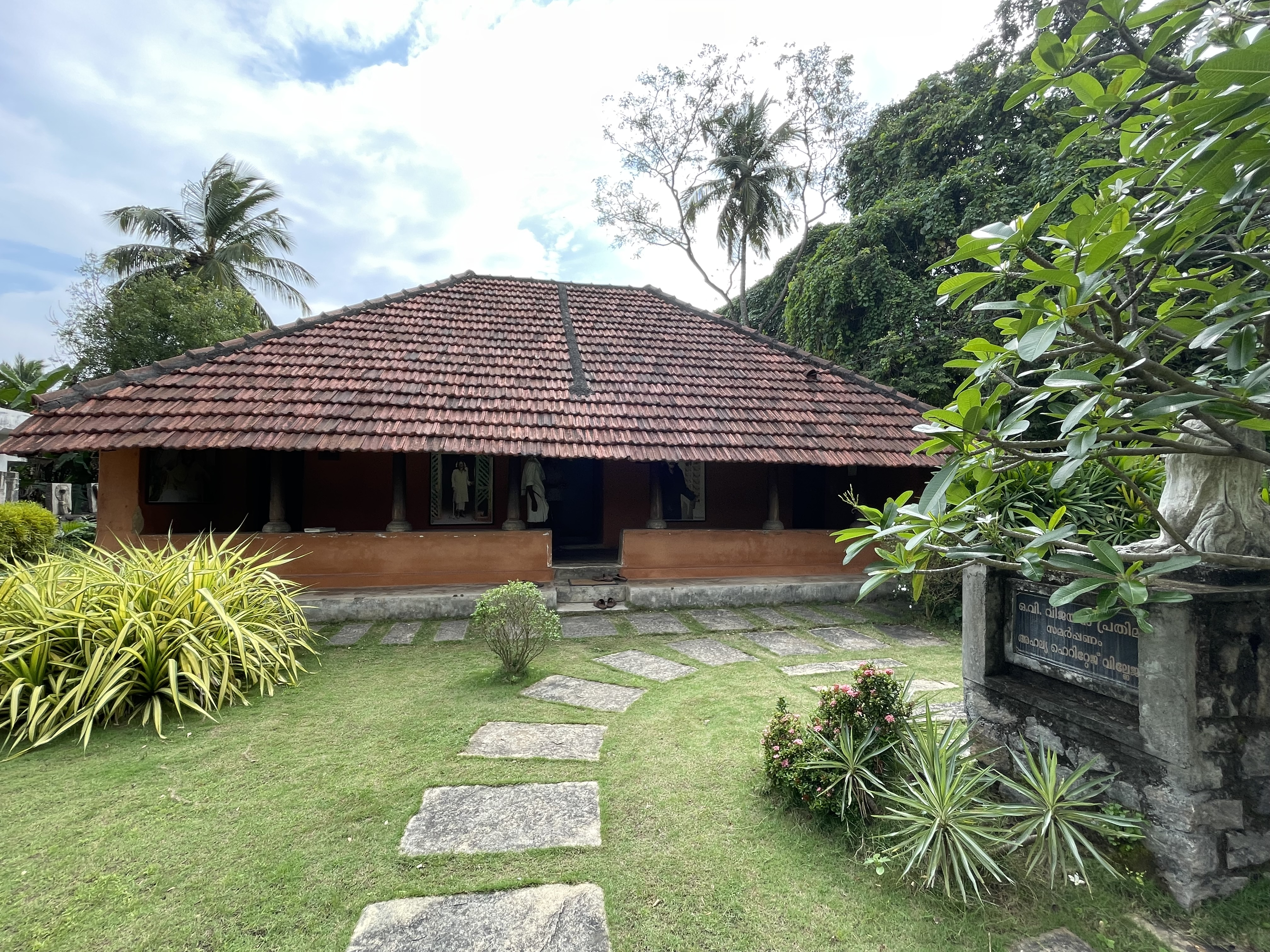
The njattupura in the compound of O. V. Vijayan Memorial at Thasarak, Palakkad

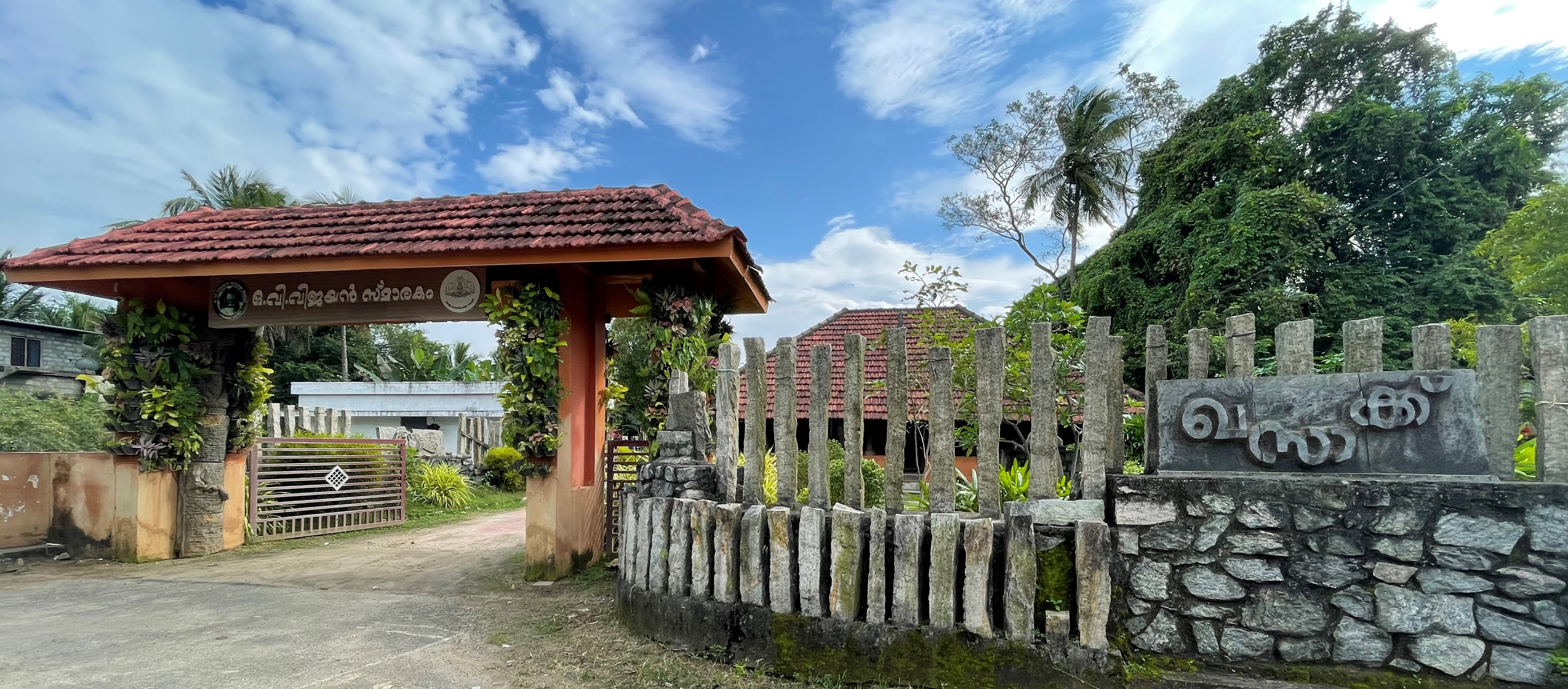
O. V. Vijayan Memorial by Kerala Government at Thasarak, Palakkad

The njattupura where protagonist Ravi ran the school was modeled on a real-life njattupura. This njattupura was a 'temporary shelter' for O. V. Vijayan during the late 1950s and 1960s. Arabikkulam, a pond that finds mention in the novel, is also located in Thasarak. An O. V. Vijayan memorial is present at Thasrak in Palakkad.

Vijayan took twelve years (begun in 1956) to complete Khasakkinte Itihasam. The character Appukkili was originally created by Vijayan for his short story "Appukkili" - a chapter in the finished book - which was published in October 1958 (Mathrubhumi Weekly).

== Synopsis ==
The protagonist, Ravi, a Malayali final year under-graduate student in Madras, is haunted by the guilt of an affair he had with his stepmother. He thus abandons the prospects of a bright academic career, deserts his girlfriend Padma and leaves on a long journey, which finally brings him to the remote (fictional) village of Khasak near Palakkad (central Kerala). At Khasak, he works in a single-teacher government primary school as part of the Malabar District Board's education initiative.

The story commences with Ravi's arrival at Khasak and the beginning of his encounters with its people and legends. He immerses himself in the 'bewitching sensuousness of the rustic, amoral world', only to emerge as an 'involved outsider'. He finds rational inquiry meaningless and begins a metaphorical journey inwards. The narrative strategy of the novel is characterized by the matter-of-fact inclusion of fantastic or mythical elements into seemingly realistic fiction. The narration also makes sense of multiple separate realities (see magic realism).

At the end of a series of events, including the threat of suspension from the authorities, Ravi keeps his word to his ex-girlfriend Padma to leave Khasak. The novel ends with Ravi in the monsoon rain, waiting for his bus to leave the village, watching a snake that had struck him withdrawing into its hole.

=== Magic realism ===
[O. V.] Vijayan happened in Malayalam much before Gabriel Garcia Marquez and Jose Saramago had become daily bread for the reader in Malayalam. It is ironic that the 'translation' of Khasakkinte Itihasam (The Legend of Khasak) in English happened much later and those who knew him through the English version identified his unique narrative mode with the magic realism of the Latin American masters.

— K. Satchidanandan, A Sage and an Iconoclast, Frontline

== Characters ==
- Ravi - the new school teacher in Khasak (Palakkad), originally from Pattambi.
- Ravi's father - a doctor in a coffee plantation in Ooty.
- Padma - Ravi's ex-girlfriend from Madras Christian College, Madras
- Suma and Rama - half-sisters of Ravi
- Bodhananda Swami - a holy man managing an ashrama
- Kelu Menon - the post-man to Khasak

=== Khasak ===
- Madhavan Nair - a tailor by profession, Ravi's mate in the village.
- Allappicha Mollakka - the village primary madrasa teacher and the mosque mukri
- Nizam Ali "Khaliyar" - the young mystic/healer (khaliyar) in the village, lives in an abandoned mosque (the King's Mosque)
- Maimuna - daughter of Allappicha Mollakka, married to Chukra Rawthar.
- Thevarathu Shivaraman Nair - a landlord in Khasak
- Kuppu Achan - the toddy-tapper/pub owner in Khasak
- Kuttadan Pushari - the priest/oracle of goddess Nallamma
- Aliyar - the village restaurant owner
- Syed Miyan Sheik Thangal - the founder of the Rawthar community in Khasak.
- Pulinkompile Pothi - a spirit, village goddess living on a tree
- Nallamma - the goddess of smallpox
- Thithibi Umma - Allappicha Mollakka's first wife
- Chukra Rawthar "Mungankozhi" - husband of Maimuna
- Malikakkal Attar - owner of a cigarette factory in Kumankavu
- Zohrabi - Malikakkal Attar's wife
- Narayani Amma - Sivaraman Nair's wife
- Kelan Master - manages a primary school in Kumankavu
- Gopalu Panikkar - the traditional village teacher, later a healer
- Lakshmi – wife of Gopalu Panikkar
- Ramachar – cattle broker, the apprentice of Gopalu Panicker
- Abida - daughter of Chukra Rawthar from his first marriage
- Neeli - mother of Appukkili
- Nachi, Kochi and Kali - sisters of Neeli
- Kuttappu Nari - husband of Kali
- Chanthumma - daughter of the wandering mystic Thangal Pakkiri, a widow
- Kunhu-Noor and Chanthumuthu - Chanthumma's children
- Kalyani - wife of Kuppu Achan
- Kesi – daughter-in-law of Kuppu Achan
- Mayandi - the village bootlegger/pub owner
- Cholayumma – mother of Kunha-Amina
- Ossan Annan – the Muslim barber (the ossan)

One-Teacher School students

- Kunn-Amina
- Karuvu
- Unipparadi
- Kochu-Zohara
- Kholusu
- Alam Khan
- Vavar
- Nurjihan
- Unipparathi
- Kinnari

== Publication history ==
- The novel was serialised in Mathrubhumi Weekly in 28 parts, between 28 January 1968 and 4 August 1968.
- It was published in a single edition (Malayalam) by Current Books in 1969.
- The first DC Books edition (Malayalam) was published in 1990.
- The English version was published in 1994 (Penguin Books).

The novel (Malayalam) has been reprinted more than fifty times.

== Reception ==
O.V. Vijayan rose to prominence in Kerala with his first novel Khasakkinte Itihasam. The novel became an instant hit with the young Kerala people. Such was the influence of the novel on the people of Kerala that the whole of modern Malayalam fiction came to be defined in terms of a ‘before’ and an ‘after’ in relation to it.

At the time of publishing, the novel 'infuriated' some of the Kerala conservatives and the progressives alike (for different reasons). It was criticised by both for its depiction of 'sexual anarchy'. Orthodox readers charged it with 'obscurity', 'partly because of its new idiom and partly its play with space and time' (which contrasted with the familiar, chronological narration).

"This novel literally revolutionised Malayalam fiction.

"Its interweaving of myth and reality, its lyrical intensity, its black humour, its freshness of idiom with its mixing of the provincial and the profound and its combinatorial wordplay, its juxtaposition of the erotic and the metaphysical, the crass and the sublime, the real and the surreal, guilt and expiation, physical desire and existential angst, and its innovative narrative strategy with its deft manipulation of time and space together created a new readership with a novel sensibility and transformed the Malayali imagination forever."

— K. Satchidanandan, Frontline

"The invasion of Hungary was very traumatic for me. I had been such a communist that I was upset about Beria being shot. At the same time I was going through some internal disturbances and became sensitive to religion"

"They thought I was a Maoist... But I was shedding ideology"

"Life has two terminals: life and death. A political party can analyse what goes on between the two historically and scientifically. But what lies beyond has to be indeterminate. That is why literature has to be free."

"I believe in the emergence of a messiah. The inevitability of the prophet is more than the inevitability of the class struggle."

— O. V. Vijayan, India Today

"He [O. V. Vijayan] symbolises the disillusionment with the [Kerala] communist movement in the '60s. The youth used to turn to the communists to solve all problems. But then Vijayan came and demystified communism."

— M. Mukundan, India Today

"It might be the author's truthful "self-dissent" during the course of the writing that made Khasak, which otherwise would have ended up as a mundane village romance, a seminal work that addressed some of the deeper issues of an enlightened individual's personal and social existence in the post-independence period. Everything in this novel — the theme, the characters, the language, the style, the narration, the way myth and reality, realism and fantasy mix — was ingenious and unprecedented in Malayalam."

— T. P. Rajeevan, The Hindu

"[O. V.] Vijayan's most potent weapon against the gods that failed is his masterly prose. It came like a whirlwind to the arid literary landscape that Kerala had become - a wasteland in which only pulp and porn blossomed. Socialist realism demanded a formalism and often led to the exile of the imagination.

"Today, [O. V.] Vijayan is viewed as the greatest living writer in Malayalam, with an amazing, almost magical, grip on the Malayalee ethos and language."

— Madhu Jain, India Today,

== English version ==
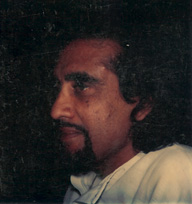
O. V. Vijayan (1930–2005)

O. V. Vijayan published his English version of Khasakkinte Itihasam in 1994 (under the title 'The Legends of Khasak'). The English version has had a pan-Indian appeal. This version differs substantially from the Malayalam original in its sensibility. Most readers prefer to read this as an independent novel by Vijayan rather than seeing it as a translation. Authors like N. S. Madhavan have been openly critical of the 'freedoms Vijayan took with his own work' as well as his English style.

The English version was published long after Vijayan experienced an 'epistemological break' after meeting the monk Swami Karunakara Guru. The early O. V. Vijayan was marked by 'deep philosophical doubt and skepticism', but the later O. V. Vijayan 'upheld certitudes'. The Legends of Khasak was written by 'the Vijayan of certitudes', which makes it a very different novel in its sensibility, in spite of being a 'translation'.

One critic makes the following comparison between Khasakkinte Itihasam and The Legends of Khasak to prove this point. A literal translation of an important passage in Khasakkinte Itihasam reads:

"What is his truth?" They asked one another.
They recalled the curse that the mollakka had sought to cast on Nizam Ali. It had no effect on him.
"The khazi's truth," they said, "is the sheikh's truth."
"What then of the mollakka's? Is he untrue?" They asked again.
"He too is the truth."
"How can that be so?"
"Because truths are many."

In The Legends of Khasak, O. V. Vijayan rendered this passage thus:

"What is the Khazi's truth?" The troubled elders asked one another.
They recalled the spell the mullah had tried to cast on Nizam Ali. They had seen the spell fail.
"The Khazi's truth," they told themselves, "is the Sheikh's truth."
"If that be so," the troubled minds were in search of certitude, "is Mollakka the untruth?"
"He is the truth too."
"How is it so?"
"Many truths make the big truth."

=== Theatrical adaptation ===
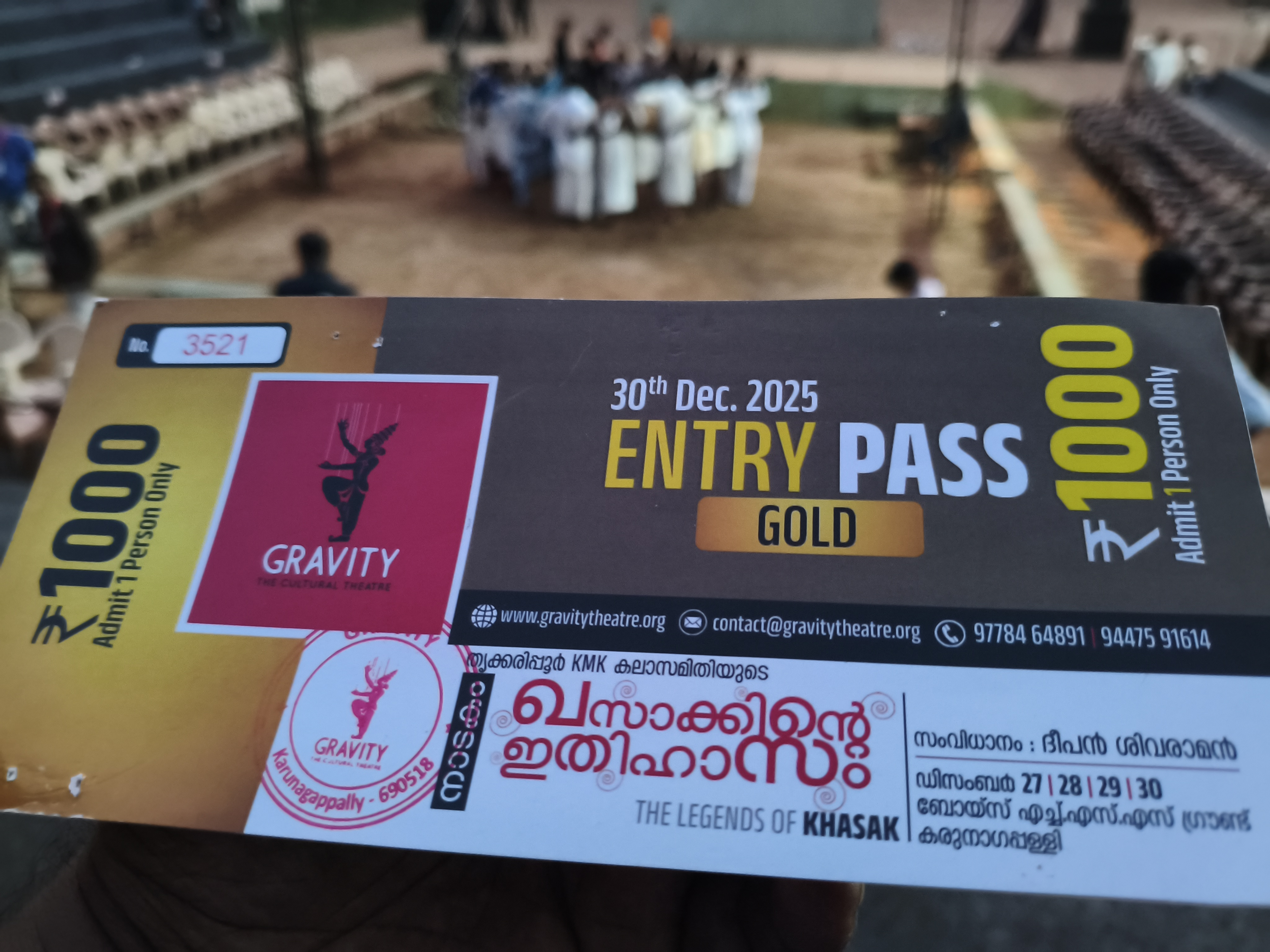
An entry pass for a theatrical adaptation of the novel Khasakkinte Itihasam.

The novel has been adapted for the stage, with the same name. The play is directed by Deepan Sivaraman on behalf of KMK Smaraka Kalasamithi, Trikaripur and has had performances across Kerala.
