= Malayalam novel =

Novels in the Malayalam language

The Malayalam novel is an important part of Malayalam literature. They are novels written in Malayalam language, a Dravidian language spoken predominantly in the Indian state of Kerala and the Lakshadweep islands.

== Old novels ==
Fulmoni Ennum Koruna Ennum Peraya Randu Sthreekalude Katha (Phulmōni ennuṁ kōruṇa ennuṁ pērāya ranṭu strīkaḷuṭe katha), a translation of Rev. Joseph Peet Hana Catherine Mullens's Bengali novel Fulmoni O Korunar Biboron, is a novel printed and released in Malayalam in 1858. Ghathakawadham (Ghātakavadhaṁ, 1877) by Rev. Richard Collins was the first novel printed and published in Malayalam with a story based in Kerala and around Malayalis. However, it was not originally conceived in Malayalam but was a translation of The Slayer Slain (English, 1864–1866) by Mrs. (Frances) Richard Collins and Rev. Richard Collins. Pathminiyum Karunayum, another translation of Fulmoni O Korunar Biboron, came out in the year 1884 (author unknown). world-famous novels like Ameer Hamza, Gulsanober, etc. were also translated to Malayalam and published in Arabi-Malayalam script during the same era.

The first novel conceived and published in Malayalam was Appu Nedungadi's Kundalatha (1887). Though Kundalatha is not considered a major novel, it gets the pride of place as the first work in the language having the basic characteristics of a novel. It was also the first novel to be written by a Malayali Keralite and the first novel published in Malabar region. It had a historical narrative centred on Kundalatha, the daughter of the king of Kalinga.

O. Chandhu Menon's Indulekha was the first major novel in Malayalam language. It was a landmark in the history of Malayalam literature and initiated the novel as a new flourishing genre. The title refers to the main character in this novel, a beautiful, well educated Nair lady of 18 years. The novel was written at a time when there was an emerging class of upper caste men (mostly Nairs) who received a Western style education, and were achieving prominent positions in British India. The response to Indulekha was so good, that Menon felt encouraged to write another novel. Thus he started writing Sarada and completed writing the first eight chapters in 1892. He released the first volume of the book but the author could add only three more chapters before his death in 1899. C. V. Raman Pillai's Marthandavarma (1891) had many distinctions: it was the first historical novel in any South Indian languages, first novel from Travancore, first Malayalam novel to be a part of a trilogy and the first Malayalam novel to have a masculine title. Marthandavarma was completed even before Indulekha but could not be published until 1891, owing to lack of finance. The novel recounted the history of Venad (Travancore) during the final period of Rajah Rama Varma's reign and subsequently to the accession of Marthanda Varma. The novel had a film adaptation of the same name in 1933 and was the first Malayalam novel to be adapted into film.

The first Malayalam novel that dealt with the socially backward classes was Saraswathy Vijayam by Kunjambu in 1892. Kochuthomman (1892) written by "Kocheeppan Tharakan" was one of the earliest novels on Christian life in Kerala.

=== List of Malayalam-language novels before the 1900s ===
Title	Author	Year	Make	Other notes
Fulmoni Ennum Koruna Ennum Peraya Randu Sthreekalude Katha (ഫുൽമോനി എന്നും കോരുണ എന്നും പേരായ രണ്ടു സ്ത്രീകളുടെ കഥ - Phulmōni ennuṁ kōruṇa ennuṁ pērāya ranṭu strīkaḷuṭe katha)	Rev. Joseph Peet	1858	Translation	First novel printed and released in Malayalam; First novel translated to Malayalam which was originally conceived in an Indian language Translation of The History of Phulmani and Karuna (English, 1853) by Hana Catherine Mullens which is a translation of Fulmoni O Korunar Biboron (Bengali, 1852) by Hana Catherine Mullens
Ghathakawadham (ഘാതകവധം - Ghātakavadhaṁ)	Rev. Richard Collins	1877	Translation	First novel printed and published in Malayalam with a story based in Kerala and around Malayalees; First novel translated to Malayalam which was originally conceived in English; Translation of The Slayer Slain (English, 1864–1866) by Frances Richard Collins and Rev. Richard Collins
Pathminiyum Karunayum (പത്മിനിയും കരുണയും - Patmiṉiyuṁ karuṇayuṁ)	Anonymous Writer	1884	Translation	First repeated translation of a novel to Malayalam; Translation of The History of Phulmani and Karuna (English, 1853) by Hana Catherine Mullens which is a translation of Fulmoni O Korunar Biboron (Bengali, 1852) by Hana Catherine Mullens
Kundalatha (കുന്ദലത - Kundalata)	Appu Nedungadi	1887	Original	First novel conceived and published in Malayalam; First novel by a Malayalee Keralite; First novel from Malabar; First Malayalam novel to have a story outside Kerala and without Malayali characters
Indulekha (ഇന്ദുലേഖ - Indulēkha)	O. Chandhu Menon	1889	Original	First social novel in Malayalam first novel made in Malayalam with Malayali characters and a story based in Malabar, Kerala
Indumathee Swayamvaram (ഇന്ദുമതീസ്വയംവരം - Indumatīsvayaṁvaraṁ)	Padinjare Kovilakathu Ammaman Raja	1890	Original	
Meenakshi (മീനാക്ഷി - Mīṉākṣi)	C. Chathu Nair	1890	Original	
Marthandavarma (മാർത്താണ്ഡവർമ്മ - Māṟttāṇḍavaṟmma)	C. V. Raman Pillai	1891	Original	First Historical novel in Malayalam, Kerala and South India; First novel from Travancore; First Malayalam novel to be a part of a trilogy First Malayalam novel to have a masculine title First Malayalam novel to have a film adaptation
Saraswatheevijayam (സരസ്വതീവിജയം - Sarasvatīvijayaṁ)	Potheri Kunjanbu	1892	Original	
Parishkarapathi (പരിഷ്ക്കാരപ്പാതി - Pariṣkārappāti)	Kochuthomman Appothikari	1892	Original	
Parangodee Parinayam (പറങ്ങോടീപരിണയം - Paṟaṅṅōṭīpariṇayaṁ)	Kizhakepattu Raman Menon	1892	Original	First satirical novel in Malayalam
Sarada (ശാരദ - Śārada)	O. Chandumenon	1892	Original	First novel foretold to have sequels in a trilogy
Lakshmeekeshavam (ലക്ഷ്മീകേശവം - Lakṣmīkēśavaṁ)	Komattil Padu Menon	1892	Original	
Naluperiloruthan (നാലുപേരിലൊരുത്തൻ - Nālupēriloruttan)	C. Anthapayi	1893	Original	
Chandrahasan (ചന്ദ്രഹാസൻ - Candrahāsan)	P. Krishnan Menon; T. K. Krishnan Menon; C. Govindan Eledam	1893	Translation	
Akbar (അക്ബർ - Akbaṟ)	Kerala Varma Valiya Koi Thampuran	1894	Translation	First Historical novel translated to Malayalam; Translation of Akbar (English, 1879) which is a translation of Akbar (Dutch, 1872) by Dr. P. A. S. van Limburg Brouwer
Kalyani (കല്യാണി - Kalyāṇi)	Anonymous Writer	1896	Original	Published in Vidyāvinodini periodical
Sukumari (സുകുമാരി - Sukumāri)	Joseph Mooliyil	1897	Original	
Saguna (സഗുണ - Saguṇa)	Joseph Mooliyil	1898-1899	Translation	Translation of Saguna (English, 1896) by Kirubai Sathyanathan Ammal
Kamala (കമല - Kamala)	C. Krishnan Nair	1899	Translation	Translation of Kamala (English, 1896) by Kirubai Sathyanathan Ammal

== Early 20th century ==
During early 20th century, Malayalam received outstanding novels, either as translations or adaptations of Western literature. Important among them include Kerala Varma Valiya Koi Thampuran's Akbar (translation of Van Linberg Broaver's Dutch novel of the same title, 1894), independent translations of Samuel Johnson's Rasselas by Pilo Paul (1895) and Kanaran (1898), Robinson Crusoe by C. V. Raman Pillai (1916, translation of Daniel Defoe's English novel Robinson Crusoe), Satyakirticharitam by P. N. Krishna Pillai (1930, translation of The Vicar of Wakefield by Oliver Goldsmith), Rajasimhan by K. Govindan Thampi (1930, translation of The Count of Monte Cristo by Alexandre Dumas). Pavangal (1925), a translation of Victor Hugo's Les Misérables by Nalappat Narayana Menon, was a milestone in the history of Malayalam literature and it set off a social reformation of sorts in Kerala. Despite being a translation, it gifted Malayalam a new prose style. Literary critic M. Leelavathy notes: "The translation was an extraordinary phenomenon as it prepared the ground for the Communist movement to take roots in Kerala. With its philosophy of human equality, the heart-wrenching tale of the oppressed left a profound impact in our society. For E.M.S. Namboodiripad, this was Nalapatan's best work. Its influence was both sociological and philological."

More than translations, what influenced Malayalam novels of this era was the works of "C. V. Raman Pillai" and "Chandhu Menon". This era saw many pioneering works in Malayalam literature. Important social novels of the period include Virutan Sanku by Karat Achutha Menon (1912) and Balikasadanam by Kocheeppan Tharakan. Appan Thampuran's Bhuta Rayar (1923) along with six novels by Sardar K. M. Panicker, four based on Kerala history and two based on Indian history, were the significant historical novels of the time. There also have been some attempts to write detective novels, most of them deriving inspirations from popular fictitious detectives in English. The first was that of Appan Thampuran, whose Bhaskara Menon was published as early as 1905. Another novel of the detective genre, Kaalante Kolayara, was written by O. M. Cheriyan in 1918. The first political novels were written by K. Narayana Kurikkal—Parappuram (three parts, 1908) and Udayabhanu (four parts, 1905). The late forties was the time of Progressive literature in Kerala which gained momentum after India's independence in 1947.

== Post-independence period ==
The post-independence period saw a fresh start in the history of longer fiction in Malayalam as in many other Indian languages, parallel to the evolution of post-world war fiction in other parts of the world. It was both a break and a continuation. P. Kesava Dev, who was a Communist in the thirties and forties turned away from diehard ideologies and wrote a symbolic novel called Arku Vendi? (For Whose Sake?) in 1950, challenging the philosophy of Stalinist liquidation of political enemies. It had a special significance in the context of the 'Calcutta thesis'. After portraying the class struggle of farm labourers in Randidangazhi (Two Measures) in 1949, Thakazhi Sivasankara Pillai turned away from party politics and produced a moving romance in Chemmeen (Shrimps) in 1956. For S. K. Pottekkatt and Vaikom Muhammad Basheer, who had not dabbled in politics, the continuity is marked in the former's Vishakanyaka (Poison Maid, 1948) and the latter's Ntuppuppakkoranendarnnu (My Grandpa had an Elephant, 1951). The non-political social or domestic novel was championed by P. C. Kuttikrishnan (Uroob) with his Ummachu (1955) and Sundarikalum Sundaranmarum (Men and Women of Charm, 1958).

In 1957 Basheer’s Pathummayude Aadu (Pathumma’s Goat) brought in a new kind of prose tale, which perhaps only Basheer could handle with dexterity. The fifties thus mark the evolution of a new kind of fiction, which had its impact on the short stories as well. This was the auspicious moment for the entry of M. T. Vasudevan Nair and T. Padmanabhan upon the scene. It was recognised that politics often reduced the larger concerns of life to mere ideological issues, while the life of the individuals constituting the entire population has many other interests and perspectives. The trend away from social realism interpreted in a narrow sense led to the growth of the Malayalam novel in the post-independence era. With the phenomenal success of Chemmeen as a novel and as a film made Thakazhi turn to write on a larger canvas the inclusive accounts of the people around him. The mature works of Pottekkatt, Basheer, Dev, Thakazhi and Uroob make the third quarter of the 20th century among the most significant periods of the Malayalam novel. Pottekkatt's Oru Theruvinte Katha (The Tale of a Street) and Oru Desathinte Katha (The Tale of a Locale) gave the author ample canvas to narrate the stories of a number of individuals and groups. The day-to-day lives of this common humanity is the stuff of great fiction and Pottekkatt got the Jnanpith Award for his magnum opus Oru Desathinte Katha. Thakazhi took up the portrayal of generations of families in Ouseppinte Makkal (Children of Ouseph) and extended it further to write a brihad akhyayika or grand narrative covering the lives of hundreds of characters and dozens of families and several generations. He was writing an entire era and entire region in his magnum opus Kayar (Coir), which procured him the Jnanpith Award. Pottekkatt was perhaps the first to experiment with the writing of an entire region; Thakazhi added the historical dimension by bringing in centuries and generations. In Kayar the life of a whole community in the village complex of Kuttanad covering two centuries and a half, beginning with the land settlement and ending with the land legislation under the first Communist government in Kerala, is narrated. The central concern of the novel is the relation between man and the earth he cultivates. Already Uroob had developed the concept of an extensive canvas in Sundarikalum Sundaranmarum.

The grand narrative became a prominent form in Malayalam fiction during the period after independence. Kesava Dev, in Ayalkar (Neighbours), used the large-framed novel to recount the intricate relationships between different castes and communities. The Nairs, Ezhavas and Christians figure dominantly in the complex and involved story of the people who live in any Kerala village as neighbours. These novelists were depicting Kerala society in its varied dimensions, without designating particular characters as heroes or villains. M. K. Menon (Vilasini, 1928–93) attempted the biggest novel in Malayalam, perhaps also in any Indian language, in Avakasikal (Inheritors), probably motivated by the desire to write the grand narrative centering around a family. His other novels like Inangatha Kannikal (Unfit Chains) and Chundeli (Mouse) were also experimental. Unnikrishnan Puthoor (b. 1933) reveals his control over fictional material with remarkable narrative skill in Balikkallu and Aanappaka. K. L. Mohana Varma (b. 1936), author of novels like Chambal, Ohari (Share) and Cricket, extended the thematic range of fiction, bringing in urban concerns. Another tendency that could be found during this period is the attempt to retell puranic episodes. P. K. Balakrishnan set the trend with his popular redaction of the Mahabharata from the point of view of Droupadi: she is reflecting on the circuitous course of her life during the last night of the battle of Kurukshetra (Ini Njan Urangatte). M. T. Vasudevan Nair's Randamoozham (The Second Turn) recounts the story of Bhimasena, supposed to be the son of Vayu; this is demystified or demythified in the novel. Other writers have also tried to retell other classics in the form of the novel, since the novel has become the most popular form of the narrative in Malayalam. Some of the novels of Kovilan (V. V. Ayyappan, b. 1923) are region-based like his masterpiece Thattakam, but some others are located away from Kerala, in the Himalayas as in his military tales. His works have a remarkable philosophical insight and are written in an answerable style, unique to himself. K. E. Mathai (Parappurath, 1924–81), who also served in the army, is well known for his popular novels such as Panitheeratha Veedu (Unfinished House) Aranazhika Neram (Half an Hour). His friend K. Surendran (1922–97) authored several popular novels like Thaalam (Rhythm), Maya and Kattukurangu (Wild Monkey).

The post-independence novel has been enriched by the contribution of writers living outside Kerala. The pravasi novel has added a fresh chapter, bringing in new landscapes and new characters. The nagara tinai (city landscape) has provided the milieu for some of the best novels in Malayalam. Kakkanadan, O. V. Vijayan, M. Mukundan, Anand and others have annexed these new areas to the concern of the Malayali fiction readers. Not that all of them have located the action in all their writings outside Kerala, but they have brought a new perspective or sensibility, as the pravasi poets have done of late. Kakkanadan (George Varghese, b.1935), once attached to leftist ideology, turned away from it to write one of the most powerful narratives based on that experience in his novel Ushnamekhala (The Tropics). O. V. Vijayan (1931-2004), having spent a number of years in Delhi, locates his classic novel Khasakkinte Itihasam (The Legend of Khasak) in the remote village in his native Palakkad. It has a simple plot but the inlaid narration invests it with a metaphysical or even mystical aura, which marks it out among the works of fiction attempted by Malayalis during the post-freedom period. It may be said that in novelettes like Khasakkinte Itihasam and Gurusagaram, he was turning away from the grand narrative in the realistic mode in favour of metaphorical or allegorical fiction, which was the forte of narratives in ancient India. To suggest a symbolically large design with a short physical frame, in other words to use a microscope as a magnifying glass, is the kind of technique that Vijayan resorted to. It was perhaps better suited to his world vision. Anand also seems to take a cue from Vijayan, but moves away from it so as to make fiction read less like fiction and more like pseudohistory, without abandoning the allegorical element. His Jaivamanushyan and later works follow this pattern, although his first novel 'Alkkoottam ' (The Crowd) had all the ingredients of normative fiction. After a stint at the existentialist novel a la Sartre and Camus, M. Mukundan is a front runner in the post-modern trend with such works as Mayyazhippuzhayude Theerangalil (On the Banks of Mayyazhi), Daivathinte Vikruthikal (God’s Mischief) and Kesavante Vilapangal (The Lamentations of Kesavan). He had also written a critique of modernism much earlier, called Enthanu Aadhunikata? (What is Modernism?). But he has apparently moved on from that position. N. P. Mohammed (1928-2003) too tried his hand at political allegory in Hiranyakasipu high-lighting the horrors of totalitarianism, but moved on to the social novel as in Ennappaadam (Oilfield) and Maram (Tree), which are very sensitive portrayals of the life of the Muslim community, different in style from that of Vaikom Muhammad Basheer. The novel is perhaps the best-seller in the consumerist book market today, and hence there are a large number of writers catering to that trend.

Muttathu Varkey (1918–89) has a number of popular novels to his credit, such as Inapravukal (A Pair of Doves), and Padatha Painkili (The Bird that Doesn’t Sing). These works set a trend in story-telling, involving simple domestic characters in their everyday life with their joys and sorrows told in a rather sentimental melodramatic language. No wonder it attracted a vast number of readers and considerably helped to promote the popularity of the novel form. Today it commands the largest readership of all literary forms. It is even said that it contributed to the growth of literacy. They probably dominate the field of serial fiction in the pulp weeklies and magazines and are Kanam EJ (E. J. Philip, 1926–87), Pulinkunnu Antony, Kottayam Pushpanath, P. V. Thampi, Mallika Yunis, M. D. Ratnamma, etc. etc. It is not easy to list the novelists in this category; their name is a legion. Among the more serious and gifted of these novelists are Sarah Thomas (b. 1934, author of Narmadipudava), P. R. Syamala (1931–90, author of Shyamaranyam among other works), K. B. Sreedevi (b. 1940, author of Yajnam), P. Vatsala (b. 1938, author of Nellu, Agneyam), S. K. Marar ( b. 1930, author of Sharapolimala), G. N. Panikker (b.1937, author of Iruttinte Thazhvara) and George Onakkoor (b. 1941, author of Illam, Ulkkadal). Perumbadavam Sreedharan (b. 1938) has several novels to his credit, the best known among them being Oru Sankeerthanam Pole (Verily like a Psalm), based on the life of Dostoevsky. Among those who have explored the regional novel with an intense flavour of the local language and local social fabric may be mentioned G. Vivekanandan (1923–99, author of Kallichellamma) and U. A. Khader (b.1935, author of Thrikkottoor Peruma). Several writers are there who portray the decline of the feudal system and of the old order of the joint family, among the most prominent is M. T. Vasudevan Nair (b.1933), author of a large number of popular favourites like Nalukettu (Four-chambered House), Asuravithu, etc. The landscape and ethos of the Valluvanad region and the transformations undergone by them in the course of the century, involving relics of the tarawad and the communal tensions provide a challenging theme for the highly evocative style of Vasudevan Nair’s narrative art. The novels of V. K. N. (Narayanankutty Nair, 1932-2004) belong to the small subgenre of satirical fiction, not largely explored after C. V. Raman Pillai’s Premamritam. His Pitamahan and General Chathans take us to the rarefied world of spoofs, giving us occasions for guffaws of laughter. Malayattoor Ramakrishnan (1927–97) wrote Verukal (Roots), depicting the story of his family or community, but he also fictionalised his experience as a senior civil servant in Yanthram (The Machine). Something of the latter kind we find in Chuvappunada (The Red Tape) by E. Vasu (b. 1939), exposing and denouncing the stranglehold of officialdom in the life of the average citizen. C. Radhakrishnan (b. 1939) is a prolific writer of both novels and short stories, with a wide variety of themes and experimental in the narrative mode. Narayan (b. 1939), perhaps a late entrant in the field, came up with his own account of tribal life, otherwise not adequately presented in Malayalam fiction. His short stories as well as his novelettes like Kocharethi have their own special narrative mode and flavour.

Punathil Kunhabdulla (b. 1940) is widely known as the author of popular novels like Smarakasilakal (Memorial Stones) and Marunnu (Medicine). Madampu Kunjukuttan (1941–2021) authored a few very powerful novels, including Ashwathamavu and Bhrashtu (Ostracism). Among the younger generation of novelists born after independence, there are many who have proved their mettle and may yet spring surprises in the years to come. N. S. Madhavan (b. 1948), in his short stories as well as his novels, chooses unfamiliar themes or unfamiliar treatment, as may be seen in Choolaimettile Savangal (The Corpses of Chulaimedu) and Higuita. U. K. Kumaran (b. 1950) is indefatigable in his search for new themes and plots. C. V. Balakrishnan (b. 1952) is the author of Ayussinte Pustakam and T. V. Kochubawa (1955–99) that of Vriddhasadanam (Old Age Home), both eager to explore new areas of experience. Akbar Kakkattil (b. 1954) keeps widening his canvas from time to time. Shihabuddin Poythumkadavu (b. 1963) is a novelist and short story writer.

Twenty-first-century Malayalam littérateurs include T. D. Ramakrishnan (Francis Itty Cora), Benyamin (Aadujeevitham), K. R. Meera (Aarachaar), T. P. Rajeevan (Paleri Manikyam: Oru Pathirakolapathakathinte Katha), Subhash Chandran (Manushyanu Oru Amukham), Khadija Mumtaz (Barsa), Susmesh Chandroth (Paper Lodge) and V. J. James (Nireeswaran).
