= A. Madhavan =

Indian writer (1934–2021)

- Born: 7 February 1934; Thiruvananthapuram,Travancore, British India,(now in Thiruvananthapuram District, Kerala, India).
- Died: 5 January 2021 (aged 86); Thiruvananthapuram District, Kerala
- Occupation: Business
- Spouse: Mrs.Santha
- Children: Mr.Govindarajan (Deceased); Mrs.Kalaiselvi; Mrs.Malarselvi
- Parent(s): Avudainayagam Pillai; Chellammal
- Writing career
- Language: Tamil, Malayalam.
- Genres: short story writer, Novelist, Translator
- Subject: Literature
- Notable awards: Sahitya Akademi Award (2015); Vishnupuram Literary Award (2010)
- Movement: Dravidian movement

A. Madhavan (7 February 1934 – 5 January 2021) was a Tamil writer who won the Sahitya Akademi Award for his collection of essays Ilakkiya Chuvadukal (Traces of Literature). He supported the Dravidian movement.

== Biography ==
Madhavan was born in Thiruvananthapuram to Chellammal and Avudainayagam. He had a small business in the main bazaar of Chalai, Thiruvananthapuram. Madhavan married Santhain 1966 and they have three Children- two daughters Kalai Selvi and Malar Selvi and a son Govinda Rajan. His wife expired in 2002 and after two years in 2004 his son Govinda Rajan also expired very young in his 35 years, which is a tragic event in his life. He was living with his elder daughter until his death. He died on 5 January 2021.

== Literary career ==
A. Madhavan's literary career is defined by his uncompromising realist fiction that vividly captures the commerce, social hypocrisies, and everyday struggles of people around the Thiruvananthapuram marketplace. Despite leaving formal schooling early, his deep reading of world classics of Tolstoy, Dostoyevsky, Chekhov, Mappasant and regional classics of his favourite writers in Tamil were Puthumaippithan, Ku.Pa. Rajagopalan, La. Sa. Ra., and T. Janakiraman allowed him to forge a unique colloquial style blending Tamil and Malayalam tones. He authored three novels—the eco critical Punalum Manalum (1974), the satirical Krishna Parunthu (1982), and Thoovanam (1990)—alongside five short story collections (including Kadaitheru Kathaikal) and the novella Ettavathu Naal, all marked by a value-free, objective lens on human nature. In addition to his original fiction, Madhavan distinguished himself as a translator bridging Malayalam and Tamil literatures. He has translated from Malayalam the novels of Karoor Neelakanta Pillai, Sammaanam (1974) and P.K. Balakrishnan's Ini Naan Urangatte (2002) into Tamil and contributed significantly to the literary community through his editorial leadership and institutional roles.

== Bibliography ==
=== Short Story ===
- Kadaitheru Kathaigal (கடைத்தெருக் கதைகள்) -1974
- Moha pallavi (மோகபல்லவி) -1974
- Kamini Moolam (காமினி மூலம்) - 1975
- Madhavan Kathaigal (மாதவன் கதைகள்) - 1984
- Aanai Chantham (ஆனைச் சந்தம்) -1990
- Arabian Horse (அரேபியக் குதிரை) -1995
- A. Madhavan Kathaigal (ஆ. மாதவன் கதைகள்) - 2002
- Muthukkal Pathu (முத்துக்கள் பத்து) - 2007

=== Novel ===
- Krishna Parunthu (கிருஷ்ணப் பருந்து) -1982
- Punalum Manalum (புனலும் மணலும்) -1974
- Thoovaanam (தூவானம்)- 1990

=== Tamil Translations ===
- Yakshi by Malayatoor Ramakrishnan Unpublished.
- Ini Njan Urangatte by P.K. Balakrishnan (இனி நான் உறங்கட்டும்) -2002
- Sammaanam by Karur Neelakanta Pillai (சம்மானம்) - 1974

=== English Translations ===
On a River’s Bank by M Vijayalakshmi (புனலும் மணலும்) -2018

== Awards ==
- Sahitya Akademi Award (2015) for his collection of essays Ilakkiya Chuvadukal
- Kalaimamani award (2009)
- Vishnupuram Literary Award (2010)
- Sirukathai Selvar (1977) – Awarded by the literary organization Shenbakom.
- Thiruppur Tamil Sangam Award (1994) – For his short story collection Arabiya Kudirai.
- Ulloor Award (2002) – Conferred by the Thiruvananthapuram Tamil Sangam.
- Tamizh Maamani (2003) – Awarded by the Kanyakumari District Tamil Writers' Sangam.

== See also ==
- List of Sahitya Akademi Award winners for Tamil
- List of Indian writers
- List of Tamil-language writers
