= Pulliman =

Pulliman may refer to these Indian films:

- Pulliman (1972 film), Malayalam film released in 1972 starring Madhu and Devika
- Pulliman (2010 film), Malayalam film released in 2010 starring Kalabhavan Mani and Meera Nandan
