= Njavalppazhangal =

- Directed by: P. M. A. Azeez
- Written by: S. K. Pottakkat; G. Sankarapillai (dialogues)
- Screenplay by: P. M. Abdul Azees
- Produced by: M. K. Kunhi Mohamed
- Starring: Mohan Sharma; Vidhubala; Sukumari; Balan K. Nair
- Cinematography: Madhu Ambat; Shaji N. Karun
- Edited by: P. M. A. Azeez
- Music by: Shyam
- Release date: 28 May 1976
- Country: India
- Language: Malayalam

Njavalppazhangal is a 1976 Indian Malayalam-language film, directed by P. M. A. Azeez and produced by M. K. Kunhi Mohamed. The film stars Mohan Sharma, Vidhubala, Sukumari and Balan K. Nair in the lead roles. The film has musical score by Shyam.

== Cast ==
- Mohan Sharma
- Vidhubala
- Sukumari
- Balan K. Nair
- Kuthiravattam Pappu
- Mallika Sukumaran
- Manju Bhargavi
- Santha Devi

== Soundtrack ==
All lyrics are written by Mullanezhi; all music is composed by Shyam.

Track listing
| No. | Title | Artist(s) | Length |
|---|---|---|---|
| 1. | "Amme Amme Amme Makkal" | S. Janaki, P. Jayachandran |
| 2. | "Chellakkaattu Varanundu" |
| 3. | "Ezhu Malakalkkumappurathu" | Ambili |
| 4. | "Kannu Kothikkunna" | C. O. Anto |
| 5. | "Karukaruthoru Pennaanu" | K. J. Yesudas |
| 6. | "Malakalezhum" | Choir |
| 7. | "Ooruvittu Paruvittu" | L. R. Eswari |
| 8. | "Thurakkoo Mizhithurakkoo" | S. Janaki |
