= S. M. Street =

Street in Kozhikode, Kerala

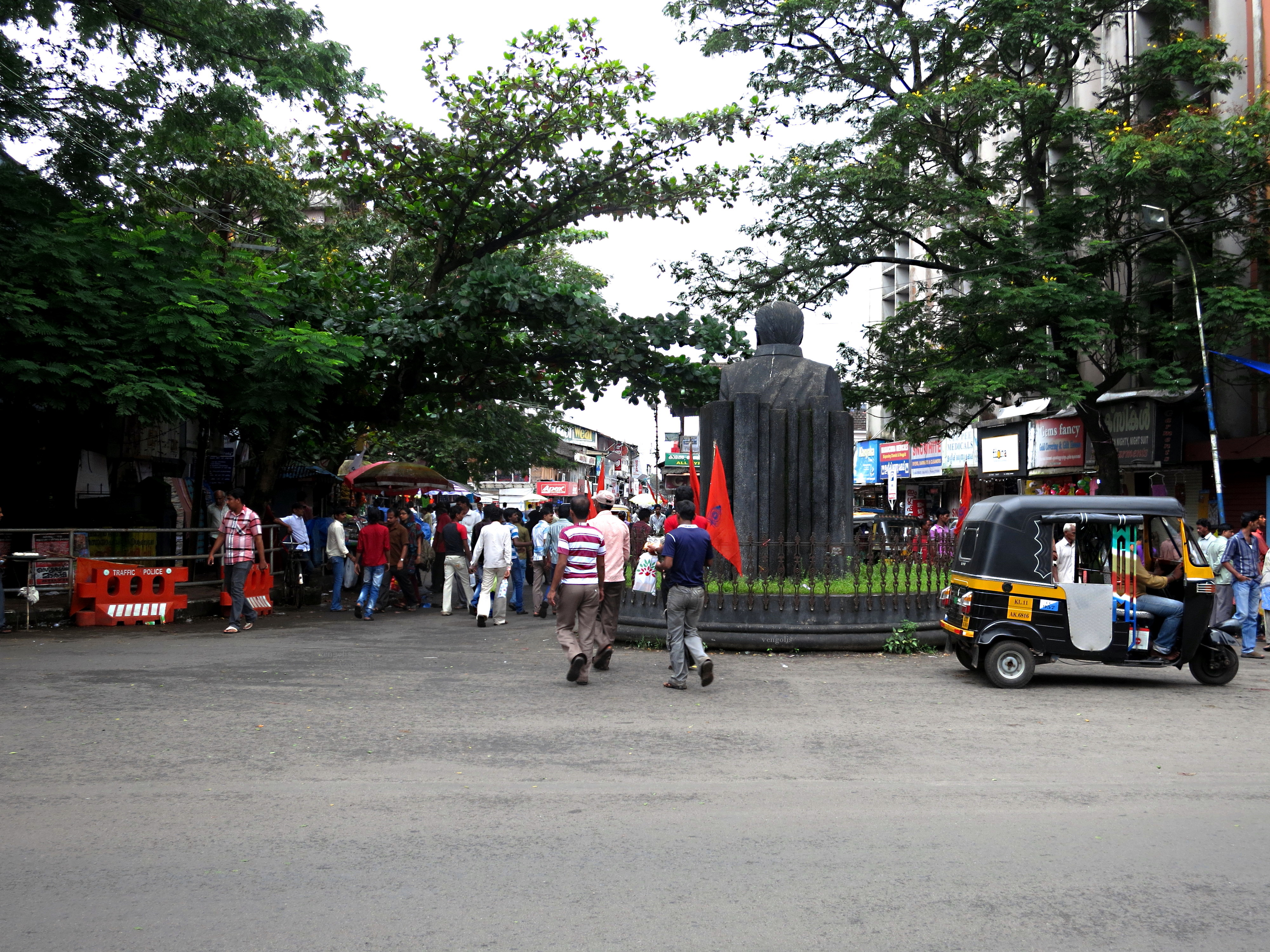
- The S.K. Pottekkatt statue facing S.M. Street in Kozhikode
- Interactive map of S. M. Street
- Length: 1.3 mi (2.1 km)
- Location: Kozhikode, Kerala, India
- Coordinates: 11°15′2″N 75°46′54″E

Other
- Known for: Halva, Textile, Sweets

S.M. Street, abbreviation for Sweetmeat Street, also known as Mittai Theruvu, is the busiest shopping street in kerala located in Kozhikode, Kerala, India. The street is a pedestrian zone. It also has a 160 year old fire temple amidst shopping places.

== History ==
The history of S. M. Street dates back to time of the Zamorin when the ruler invited Gujarati sweetmeat makers to set up shop in the city and accommodated their shops just outside the palace walls.

== About the name ==
S. M. Street derives its name from the time it was lined with sweetmeat and halvah stalls. Its Malayalam name is Mittai Theruvu.

== Renovation of S. M. Street ==
In May 2017, as part of the first phase of the S. M. Street beautification project, an amount of Rs. 3.64 crore was allocated. As part of the renovation, overhead power supply lines were removed and lamp posts were placed across the sides of the street. Chief Minister Pinarayi Vijayan formally opened the renovated S. M. Street on 23 December 2017.

== In popular culture ==
S. M. Street is the subject of the Kerala Sahitya Akademi Award-winning book Oru Theruvinte Katha by S. K. Pottekkatt. The statue of S. K. Pottekkatt, stands facing the street.

== Image gallery ==
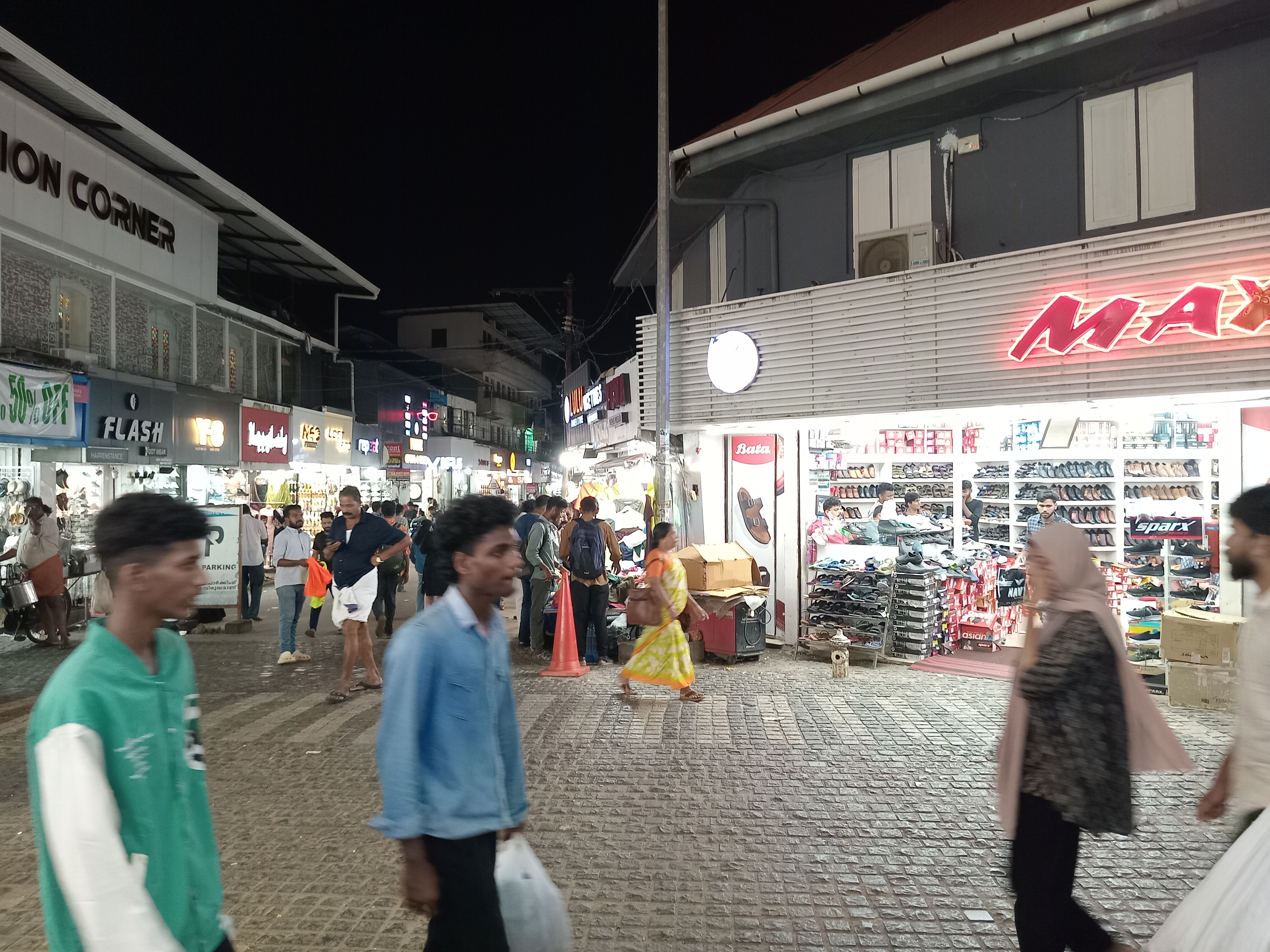

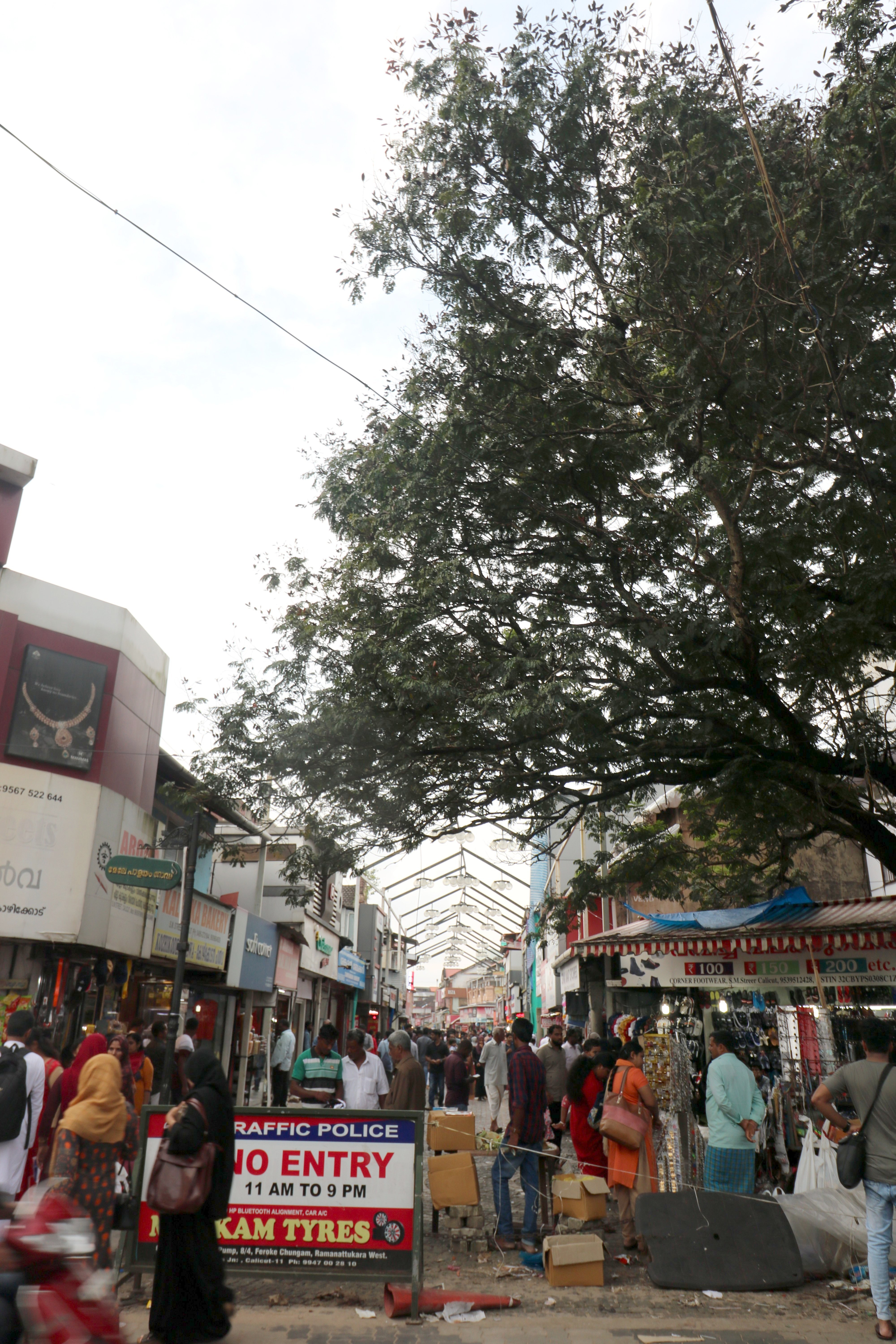

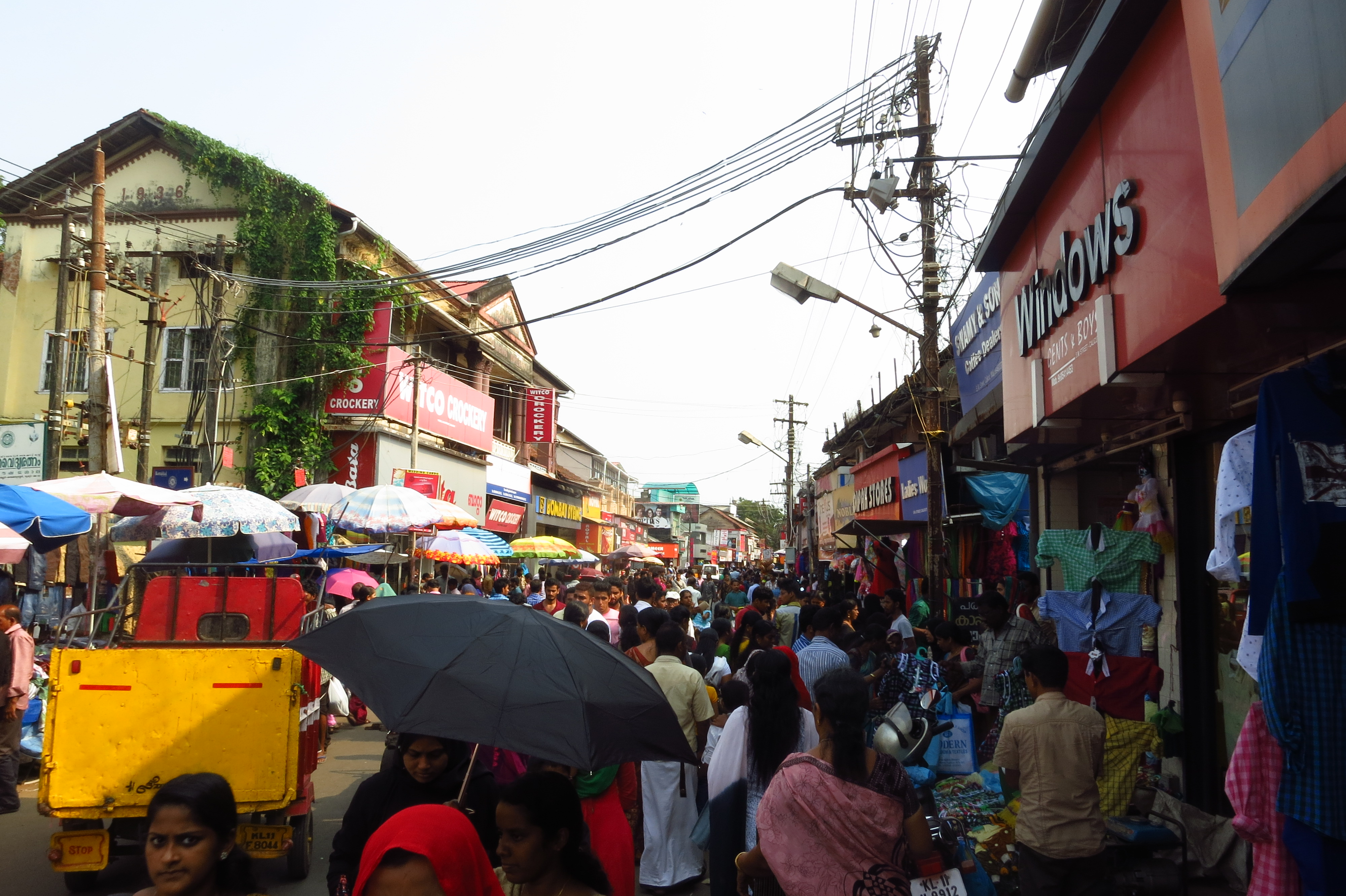
Looking south
