= Oru Theruvinte Katha =

1960 novel by S. K. Pottekkatt

- Cover page for the latest edition by D. C. books
- Author: S. K. Pottekkatt
- Original title: ഒരു തെരുവിന്റെ കഥ
- Language: Malayalam
- Publisher: D. C. Books
- Publication date: September 1960
- Publication place: India
- Pages: 290
- ISBN: 9788171305797
- Followed by: Oru Desathinte Katha

Oru Theruvinte Katha (English: The Story of a Street) is a Malayalam novel written by S. K. Pottekkatt and published in 1960. It sketches a host of characters who spend their lives making a living in ‘The Street’. However the central character can be discerned as Krishnakuruppu, who is mostly addressed as 'Kuruppu', 'Paper Kuruppu' and even 'Vishamasthithi' due to his usage of the phrase 'Kaaryam Vishamasthithi' (Malayalam: കാര്യം വിഷമസ്ഥിതി) or 'situation is difficult' in English when calling out headlines while selling news papers. Some of the minor characters are introduced to the reader through Kuruppu, where he is shown to be in conversation about them with other prominent characters of the street. The street is based on the S.M. Street or popularly known as Mithai Theruvu (Sweet Meat Street) in Kozhikode, Kerala. It won the Kerala Sahitya Academy Award of 1961.

== Plot ==
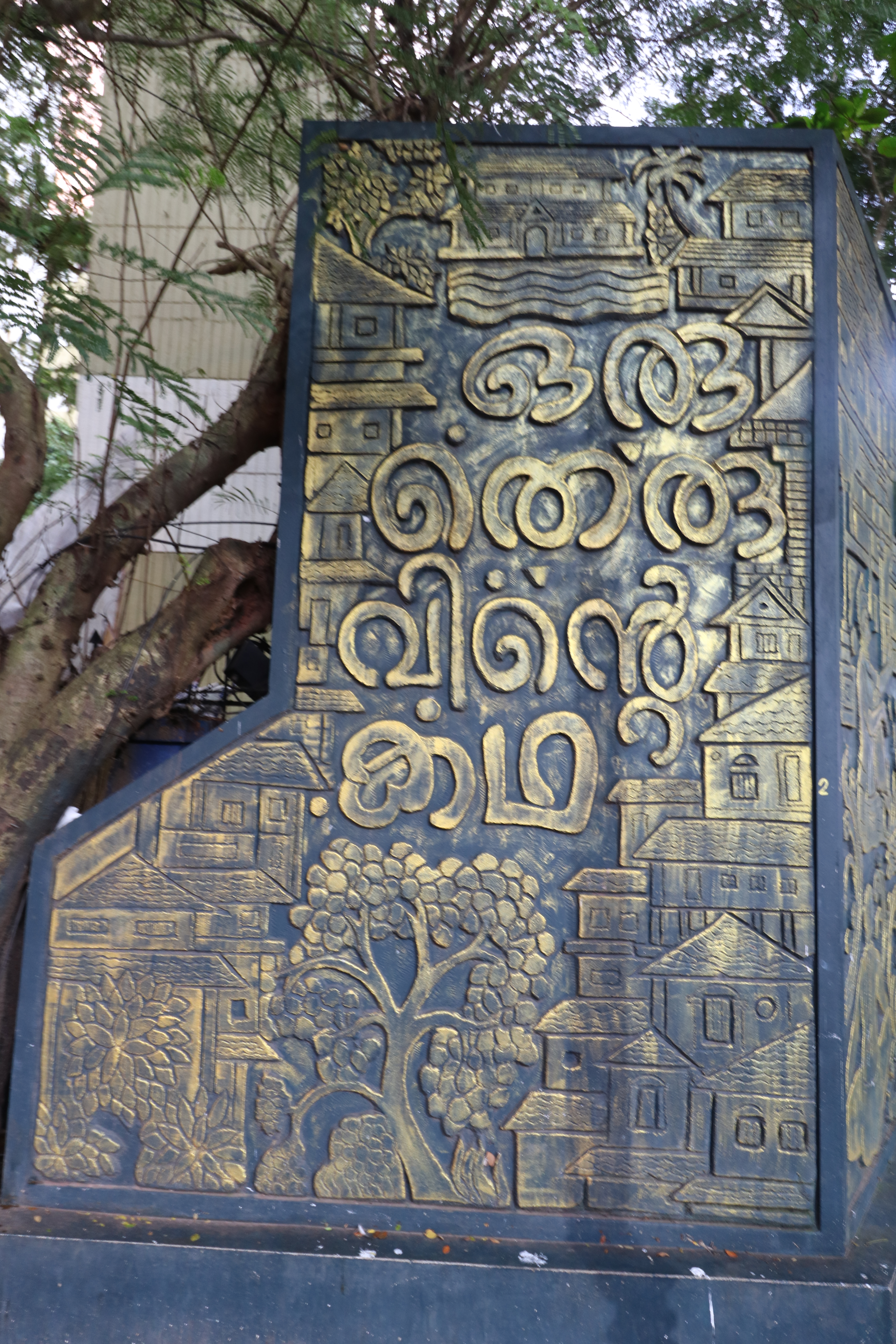
A plaque in S. M. Street, Calicut, with the title of the novel inscribed on it

The novel is set as parallel stories in each chapter, dealing with a particular character or a group of characters. However, from the fifth chapter onwards, Kuruppu emerges as the central character. Kuruppu is a newspaper street vendor who makes his living by selling newspapers and a particular ‘Gandharvan’ magazine, which appears to be a local version of a men's magazine. The magazine is distributed only to select customers (some of the other major characters) who approach Kuruppu for these in particular. It is mostly through the eyes of Kuruppu that the novel unfolds. Kuruppu is shown as struggling to make ends meet and having difficulty in paying for the upkeep of his daughter, Radha. In this he is helped to an extent by ‘Omanji’ or Lazar who is fond of Radha and shares her interest in the growing of rose shrubs. Kuruppu is also shown as a passive observer in some of the happenings in the street. Some incidents are explained through the eyes of his daughter Radha. For instances and incidents where he is not present, it shown as if these are narrated to him by the other characters. A vast cast of characters are introduced, who are mostly vagabonds, prostitutes, seedy characters, rich businessmen, beggars, charlatans and con artists and a gang of street kids. The novel ends with the death of Radha, who succumbs to brain fever and Kuruppu trying to hold himself together and start life anew.

== Main characters ==
- Krishnakuruppu - Also known as ‘Paperkuruppu’ and fondly addressed as 'Kuruppu' (Malayalam: കുറുപ്പ്) . He sells newspapers and magazines in the street.
- Radha - Daughter of Kuruppu who is about ten years old.
- Omanji/Lazar - An officer in the customs division, who is fond of Kuruppu and Radha. He dies of smallpox.
- Murugan - Blind beggar who secretly stashes his wealth from begging as gold coins and jewellery. Kuruppu helps Murukan and also borrows money from him at times of need.
- Sudhakaran Muthalali - A rich businessman who loves a woman called Malathi, married to another. He lives a loose life and is given over to drink and women.
