= Indulekha (novel) =

1889 novel by O. Chandu Menon

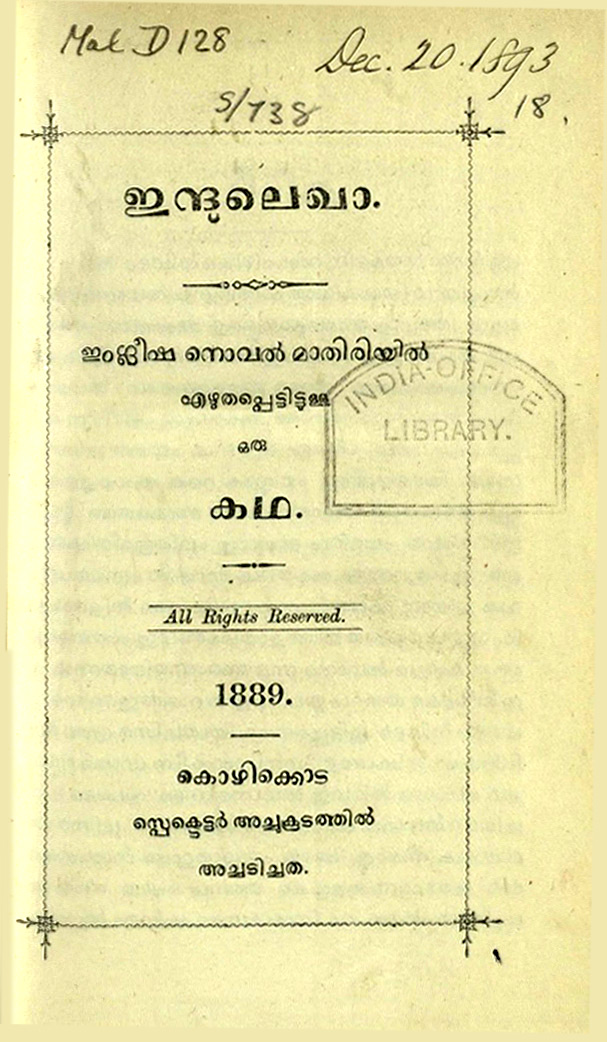
- The title page of first edition.
- Author: O. Chandu Menon
- Original title: ഇന്ദുലെഖാ
- Language: Malayalam
- Genre: Novel
- Publisher: Author (1889), Educational & General Book Depot. Kozhikode (1890)
- Publication date: 9 December 1889
- Publication place: India
- Media type: Print (Paperback)
- Pages: 498
- Original text: ഇന്ദുലെഖാ at Internet Archive

Indulekha is a Malayalam novel written by O. Chandu Menon. Published in 1889, it was the first major novel in the Malayalam language. It was a landmark in the history of Malayalam literature and initiated the novel as a new flourishing genre. The novel is about a beautiful, well-educated lady of a Nair tharavad.

== Background ==
The title Indulekha, refers to the prodigy in this novel, a beautiful, well educated Nair lady of 20 or 22 years.

The novel was written at a time when there was an emerging class of upper caste men (mostly Nairs) who received a Western style education, and were achieving prominent positions in British India. The period was a clash of cultures, as the educated Indians were torn between Western ideals and traditional practices. The Nambudiri Brahmins of Kerala, traditionally had marital relations with Nair women, known as Sambandham, since only the oldest Nambudiri youth was allowed to marry a Brahmin girl. The younger sons were encouraged to have Sambandham with Nair women, in order to maintain male primogeniture, since the children born from such relations belonged to their mother's family. The matriarchy practiced by the Nairs was also coming under attack during this period. Many of the Nambudiri men, though learned in Vedas and Sanskrit, had little knowledge of English and Western sciences. The novel highlights the lack of willingness of the Nambudiris to adapt to the change of times, as well as the struggle by Nair women to break out of the age-old principle of Sambandham, which had little relevance during the late 19th century.

Chandu Menon has written that he initially meant Indulekha as a translation of Benjamin Disraeli's Henrietta Temple (1836), but, having struggled with the subtleties of an alien culture, he abandoned the project in favour of writing one on his own, depicting a similar story.

== Plot summary ==
Indulekha is a graceful Nair girl with good intelligence and artistic talent. She is a young and educated, knowledgeable woman with education in English and Sanskrit, who is in love with a young man, Madhavan, the hero of the novel, who is also presented in ideal colours as a member of the newly educated Nair class, graduated from the University of Madras. He is dressed in western clothes, but at the same time, he has kept a long tuft of hair according to the Nair custom. The story details how the matrilineal society of those times encourages Namboothiris to start a relationship with Indulekha. Indulekha promptly snubs the old Nambudiri man, but Madhavan in haste runs away from the household to Bengal. There he makes a lot of good friends. In the end, he arrives back and is united with Indulekha. They then leave for Madras, present day Chennai. The story emphasizes inter-caste marriage.

The old Namboothiri represents the decadence of feudalism and its polygamous practices. Indulekha, the novel's educated heroine, dramatizes the resistance of a progressive Nair woman. She refuses to succumb to the oppression of the Namboothiri and marries Madhavan, who stands up to the social evils of the period.

== Characters ==
- Indulekha
- Madhavan
- suri nambuthiri
- Lakshmikutti Amma—the mother of Indulekha
- Panju menon

.polyadic

== 2014 research findings ==
Title page of second edition (1890)

In 2014 April, literary critics Dr. P. K. Rajasekharan and Dr. P. Venugopalan, published a well accepted research finding in Mathrubhumi Weekly, according to which the available version of the novel is a revised and edited version of the original one. According to the findings, the original novel which made a strong advocacy for women's empowerment was mercilessly edited and those who published the book in later years chopped off many such portions. The last chapter (chapter 20) was the most edited one. Ravi Deecee, publisher, D C Books, after corresponding with the British Library in London for over two years and browsing through the rare collections for days have sourced the particular edition to the library, which was made available to the respective critics.

== Publication history ==
The novel was published in 1889 by 'Spectator Achukoodam'. It went out-of-print in March 1890 and the second edition was published by 'Kozhikode Educational and General Book Depot' in June 1890. The 51st edition of the novel was published in 1951 by Vidyavardhini Publishers, Trivandrum. The book entered public domain in the 1950s. The first National Book Stall (NBS) edition of the novel came in 1955. Although the previous editions of the book had variations from the original the first NBS edition was a completely revised and edited one. They went to the extent of removing the whole 18th chapter which according to noted critic M. P. Paul, had badly affected the continuity of the novel. Other NBS editions however replaced the 18th chapter but many other changes they made still persist in all the available versions of the book.

== Translations ==
The first English translation was by John Willoughby Francis Dumergue, a friend of O. Chandu Menon who worked as a Malayalam translator to the Madras Government. Another translation of the novel under the title Crescent Moon by R. Leeladevi was published in 1979. A translation by Anitha Devasia was published by Oxford University Press in 2005 and included in their Oxford India Paperbacks series.

== Adaptations ==
The first adaptation of the novel was in 1896; a play under the title Indulekha was performed by National Club at V. J. T. Hall, Trivandrum. Further performances were held at Madras (1905) and Calicut (1911). In 1967, Kalanilayam Krishnan Nair adapted the novel into a film of the same title. The screenplay was written by Vaikom Chandrasekharan Nair and the film starred Krishnan Nair's son Rajmohan as Madhavan and Sreekala as Indulekha.

== See also ==
- Malayalam novel
- Sarada (novel)
- Kundalatha
