= Naadan Premam (film) =

- Directed by: Crossbelt Mani
- Screenplay by: Thoppil Bhasi
- Based on: Naadan Premam by S. K. Pottekkatt
- Produced by: N. Vishweshwaraiah; P. S. Gopalakrishnan
- Starring: Madhu; Sheela; Adoor Bhasi; Prema
- Cinematography: P. Ramaswami
- Edited by: Chakrapani
- Music by: V. Dakshinamoorthy
- Production company: Sakthi Enterprises
- Distributed by: Sakthi Enterprises
- Release date: 5 May 1972
- Country: India
- Language: Malayalam

Naadan Premam (English: Love in the Countryside) is a 1972 Indian Malayalam film adaptation of S. K. Pottekkatt's novel of the same name. It is directed by Crossbelt Mani and produced by N. Vishweshwaraiah and P. S. Gopalakrishnan. The film stars Madhu, Sheela, Adoor Bhasi and Prema in the lead roles. The film had musical score by V. Dakshinamoorthy.

== Cast ==
- Madhu as Ikkoran
- Sheela as Malu
- Adoor Bhasi as Khader Mappila
- Prema as Padmini
- Sankaradi as Gopalan
- T. R. Omana as Paaru
- Bahadoor as Chandran
- K. P. Ummer as Ravi
- S. P. Pillai as Kunjan
- Paravoor Bharathan as Ravi's father
- Santha Devi as Amina
- Thodupuzha Radhakrishnan as club secretary

== Soundtrack ==
The music was composed by V. Dakshinamoorthy and the lyrics were written by P. Bhaskaran.

No.	Song	Singers	Lyrics	Length (m:ss)
1	"Cheppum Panthum"	K. J. Yesudas	P. Bhaskaran	
2	"Kanni Nilaavu"	P. Susheela	P. Bhaskaran	
3	"Mayangaatha Ravukalil"	L. R. Eeswari	P. Bhaskaran	
4	"Paaril Sneham"	K. J. Yesudas	P. Bhaskaran	
5	"Panchaarakkunnine"	K. J. Yesudas	P. Bhaskaran	
6	"Undanennoru Raajaavinu"	P. Jayachandran	P. Bhaskaran	
