= Naadan Premam =

1941 novel by S. K. Pottekkatt

- Author: S. K. Pottekkatt
- Language: Malayalam
- Publisher: Mathrubhumi Books
- Publication date: 1941
- Publication place: India
- Pages: 80
- ISBN: 978-81-8265-209-5

Naadan Premam (English: Love in the Countryside) is a Malayalam novel written by S. K. Pottekkatt in 1941. It is a short novel written when the author was in Bombay and tells the story of an innocent village belle jilted by a modern man-about-town. It is set entirely in Mukkam, a rustic village on the banks of the Iruvanjippuzha, a major tributary of River Chaliyar. Written initially as a film treatment and later converted into a novel, it was serialised in Kerala Kaumudi newspaper and released as a book in August 1941. It was adapted into a film of the same name in 1972 but was not a success on the screen.

The novel is an important chapter in the history of Mukkam. The writer resided on the banks of Iruvanjippuzha for some time before he left for Bombay to write the novel. In 2005, a memorial was built at the heart of Mukkam, on the banks of the Iruvanjippuzha, as a tribute to the writer.

== Plot summary ==
Ravindran, a young rich man from Kozhikode, is living anonymously in Mukkam, a small village on the banks of Iruvanjippuzha. There he falls in love with a young village girl by the name Maalu. Ravi decides to leave after staying for two months and assures Maalu that he will return. Maalu does not inform him that she's pregnant. Few days later, Maalu receives a letter from him saying that he will be going for a Europe tour and will return after six months. Fearing the social stigma if she gives birth to a fatherless child, Maalu is forced to marry Ikkoran, who is compassionate and agrees to nurture the child as his own.

Years later, Ravi, who is living with grief over childlessness, returns to the village with his wife Padmini. He meets a young lad there whom he identifies as his own son (Raghavan). He pleads to Maalu and Ikkoran to take Raghavan along with him. Ikkoran waves him off saying he is a lunatic and that it is their child. Ravi returns heartbroken and falls ill. He sends a letter to Maalu saying that he wishes to see his son once more before he dies. She complies and takes the child to Ravi's house. Seeing Ravi's condition, Ikkoran decides to leave the child there. Later, Ravi gets a letter from his friend Mr. Burton saying that Ikkoran and Maalu drowned themselves in the river. The final chapter shows Ravi living happily with Raghavan in the estate he has newly purchased in Mukkam.
