= P. K. Balakrishnan =

Indian novelist and critic

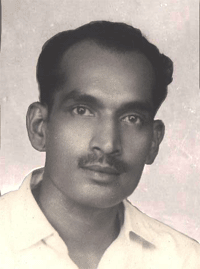
- Born: Panikkassery Keshavan Balakrishnan; March 2, 1925; Edavanakkad, Ernakulam, Kingdom of Cochin
- Died: April 3, 1991 (aged 66); Thiruvananthapuram, Kerala, India
- Occupations: Novelist, critic, essayist, Journalist, Historian
- Spouse: K. Bhageerathi
- Children: Harikesh, Harikrishnan, Jayalekshmy
- Relatives: Keshavan (father); Mani Amma (mother)
- Writing career
- Notable works: Narayana Guru, Tippu Sultan, Novel Sidhiyum Sadhanayum, Kavyakala Kumaranaasaniloode, Pluto Priyapetta Pluto, Ini Njan Urangatte, Jathivyavasthitiyum Kerala Charitravum, Balakrishnante Lekhanangal, Keraleeyathayum Mattum, Ezhuthachante Kala
- Notable awards: 1974 Kerala Sahitya Akademi Award for Novel; 1978 Vayalar Award; SPBF Award; Prof Velayudhan Endowment Award; Kesari Award
- Website: pkbalakrishnan.com

Panikkassery Keshavan Balakrishnan (March 2, 1925 – April 3, 1991) was an Indian novelist and critic. A doyen of Malayalam literature, he is best known for his novel, Ini Njan Urangatte (And now, Let me Sleep), a novel based on Mahabharata as well as a number of critical studies which include Chandu Menon Oru Padanam, Novel Siddhiyum Sadhanayum, Kavyakala Kumaranasaniloode, and Ezhuthachante Kala: Chila Vyasabharatha Patanangalum. His Jathivyavasthayum Kerala Charitravum is a work in social history.

Kerala Sahitya Akademi awarded him their annual award for novel in 1974. He was also a recipient of the Vayalar Award and other honours.

== Biography ==
P. K. Balakrishnan was born on March 2, 1925, at Edavanakad at Vypin island in Kerala to Keshavan and Mani Amma. After early schooling in Edavanakkad, he joined Maharaja's College, Ernakulam but his studies were disrupted after four years when he participated in Quit India Movement and was jailed.

Although he was released from jail in 1944 and resumed his studies, he could not complete it as he joined Kochi rajya prajamandalam to enter politics only to move to Kerala Socialist Party (KSP) soon. His association with KSP brought him into contact with Mathai Manjooran, a noted Indian independence activist and KSP leader as well as Vaikom Muhammad Basheer and M. K. Sanu, among others.

Later, he took up the editorship of Dinaparabha but he had to quit following a public speech he made at a temple in Kozhikode. Later, he became associated with such publications as Kerala Bhooshanam, Kerala Kaumudi and Madhyamam.

Balakrishnan died on April 3, 1991, at the age of 66.

== Legacy ==
The first of Balakrishnan's published works was a book on Narayana Guru, which was a compilation of writings on Guru, including biographical sketches, narratives on Guru's activities and his literary contributions. This was followed by critiques Chandu Menon, Kumaran Asan and Ezhuthachan.

In his writings, he first dealt with Kerala history in the anthology on Narayana Guru, the great social reformer of Kerala who changed the face of its caste-ridden society. He brushes with Kerala history again to study why Tipu Sultan, an able ruler and administrator is perceived as an aggressor and a religious fanatic. The culmination of these studies over 3 decades was his work on the social history which departed from the established narration, titled Jaathivyavasthayum Kerala Charitravum (The Caste System and History of Kerala).

Pluto, Priyapetta Plutto, was his first novel, was a real life story about his own dog. His next novel, Ini Njan Urangatte, a Mahabharata inspired work, is considered by many to be his magnum opus. This novel, has been translated into English by K.C. Sarsamma under the title And Now Let Me Sleep. Two decades after P. K. Balakrishnan's death, his daughter P. K. Jayalekshmy has been made another English translation under the title Battle beyond Kurukshetra. Balakrishnan also wrote a number of articles, of which only four collections have been published; two of them were published after his lifetime.

== Awards and honours ==
P. K. balakrishnan received the Kerala Sahitya Akademi Award for Novel in 1974 for his work, Ini Njan Urangatte. Four years later, the same novel fetched him another major award in the form of Vayalar Award of 1978. He received the Kerala History Association Award for the book, Jaathivyavasthithium Keralacharithravum. He was also a recipient of SPBF Award, Prof. Velayudhan Endowment Award and Kesari Award.

== Works ==
- P. K. Balakrishnan, ed. (1954). Narayana Guru. DC Books. Archived from the original on 3 April 2019. "an anthology on the social reformer of Kerala"
- P. K. Balakrishnan (1957). Chandu Menon Oru Padanam. DC Books. ISBN 9788126412686. Archived from the original on 3 April 2019. "Chandu Menon, a Study - on the author of the first Malayalam novel, Indulekha"
- P. K. Balakrishnan (1959). Tippu Sulthan. DC Books. ISBN 9788126414703. Archived from the original on 3 April 2019. "a historical biography"
- P. K. Balakrishnan (1963). Pluto Priyappetta Pluto. DC Books. ISBN 9788126408931. Archived from the original on 3 April 2019. "Pluto, My Dear Pluto - the story of his real life dog named after the Walt Disney counterpart"
- P. K. Balakrishnan (1965). Novel Siddhiyum Sadhanayum. DC Books. ISBN 9788126411788. Archived from the original on 3 April 2019. "a work on the craft of novel writing, based on the works of Dostoevsky, Tarasankar Bandyopadhyay and Jane Austen"
- P. K. Balakrishnan (1970). Kavyakala Kumaranasaniloode. DC Books. ISBN 9788126412563. Archived from the original on 3 April 2019. "The Art of Poetry through Kumaran Asan - on Malayalam poet Kumaran Asan"
- Ini Njan Urangatte (And now, Let me Sleep) (1973) - A work originating from the great Indian epic Vyasabharatha (Mahabharath).
- P. K. Balakrishnan (1982). Ezhuthachante Kala : Chila Vyasabharatha Patanangalum. DC Books. ISBN 9788126421329. Archived from the original on 3 April 2019. "a work on the father of Malayalam literature and some studies on The Mahabharata"
- Jaathivyavasthithium Keralacharithravum (The Caste system and History of Kerala) (1983) - a work in Kerala history.
- P. K. Balakrishnan (2004). P. K. Balakrishnante Lekhanangal. DC Books. ISBN 8126407794. Archived from the original on 3 April 2019. "Articles of Balakrishnan"
- Keraleeyatayum Mattum (The Essence of Kerala etc.) (2004) - a collection of 20 articles published in various periodicals over a time
- P. K. Balakrishnan (2011). Veritta Chintakal. Pratheeksha Books. "Thoughts Apart - Commentaries on social and political history of India triggered by contemporary events. Collected from articles written in Malayalam daily Madhyamam"
- P. K. Balakrishnan (2015). Oru Veera Pulakathinte Katha. Poornna Printing And Publishing House. ASIN B077XCCHZ4. "The Story of a Heroic Thrill - a collection of articles"

=== Translations of Ini Njan Urangatte ===
- P.K. Balakrishnan (1999). And Now Let Me Sleep. Translated by K.C. Sarsamma. Sahitya Akademi. ISBN 9788126006816. "English translation"
- P.K. Balakrishnan (2018). Battle Beyond Kurukshetra: A Mahabharata Novel. Translated by P. K. Jayalekshmy. Oxford University Press. ISBN 978-0-19-909322-9. "English translation"
- P. K. Balakrishnan (2001). Ini Naan Urangattum. Translated by A. Madhavan. Sahitya Akademi. ISBN 8126010843. Archived from the original on 3 April 2019. "Tamil translation"
- P. K. Balakrishnan (2000). Naninnu Nidrisuve. Translated by Sara Aboobacker. Sahitya Akademi. ISBN 9788126007233. "Kannada translation"
- P. K. Balakrishnan (2017). Ab Mujhe Sone Do. Translated by G. Gopinathan. Partishruti Prakashan. ISBN 978-8126050710. "Hindi translation"

== See also ==
- List of Malayalam-language authors
