= P. K. Rajasekharan =

Indian writer, critic

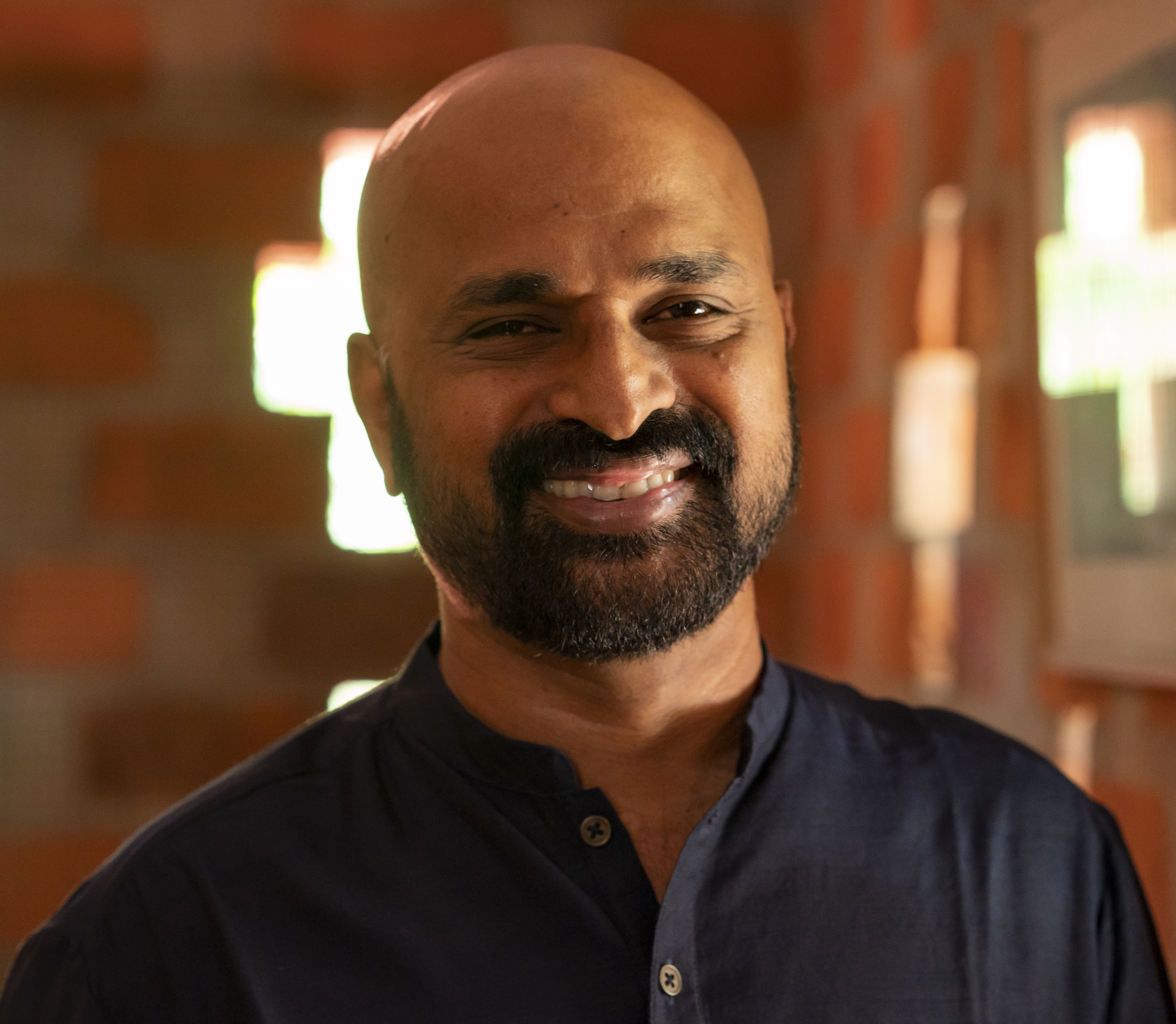
- Born: 21 February 1966 (age 60); Thiruvananthapuram, Kerala, India
- Occupations: Literary critic, author, orator, newspaper editor
- Writing career
- Language: Malayalam
- Genres: Literary criticism, essays
- Notable awards: Kerala Sahitya Akademi Award, Vilasini Award, Thoppil Ravi Award

P. K. Rajasekharan is a literary critic in Malayalam language, and is the winner of Kerala Sahitya Akademi Award for Literary Criticism in 1997. Rajasekharan is an orator, author, and editor of various books. He was news editor of the Mathrubhumi newspaper.

== Early life and education ==
P. K. Rajasekharan was born on 21 February 1966 in Karippuru, near Malayinkeezh, in Thiruvananthapuram District. After finishing his graduate and post-graduate schooling in Malayalam from the University College Trivandrum, Rajasekharan obtained his PhD from the University of Kerala.

== Writings and ideas ==
P. K. Rajasekharan is one of the foremost postmodern literary critics in Malayalam. The anthology of essays titled Novel : bhodhavum prathibodhavum, edited by Rajasekharan and Azad in 1992 is the first book that began debates about post modern turn in Malayalam literature. "The most significant contribution of Rajasekharan is that he analysed post modern literature in Malayalam theoretically and expanded that aesthetics. His contribution is commendable in developing spatial studies in Malayalam. Studies on novels, and studies about the relationship between cyber culture and literature are also significant." In the critical study of the novels of O. V. Vijayan, titled Pitrukhatikaram (1994), Rajasekharan construes the newer questions of genus. Ekantha Nagarangal (2006) presented that the modernism in Malayalam doesn't have a common aesthetic backdrop but rather has a collective of didderent modernisms. Andhanaya Daivam (1999) is a wide-ranging study of Malayalam novel from its beginning in the 1890 s to the end of 20th century. This significant works elicits the caste and class politics underlining the early Malayalam novels. This work focused exclusively on the trajectory of the Malayalam novels which had crossed the centennial mark. An observation that Rajasekharan makes about the history of Malayalam novels buttresses the scope of the argument of this article as well. He states, "In novel [as a genre], we find the continuous process of Malayali self-fashioning, development and instability. This quality, which is incomplete in other literary forms, makes the history of Malayalam novels our own history" (page no 14). This unique characteristic of Malayalam novels is the result of the introduction of realistic narration in the genre to deal with contemporary issues. Therefore, the early Malayalam novels also record:

- Multiple ways in which Malayali community encountered modernity,
- Their responses to the changes taking place in the existing social structures, and
- Their anxieties, fears and aspirations about inhabiting modernity.

Moreover, all these aspects were primarily recorded from the reformist perspective of the elite upper class. According to Rajasekharan, the Malayalam novel was a medium in which, since its inception, efforts by the society at defining its Malayali identity is discernible. He extends this argument further to define the notion of the blind God regarding the question of nexus between hegemony and writing. The early Malayalam novels, he argues, revolted against all hegemonies such as the government, patriarchy, merciless fate, aristocracy, and religion – which he equates to the “blind God” (p. 17). He explains the idea of the blind God thus: The novelists confronted the blind God of power in the light of the transforming society and the search for new narrative models. Aristocracy, the all-powerful patriarch, brutal feudalism and capitalism, the omnipresent narrator, the selffashioned individual, these were the various forms in which the God-symbol made itself present in the novel. It is a totem of power in various realms of society. (p. 18- 19) This notion of the blind God is visible in most novels of the period. Such a perception of the nexus of power enables to centrally address and engage with the questions of caste, class and gender in the novels.

== Research and findings ==
Rajasekharan and fellow critic P. Venugopalan found that the version of Indulekha, published in 1889 as the first Malayalam novel, Keralites have read for the past several decades was a heavily edited version. The novel, which strongly pushed for women's empowerment, was deeply altered with many such portions removed by later publishers. The last chapter, Chapter 20, was especially edited. They then found the original version of the novel, from the British Library in London, after several years of searching. In 2016 Rajasekharan and Venugopalan published a definitive variorum edition of Indulekha with notes and a critical Introduction.

== Awards ==
- Kerala Sahitya Academy Award (1997), for Literary Criticism, for the book Pitrukhadikaaram, O.V. Vijayan kalayum darshanavum
- Vilasini Award (instituted by Kerala Sahitya Academy) (2000), for the book "Andhanaya Daivam: Malayala Novelinte Nooru Varshangal"
- Thoppil Ravi award (2000), for the book "Andhanaya Daivam"
- State Bank of Travencore Literary Award for criticism (2009), for the book Vaakkinte Moonnaam Kara
- Narendra Prasad Award for criticism (2009), for the book Ekantha Nagarangal
- Panthalam Kerala Varma Media Award (2011) for the best editorial in Malayalam News Papers, for the editorial titled "Malayalam Nammude Abhimanamakanam" (Malayalam should be our pride), written in Mathrubhumi News Paper.
- C.B. Kumar Endowment, instituted by Kerala Sahitya Academy, for studies on P. Kunhiraman Nair's poetry.
- Dr. K. Godavarma Memorial Price (1988), instituted for the highest marks scorer in Malayalam M.A. from Kerala University.

== Bibliography ==
- Pathu Novelistukal (Kerala State Bala Sahitya Institute, 1990)
- Pitrukhadikaaram: O.V. Vijayante Kalayum Darshanavum (D.C. Books, Kottayam, 1994) ISBN 81-7130-374-9
- Andhanaya Daivam: Malayala Novelinte Nooru Varshangal (D.C. Books, Kottayam, 1999) ISBN 81-7130-961-5
- Madhyama Nighantu (D.C. Books, Kottayam, 2003)
- Ekantha Nagarangal: Utharadhunika Malayalathinte Saundarya Sasthram (D.C. Books, Kottayam, 2006) ISBN 8126412909
- Vakkinte Moonnamkara: Loka Novalile Sancharangal (D.C. Books, Kottayam, 2008) ISBN 978-81-264-2102-2
- Nishasandarshanangal: Lokasahithyathile Sancharangal (Rainbow book publications, Chengannur, 2008) ISBN 81-89716-69-7
- Kathantharangal: Malayala Cherukathayude Akhyana Bhoopadam (Mathrubhumi Books, Kozhikode, 2010) ISBN 81-8264-438-0
- Narakathinte Bhoopadangal: Loka Novalile Sancharangal (Mathrubhumi Books, Kozhikode, 2010) ISBN 978-81-8264-966-8
- Bookstalgia (Mathrubhumi Books, Kozhikode, July 2015) ISBN 978-81-8266-446-3
- Malayaliyude Madhyama Jeevitham(Kerala Bhasha Institute, Thiruvananthapuram, 2019) ISBN 978-81-200-4685-6
- Cinema sandarbhangal:Movie Theatre and the Public Sphere of Kerala (D.C. Books, Kottayam,2019) ISBN 978-93-89445-59-6
- Paschatya Sahitya Sidhantam (University of calicut Press, Kozhikode.2021) ISBN 978-81-947380-9-1

== Pictures ==
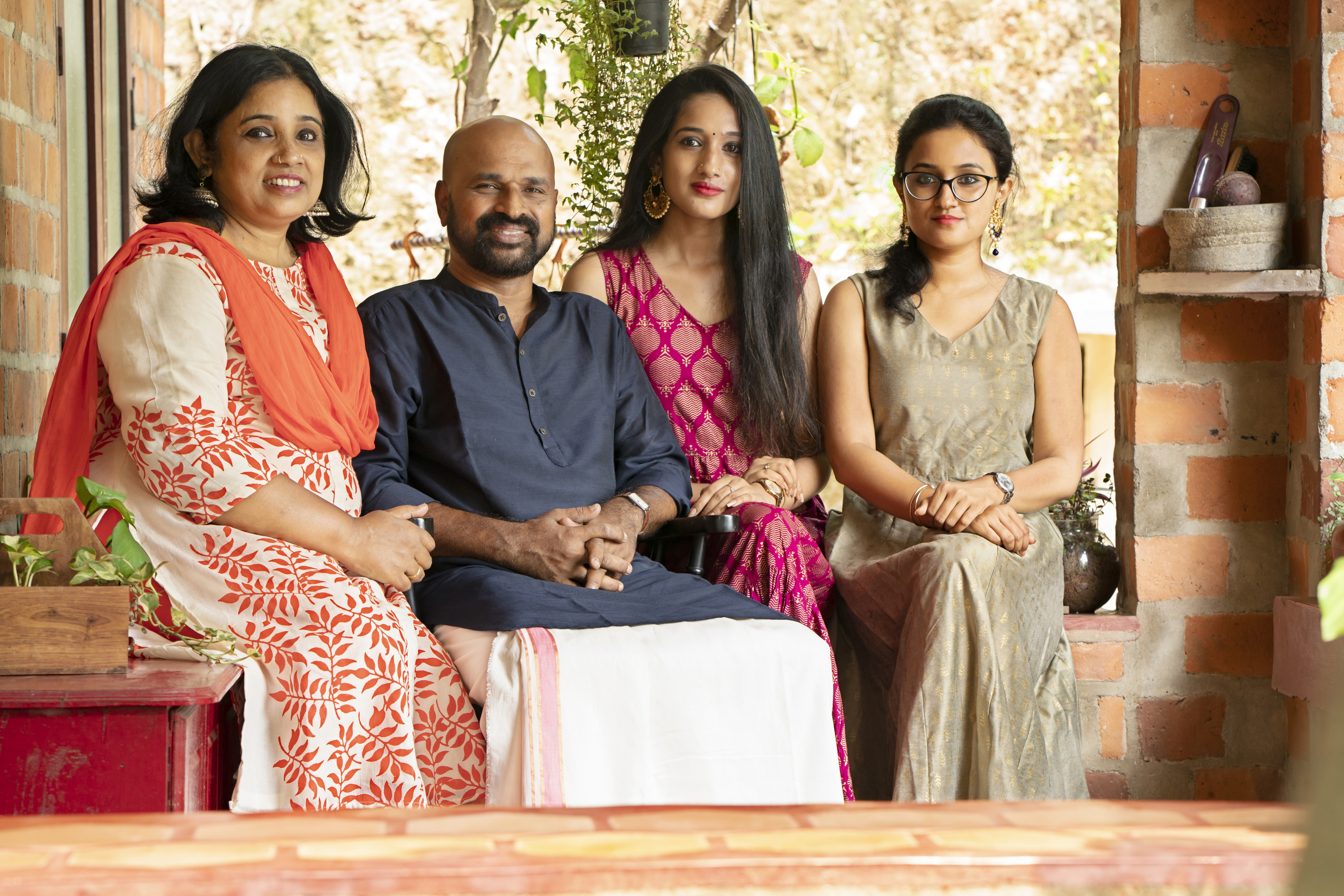
With family members

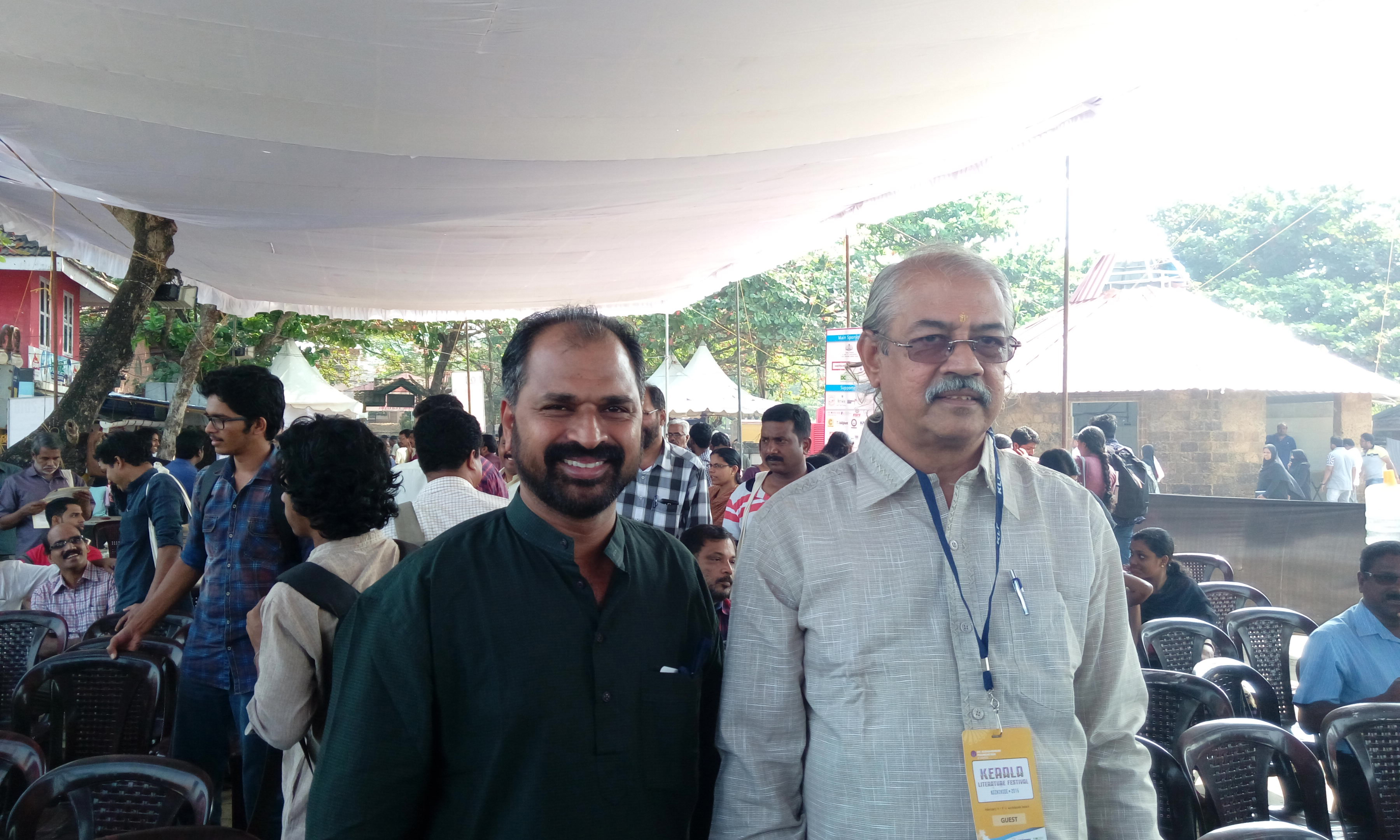
With Asha Menon

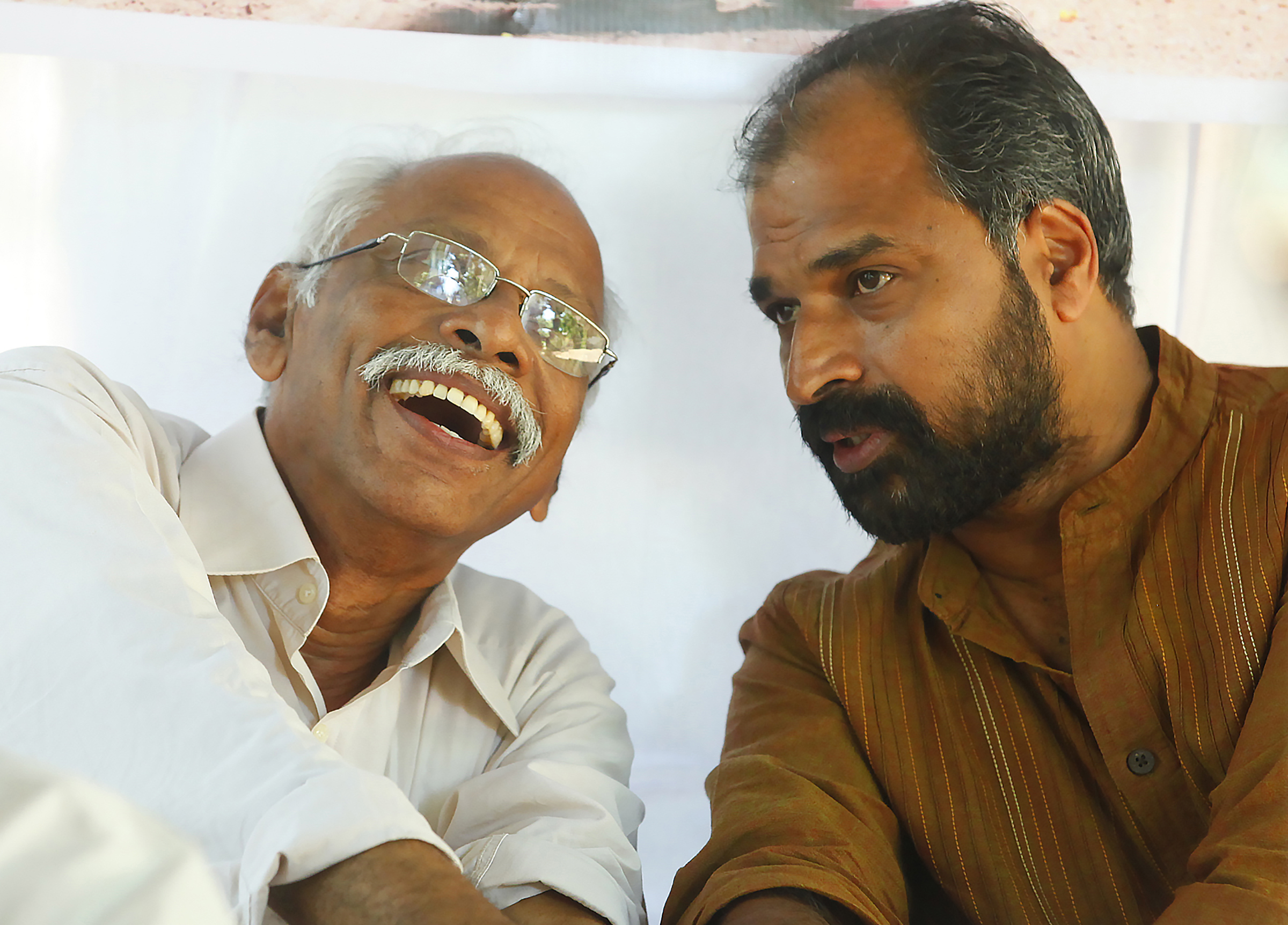
with M N Karasseri

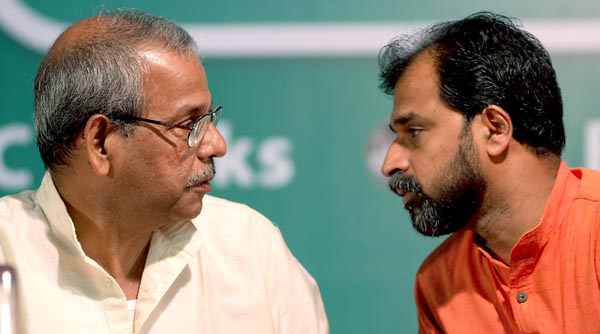
with C. Radhakrishnan

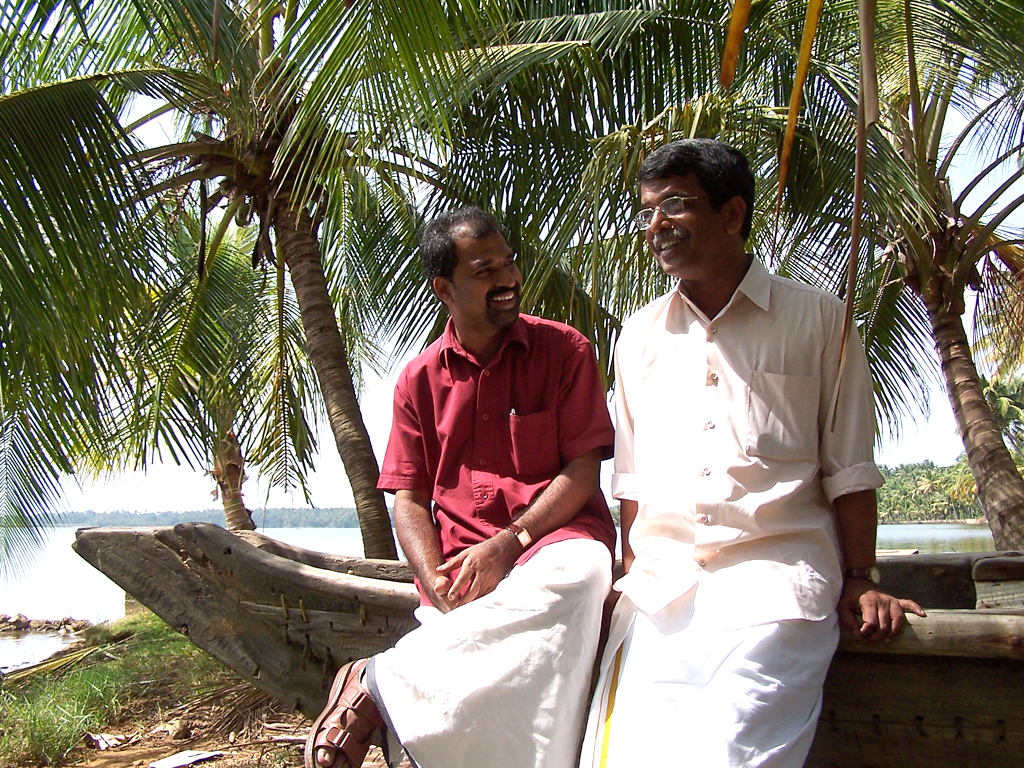
with V C Sreejan

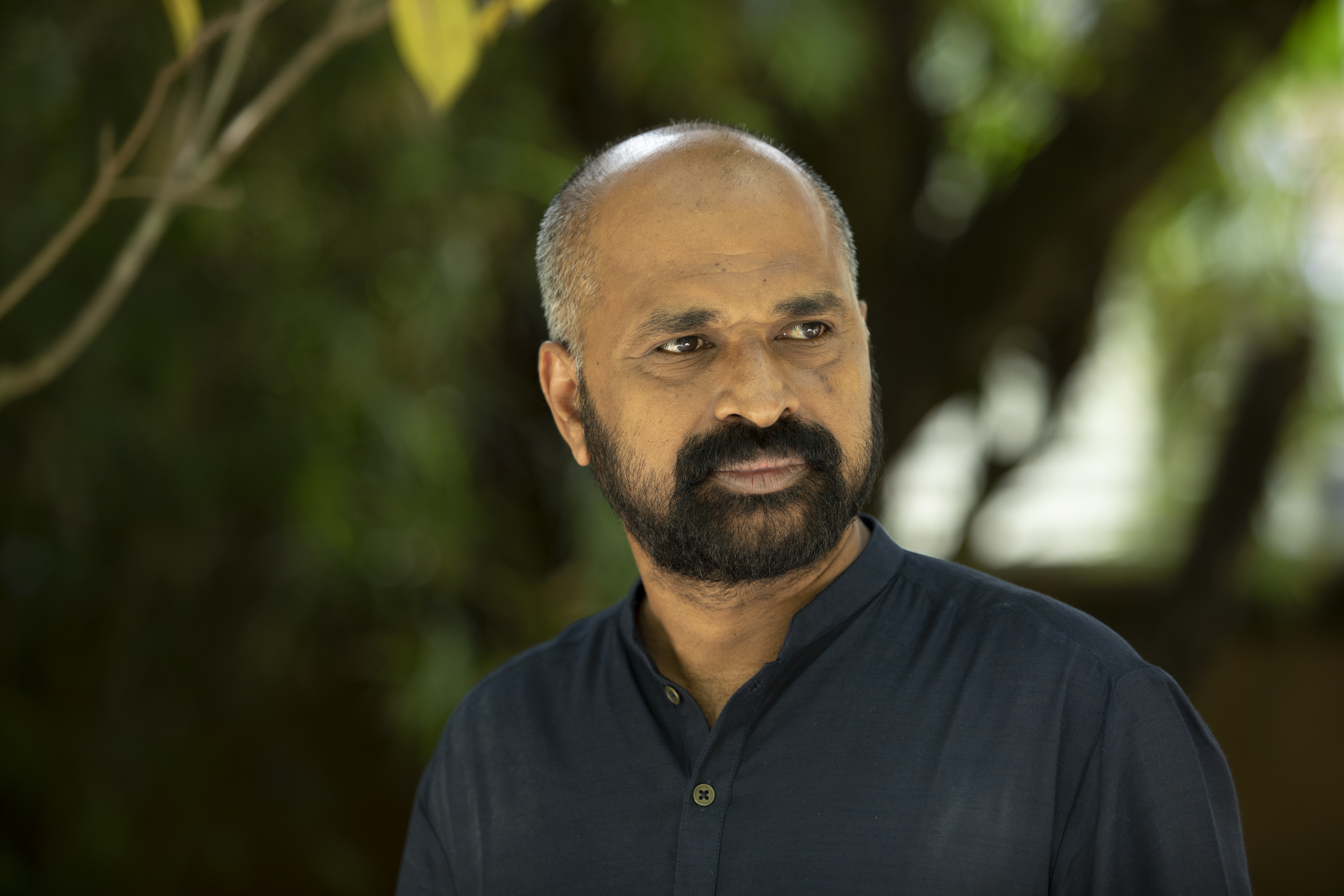

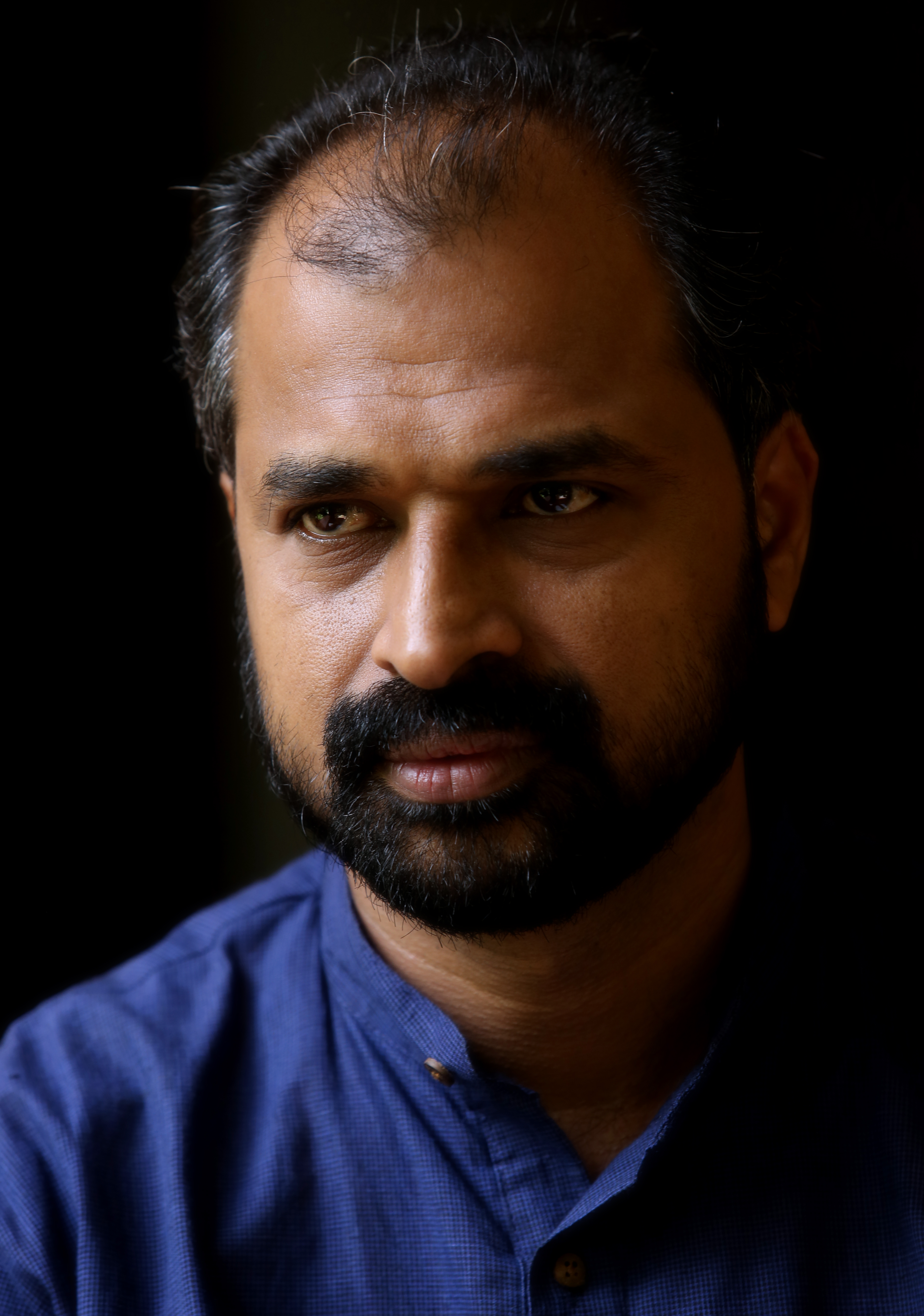

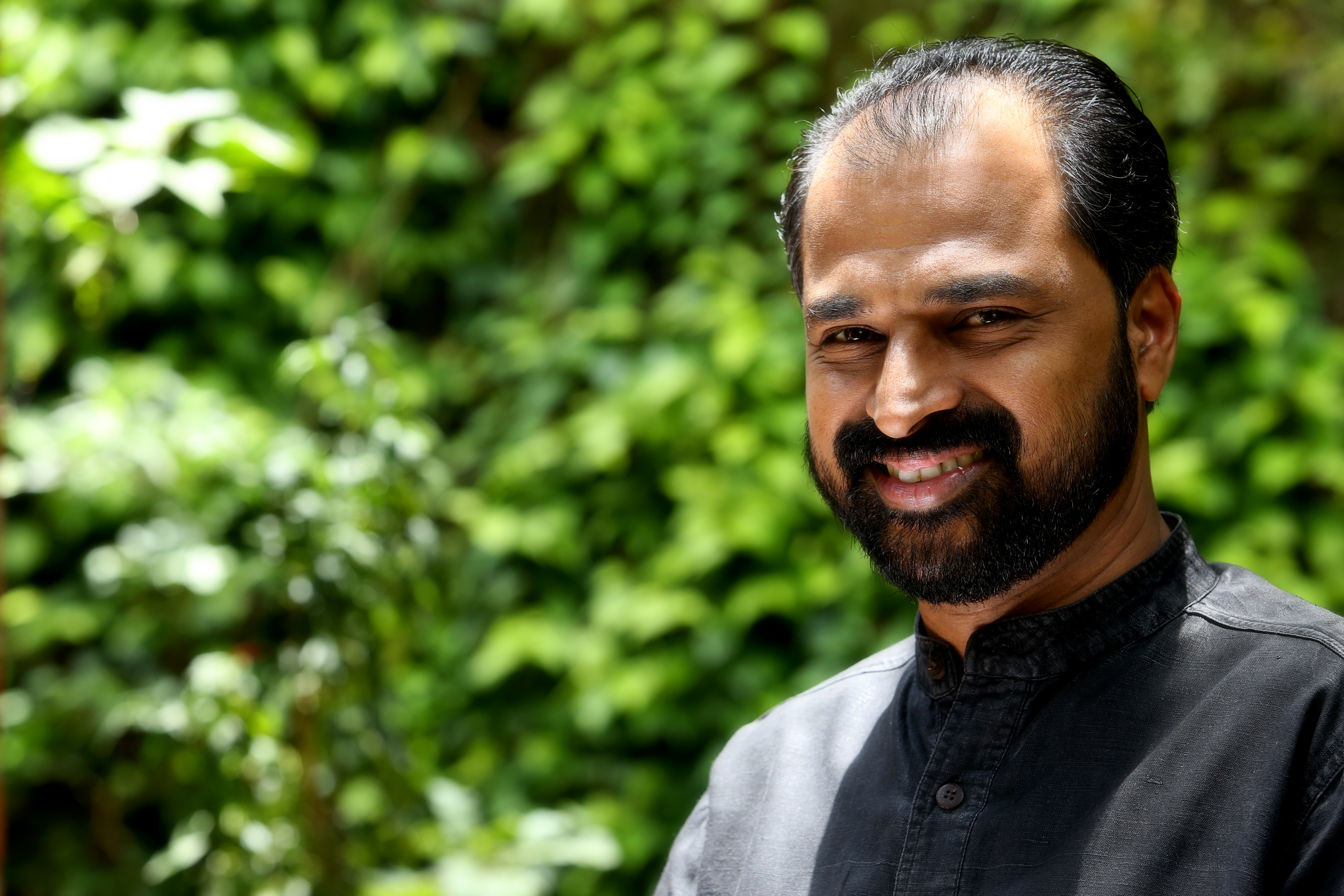

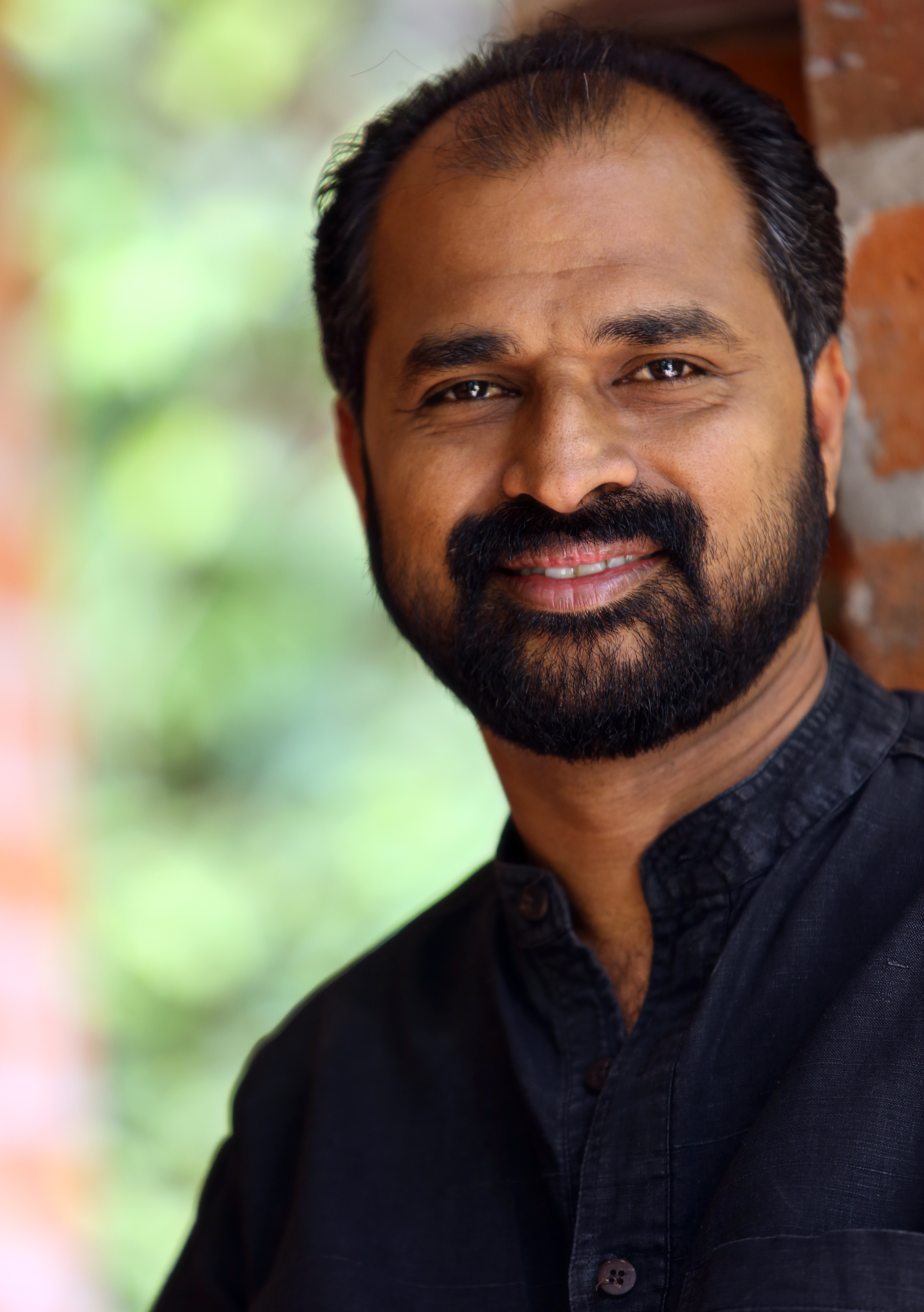
