= S. K. Pottekkatt =

Indian writer and traveler

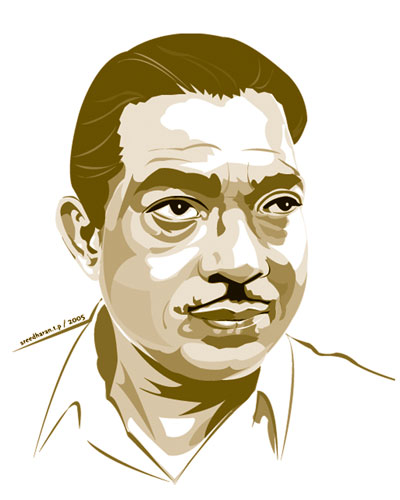
- Born: 14 March 1913; Calicut, Madras Presidency, British India
- Died: 6 August 1982 (aged 69); Calicut, Kerala, India
- Occupations: Teacher; writer; politician
- Spouse: Jayavalli (m. 1950)
- Children: 4
- Relatives: Kunjiraman (father); Kittuli (mother)
- Writing career
- Genres: Novel, travelogue, short story, plays, essay, poetry
- Notable works: Oru Desathinte Katha; Oru Theruvinte Katha; Naadan Premam
- Notable awards: 1961 Kerala Sahitya Akademi Award for Novel; 1972 Sahitya Akademi Award; 1980 Jnanpith Award

Sankarankutty Kunjiraman Pottekkatt (14 March 1913 – 6 August 1982) was an Indian writer of Malayalam literature, traveller, and politician from Kerala. Best known for his travelogues, he has authored nearly 60 books, which include 10 novels, 24 collections of short stories, three anthologies of poems, 18 travelogues, four plays, a collection of essays and a couple of books based on personal reminiscences.

He is a recipient of the Kerala Sahitya Akademi Award for Novel, Sahitya Akademi Award, and the Jnanpith Award. His works have been translated into English, Italian, Russian, German and Czech, besides all major Indian languages.

== Early life ==
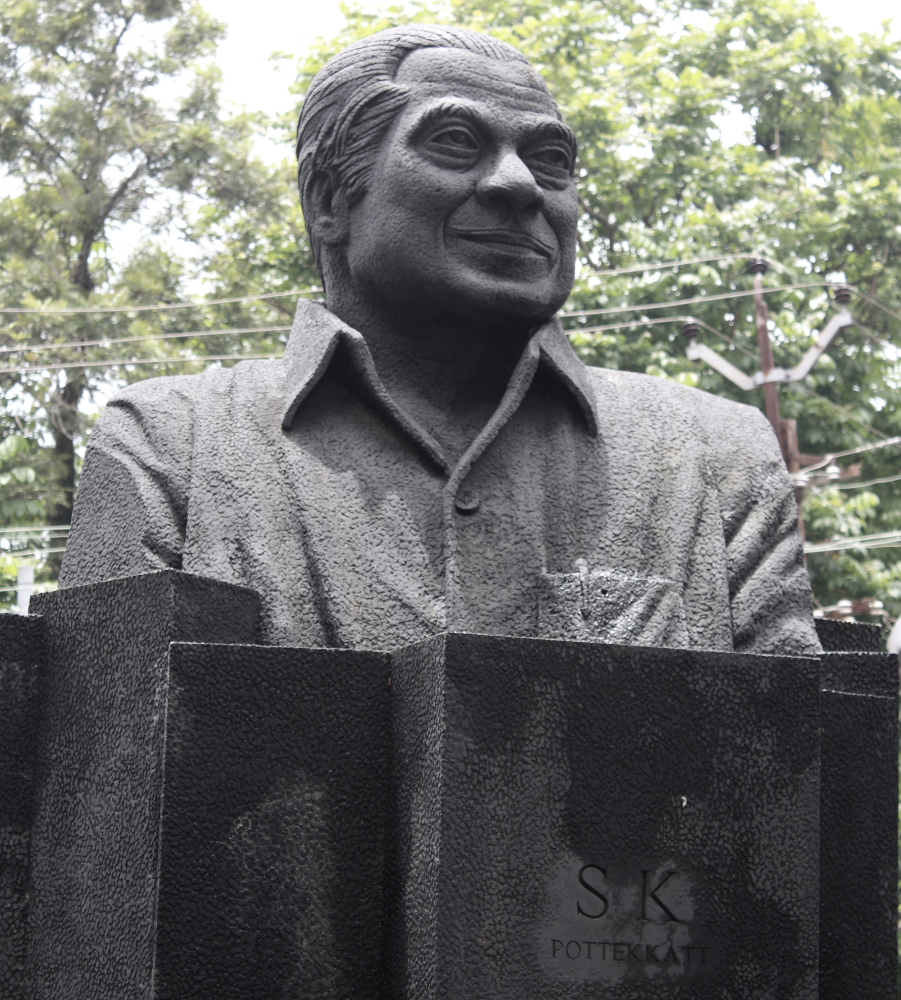
A bust of Pottekkatt facing S. M. Street in Kozhikode (Calicut).

S. K. Pottekkatt was born on 14 March 1913, in Calicut (Kozhikode) in a Thiyya family to Kunjiraman Pottekkat, an English school teacher and his wife, Kittuli. After early schooling at Ganapath School, he matriculated from Zamorin's High School in Calicut in 1929 and passed the intermediate examination from Zamorin's Guruvayurappan College, Calicut in 1934 but could not find a job for three years, a period which he utilised for studying classics from Indian and western literature. In 1937, he joined Calicut Gujarati School as a teacher where he taught for almost three years. He was involved with activities of the Indian National Congress and attended the Tripuri session of 1939 for which he resigned from the job as the school authorities did not allow him leave of absence. Subsequently, he moved to Bombay and Lucknow where he stayed until 1945, doing many jobs.

After returning to Kerala in 1945, he travelled to many parts of India and went on his first overseas tour in 1949 when he visited Africa, Switzerland, Italy, Germany, France and England. In 1952, he again went overseas to visit Ceylon, Malaya, and Indonesia.

== Literary career and travels ==
Pottekkatt published his first story, "Rajaneethi", in the college magazine of Zamorin's Guruvayurappan College in 1928. "Makane Konna Madyam" (poem published in Athmavidya Kahalam) and "Hindu Muslim Maithri" (story published in Deepam) were some of his notable early works. The story "Vydyutha Shakthi" came in the February 1934 issue of Mathrubhumi Illustrated Weekly. He wrote his first novel, Naadanpremam, a romantic story set in Mukkam, a small hamlet in Kozhikode district, in 1939 while he was in Bombay and the novel was eventually published in 1941. This was followed by Yavanikakku Pinnil, a short story anthology, and the second novel Vishakanyaka; the latter would receive a prize from the Madras government in 1949. Two travelogues were the next two publications, Kappirikalude Naattil (In the Land of the Negroes) and Innathe Europe (The Europe Today), both based on his first overseas tour. He published Oru Theruvinte Katha in 1960 and his magnum opus, Oru Desathinte Katha, in 1971.

Pottekkatt was a writer of strong social commitment and ideals, possessing an individualistic vision. He is reported to be the pioneer of the genre of travelogues in India and its most notable practitioner in Malayalam literature which earned him the moniker, the John Gunther of Malayalam. Poetry anthologies like Sanchariyude Geethangal and Premashilpi, Achan (play), novels like Premashiksha and Moodupadam, short story anthologies such as Nishagandhi, Pulliman and Chandrakatham, travelogues viz. Simhabhoomi, Nile Diary and Pathira Sooryante Nattil as well as memoirs like Ponthakkadukal and Samsarikkunna Diarykurippukal are some of his other major works.

His works have been translated into English, Italian, Russian, German and Czech, besides all major Indian languages. An Italian anthology of The Best Short Stories of the World published from Milan in 1971 included his Braanthan Naaya (Mad Dog). A collection of eleven of his short stories in Russian had a sensational sales of one hundred thousand copies in two weeks. His stories have made into feature films in Malayalam; Naadan Premam, Moodupadam, Pulliman and Njavalppazhangal are some of them. Kadavu, a 1991 film written directed by M. T. Vasudevan Nair based on his short story "Kadathuthoni", received prizes at several international film festivals. The 2015 film Manikyam was an adaptation of the novel Prema Shiksha.

== Political career ==
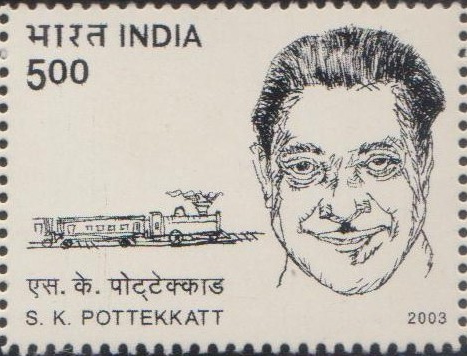
Pottekkatt on a 2003 India Post stamp

Pottekkatt contested twice as independent candidate in elections to Indian Parliament from Thalassery under the banner of the Communist Party of India, the first in 1957 to the 2nd Lok Sabha when he lost to M. K. Jinachandran by 1000 votes and the next in 1962 to the 3rd Lok Sabha when he defeated Sukumar Azhikode by a margin of 66,000 votes; he served out his term until 1967.

== Personal life ==
Pottekkatt married Jayavalli in 1950 and the couple had two sons and two daughters. His wife died in 1980 and two years later, he suffered a paralytic stroke in July 1982, and he died on 6 August 1982, in a private hospital in Calicut.

== Awards and honours ==
Oru Theruvinte Katha (The Story of a Street), a novel based on Mittai Theruvu, a popular street in Kozhikode known for sweetmeat and halvah stalls, received the Kerala Sahitya Akademi Award for Novel in 1961. His biographical novel, Oru Desathinte Katha was selected for the Sahitya Akademi Award in 1972. Eight years later, in 1980, the novel earned Pottekkatt the Jnanpith Award, the highest literary honour in India. In 1982, the University of Calicut honoured him with the honoris causa degree of the Doctor of Letters. India Post issued a commemorative postal stamp on him in 2003, as a part of their Jnanpith Award Winners. Malayala Manorama and Madhyamam issued festschrifts on Pottekkatt on the occasion of his birth centenary.

== Bibliography ==
=== Novels ===
Year	Title	Publisher	Notes	Ref.
1937	Vallikadevi			
1941	Naadan Premam	Calicut: Mathrubhumi		
1945	Prema Shiksha	Calicut: P. K. Brothers		
1948	Moodupadam	Calicut: Mathrubhumi		
1948	Vishakanyaka	Kottayam: S.P.C.S.		
1958	Karamboo	Calicut: Kerala		
1960	Oru Theruvinte Katha	Kottayam: S.P.C.S.	Kerala Sahitya Akademi Award for Novel	
1971	Oru Desathinte Katha	Kottayam: S.P.C.S.	Jnanpith Award, Sahitya Akademi Award	
1976	Kurumulaku	Kottayam: S.P.C.S.		
1979	Kabeena	Trivandrum: Upasana	ISBN 9788182656215	
1988	Bharathappuzhayude Makkal	Kottayam: S.P.C.S.	Described as Novatakam, a combination of novel and play	
—	North Avenue	—	Incomplete work	

=== Short stories ===
Year	Title	Publisher	Notes	Ref.
1945	Manimalika	Thrissur: Mangalodayam	Collection of 5 stories	
1945	Rajamalli	Kottayam: S.P.C.S.	Collection of 13 stories	
1945	Nisshagandhi	Thrissur: Mangalodayam	Collection of 9 stories	
1945	Pulliman	Thrissur: Sundarayyar & Sons	Collection of 6 stories	
1945	Meghamala	Kottayam: S.P.C.S.	Collection of 8 stories	
1946	Chandrakantham	Wadakkancherry: Arunodayam	Collection of 5 stories	
1946	Jalatharangam	Calicut: P. K. Brothers	Collection of 7 stories	
1946	Vaijayanthi	Thrissur: Mangalodayam	Collection of 7 stories	
1947	Pournami	Calicut: P. K. Brothers	Collection of 5 stories ISBN 9788130006345	
1947	Padmaragam	Kottayam: S.P.C.S.	Collection of 6 stories	
1947	Indraneelam	Calicut: K. R. Brothers	Collection of 6 stories	
1948	Rangamandapam	Thrissur: Mangalodayam	Collection of 7 stories	
1948	Himavahini	Thrissur: Mangalodayam	Collection of 5 stories	
1949	Prethabhoomi	Calicut: K. R. Brothers	Collection of 5 stories	
1952	Yavanikkakku Pinnil	Calicut: P. K. Brothers	Collection of 6 stories and a radio drama	
1954	Kallippookkal	Thrissur: Mangalodayam	Collection of 6 stories and a radio drama	
1954	Vanakaumudi	Thrissur: Mangalodayam	Collection of 4 stories and a radio drama	
1955	Kanakaambaram	Calicut: P. K. Brothers	Collection of 7 stories	
1960	Antharvahini	Calicut: Kerala	Collection of 5 stories ISBN 9788182654877	
1962	Ezhilam Pala	Kottayam: S.P.C.S.	Collection of 7 stories	
1967	Thiranjedutha Kathakal	Kottayam: S.P.C.S.	Collection of 36 stories; With an introduction by M. R. Chandrasekharan	
1968	Vrindavanam	Calicut: Poorna	Collection of 8 stories	
1970	Kattuchembakam			
1978	S. K. Pottekkattinte Cherukathakal	Calicut: Jaya		
1981	S. K. Pottekkattinte Cherukathakal	Calicut: Mathrubhumi		
1999	Katha: Pottekkatt			
2004	Sthree	Calicut: Mathrubhumi	ISBN 9788182640948	
2006	S. K. Pottekkattinte Kathakal Sampoornam	Calicut: Poorna	Complete short stories in three volumes	
2010	Ottakavum Mattu Pradhana Kathakalum	Kottayam: DC Books		
2014	S. K. Pottekkattinte Kathakal Sampoornam	Kottayam: DC Books	Complete short stories in two volumes ISBN 9788126440184	
2014	Sthree: Sthreekale Kurichu Kure Kathakal	Calicut: Poorna	ISBN 9788130018003	

=== Travelogues ===
Year	Title	Publisher	Notes	Ref.
1947	Kashmir	Thrissur: Mangalodayam		
1948	Yathrasmaranakal	Calicut: P. K. Brothers	Based on the journeys to historical places in India	
1951	Kappirikalude Nattil	Thrissur: Mangalodayam	ISBN 9788171307937	
1954	Simhabhoomi	Calicut: K. R. Brothers	1949 journey to Bagamoyo, Tanga, Kenya and Uganda	
1954	Nile Diary	Thrissur: Mangalodayam	ISBN 9788171803149	
1954	Malaya Nadukalil	Thrissur: Mangalodayam		
1955	Innathe Europe	Kottayam: S.P.C.S.	1950 journey to Europe and Britain; Later editions titled Europiloode; ISBN 9788126403547	
1955	Indonesian Diary	Kottayam: S.P.C.S.	1953 journey to Indonesia; originally published in two volumes; combined volume first published by S.P.C.S. in 1964	
1955	Soviet Diary	Thrissur: Mangalodayam		
1956	Pathira Sooryante Nattil	Calicut: P. K. Brothers	1955 journey to Finland	
1958	Bali Dweep	Kottayam: S.P.C.S.	1953 journey to Bali; ISBN 9788171309047	
1959	Simhabhoomi	Cochin: Parishath	Expanded version of the 1954 book and published in two volumes; combined volume first published by S.P.C.S. in 1968	
1960	Bohemian Chithrangal	Thrissur: Current Books		
1967	Himalaya Samrajyathil	Thrissur: Mangalodayam	Based on the journey to Haridwar and Badrinath in May 1966; ISBN 9788171803576	
1969	Nepal Yathra	Kottayam: S.P.C.S.		
1970	London Notebook	Kottayam: S.P.C.S.		
1974	Cairo Kathukal	Kottayam: S.P.C.S.		
1976	Sanchara Sahithyam: Vol. 1 – Africa	Irinjalakuda: Vivekodayam	Kappirikalude Nattil, Simhabhoomi, Nile Diary, Cairo Kathukal, Cleopatrayude Nattil	
1977	Sanchara Sahithyam: Vol. 2 – Europe	Irinjalakuda: Vivekodayam	Europiloode (Innathe Europe), London Notebook, Pathira Sooryante Nattil, Soviet Diary, Bohemian Chithrangal	
1977	Sanchara Sahithyam: Vol. 3 – Asia	Irinjalakuda: Vivekodayam	Yathrasmaranakal, Kashmir, Himalaya Samrajyathil, Nepal Yathra, Malaya Nadukalil, Indonesian Diary, Bali Dweep	
1977	Cleopatrayude Nattil	Irinjalakuda: Vivekodayam		

=== Poetry ===
Year	Title	Publisher	Notes	Ref.
1936	Prabhatha Kanthi	Calicut: K. R. Brothers	14 poems	
1946	Sanchariyude Geethangal	Calicut: P. K. Brothers	14 poems; with an introduction by G. Sankara Kurup	
1958	Prema Shilpi	Thrissur: Current Books	5 poems	
2015	S. K. Pottekkattinte Kavithakal	Calicut: Lipi	ISBN 9788188017935	

=== Drama ===
Year	Title	Publisher	Notes	Ref.
1945	Achan	Alleppey: T. K. Varghese Vaidyan		
1948	Achanum Makanum	—	Included in Himavahini	
1954	Althara	—	A radio play included in Vanakaumudi	
1954	Theevandi Odunnu	—	A radio play included in Kallipookkal	

=== Others ===
Year	Title	Publisher	Notes	Ref.
1947	Ponthakkadukal	Calicut: Mathrubhumi	Collection of humour essays published in various newspapers and magazines under the name Arunan; ISBN 9788182656239	
1949	Gadhyamekhala	Calicut: P. K. Brothers	Collection of 8 essays	
1975	Ente Vazhiyambalangal	Kottayam: N.B.S.	Memoirs	
1978	Muhammed Abdurahiman	Calicut: Mathrubhumi	Political biography of Muhammed Abdurahiman; Co-authored with P. P. Ummer Koya, N. P. Mohammed and K. A. Kodungallur	
1981	Samsarikkunna Diarykurrippukal	Calicut: Mathrubhumi	Diary	
1995	Pottekkattinte Kathukal	Calicut: P. K. Brothers	Letters	
2013	Paryadanam	Calicut: Mathrubhumi	Diary	

=== Translations into other languages ===
- Stree Thatha Anya Kahaniyam (in Hindi). 1986.
- Kadha Ek Pranthar Ki (in Hindi). Bharatheey Njanpeet Prakasan. 1981.
- Tales of Athiranippadam. Hyderabad: Orient Blackswan. 2013. ISBN 9788125051275.
- Twelve stories. Calicut: Tarjuma. 2010. ISBN 9788190895811.
- Many works are translated to Tamil by Su Ra.

=== Films ===
- Moodupadam (1963) (based on the novel Moodupadam)
- Naadan Premam (1972) (based on the novel Naadan Premam)
- Pulliman (1972) (based on the story "Pulliman")
- Njavalppazhangal (1976) (based on the story "Njavalppazhangal")
- Ottakam (1978) (based on the story "Ottakam")
- Thaala (1988)
- Kadavu (1991) (based on the story "Kadathuthoni")
- Manikyam (2015) (based on the novel Prema Shiksha)
