= Oyyarathu Chandu Menon =

Indian writer

Rao Bahadur O. Chandu Menon
- Born: 9 January 1847; Naduvannur, Malabar District, British India (now Kozhikode district, Kerala, India)
- Died: 7 September 1899 (aged 52); Tellicherry, Cannanore
- Other name: Oyyarath Chandu Menon
- Occupations: Writer, novelist, social reformer
- Spouse: Lakshmikutty Amma
- Parent(s): Chandu Nair Edappadi, Parvathy Amma Chittezhath
- Awards: Rao Bahadur

Oyyarathu Chandu Menon (popularly known as O. Chandu Menon; 1847–1899) was a Malayalam language novelist. He is the author of Indulekha, the first major novel in Malayalam, published in 1889.

== Life ==
Chandu Menon was born on 9 January 1847 in Naduvannur near Perambra in the present day Kozhikode District. His family moved to Thalassery when he was an infant.

Chandu Menon got his first lessons from Koran Gurukkal, one of his neighbors. He learnt Sanskrit poetry, drama and grammar from Pandit Kunjanbu Nambiar. About the same time, he received English lessons from a local school and later from K. Kunjan Menon. He had higher school education in the Basel Evangelical Mission Parsi High School in Thalassery. While studying there he is reported to have qualified for the uncovenanted Civil Service by securing a high rank in the test for that Service. In 1857, his 52 year old father died due to diabetes. In 1864 his mother died when he was in the matriculation class and he was forced to abandon studies.

Chandu Menon married Lakshmikutty Amma in 1872. The couple had six children.

Chandu Menon started his career as a clerk in the government service. William Logan, author of the Malabar Manual appointed him as a clerk at Sub-Collector's office. After working in various offices in Malabar, he slowly rose to the position of a Munsiff, and in 1892 became the sub-judge of Calicut. As per a record available, he was also District judge of Mangalore in 1895. Chandu Menon reportedly assisted Willam Logan in the preparation of Malabar Manual.

Chandu Menon was also a social reformer. He was a member of the committee constituted to inquire on Marumakkathayam and report on the Malabar Marriages Bill. His observations on matrimony among Nairs that prevailed during the time are of historical importance. He was given the title of Rao Bahadur in 1898 for excellent service. Chandu Menon died on 7 September 1899 at his Oyyarath residence in Thalassery due to cardiac failure.

== Literary career ==
He was inspired by his wife to write his first novel Indulekha. He attempted to fashion the work after the English novels popular during those days and depicted the love and life of an upper-caste woman and her destiny. The novel attempted to discuss the topics of feudalism, polygamy and caste oppression.

His 1889 work, Indulekha, was the first Malayalam fictional work which met with all the requisite characteristics of a novel according to widely accepted Malayalam literary convention. It is not the first novel per se, as Kundalatha (a much inferior work) by Appu Nedungadi pre-dates it by two years. Indulekha throws light on the Nair community during the second half of the nineteenth century when it was undergoing a transformation following western influences and English education. It exalts education and satirizes the orthodox practices of marital alliances between Nair women and Namboodiri men. Indulekha was translated into English 1891 by the-then Collector of Malabar district. Indulekha is claimed to be the only Malayalam novel to be reprinted every year for over hundred years.

He began a second novel named Sarada, the first part of which appeared in 1892. This novel was meant to be in two parts. However, he was unable to complete the sequel, which never got published.

Two English speeches made by Chandu Menon, one on Administration of Justice in Ancient Times and another under the auspices of the Sir T. Muthuswamy Iyer Memorial Committee have been published in book form.

== Major awards and recognitions ==
- He reportedly received a letter from the prime minister of the United Kingdom, W. E. Gladstone, passing on Queen Victoria's appreciation of Chandu Menon's services to Malayalam literature in 1892.
- The Government of India conferred on him the title of Rao Bahadur in 1897.
- Madras University recognised his merits, appointed him as examiner for the law degrees in 1898.
- He was also honoured by Madras University by nominating him as a fellow of the university.
