= Sarada (novel) =

Book by Oyyarathu Chandu Menon

- Author: O Chandu Menon
- Language: Malayalam
- Genre: Fiction
- Publication date: 1892
- Publication place: India
- Media type: Print (Hardback)

Sarada (Malayalam: ശാരദ), a novel by O. Chandhu Menon, was published in 1892. Due to his death in 1899, Chandu Menon could not complete the second part of Sarada.
