= Kundalatha =

Book by Appu Nedungadi

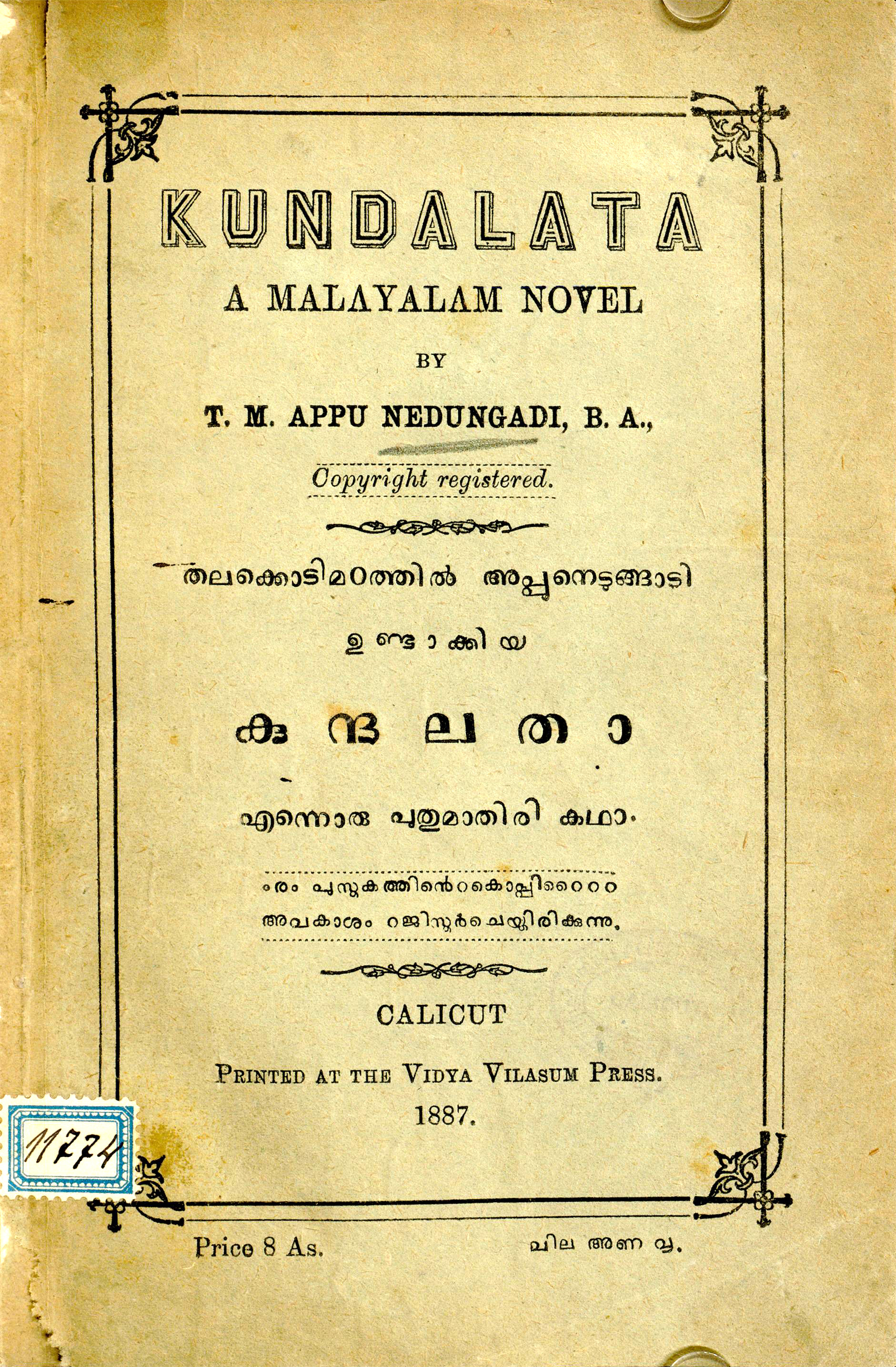
- Cover page of the first edition
- Author: Appu Nedungadi
- Original title: കുന്ദലതാ
- Language: Malayalam
- Genre: Fiction, Romance, Romance
- Publisher: Author
- Publication date: 1887
- Publication place: India
- Media type: Print (Paperback)
- Pages: 125
- Original text: കുന്ദലതാ at Malayalam Wikisource

Kundalatha (or Kundalata, Malayalam: കുന്ദലത) is a novel by Appu Nedungadi, published in 1887. It is considered to be the first Malayalam novel.

== See also ==
- Indulekha
