= Oru Desathinte Katha =

1971 novel

- Author: S. K. Pottekkatt
- Original title: ഒരു ദേശത്തിന്റെ കഥ
- Language: Malayalam
- Publisher: D. C. Books
- Publication date: 1971
- Publication place: India
- Pages: 566
- ISBN: 978-81-7130-570-4

Oru Desathinte Katha (English: The Story of a Locale) is a 1971 Malayalam novel written by S. K. Pottekkatt. It portrays the people of Athiranippadam, drawing on history while detailing the story of one place. It won the Kendra Sahitya Academy Award in 1972, and the Jnanpith Award in 1980. The story takes place over a span of about 55 years. It travels from Athiranippadam to North India to Africa and Switzerland.

== Plot ==
The story revolves around Sreedharan, a boy who was a resident of Athiranippadam. The story depicts the life of the villagers through his eyes and through the other characters. The novel is set in British India where the protagonist was born. The novel begins with Sreedharan's return to Athiranippadam some 40 + years after he had left. He is dropped off from a public transport near a petrol overhead tank that is situated on the plot where his teenage love's house once stood.

He tells the readers the life of dwellers of Athiranippadam. The novel is divided into five parts: childhood; early youth; teenage years; and a concluding part as "marmarangal". A story told by Velu Mooper, a witness after Sreedharan's father's demise and a long spell of his solo trips to North India, Africa, and Europe.

He meets several persons, who left deep impressions of variable human states of life on his memory. Emma of Switzerland, the Bengali Babu, his half brothers Kunhappu and Gopalettan (who made his life miserable by contracting syphilis), the mother goddess psyche of his Tamil Brahmin lady, who happens to be his one desire, the one-sided love of a girl who died of tuberculosis, Supper Circuit Set pranks, lost loves, severe solitude, his father's legendary life, and finally his long journey through different continents.

He started by dropping his widowed mother at her father's home, "at first to Elanhippoyil, to drop mother there, and then to Bombay, a solitary voyage, and from there to the vast bewildering world" as SKP's own words.

It is a haunting autobiographical novel, detailing some 60 years of history, offering history, nostalgia, plight, dreams, and finally, numbness. The novel ends with a monologue: "forgive me, the representative of the new generation of Athiranippadam, Forgive me for my trespass to your land, and consider me as just an antique collector, a non native person!"
