= Pulliman (1972 film) =

Pullimaan
- Poster
- Directed by: E. N. Balakrishnan
- Screenplay by: Thikkodiyan
- Story by: S. K. Pottakkad
- Produced by: Ponnappan
- Starring: Madhu; Devika; Vijayanirmala; Alummoodan
- Cinematography: E. N. Balakrishnan
- Edited by: M. S. Mani; Vaira Moorthi
- Music by: M. S. Baburaj
- Production company: Deepthi Films
- Release date: 12 May 1972
- Country: India
- Language: Malayalam

Pullimaan is a 1972 Indian Malayalam-language film, directed by E. N. Balakrishnan and produced by Ponnappan. The film stars Madhu, Devika, Vijayanirmala and Alummoodan. It is based on the short story of the same name by S. K. Pottakkad.

== Cast ==
- Madhu
- Devika
- Vijayanirmala
- Alummoodan
- Kaduvakulam Antony
- Kottarakkara Sreedharan Nair
- Master Raghu
- Philomina

== Soundtrack ==
The music was composed by M. S. Baburaj with lyrics by Sreekumaran Thampi.

Song	Singers
"Aayiram Varnangal"	S. Janaki
"Chandrabimbam"	K. J. Yesudas
"Kaaveri Kaaveri"	K. J. Yesudas
"Vaidoorya Rathnamaalachaarthi"	S. Janaki
"Veerajavaanmaar"	P. Susheela
