= Ini Njan Urangatte =

1973 novel by P. K. Balakrishnan

- Book cover
- Author: P. K. Balakrishnan
- Original title: ഇനി ഞാൻ ഉറങ്ങട്ടെ
- Language: Malayalam
- Genre: Novel
- Publisher: DC Books
- Publication date: 1973
- Pages: 216
- ISBN: 978-81-264-0452-0

Ini Njan Urangatte (And Now Let Me Sleep) is a Malayalam-language novel written by P. K. Balakrishnan in 1973. The novel's inspiration is the Sanskrit epic Mahabharata. It may be regarded as a historically notable Malayalam-language novel as it has become a yardstick for epic Malayalam fiction, spawning many Mahabharata based-novels.

The post-independence period in Malayalam literature saw a fresh start in the history of long-form fiction in Malayalam like in many other Indian languages, parallel to the evolution of post-world war fiction in other parts of the world. Attempts to retell Puranic episodes were common during this period. In Malayalam, this trend was set by P.K. Balakrishnan with his redaction of the Mahabharata from the viewpoint of Draupadi. It is a psychological study of Karna and Draupadi, set against the background of the main events in the Mahabharata.

The novel has been translated to English and different Indian languages. A second English translation titled Battle Beyond Kurukshetra is published by Oxford University Press. The book received the Kerala Sahitya Akademi Award in 1974, the Vayalar Award in 1978, as well as the Sahitya Pravarthaka Benefit Fund Award. A popular work in the language, various aspects of the novel have been widely studied.

== Brief of the Novel ==
The novel narrates the story of Karna, developed through the viewpoint of Draupadi in the reflection of her life. The book begins at the end of the Kurukshetra War. Yudhishthira has just learned that Karna, the much-hated enemy of the Pandavas, killed by Arjuna is his brother. Draupadi, the wife of all the Pandava brothers, is unable to understand her sense of guilt surrounding the situation. However, she soon learns more about the once-hated Karna. Draupadi's feelings towards Karna change through the course of the novel. As the wife of all the Pandava brothers, she comes to realize that had Karna accepted the offer to become the eldest Pandava and consented to rule the kingdom, he would have been her husband.

Draupadi considers life in retrospect, contemplating the life of Karna and unveiling his stature as a tragic hero. She recognizes that the gallant warrior, Karna, has fallen before the prejudices of those surrounding him. Karna becomes encompassed in an all-destructive war. Meanwhile, Draupadi, the chaste and dutiful wife of the Pandavas, also reflects on her understanding. She finds that the fundamentals and morals she had come to believe in life, crumbled before her own eyes. There is a sense of destruction and abandonment shared between these two characters. The book crafts a contemporary relevance to the tribulations of the tragic hero, Karna, and the struggles of the quintessential woman, Draupadi.

P.K. Balakrishnan tells the story of Karna through the eyes of a woman in his award-winning novel, Ini Njan Urangatte. This novel attracted the recognition of the Kerala Sahitya Akademi with the award in the novel category and the Vayalar Award.

== Translations ==
Title	Language	Translator	Year	Publisher
Battle Beyond Kurukshetra	English	Jayalekshmy P K	2017	Oxford University Press
And Now Let Me Sleep	English	Dr. K.C. Sarsamma	1999	Kendra Sahitya Akademi
Ini Njan Urangattum	Tamil	A. Madhavan	2001	Kendra Sahitya Akademi
Naninnu Nidrisuve	Kannada	Sara Aboobacker	2000	Kendra Sahitya Akademi
Ab Mujhe Sone Do	Hindi	G. Gopinathan	2016	Kendra Sahitya Akademi

== Awards ==
1. Kerala Sahitya Akademi award (1974)

2. Vayalar award (1978)

3. Sahitya Pravarthaka Benefit Fund award
