= Appu Nedungadi =

Indian writer (1863–1933)

Rao Bahadur Appu Nedungadi
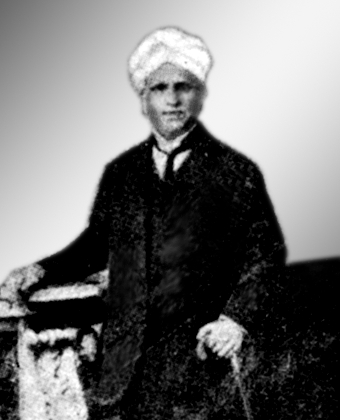
- Born: Appu Nedungadi Thalakodi Madathil; 11 October 1860; Kothakurissi, Ottapalam, British India (present-day Palakkad, Kerala, India)
- Died: 6 November 1933 (aged 70); Calicut, Malabar District, Madras Presidency, British India (present-day Kozhikode, Kerala, India)
- Occupations: Novelist; Banker
- Relatives: Tara Rajkumar, grand-niece
- Writing career
- Notable work: Kundalatha

Appu Nedungadi (11 October 1863 – 6 November 1933) was an Indian writer and banker best known as the author of Kundalatha, which was published in 1887, making it the first novel published in the Malayalam language. He was associated with several literary publications including Kerala Pathrika, Kerala Sanchari and Vidya Vinodini. In 1899, he established Nedungadi Bank, the oldest private sector commercial bank in Kozhikode, Kerala. The bank was incorporated in 1913 and was taken over by the Punjab National Bank in 2003.
