= 2006 Philippine Mount Everest expedition =

Filipino mountaineering expedition

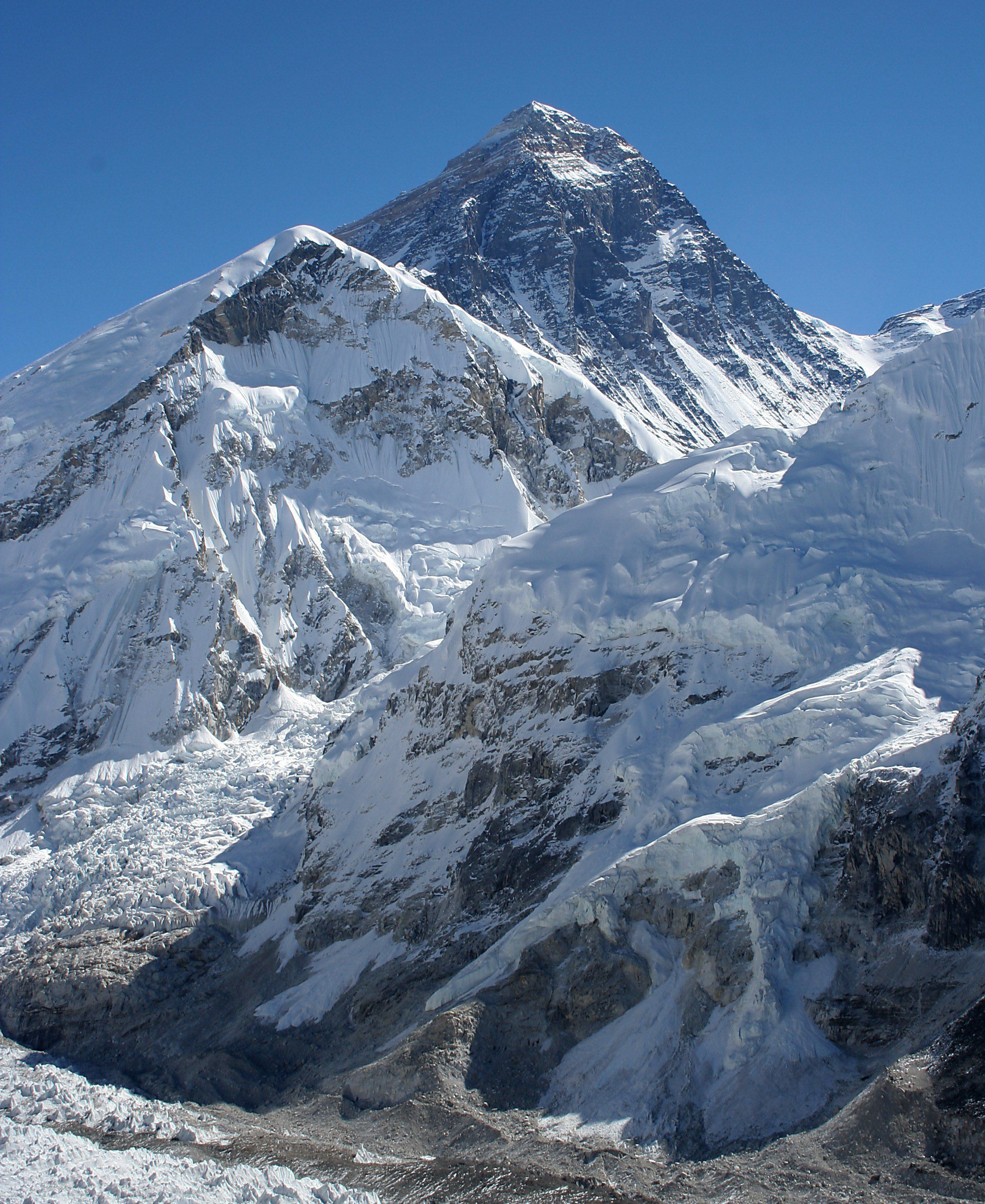
Mount Everest viewed from Kala Patthar

The 2006 Philippine Mount Everest expedition is a Filipino mountaineering expedition that made a successful attempt to reach the summit of Mount Everest via the traditional southeast ridge route in May 2006 during the spring climbing season in the Himalayas. It was the first national expedition organized by the Philippines to reach the summit of world's highest mountain.

One of the expedition members, Leo Oracion, became the first Filipino to reach the summit of Mount Everest and put the Philippine flag on top of the mountain on May 17, 2006, at 3:30 p.m. Nepal time. His fellow expedition member, Erwin "Pastour" Emata, became the second Filipino to reach the summit the following day, May 18, 2006.

== Background ==
Before 2006, only a few Southeast Asian countries have achieved the feat of organizing a national expedition to the summit of Mount Everest. In September 1996, an Indonesian woman, Clara Sumarwati, became the first Southeast Asian to reach the summit. In May 1997, Malaysian climber M. Magendran became the second Southeast Asian and first Malaysian on the summit. The following year, Singapore also made a successful bid to reach the summit.

In 2003, during the annual Mountaineering Federation of the Philippines Inc. (MFPI) Congress in Peñablanca, Cagayan, the First Philippine Mount Everest Expedition (FPMEE) was organized by former Transportation Undersecretary Arturo Valdez, then MFPI president Reggie Pablo, and MFPI members Butch Sebastian, Fred Jamili and John Tronco. A former MFPI president from 1974 to 1986, Valdez previously had plans to organize an all-Filipino expedition to Mount Everest as early as 1982, but this never progressed from the planning phase.

In a press conference on March 23, 2004, the group announced the establishment of the expedition and opened the application process to local mountaineers, athletes and sports enthusiasts. The original plan was to ascend Mount Everest during the summer climbing season in 2007, with two climbing teams ascending from the Tibetan side (north) and the Nepalese side (south), respectively, which will then meet at the summit before descending.

== Preparations ==
The group named Valdez as the expedition leader, with Jamili serving as deputy leader and Pablo as spokesperson. They also tapped Dr. Ted Esguerra of the Philippine Coast Guard's Medical Service as expedition doctor, being the only doctor in the country with experience in treating altitude sickness. Tronco was assigned as expedition photographer given his mountaineering and photography experience. Sebastian, along with fitness instructor and adventure racer Florentino "Jong" Narciso assisted in helping the climbers become physically fit and well-experienced in alpine climbing before the expedition began.

=== Selection process ===
A nationwide selection process commenced to determine who will be part of the expedition, with up to 29 individuals from Luzon, Visayas and Mindanao applying to be part of the two teams. The 29 applicants were:

- Bobby Acosta
- Ariel Ambayec
- Johnny Boy "JB" Añonuevo
- Theodore "Choi" Aquino
- Wendell Bamba
- Janet Belarmino
- Allan Cabizares
- Noy Caimoy
- Carina Dayondon
- Joel Del Sol
- Danny Dematera
- Nick Dimaampo
- Erwin "Pastour" Emata
- Chico Estrera
- Chris Eyao
- IT Gonzales
- Larry Honoridez
- Lito Manansala
- Bobby Mengito
- Levi Nayangahan
- Heradio "Leo" Oracion
- Surit Palena
- Wrendolph Pangamba
- Valerio Ramos, Jr.
- Mon Ruiz
- Goad Sibayan
- Rey Sumagaysay
- Bubut Tan-Torres
- Noelle Wenceslao

Aside from the 29 applicants, IT system analyst Romi Garduce, who has previously hiked up to the summit of Africa's tallest mountain, Mount Kilimanjaro at 5,895 metres (19,341 ft), was also invited to be part of the expedition. Given his job at a top multinational IT firm, which would make it difficult for him to commit to the preparations, Garduce ultimately declined the national team's invitation to join the expedition. He also stated in his blog that he preferred to climb alone or with a small group. Garduce eventually decided to organize his own expedition in 2005 and received financial support from TV network GMA 7, which had exclusive coverage rights to his climb.

=== Training ===
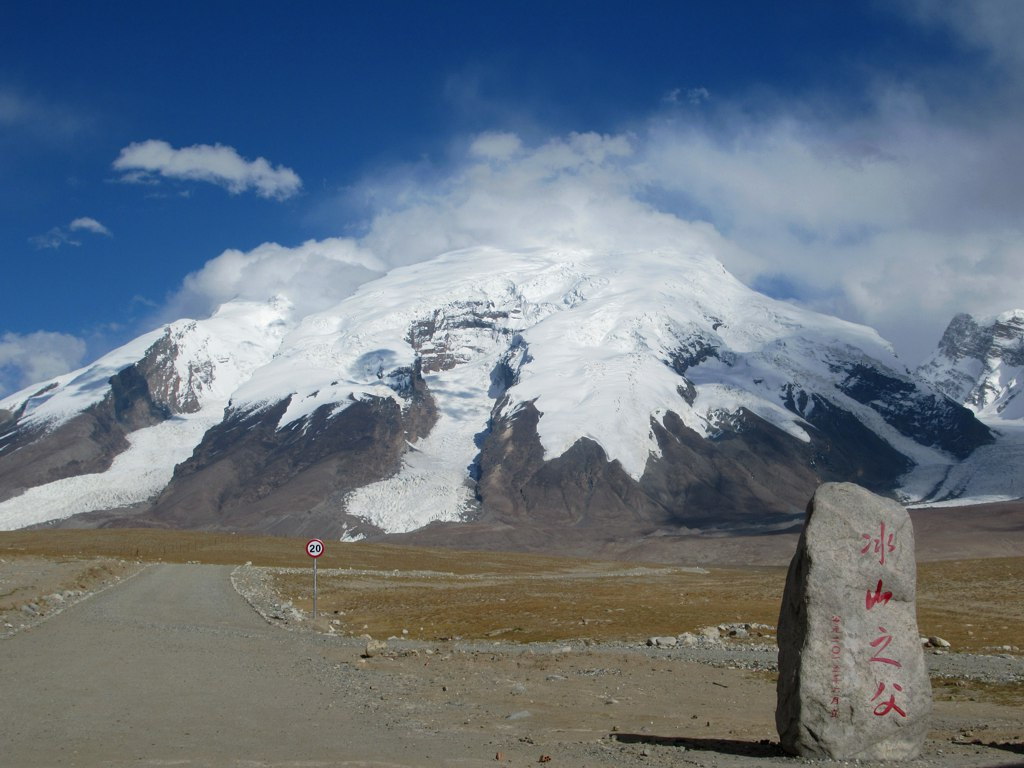
Mustagh Ata, the second highest mountain in the Pamir Range, which members of the First Philippine Mount Everest Expedition climbed in 2005 in preparation for their Everest ascent.

The expedition set a three-year preparation period to allow its members to gain experience and familiarize themselves in high-altitude alpine climbing. They adopted the training program designed by David Lim, leader of the First Singapore Mount Everest Expedition, albeit with some adjustments based on the team's schedule. During the course of the training, the 29 applicants were narrowed down based on mountaineering experience, capability, compatibility and commitment.

The group organized several minor climbing expeditions in the Philippines and abroad to prepare the 29 applicants, including treks in the country's 10 highest mountains. Because the highest mountains in the Philippines are below 3,000 m, the team also went to Sabah, Malaysia to climb to the summit of Mount Kinabalu (4,095 m) to gain high-altitude climbing experience.

The group also went to Manali, India to train in advanced mountaineering at the Western Himalayan Mountaineering Institute. During the training, they scaled the Baralacha Pass (4,890 m) near Manali and Kyorang Peak (6,300 m) in Ladakh.

In April 2005, the 10 remaining applicants — Añonuevo, Ambayec, Aquino, Belarmino, Dayondon, Emata, Honoridez, Oracion, Nayangahan, and Wenceslao — went with the team to New Zealand for a 10-day preparatory climb which involved summiting Mount Aylmer (2699 m) and Aoraki / Mount Cook (3,724 m) in the Southern Alps.

After New Zealand, the team along with Ambayec, Emata, Oracion, Nayangahan, Dayondon went to China's Xinjiang Region in August 2005 to climb Mustagh Ata (7,509 m), with Oracion and Emata being the first and second Filipinos to summit the mountain. They also broke the Philippine altitude record that Garduce set in January 2005 when he reached the summit of Aconcagua in Argentina. Ambayec suffered a mild stroke during the climb forcing the team to carry him back to base camp in a seven-hour trek.

=== Support ===
To raise funds for training and the expedition, the FPMEE was registered as a company and solicited support from various Filipino companies and brands. The group initially had difficulty securing funding given that only few Filipinos at the time have experience in high-altitude alpine climbing. The group's training program in India was funded through a loan that Sebastian secured from a friend, which the group members had to pay with interest. During the group's preparatory climb in New Zealand, Globe Telecom, one of the Philippines' top telecommunications companies and where Pablo was an executive, sponsored them. During the Mustagh Ata expedition, the team slept at the airport and ate food samples from vendors to save the $100 per diem given to each member.

The group also approached GMA Network, one of the Philippines' top television networks, to secure funding in exchange for coverage rights, but the network declined because it could not meet the team's request for airtime. The group then approached rival TV network ABS-CBN who provided funding and sponsorship in return for exclusive coverage rights of the ascent.

With ABS-CBN securing the coverage rights, it secured advertising and sponsorship deals from brands such as Philippine Airlines, Fitness First, Coleman Company, FedEx, Kodak, Globe Telecom, Rudy Project, National Sports Grill, PowerUp and Philippine Accident Manager's Insurance. Stratworks Inc. served as the expedition's official public relations agency, while MedCentral became its official medical services provider.

Before the expedition, ABS-CBN sent journalist Abner Mercado to follow the team during their training in New Zealand and report on their preparations in the network's primetime newscasts. During the expedition, the network also sent Mercado and fellow ABS-CBN journalist Vince Rodriguez at the Everest Base Camp with a broadcast team to report live via satellite on the climbers' preparations and ascent progress.

== Expedition ==
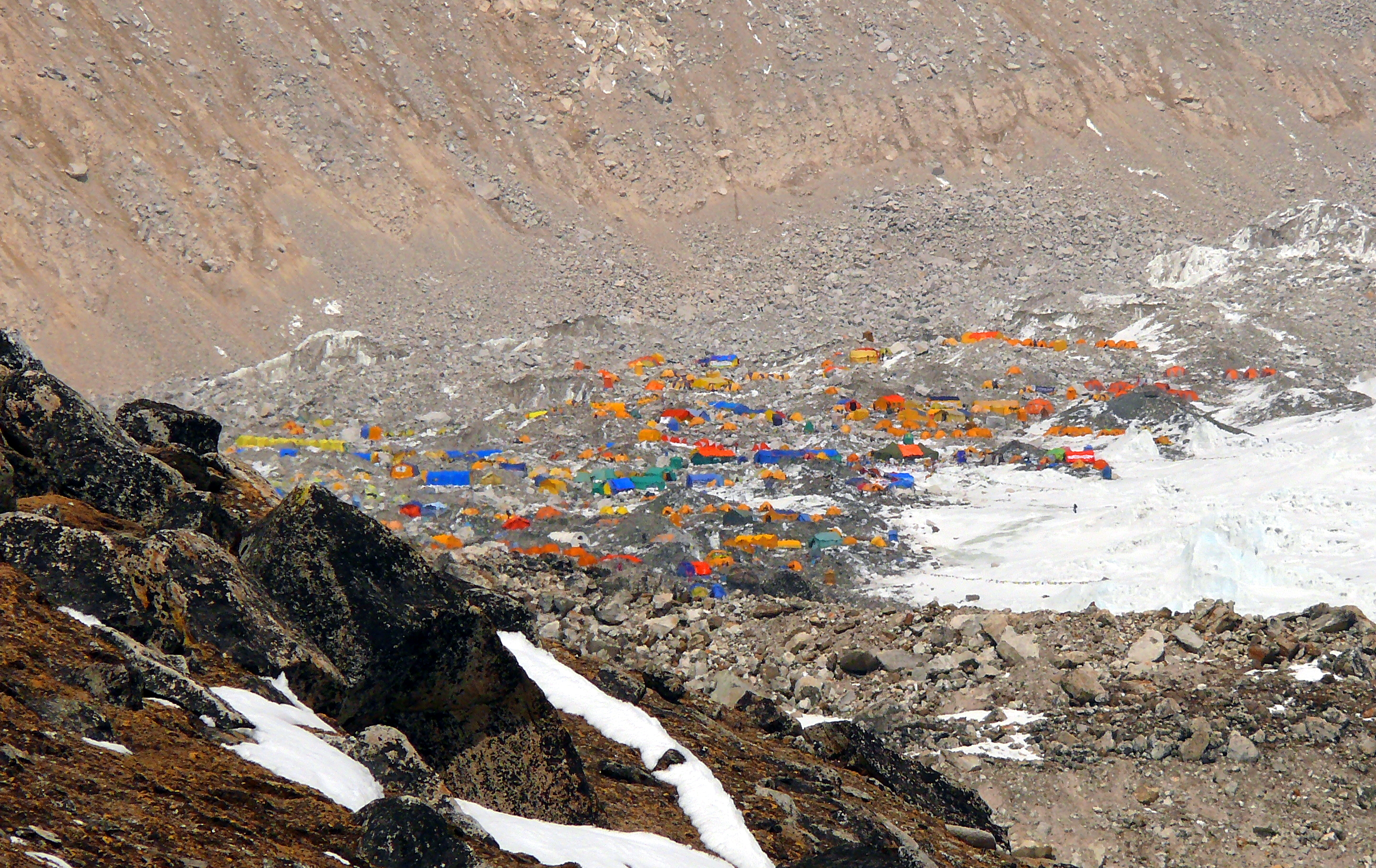
The Everest Base Camp on the Nepali side as viewed from Kala Patthar in January 2006.

=== Arrival in Nepal ===
After Garduce announced his solo bid to ascend Mount Everest, the national team decided to accelerate their preparations and move their ascent of Everest to spring of 2006 in a bid to be ahead of Garduce. Instead of the original plan of ascending Mount Everest from both the north and south cols, the team prioritized the ascent of its strongest and most experienced members, Oracion and Emata, via the traditional south col route that pioneer Everest summiteers Edmund Hillary and Tenzing Norgay originally took in 1953.

In February 2006, Oracion and Emata went to Nepal to begin acclimatization with the rest of the team arriving in Kathmandu on the first week of April. The team contracted Thamserku Trekking as their official trekking agency during the expedition, which provided them with two Sherpa guides Pemba Chhoti and Lakpa Gyalzen as well as several porters. The team flew from Kathmandu to Lukla on April 11 and trekked to Everest Base Camp (EBC) via Namche Bazaar and Lobuche, arriving on April 17.

With Oracion and Emata's ascent as the priority, the rest of the team's climbers, particularly female climbers Belarmino, Dayondon and Wenceslao, along with Pablo and Nayangahan were told to focus on preparing for an all-female Everest climb the following year. Taking advantage of their stay in the Khumbu Region, they scaled Dingboche Peak (5,200 m), Kala Patthar (5,644.5 m) and Island Peak (6,189 m).

On April 26, Oracion and Emata began their acclimatization hikes, crossing the Khumbu Icefall to reach Camp I (6,000 m). The following day, they reached Camp II (6,300 m) below the Lhotse Face and on April 28, they reached Camp III (7,115 m) on the Lhotse Face. They set up their tents and equipment in each camp before returning to EBC from Camp III on April 29.

=== Oracion's ascent ===
Oracion together with Sherpa guide Pemba Chhoti left the EBC on May 13 and arrived at Camp IV (7,900 meters) on the morning of May 16 where the pair rested. With the aid of supplemental oxygen, the pair left the camp at 10:00 p.m. amid windy, snowfall conditions but as they got higher the snowfall stopped and the weather became quieter. The pair was bogged down by the traffic ahead of them consisting of the British, Swiss and other expedition teams. Chhoti led the final stretch to summit and assisted Oracion. The pair arrived at the summit on May 17 at 3:30 p.m. — 18 hours and 30 minutes after leaving Camp IV.

Upon reaching the top, Oración radioed to Valdez and said: "The Philippine Eagle has landed." His statement is based on Neil Armstrong's message "The Eagle has landed" when the Apollo 11 Lunar Module, nicknamed the "Eagle", landed on the moon. Chhoti also took photos of Oracion waving the Philippine flag that he brought with him to the summit as well as showing a crayon drawing of the Philippine flag made by Oracion's five-year-old daughter. The pair stayed at the summit for 30 minutes before descending to Camp IV at 10:00 p.m. of May 17.

=== Emata's ascent ===
After Oracion and Chhoti arrived from their descent of the summit, Emata and his Sherpa guide Lakpa Gyalzen left Camp IV at 10:20 p.m. of May 17 under windy conditions. Aided by supplement oxygen since leaving Camp III, the pair reached the summit at 5:20 a.m. of May 18 under good weather, making Emata the second Filipino to reach the summit of Mount Everest. They completed the ascent in just seven hours, which was faster than Oracion and Chhoti's ascent.

Upon arrival at the summit, Emata radioed Valdez at base camp, saying: "Summit to Base Camp. Summit to Base Camp. Ang ginaw-ginaw dito! (It's so cold here!)" After staying at the summit for 30 minutes, the pair descended and arrived at Camp IV at 9:45 a.m., rested for three hours, and then went down to Camp II along with Oracion and Chhoti. Oracion and Emata along with their Sherpas arrived at base camp on the afternoon of Friday, May 19.

The expedition returned to Kathmandu on May 25 and left Nepal on the evening of May 29, arriving in the Philippines the following day, May 30.

== Reception ==
Leo Oracion, the first Filipino to reach the summit of Mount Everest, answers questions from media partner ABS-CBN via satellite communication, after his successful summit attempt on May 17, 2006.

The ascent was celebrated in the Philippines, appearing in major prime time newscasts and on the front pages of several Filipino newspapers. The expedition members were treated to a hero's welcome upon arrival in Manila. Then Philippine President Gloria Macapagal Arroyo called it "a mark of Filipino excellence, perseverance and courage in braving the hard trek of nation-building." The team's spokesperson Reggie Pablo compared it to "putting a Filipino on the Moon."

I extend my heartfelt congratulations on behalf of the Filipino people to Leo Oracion on his spectacular achievement. He is the very picture of hard work, tenacity and courage. He has shown the world the stuff Filipinos are made of.

— Philippine President Gloria Macapagal Arroyo

On February 7, 2007, Arroyo conferred to Oracion and Emata the highest civilian honor called the Order of Lakandula with the special rank of "Champions for Life." Oracion's hometown of Mandaue City, Cebu gave him a hero's welcome upon his return, with the city government drafting a resolution commending him for his feat and awarding him a P25,000 incentive. Likewise, Emata was met with a grand welcome upon his arrival in Davao City and his hometown of Tagum City, Davao del Norte

With the success of the First Philippine Mount Everest Expedition, the organizers were able to organize a successful all-female Mount Everest expedition composed primarily of Wenceslao, Dayondon and Belarmino during the spring climbing season in 2007.

== Controversy ==
As the First Philippine Mount Everest Expedition celebrated their success, a fourth Filipino climber, Dale Abenojar dampened the celebratory mood by claiming to have reached the summit of Mount Everest via the northern route from Tibet. According to a press statement by Abenojar's wife Liza, her husband actually reached the summit at 8 a.m. of May 15 — two days before Oración and Chhoti, but his attempt was undocumented.

After nearly a month, Everest chronicler Elizabeth Hawley listed Abenojar's claim on The Himalayan Database, which records every ascent in the Himalayas region since 1903. However, in her entry, she indicated that Abenojar's claim is disputed or unverified as he only presented his Sherpa and two summit photos as proof. She showed the photos to Canadian-Australian mountaineer Vince Walters, who had just climbed from the northern side but did not summit. Walters said the pattern and colors of the person's down clothes in the photo were the same as those on Abenojar's clothes.

I met him myself. I interviewed him at his request. I believe he reached the summit. It has been disputed, but he has photos and I have copies of those photos. He gave me two photos of a person on the top, and one of these clearly shows Makalu (but not Lhotse) in the background, which means that it was shot by someone at the summit of Everest from the north side.

— Elizabeth Hawley, in a phone interview with the Philippine Daily Inquirer

However, in her route notes for Abenojar in The Himalayan Database, Hawley also included this statement which she made in response to a correspondence with mountaineer James Ben Mallen:

I have not specifically stated that Mr. Abenojar was on the summit. To the question whether I confirm that he was the first Filipino to reach the top, I have said that I have no idea who amongst them got there first.

— Elizabeth Hawley, in response to Mallen's email

Hawley also noted that Abenojar presented a certificate from the China Tibet Mountaineering Association as proof that he reached the summit of Mount Everest. The certificate was awarded based interviews conducted by the liaison officer with Abenojar, his Sherpa and other climbers that summited through Tibet. The First Philippine Mount Everest Expedition has dismissed Abenojar's CTMA summit certificate as a "forgery" and his claim a "hoax", and maintained that Oracion and Emata were the first and second Filipinos to conquer Mount Everest. The FPMEE does not have any authority nor jurisdiction over declaring Abenojar's CTMA summit certificate as a forgery unless it is declared as such by the CTMA and the FPMEE also could not state that Abenojar's claim is a "hoax" unless FPMEE can prove it against the photos, the CTMA and the other interviewees who certified to have seen Abenojar. As to who was the first among the four Filipinos to reach the summit of Mt. Everest, surely they were the first four although Abenojar has the earliest dated certification.

== See also ==
- Leo Oracion
- Erwin Emata
- Romi Garduce
- Dale Abenojar
- List of Mount Everest expeditions
