= Carina Dayondon =

Filipina mountaineer

- Born: Carina Dayondon; 15 July 1978 (age 48); Don Carlos, Bukidnon, Philippines
- Education: Xavier University – Ateneo de Cagayan
- Occupations: Mountaineer and adventurer
- Employer: Philippine Coast Guard
- Known for: The first Filipina to reach the Seven Summits; second Filipina to reach summit of Mount Everest

Carina Dayondon (born 15 July 1978) is a Filipina mountaineer and Philippine Coast Guard officer who was the first Filipina to reach the Seven Summits, the highest mountain on every continent in the world, and the second Filipina to reach the summit of Mount Everest.

Dayondon, along with fellow female mountaineers Noelle Wenceslao and Janet Belarmino, reached the summit of Mount Everest on 16 May 2007 as part of an all-women Philippine expedition that climbed from the northern route and descended via the southern route. She has also reached the summits of Denali (2006), Mount Elbrus (2013), Mount Kosciuszko (2014), Kilimanjaro (2015), and Aconcagua (2017). In 2018, she reached the summit of Vinson Massif in Antarctica, thus completing the Seven Summits.

== Early life ==
Dayondon was born and raised in Don Carlos, Bukidnon, the fourth out of 15 children of retired bankers. Her mother worked operated a lodging service from their home while her father worked at the local agriculture office.

She studied at the Don Carlos Central Elementary School and at the San Isidro College High School in Malaybalay for her basic education. She was a member of the Girl Scouts of the Philippines in elementary school. In high school, she was a class auditor, a member of the Booklovers' Club, a platoon leader in the Citizens' Army Training, and the Filipino editor of their school publication. She went to college at Xavier University – Ateneo de Cagayan in Cagayan de Oro, taking up Bachelor of Science in Business Management and joining the Xavier University-Ateneo Mountaineering Society (XU-AMS).

Due to financial difficulties, Dayondon supported herself to school by working part-time as a climbing instructor, as a salesclerk for an outdoor shop, as a babysitter, and sometimes, selling lottery tickets. It took her nine years to finish college as she participated in numerous adventure racing sports in between studies to earn extra income to support her siblings.

At 17, Dayondon successfully completed her first climb to Mount Kitanglad in Bukidnon, the fourth tallest mountain in the Philippines, as part of an XU-AMS expedition. She later reached the summits of Mount Kalatungan and Musuan Peak, both in Bukidnon.

== Climbing Mount Everest ==
=== 2006 Philippine Mount Everest Expedition ===
In 2004, while still completing her studies, Dayondon was invited to join the first Philippine Mount Everest Expedition organized by then Transportation and Communications undersecretary Art Valdez. As one of the top female adventure racers in the country, she was a natural choice for the organizers. She joined fellow female mountaineers Janet Belarmino and Noelle Wenceslao in advanced mountaineering training along with the male expedition members at the Western Himalayan Mountaineering Institute in Manali, India. During the training, she scaled the Baralacha Pass (4,890 m) near Manali and Kyorang Peak (6,300 m) in Ladakh.

In April 2005, Dayondon went with the expedition to New Zealand for a 10-day preparatory climb, in which she summited Mount Aylmer (2,699 m) and Aoraki / Mount Cook (3,724 m) in the Southern Alps. After New Zealand, she joined the expedition in China's Xinjiang Region in August 2005 to climb Mustagh Ata (7,509 m).

After Filipino mountaineer Romi Garduce announced his solo attempt to climb Mount Everest in the spring of 2006, the expedition decided to fast track their preparations to get ahead of Garduce. The expedition organizers decided to prioritize the ascent of two of their most experienced climbers, Leo Oracion and Erwin Emata, who would later become the first and second Filipinos to reach the summit of Mount Everest on 17 and 18 May 2006, respectively. The organizers decided that Dayondon, Wenceslao and Belarmino, would make another attempt to summit Mount Everest in an all-female expedition the following year.

=== Successful 2007 Mount Everest attempt ===
To prepare for their Mount Everest attempt during the 2007 spring climbing season, Dayondon, Wenceslao, and 2006 Philippine Mount Everest Expedition spokesperson Reggie Pablo, decided to fly to Alaska on 19 May 2006 and climb Denali, the tallest mountain in North America at 20,310 feet (6,190 m), which they summited on 23 June. Following this successful expedition, Dayondon, Wenceslao, and Pablo flew to Tibet in September 2006 to climb Cho Oyu, the sixth tallest mountain in the world. The group backed out on 7 October 2006 at 8,100 metres (26,575 ft) due to bad weather.

During the spring climbing season the following year, the all-female Philippine expedition led by Valdez and composed of Wenceslao, Dayondon, and Belarmino, began their attempt to ascent Mount Everest. Their plan was to ascend the mountain via the northern route in Tibet and then descend through the southern route in Nepal. On 16 May 2007, at 6:10 a.m. Nepal Time, Wenceslao, along with Pemba Chhoti Sherpa, reached the summit of Mount Everest, thus, becoming the first Filipina to reach the summit. Dayondon, along with Lhakpa Gyalzen Sherpa, reached the summit 10 minutes later at 6:20 a.m., thus becoming the second Filipina to reach the summit of Mount Everest. She was 28 years old at the time of her ascent. Belarmino, along with Pasang Nuru and Ang Phurba Sherpa, reached the summit at 9 a.m., two hours and 40 minutes later, thus becoming the third Filipina on top of Mount Everest.

== Climbing the Seven Summits ==
Having summited Mount Everest and Denali, Dayondon set her sights on completing the Seven Summits. In 2013, she summited Mount Elbrus in southern Russia's Caucasus Mountain Range, which is tallest mountain in Europe at 5,642 metres (18,510 ft) in elevation. The following year, she summited Mount Kosciuszko in New South Wales, Australia, which is Oceania's tallest mountain at 2,228 metres (7,310 ft). She summited Africa's tallest mountain, Kilimanjaro, which is 5,895 metres (19,341 ft) in height, in 2015. She completed the Seven Summits in 2018 with back-to-back climbs to the summit of Aconcagua, which is South America's tallest mountain at 6,961 metres (22,838 ft), and Vinson Massif, which is the tallest mountain in Antarctica at 4,892 metres (16,050 ft). By completing the ascent of the Seven Summits, Dayondon became the first Filipino woman to ascend the Bass version of the Seven Summits.

Upon completing her ascent of the Seven Summits, Dayondon was honored by the Senate of the Philippines through Senate Resolution 985, which was filed by Senator Nancy Binay and recognizes Dayondon for having "displayed the brilliance and excellence of Filipinos despite insurmountable odds that brings immense pride and honor to the country."

== Personal life ==
Outside of mountaineering, Dayondon is an officer of the Philippine Coast Guard with the rank of Lieutenant Junior Grade. She works in the agency as a training officer and uses her story to inspire the next generations of Coast Guard cadets into serving the agency and the Philippines. In 2019, she was honored with the Conservation Hero Award by the World Wide Fund for Nature (WWF) for her role in spreading awareness on environmental conservation through her speaking engagements with the WWF about her Seven Summits ascent. In the same year, she was also named among the Most Inspiring Filipinas, a recognition given by American toy manufacturer Mattel, the makers of Barbie dolls, and its Philippine distributor, Richprime Global, as part of the Dream Gap Project for International Women's Day to inspire young girls with women role models.

In May 2018, during a break between her ascent of Mount Aconcagua and Vinson Massif, Dayondon participated in the journey of the Philippine Balangay Expedition, also organized by Valdez and participated in by members of the 2006 and 2007 Philippine Mount Everest Expeditions. She made the journey from Manila to Quanzhou, China in a traditional balangay, a wooden seafaring boat used by precolonial Filipinos in trading with neighboring civilizations. The journey was conducted to celebrate the precolonial ties between the Philippines and China.
