= Noelle Wenceslao =

Filipina mountaineer

- Born: Noelle Christina Wenceslao (born 1979); San Juan, Metro Manila, Philippines
- Education: University of the Philippines Diliman
- Occupations: Mountaineer, athlete, and adventurer
- Employer: Philippine Coast Guard
- Known for: The first Filipina to reach the summit of Mount Everest

Noelle Christina Wenceslao (born 1979) is a Filipina mountaineer, adventurer, and Philippine Coast Guard officer who, on 16 May 2007, became the first Filipina to reach the summit of Mount Everest. She, along with fellow female mountaineers Carina Dayondon and Janet Belarmino, reached the summit of Mount Everest as part of an all-women Philippine expedition that climbed the tallest mountain in the world from the northern route and descended via the southern route.

== Early life ==
Little is known about Wenceslao's life. Based on Elizabeth Hawley's The Himalayan Database, she was born in 1979 in San Juan, Metro Manila, Philippines and was 27 years old at the time of her successful ascent of Mount Everest in 2007. For her basic education, she studied at the Saint Pedro Poveda College (then known as the Poveda Learning Center), a private, Roman Catholic school exclusively for girls in Metro Manila's Ortigas business district. She graduated high school in 1998 at the top of her class and enrolled at the University of the Philippines Diliman in a computer engineering degree.

At the university, Wenceslao, who wasn't athletic and hated sports during her childhood, became active in the UP Dragon Boat Team and the UP Mountaineers. She later joined the Philippine Canoe and Kayak Federation (PCKF) Women's National Team, which competed in dragon boat competitions abroad. Due to dragon boat training and competitions taking up much of her time in college, she dropped out of her computer engineering course. She spent two years as a non-major at the university, until she was admitted in the College of Human Kinetics. Aside from mountaineering and dragon boat paddling, she also participated in local adventure races and triathlons.

== Climbing Mount Everest ==
=== 2006 Philippine Mount Everest expedition ===
In 2004, while still completing her studies, Wenceslao was invited to join the first Philippine Mount Everest expedition organized by then Transportation and Communications undersecretary Art Valdez. As one of the top female adventure racers in the country, she was a natural choice for the organizers. Wenceslao gave up her place in the National Dragon Boat Team to train for the expedition. She joined fellow female mountaineers Janet Belarmino and Carina Dayondon in advanced mountaineering training along with the male expedition members at the Western Himalayan Mountaineering Institute in Manali, India. During the training, she scaled the Baralacha Pass (4,890 m) near Manali and Kyorang Peak (6,300 m) in Ladakh.

In April 2005 Wenceslao went with the expedition to New Zealand for a 10-day preparatory climb, in which she summitted Mount Aylmer (2699 m) and Aoraki / Mount Cook (3,724 m) in the Southern Alps. After New Zealand, she joined the expedition in China's Xinjiang Region in August 2005 to climb Mustagh Ata (7,509 m).

After Filipino mountaineer Romi Garduce announced his solo attempt to climb Mount Everest in the spring of 2006, the expedition decided to fast track their preparations to get ahead of Garduce. The expedition organizers decided to prioritize the ascent of two of their most experienced climbers, Leo Oracion and Erwin Emata, who would later become the first and second Filipinos to reach the summit of Mount Everest on 17 and 18 May 2006, respectively. The organizers decided that Wenceslao, Dayondon, and Belarmino, would make another attempt to summit Mount Everest in an all-female expedition the following year.

=== Successful 2007 Mount Everest attempt ===
To prepare for their Mount Everest attempt during the 2007 spring climbing season, Wenceslao, along with Dayondon, and 2006 Philippine Mount Everest Expedition spokesperson Reggie Pablo, decided to fly to Alaska on 19 May 2006 and climb Denali, the tallest mountain in North America at 20,310 feet (6,190 m), which they summitted on 23 June. Following this successful expedition, they flew to Tibet in September 2006 to climb Mount Cho Oyu, the sixth tallest mountain in the world. The group backed out on 7 October 2006 at 8,100 metres (26,575 ft) due to bad weather.

During the spring climbing season the following year, the all-female Philippine expedition led by Valdez and composed of Wenceslao, Dayondon, and Belarmino, began their attempt to ascent Mount Everest. Their plan was to ascend the mountain via the northern route in Tibet and then descend the mountain through the southern route in Nepal. On 16 May 2007, at 6:10 am. Nepal Time, Wenceslao, along with Pemba Chhoti Sherpa, reached the summit of Mount Everest, thus, becoming the first Filipina to reach the summit. Dayondon, along with Lhakpa Gyalzen Shrepa, reached the summit 10 minutes later at 6:20 am, while Belarmino, along with Pasang Nuru and Ang Phurba Sherpa, reached the summit at 9 am, two hours and 40 minutes later, thus becoming the third Filipina on top of Mount Everest. Wenceslao suffered from acute mountain sickness and pulmonary edema during the ascent but survived and made it back to the Nepalese base camp via the southern route.

Following her successful ascent as the first Filipina to reach the summit of Mount Everest, Wenceslao was often erroneously referred in the Philippine media as the first Southeast Asian woman to reach the summit of Mount Everest, when in fact, this feat was first accomplished in September 1996 by Indonesian mountaineer Clara Sumarwati.

== Dragon boat paddling ==
After returning to the Philippines at the end of her Mount Everest expedition, Wenceslao returned to the National Dragon Boat Team, where she continued to train and participated in major international dragon boat tournaments. She joined the team in 2007 World Dragon Boat Championships in Sydney; the 2008 Asian Dragon Boat Championships in Penang, Malaysia; the 2009 World Dragon Boat Championships in Prague, Czech Republic where they won two gold medals; and the 2012 World Dragon Boat Championships in Milan, Italy, where they won six gold medals and received a total of ₱2.6 million in incentives from the Philippine government.

== Personal life ==
Outside of mountaineering, Wenceslao is an officer of the Philippine Coast Guard, which she joined prior to her Mount Everest ascent. She holds the rank of sergeant and uses her story to inspire the next generations of Coast Guard cadets into serving the agency and the Philippines.

In May 2018, Wenceslao and fellow Everest summiteer Dayondon participated in the journey of the Philippine Balangay Expedition, also organized by Valdez and participated in by members of the 2006 and 2007 Philippine Mount Everest Expeditions. they made the journey from Manila to Quanzhou, China in a traditional balangay, a wooden seafaring boat used by precolonial Filipinos in trading with neighboring civilizations. The journey was conducted to celebrate the precolonial ties between the Philippines and China.
