= List of outdoor exponents in the Philippines =

This is a list of names connected with primal living, wilderness adventure, and challenge-based education.

Name	Notability	References
Dale Sto. Tomás Abenojár	Mountain climber. First Filipino to summit Mt. Everest from the north.	
Alejandro Ilagan Atienza / Kim Atienza	Television host and weathercaster who popularizes health, fitness, and outdoor activities.	
John Bennett	British technical diver. Founded Atlantis Tech at Atlantis Dive Resort, Puerto Galera, Oriental Mindoro. First human to scuba dive deeper than 1,000 feet (300 meters), which he accomplished at 308 meters, 6 November 2001, off Puerto Galera.	
Tomás Cloma	Lawyer, fishing magnate, adventurer, and maritime educator who founded PMI Colleges, and discovered and claimed the uninhabited Kalayaan Islands.	
Brian Cone	Technical climber. Staff member, Pro-Action Associates, California. Conducted pioneering high-element ropes course training in Bataan in 1992.	
Jose Eduardo Delgado	Supply chain magnate; head of Delgado Brothers Inc. Hard Enduro rider, pilot, IANTD technical scuba diver, caver, mountaineer. Past Member, National Executive Board, Boy Scouts of the Philippines. Recipient, Silver Tamaraw, Boy Scouts of the Philippines. Developed very light street-legal Hard Enduro 125cc 4-stroke motorcycle, weighing less than 63 kg empty. Developed tropical hiking boot for Tech-X.	
Erwin Emata	Mountain climber. Third Filipino to summit Mt. Everest.	
Alfredo E. Evangelista	Anthropologist, archeological explorer.	
Romeo Garduce	Mountain climber. First Filipino to summit Mt. Everest from the south.	
Bob Garon	Counselor. As a Catholic religious priest, he was heavily involved in rehabilitation for drug addicts. Ran "Upward Bound" motivational challenge courses. He later obtained dispensation to leave priesthood, married, and continued offering counseling / therapy services.	
Domingo "Hector" Igarta	Scoutmaster. Wood Badge holder. Commissioner, Manila Council, Boy Scouts of the Philippines. Graduate, Mountain Search and Rescue Team. Chairman, Zion Mountaineering Society. Co-founder, Adventure-Based Counseling Inc.	
Lapulapu	Malay tribal chieftain on what is today Mactan Island, Philippines. Attacked by Spanish and Portuguese under Fernão de Magalhães, he fought a defensive battle which resulted in Magalhães's death. Today regarded as the first "Filipino" hero.	
Dominador de la Junta Liwanag	Born circa 1950, Dominadór Liwanag, a.k.a. "Tata Casóy," is now a tribal elder of the Ambala tribe of the Aeta nation in Zambales province. He was instructor to the U.S. Marines at the Jungle Environment Survival Training in the rain forest inside the Subic Bay Naval Base. He is now the most senior among Aetas who conduct forest living demonstrations for visitors at Pamulaklakin Forest Trail, Subic Freeport, and still wears the traditional Aeta bahág or loin cloth. He was filmed for the 25th season of the U.S. television series Survivor, shot in Caramoan, Camarines Sur.	
Lawrence Dy Ong	Chinese Filipino humanitarian. Pupil of Rino Taini, EdD. As the Activity-Based Counselor of the International Catholic Migration Commission ESL/CO, he ran the first full-range fully operational ropes course / adventure-based counseling / team-building course in the Philippines, 1990-1993. Conducted the first formal ropes course / ABC facilitator’s training by a Filipino, 1992. Founded a Boy Scouts of America troop. Founded Kanawan Elementary School for Aeta children at sitio Kanawan, Sabang, Morong, Bataan. Conducted adventure-based counseling with impoverished Filipino Amerasian youth at Subic Bay Freeport Zone. Trained the founders of Adventure-Based Counseling Inc.	
Hiroo Onoda	Imperial Japanese Army intelligence officer who waged a guerrilla war against the Philippines on Lubang Island 1944-1974. One of the last known WW2 Japanese stragglers.	
Heracleo Salumbides Oración / Leo Oración	Mountain climber. Second Filipino to summit Mt. Everest from the south.	
Joy Roa	Airplane pilot. Proponent of air safaris to remote locations.	
Alex A. Santos	Scuba diving instructor. Founded Philippine Technical Divers (PHILTECH), the first licensee in Asia of the International Association of Nitrox and Technical Divers (IANTD). Pioneered advanced technical diving for marine wrecks and caves.	
Joseph Emile Hamilton Stevenot	Colonel, US Army. Executive, Philippine Council, Boy Scouts of America. Almost singlehandedly founded the Boy Scouts of the Philippines organization.	
George Tappan	Outdoor photographer.	
Gutsy Tuason	Marine photographer.	
Rogelio S. Villa	Civil engineer. Outdoor enthusiast. Wood Badge holder. Served in various local, regional, and national positions in the Boy Scouts of the Philippines, including National Training Director. Organised many National Jamborees of the Boy Scouts of the Philippines (BSP). Assigned as a manager of construction at the 20th World Scout Jamboree, Thailand, 2003. Founder, Scout Mountaineers. Constructed the first climbing walls at the BSP National Office (Manila) and the BSP Center (Makiling, Laguna). Instructor, BSP National Training School. Co-founder and President, Adventure-Based Counseling Inc.	
