= 2011 Kerala Sahitya Akademi Awards =

Indian literary awards

Kerala Sahitya Akademi Award
- Awarded for: Outstanding books of literary merit
- Date: 2 August 2012
- Location: Thrissur
- Country: India
- Presented by: Kerala Sahitya Akademi
- First award: 1958

The 2011 Kerala Sahitya Akademi Award was announced on 2 August 2012. The award has been given each year since 1958 by the Kerala Sahitya Akademi (Kerala Literary Academy), to a Malayalam writer for a book of outstanding literary merit.

Writers T. Padmanabhan and Anand received the fellowships in 2011.

== Winners ==
Category	Recipient	Work
Poetry	Kureepuzha Sreekumar	Keezhalan
Novel	Subhash Chandran	Manushyanu Oru Amukham
Story	U. K. Kumaran	Policukarante Penmakkal
Drama	Balasubrahmanian	Cholliyattam
Literary criticism	B. Rajeevan	Vakkukalum Vasthuthakalum
Autobiography/Biography	K. R. Gowri Amma	Athmakatha
Travelogue	T. N. Gopakumar	Volga Tharangangal
Humour	Lalithambika	Kaliyum Karyavum
Scholarly literature	L. S. Rajagopalan	Eenavum Thalavum
Sree Padmanabhaswamy Award for Children's literature	K. Radhakrishnan	Gandhijiyude Atmakatha Kuttikalkku
Translation	K. B. Prasanna Kumar	Ka:
Overall Contributions	Chathanathu Achuthanunni	—
Overall Contributions	P. T. Chacko	—
Overall Contributions	K. B. Sreedevi	—
Overall Contributions	Joseph Vyttila	—

== Fellowships ==
- T. Padmanabhan
- Anand

== Endowments ==
- I. C. Chacko Award: N. K. Mary (Malayala Vyakarana Sidhanthangal)
- C. B. Kumar Award: S. Gopalakrishnan (Kathapole Chilathu Sambhavikkumbol)
- K.R. Namboodiri Award: Thuravur Viswambharan (Mahabharatha Paryadanam Bharathadarsanam: Punarvayana)
- Kanakasree Award: Aryambika S. V. (Thonniya Poloru Puzha)
- Geetha Hiranyan Award: Dhanya Raj (Pachayude Album)
- G. N. Pillai Award: Anniyil Tharakan (Bharatheeya Darsanam English Kavithayil)
