= CTMA =

CTMA can refer to several different things:

- China Tibet Mountaineering Association
- Confederation of Tamil Nadu Malayalee Associations
- Coopérative de transport maritime et aérien, a company operating ferry services in Canada
