= Tibet Himalaya Mountaineering Guide School =

Mounatineering school in Lhasa, Tibet

Location
- Lhasa, Tibet Autonomous Region; China

Information
- Founded: 12 July 1999
- Founder: Nyima Tsering

The Tibet Himalaya Mountaineering Guide School (also known as Lhasa Himalaya Mountaineering Guide School and Tibet Mountaineering School, Chinese: 西藏登山学校) is a mountaineering school, located in Lhasa, Tibet Autonomous Region, China.

== History ==
The school was founded in 1999 by Nyima Tsering, a three-time Mount Everest climber. Graduates of this school have led more than 180 mountain climbers from around the world to the top of Everest.

== See also ==
- China Tibet Mountaineering Association
