= Born to Be Wild (TV program) =

Philippine television documentary show

- Title card since 2023
- Genre: Travel documentary
- Presented by: Romi Garduce; Ferdinand Recio; Kiko Rustia; Nielsen Donato; Mariz Umali
- Country of origin: Philippines
- Original language: Tagalog

Production
- Camera setup: Multiple-camera setup
- Running time: 35 minutes
- Production company: GMA Public Affairs

Original release
- Network: GMA Network
- Release: November 28, 2007 – present

Born to Be Wild is a Philippine television travel documentary show broadcast by GMA Network. Originally hosted by Romi Garduce and Ferdinand Recio, it premiered on November 28, 2007, on the network's evening line up. Recio and Nielsen Donato currently serve as the hosts.

== Hosts ==
- Ferdinand Recio
- Nielsen Donato (since 2012)

Former hosts

- Romi Garduce (2007–09)
- Kiko Rustia (2009–12)
- Mariz Umali (2012–15)

== Production ==
In March 2020, production was halted due to the enhanced community quarantine in Luzon caused by the COVID-19 pandemic. The show resumed its programming on August 2, 2020.

== Accolades ==
Accolades received by Born to Be Wild
Year	Award	Category	Recipient	Result	Ref.
	1st ASEAN Champions of Biodiversity	Media Category	Born to Be Wild	Won	
	Climate Change Commission	Fr. Neri Satur Award for Environmental Heroism Awardee	Born to Be Wild	Won	
	New York Festivals	Certificate (Nature & Wildlife Category)	"The Born Expeditions Finale"	Finalist	
2008	22nd PMPC Star Awards for Television	Best Educational Program	Born to Be Wild	Nominated	
2008	22nd PMPC Star Awards for Television	Best Educational Program Host	Romi Garduce	Nominated	
2008	22nd PMPC Star Awards for Television	Best Educational Program Host	Ferdz Recio	Nominated	
2008	22nd PMPC Star Awards for Television	Best New Male TV Personality	Ferdz Recio	Nominated	
2009	1st MTRCB TV Awards	Special Award for Promoting Environmental Protection	Born to Be Wild	Won	
2009	23rd PMPC Star Awards for Television	Best Educational Program	Born to Be Wild	Nominated	
2009	23rd PMPC Star Awards for Television	Best Educational Program Host	Kiko Rustia Ferdz Recio	Nominated	
2010	24th PMPC Star Awards for Television	Best Educational Program	Born to Be Wild	Nominated	
2010	24th PMPC Star Awards for Television	Best Educational Program Host	Kiko Rustia Ferdz Recio	Nominated	
2011	33rd Catholic Mass Media Awards	Special Citation for Best Adult Educational Program	Born to Be Wild	Won	
2011	25th PMPC Star Awards for Television	Best Educational Program	Born to Be Wild	Nominated	
2011	25th PMPC Star Awards for Television	Best Educational Program Host	Kiko Rustia Ferdz Recio	Nominated	
2012	26th PMPC Star Awards for Television	Best Educational/Children's Program	Born to Be Wild	Nominated	
2012	26th PMPC Star Awards for Television	Best Educational/Children's Program Host	Nielsen Donato Ferdz Recio	Nominated	
2013	Golden Screen TV Awards	Outstanding Natural History/Wildlife Program	“Water Snakes and Whale Sharks”	Nominated	
2013	Golden Screen TV Awards	Outstanding Natural History/Wildlife Program Host	Nielsen Donato	Nominated	
2013	27th PMPC Star Awards for Television	Best Educational Program	Born to Be Wild	Won	
2013	27th PMPC Star Awards for Television	Best Educational Program Host	Nielsen Donato Ferdz Recio	Nominated	
2013	7th UPLB Isko’t Iska's Broadcast Choice Awards	Best Environment-Oriented Program	Born to Be Wild	Won	
2014	Golden Screen TV Awards	Outstanding Natural History Wildlife Program	Born to Be Wild	Won	
2014	Golden Screen TV Awards	Outstanding Natural History Wildlife Program Host	Ferdz Recio	Won	
2014	28th PMPC Star Awards for Television	Best Educational Program	Born to Be Wild	Won	
2014	28th PMPC Star Awards for Television	Best Educational Program Host	Nielsen Donato Ferdz Recio	Nominated	
2015	29th PMPC Star Awards for Television	Best Educational Program	Born to Be Wild	Nominated	
2015	29th PMPC Star Awards for Television	Best Educational Program Host	Nielsen Donato Ferdz Recio	Nominated	
2016	30th PMPC Star Awards for Television	Best Educational Program	Born to Be Wild	Nominated	
2016	30th PMPC Star Awards for Television	Best Educational Program Host	Nielsen Donato Ferdz Recio	Nominated	
2017	31st PMPC Star Awards for Television	Best Educational Program	Born to Be Wild	Nominated	
2017	31st PMPC Star Awards for Television	Best Educational Program Host	Nielsen Donato Ferdz Recio	Nominated	
2018	32nd PMPC Star Awards for Television	Best Educational Program	Born to Be Wild	Nominated	
2018	32nd PMPC Star Awards for Television	Best Educational Program Host	Ferdie Recio	Nominated	
2019	Anak TV Seal Awards		Born to Be Wild	Won	
2019	33rd PMPC Star Awards for Television	Best Educational Program	Born to Be Wild	Nominated	
2019	33rd PMPC Star Awards for Television	Best Educational Program Host	Ferdie Recio Nielsen Donato	Nominated	
2021	34th PMPC Star Awards for Television	Best Educational Program	Born to Be Wild	Won	
2021	34th PMPC Star Awards for Television	Best Educational Program Host	Ferdie Recio Nielsen Donato	Nominated	
2023	35th PMPC Star Awards for Television	Best Educational Program	Born to Be Wild	Won	
2023	35th PMPC Star Awards for Television	Best Educational Program Host	Ferdie Recio Nielsen Donato	Nominated	
2024	6th Gawad Lasallianeta	Most Outstanding Travel/Lifestyle Show	Born to Be Wild	Won	
2025	36th PMPC Star Awards for Television	Best Educational Program	Born to Be Wild	Pending	
2025	36th PMPC Star Awards for Television	Best Educational Program Host	Nielsen Donato Ferds Rocio	Pending	
