= Manushyanu Oru Aamukham =

Book by Subhash Chandran

- Author: Subhash Chandran
- Language: Malayalam
- Genre: Novel
- Publisher: DC Books
- Publication date: 2010
- Publication place: India
- Pages: 372
- Awards: Sahitya Akademi Award; Kerala Sahitya Academy Award; Odakkuzhal Award; Vayalar Award
- ISBN: 9788126428397

Manushyanu Oru Aamukham is a Malayalam debut novel by Subhash Chandran. The novel is set in Thachanakkara, a fictitious village in central Kerala, India, and has the central character named Jithendran. It was originally serialised in Mathrubhumi Weekly in 2009 and was published as a book by DC Books in 2010. The novel won the Kendra Sahitya Akademi Award (2014), Kerala Sahitya Akademi Award (2011), Odakkuzhal Award (2011), FOKANA Award (2012), Bhasha Institute's Basheer Puraskaaram (2012), Kovilan Puraskaaram (2012) and Vayalar Award (2015).

The novel was a critical success, and remains one of the best-selling books in Malayalam, selling more than 100,000 copies. The work was released in English translated by Dr Fathima E.V, Published by HarperCollins titled A Preface to Man
