= Subhash Chandran =

Indian writer

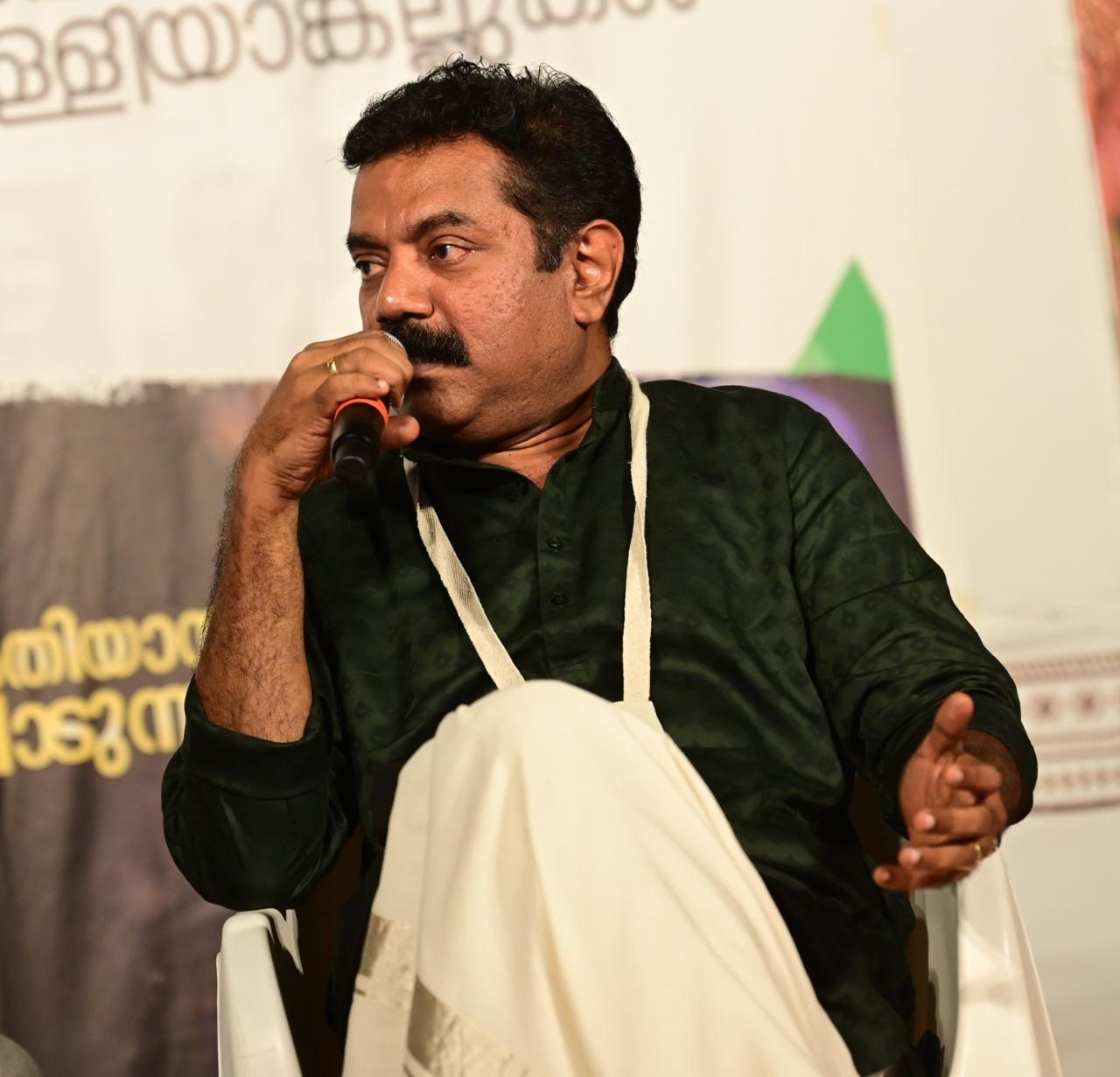
- Born: 1972 (age 53–54); Kadungalloor, Ernakulam District, Kerala State, India
- Occupation: Writer
- Spouse: Jayasree
- Children: 2
- Writing career
- Language: Malayalam
- Genre: Fiction
- Notable work: Manushyanu Oru Aamukham
- Notable awards: Kendra Sahitya Akademi Award, Kerala Sahitya Akademi Award

Subhash Chandran (born 1972) is a Malayalam novelist, short story writer and journalist from Kerala, India. His work includes the 2010 novel Manushyanu Oru Aamukham and the stories "Vadhakramam", "Sanmargam", "Parudeesa Nashtam" and "Guptham", which have been adapted into films. Chandran is the only writer to receive Kerala Sahitya Akademi Awards for both his debut story collection (Ghadikarangal Nilaykkunna Samayam- 2001) and debut novel (Manushyanu Oru Aamukham -2011).

== Early life and education ==
Subhash Chandran was born in 1972 in Kadungalloor, near Alwaye, Kerala, to Chandrasekharan Pillai and Ponnamma. He attended Maharaja's College, Ernakulam and completed his Master of Arts degree in Malayalam, securing the first rank from Mahatma Gandhi University. He then joined Mathrubhumi as a proofreader and moved to Kozhikode.

== Manushyanu Oru Amukham ==
Subhash Chandran's 2010 novel Manushyanu Oru Amukham is set in the fictional village of Thachanakkara, about a central character named Jithendran. The novel was originally serialised in Mathrubhumi Weekly in 2009, before being published by DC Books in 2010. The novel was a critical success, and remains one of the best-selling books in Malayalam, selling more than 100,000 copies. The novel won the Vayalar Award (2015), Kendra Sahithya Academy Award (2015) Kerala Sahitya Akademi Award (2011) Odakkuzhal Award (2011), FOKANA Award (2012), Bhasha Institute's Basheer Puraskaaram (2012) and Kovilan Puraskaaram (2012). In 2016, the novel was translated into English, with the title A Preface to Man, which went on to win the Crossword award for best Indian language fiction in translation.

== Film adaptations ==
Four of Chandran's stories have been adapted into films. Based on the story "Vadhakramam", Pune Film Institute produced a short film that won a special jury mention at the Rio de Janeiro Film Festival. The Malayalam feature film Laptop is an adaptation of the short story "Parudeesa Nashtam". His story "Sanmargam" was filmed as A Knife in the Bar in Malayalam while the story "Guptham" was filmed as Akasmikam by George Kithu.

== Personal life ==
Subhash Chandran is married to Jayasree and the couple have two daughters. He lives in Kozhikode. Currently, he is the editor-in-charge of leading Malayalam cultural magazine Mathrubhumi Illustrated weekly.

== Bibliography ==
- Manushyanu Oru Aamukham - Novel, DC Books
- Samudrashila - Novel, Mathrubhumi Books
- Jnanasnanam - Novella, Mathrubhumi Books
- Ghatikarangal Nilakkunna Samayam - Short stories, DC Books
- Parudeesa Nashtam - Short stories collection, DC Books
- Thalpam - Short stories, DC Books
- Bloody Mary - Short stories, DC Books
- Kathakal- Subhash Chandran - Short stories, DC Books
- Vihitham- Short stories, Mathrubhumi books
- Madhyeyingane- Vignettes, Mathrubhumi Books
- Kaanunnanerathu - Vignettes, Mathrubhumi Books
- Das Capital - Memoirs, Mathrubhumi Books
- Paadapusthakam - Memoirs, Mathrubhumi Books
- Kathayakkanavathe - Memoirs, Mathrubhumi Books
- 50 Atmakathakal - Memoirs, Mathrubhumi Books
- Janmam - screen play, Mathrubhumi Books
- Kaalaathivarthanam - articles on famous writers, Mathrubhumi Books
- Onnara Manikkoor - play, Saindhava Books
- Emtittham - Memoirs on M T Vasudevan nair, Mathrubhumi Books
- Bhoomiyammayum Makkalum - Children's literature, Mathrubhumi Books
- Bhoomiyile Malakha - Children's literature, Mathrubhumi Books
- Goliyum Valappottum - Children's literature, Mathrubhumi Books
- Kannadi Malika - Children's literature, Mathrubhumi Books
- Panavum Arppanavum - Children's literature, Mathrubhumi Books
- Swarnajalakamulla Veedu - Children's literature, Mathrubhumi Books
- Manthra Mothiram - Children's literature, Mathrubhumi Books
- Pandu pandoru Marthanda varma - Children's literature, Mathrubhumi Books
- Akkudu muyal Appam cuttu - Children's literature, DC Books
- Subhash Chandrante Avatharikakal - Introductions for various books by other writers, Macbeth Books
- Vaathil - Jottings, Mathrubhumi Books

== Awards and recognition ==
In 1994, his story "Ghatikarangal Nilaykkunna Samayam" won an award instituted by Mathrubhumi Vishuppathippu. He has won numerous other awards including the Kendra Sahitya Akademi Award, Kerala Sahitya Akademi Award, and Odakkuzhal Award. He was the only Malayalam writer included on a list of outstanding young Indian writers compiled by The Times of India. He is the first and only writer to receive the Kerala Sahitya Akademi Award for both his debut story collection and debut novel, in 2001 and 2011 respectively. The English translation of his novel Manushyanu Oru Aamukham, entitled A preface To Man, published by HarperCollins in 2016, won the Crossword Book Award.

- 2001: Kerala Sahitya Akademi Award for Story - Ghatikarangal Nilaykunna Samayam
- 2009: Abu Dhabi Sakthi Award (Story) - Parudeesa Nashtam
- 2011: Kerala Sahitya Akademi Award for Novel - Manushyanu Oru Amukham
- 2011: Odakkuzhal Award - Manushyanu Oru Amukham
- 2014: Kendra Sahitya Akademi Award - Manushyanu Oru Amukham
- 2015: Vayalar Award - Manushyanu Oru Amukham
- 2017: Abu Dhabi Sakthi Award (Drama) - Onnaramanikoor
- 2019: Padmarajan Award - Samudrashila
- 2023: Padmaprabha Literary Award
