= Joseph Vyttila =

Indian Malayalam language writer (1939–2024)

- Born: 23 May 1939; Vyttila, Cochin Kingdom, British Raj (present-day Eranakulam district)
- Died: 9 January 2024 (aged 84); Kochi, Eranakulam district, Kerala
- Occupation: Writer
- Spouse: Elizabeth
- Children: 3
- Writing career
- Notable awards: Kerala Sahitya Akademi Award for Overall Contributions (2011)

Joseph Vyttila was an Indian Malayalam language writer from Kerala. He had published 15 novels, 5 collections of stories, and 2 plays. In 2012 he received the Kerala Sahitya Akademi Award for Overall Contributions (2011).

== Biography ==
Joseph was born on May 23, 1939, in Vyttila in present-day Eranakulam district of Kerala. He was born as the fifth of nine children of Pappachan and Anastasia of the Ayathuparambil family, an old Latin Catholic family in Vyttila.

In early years, Joseph was an expert in constructing ring wells. His routine involved well-digging during the day and writing novels at night.

He authored the book Ashramam based on his experiences while residing at Swami Nirmalananda's ashram. He passed his SSLC examination from St. Rita's High School, Ponnurunni, and pursued further studies at the Chalakudy ITI. Throughout his career, he worked in various roles, including attendant, clerk, proof-reader, accountant, and editor and was also employed at the Samastha Kerala Sahithya Parishad Press.

=== Personal life and death ===
Joseph was married to Elizabeth. While in the ninth grade, Elizabeth developed an interest in Joseph after reading his novel Ashramam. Her admiration for him grew over time, although she had never met him at the time. The couple had three children, John William, who works as a music teacher, Deepa Joseph, a teacher at Kumbalangi SH High School, and Aparna Joseph. He died on January 9, 2024, while undergoing treatment following a stroke, at a private hospital in Kochi. Funeral was held at Vyttila St. Raphael Church. He died before completing his novel that incorporated autobiographical elements and the history of Kochi.

== Contributions ==
Joseph began his writing career at the age of 18 by publishing the work Charamavarshikam. After that he published works like Pavangalude Panchali, Ashramam, and Papankeerthanam in the following year. He had published 15 novels, 5 collections of stories, and 2 plays. The novel Bharathanatanam based on the life and contributions of playwright P. J. Antony was written after six years of research and study. Nithyavismayathode was his latest published novel.

Joseph started a theatre troupe named 'Navadarshana', but it was not successful. The troupe's play, 'Amavasi', was directed by Ramu Kariat. Later, he wrote the screenplay for the film 'Chemmeinkettu', directed by Vijayan Karott; however, the film was never released due to financial difficulties. He also worked as an assistant director on the film 'Mudra', directed by Sibi Malayil.

Joseph also served as the editor of the Samayam magazine published by the Christian Service Society.

== Selected Works ==
- Joseph Vyttila; Joshy George. Bharathanadanam (in Malayalam) (1st ed.). Mathrubhumi Books. ISBN 9789359625881. Novel based on life of actor P. J. Antony.
- Pavangalute Panchali [Panchali of the poor] (in Malayalam) (1st ed.). Mathrubhumi Books. ISBN 81-8264-237-X. Novel.
- Snehathinte murivukal [Wounds of love] (in Malayalam) (1st ed.). Mathrubhumi Books. ISBN 81-8264-266-3. Novel.
- Ashramam [Ashram] (in Malayalam) (1st ed.). Sahithya Pravarthaka Co-operative Society. Novel.
- Peeditharude Sankeethanam [Psalm of the Oppressed] (in Malayalam) (1st ed.). Sahithya Pravarthaka Co-operative Society. Novel.
- Swargam Thanirangi Vararulla oru kudil [A hut where heaven descends to earth.] (in Malayalam) (1st ed.). Saikatham Books. 1 January 2016. ISBN 978-9382909606. A collection of twelve short stories.

== Awards and honours ==
In 2012, Joseph Vyttila received the lifetime achievement award from Kerala Sahitya Akademi. He was the recipient in literature category of 2017 KRLCC Award presented annually by the Kerala Region Latin Catholic Council (KRLCC), the apex policy-making body of the Latin Catholic community in Kerala.

== Legacy ==
While inaugurating the first death anniversary memorial meeting of him organized by the Chavara Cultural Centre, theatre personality T. M. Abraham remarked that Joseph Vyttila, who remained truthful throughout his entire life, was an individual who dedicated his life to literature. At this event, the winner of the short story competition organized by the Thaikkudam Parish Laity Commission in his memory was also announced.
