= Federation of Kerala Associations in North America =

Federation Of Kerala Associations In North America (FOKANA)
- Abbreviation: FOKANA
- Formation: July 4, 1983
- Type: A Non-profit, Educational, Linguistic and Cultural Organization
- Region served: America
- Official language: Malayalam, English

The Federation Of Kerala Associations In North America (FOKANA) is an umbrella organization formed on July 4, 1983, in New York City to unite all Kerala/Malayali organizations of the American continent. It was during the seventies that many Malayali organizations started to show up all over United States and Canada. Thus, there was a need to unite all these organizations under a single roof. In 1982, under the initiative of Dr. M. Anirudhan, a preliminary meeting was held in Washington D.C., which was chaired by the then Indian Ambassador to United States K.R. Narayanan. This meeting initiated the forming of this organization. Later in 1983, the first Kerala Convention was held in New York city. Personalities like Dr. Syed Muhammaed, the then Indian High Commissioner in London and Mr. Vayalar Ravi, the then-Home Minister of Kerala attended the convention. This convention, through the active efforts of many prominent Keralites, founded the present organization. The 2020-22 President is Georgy Varughese. The international convention will be held in Orlando, Fl on July 7–10, 2022.

The current President (2024–2026) is Dr. Sajimon Antony. He was elected along with Sreekumar Unnithan as General Secretary and Joy Chakkappan as Treasurer, under the slogan DreamTeam Dream Projects.

== See also ==
- All Malaysia Malayalee Association
- Confederation of Tamil Nadu Malayalee Associations
