= David Lim (mountaineer) =

Singaporean mountaineer and motivational speaker

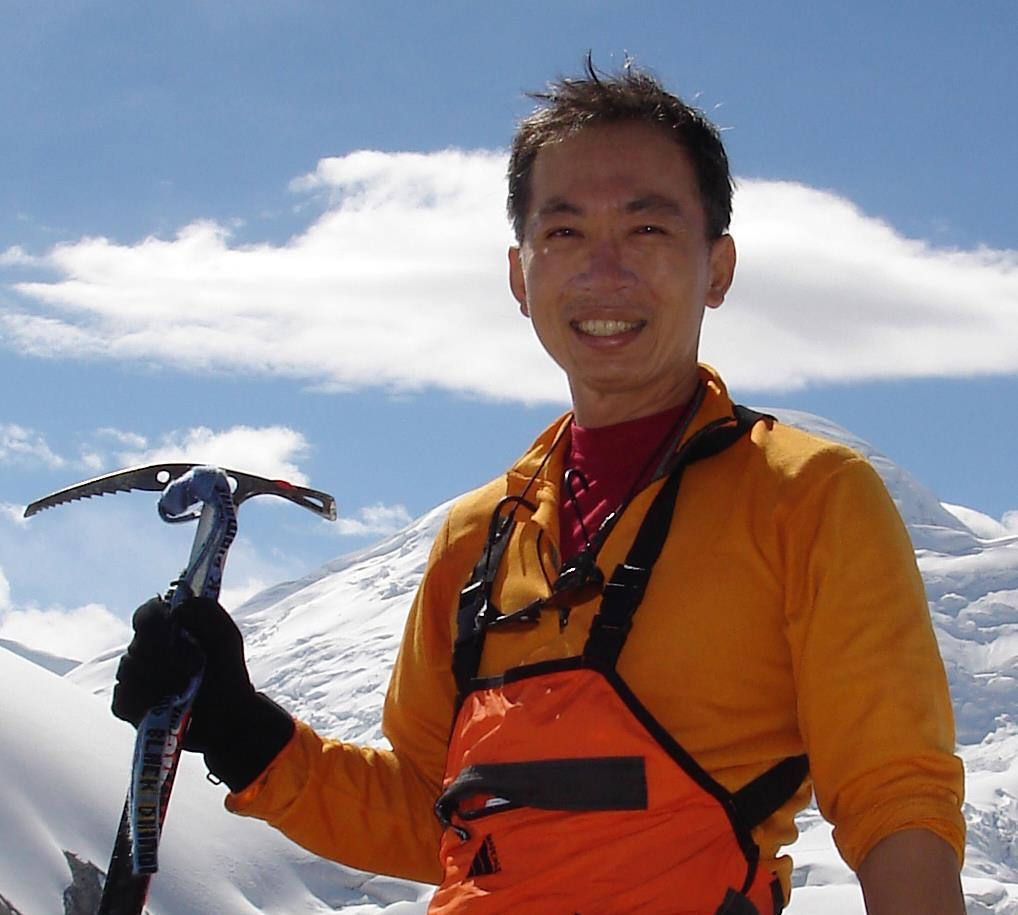
David Lim on the summit of a virgin peak (later named Temasek Peak) in the Tien Shan range, 2005

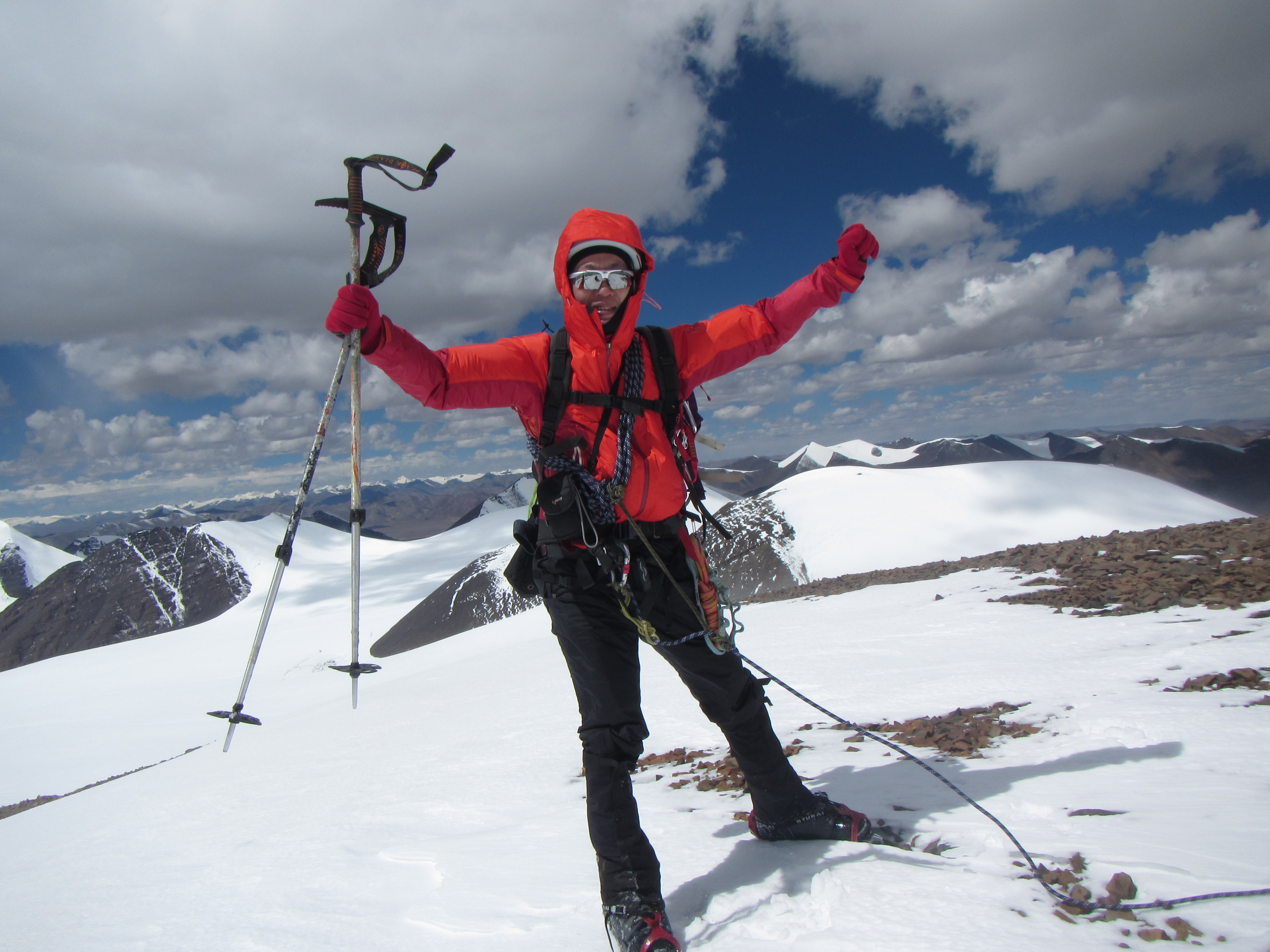
David Lim on the summit of Sangay Ri, 6000m. Photo by Mohamed Rozani bin Maarof, climbing partner of the QInghai virgin peaks climb 2012

David Lim (born 1964) is a Singaporean mountaineer and motivational speaker who led the first Singapore Mount Everest Expedition in 1998. Between 1994 and 1998, he led and organised a team from the flat tropical island nation to the top of Everest. Over series of expeditions and technical climbs in New Zealand, India and Nepal in preparation for the climb; he and his team climbed various 6000-metre,7000-metre and 8000-metre peaks including Putha Hiunchuli (7246m, 1996), and Cho Oyu (8201m, 1997). Sustaining an injury on the 1998 Everest summit push, he did not make the summit himself though two other team members succeeded in making the top on May 25, 1998. A week after his return, and not related to the climb, he was stricken with Guillain–Barré syndrome, a rare nerve disorder where the immune system attacks the peripheral nerves. Paralysed from eyes down, he spent six months in hospitals, and emerged partially disabled in both legs.

He returned to mountaineering, and since 1999, has led more than 15 expeditions, including the first all-Singapore ascent of Argentina's Aconcagua (6962m), and the world's third solo of Ojos del Salado, the highest volcano in the world (6893m). In summer 2005, he led the first Southeast Asian team to climb virgin peaks in the Tien Shan mountain range on the Kazakh-Kyrgyz border. The team summitted three peaks, now officially recognised as Temasek, Singapura, and Ong Teng Cheong peaks. In 2009, he formed another team for the Tien Shan, summitting three more virgin peak, the highest and hardest being Majulah Peak (5152m). His 2012 virgin peaks expedition was to the Qinghai region of China. Lim and his fellow mountaineer partner, Mohammed Rozani bin Maarof, summitted a 6000-metre virgin peak and named it Sangay Ri. Most of these lightweight, alpine-style ascents were achieved without the use of high-altitude porters, or professional guides. In 2016, he attempted a 4 km ridge traverse encompassing two virgin peaks in the Manang region in Nepal; and continues to climbs and ski worldwide.

Lim has a B.A. in Law from Cambridge University. He has also authored four books, Mountain to Climb: The Quest for Everest and Beyond and Against Giants: The Life and Climbs of a Disabled Mountaineer, both published by Epigram Books. His subsequent books, How Leaders Lead: 71 Lessons in Leading Yourself & Others (2011) , and "Lessons from the Edge (2023)" were self-published.

Lim is owner of a leadership and coaching consultancy (Everest Motivation Team Pte Ltd) and has delivered programmes and keynote presentations in 83 cities and 34 countries since 1999, combining experiences in leadership in the mountains with corporate models; and delivering presentations and workshops around the world. His leadership and team simulation, Everest Challenger® - .® has been licensed in 18 countries, and is the first tabletop simulation of climbing Mt Everest, designed for adult learning outcomes. He earned the Certified Speaking Professional (CSP) credential in 2009, making him the first Singaporean to acquire this amongst the 600 CSPs in the 6000-strong Global Speaker Federation. In 2013, together with 30 leading global speakers, he received the designation of CSPGlobal (now known as the Global Speaking Fellow)
