= Confederation of Tamil Nadu Malayalee Associations =

CTMA
- Confederation of Tamil Nadu Malayalee Associations
- Formation: 1989
- Founder: M P Purushothaman, K V Nair, Gokulam Gopalan
- Founded at: Chennai
- Type: Nonprofit
- Purpose: A non-profit educational, Linguistic, Cultural and Charity organization
- Headquarters: Chennai
- Region served: Tamil Nadu, India
- Official language: Malayalam
- Website: https://www.myctma.org

The Confederation of Tamil Nadu Malayalee Associations, abbreviated CTMA, was formed on 12 November 1989 to bring all registered organisations of Malayalis in Tamil Nadu under a single roof so that a collective entity could be formed. The purpose of the organisation is to work out solutions to problems faced by Malayalis and to project and popularize the cultural and social identity of their native flavours in a different geographical area. CTMA is a conglomerate comprising over 100 Malayali associations across Tamil Nadu. It is involved in social activism, social support mediation and interventions on behalf of Malayalis, educational support services, and advisory and counselling services to the needy and the poor irrespective of their religious affinities or their economic/social status and look after the interests of the members as also to interact socially and culturally with the local population.

== Achievements ==
CTMA appealed for the Government of Tamil Nadu government to declare Onam as a public holiday and was partially successful: it is now declared as a public holiday in four districts of the state.
