= Leo Oracion =

Filipino mountaineer and sportsman

Leo Oración
- Born: Heracleo Salumbides Oración; 1974 (age 51–52); Lucban, Quezon, Philippines
- Occupation: Mountaineer
- Known for: The first Filipino to reach the summit of Mount Everest
- Spouse: Vanessa Laurence
- Children: Leamari Angela Oración; Kalayaan "Kaya" Oración; Lakan Tao Oración

Heracleo "Leo" Salumbides Oración OL (born 1974) is a Filipino mountaineer and sportsman widely recognized as the first Filipino to reach the summit of Mount Everest on May 17, 2006, at the age of 32. He reached the summit at 3:30 p.m. (local time), together with 15 other climbers.

== Early life ==
Oración was born in the town of Lucbán in Quezon Province, Philippines. He is from Salumbides-Oracion Clan. The town where the Salumbides-Oracion family originates and where many of its members, including Leo Oracion, were born and raised.

Prior to climbing Mount Everest, he worked as a lifeguard at the Shangri-La Hotel in Mactan Island, Cebu. He quit his job to pursue his passion full-time. Aside from being a mountaineer, he is also a triathlete who has won various adventure races.

He and fellow Mount Everest summiteer Erwin Emata are also enlisted officers of the Philippine Coast Guard. He is also a member of the triathlon team, Coast Guard-Sandugo, which placed second in the Philippine adventure race, the Carrera Habagat.

== Everest expedition ==
Oración was a member of the First Philippine Mount Everest Expedition, whose quest to conquer Everest was supported by the ABS-CBN television network, among other entities. On May 13, 2006, Oración left Base Camp and proceeded up the mountain. He reached the summit on the afternoon of May 17. Upon reaching the top, Oración radioed, "The Philippine Eagle has landed." His statement is based on Neil Armstrong's message "The Eagle has landed" when the Apollo 11 Lunar Module, nicknamed the "Eagle", landed on the moon. The following day, May 18, fellow expedition member Emata became the second Filipino to reach the summit of Mount Everest.

Upon conclusion of his ascent, Nepal's Ministry of Culture, Tourism and Civil Aviation awarded Oración with a summit certificate which indicated his Mount Everest summit ascent on May 17 via the south col. EverestNews.com also reported Oración's successful summit feat on its website.

Oración's status as the first Filipino to reach the summit of Mount Everest has been challenged by another Filipino climber, Dale Abenojar, who claims to have reached the summit from the northern side on May 15 — two days before Oración. Abenojar's claim has been registered in Mount Everest chronicler Elizabeth Hawley's Himalayan Database. Abenojar also presented a certificate which claimed that he was certified by the China Tibet Mountaineering Association (CTMA) to have summited Everest via the North Col on May 15, 2006, at 10:45 a.m. Beijing time (or 8:45 a.m. Nepal time). However, he was not among the climbers that EverestNews.com reported to have summited the mountain from the northern side on that date.

== See also ==
- Dale Abenojar
- Erwin Emata
- Romeo Garduce
