= Romi Garduce =

Filipino mountaineer (born 1969)

- Born: Romeo Roberto Garduce; 1969 (age 56–57); Balanga, Bataan, Philippines
- Other names: Garduch
- Occupations: Mountaineer, scuba dive master, writer, motivational speaker, TV host, IT professional,
- Known for: First Filipino to climb the Seven Summits
- Website: https://www.romigarduce.blogspot.com/

Romeo Roberto "Romi" Garduce (born 1969 in Balanga, Bataan), sometimes nicknamed as "Garduch," is a Filipino mountaineer, a scuba dive master (since 2000), an environmentalist, writer, motivational speaker and works as an IT professional. He began climbing mountains for a cause in 1991 as a member of the UP Mountaineers. Aside from being a mountain climber and IT professional, he became one of the host for the GMA Network public affair shows Born to Be Wild and Pinoy Meets World. He also hosted the GMA News and Public Affairs special entitled Pito Para sa Pilipino (Seven for the Filipinos) with Richard Gutierrez.

Romi wrote and published his first book in October 2013, entitled Akyat! A Filipino's Journey to the Seven Summits. The book chronicled his adventures and major climbs and expeditions. Akyat is a Filipino word that simply means "climb".

After reaching the summit of Kilimanjaro in 2002, Garduce became the first Filipino to climb one of the Seven Summits. On September 26, 2005, Romi Garduce became the first Filipino to ascend Cho Oyu, a death zone peak at 8,000 metres (26,000 ft), then the highest mountain peak scaled by a Filipino. That record was broken by Leo Oracion on May 17, 2006, when he was the first to reach the peak of Mount Everest, the highest mountain on Earth, and planted the Filipino flag. Garduce reached the summit of Everest on May 19, 2006. Due to Garduce's feat, he was awarded an Order of Lakandula - Special Class of Champion for Life by then Philippine President Gloria Macapagal Arroyo as well as one of The Outstanding Young Man (TOYM) of 2006 for his feats and service to community work.

Garduce is the first, and to-date the only Filipino, who has climbed all Seven Summits, or the highest mountains in all continents following both Bass and Messner Seven Summits list.

== Early life ==
Born in 1969, Garduce hails from the municipality of Balanga in the province of Bataan in the Philippines. His father originally comes from Catarman, Northern Samar and worked all his life at Subic. He finished high school at Tomas del Rosario College and graduated Bachelor of Science in Mathematics major in Computer Science from University of Santo Tomas in 1989.

== Climbing career ==
He became a mountaineer after joining UP Mountaineers in 1991.

On January 1, 2005, he was the first Filipino to climb the highest mountain outside Asia and the highest mountain in the Americas, Mt. Aconcagua, which was then the highest altitude reach by any Filipino. On September 26, 2005, Romi Garduce became the first Filipino to top out an 8000m peak, Cho Oyu, then the highest mountain scaled by a Filipino. On May 19, 2006, he climbed the summit of Mount Everest, his third Seven Summits Peak after Kilimanjaro and Aconcagua.

Garduce attempted to reach the peak of Mount Everest in an expedition sponsored by GMA Network concurrently with Leo Oracion's team, the First Philippine Mount Everest Expedition (FPMEE) and principally sponsored by ABS-CBN. On May 19, 2006, Garduce reached the summit of Mount Everest from the south ridge after Leo Oracion and Erwin Emata.

After the Filipinos successfully reached Everest's peak, Sir Edmund Hillary, the first man to step in the peak of Everest, was interviewed by GMA Network in his Auckland home. He congratulated the three Filipino men (Romi, Leo and Erwin) for their determination and gave his greatest respect to the Filipino expedition team. The Himalayan Database published by American Alpine Club had included Romi Garduce in the list of Everest South summiters for 2006.

On August 25, 2007, Garduce reached the summit of Mount Elbrus (18,510 foot-high or 5,642 meters), Europe's highest peak located in the Caucasus mountain range within Russia's boundaries and the fourth of the Seven Summits that he reached.

On June 6, 2008, 9:30pm Philippine Standard Time, Romi Garduce reached the summit of Denali, Alaska, making his fifth summit among the Seven Summits. Denali is the highest peak in North America. Only three out of their 9-man team made it to the Denali summit. Garduce climbed with a team from the American Alpine Institute (AAI).

After Denali, Romi went on the climb Mount Kosciuszko, Australia in 2009 and Carstensz Pyramid, Indonesia in 2011 with another Filipino, Levi Nayahangan. Finally, Garduce completed the Seven Summits of the seven continents of the world last January 6, 2012 when he reached the peak of Vinson Massif in Antarctica.

In November 2014, Romi completed his personal quest to "day-climb" Philippines' top five highest peaks, a project he called "5 peaks in 5 days." In 2015, he also climbed Makiling, a mountain in Laguna, Philippines, to prepare for his climb on Mount Ama Dablam in Nepal.

== Writing and other careers ==
Aside from being a mountaineer, Garduce is a scuba diver master, an environmentalist, writer, motivational speaker, an IT professional, and a TV host. He works at Procter and Gamble (Philippines) as systems manager of the financial reporting unit in the P&G office at Petron Megaplaza, Makati. In 2006, Garduce became one of the hosts for Pinoy Meets World and, in 2007, he became one of the original presenters for the travel and wildlife show Born to Be Wild with veterinarian Ferdinand Recio. He appeared at one of the episodes of the children's educational show Art Angel. He also hosted the special entitled Pito Para sa Pilipino (Seven for the Filipinos) with Richard Gutierrez.

In October 2013, Romi launched his first book entitled Akyat! A Filipino's Journey to the Seven Summits at the Bonifacio High Street in Bonifacio Global City. Akyat means "climb" in Filipino. The book tells his mountain climbing adventures and struggles as a mountain climber. He hoped to inspire people through his book. In September 2015, Garduce became a global ambassador for Johnnie Walker and appeared in the said whiskey's commercial. In November 2015, Garduce briefly returned in Born to be Wild as guest host. In the episodes that he appeared, Garduce went to Mount Makiling as part of his training to climb Mount Ama Dablam in the Himalayas.

== Awards ==
- Garduce was given the Order of Lakandula with Special Class of Champion for Life in 2006 by then President Gloria Macapagal-Arroyo.
- He was also named as one of The Outstanding Young Man (TOYM) of 2006 for his achievements and for serving the community.
- Garduce, Oracion and Emata were featured on postage stamps in November 2006 issued by the Philippine Postage Corporation to honor their feats.
- In 2017, he was one of the inaugural awardees of the History Maker Award by the History Channel.

== Filmography ==
Television
Year	Title	Role
2012	Pito para sa Pilipino	Host
2007, 2015	Born to be Wild	Host
2006	Pinoy Meets World	Himself-Host
2006	Art Angel	Himself

== See also ==
- Leo Oracion
- Erwin Emata
