= Atal Bihari Vajpayee Institute of Mountaineering and Allied Sports =

Mountaineering institute in Manali, Himachal Pradesh, India

Coordinates: 32.232°N 77.192°E

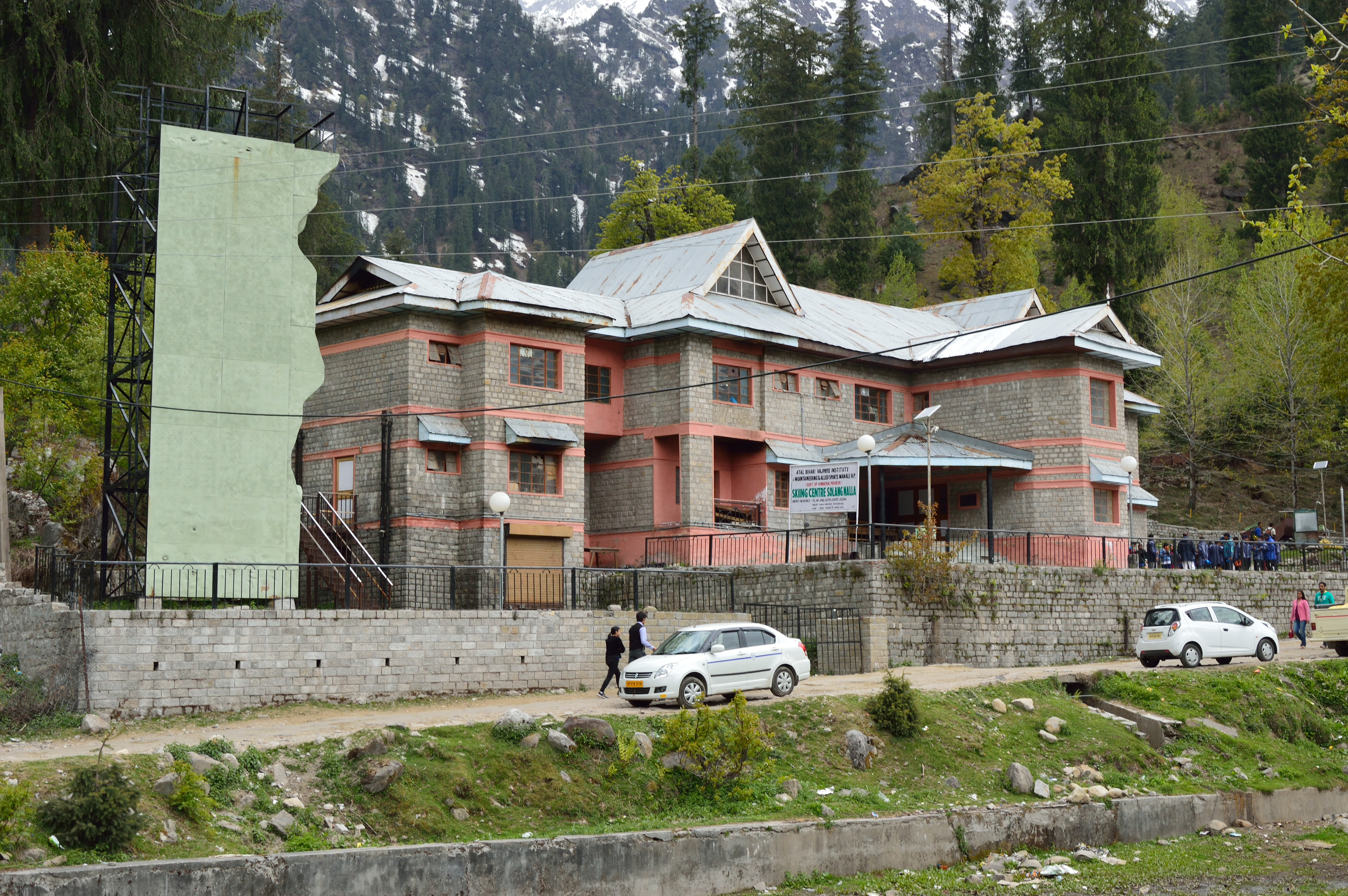
Skiing Centre - Atal Bihari Vajpayee Institute of Mountaineering and Allied Sports - Solang Valley, Kullu

Atal Bihari Vajpayee Institute of Mountaineering and Allied Sports (abbreviated to ABVIMAS) is an Indian institute, which provides specialized training in skiing, mountain rescue and mountaineering, founded in 1961. The institute is located in Manali, Himachal Pradesh.

== History ==
In 1961, it was set up as the Western Himalayan Mountaineering Institute, but later it was renamed in 2008 after former PM of India, Atal Bihari Vajpayee. In 2017, the institute formed an MOU with Swarnim Gujarat Sports University for collaborative training.

== Courses ==
ABVIMAS offers mountaineering, skiing and water sports courses.

- Basic Mountaineering Course
- Advance Mountaineering Course
- Method of Instruction (Mountaineering) Course
- Advance Skiing Course
- Method of Instruction (Skiing) Course
- Intermediate Water Sports Course (White Water Kayaking) & Advance Water Sports Course (Sailing)
- Intermediate water Sports Course
- Advance Water Sports Course (White Water Kayaking)
- Advance Water Sports
- Method of Instruction (Water Sports Course)
- Trained Trainers of Advance Mountaineering Course

== See also ==
- Mountaineering in India
