= Bara-lacha la =

Mountain pass in Himachal Pradesh, India

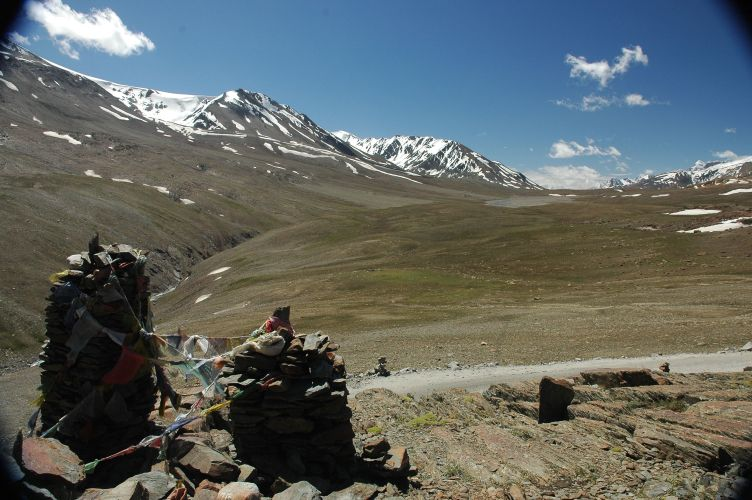
- Bara-lacha la

- Location within Himachal Pradesh
- Interactive map of Bara-lacha la
- Elevation: 4,850 m (15,910 ft)
- Traversed by: Leh–Manali Highway

Third Approach
- Location: India
- Range: Himalaya
- Coordinates: 32°45′31″N 77°25′13″E

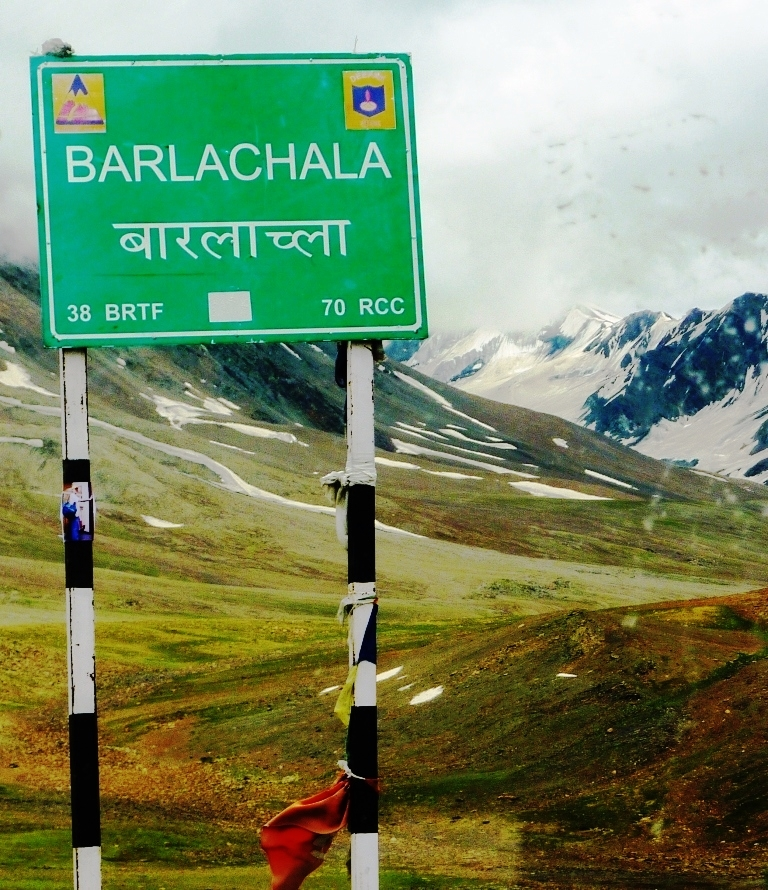
Baralachala signpost

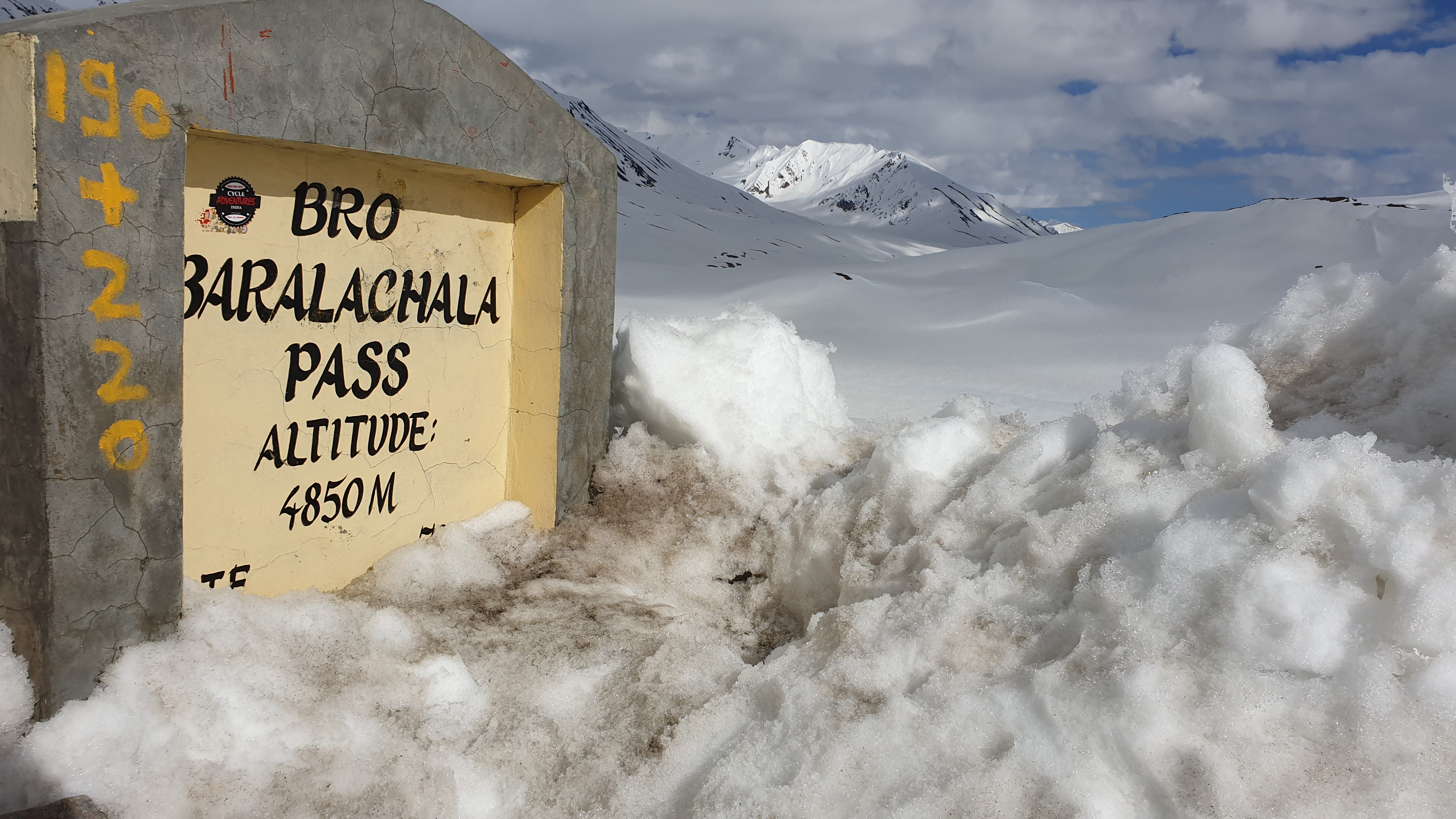
Baralacha Top Signpost with Snow-capped peaks in the background.

Bara-lacha la also known as Bara-lacha Pass, or Bārā Lācha La, (el. 16,040 ft or 4,889 m) is a high mountain pass in the Zanskar range of Northern-India, connecting Lahaul district in Himachal Pradesh to Leh district in Ladakh. Rail-cum-road tunnels are being constructed under the Bara-lacha la, at 16,040 feet (4,890 m) high Lungalacha La (84 km north of Bara-lacha la) and 5,184 metres (17,008 ft) high Taglang La (171 km north of Bara-lacha la) to cater to the traffic on the existing NH3 Leh–Manali Highway and the under-construction Bhanupli–Leh line.

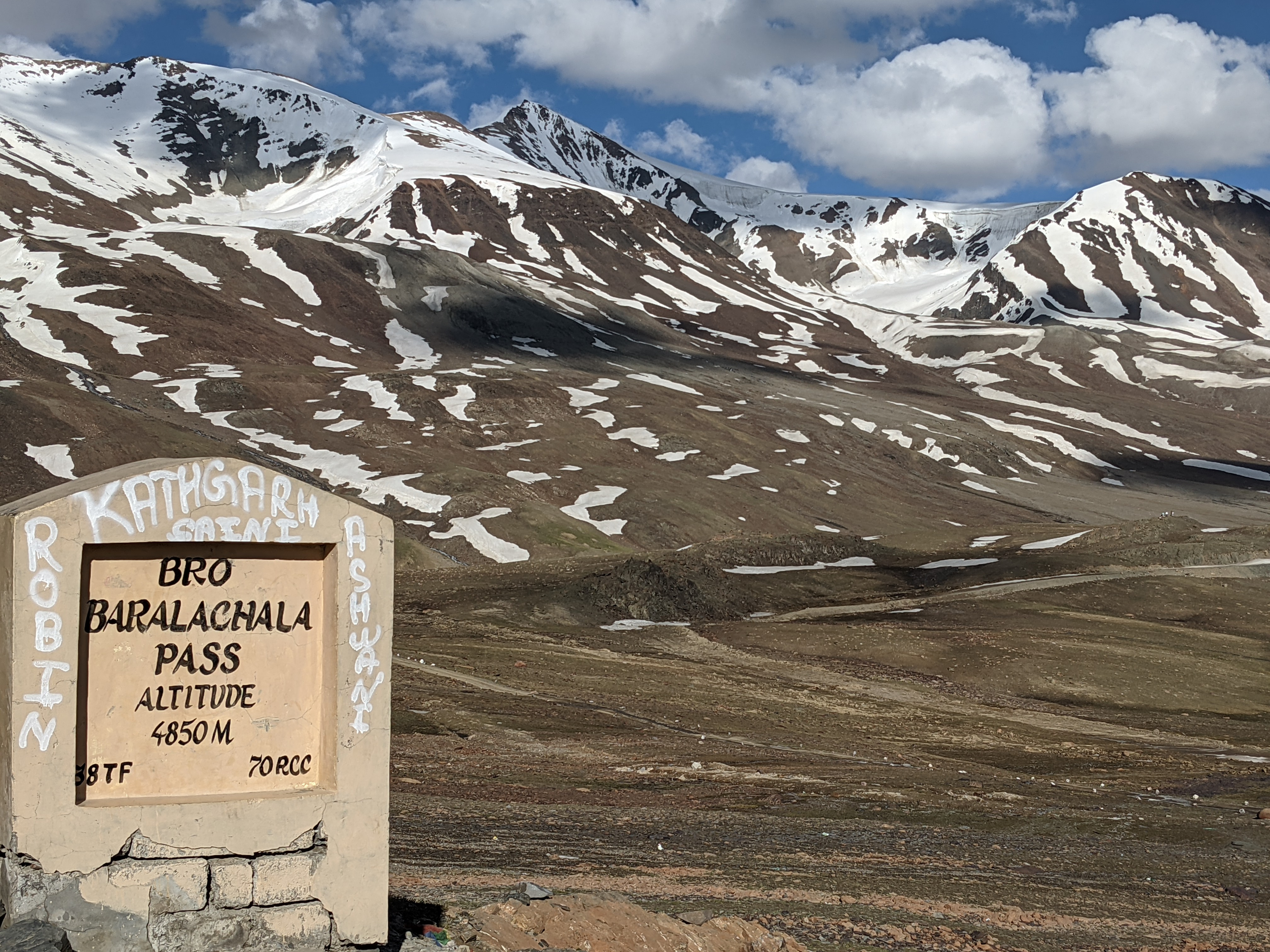
View of Bara-lacha La Top during Monsoon with melting snow.

The two headwaters of the Chenab River, Chandra and Bhaga, originate near the Baralacha Pass. The Bhaga river originates from Surya taal lake, which is situated a few of kilometres from the pass towards Manali. The Chandra originates from a glacier in this region. The native name of Chenab, "Chandrabhaga", represents the union of Chandra and Bhaga rivers downstream.

The pass also acts as a water-divide between the Bhaga river and the Yunam river.

== Legend ==
Folklore states that the two divine lovers, Chandramukhi, daughter of the Moon god, and Surya Bhaga, the son of the Sun god, decided to perform their eternal marriage atop the Bara-lacha-la. From there they ran in opposite directions. Chandra being active and smart, easily found her way and reached Tandi after covering the distance of 115 km (71 mi).

Soon Bhaga was found coming with great struggle through the narrow gorges to Tandi, where consequently, they both met and the celestial marriage was performed. Bhaga covered about 60 km (37 mi) distance, which was very difficult.

== Geography ==
Cross roads from Spiti, Ladakh, Zanskar and Lahaul meet at the Baralacha Pass. In ancient times it was part of a trade route. On the northwest originates the Bhaga River while the Chandra flows south-east. Below the Baralacha-la is an emerald lake, the Suraj tal (Sun lake), the source of the river Bhaga.

"Mr. Shaw thus describes the region:

"The Bara Lacha is the boundary between two separate regions distinguished by their physical characteristics. That which we have already passed through may be called the true Himalayan region. Here the gigantic ranges are covered with perpetual snow, furrowed by glaciers, and they arise from amid dense forests which clothe their flanks up to a certain elevation. They are separated by deep gorges, whose sides are precipices, and though which large rivers flow. In fact the scenery is Alpine.

Henceforward, however, we must bear in mind that we are in the barren or Tibetan region, where green spots are about as rare as islands in the ocean, and universal gravel is the rule."

== In popular culture ==
In Rudyard Kipling's novel Kim, there is a reference to Bara-lacha la pass the source of the Suraj Tal having been used by Kim's Lama to enter India from Tibet.

== Tourism and trekking ==
A trekking route leads from Bara-lacha la to Chandra Taal, situated by the bank of Chandra River in the Spiti Valley. In about a week's time, trekking in this region involves camping and walking at reasonably high altitude, and crossing a few glacial rivers. The basic day wise itinerary that trekkers can follow is:

1. Manali (2000 m) - Batal (3907 m) drive
2. Batal (3907 m) - Chandrataal (4300 m) hike
3. Chandrataal (4300 m) - Tokpo Gongma (4320 m) hike
4. Tokpo Gongma (4320 m) - Tokpo Yongma (4640 m) hike
5. Tokpo Yongma (4640 m) - Baralacha La (4900 m) - Manali

== Gallery ==
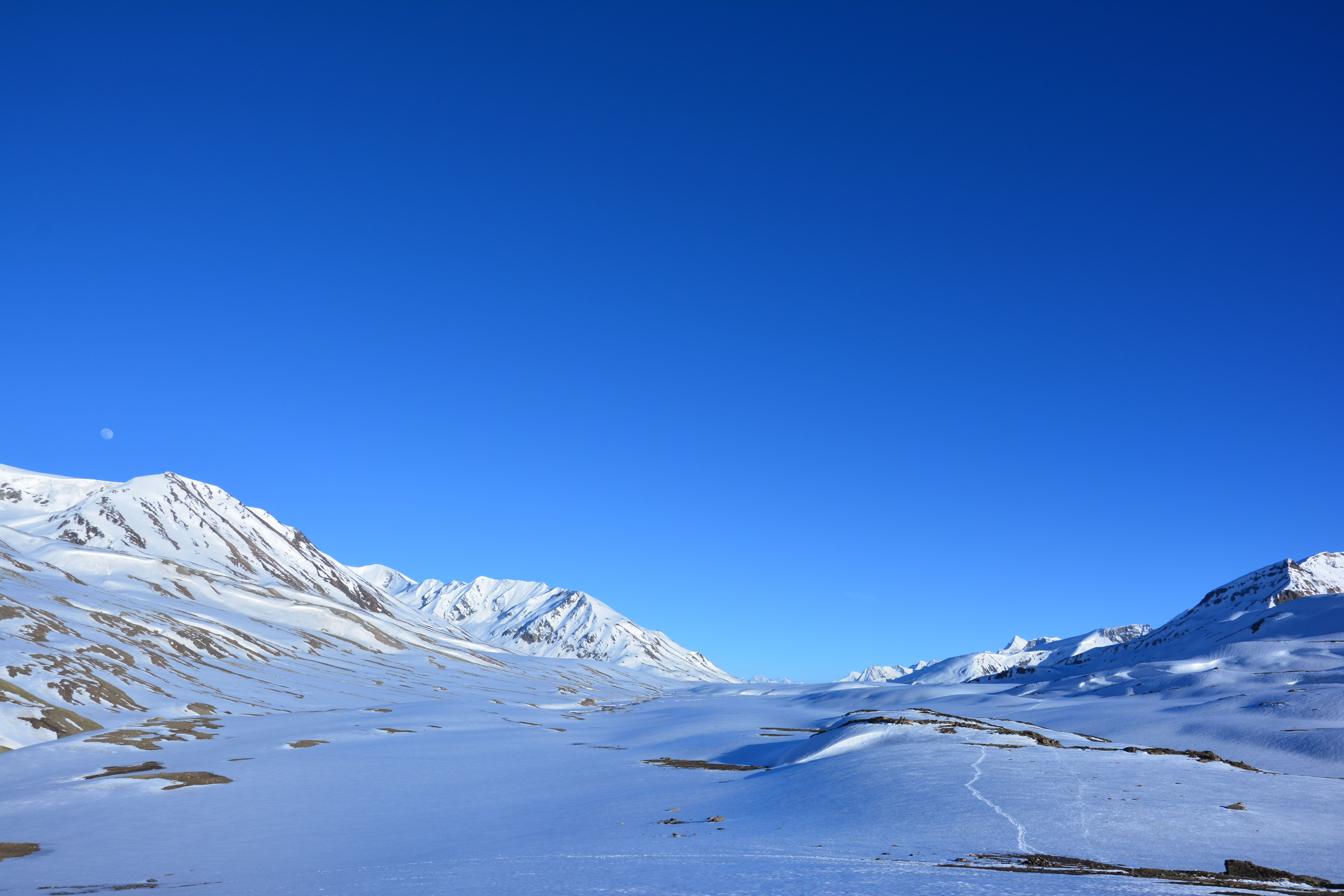
View of Bara-lacha la in June

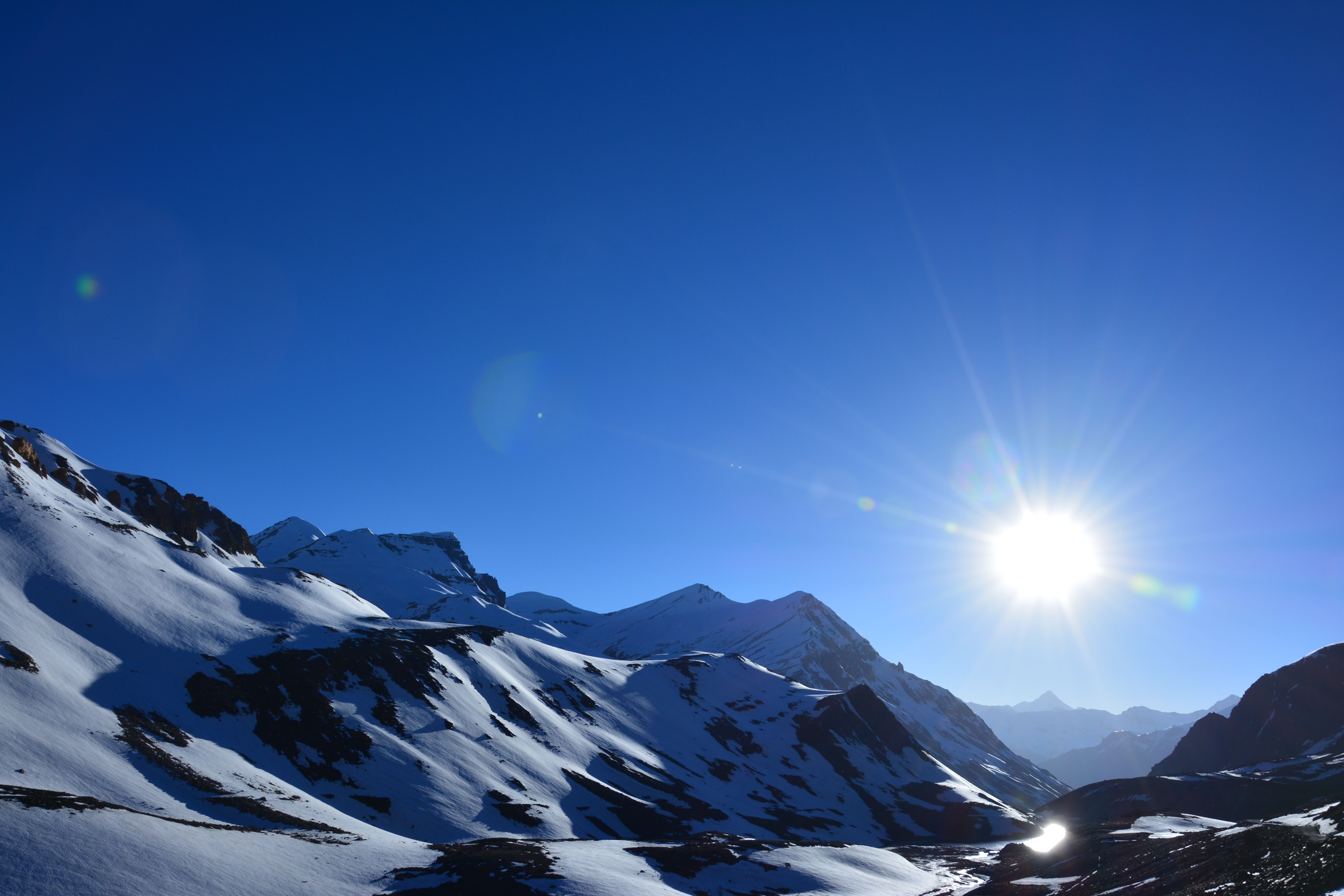
Bright Sunny day at Bara-lacha la

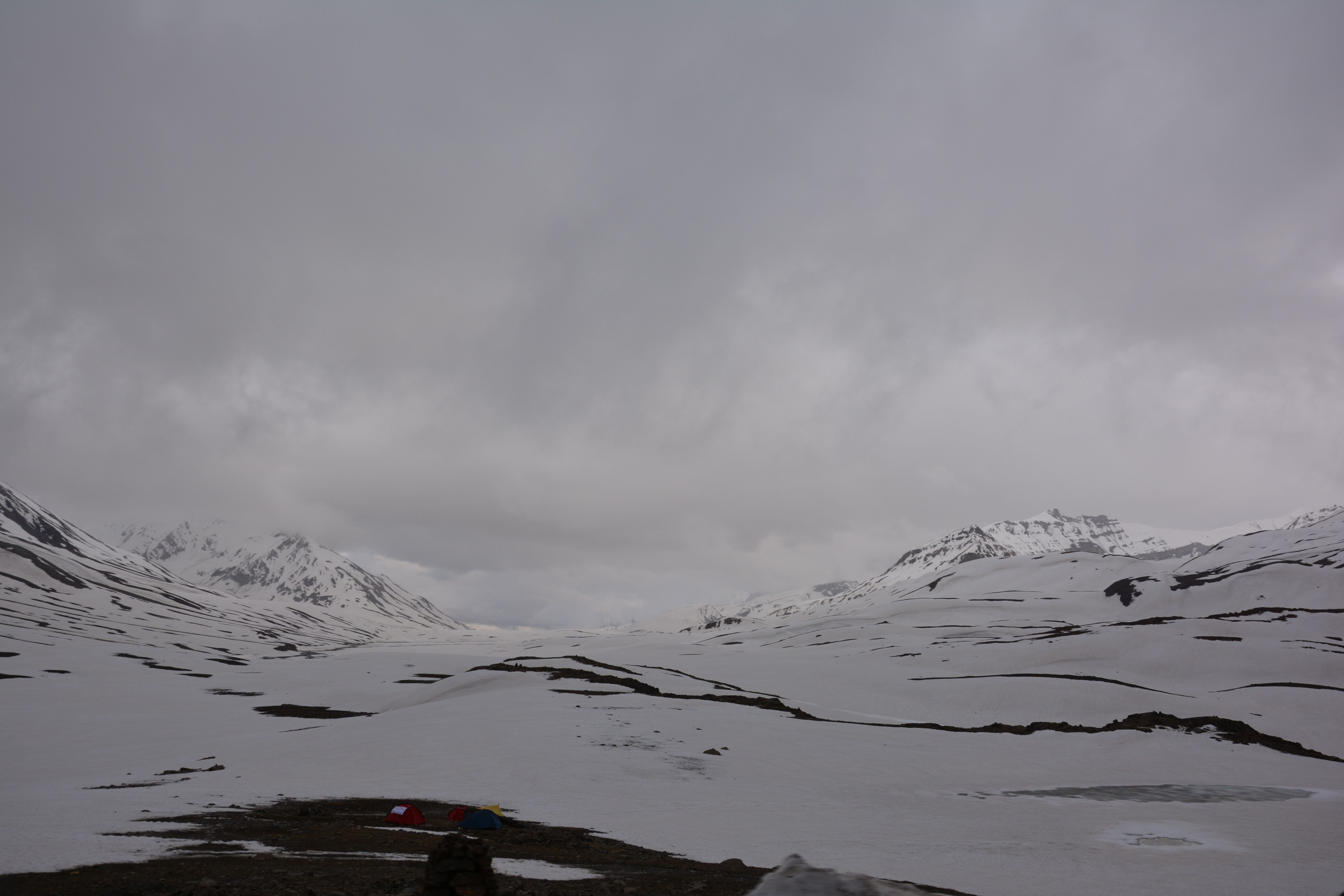
Bara-lacha la snow-covered mountain

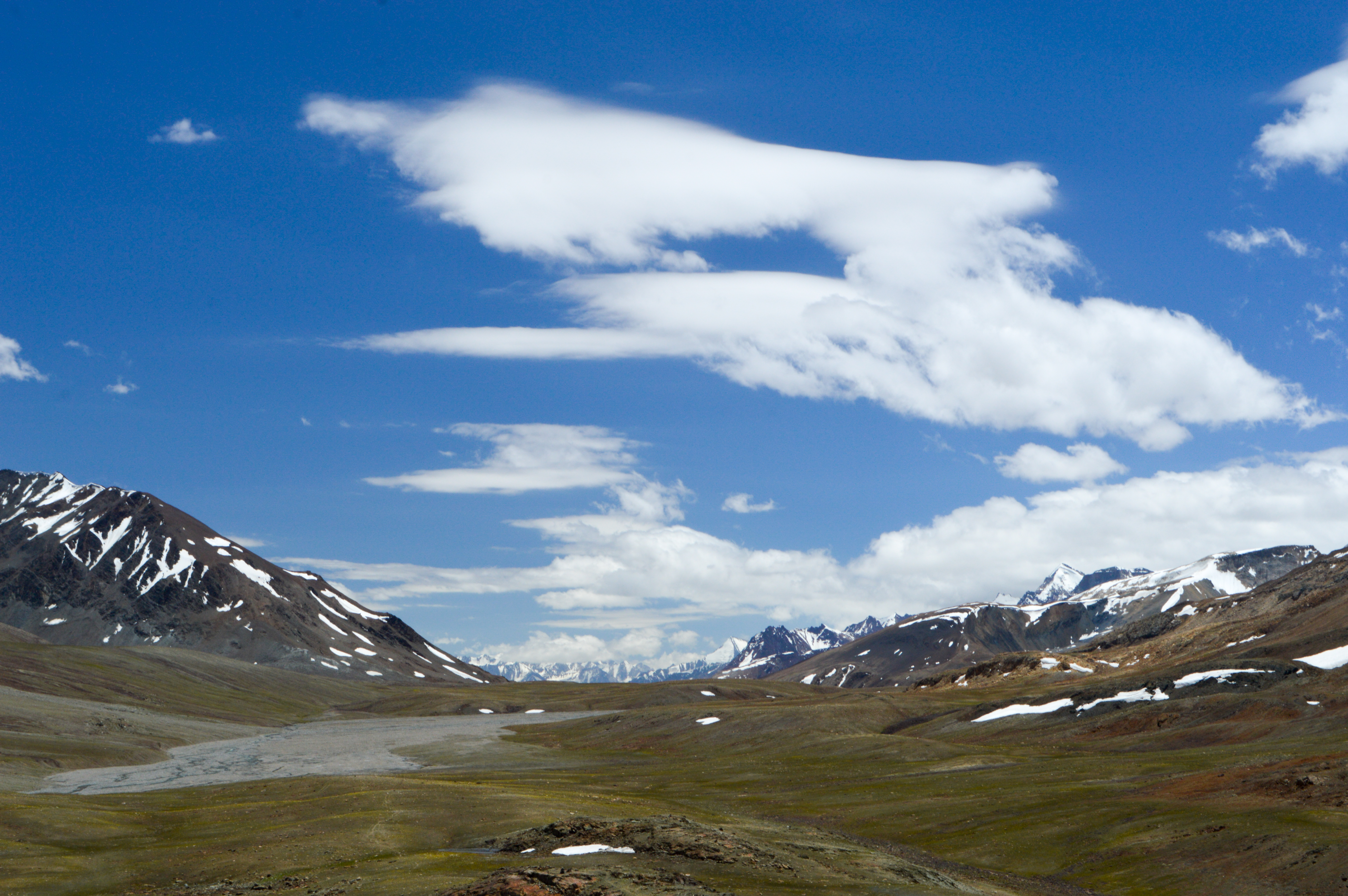
Baralacha La looking towards Chandra Taal, July 2016

== See also ==
- Geography of Ladakh
- India-China Border Roads
- List of mountain passes of India
