= Erwin Emata =

Filipino mountain climber

- Born: Erwin Emata; 1973 or 1974 (age 51–52); Makilala, Philippines
- Other name: Pastor
- Occupations: Mountaineer, runner
- Known for: The second Filipino to reach the summit of Mount Everest
- Spouse: Mary Ann
- Children: 1
- Awards: Order of Lakandula (2007)

Erwin "Pastor" Emata OL (born ca. 1973/1974 in Makilala, North Cotabato) is a mountaineer and a runner from the Philippines. In 2006, he became the second Filipino to climb Mount Everest. His achievement was recognized by then Philippine President Gloria Macapagal-Arroyo when she conferred Emata with the Order of Lakandula with the special class of Champion for Life.

== Personal life ==
Erwin Emata was born in Makilala, North Cotabato. He grew up near the foot of Mount Apo. He graduated high school at Santa Cruz, Davao del Sur and then went to college in Davao City. He became a resident of Tagum and lives with his wife, Mary Ann, who is also a mountain climber. He has a son who became the youngest person to summit Mount Apo when they climbed it.

== Career ==
Erwin Emata is a mountaineer known for being the second Filipino to reach the peak of Mount Everest in 2006. Before that, in August 2005, Emata reached the peak of Muztagh Ata in Western Xinjiang, China. Emata is a member of the First Philippine Mount Everest Expedition (FPMEE) and the Marco Polo Mountaineering Club-Davao. He has also climbed popular peaks in Europe and Asia.

=== Climbing Mount Everest ===
On May 18, 2006, at 5:54 am, Erwin Emata reached the top of Mount Everest after leaving Camp 4 of Everest with a sherpa from Nepal at 9:45 pm (the previous day). Based on The Himalayan Database published by the American Alpine Club, Emata thereby became the second Filipino to reach the peak of Mount Everest, the highest mountain in the world.

The Himalayan Database published by American Alpine Club had included Leo Oracion in the list of Everest South summiteers for 2006 on May 17, officially recognizing him as the first Filipino on top of Mount Everest just one day before Emata. Emata was planned to be a backup just in case Oracion did not make it to the peak.

=== Later career ===
In 2008, Emata joined a six-man team to participate in the Hillary-Tenzing Mount Everest Marathon. He led the sporting event named Gov. Rodolfo R. del Rosario Cup Island to Highland Adventure Group Race on August 31, 2008. He also organized and participated in the Paradise Trail Run 2009 in Davao Region. In 2009, he climbed Mount Hamiguitan in Davao Oriental and described it as "paradise" as the mountain is the habitat of the Philippine eagle, which is critically endangered.

He also became part of the Balangay Expedition Team as they ride three boats that recollected the voyage of seafaring Filipinos during the period before the Spanish colonization of the Philippines. Then President Benigno Aquino III welcomed the expedition team in 2011 in Malacañang Palace as a courtesy call. In 2018, he was the chief race official and also one of the runners for the Mindanao Banana Farmers and Exporters Association Incorporated (MBFEA Inc.) Fun Run.

== Accolades ==
For being the second Filipino to reach the summit of Mount Everest, then President Gloria Macapagal-Arroyo granted the Order of Lakandula with a special class of Champion for Life. A senate resolution was also filed by senators Manny Villar and Dick Gordon honoring Emata and the rest of the Philippine Mount Everest Expedition Team. Then Vice President Noli de Castro and other senators congratulated Emata and the team.

The expedition team was also given the keys to the City of Manila by then Mayor Lito Atienza. Emata, a resident of Tagum City, was also commended by the city council of Tagum "for being one of the first Filipinos who successfully reached the highest peak of Mount Everest." The achievements of the top three first Filipino Everest peak climbers, which include Emata, are featured and honored on postage stamps issued by the Philippine Postal Corporation in November 2006.

== See also ==
- Leo Oracion
- Romi Garduce
