= China Tibet Mountaineering Association =

Chinese Mount Everest summitting authority

The China Tibet Mountaineering Association (also known as China Tibet Mountaineering Team) is the only authorized licensing authority of Everest summiteers on the northern Tibetan side of the mountain. In 2024, the China Tibet Mountaineering Association took possession of remains of Andrew Irvine found by a National Geographic expedition.
