= Grantha =

Grantha may refer to:

- Grantha script, a script formerly used in South India to write Sanskrit
- Grantha (Unicode block), a Unicode block containing the ancient Grantha script characters

== See also ==
- Guru Granth Sahib, the central religious scripture of Sikhism
  - Granthi, a reader of the scripture
