= Simplified Tamil script =

Several governmental reforms to the Tamil script

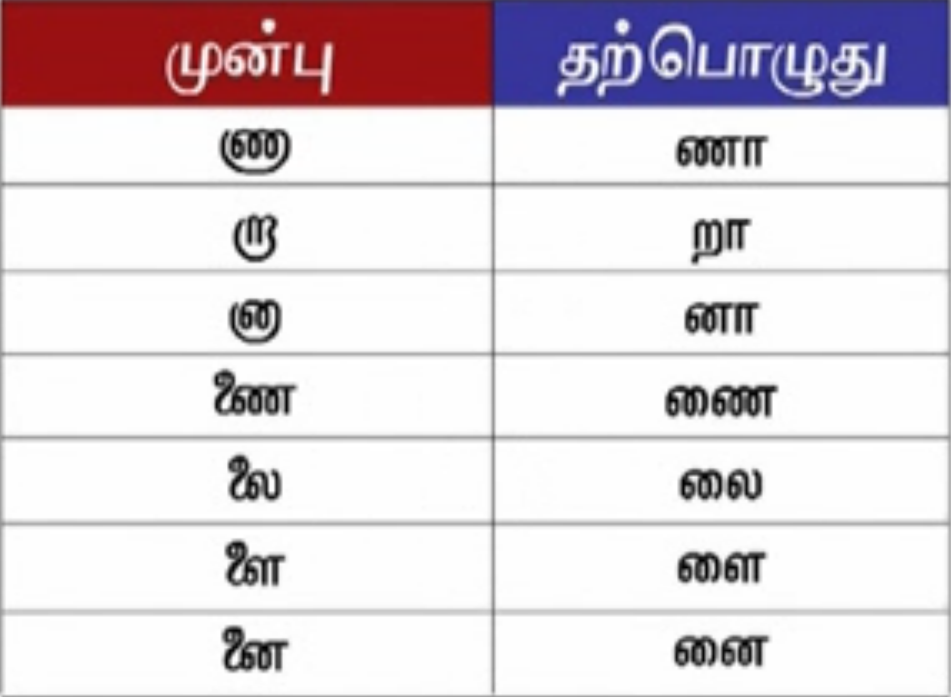
Left column shows pre-modern forms and right column contain the corresponding reformed representation

Simplified Tamil script or Reformed Tamil script refers to several governmental reforms to the Tamil script.

In 1978, the Government of Tamil Nadu reformed certain syllables of the modern Tamil script with view to simplify the script. It aimed to standardize non-standard ligatures of ஆ ā, ஒ o, ஓ ō and ஐ ai syllables.

Furthermore, only 13 out of 15 of the proposed simplifications were successful as people continued to use ஐ ai instead of the proposed அய் ay and ஔ au instead of the proposed அவ் av.

== History ==
Kuthoosi Gurusamy initially proposed script reform and it seems credit was not given to him. A Script Reform Committee was formed in 1947 under Periyar E. V. Ramasamy, while in 1951 the Government of Tamil Nadu accepted its recommendations, it failed to enforce them. He encouraged it on the basis that it allegedly eased typesetting as Periyar was himself a typesetter of his newspapers in early days.

This was preceded by many reforms during early 20th century, led by Tamil purist movement, which purged most of the Grantha consonants from the Tamil-Grantha script (except ஜ ja, ஷ sha, ஸ sa, ஹ ha) and standardized the modern Tamil alphabet.

Even if the majority of the population had embraced the spelling reform, the pre-reform letterforms are still occasionally seen.
