= Manipravalam =

Historic Hybrid Language in South India

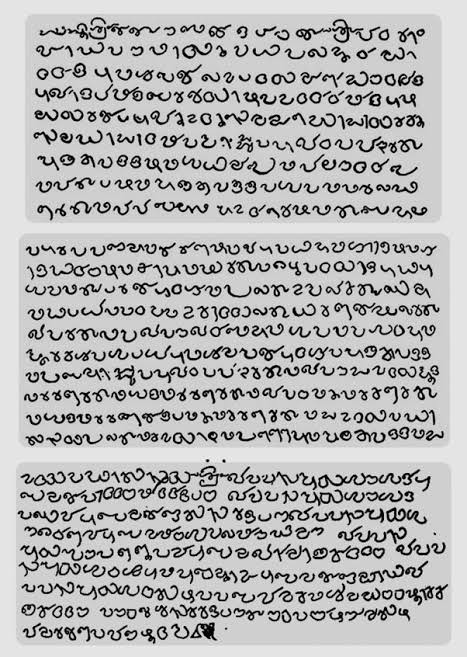
Manipravalam used to write Malayalam

Manipravalam (Tamil: மணிப்பிரவாளம், romanized: Maṇippiravāḷam, Malayalam: മണിപ്രവാളം, romanized: Maṇipravāḷam) is a macaronic language found in some manuscripts of South India. It is a hybrid language, typically written in the Grantha script, which combines Sanskrit lexicon and Tamil morpho-syntax. According to language scholars Giovanni Ciotti and Marco Franceschini, the blending of Tamil and Sanskrit is evidenced in manuscripts and their colophons over a long period of time, and this ultimately may have contributed to the emergence of Manipravalam. However, the 14th century Sanskrit work Lilatilakam states that Manipravalam is a combination of Tamil and Sanskrit. Generally, it is agreed that it was a combination of Middle Tamil and Sanskrit.

The twelfth century has been described as a watershed moment in the history of Malayalam, where it was finally accepted as a vehicle for literary expression. The two dominant schools in Malayalam writing were the pattu and the manipravalam, the former being influenced by Tamil poetic traditions and the latter designated for Sanskrit influences. Despite their extraneous regulation, the two schools would come to dominate the edifice of Malayalam poetry that they continue to shape its style to this day.

Mani-pravalam literally means 'gem-coral', with mani referring to gems (mainly rubies) in Tamil, and pravalam referring to coral in Sanskrit. It likely played a role in the growth of the Malayalam literature and Modern Malayalam script. The Kerala scholars distinguished Manipravalam from the aforementioned pattu, the former being significantly influenced by Sanskrit and the latter predominantly Tamil. Manipravalam has been used for poetry manuscripts that combine Tamil and Sanskrit, as well as South Indian works on eroticism. The 14th-century Lilatilakam text states Manipravalam to be a Bhashya (language) where "Dravida and Sanskrit should combine together like ruby and coral, without the least trace of any discord".

== Influence on the Malayalam script ==
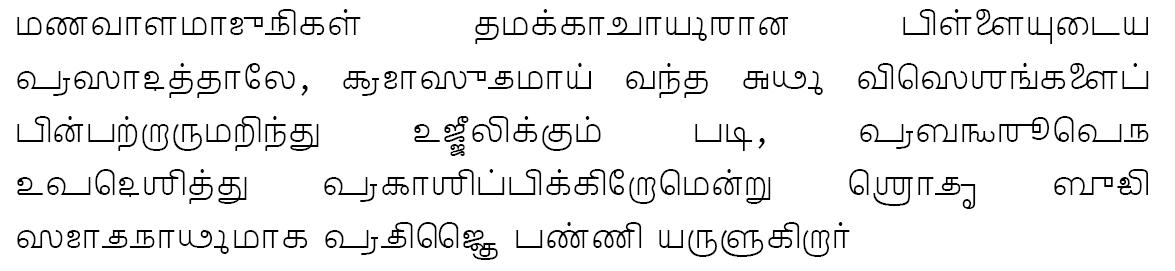
Example of Manipravalam text converted to Tamil-Grantha script

It is suggested that the advent of the Manipravalam style, where letters of the Grantha script coexisted with the traditional Vatteluttu letters, made it easier for people in Kerala to accept a Grantha-based script Ārya eḻuttŭ, and paved the way for the introduction of the new writing system. Eventually Vaṭṭeḻuttŭ was almost completely supplanted by the modern Malayalam script.

== See also ==
- Buddhist Hybrid Sanskrit
