= Extended Tamil script =

Brahmic script

Extended-Tamil script or Tamil–Grantha script (portmanteau: GranTamizh) refers to a script used to write the Tamil language before the 20th century Tamil purist movement. Tamil-Grantha is a mixed-script: a combination of the conservative-Tamil script that independently evolved from pre-Pallava script, combined with consonants imported from a later-stage evolved Grantha script (from Pallava-Grantha) to write non-Tamil consonants. Some scholars posit that the origin of Tamil-Grantha is unclear: the script could also be a direct descendant of the Pallava-Grantha script which extensively developed during the Middle Tamil period to write Middle-Tamil.

The Modern Tamil script is a subset of Tamil-Grantha alphabet, retaining only the 18 consonants taken from Tolkāppiyam-based Old Tamil which generally was written using Tamil-Brahmi, Pallava script and Vatteluttu script. Tamil-Grantha has 36 consonants, hence covering all Indic consonants like Malayalam script. However, the Modern-Tamil standard allowed a few additional consonants from Grantha into its alphabet: ஜ (ja), ஷ (ṣa), ஸ (sa), ஹ (ha). But their usage is discouraged by Tamil purists and recommend to assimilate the sounds to approximate pure-Tamil phonology, respectively: ச (ca), ச (ca), ச (ca), க (ka). Another letter ஶ was also allowed in 2005 exclusively to write ஶ்ரீ (śrī); however purists enforce the usage of திரு (tiru) over ஶ்ரீ.

In terms of utility, the major difference between Modern-Tamil and Tamil-Grantha is that the former is a phonemic script (where voiced consonants are treated as allophones of the voiceless consonants, and no aspirated consonants), and the latter is a fully-phonetic script. Hence, if one were to write only pure-Tamil-derived words in their text, it is enough (and minimally efficient) to use the Modern-Tamil script. However, if one were to include non-South-Dravidian words in their text, using the pure-Tamil script can cause errors in pronunciations since the phonemic-transcription rules of Tamil Grammar does not apply to such vocabularies. So depending on the domain of text (and number of loan words), writers used either the minimal-Tamil script or extended-Tamil script. To write or transliterate Sanskrit texts, the full Grantha script was used instead of Tamil-Grantha.

== History ==
The Independent Tamil Movement of the colonial era purged Grantha characters from use (calling "Grantha" an Aryan "pollution" of Tamil) and with support from Dravidian parties, mandated to exclusively use the reformed minimal-Tamil script. They also successfully "cleaned" Tamil textbooks by replacing Indo-Aryan vocabulary with pure-Tamil words, especially Sanskritic/Prakritic words that entered via Middle-Tamil; hence making Grantha characters almost useless in modern formal-Tamil. According to Kailasapathy, this was a part of Dravidian nationalism and amounted to regional ethnic chauvinism.

Although the predominant amount of classical Tamil literature is written in Middle Tamil, Tamil purists regard only Old Tamil as the authentic source for Tamil grammar and literature. Based on vocabulary, Tamil is classified into two registers: செந்தமிழ் (centamiḻ) meaning 'good' (or 'pure') Tamil and கொடுந்தமிழ் (koṭuntamiḻ) meaning 'horrible' (or 'corrupt') Tamil. Purists classify Middle Tamil as belonging to the latter class, thereby enabling the Dravidian movement to call Tamil-Grantha as impure.

Hence in the present day, only a few religious texts have the inclination to choose Tamil-Grantha; all other domains have adapted to Modern-Tamil.

== Digital usage ==
Since Modern-Tamil unicode does not support all the missing consonants from Extended-Tamil, generally it is not possible to digitally encode it easily. It is possible to use fonts like Lopamudra and Agastya on top of Malayalam text to render it like Extended-Tamil. Or one can also use modified fonts that support rendering Grantha Unicode.

There were proposals to reunify Grantha into Modern-Tamil Unicode; however, the proposal triggered discontent by some. Considering the sensitivity involved and rejection of the proposal by the Tamil Nadu government, it was determined by the Indian government that the two scripts should not be unified, except numerals and a separate Unicode block was allocated to Grantha.

=== Computing resources ===
- AksharaMukha - To convert Indic/Roman text to Extended-Tamil
- Agastya & Lopamudra - Download Tamil-Grantha Fonts

== Non-Indic consonants ==
Tamil script can also be extended with ஃ (ஆய்த எழுத்து, āyda eḻuttu, equivalent to nuqta) to represent phonemes of foreign languages, especially used to write Islamic and Christian texts.

Adapted-Tamil	Latin	Perso-Arabic	Devanagari
ஃஜ	za	ز	ज़
ஃக	qa	ق	क़
ஃப	fa	ف	फ़
ஃவ	wa	و (Note: Pronounced as /v/ or /w/ based on context of letter)	व़
ஃஷ	zha (Note: Not to be confused with Tamil ழ ( [ɻ] / ḻ ))	ژ	झ़
ஃஸ	Sa or 9	ص	स़
ஃக்ஹ	kha	خ	ख़
ஃஹ	Ha or 7	ح	ह़
ஃத	Ta or 6	ط	त़

== See also ==
- Simplified Tamil script
- Tamil 99
- தமிழ் 99
- InScript
- Brahmic keyboard layouts
- Keyboard layout
- Tamil (Unicode block)
- Tamil blogosphere
- Tamil All Character Encoding
