= Mandagapattu Temple =

Hindu temple in Tamil Nadu, India

Coordinates: 12°6′27.8″N 79°27′23.9″E

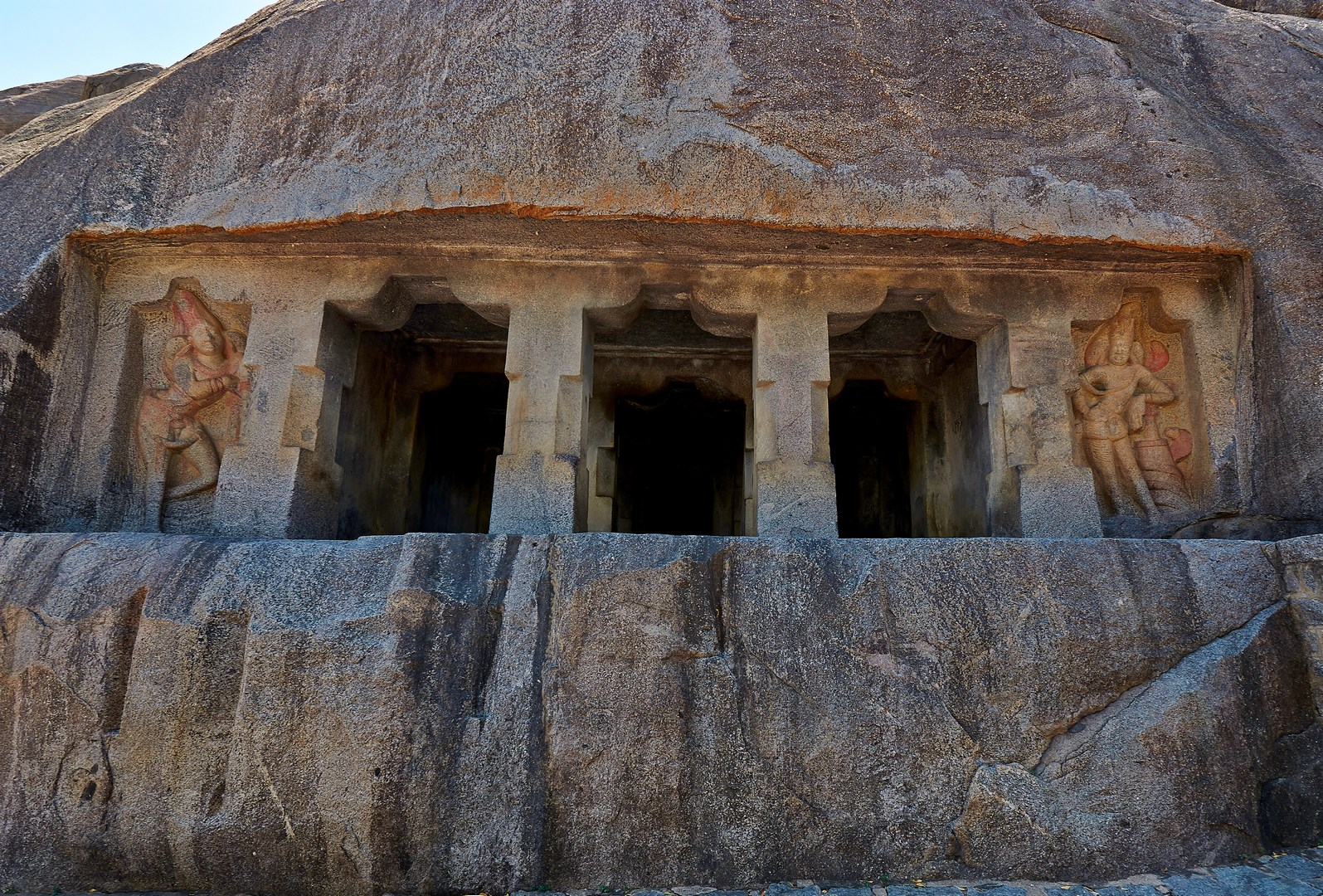
Early 7th-century Mandagapattu temple is dedicated to Brahma-Shiva-Vishnu.

Mandagapattu Tirumurti Temple is a Hindu temple situated in the village of Mandagapattu in the Viluppuram district of Tamil Nadu, India. Hewn from rock by the Pallava ruler Mahendravarman I in honour of the trinity Brahma-Shiva-Vishnu, the rock-cut cave temple is the oldest stone shrine discovered and dated in Tamil Nadu. The temple is notable for the earliest known rock-cut Sanskrit inscription written in Grantha script. It is attributed to the Pallava king Mahendravarman I (600–630 CE).

The inscription reads:

atadniṣṭakaṃdruṃ[malo]- hamasudhaṃ [vicitraci]ttena nimmarpitannrape[ṇa] brahmo – śvaraviṣṇula[kṣi]tāyanaṃ

Transliteration into Devanagari:

अतद्निष्टकंद्रुं[मलो]-
हमसुधं [विचित्रचि]त्तेन
निम्मर्पितन्न्रपे[ण] ब्रह्मो –
श्वरविष्णुल[क्षि]तायनं

Translation:

"The temple dedicated to Brahma, Siva and Vishnu was excavated by Vichitrachitta without using brick, timber, metal and mortar".

== History ==
First of its series of caves excavated during the Mahendravarman I. In his inscriptions he styles himself as vichitra chitta (''curious minded"), calls this temple as Lakshitayatna ("The temple of Lakshita") dedicated to the Trimurthi or Trinity. These inscriptions are found in Pallavaram and Tiruchirappalli cave-temples.

The temple is dedicated to the Trininty (Brahma, Isvara/Shiva, Vishnu), which is significant to note because most of other caves either are dedicated to Vishnu or Shiva. The temple is also called ayatana and it is truly made out of rock cut without using Bricks, Wood, Metal or Mortar of any kind.

=== Facade and Pillars ===
The cave was carved on the northern face of the large rock overlooking the irrigation tank to the west of the Mandagapattu village. The facade is cut well deep from the face of the rock, measuring 4feet in bottom and 2feet in the top. There are 2 pillars and 2 pilasters on their northern and inner faces having aspect of almost full pillars, so eventually it does look like 4 pillars in total. Beyond these pilasters on either side of the facades there are two recesses for the dwara-palas (which matter of fact are not symmetrical), and each of these two recesses has another pilaster demarcated into sadurams and kattus of uniform tetragonal section. Now these pillars are massive square types with octagonal kattu which divides them into cubes or sadurams above and below. The lower saduram is slightly higher due to its height from the base (oma).

=== Mandapa ===
Right behind the facade, is the mandapa separated from the inner mandapa ardha-mandapa behind by a row of pillars and pilasters. The floor of the front or mukha-mandapa is slightly lower level than that of the ardha-mandapa. The rock cut are carefully crafted such that the pillars of the inner mandapa and the ones in the facades are of equal shape and dimension, except the height of the lower saduram of the facade, due to slightly raised floor on which these pillars stand upon.

Over each of the two rows of the pillars and pilasters there is a principle beam cut also called as uttira, that over the inner rows slightly thicker than that of the outer row. At either end, cut over the side walls, are two cross beam which, curiously do not go over these principal longitudinal beams or even under them but are one the same level with them. Over the beams is cut a vajana, projecting beyond the width of the beam. The ceiling is plain and free of any design or art works.

== Gallery ==
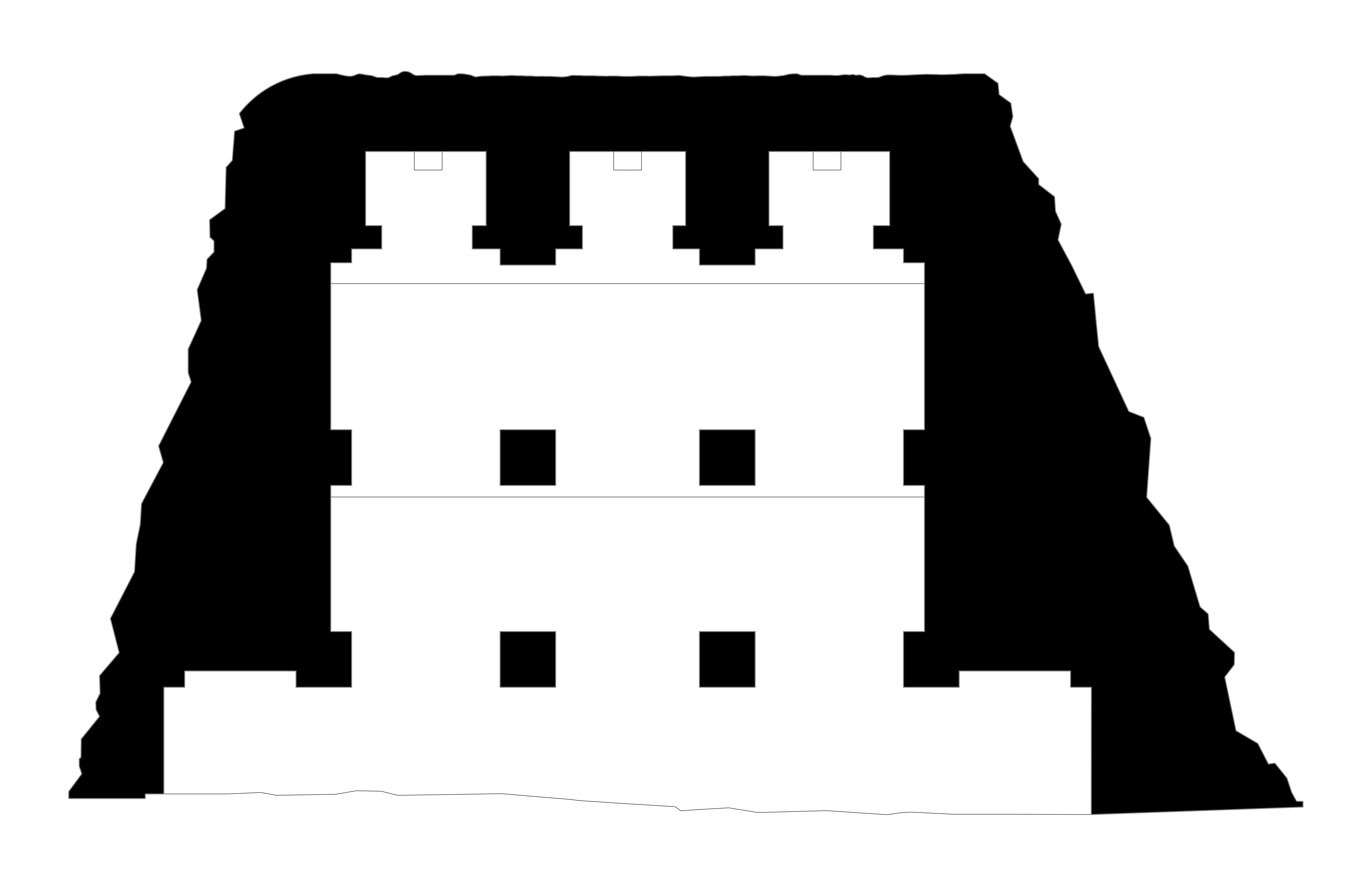
Floor plan of the Mandagapattu temple

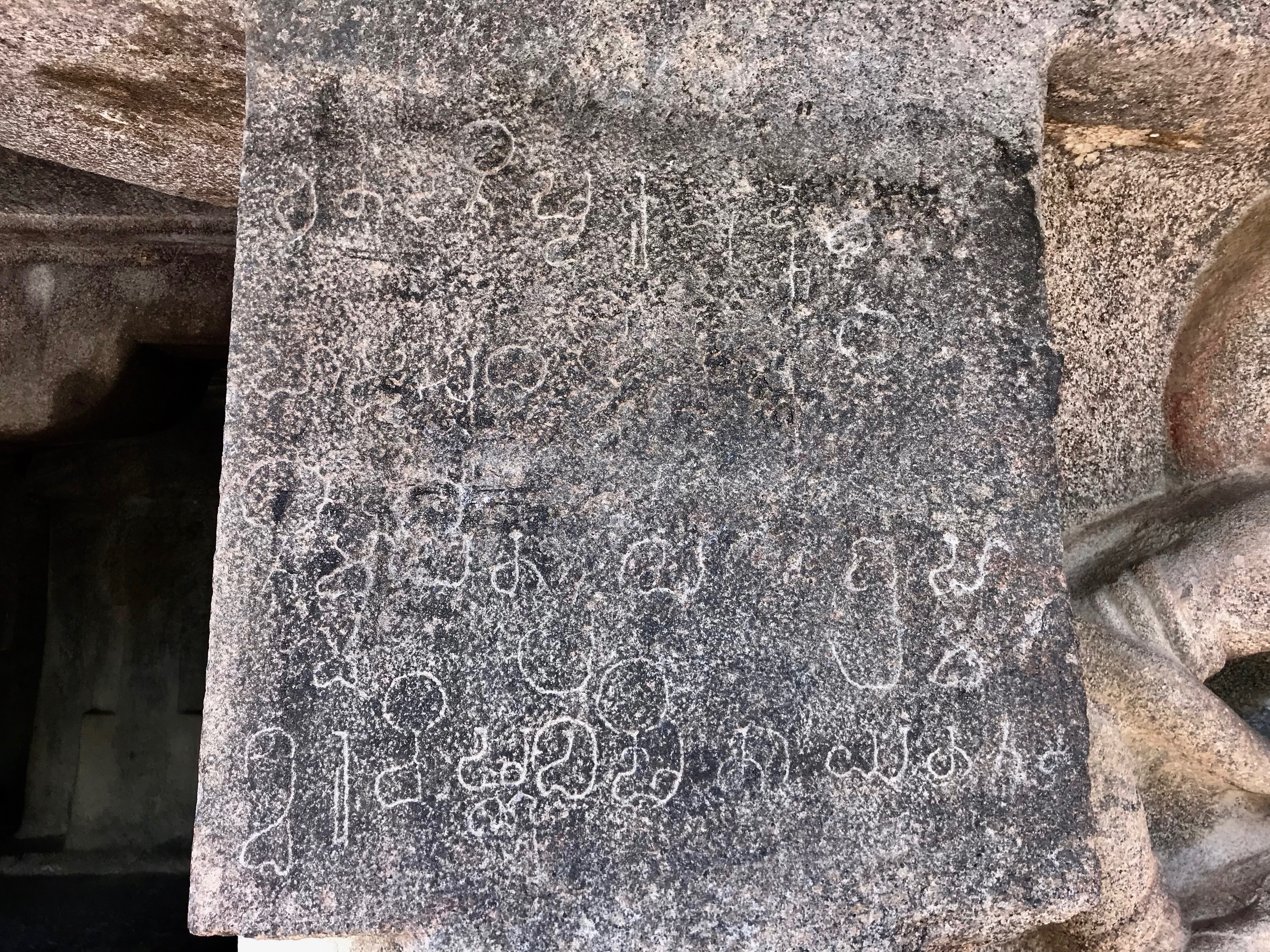
Sanskrit inscription

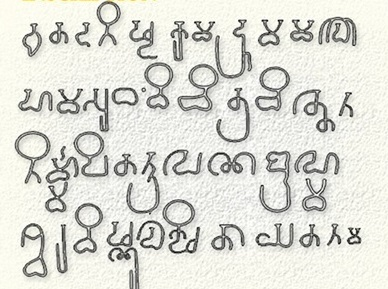
Inscription, 2-D print

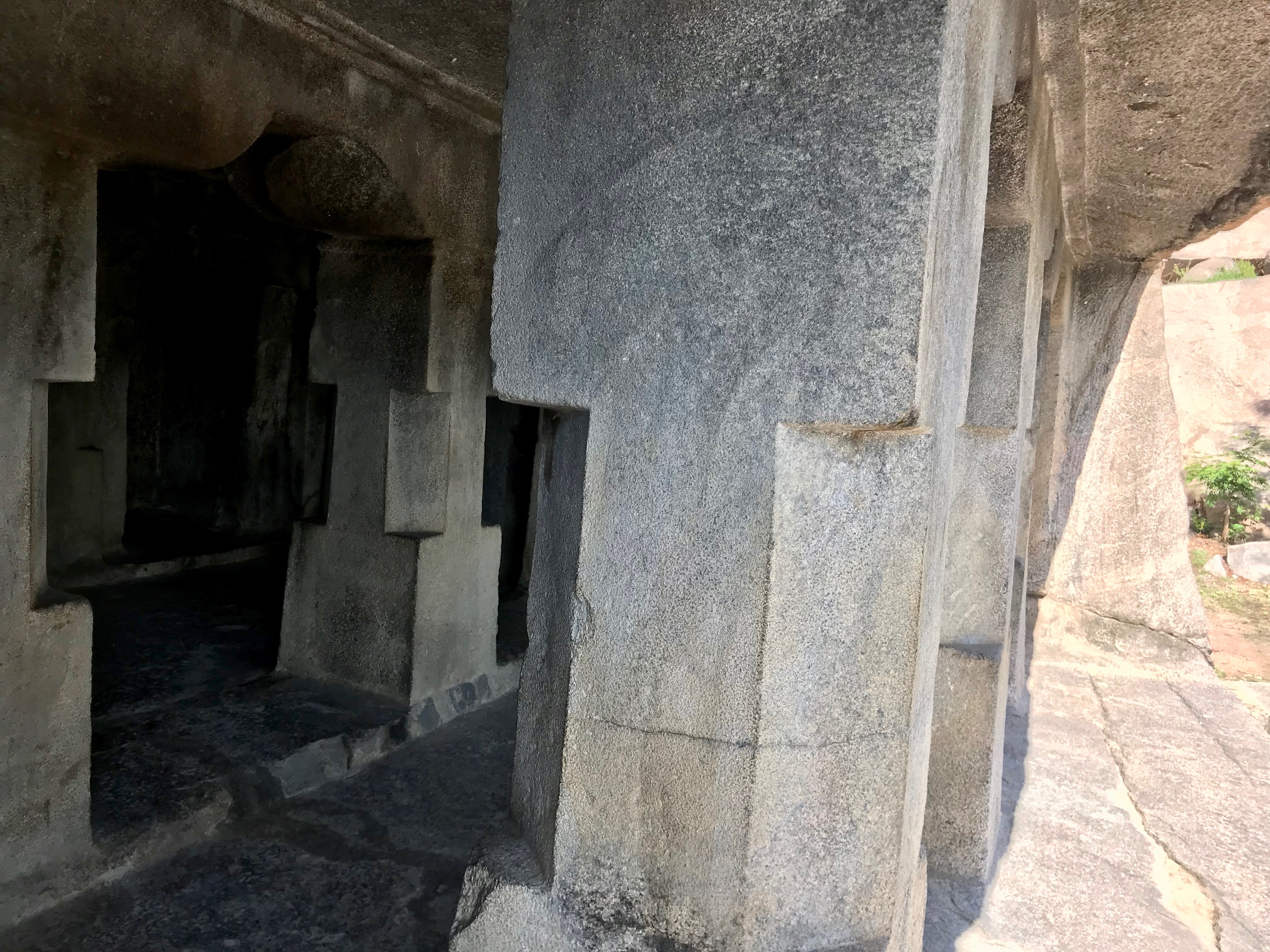
The mukya and ardha mandapas

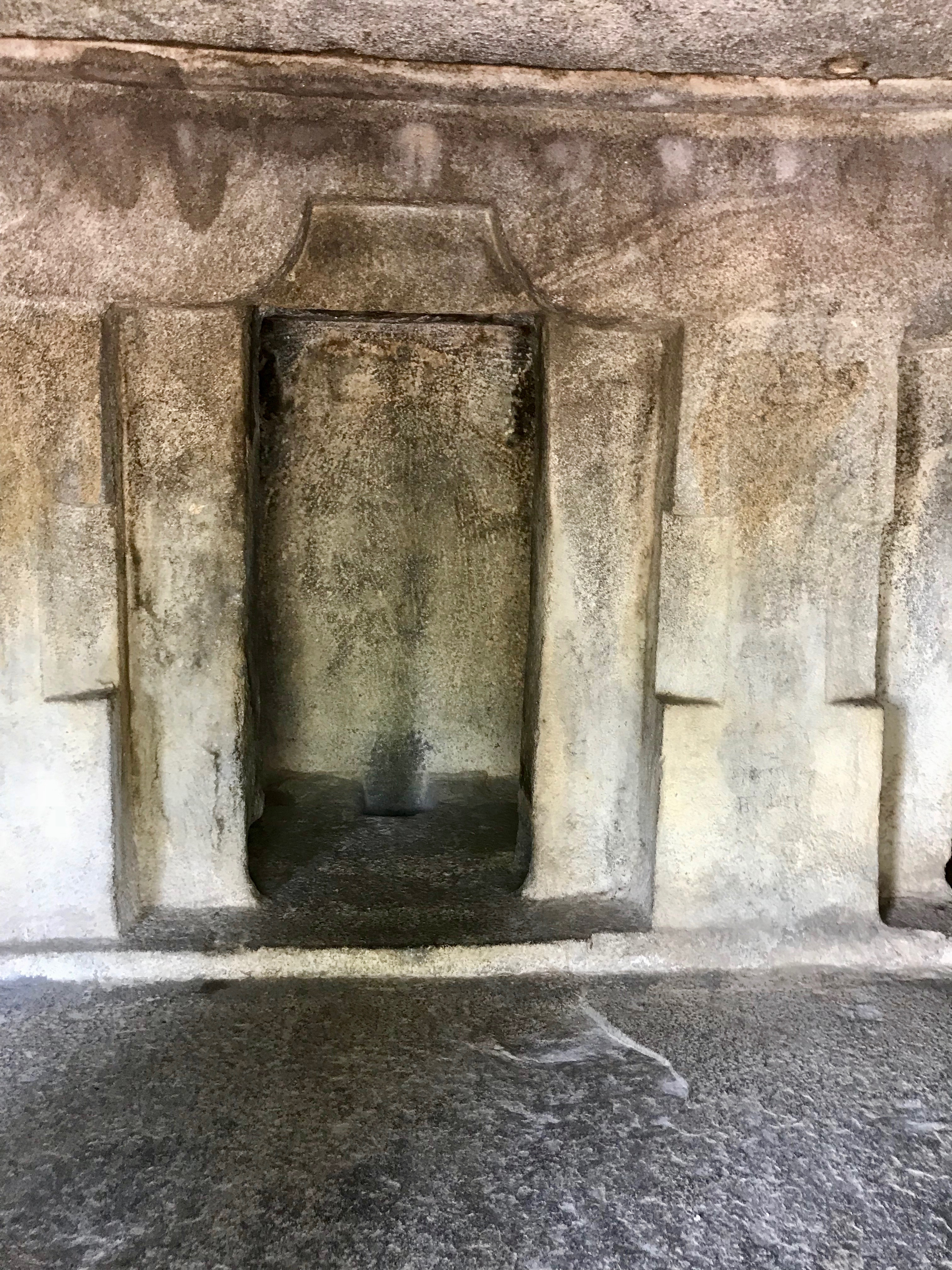
One of three sanctums

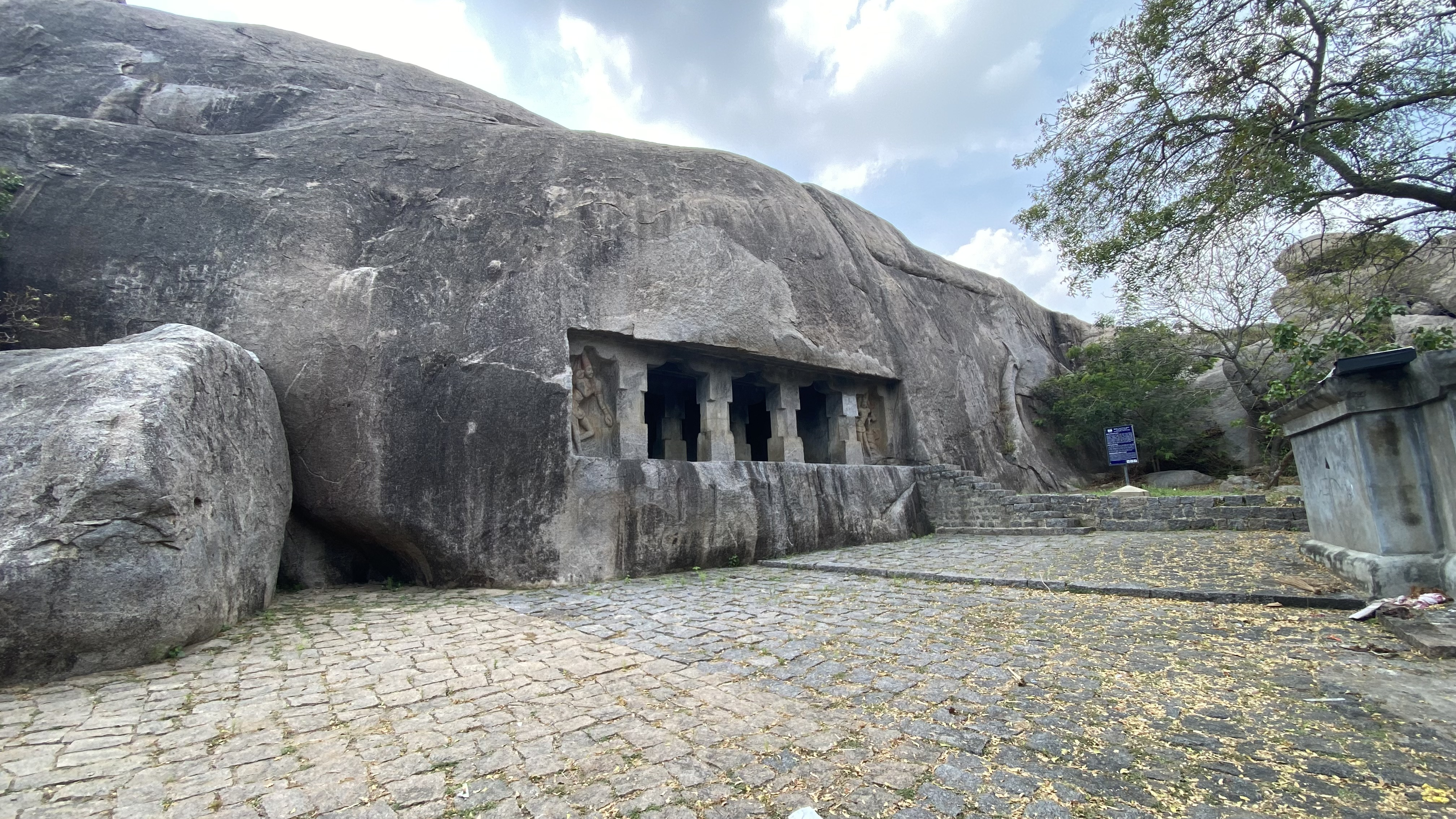
Landscape view

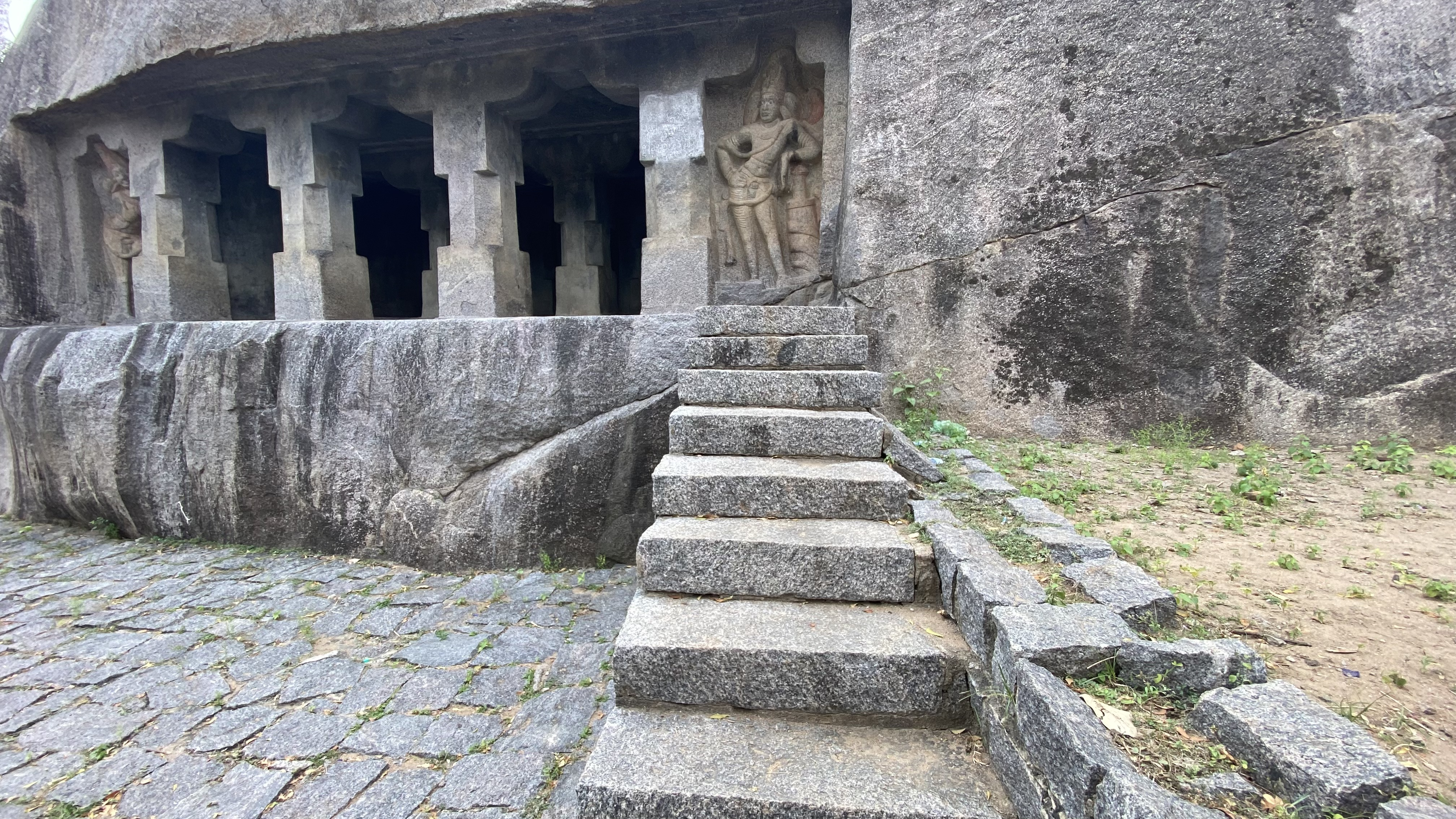
Temple stairs

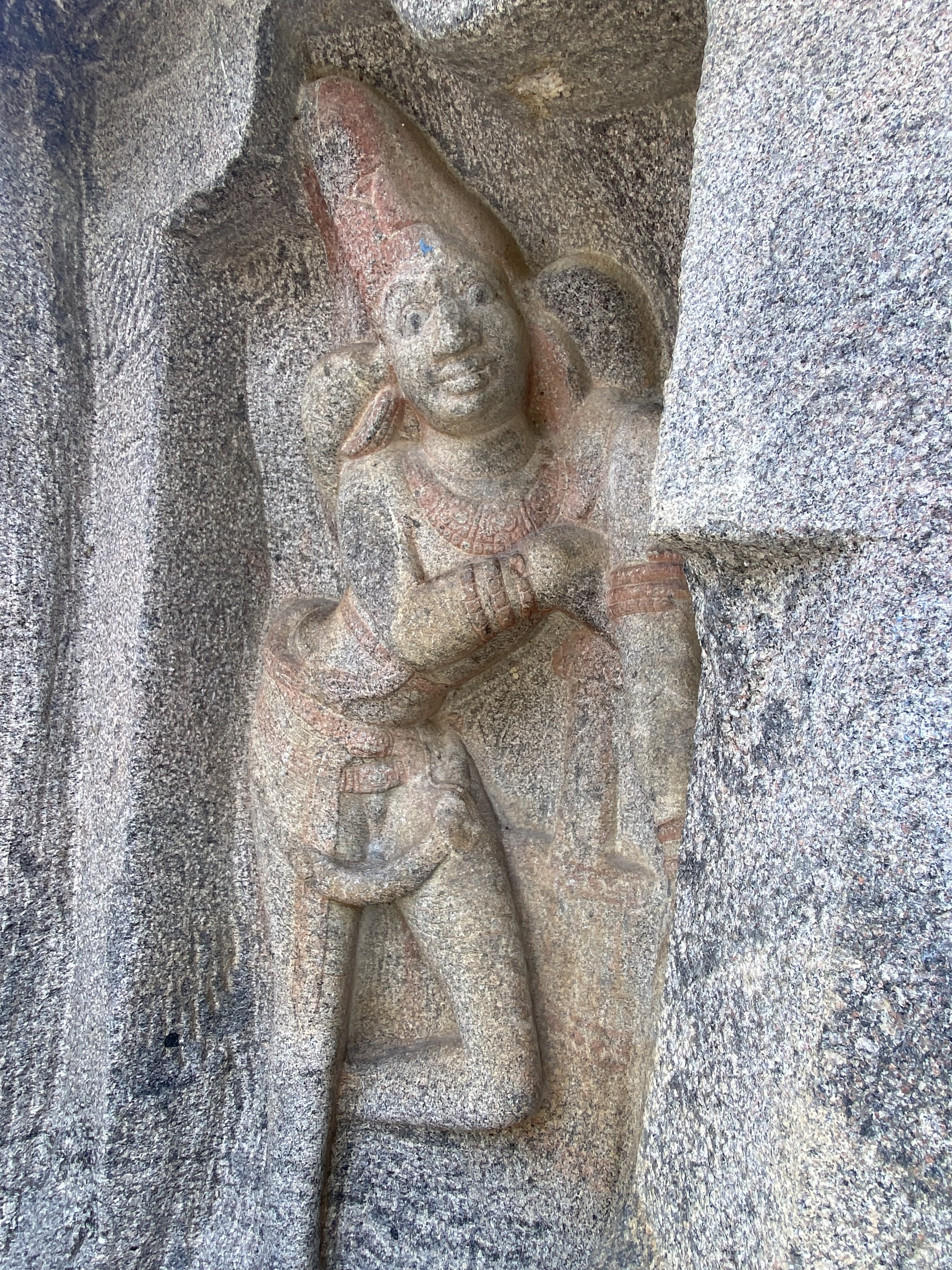
Right side dwara pala

== Sources ==
- K.A. Nilakanta Sastri, K.A (2000) [1935]. The CōĻas. Madras: University of Madras.
