= Grantha (Unicode block) =

- Range: U+11300..U+1137F (128 code points)
- Plane: SMP
- Scripts: Grantha (85 char.); Inherited (1 char.)
- Major alphabets: Sanskrit Manipravalam
- Assigned: 86 code points
- Unused: 42 reserved code points

Unicode version history
- 7.0 (2014): 83 (+83)
- 8.0 (2015): 85 (+2)
- 11.0 (2018): 86 (+1)

Unicode documentation
- Code chart ∣ Web page

Grantha is a Unicode block containing the ancient Grantha script characters of 6th to 19th century Tamil Nadu and Kerala for writing Sanskrit and Manipravalam.

Grantha^{[1]}^{[2]} Official Unicode Consortium code chart (PDF)
| | 0 | 1 | 2 | 3 | 4 | 5 | 6 | 7 | 8 | 9 | A | B | C | D | E | F |
| U+1130x | 𑌀 | 𑌁 | 𑌂 | 𑌃 | | 𑌅 | 𑌆 | 𑌇 | 𑌈 | 𑌉 | 𑌊 | 𑌋 | 𑌌 | | | 𑌏 |
| U+1131x | 𑌐 | | | 𑌓 | 𑌔 | 𑌕 | 𑌖 | 𑌗 | 𑌘 | 𑌙 | 𑌚 | 𑌛 | 𑌜 | 𑌝 | 𑌞 | 𑌟 |
| U+1132x | 𑌠 | 𑌡 | 𑌢 | 𑌣 | 𑌤 | 𑌥 | 𑌦 | 𑌧 | 𑌨 | | 𑌪 | 𑌫 | 𑌬 | 𑌭 | 𑌮 | 𑌯 |
| U+1133x | 𑌰 | | 𑌲 | 𑌳 | | 𑌵 | 𑌶 | 𑌷 | 𑌸 | 𑌹 | | 𑌻 | 𑌼 | 𑌽 | 𑌾 | 𑌿 |
| U+1134x | 𑍀 | 𑍁 | 𑍂 | 𑍃 | 𑍄 | | | 𑍇 | 𑍈 | | | 𑍋 | 𑍌 | 𑍍 | | |
| U+1135x | 𑍐 | | | | | | | 𑍗 | | | | | | 𑍝 | 𑍞 | 𑍟 |
| U+1136x | 𑍠 | 𑍡 | 𑍢 | 𑍣 | | | 𑍦 | 𑍧 | 𑍨 | 𑍩 | 𑍪 | 𑍫 | 𑍬 | | | |
| U+1137x | 𑍰 | 𑍱 | 𑍲 | 𑍳 | 𑍴 | | | | | | | | | | | |
Notes: 1. As of Unicode version 17.0; 2. Grey areas indicate non-assigned code points

== History ==
The following Unicode-related documents record the purpose and process of defining specific characters in the Grantha block:

| Version | Final code points (Note: Proposed code points and characters names may differ from final code points and names) | Count | L2 ID | WG2 ID | Document |
|---|---|---|---|---|---|
| 7.0 | U+11301..11303, 11305..1130C, 1130F..11310, 11313..11328, 1132A..11330, 11332..11333, 11335..11339, 1133D..11344, 11347..11348, 1134B..1134C, 11360..11363 | 65 | L2/09-141R | | Ganesan, Naga (2009-04-22), Proposal to Encode the Grantha Script in the Basic Multilingual Plane (BMP) of ISO/IEC 10646 |
| 7.0 | U+11301..11303, 11305..1130C, 1130F..11310, 11313..11328, 1132A..11330, 11332..11333, 11335..11339, 1133D..11344, 11347..11348, 1134B..1134C, 11360..11363 | 65 | L2/09-345 | | Ganesan, Naga (2009-04-22), Proposal to encode the Grantha Script in the Basic Multilingual Plane (BMP) of ISO/IEC 10646 |
| 7.0 | U+11301..11303, 11305..1130C, 1130F..11310, 11313..11328, 1132A..11330, 11332..11333, 11335..11339, 1133D..11344, 11347..11348, 1134B..1134C, 11360..11363 | 65 | L2/09-206 | | Dias, Gihan (2009-05-09), Re: Grantha Proposal |
| 7.0 | U+11301..11303, 11305..1130C, 1130F..11310, 11313..11328, 1132A..11330, 11332..11333, 11335..11339, 1133D..11344, 11347..11348, 1134B..1134C, 11360..11363 | 65 | L2/09-210 | | Lata, Swaran (2009-05-11), Encoding of Grantha Script in the Unicode Standard |
| 7.0 | U+11301..11303, 11305..1130C, 1130F..11310, 11313..11328, 1132A..11330, 11332..11333, 11335..11339, 1133D..11344, 11347..11348, 1134B..1134C, 11360..11363 | 65 | L2/09-258 | | Sharma, Shriramana (2009-08-02), Re: Grantha Proposal |
| 7.0 | U+11301..11303, 11305..1130C, 1130F..11310, 11313..11328, 1132A..11330, 11332..11333, 11335..11339, 1133D..11344, 11347..11348, 1134B..1134C, 11360..11363 | 65 | L2/09-277 | | Karlsson, Kent (2009-08-06), Comments on L2/09-141, Proposal to Encode the Grantha Script… |
| 7.0 | U+11301..11303, 11305..1130C, 1130F..11310, 11313..11328, 1132A..11330, 11332..11333, 11335..11339, 1133D..11344, 11347..11348, 1134B..1134C, 11360..11363 | 65 | L2/09-316 | | Sharma, Shriramana (2009-08-15), Comments on Mr Ganesan's Grantha Proposal |
| 7.0 | U+11301..11303, 11305..1130C, 1130F..11310, 11313..11328, 1132A..11330, 11332..11333, 11335..11339, 1133D..11344, 11347..11348, 1134B..1134C, 11360..11363 | 65 | L2/09-324 | | Sharma, Shriramana (2009-09-26), Comments on Kent Karlsson's document L2/09-277 |
| 7.0 | U+11301..11303, 11305..1130C, 1130F..11310, 11313..11328, 1132A..11330, 11332..11333, 11335..11339, 1133D..11344, 11347..11348, 1134B..1134C, 11360..11363 | 65 | L2/09-380 | | Lata, Swaran (2009-10-09), Letter from Swaran Lata concerning Grantha Proposal |
| 7.0 | U+11301..11303, 11305..1130C, 1130F..11310, 11313..11328, 1132A..11330, 11332..11333, 11335..11339, 1133D..11344, 11347..11348, 1134B..1134C, 11360..11363 | 65 | L2/09-373 | | Sharma, Shriramana (2009-10-11), Why jihvamuliya and upadhmaniya characters are not proposed for Grantha |
| 7.0 | U+11301..11303, 11305..1130C, 1130F..11310, 11313..11328, 1132A..11330, 11332..11333, 11335..11339, 1133D..11344, 11347..11348, 1134B..1134C, 11360..11363 | 65 | L2/09-372 | | Sharma, Shriramana (2009-10-24), Proposal to encode the Grantha script in Unicode |
| 7.0 | U+11301..11303, 11305..1130C, 1130F..11310, 11313..11328, 1132A..11330, 11332..11333, 11335..11339, 1133D..11344, 11347..11348, 1134B..1134C, 11360..11363 | 65 | L2/09-405 | | Ganesan, Naga (2009-10-31), Comment on L2/09-372 (Number of Viramas in closely related Malayalam and Grantha scripts) |
| 7.0 | U+11301..11303, 11305..1130C, 1130F..11310, 11313..11328, 1132A..11330, 11332..11333, 11335..11339, 1133D..11344, 11347..11348, 1134B..1134C, 11360..11363 | 65 | L2/10-048 | | Kulkarni, M. D. (2010-01-27), Proposal to encode the Grantha script in the BMP of the UCS |
| 7.0 | U+11301..11303, 11305..1130C, 1130F..11310, 11313..11328, 1132A..11330, 11332..11333, 11335..11339, 1133D..11344, 11347..11348, 1134B..1134C, 11360..11363 | 65 | L2/10-053 | | Anderson, Deborah; McGowan, Rick; Whistler, Ken (2010-01-28), Summary and Assessment of Grantha Proposals |
| 7.0 | U+11301..11303, 11305..1130C, 1130F..11310, 11313..11328, 1132A..11330, 11332..11333, 11335..11339, 1133D..11344, 11347..11348, 1134B..1134C, 11360..11363 | 65 | L2/10-071 | | McGowan, Rick; Anderson, Deborah (2010-02-17), Revised Chart and Names List for Grantha based on L2/10-053 |
| 7.0 | U+11301..11303, 11305..1130C, 1130F..11310, 11313..11328, 1132A..11330, 11332..11333, 11335..11339, 1133D..11344, 11347..11348, 1134B..1134C, 11360..11363 | 65 | L2/10-085 | | Sharma, Shriramana (2010-03-12), Feedback to Dr Anderson's Grantha Summary dt 2010-Jan-28 |
| 7.0 | U+11301..11303, 11305..1130C, 1130F..11310, 11313..11328, 1132A..11330, 11332..11333, 11335..11339, 1133D..11344, 11347..11348, 1134B..1134C, 11360..11363 | 65 | L2/10-167 | | Anderson, Deborah; McGowan, Rick; Whistler, Ken (2010-05-05), "8", Review of Indic-related L2 documents and Recommendations to the UTC |
| 7.0 | U+11301..11303, 11305..1130C, 1130F..11310, 11313..11328, 1132A..11330, 11332..11333, 11335..11339, 1133D..11344, 11347..11348, 1134B..1134C, 11360..11363 | 65 | L2/10-259 | | Sharma, Shriramana (2010-07-27), Follow-up #2 to my Grantha proposal L2/09-372 |
| 7.0 | U+11301..11303, 11305..1130C, 1130F..11310, 11313..11328, 1132A..11330, 11332..11333, 11335..11339, 1133D..11344, 11347..11348, 1134B..1134C, 11360..11363 | 65 | L2/10-283 | | Sharma, Shriramana (2010-08-03), Request from scholars of the Grantha user community #2 |
| 7.0 | U+11301..11303, 11305..1130C, 1130F..11310, 11313..11328, 1132A..11330, 11332..11333, 11335..11339, 1133D..11344, 11347..11348, 1134B..1134C, 11360..11363 | 65 | L2/10-284 | | Sharma, Shriramana (2010-08-03), Comments on L2/10-194 |
| 7.0 | U+11301..11303, 11305..1130C, 1130F..11310, 11313..11328, 1132A..11330, 11332..11333, 11335..11339, 1133D..11344, 11347..11348, 1134B..1134C, 11360..11363 | 65 | L2/10-299R | | Anderson, Deborah; McGowan, Rick; Whistler, Ken (2010-08-06), "Name Change for GRANTHA SIGN ANUNASIKA", Review of Indic-related L2 documents and Recommendations to the UTC |
| 7.0 | U+11301..11303, 11305..1130C, 1130F..11310, 11313..11328, 1132A..11330, 11332..11333, 11335..11339, 1133D..11344, 11347..11348, 1134B..1134C, 11360..11363 | 65 | L2/10-314 | | Lata, Swaran (2010-08-10), Letter regarding Grantha encoding |
| 7.0 | U+11301..11303, 11305..1130C, 1130F..11310, 11313..11328, 1132A..11330, 11332..11333, 11335..11339, 1133D..11344, 11347..11348, 1134B..1134C, 11360..11363 | 65 | L2/10-221 | | Moore, Lisa (2010-08-23), "D.8, D.1.12", UTC #124 / L2 #221 Minutes |
| 7.0 | U+11301..11303, 11305..1130C, 1130F..11310, 11313..11328, 1132A..11330, 11332..11333, 11335..11339, 1133D..11344, 11347..11348, 1134B..1134C, 11360..11363 | 65 | L2/10-265R | | McGowan, Rick; Anderson, Deborah (2010-08-26), Revised Chart and Names List for Grantha |
| 7.0 | U+11301..11303, 11305..1130C, 1130F..11310, 11313..11328, 1132A..11330, 11332..11333, 11335..11339, 1133D..11344, 11347..11348, 1134B..1134C, 11360..11363 | 65 | L2/10-341 | | Sharma, Shriramana (2010-09-14), Encoding sub-base Grantha vowel signs for Vocalic L and LL |
| 7.0 | U+11301..11303, 11305..1130C, 1130F..11310, 11313..11328, 1132A..11330, 11332..11333, 11335..11339, 1133D..11344, 11347..11348, 1134B..1134C, 11360..11363 | 65 | L2/10-409 | | Jain, Manoj (2010-10-18), Unicode Standard for Grantha Script, Summary of the Meeting Sept 6th, New Delhi |
| 7.0 | U+11301..11303, 11305..1130C, 1130F..11310, 11313..11328, 1132A..11330, 11332..11333, 11335..11339, 1133D..11344, 11347..11348, 1134B..1134C, 11360..11363 | 65 | L2/10-426 | | Jain, Manoj (2010-10-18), Proposal to encode the Grantha script in Unicode |
| 7.0 | U+11301..11303, 11305..1130C, 1130F..11310, 11313..11328, 1132A..11330, 11332..11333, 11335..11339, 1133D..11344, 11347..11348, 1134B..1134C, 11360..11363 | 65 | L2/10-440 | | Anderson, Deborah; McGowan, Rick; Whistler, Ken (2010-10-27), "I. GRANTHA", Review of Indic-related L2 documents and Recommendations to the UTC |
| 7.0 | U+11301..11303, 11305..1130C, 1130F..11310, 11313..11328, 1132A..11330, 11332..11333, 11335..11339, 1133D..11344, 11347..11348, 1134B..1134C, 11360..11363 | 65 | L2/10-457 | | Nakkeeran, P. R. (2010-11-01), Feedback on Grantha Unicode Committee meeting minutes - reg. |
| 7.0 | U+11301..11303, 11305..1130C, 1130F..11310, 11313..11328, 1132A..11330, 11332..11333, 11335..11339, 1133D..11344, 11347..11348, 1134B..1134C, 11360..11363 | 65 | L2/10-459 | | Kaviarasan, Va.Mu.Se. (2010-11-01), Response to L2/10-426 and L2/10-447 and any other proposals requesting to add characters to represent Tamil or Tamil Block |
| 7.0 | U+11301..11303, 11305..1130C, 1130F..11310, 11313..11328, 1132A..11330, 11332..11333, 11335..11339, 1133D..11344, 11347..11348, 1134B..1134C, 11360..11363 | 65 | L2/10-464 | | Karunanidhi, M. (2010-11-06), Letter from Gov't of Tamil Nadu re Grantha |
| 7.0 | U+11301..11303, 11305..1130C, 1130F..11310, 11313..11328, 1132A..11330, 11332..11333, 11335..11339, 1133D..11344, 11347..11348, 1134B..1134C, 11360..11363 | 65 | L2/10-472 | | Palaniappan, Sudalaimuthu (2010-11-06), Letter to Lisa Moore re Grantha Encoding |
| 7.0 | U+11301..11303, 11305..1130C, 1130F..11310, 11313..11328, 1132A..11330, 11332..11333, 11335..11339, 1133D..11344, 11347..11348, 1134B..1134C, 11360..11363 | 65 | L2/11-351 | | Constable, Peter (2010-11-29), E-mail regarding Grantha sub-base vocalic L/LL and Vedic Tone Asterisk Above |
| 7.0 | U+11301..11303, 11305..1130C, 1130F..11310, 11313..11328, 1132A..11330, 11332..11333, 11335..11339, 1133D..11344, 11347..11348, 1134B..1134C, 11360..11363 | 65 | L2/11-002 | | Kaviarasan, Va.Mu.Se. (2011-01-07), Response to Govt. of India Proposal L2/10-426 |
| 7.0 | U+11301..11303, 11305..1130C, 1130F..11310, 11313..11328, 1132A..11330, 11332..11333, 11335..11339, 1133D..11344, 11347..11348, 1134B..1134C, 11360..11363 | 65 | L2/11-006 | | Annamalai, E. (2011-01-14), My views on Encoding Grantha in Unicode |
| 7.0 | U+11301..11303, 11305..1130C, 1130F..11310, 11313..11328, 1132A..11330, 11332..11333, 11335..11339, 1133D..11344, 11347..11348, 1134B..1134C, 11360..11363 | 65 | L2/11-010 | | Kaviarasan, Va.Mu.Se. (2011-01-18), Press release from Gov't Tamil Nadu re Grantha |
| 7.0 | U+11301..11303, 11305..1130C, 1130F..11310, 11313..11328, 1132A..11330, 11332..11333, 11335..11339, 1133D..11344, 11347..11348, 1134B..1134C, 11360..11363 | 65 | L2/11-011 | | Ganesan, Naga (2011-01-21), Diacritic Marks for Short e & o Vowels (Dravidian and Vedic) in Devanagari (North India) and Grantha (South India) |
| 7.0 | U+11301..11303, 11305..1130C, 1130F..11310, 11313..11328, 1132A..11330, 11332..11333, 11335..11339, 1133D..11344, 11347..11348, 1134B..1134C, 11360..11363 | 65 | L2/11-024 | | Ganesan, Naga (2011-01-21), Letter from Prof. S. Raju regarding the addition of 5 Dravidian characters to Grantha block in Unicode |
| 7.0 | U+11301..11303, 11305..1130C, 1130F..11310, 11313..11328, 1132A..11330, 11332..11333, 11335..11339, 1133D..11344, 11347..11348, 1134B..1134C, 11360..11363 | 65 | L2/11-029 | | Logasundaram, N. D. (2011-01-25), Views, opinions and suggestions on Proposals submitted on on Grantham, an historic INDIC Script into SMP by learned individuals & Institutions |
| 7.0 | U+11301..11303, 11305..1130C, 1130F..11310, 11313..11328, 1132A..11330, 11332..11333, 11335..11339, 1133D..11344, 11347..11348, 1134B..1134C, 11360..11363 | 65 | L2/11-009 | | Shanker, R. (2011-01-27), Letter to Mark Davis from Gov't of India |
| 7.0 | U+11301..11303, 11305..1130C, 1130F..11310, 11313..11328, 1132A..11330, 11332..11333, 11335..11339, 1133D..11344, 11347..11348, 1134B..1134C, 11360..11363 | 65 | L2/11-027 | | Sundaravelu, J. (2011-01-30), Opposition to Unification of Grantham and Tamil Scripts in the Unicode |
| 7.0 | U+11301..11303, 11305..1130C, 1130F..11310, 11313..11328, 1132A..11330, 11332..11333, 11335..11339, 1133D..11344, 11347..11348, 1134B..1134C, 11360..11363 | 65 | L2/11-025 | | Ganesan, Naga (2011-01-31), Letter from Dr.R.Nagaswamy re Grantha |
| 7.0 | U+11301..11303, 11305..1130C, 1130F..11310, 11313..11328, 1132A..11330, 11332..11333, 11335..11339, 1133D..11344, 11347..11348, 1134B..1134C, 11360..11363 | 65 | L2/11-026 | | Manivannan, Mani (2011-01-31), INFITT Working Group comments on the Grantha encoding proposals |
| 7.0 | U+11301..11303, 11305..1130C, 1130F..11310, 11313..11328, 1132A..11330, 11332..11333, 11335..11339, 1133D..11344, 11347..11348, 1134B..1134C, 11360..11363 | 65 | L2/11-028 | | Dias, Gihan (2011-01-31), Position of the ICT Agency of Sri Lanka on the encoding of the Grantha Script |
| 7.0 | U+11301..11303, 11305..1130C, 1130F..11310, 11313..11328, 1132A..11330, 11332..11333, 11335..11339, 1133D..11344, 11347..11348, 1134B..1134C, 11360..11363 | 65 | L2/11-034 | | Ganesan, Naga (2011-02-01), Dravidian Letters in Tamil Grantha Script Some Notes in Their History of Use |
| 7.0 | U+11301..11303, 11305..1130C, 1130F..11310, 11313..11328, 1132A..11330, 11332..11333, 11335..11339, 1133D..11344, 11347..11348, 1134B..1134C, 11360..11363 | 65 | L2/11-048 | | Fernando, Albert (2011-02-01), Letter to Lisa Moore re Grantha Proposals L2/10-426 and L2/10-447 |
| 7.0 | U+11301..11303, 11305..1130C, 1130F..11310, 11313..11328, 1132A..11330, 11332..11333, 11335..11339, 1133D..11344, 11347..11348, 1134B..1134C, 11360..11363 | 65 | L2/11-042 | | Anderson, Deborah; McGowan, Rick; Whistler, Ken (2011-02-02), "I. GRANTHA", Review of Indic related L2 documents and Recommendations to the UTC |
| 7.0 | U+11301..11303, 11305..1130C, 1130F..11310, 11313..11328, 1132A..11330, 11332..11333, 11335..11339, 1133D..11344, 11347..11348, 1134B..1134C, 11360..11363 | 65 | L2/11-046 | | McGowan, Rick; Anderson, Deborah (2011-02-02), Grantha Compromise Chart |
| 7.0 | U+11301..11303, 11305..1130C, 1130F..11310, 11313..11328, 1132A..11330, 11332..11333, 11335..11339, 1133D..11344, 11347..11348, 1134B..1134C, 11360..11363 | 65 | L2/11-058 | | Arockiasamy, M. (2011-02-03), An Appeal to the Unicode Tech. Committee |
| 7.0 | U+11301..11303, 11305..1130C, 1130F..11310, 11313..11328, 1132A..11330, 11332..11333, 11335..11339, 1133D..11344, 11347..11348, 1134B..1134C, 11360..11363 | 65 | L2/11-055 | | Eraiyarasan, B. (2011-02-06), Comments on Tamil Unicode and Grantham Proposals |
| 7.0 | U+11301..11303, 11305..1130C, 1130F..11310, 11313..11328, 1132A..11330, 11332..11333, 11335..11339, 1133D..11344, 11347..11348, 1134B..1134C, 11360..11363 | 65 | L2/11-056 | | Uthayasoorian, K. (2011-02-06), Inclusion of Tamil Characters in Proposed Grantham Block |
| 7.0 | U+11301..11303, 11305..1130C, 1130F..11310, 11313..11328, 1132A..11330, 11332..11333, 11335..11339, 1133D..11344, 11347..11348, 1134B..1134C, 11360..11363 | 65 | L2/11-060 | | Ramakrishnan, T. (2011-02-07), Requesting the UTC to Reject Proposals to Mix Tamil and Grantha |
| 7.0 | U+11301..11303, 11305..1130C, 1130F..11310, 11313..11328, 1132A..11330, 11332..11333, 11335..11339, 1133D..11344, 11347..11348, 1134B..1134C, 11360..11363 | 65 | L2/11-063 | | Muthukumarasamy, Arivoli (2011-02-08), Comments of the Grantha Proposal L2/10-426 |
| 7.0 | U+11301..11303, 11305..1130C, 1130F..11310, 11313..11328, 1132A..11330, 11332..11333, 11335..11339, 1133D..11344, 11347..11348, 1134B..1134C, 11360..11363 | 65 | L2/11-073 | | Anderson, Deborah; Sharma, Shriramana (2011-02-10), Two Outstanding Indic-related Topics from November 2010 UTC |
| 7.0 | U+11301..11303, 11305..1130C, 1130F..11310, 11313..11328, 1132A..11330, 11332..11333, 11335..11339, 1133D..11344, 11347..11348, 1134B..1134C, 11360..11363 | 65 | L2/11-075 | | Logasundaram, N. D. (2011-02-14), More views, opinions and suggestions as feedback on proposal of encoding Grantham |
| 7.0 | U+11301..11303, 11305..1130C, 1130F..11310, 11313..11328, 1132A..11330, 11332..11333, 11335..11339, 1133D..11344, 11347..11348, 1134B..1134C, 11360..11363 | 65 | L2/11-186 | | Ganesan, Naga (2011-02-18), Dravidian letters in Grantha block in Unicode - regarding |
| 7.0 | U+11301..11303, 11305..1130C, 1130F..11310, 11313..11328, 1132A..11330, 11332..11333, 11335..11339, 1133D..11344, 11347..11348, 1134B..1134C, 11360..11363 | 65 | L2/11-139 | | Anderson, Deborah; McGowan, Rick; Whistler, Ken (2011-04-27), "1. Grantha", Review of Indic-related L2 documents and Recommendations to the UTC |
| 7.0 | U+11301..11303, 11305..1130C, 1130F..11310, 11313..11328, 1132A..11330, 11332..11333, 11335..11339, 1133D..11344, 11347..11348, 1134B..1134C, 11360..11363 | 65 | L2/11-182 | | Shanker, N. Ravi (2011-05-09), Letter to Mark Davis from N. Ravi Shanker, Gov't of India |
| 7.0 | U+11301..11303, 11305..1130C, 1130F..11310, 11313..11328, 1132A..11330, 11332..11333, 11335..11339, 1133D..11344, 11347..11348, 1134B..1134C, 11360..11363 | 65 | L2/11-251 | | Letter from Gov't of India to Mark Davis, May 10, 2011, re Grantha encoding, 2011-05-09 |
| 7.0 | U+11301..11303, 11305..1130C, 1130F..11310, 11313..11328, 1132A..11330, 11332..11333, 11335..11339, 1133D..11344, 11347..11348, 1134B..1134C, 11360..11363 | 65 | L2/11-200 | | McGowan, Rick; Anderson, Deborah (2011-05-16), Grantha Compromise Chart |
| 7.0 | U+11301..11303, 11305..1130C, 1130F..11310, 11313..11328, 1132A..11330, 11332..11333, 11335..11339, 1133D..11344, 11347..11348, 1134B..1134C, 11360..11363 | 65 | L2/11-284R | N4135 | Proposal to encode the Grantha script [summary form only], 2011-07-22 |
| 7.0 | U+11301..11303, 11305..1130C, 1130F..11310, 11313..11328, 1132A..11330, 11332..11333, 11335..11339, 1133D..11344, 11347..11348, 1134B..1134C, 11360..11363 | 65 | L2/11-298 | | Anderson, Deborah; McGowan, Rick; Whistler, Ken (2011-07-27), "I. GRANTHA", South Asian subcommittee report |
| 7.0 | U+11301..11303, 11305..1130C, 1130F..11310, 11313..11328, 1132A..11330, 11332..11333, 11335..11339, 1133D..11344, 11347..11348, 1134B..1134C, 11360..11363 | 65 | L2/11-326 | | Palaniappan, S. (2011-08-04), Comment on UTC document L2/11-186 |
| 7.0 | U+11301..11303, 11305..1130C, 1130F..11310, 11313..11328, 1132A..11330, 11332..11333, 11335..11339, 1133D..11344, 11347..11348, 1134B..1134C, 11360..11363 | 65 | L2/11-261R2 | | Moore, Lisa (2011-08-16), "D.6", UTC #128 / L2 #225 Minutes |
| 7.0 | U+11301..11303, 11305..1130C, 1130F..11310, 11313..11328, 1132A..11330, 11332..11333, 11335..11339, 1133D..11344, 11347..11348, 1134B..1134C, 11360..11363 | 65 | L2/11-330 | N4181 | Anderson, Deborah (2011-11-04), Proposed Additions to ISO/IEC 10646 |
| 7.0 | U+11301..11303, 11305..1130C, 1130F..11310, 11313..11328, 1132A..11330, 11332..11333, 11335..11339, 1133D..11344, 11347..11348, 1134B..1134C, 11360..11363 | 65 | L2/12-054 | | Sachithananthan, Maravanpulavu (2012-01-12), Letter regarding Grantha encoding |
| 7.0 | U+11301..11303, 11305..1130C, 1130F..11310, 11313..11328, 1132A..11330, 11332..11333, 11335..11339, 1133D..11344, 11347..11348, 1134B..1134C, 11360..11363 | 65 | L2/12-126 | | Logasundaram, N. D. (2012-04-25), Encoding of Grantham in SMP |
| 7.0 | U+11301..11303, 11305..1130C, 1130F..11310, 11313..11328, 1132A..11330, 11332..11333, 11335..11339, 1133D..11344, 11347..11348, 1134B..1134C, 11360..11363 | 65 | L2/12-151 | | Ganesan, Naga (2012-05-01), Brief Comments on UTC register documents (May 2012) on Grantha script encoding |
| 7.0 | U+11301..11303, 11305..1130C, 1130F..11310, 11313..11328, 1132A..11330, 11332..11333, 11335..11339, 1133D..11344, 11347..11348, 1134B..1134C, 11360..11363 | 65 | L2/12-190 | | Logasundaram, N. D. (2012-05-08), Clarification of Grantham comments |
| 7.0 | U+11301..11303, 11305..1130C, 1130F..11310, 11313..11328, 1132A..11330, 11332..11333, 11335..11339, 1133D..11344, 11347..11348, 1134B..1134C, 11360..11363 | 65 | | N4253 (pdf, doc) | "M59.09", Unconfirmed minutes of WG 2 meeting 59, 2012-09-12 |
| 7.0 | U+11301..11303, 11305..1130C, 1130F..11310, 11313..11328, 1132A..11330, 11332..11333, 11335..11339, 1133D..11344, 11347..11348, 1134B..1134C, 11360..11363 | 65 | L2/13-065 | | Logasundaram, L. D. (2013-04-14), The Sanskrit language must not be cloned inside the digital world |
| 7.0 | U+11301..11303, 11305..1130C, 1130F..11310, 11313..11328, 1132A..11330, 11332..11333, 11335..11339, 1133D..11344, 11347..11348, 1134B..1134C, 11360..11363 | 65 | L2/13-086 | | Anderson, Deborah; McGowan, Rick; Whistler, Ken; Pournader, Roozbeh (2013-04-26), "13", Recommendations to UTC on Script Proposals |
| 7.0 | U+11301..11303, 11305..1130C, 1130F..11310, 11313..11328, 1132A..11330, 11332..11333, 11335..11339, 1133D..11344, 11347..11348, 1134B..1134C, 11360..11363 | 65 | L2/13-084 | | Ganesan, Naga (2013-04-29), Comment on L2/13-065: Grantha characters from other Indic blocks such as Devanagari, Tamil, Bengali are NOT the solution |
| 7.0 | U+11301..11303, 11305..1130C, 1130F..11310, 11313..11328, 1132A..11330, 11332..11333, 11335..11339, 1133D..11344, 11347..11348, 1134B..1134C, 11360..11363 | 65 | L2/14-218 | | Sharma, Shriramana (2014-09-11), Unification of Tamil and Grantha numerals |
| 7.0 | U+11301..11303, 11305..1130C, 1130F..11310, 11313..11328, 1132A..11330, 11332..11333, 11335..11339, 1133D..11344, 11347..11348, 1134B..1134C, 11360..11363 | 65 | L2/14-268R | | Anderson, Deborah; Whistler, Ken; McGowan, Rick; Pournader, Roozbeh; Iancu, Laurențiu; Glass, Andrew; Constable, Peter; Suignard, Michel (2014-10-27), "2. Tamil and Grantha", Recommendations to UTC #141 October 2014 on Script Proposals |
| 7.0 | U+1133C | 1 | L2/15-256 | N4840 | Hosken, Martin (2015-10-26), Proposal to Add Tamil Nukta Character |
| 7.0 | U+1133C | 1 | L2/15-254 | | Moore, Lisa (2015-11-16), "Consensus 145-C10", UTC #145 Minutes |
| 7.0 | U+1134D | 1 | L2/09-258 | | Sharma, Shriramana (2009-08-02), Re: Grantha Proposal |
| 7.0 | U+1134D | 1 | L2/09-316 | | Sharma, Shriramana (2009-08-15), Comments on Mr Ganesan's Grantha Proposal |
| 7.0 | U+1134D | 1 | L2/09-375 | | Sharma, Shriramana (2009-10-06), Further clarification on Grantha virama-ligatures |
| 7.0 | U+1134D | 1 | L2/10-154 | | Ganesan, Naga (2010-05-01), Proposal to encode Grantha Chillu marker sign in Unicode/ISO 10646 |
| 7.0 | U+1134D | 1 | L2/10-194 | | Ganesan, Naga (2010-05-10), Grantha Chillu Marker at U+1134E in Unicode SMP, Comment on Section 8.d, L2/10-167 |
| 7.0 | U+1134D | 1 | L2/10-232 | | Sharma, Shriramana (2010-06-11), Official submission of a request regarding the Grantha Chillu Marker |
| 7.0 | U+1134D | 1 | L2/10-233 | | Sharma, Shriramana (2010-06-20), Request from scholars of the Grantha user community |
| 7.0 | U+1134D | 1 | L2/10-267 | | Sharma, Shriramana (2010-07-20), Comments on L2/09-345, 10-062 and 10-154 |
| 7.0 | U+1134D | 1 | L2/10-259 | | Sharma, Shriramana (2010-07-27), Follow-up #2 to my Grantha proposal L2/09-372 |
| 7.0 | U+1134D | 1 | L2/10-285 | | Shastri, Krishnamurti (2010-07-30), Comments on Grantha encoding |
| 7.0 | U+1134D | 1 | L2/10-284 | | Sharma, Shriramana (2010-08-03), Comments on L2/10-194 |
| 7.0 | U+1134D | 1 | L2/10-297 | | Ganesan, Naga (2010-08-06), Comment on L2/10-285: Handwritten styles in Tamil, Grantha, and English scripts - Touching vowel signs and viramas |
| 7.0 | U+1134D | 1 | L2/10-299R | | Anderson, Deborah; McGowan, Rick; Whistler, Ken (2010-08-06), "Chillu, Grantha User-feedback", Review of Indic-related L2 documents and Recommendations to the UTC |
| 7.0 | U+1134D | 1 | L2/10-303 | | Ganesan, Naga (2010-08-09), Proposal for a Grantha Character Name - Ligating Prepausal Virama at U+1134F |
| 7.0 | U+1134D | 1 | L2/10-405 | | Sharma, Shriramana (2010-09-17), On the GC of 1134D Grantha Sign Virama |
| 7.0 | U+1134D | 1 | L2/10-406 | | Ganesan, T. (2010-10-08), Letter regarding Grantha vowelless consonants |
| 7.0 | U+1134D | 1 | L2/10-404 | | Sharma, Shriramana (2010-10-10), Finalizing the Grantha virama model |
| 7.0 | U+1134D | 1 | L2/10-409 | | Jain, Manoj (2010-10-18), Unicode Standard for Grantha Script, Summary of the Meeting Sept 6th, New Delhi |
| 7.0 | U+1134D | 1 | L2/10-414 | | Nachimuthu, Krishnaswamy (2010-10-18), Letter regarding Grantha virama |
| 7.0 | U+1134D | 1 | L2/10-424 | | Niklas, Ulrike (2010-10-21), Letter regarding Prepausal Virama (Grantha) |
| 7.0 | U+1134D | 1 | L2/10-423 | | Sharma, Shriramana (2010-10-22), Response to L2/10-414 on the GRANTHA "PREPAUSAL" VIRAMA |
| 7.0 | U+1134D | 1 | L2/10-430 | | Ganesan, Naga (2010-10-26), Comment on L2/10-406: Grantha Prepausal Ligated Virama |
| 7.0 | U+1134D | 1 | L2/10-440 | | Anderson, Deborah; McGowan, Rick; Whistler, Ken (2010-10-27), "I. GRANTHA", Review of Indic-related L2 documents and Recommendations to the UTC |
| 7.0 | U+1134D | 1 | L2/10-447 | | Ganesan, Naga (2010-10-29), Consonant Clusters that need 3 sequences in Unicode Encoding in Grantha script |
| 7.0 | U+1134D | 1 | L2/10-332 | | Sharma, Shriramana (2012-08-21), Comments on L2/09-405, 10-297, -298 and -303 |
| 7.0 | U+1134D | 1 | L2/14-002 | | Sharma, Shriramana (2013-11-10), Finalizing the Grantha virama model |
| 7.0 | U+1134D | 1 | L2/14-020 | | Ganesan, Naga (2014-01-20), Plain-text Ligating Virama Representation for Grantha script |
| 7.0 | U+1134D | 1 | L2/14-053 | | Anderson, Deborah; Whistler, Ken; McGowan, Rick; Pournader, Roozbeh; Iancu, Laurențiu (2014-01-26), "6", Recommendations to UTC #138 February 2014 on Script Proposals |
| 7.0 | U+1134D | 1 | L2/14-097 | | Ganesan, Naga (2014-04-28), ZWJ Joiner for Chillu Consonants of Grantha Script |
| 7.0 | U+1134D | 1 | L2/14-110 | | Sharma, Shriramana (2014-05-02), Comments on L2/14-097 re using ZWJ for Grantha "chillus" |
| 7.0 | U+1134D | 1 | L2/14-129 | | Anderson, Deborah; Whistler, Ken; McGowan, Rick; Pournader, Roozbeh (2014-05-02), "4", Recommendations to UTC #139 May 2014 on Script Proposals |
| 7.0 | U+1134D | 1 | L2/14-162 | | Ganesan, Naga (2014-07-21), Control Characters (Joiners ZWNJ and ZWJ) in the Grantha Visible Virama and Chillu Consonants |
| 7.0 | U+1134D | 1 | L2/14-164 | | Ganesan, Naga (2014-07-22), Chillu examples |
| 7.0 | U+1134D | 1 | L2/14-170 | | Anderson, Deborah; Whistler, Ken; McGowan, Rick; Pournader, Roozbeh; Iancu, Laurențiu (2014-07-28), "2", Recommendations to UTC #140 August 2014 on Script Proposals |
| 7.0 | U+1134D | 1 | L2/14-279 | | Ganesan, Naga (2014-10-14), ZWJ for Grantha pre-pausal half-consonants (chillus) |
| 7.0 | U+1134D | 1 | L2/14-268R | | Anderson, Deborah; Whistler, Ken; McGowan, Rick; Pournader, Roozbeh; Iancu, Laurențiu; Glass, Andrew; Constable, Peter; Suignard, Michel (2014-10-27), "1. Grantha", Recommendations to UTC #141 October 2014 on Script Proposals |
| 7.0 | U+1134D | 1 | L2/14-291 | | Sharma, Shriramana (2014-10-29), Handling variation in vowelless consonant forms in Grantha |
| 7.0 | U+1134D | 1 | L2/15-045 | | Anderson, Deborah; Whistler, Ken; McGowan, Rick; Pournader, Roozbeh; Glass, Andrew (2015-01-30), "2. Grantha", Recommendations to UTC #142 February 2015 on Script Proposals |
| 7.0 | U+1134D | 1 | L2/15-067 | | Ganesan, Naga (2015-02-03), Revised Proposal for Plaintext Grantha Chillu Representation |
| 7.0 | U+11357 (Note: See also L2/09-141R, L2/09-206, L2/09-277, and L2/10-409) | 1 | L2/09-374 | | Sharma, Shriramana (2009-10-25), Request for encoding 11355 GRANTHA LENGTH MARK |
| 7.0 | U+11357 | 1 | L2/10-329 | | Sharma, Shriramana (2012-08-21), Follow-up to L2/09-374 |
| 7.0 | U+1135D (Note: See also L2/10-409 and L2/11-330) | 1 | L2/10-331 | N4136 | Sharma, Shriramana (2010-08-21), Request to encode 1135D GRANTHA SIGN PLUTA |
| 7.0 | U+1135D | 1 | L2/10-440 | | Anderson, Deborah; McGowan, Rick; Whistler, Ken (2010-10-27), "I. GRANTHA", Review of Indic-related L2 documents and Recommendations to the UTC |
| 7.0 | U+1135D | 1 | L2/10-416R | | Moore, Lisa (2010-11-09), "D.1, D.1.7", UTC #125 / L2 #222 Minutes |
| 7.0 | U+1135E..1135F, 11366..1136C, 11370..11374 (Note: See also L2/09-141R, L2/09-258, L2/09-372, L2/09-405, L2/10-265R, and L2/10-409) | 14 | L2/10-235 | | Sharma, Shriramana (2010-07-09), Proposal to encode Vedic characters for the Grantha script |
| 7.0 | U+1135E..1135F, 11366..1136C, 11370..11374 | 14 | L2/10-286 | | Sharma, Shriramana (2010-08-04), Comments on L2/10-274 |
| 7.0 | U+1135E..1135F, 11366..1136C, 11370..11374 | 14 | L2/10-299R | | Anderson, Deborah; McGowan, Rick; Whistler, Ken (2010-08-06), "Vedic Characters for Grantha", Review of Indic-related L2 documents and Recommendations to the UTC |
| 7.0 | U+1135E..1135F, 11366..1136C, 11370..11374 | 14 | L2/10-221 | | Moore, Lisa (2010-08-23), "D.8", UTC #124 / L2 #221 Minutes |
| 8.0 | U+11300 | 1 | L2/13-061 | N4432 | Sharma, Shriramana (2013-03-04), Proposal to encode 1137D Grantha Sign Combining Anusvara Above |
| 8.0 | U+11300 | 1 | L2/13-086 | | Anderson, Deborah; McGowan, Rick; Whistler, Ken; Pournader, Roozbeh (2013-04-26), "11", Recommendations to UTC on Script Proposals |
| 8.0 | U+11300 | 1 | L2/13-124 | | Kumar, Rajendra (2013-05-10), Letter from Gov't of India to Lisa Moore re recent documents |
| 8.0 | U+11300 | 1 | L2/13-058 | | Moore, Lisa (2013-06-12), "Consensus 135-C19", UTC #135 Minutes, "Accept U+1137D GRANTHA SIGN COMBINING ANUSVARA ABOVE for encoding in a future version of the standard, with properties as given in L2/13-061." |
| 8.0 | U+11300 | 1 | L2/13-179 | N4479 | Sharma, Shriramana (2013-09-04), Request to reallocate one character within the Grantha block |
| 8.0 | U+11300 | 1 | L2/13-210 | | Anderson, Deborah; Whistler, Ken; McGowan, Rick; Pournader, Roozbeh (2013-10-31), "9", Recommendations to UTC #137 November 2013 on Script Proposals |
| 8.0 | U+11300 | 1 | L2/13-200 | | Moore, Lisa (2013-11-18), "Consensus 137-C16", UTC #137 Minutes, "Change the codepoint for U+1137D Grantha Sign Combining Anusvara Above from U+1137D to U+11300." |
| 8.0 | U+11300 | 1 | | N4403 (pdf, doc) | Umamaheswaran, V. S. (2014-01-28), "10.3.14 Grantha Anusvara Above", Unconfirmed minutes of WG 2 meeting 61, Holiday Inn, Vilnius, Lithuania; 2013-06-10/14 |
| 8.0 | U+11300 | 1 | | N4553 (pdf, doc) | Umamaheswaran, V. S. (2014-09-16), "M62.05a, M62.05c", Minutes of WG 2 meeting 62 Adobe, San Jose, CA, USA |
| 8.0 | U+11350 (Note: See also L2/09-141R, L2/09-316, L2/09-345, and L2/10-409) | 1 | L2/10-062 | | Ganesan, Naga (2010-02-02), A note on Grantha OM sign (Comment on L2/10-053) |
| 8.0 | U+11350 | 1 | L2/10-167 | | Anderson, Deborah; McGowan, Rick; Whistler, Ken (2010-05-05), "6", Review of Indic-related L2 documents and Recommendations to the UTC |
| 8.0 | U+11350 | 1 | L2/10-267 | | Sharma, Shriramana (2010-07-20), Comments on L2/09-345, 10-062 and 10-154 |
| 8.0 | U+11350 | 1 | L2/10-263 | | Rajan, Vinodh (2010-07-28), Comments on Grantha OM |
| 8.0 | U+11350 | 1 | L2/10-274 | | Ganesan, Naga (2010-08-02), Usage Evidence for Grantha OM glyph |
| 8.0 | U+11350 | 1 | L2/10-286 | | Sharma, Shriramana (2010-08-04), Comments on L2/10-274 |
| 8.0 | U+11350 | 1 | L2/10-299R | | Anderson, Deborah; McGowan, Rick; Whistler, Ken (2010-08-06), "GRANTHA OM", Review of Indic-related L2 documents and Recommendations to the UTC |
| 8.0 | U+11350 | 1 | L2/10-328 | | Sharma, Shriramana (2010-08-10), Follow-up to L2/10-267 |
| 8.0 | U+11350 | 1 | L2/10-221 | | Moore, Lisa (2010-08-23), "D.8", UTC #124 / L2 #221 Minutes |
| 8.0 | U+11350 | 1 | L2/13-062 | N4431 | Sharma, Shriramana (2013-04-10), Proposal to encode 11350 GRANTHA OM |
| 8.0 | U+11350 | 1 | L2/13-086 | | Anderson, Deborah; McGowan, Rick; Whistler, Ken; Pournader, Roozbeh (2013-04-26), "12", Recommendations to UTC on Script Proposals |
| 8.0 | U+11350 | 1 | L2/13-081 | | Ganesan, Naga (2013-04-29), Comment on L2/13-062: Grantha OM in U+11350 code point |
| 8.0 | U+11350 | 1 | L2/13-124 | | Kumar, Rajendra (2013-05-10), Letter from Gov't of India to Lisa Moore re recent documents |
| 8.0 | U+11350 | 1 | L2/13-058 | | Moore, Lisa (2013-06-12), "Consensus 135-C18", UTC #135 Minutes, "Accept U+11350 GRANTHA OM for encoding in a future version of the standard, with properties as given in L2/13-062." |
| 8.0 | U+11350 | 1 | | N4403 (pdf, doc) | Umamaheswaran, V. S. (2014-01-28), "10.3.13 Grantha Om", Unconfirmed minutes of WG 2 meeting 61, Holiday Inn, Vilnius, Lithuania; 2013-06-10/14 |
| 11.0 | U+1133B | 1 | L2/15-256 | N4840 | Hosken, Martin (2015-10-26), Proposal to Add Tamil Nukta Character |
| 11.0 | U+1133B | 1 | L2/15-254 | | Moore, Lisa (2015-11-16), "D.2.1", UTC #145 Minutes |
| 11.0 | U+1133B | 1 | L2/16-035 | | Moore, Lisa (2016-01-21), Comments from Vasu Renganathan re Tamil Nukta |
| 11.0 | U+1133B | 1 | L2/16-030 | | Elangovan, Naga; Ramasamy, Krishnan; Logasundaram, N. D. (2016-01-22), Comments on the "Proposal to Add Tamil Nukta Character-L2/15-256" |
| 11.0 | U+1133B | 1 | L2/16-058 | | Sharma, Shriramana (2016-01-28), On the usage of nuktas in Tamil |
| 11.0 | U+1133B | 1 | L2/16-084 | | Ganesan, Naga (2016-04-20), Proposal to Encode Single-dot Sign at U+1133B Comment on M. Hosken's Badaga dot sign Proposal (L2/15-256) |
| 11.0 | U+1133B | 1 | L2/16-115 | | Sharma, Shriramana (2016-05-02), Comments on L2/16-084 "Proposal to encode single dot sign at 1133B" |
| 11.0 | U+1133B | 1 | L2/16-121 | | Moore, Lisa (2016-05-20), "D.9 Badaga dot sign", UTC #147 Minutes |
| 11.0 | U+1133B | 1 | L2/16-211 | | Ganesan, Naga (2016-07-26), Character Name of U+1133B |
| 11.0 | U+1133B | 1 | L2/16-224 | | Sharma, Shriramana (2016-08-02), Request to rename 1133B to GRANTHA SIGN ONE-DOT NUKTA |
| 11.0 | U+1133B | 1 | L2/16-203 | | Moore, Lisa (2016-08-18), "D.13", UTC #148 Minutes |
| 11.0 | U+1133B | 1 | L2/17-290 | | Ramachandran, Thiru T. K. (2017-07-28), Letter from Thiru T.K.Ramahandran to Lisa Moore (re Combining Bindu) |
| 11.0 | U+1133B | 1 | L2/17-288 | | Anderson, Deborah; Whistler, Ken; Constable, Peter; Suignard, Michel; Liang, Hai (2017-08-02), "9. From Srinidhi A and Sridatta A", Ad Hoc Recommendations on PRI 352 and PRI 353 |
| 11.0 | U+1133B | 1 | L2/17-302 | | Moore, Lisa (2017-08-17), Letter to T.K.Ramahandran Re: U+1133B COMBINING BINDU BELOW |
