= Grantha script =

South Indian script

Grantha script 𑌗𑍍𑌰𑌨𑍍𑌥
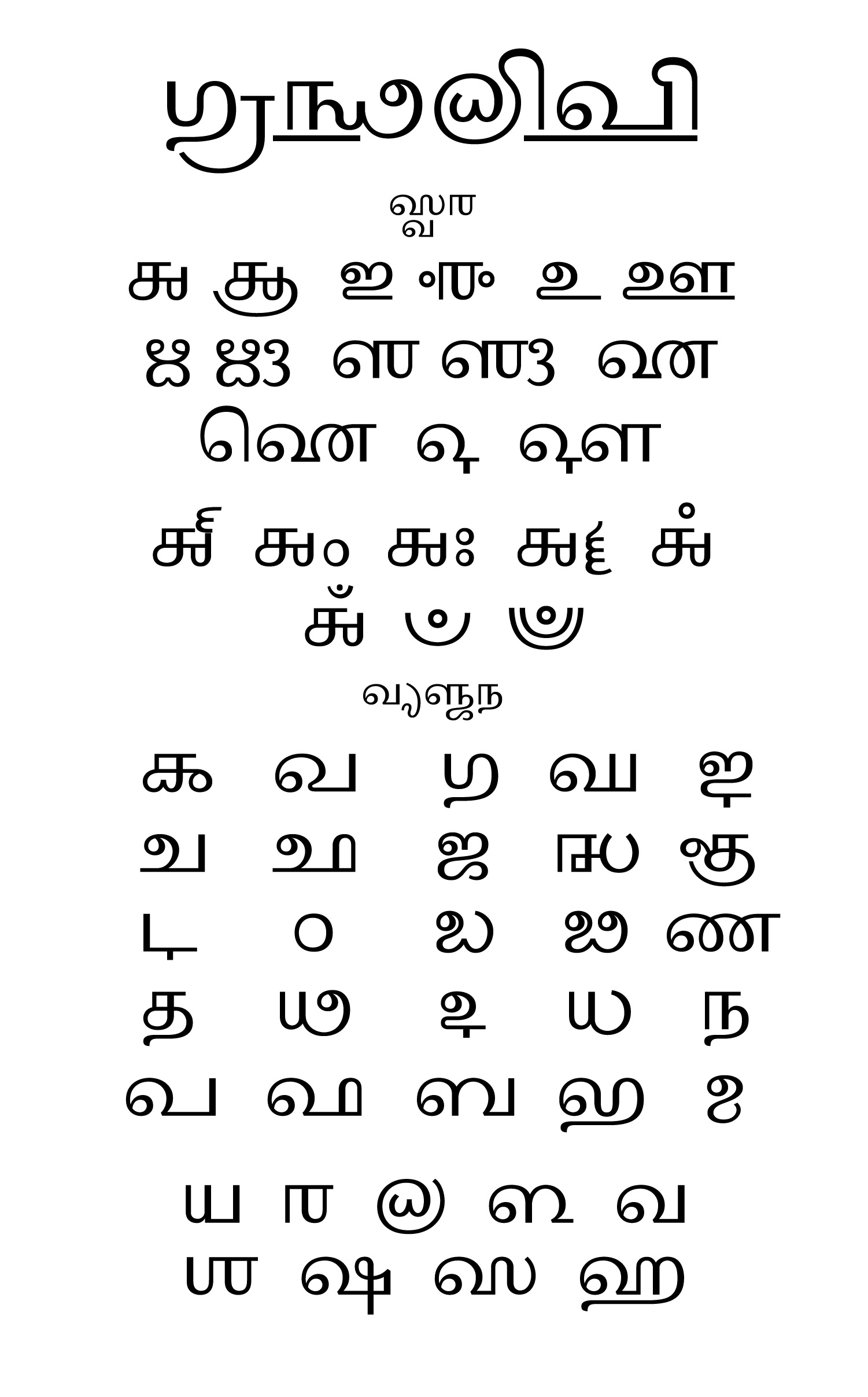
- The 'Grantha' Alphabet in modern typeface
- Script type: Abugida
- Period: 7th century CE – present (excluding Pallava Grantha)
- Direction: Left-to-right
- Languages: Tamil and Sanskrit

Related scripts
- Parent systems: Egyptian: Proto-Sinaitic; Phoenician; Aramaic (debated) (Note: The origin of the Brahmi script remains debated. The traditional view derives it from the Aramaic alphabet, while other scholars have proposed indigenous development or hybrid derivation involving multiple writing systems.); Brahmi; Tamil-Brahmi; Pallava; Grantha script
- Child systems: Malayalam; Tigalari; Thirke; Saurashtra; Dhives Akuru; Sinhala
- Sister systems: Tamil, Old Mon, Khmer, Cham, Kawi

ISO 15924
- ISO 15924: Gran (343), Grantha

Unicode
- Unicode alias: Grantha
- Unicode range: U+11300–U+1137F

The Grantha script (Sanskrit: 𑌗𑍍𑌰𑌨𑍍𑌥𑌲𑌿𑌪𑌿, romanized: granthalipi; Tamil: கிரந்த எழுத்து, romanized: Granta eḻuttu; Malayalam: ഗ്രന്ഥലിപി, romanized: granthalipi) is a classical South Indian Brahmic script, found particularly in Tamil Nadu and Kerala. Originating from the Pallava script, the Grantha script is related to Tamil and Vatteluttu scripts. The modern Malayalam script of Kerala is a direct descendant of the Grantha script. The Southeast Asian and Indonesian scripts such as Thai and Javanese respectively, as well as South Asian and Sri Lankan scripts such as Tigalari and Sinhalese scripts respectively, are derived or closely related to Grantha through the early Pallava script.

The Tamil purist movement of the colonial era sought to purge the Grantha script from use and use the Tamil script exclusively. According to Kailasapathy, this was a part of Tamil nationalism and amounted to regional ethnic chauvinism.

== Name ==
In Sanskrit, grantha is literally 'a knot'. It is a word that was used for books, and the script used to write them. This stems from the practice of binding inscribed palm leaves using a length of thread held by knots.

== History ==
The Pallava script or Pallava Grantha emerged in the 4th century CE and was used until the 7th century CE, in India. This early Grantha script was used to write Sanskrit texts, inscriptions on copper plates and stones of Hindu temples and monasteries. From it evolved Middle Grantha by the 7th century, and Transitional Grantha by about the 8th century, which remained in use until about the 14th century. Modern Grantha has been in use since the 14th century and into the modern era, to write classical texts in Sanskrit and Dravidian languages. It is also used to chant hymns and in traditional Vedic schools.

Francis (2024) distinguishes the Grantha and Tamil scripts as two closely related writing systems that were used for Sanskrit and Tamil respectively, while noting that the correspondence between language and script was not absolute: Sanskrit loanwords could be written with Grantha graphemes within otherwise Tamil inscriptions, and Tamil words would rarely be written in Grantha. Lockwood (2008) uses the terms “Grantha Sanskrit” and “Grantha Tamil” for the two related scripts, and more specifically “Pallava Grantha Sanskrit” and “Pallava Grantha Tamil” for their Pallava-period forms. He notes that the two forms were closely related, with corresponding letters deriving from the same Brāhmī source forms, but that individual letters could nevertheless differ in their shapes and orthographic functions.

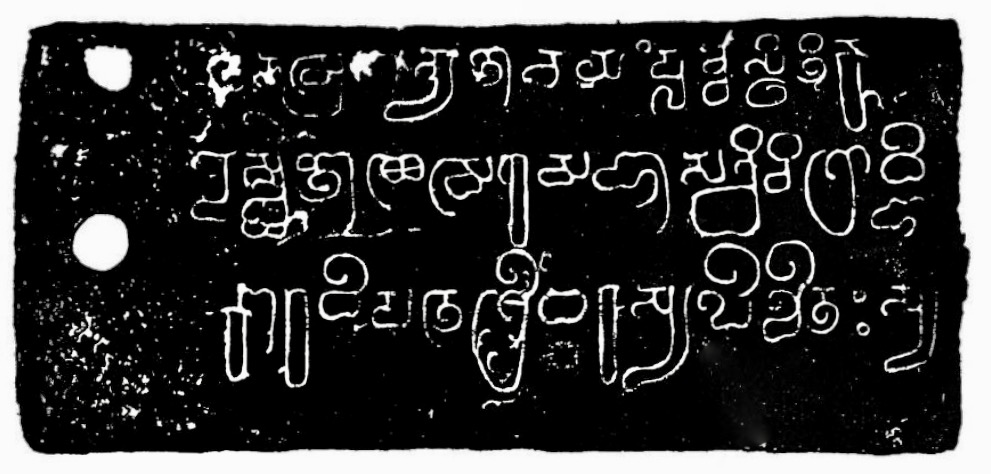
A Chera era Grantha inscription.

The Grantha script was also historically used for writing Manipravalam, a blend of Tamil and Sanskrit which was used in the exegesis of Manipravalam texts. This evolved into a fairly complex writing system which required that Tamil words be written in the Tamil script and Sanskrit words be written in the Grantha script. By the 15th century, this had evolved to the point that both scripts would be used within the same word – if the root was derived from Sanskrit it would be written in the Grantha script, but any Tamil suffixes which were added to it would be written using the Tamil script. This system of writing went out of use when Manipravalam declined in popularity, but it was customary to use the same convention in printed editions of texts originally written in Manipravalam until the middle of the 20th century.

In modern times, the Tamil-Grantha script is used in religious contexts by Tamil-speaking Hindus. For example, they use the script to write a child's name for the first time during the naming ceremony, for the Sanskrit portion of traditional wedding cards, and for announcements of a person's last rites. It is also used in many religious almanacs to print traditional formulaic summaries of the coming year.

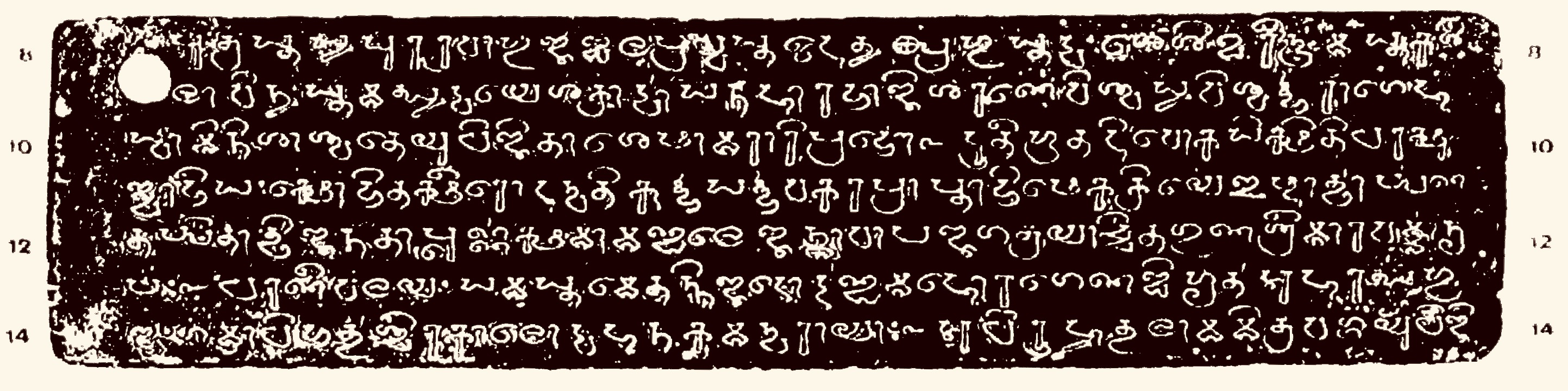
8th century Velvikudi grant inscription in the Grantha script (Sanskrit language).

== Types of Grantha ==
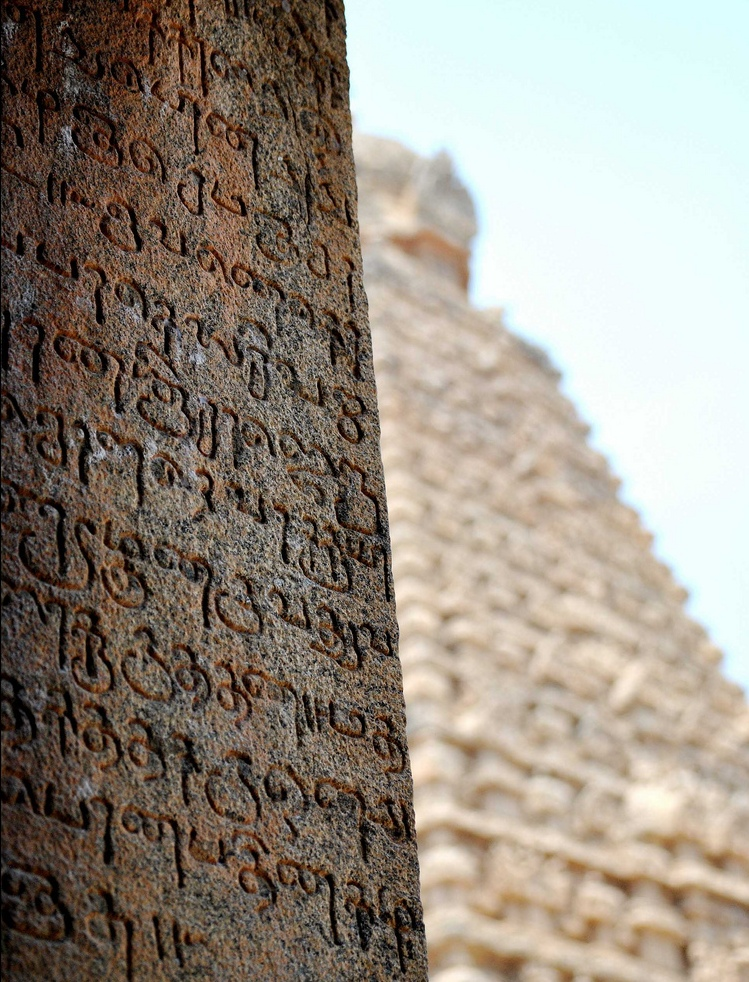
Grantha inscription at Bṛhadīśvara Temple, India

=== Pallava Grantha ===
An archaic and ornamental variety of Grantha is sometimes referred to as Pallava Grantha. It was used by the Pallava in some inscriptions from the 4th century CE to the 7th century CE, in India. Examples are the Mamallapuram Tiruchirapalli Rock Cut Cave Inscriptions and Kailasantha Inscription.

=== Middle Grantha ===
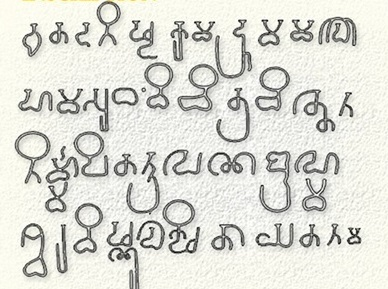
7th-century inscription in Grantha script at the Mandagapattu Hindu temple

Middle Grantha first appeared in the Kuram copper plates, dating from around 675 CE, and was used until the end of the 8th century CE.

=== Transitional Grantha ===
Transitional Grantha is traceable from the 8th or 9th century CE, until around the 14th century CE. The Tulu-Malayalam script is derivative of Transitional Grantha dating to the 8th or 9th century CE, which later split into two distinct scripts – Tigalari and Malayalam.

=== Modern Grantha ===
Grantha in the present form dates from the 14th century CE. The oldest modern manuscript has been dated to the end of the 16th century CE. Two varieties are found in modern era Grantha texts: the 'Brahmanic' or square form used by Hindus, and the 'Jain' or round form used by Jains.

== Modern Grantha ==
The Grantha script has evolved over time, and shares similarities with the modern Tamil Script.

=== Consonants ===
As in other Brahmic scripts Grantha consonant signs have an inherent vowel, typically corresponding to /a/, so, for example, the letter ⟨𑌕⟩ is pronounced /ka/.

Consonants
𑌕 ka	𑌖 kha	𑌗 ga	𑌘 gha	𑌙 ṅa				𑌹 ha
𑌚 ca	𑌛 cha	𑌜 ja	𑌝 jha	𑌞 ña	𑌯 ya		𑌶 śa	
𑌟 ṭa	𑌠 ṭha	𑌡 ḍa	𑌢 ḍha	𑌣 ṇa	𑌰 ra	𑌳 ḷa	𑌷 ṣa	
𑌤 ta	𑌥 tha	𑌦 da	𑌧 dha	𑌨 na	𑌲 la		𑌸 sa	
𑌪 pa	𑌫 pha	𑌬 ba	𑌭 bha	𑌮 ma	𑌵 va			

=== Consonant clusters ===
Grantha has two ways of representing consonant clusters. Sometimes, consonants in a cluster may form ligatures.

Consonant cluster ligatures
𑌕𑍍𑌷 kṣa	𑌕𑍍𑌤 kta	𑌙𑍍𑌗 ṅga	𑌜𑍍𑌞 jña	𑌞𑍍𑌚 ñca	𑌞𑍍𑌜 ñja	𑌤𑍍𑌥 ttha	𑌤𑍍𑌰 tra
𑌤𑍍𑌵 tva	𑌦𑍍𑌧 ddha	𑌦𑍍𑌵 dva	𑌨𑍍𑌤 nta	𑌨𑍍𑌤𑍍𑌵 ntva	𑌨𑍍𑌥 ntha	𑌨𑍍𑌦 nda	𑌨𑍍𑌧 ndha
𑌨𑍍𑌨 nna	𑌨𑍍𑌨𑍍 nn	𑌨𑍍𑌵 nva	𑌶𑍍𑌚 śca	𑌶𑍍𑌰 śra	𑌷𑍍𑌟 ṣṭa	𑌹𑍍𑌮 hma	

Ligatures are normally preferred whenever they exist. If no ligatures exist, "stacked" forms of consonants are written, just as in Kannada and Telugu, with the lowest member of the stack being the only "live" consonant and the other members all being vowel-less. Note that ligatures may be used as members of stacks also.

Stacked consonants
𑌤𑍍𑌤 tta	𑌤𑍍𑌤𑍍𑌵 ttva	𑌕𑍍𑌷𑍍𑌵 kṣva	𑌕𑍍𑌷𑍍𑌣 kṣṇa	𑌗𑍍𑌧𑍍𑌵 gdhva	𑌸𑍍𑌤𑍍𑌵 stva	𑌨𑍍𑌤𑍍𑌸 ntsa	𑌤𑍍𑌸𑍍𑌨 tsna

==== A few special cases ====
- When ⟨𑌯⟩, ya is the final consonant in a cluster, it is written as a ya-phala ⟨𑍍𑌯⟩.
- When a cluster contains a non-initial ⟨𑌰⟩, ra, it becomes a ra-vattu, ⟨𑍍𑌰⟩.
- When a cluster begins with a ⟨𑌰⟩, ra, it becomes a reph and is shifted to the end of the cluster.
- If a cluster contains both a reph and a ya-phala, the ya-phala is written last.

Consonant clusters with ⟨𑍍𑌯⟩, ⟨𑍍𑌰⟩, and reph.
𑌕𑍍𑌯 kya	𑌖𑍍𑌯 khya	𑌕𑍍𑌰 kra	𑌙𑍍𑌗𑍍𑌰 ṅgra	𑌙𑍍𑌗𑍍𑌰𑍍𑌯 ṅgrya	𑌦𑍍𑌧𑍍𑌯 ddhya
𑌰𑍍𑌕 rka	𑌰𑍍𑌕𑍍𑌷 rkṣa	𑌰𑍍𑌣 rṇa	𑌰𑍍𑌮 rma	𑌰𑍍𑌦𑍍𑌧 rddha	𑌰𑍍𑌦𑍍𑌵𑍍𑌯 rdvya

=== Vowels and syllables ===
Grantha includes five long vowels, five short vowels, two vocalic consonants, ṛ and ḷ which are treated as vowels and may be short or long, and two part-vowels, anusvara ⟨◌𑌂⟩ ṁ and visarga, ⟨◌𑌃⟩ ḥ. Independent vowel letters are used for word-initial vowels. Otherwise, vowels, vocalics, and part-vowels are written as diacritics attached to consonants. Each consonant in Grantha includes an inherent vowel a, so the letter ⟨𑌕⟩, for example, is pronounced ka. Adding a vowel diacritic modifies the vowel sound, so ⟨𑌕⟩ plus the diacritic ⟨𑌓⟩, gives the syllable ⟨𑌕𑍋⟩, ko. The absence of a vowel is marked with a virāma ⟨◌𑍍⟩, for example, ⟨𑌕⟩ ka plus ⟨◌𑍍⟩ creates an isolated consonant ⟨𑌕𑍍⟩ k.

Short vowels, vocalics, half vowels, diacritics, and examples with ⟨𑌕⟩, ka.
𑌅 a	𑌇 i	𑌉 u	𑌋 ṛ	𑌌 ḷ	𑌏 e	𑌓 o	◌ (Note: The virama has no independent form because it is not a vowel. It is a diacritic that suppresses a letter's inherent vowel, leaving an isolated consonant.)	◌ (Note: The anusvara and visarga have no independent forms because they can only modify a syllable's vowel.)	◌
◌ (Note: The vowel a has no corresponding diacritic since every consonant carries an inherent a.)	◌𑌿	◌𑍁	◌𑍃	◌𑍢	◌𑍇	◌𑍋	◌𑍍	𑌂 ṁ	𑌃 ḥ
𑌕 ka	𑌕𑌿 ki	𑌕𑍁 ku	𑌕𑍃 kṛ	𑌕𑍢 kḷ	𑌕𑍇 ke	𑌕𑍋 ko	𑌕𑍍 k	𑌕𑌂 kaṁ	𑌕𑌃 kaḥ

Long vowels, their diacritics, and examples with ⟨𑌮⟩, ma.
𑌆 ā	𑌈 ī	𑌊 ū	𑍠 ṝ	𑍡 ḹ	𑌐 ai	𑌔 au
◌𑌾	◌𑍀	◌𑍂	◌𑍄	◌𑍣	◌𑍈	◌𑍌
𑌮𑌾 mā	𑌮𑍀 mī	𑌮𑍂 mū	𑌮𑍄 mṝ	𑌮𑍣 mḹ	𑌮𑍈 mai	𑌮𑍌 mau

There are a few ligatures of consonants with vowel diacritics and of consonants with virāma.

𑌟+ ◌𑌿 𑌟𑌿 ṭi	𑌟+ ◌𑍀 𑌟𑍀 ṭī	𑌳+ ◌𑍀 𑌳𑍀 ḷī	𑌟 + ◌𑍍 𑌟𑍍 ṭ	𑌤 + ◌𑍍 𑌤𑍍 t	𑌨+ ◌𑍍 𑌨𑍍 n	𑌮 + ◌𑍍 𑌮𑍍 m

==== Compound table of Grantha letters ====
The following table lists vowel letters across the top and consonant letters along the side, the combination of which gives all Grantha compound letters.

Consonants (vowel suppressed)		Vowels													
Consonants (vowel suppressed)		∅ a	◌𑌾 ā	◌𑌿 i	◌𑍀 ī	◌𑍁 u	◌𑍂 ū	◌𑍃 ṛ	◌𑍄 ṝ	◌𑍢 ḷ	◌𑍣 ḹ	◌𑍇 e	◌𑍈 ai	◌𑍋 o	◌𑍌 au
∅ (Independent)		𑌅	𑌆	𑌇	𑌈	𑌉	𑌊	𑌋	𑍠	𑌌	𑍡	𑌏	𑌐	𑌓	𑌔
𑌕𑍍	k	𑌕	𑌕𑌾	𑌕𑌿	𑌕𑍀	𑌕𑍁	𑌕𑍂	𑌕𑍃	𑌕𑍄	𑌕𑍢	𑌕𑍣	𑌕𑍇	𑌕𑍈	𑌕𑍋	𑌕𑍌
𑌖𑍍	kh	𑌖	𑌖𑌾	𑌖𑌿	𑌖𑍀	𑌖𑍁	𑌖𑍂	𑌖𑍃	𑌖𑍄	𑌖𑍢	𑌖𑍣	𑌖𑍇	𑌖𑍈	𑌖𑍋	𑌖𑍌
𑌗𑍍	g	𑌗	𑌗𑌾	𑌗𑌿	𑌗𑍀	𑌗𑍁	𑌗𑍂	𑌗𑍃	𑌗𑍄	𑌗𑍢	𑌗𑍣	𑌗𑍇	𑌗𑍈	𑌗𑍋	𑌗𑍌
𑌘𑍍	gh	𑌘	𑌘𑌾	𑌘𑌿	𑌘𑍀	𑌘𑍁	𑌘𑍂	𑌘𑍃	𑌘𑍄	𑌘𑍢	𑌘𑍣	𑌘𑍇	𑌘𑍈	𑌘𑍋	𑌘𑍌
𑌙𑍍	ṅ	𑌙	𑌙𑌾	𑌙𑌿	𑌙𑍀	𑌙𑍁	𑌙𑍂	𑌙𑍃	𑌙𑍄	𑌙𑍢	𑌙𑍣	𑌙𑍇	𑌙𑍈	𑌙𑍋	𑌙𑍌
𑌚𑍍	c	𑌚	𑌚𑌾	𑌚𑌿	𑌚𑍀	𑌚𑍁	𑌚𑍂	𑌚𑍃	𑌚𑍄	𑌚𑍢	𑌚𑍣	𑌚𑍇	𑌚𑍈	𑌚𑍋	𑌚𑍌
𑌛𑍍	ch	𑌛	𑌛𑌾	𑌛𑌿	𑌛𑍀	𑌛𑍁	𑌛𑍂	𑌛𑍃	𑌛𑍄	𑌛𑍢	𑌛𑍣	𑌛𑍇	𑌛𑍈	𑌛𑍋	𑌛𑍌
𑌜𑍍	j	𑌜	𑌜𑌾	𑌜𑌿	𑌜𑍀	𑌜𑍁	𑌜𑍂	𑌜𑍃	𑌜𑍄	𑌜𑍢	𑌜𑍣	𑌜𑍇	𑌜𑍈	𑌜𑍋	𑌜𑍌
𑌝𑍍	jh	𑌝	𑌝𑌾	𑌝𑌿	𑌝𑍀	𑌝𑍁	𑌝𑍂	𑌝𑍃	𑌝𑍄	𑌝𑍢	𑌝𑍣	𑌝𑍇	𑌝𑍈	𑌝𑍋	𑌝𑍌
𑌞𑍍	ñ	𑌞	𑌞𑌾	𑌞𑌿	𑌞𑍀	𑌞𑍁	𑌞𑍂	𑌞𑍃	𑌞𑍄	𑌞𑍢	𑌞𑍣	𑌞𑍇	𑌞𑍈	𑌞𑍋	𑌞𑍌
𑌟𑍍	ṭ	𑌟	𑌟𑌾	𑌟𑌿	𑌟𑍀	𑌟𑍁	𑌟𑍂	𑌟𑍃	𑌟𑍄	𑌟𑍢	𑌟𑍣	𑌟𑍇	𑌟𑍈	𑌟𑍋	𑌟𑍌
𑌠𑍍	ṭh	𑌠	𑌠𑌾	𑌠𑌿	𑌠𑍀	𑌠𑍁	𑌠𑍂	𑌠𑍃	𑌠𑍄	𑌠𑍢	𑌠𑍣	𑌠𑍇	𑌠𑍈	𑌠𑍋	𑌠𑍌
𑌡𑍍	ḍ	𑌡	𑌡𑌾	𑌡𑌿	𑌡𑍀	𑌡𑍁	𑌡𑍂	𑌡𑍃	𑌡𑍄	𑌡𑍢	𑌡𑍣	𑌡𑍇	𑌡𑍈	𑌡𑍋	𑌡𑍌
𑌢𑍍	ḍh	𑌢	𑌢𑌾	𑌢𑌿	𑌢𑍀	𑌢𑍁	𑌢𑍂	𑌢𑍃	𑌢𑍄	𑌢𑍢	𑌢𑍣	𑌢𑍇	𑌢𑍈	𑌢𑍋	𑌢𑍌
𑌣𑍍	ṇ	𑌣	𑌣𑌾	𑌣𑌿	𑌣𑍀	𑌣𑍁	𑌣𑍂	𑌣𑍃	𑌣𑍄	𑌣𑍢	𑌣𑍣	𑌣𑍇	𑌣𑍈	𑌣𑍋	𑌣𑍌
𑌤𑍍	t	𑌤	𑌤𑌾	𑌤𑌿	𑌤𑍀	𑌤𑍁	𑌤𑍂	𑌤𑍃	𑌤𑍄	𑌤𑍢	𑌤𑍣	𑌤𑍇	𑌤𑍈	𑌤𑍋	𑌤𑍌
𑌥𑍍	th	𑌥	𑌥𑌾	𑌥𑌿	𑌥𑍀	𑌥𑍁	𑌥𑍂	𑌥𑍃	𑌥𑍄	𑌥𑍢	𑌥𑍣	𑌥𑍇	𑌥𑍈	𑌥𑍋	𑌥𑍌
𑌦𑍍	d	𑌦	𑌦𑌾	𑌦𑌿	𑌦𑍀	𑌦𑍁	𑌦𑍂	𑌦𑍃	𑌦𑍄	𑌦𑍢	𑌦𑍣	𑌦𑍇	𑌦𑍈	𑌦𑍋	𑌦𑍌
𑌧𑍍	dh	𑌧	𑌧𑌾	𑌧𑌿	𑌧𑍀	𑌧𑍁	𑌧𑍂	𑌧𑍃	𑌧𑍄	𑌧𑍢	𑌧𑍣	𑌧𑍇	𑌧𑍈	𑌧𑍋	𑌧𑍌
𑌨𑍍	n	𑌨	𑌨𑌾	𑌨𑌿	𑌨𑍀	𑌨𑍁	𑌨𑍂	𑌨𑍃	𑌨𑍄	𑌨𑍢	𑌨𑍣	𑌨𑍇	𑌨𑍈	𑌨𑍋	𑌨𑍌
𑌪𑍍	p	𑌪	𑌪𑌾	𑌪𑌿	𑌪𑍀	𑌪𑍁	𑌪𑍂	𑌪𑍃	𑌪𑍄	𑌪𑍢	𑌪𑍣	𑌪𑍇	𑌪𑍈	𑌪𑍋	𑌪𑍌
𑌫𑍍	ph	𑌫	𑌫𑌾	𑌫𑌿	𑌫𑍀	𑌫𑍁	𑌫𑍂	𑌫𑍃	𑌫𑍄	𑌫𑍢	𑌫𑍣	𑌫𑍇	𑌫𑍈	𑌫𑍋	𑌫𑍌
𑌬𑍍	b	𑌬	𑌬𑌾	𑌬𑌿	𑌬𑍀	𑌬𑍁	𑌬𑍂	𑌬𑍃	𑌬𑍄	𑌬𑍢	𑌬𑍣	𑌬𑍇	𑌬𑍈	𑌬𑍋	𑌬𑍌
𑌭𑍍	bh	𑌭	𑌭𑌾	𑌭𑌿	𑌭𑍀	𑌭𑍁	𑌭𑍂	𑌭𑍃	𑌭𑍄	𑌭𑍢	𑌭𑍣	𑌭𑍇	𑌭𑍈	𑌭𑍋	𑌭𑍌
𑌮𑍍	m	𑌮	𑌮𑌾	𑌮𑌿	𑌮𑍀	𑌮𑍁	𑌮𑍂	𑌮𑍃	𑌮𑍄	𑌮𑍢	𑌮𑍣	𑌮𑍇	𑌮𑍈	𑌮𑍋	𑌮𑍌
𑌯𑍍	y	𑌯	𑌯𑌾	𑌯𑌿	𑌯𑍀	𑌯𑍁	𑌯𑍂	𑌯𑍃	𑌯𑍄	𑌯𑍢	𑌯𑍣	𑌯𑍇	𑌯𑍈	𑌯𑍋	𑌯𑍌
𑌰𑍍	r	𑌰	𑌰𑌾	𑌰𑌿	𑌰𑍀	𑌰𑍁	𑌰𑍂	𑌰𑍃	𑌰𑍄	𑌰𑍢	𑌰𑍣	𑌰𑍇	𑌰𑍈	𑌰𑍋	𑌰𑍌
𑌲𑍍	l	𑌲	𑌲𑌾	𑌲𑌿	𑌲𑍀	𑌲𑍁	𑌲𑍂	𑌲𑍃	𑌲𑍄	𑌲𑍢	𑌲𑍣	𑌲𑍇	𑌲𑍈	𑌲𑍋	𑌲𑍌
𑌵𑍍	v	𑌵	𑌵𑌾	𑌵𑌿	𑌵𑍀	𑌵𑍁	𑌵𑍂	𑌵𑍃	𑌵𑍄	𑌵𑍢	𑌵𑍣	𑌵𑍇	𑌵𑍈	𑌵𑍋	𑌵𑍌
𑌶𑍍	ś	𑌶	𑌶𑌾	𑌶𑌿	𑌶𑍀	𑌶𑍁	𑌶𑍂	𑌶𑍃	𑌶𑍄	𑌶𑍢	𑌶𑍣	𑌶𑍇	𑌶𑍈	𑌶𑍋	𑌶𑍌
𑌷𑍍	ṣ	𑌷	𑌷𑌾	𑌷𑌿	𑌷𑍀	𑌷𑍁	𑌷𑍂	𑌷𑍃	𑌷𑍄	𑌷𑍢	𑌷𑍣	𑌷𑍇	𑌷𑍈	𑌷𑍋	𑌷𑍌
𑌸𑍍	s	𑌸	𑌸𑌾	𑌸𑌿	𑌸𑍀	𑌸𑍁	𑌸𑍂	𑌸𑍃	𑌸𑍄	𑌸𑍢	𑌸𑍣	𑌸𑍇	𑌸𑍈	𑌸𑍋	𑌸𑍌
𑌹𑍍	h	𑌹	𑌹𑌾	𑌹𑌿	𑌹𑍀	𑌹𑍁	𑌹𑍂	𑌹𑍃	𑌹𑍄	𑌹𑍢	𑌹𑍣	𑌹𑍇	𑌹𑍈	𑌹𑍋	𑌹𑍌
𑌳𑍍	ḷ	𑌳	𑌳𑌾	𑌳𑌿	𑌳𑍀	𑌳𑍁	𑌳𑍂	𑌳𑍃	𑌳𑍄	𑌳𑍢	𑌳𑍣	𑌳𑍇	𑌳𑍈	𑌳𑍋	𑌳𑍌

=== Numerals ===
0 ௦	1 ௧	2 ௨	3 ௩	4 ௪	5 ௫	6 ௬	7 ௭	8 ௮	9 ௯

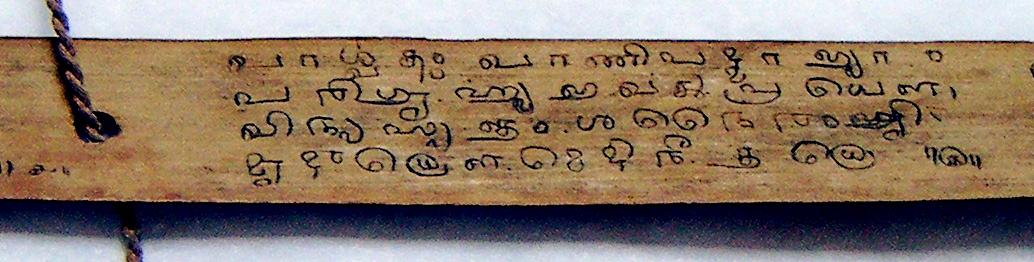
A palm leaf manuscript in Sanskrit written in Grantha script.

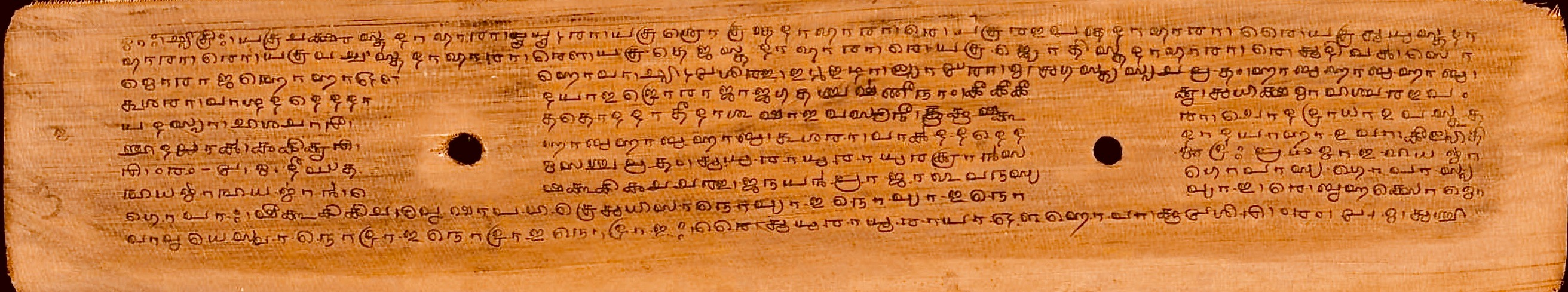
A Grantha script on palm leaf copy of the Samaveda, a Sanskrit Vedic text.

== Sample text ==
Below is Article 1 of the Universal Declaration of Human Rights in the Sanskrit language:

Sanskrit in Grantha Script

𑌸𑌰𑍍𑌵𑍇 𑌮𑌾𑌨𑌵𑌾𑌃 𑌸𑍍𑌵𑌤𑌨𑍍𑌤𑍍𑌰𑌾𑌃 𑌸𑌮𑍁𑌤𑍍𑌪𑌨𑍍𑌨𑌾𑌃 𑌵𑌰𑍍𑌤𑌨𑍍𑌤𑍇 𑌅𑌪𑌿 𑌚, 𑌗𑍌𑌰𑌵𑌦𑍃𑌶𑌾 𑌅𑌧𑌿𑌕𑌾𑌰𑌦𑍃𑌶𑌾 𑌚 𑌸𑌮𑌾𑌨𑌾𑌃 𑌏𑌵 𑌵𑌰𑍍𑌤𑌨𑍍𑌤𑍇। 𑌏𑌤𑍇 𑌸𑌰𑍍𑌵𑍇 𑌚𑍇𑌤𑌨𑌾-𑌤𑌰𑍍𑌕-𑌶𑌕𑍍𑌤𑌿𑌭𑍍𑌯𑌾𑌂 𑌸𑍁𑌸𑌮𑍍𑌪𑌨𑍍𑌨𑌾𑌃 𑌸𑌨𑍍𑌤𑌿। 𑌅𑌪𑌿 𑌚, 𑌸𑌰𑍍𑌵𑍇𑌽𑌪𑌿 𑌬𑌨𑍍𑌧𑍁𑌤𑍍𑌵-𑌭𑌾𑌵𑌨𑌯𑌾 𑌪𑌰𑌸𑍍𑌪𑌰𑌂 𑌵𑍍𑌯𑌵𑌹𑌰𑌨𑍍𑌤𑍁।

IAST transliteration

sarve mānavāḥ svatantrāḥ samutpannāḥ vartante api ca, gauravadr̥śā adhikāradr̥śā ca samānāḥ eva vartante. ete sarve cetanā-tarka-śaktibhyāṁ susampannāḥ santi. api ca, sarve´pi bandhutva-bhāvanayā parasparaṁ vyavaharantu.

English

All human beings are born free and equal in dignity and rights. They are endowed with reason and conscience and should act towards one another in a spirit of brotherhood.

== Comparison with other South Indian and Sri Lankan scripts ==
Comparison of some Grantha letters with Malayalam, Sinhalese, and Tamil
Grantha	ka 𑌕	ṅa 𑌙	ca 𑌚	ña 𑌞	ṭa 𑌟	ṇa 𑌣	ta 𑌤	na 𑌨	pa 𑌪	ma 𑌮
Malayalam	ക	ങ	ച	ഞ	ട	ണ	ത	ന	പ	മ
Sinhalese	ක	ඞ	ච	ඤ	ට	ණ	ත	න	ප	ම
Tamil	க	ங	ச	ஞ	ட	ண	த	ந	ப	ம

== Unicode ==
Grantha script was added to the Unicode Standard in June 2014 with the release of version 7.0. The Unicode block for Grantha is U+11300–U+1137F:

Grantha^{[1]}^{[2]} Official Unicode Consortium code chart (PDF)
	0	1	2	3	4	5	6	7	8	9	A	B	C	D	E	F
U+1130x	𑌀	𑌁	𑌂	𑌃		𑌅	𑌆	𑌇	𑌈	𑌉	𑌊	𑌋	𑌌			𑌏
U+1131x	𑌐			𑌓	𑌔	𑌕	𑌖	𑌗	𑌘	𑌙	𑌚	𑌛	𑌜	𑌝	𑌞	𑌟
U+1132x	𑌠	𑌡	𑌢	𑌣	𑌤	𑌥	𑌦	𑌧	𑌨		𑌪	𑌫	𑌬	𑌭	𑌮	𑌯
U+1133x	𑌰		𑌲	𑌳		𑌵	𑌶	𑌷	𑌸	𑌹		𑌻	𑌼	𑌽	𑌾	𑌿
U+1134x	𑍀	𑍁	𑍂	𑍃	𑍄			𑍇	𑍈			𑍋	𑍌	𑍍		
U+1135x	𑍐							𑍗						𑍝	𑍞	𑍟
U+1136x	𑍠	𑍡	𑍢	𑍣			𑍦	𑍧	𑍨	𑍩	𑍪	𑍫	𑍬			
U+1137x	𑍰	𑍱	𑍲	𑍳	𑍴											
Notes 1.As of Unicode version 18.0 2.Grey areas indicate non-assigned code points

=== Unification with Tamil ===
Some proposed to reunify Grantha and Tamil; however, the proposal triggered discontent by some. Considering the sensitivity involved, it was determined that the two scripts should not be unified, except for the numerals.
