= Mygurudu =

Mygurudu is a Malayalam-based secret language developed in Northern Kerala during the Malabar Rebellion of 1921. Prisoners used this coded language to pass messages without getting leaked.

== Concepts ==
The fundamental idea behind Mygurudu involves the swapping of Malayalam alphabets. For example, Mygurudu uses ‘Ra’ instead of ‘Cha’, and ‘Pa’ instead of ‘Na’.

== Current State ==
Mygurudu had about 400 speakers before 2020, however, the number of speakers has reached 900, and 2,500+ people are learning right now. This is mostly due to online platforms increasing accessibility to language learning resources. The Speech Science Research Forum of the Department of Linguistics of Kerala University has digitized and documented the structure of Mygurudu and other dying languages.

== The scheme ==
The following tables give the transposition scheme used in the Mygurudu code.

=== Vowels ===
Clear text	അ	ആ	ഇ	ഈ	ഉ	ഊ	ഋ	എ	ഏ	ഐ	ഒ	ഓ	ഔ	അം	അഃ
Cipher text	സ	സാ	സി	സീ	സു	സൂ	സൃ	സെ	സേ	സൈ	സൊ	സോ	സൗ	സം	സ:

=== Consonants ===
Clear text	ക	ങ	ച	വ	ണ്ട	പ	റ	ഞ	ങ്ക	മ്പ	ന്ത	ബ
Cipher text	മ	യ	ര	ട	ഷ	ന	ണ	ള	റ്റ	ഞ്ച	ഹ	ജ

=== Mnemonic ===
The users had developed a mnemonic to learn and remember this language. The mnemonic was very similar to Sanskrit slokas.

കമ ങയ ചര വട ണ്ടഷ

പന റണ ഞള ങ്കറ്റ മ്പഞ്ച

ന്തഹ ബജ

=== Examples ===
Clear text	എന്താ പേര്	എവിടാ വീട്	ഒരു ചായ വേണം	കടി വേണോ	വേണ്ട
Cipher text	സെഹാ നേച്ച്	സെടീവാ ടീവ്	സൊചു രാങ ടേറം	മവി ടേറോ	ടേഷ

== See also ==
- Mulabhadra, another Malayalam-based secret language from erstwhile Travancore state (Southern Kerala)
- Byari language of Beary people
