= Krishnagatha =

Poem in Malayalam

Krishnagatha (Malayalam: കൃഷ്ണഗാഥ) is a 15th-century poem written in Malayalam language; It is also known as Krishnapattu. it belongs to the poetic form Gatha. The author of the poem is believed to be Cherusseri Namboothiri, who lived in Cherusseri near Vatakara in Kerala, India. It deals with the story of Krishna.

== Topic ==
The poem depicts the stories of Krishna from his birth to ascension. It describes the story as in Bhagavata. It consists of forty-seven stories.

== Features ==
It was written in Malayalam language, at a time when literary works were usually written in Sanskrit or Tamil.

The poem gives importance to rhyme in second letters and third letters. It has some words and phrases which are no longer used in the Malayalam language. It also contains ancient forms of some proverbs.

It uses most of the figure of speeches in Sanskrit language, like Upama, Ulpreksha and Rupakam. The poem is written in the metre Manjari.
