= Thirunizhalmala =

13th century "pattu" genre poem in the Malayalam language

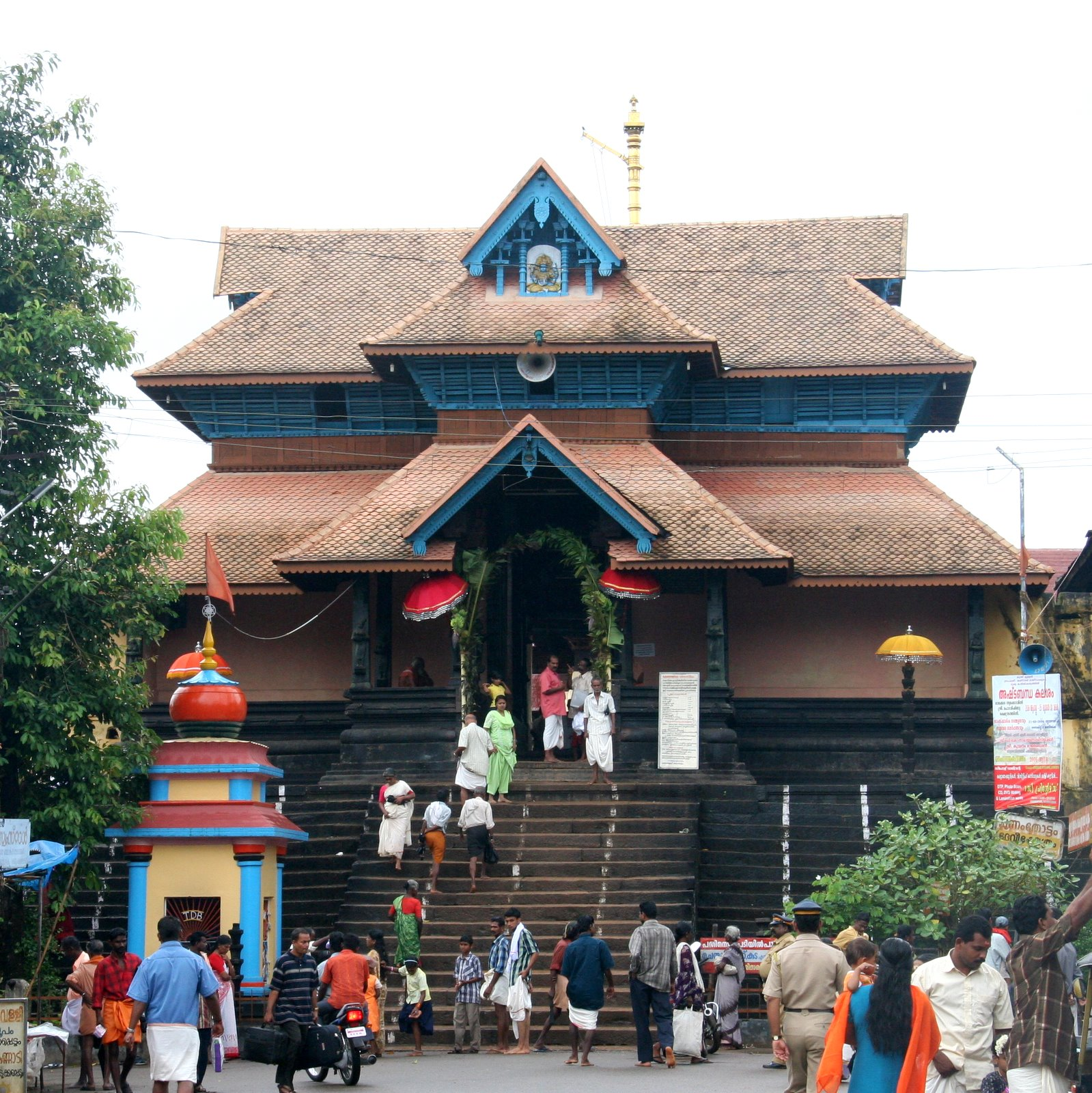
- Aranmula Temple, Pathanamthitta
- Written: c. 13th century
- Country: Aranmula
- Language: Malayalam
- Genre: "Pattu" genre

Thirunizhalmala ("Garland of the Sacred Shade" or "Grace") is a c. 13th century "pattu" genre poem in the Malayalam language. Along with "Ramacharitham", it is one of the earliest extant poems in Malayalam. It is generally considered to be a work associated with the Vaishnavite bhakti movement in south India. It is sometimes referred to as "the first religious work in the Malayalam". "Thirunizhalmala" was discovered by the scholar M. M. Purushothaman Nair in 1980.

The poem was most probably composed by a high-caste poet (from a certain "Kurumur Palli"), using local meters and Dravidian orthography. It is assumed that the work predates the famous "Ramacharitham" by around a century. The manuscript of the poem was discovered in northern Kerala. The central theme of the poem is the description of the ritual life of the Aranmula Temple in Pathanamthitta. The main rites described are the ancient rituals of the Malayar or Malayan community, performed to remove the various impurities of the gods. It also describes the temple and its surroundings, the families of the temple-villages' owners, and the protecting soldiery.

"Thirunizhalmala" is linked to the north Kerala art form Theyyam and the community of its performers. The poem contains the earliest instance in Malayalam of the legend of Parasurama "founding" Kerala and establishing the sixty-four Brahmin settlements. It also mentions the medieval Tamil poet Kamban.

Modern editions of "Thirunizhalmala" have been published by M. M. Purushothaman Nair (1981 and 2016) and R. C. Karippath (2006).
