= Tamil Braille =

Bharati braille alphabet

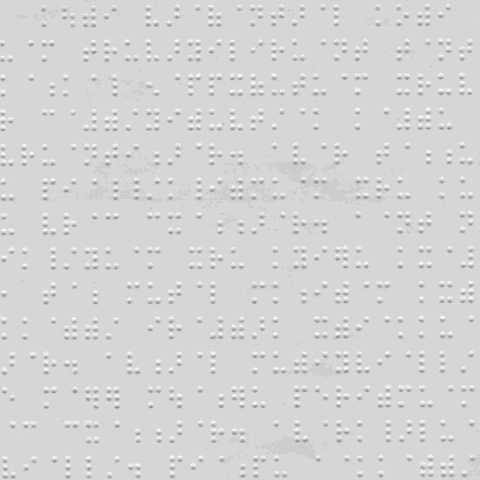
- Script type: Alphabet
- Print basis: Tamil alphabet
- Languages: Tamil

Related scripts
- Parent systems: Braille: English Braille; Bharati Braille; Tamil Braille

Tamil Braille is the smallest of the Bharati braille alphabets. (For the general system and for punctuation, see that article.)

== Alphabet ==
Vowel letters are used rather than diacritics, and they occur after consonants in their spoken order.

Print	அ	ஆ	இ	ஈ	உ	ஊ	எ	ஏ	ஐ	ஒ	ஓ	ஔ
ISO	a	ā	i	ī	u	ū	e	ē	ai	o	ō	au
Braille	⠁ (braille pattern dots-1)	⠜ (braille pattern dots-345)	⠊ (braille pattern dots-24)	⠔ (braille pattern dots-35)	⠥ (braille pattern dots-136)	⠳ (braille pattern dots-1256)	⠢ (braille pattern dots-26)	⠑ (braille pattern dots-15)	⠌ (braille pattern dots-34)	⠭ (braille pattern dots-1346)	⠕ (braille pattern dots-135)	⠪ (braille pattern dots-246)

Print	க	ங	ச	ஜ	ஞ	ட	ண	த	ந	ப	ம
ISO	k	ṅ	c	j	ñ	ṭ	ṇ	t	n	p	m
Braille	⠅ (braille pattern dots-13)	⠬ (braille pattern dots-346)	⠉ (braille pattern dots-14)	⠚ (braille pattern dots-245)	⠒ (braille pattern dots-25)	⠾ (braille pattern dots-23456)	⠼ (braille pattern dots-3456)	⠞ (braille pattern dots-2345)	⠝ (braille pattern dots-1345)	⠏ (braille pattern dots-1234)	⠍ (braille pattern dots-134)

Print	ய	ர	ல	ள	வ	ஶ	ஷ	ஸ	ஹ	க்ஷ	ற	ழ	ன
ISO	y	r	l	ḷ	v	ś	ṣ	s	h	kṣ	ṟ	ḻ	ṉ
Braille	⠽ (braille pattern dots-13456)	⠗ (braille pattern dots-1235)	⠇ (braille pattern dots-123)	⠸ (braille pattern dots-456)	⠧ (braille pattern dots-1236)	⠩ (braille pattern dots-146)	⠯ (braille pattern dots-12346)	⠎ (braille pattern dots-234)	⠓ (braille pattern dots-125)	⠟ (braille pattern dots-12345)	⠻ (braille pattern dots-12456)	⠷ (braille pattern dots-12356)	⠰ (braille pattern dots-56)

The last two letters, ⠰ ṉ and ⠷ ḻ, are shared with Malayalam, but otherwise ⠰ ṉ is used for the anusvara (nasalization) in other Bharati alphabets, while ⠷ ḻ is also used in Urdu Braille but for the unrelated letter ʻayn.

=== Codas ===
Diacritic	க்	ஃ
Diacritic	Virama	Visarga
Braille	⠈ (braille pattern dots-4)	⠠ (braille pattern dots-6)

== See also ==
- Tamil alphabet
