= Cherusseri Namboothiri =

Indian poet

Cherusseri Namboodiri
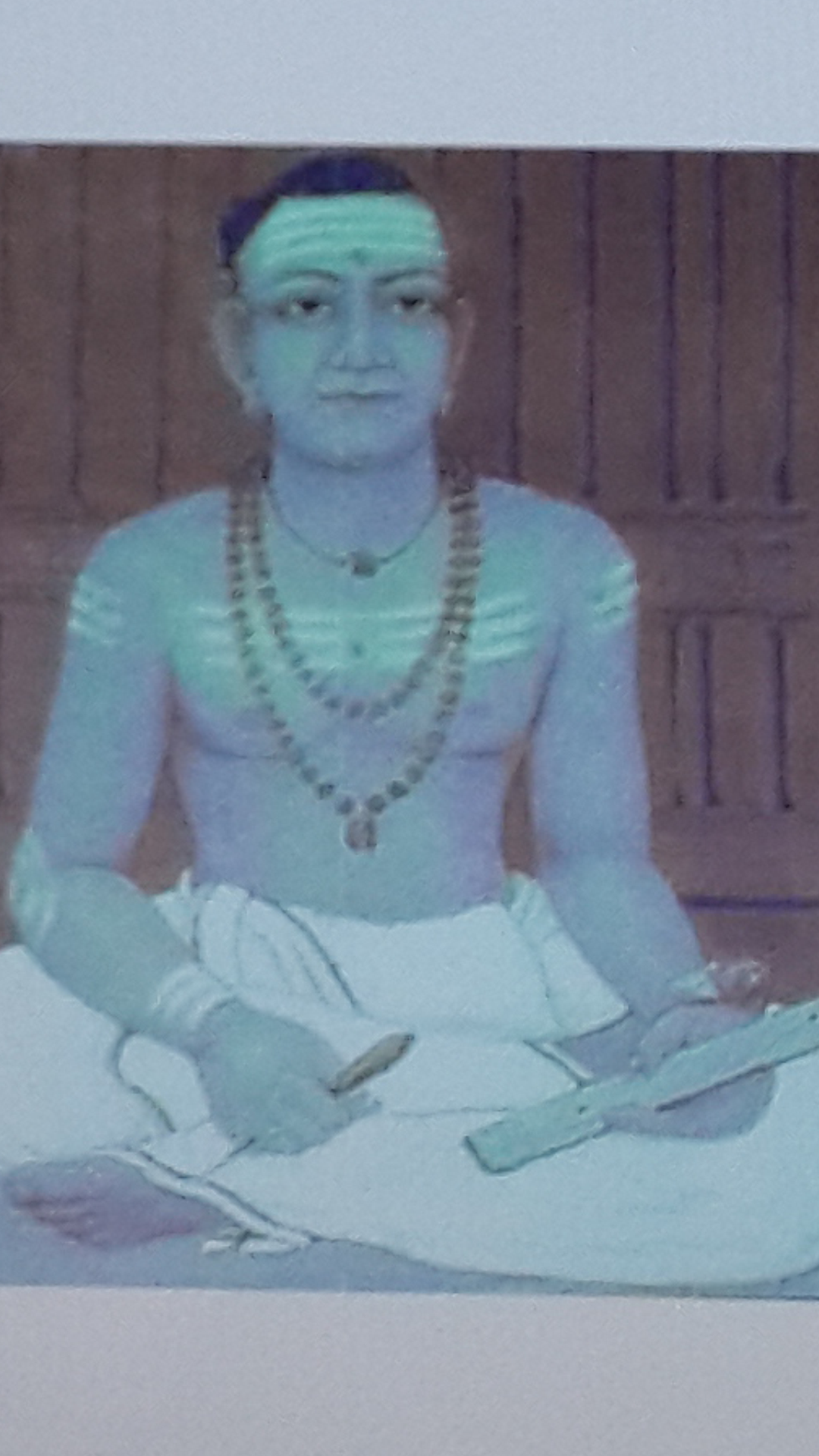
- Born: Cherussheri Neelakandan Nampoothiri c. 1375; Cherussery Illam, Kanathur village, Kolathunadu, (present day, Kerala, India)
- Died: c. 1475
- Resting place: Kozhikode
- Education: Teacher
- Occupation: Poet
- Writing career
- Pen name: Punam Nampoothiri
- Language: Malayalam
- Subject: Poem
- Notable work: Krishna Gadha
- Notable awards: 'Veerasrimkhala'

Cherusseri Namboothiri was a 15th-century Malayalam poet who belonged to Kolathunadu, in present-day North Malabar region of Kerala. He was a court poet of Udaya Varma (1446–1475) and the author of Krishna Gadha, a poem which is considered a landmark in the development of Malayalam literature.

Cherussheri is the illam he was adopted from kanjirangad near the famous Kanjirangad Vaidyanatha Mahadeva Kshetram to vadakara

Neelakandan Nampoothiri is the real authentic name and it was found by Acharyan Vinod in his Travelogue and book about Perinchelloor the name for thaliparamb titled "Perinchelloor Peruma"

Cherusseri Namboothiri is believed to have lived between 1375 and 1475 CE. He was born in Kanathoor village in Kolathunadu or Kolaththiri Desam (now in Vadakara, Kozhikode district, Kerala). Several scholars like P. K. Narayana Pillai and P. Govinda Pillai hold the view that Cherusseri was the name of the Namboothiri's ancestral house (Illam). However, according to T. K. Balakrishnan Nair, there were 12 cheris in Kolathnadu and the smallest of them was called Cheru-Cheri (Cheru-small; Cheri-an extent of a place) which has finally taken the form of Cherusseri. There aren't many details recorded in history about the life of this poet. There is some dispute about the author's name and his identity. Some scholars are of opinion that he was the same as the Punam Namboothiri of the Champu literature. The difference between the style of Krishna Gadha and that of any of the Champus however refutes this argument. A few lines in the opening stanzas of Krishna Gadha clarify that he was a court poet in the palace of the king Udaya Varma, who then ruled Kolathunadu: Malayalam: "Paalaazhi maathuthaan paalichchu porunna Kolathu Nathan Udayavarman Aajnaye cholliyaal ajnanaayullava njaan Praajnaayingane bhaavichchappol" (When the king who rules the Kolath dhesam commands, the ignorant me pretend to be a talented one). Cherusseri's living period has been decided based on the historical record of King Udayavarman's period of reign.

His story about Akruran visiting Ambadi to meet kannan is very famous. His various thoughts Are Portrayed in this story. Krishna Gadha is a long poem of epical dimensions written at the behest of Udaya Varma. It is the first Maha Kavya in Malayalam. Udaya Varma rewarded him with the title Veerasrinkhala and other honors. Cherusseri is the originator of the Gadha style of poetry in Malayalam. Krishna Gadha is the detailed description of the boyhood pranks of Lord Krishna based on the 10th canto of Śrīmad Bhāgavatam, an early Puranic text. Cherusseri's importance lies in his clear inclination towards native tongue, by which his poetry became popular among the people of Kerala. With the writing of Krishna Gadha, the validity of the use of spoken Malayalam for literary purposes received its ultimate justification. Unlike the language of Cheeraman's Ramacharitam and the works of the Niranam poets, the language of Krishna Gadha marks the culmination of a stage of evolution. This work has been respected by the people of Kerala similar to Thunchaththu Ezhuthachan's Adhyathmaramayanam (Ezhuthachan is known as the father of modern Malayalam literature). The legend is that Cherusseri was inspired by a lullaby and followed the same metrical pattern for the composition of Krishna Gadha. It is written in a melodious metre known as manjari.

Krishna Gadha is used in India for daily recitation as an act of worship of Krishna during the Malayalam month Chingam (August–September) by devout Malayali Hindus. The sonorous poetry Krishna Gadha depicts the exploits of Lord Krishna. It is in Krishna Gatha that we see a diction which is similar to that of the present day. The theme deals with the story of Lord Krishna. The sweet and tender aspects of maternal love are wonderfully portrayed in this work. As there are lengthy beautiful descriptions with lavish use of adjectives throughout the poetical work, the composition is quite interesting and enjoyable. Feelings of passion, devotion, humor, and warmth are all discovered at a superior level, singly in a natural style and with equal measure. Other than Krishna Gadha, Bharatha Gadha is also considered to be Cherusseri's composition.
