= Mlecchita vikalpa =

Cryptography in the Indian classic treatise Kamasutra

Mlecchita Vikalpa is one of the 64 arts listed in Vatsyayana's Kamasutra, translated into English as "the art of understanding writing in cypher, and the writing of words in a peculiar way". The list appears in Chapter 3 of Part I of Kamasutra and Mlecchita Vikalpa appears as the 44th item in the list.

== Introduction ==
Mlecchita Vikalpa is the art of secret writing and secret communications. In The Codebreakers, a 1967 book by David Kahn about the history of cryptography, the reference to Mlecchita Vikalpa in Kamasutra is cited as proof of the prevalence of cryptographic methods in ancient India. Though Kamasutra does not have details of the methods by which people of that time practiced this particular form of art, later commentators of Kamasutra have described several methods. For example, Yasodhara in his Jayamangala commentary on Kamasutra gives descriptions of methods known by the names Kautilya and Muladeviya. The ciphers described in the Jayamangala commentary are substitution ciphers: in Kautiliyam the letter substitutions are based on phonetic relations, and Muladeviya is a simplified version of Kautiliyam. There are also references to other methods for secret communications like Gudhayojya, Gudhapada and Gudhavarna. Some modern writers on cryptography have christened the ciphers alluded to in the Kamasutra as Kamasutra cipher or Vatsyayana cipher.

The exact date of the composition of Kamasutra has not been fixed. It is supposed that Vatsyayana must have lived between the first and sixth centuries AD. However, the date of the Jayamangla commentary has been fixed as between the tenth and thirteenth centuries CE.

== Kautiliya ==
This is a Mlecchita named after Kautilya, the author of the ancient Indian political treatise, the Arthashastra. In this system, the short and long vowels, the anusvara and the spirants are interchanged for the consonants and the conjunct consonants. The following table shows the substitutions used in the Kautiliyam cipher. The characters not listed in the table are left unchanged.

a	ā	i	ī	u	ū	ṛ	ṝ	ḷ	ḹ	e	ai	o	au	ṃ	ḩ	ñ	ś	ṣ	s	i	r	l	u
kh	g	gh	ṅ	ch	j	jh	ñ	ṭh	ḍ	ḍh	ṇ	th	d	dh	n	ph	b	bh	m	y	r	l	v

There is a simplified form of this scheme known by the name Durbodha.

== Muladeviya ==
Another form of secret writing mentioned in Yasodhara's commentary on Kamasutra is known by the name Muladeviya. This existed both in the spoken form and in the written form. In the written form it is called Gudhalekhya. This form of secret communications were used by kings' spies as well as traders in various geographical locations in India. Also this form of secret communications has been popular among thieves and robbers. However, there were variations in the actual scheme across the various geographical areas. For example, in the erstwhile Travancore Kingdom, spread over a part of present-day Kerala State in India, it was practiced under the name Mulabhadra with some changes from the schemes described by Yashodhara.

The cipher alphabet of Muladeviya consists of the reciprocal one specified in the table below.

a	kh	gh	c	t	ñ	n	r	l	y
k	g	ṅ	ṭ	p	ṇ	m	ṣ	s	ś

The great Indian epic Mahabharata contains an incident involving the use of this type of secret talking. Duryodhana was planning to burn Pandavas alive and had made arrangements to send Pandavas to Varanavata. Vidura resorted to secret talk to warn Yudhishthira about the dangers in front of everybody present. Only Yudhishthira could understand the secret message. None others even suspected that it was a warning.

== Gudhayojya ==
This is an elementary and trivial method for obscuring the true content of spoken messages and it is popular as a language game among children. The idea is to add some unnecessary letters chosen randomly to the beginning or to the end of every word in a sentence. For example, to obscure the sentence "will visit you tonight" one may add the letters "dis" at the beginning of every word and convey the message as "diswill disvisit disyou distonight" the real content of which may not be intelligible to the uninitiated if pronounced rapidly.

== See also ==
- Mulabhadra
- Pig Latin
