= Malayalam =

Dravidian language

- മലയാളം malayāḷaṁ
- Malayalam in Malayalam script
- Pronunciation: [mɐlɐjaːɭɐm]
- Native to: India
- Region: Southern India: Kerala; Tamil Nadu (Kanyakumari and other Kerala border districts); Puducherry (Mahé); Lakshadweep; Karnataka (Dakshina Kannada and Kodagu districts)
- Ethnicity: Malayali
- Speakers: L1: 37 million (2011); L2: 810,000 (2011); Total: 38 million (2011)
- Language family: Dravidian: Southern; Southern I; Tamil–Kannada; Tamil–Kota; Tamil–Toda; Tamil–Irula; Tamil–Kodava–Urali; Tamil–Malayalam; Malayalamoid; Malayalam
- Early forms: Old Tamil: Middle Tamil; Old Malayalam; Middle Malayalam
- Dialects: Kasaragod; North Malabar; Wayanad; Kozhikode; Eranad; Valluvanad (South Malabar); Palakkad; Thrissur-Kochi; North Travancore; West Vembanad; Central Travancore; South Travancore; Lakshadweep; Ravula; Jeseri; Arabi/Beary; Suriyani; Judeo-Malayalam
- Writing system: Malayalam script (Brahmic); Malayalam Braille; Vatteluttu (historical); Koleluttu (historical); Malayanma (historical); Grantha (historical); Arabi Malayalam script (mostly historical); Suriyani Malayalam (historical); Hebrew script; Latin script (informal)

Official status
- Official language in: India; Kerala; Lakshadweep (additional); Puducherry (Mahé)
- Regulated by: Kerala Sahitya Akademi; Government of Kerala

Language codes
- ISO 639-1: ml
- ISO 639-2: mal
- ISO 639-3: mal
- Glottolog: mala1464
- Linguasphere: 49-EBE-ba
- DarkLight blue = majority or plurality speak Malayalam; LightDark blue = A significant minority speak Malayalam or Malayalam languages are spoken alongside other languages

- Person: Malayāḷi
- People: Malayāḷikaḷ
- Language: Malayāḷam
- Country: Malayāḷa Nāṭu

A Malayalam speaker, recorded in South Africa

Malayalam (മലയാളം, Malayāḷam, [mɐlɐjaːɭɐm]) (Note: English: /ˌmæləˈjɑːləm/) is a Dravidian language, primarily spoken by the Malayali people, native to the Indian state of Keralam and the union territories of Lakshadweep and Puducherry (Mahé district). It is one of 22 scheduled languages, as well as one of 11 classical languages, of India. Malayalam has official language status in Kerala, Lakshadweep and Puducherry (Mahé).

Malayalam is spoken by significant numbers of people in India and is the majority language in the state of Kerala. Malayalam is also spoken by linguistic minorities in the neighbouring states; with a significant number of speakers in the Kodagu and Dakshina Kannada districts of Karnataka, and Kanyakumari, Coimbatore and Nilgiris district of Tamil Nadu. It is also spoken by the Malayali Diaspora worldwide, especially in the Persian Gulf countries, due to the large populations of Malayali expatriates there. They are a significant population in each city in India including Mumbai, Bengaluru, Chennai, Delhi, Hyderabad etc.

The origin of Malayalam remains a matter of dispute among scholars. The mainstream view holds that Malayalam descends from a western coastal dialect of early Middle Tamil and separated from it sometime between the 9th and 13th centuries though the spoken dialect of this period likely also preserved some archaisms suggesting an earlier divergence of the spoken dialects in the prehistoric period. A second view argues for the development of the two languages out of "Proto-Dravidian" or "Proto-Tamil-Malayalam" either in the prehistoric period or in the middle of the first millennium A.D., although this is generally rejected by historical linguists. The earliest extant inscription that appear in Kerala Quilon Syrian copper plates of 849/850 CE are considered by some to be the oldest available inscription written in Old Malayalam. However, the existence of Old Malayalam is sometimes disputed by scholars. They regard the Chera Perumal inscriptional language as a diverging dialect or variety of contemporary Tamil. The oldest extant literary work in Malayalam distinct from the Tamil tradition is Ramacharitam (late 12th or early 13th century).

The earliest script used to write Malayalam was the Vatteluttu script. The current Malayalam script is based on the Vatteluttu script, which was extended with Grantha script letters to adopt Indo-Aryan loanwords. It bears high similarity with the Tigalari script, a historical script that was used to write the Tulu language in South Canara, and Sanskrit in the adjacent Malabar region. The modern Malayalam grammar is based on the book Kerala Panineeyam written by A. R. Raja Raja Varma in late 19th century CE. The first travelogue in any Indian language is the Malayalam Varthamanappusthakam, written by Paremmakkal Thoma Kathanar in 1785.

Robert Caldwell describes the extent of Malayalam in the 19th century as extending from the vicinity of Kumbla in the north where it supersedes with Tulu to Kanyakumari in the south, where it begins to be superseded by Tamil, beside the inhabited islands of Lakshadweep in the Arabian Sea.

== Etymology ==
In a 7th-century poem written by the Tamil poet Sambandar the people of Kerala are referred to as malaiyāḷar (mountain people). The word Malayalam is also said to originate from the words mala, meaning 'mountain', and alam, meaning 'region' or '-ship' (as in "township"); Malayalam thus translates directly as 'the mountain region'. The term Malabar was used as an alternative term for Malayalam in foreign trade circles to denote the southwestern coast of the Indian peninsula, which also means The land of hills. The term originally referred to the western hilly land of the Chera dynasty (later Zamorins and the Kingdom of Cochin), Kingdom of Ezhimala (later Kolathunadu), and Ay kingdom (later Travancore), and only later became the name of its language. The language Malayalam was alternatively called Alealum, Malayalani, Malayali, Malabari, Malean, Maliyad, Mallealle, and Kerala Bhasha until the early 19th century CE.

The earliest extant literary works in the regional language of present-day Kerala probably date back to as early as the 12th century. At that time, the language was differentiated by the name Kerala Bhasha. The earliest mention of Malayalam as a language is found outside of Kerala in the 15th century Telugu work Śrībhīmēśvarapurāṇamu by Śrīnātha. The distinctive "Malayalam" named identity of this language appears to have come into existence in Kerala only around this time, when it was known as "Malayayma" or "Malayanma"; the words were also used to refer to the script and the region. According to Duarte Barbosa, a Portuguese visitor who visited Kerala in the early 16th century CE, the people in the southwestern Malabar coast of India from Kumbla in north to Kanyakumari in south had a unique language, which was called "Maliama" by them.

Before this period, although the term "malayali" does occur referring to the inhabitants of Kerala (its difficult to infer whether this term similarly designated a unified speech-community), people of Kerala usually referred to their language as "Tamil", and both terms overlapped into the colonial period. (Note: "Prior to this relatively modern coining of "Malayalam", the identity is even more fraught, for Kerala folk more usually referred to their language as "Tamil", just as those in the dominant kingdoms of Tamilnadu, east of the Western Ghats, had from the early centuries C.E. Use of the label "Tamil" continued to overlap with that of "Malayalam" into the colonial period".)

== History ==
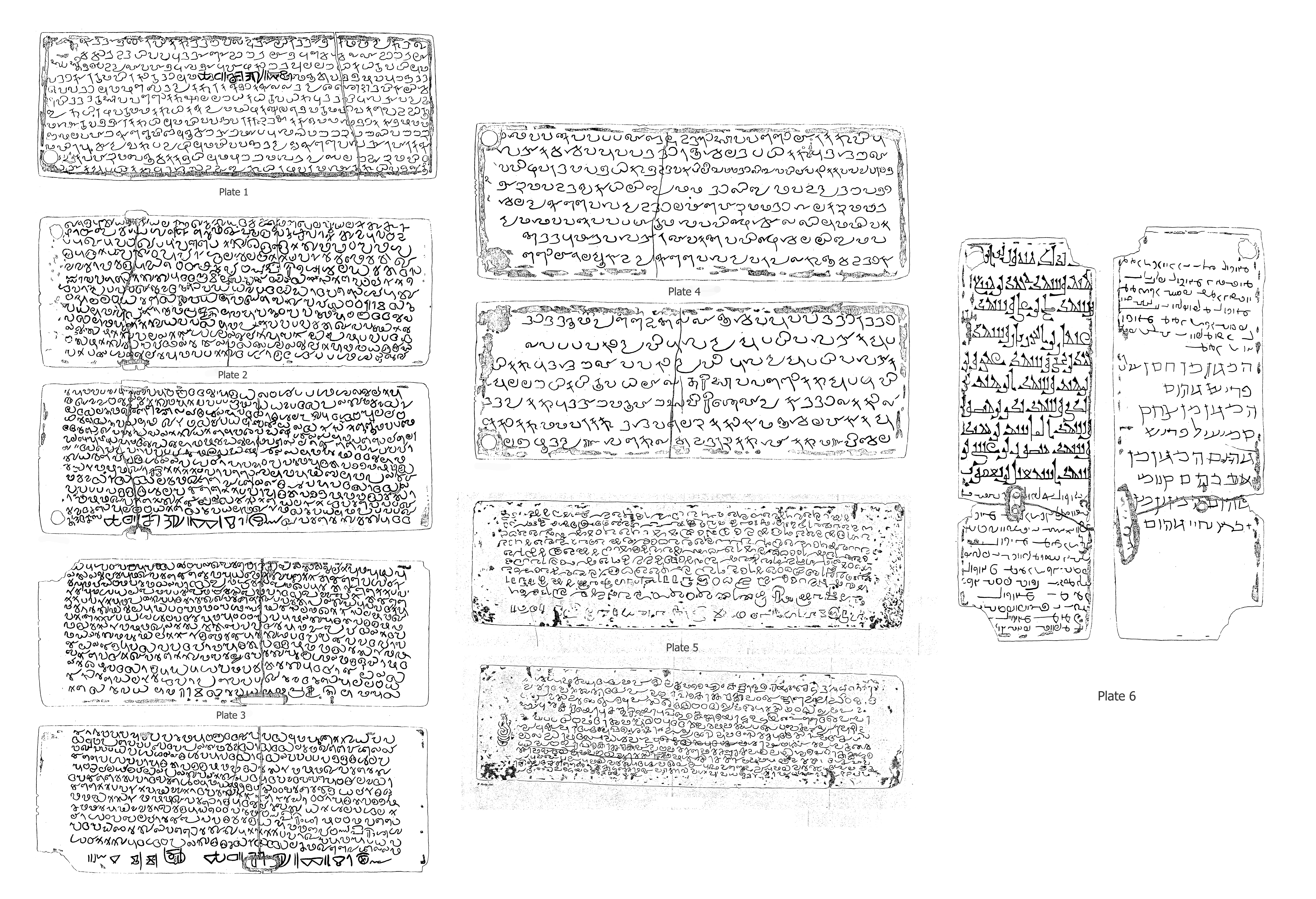
The Quilon Syrian copper plates (849/850 CE) are considered as the oldest available inscription written in Old Malayalam. Besides Old Malayalam, the copper plate also contains signatures in Arabic (Kufic script), Middle Persian (cursive Pahlavi script) and Judeo-Persian (standard square Hebrew) scripts.

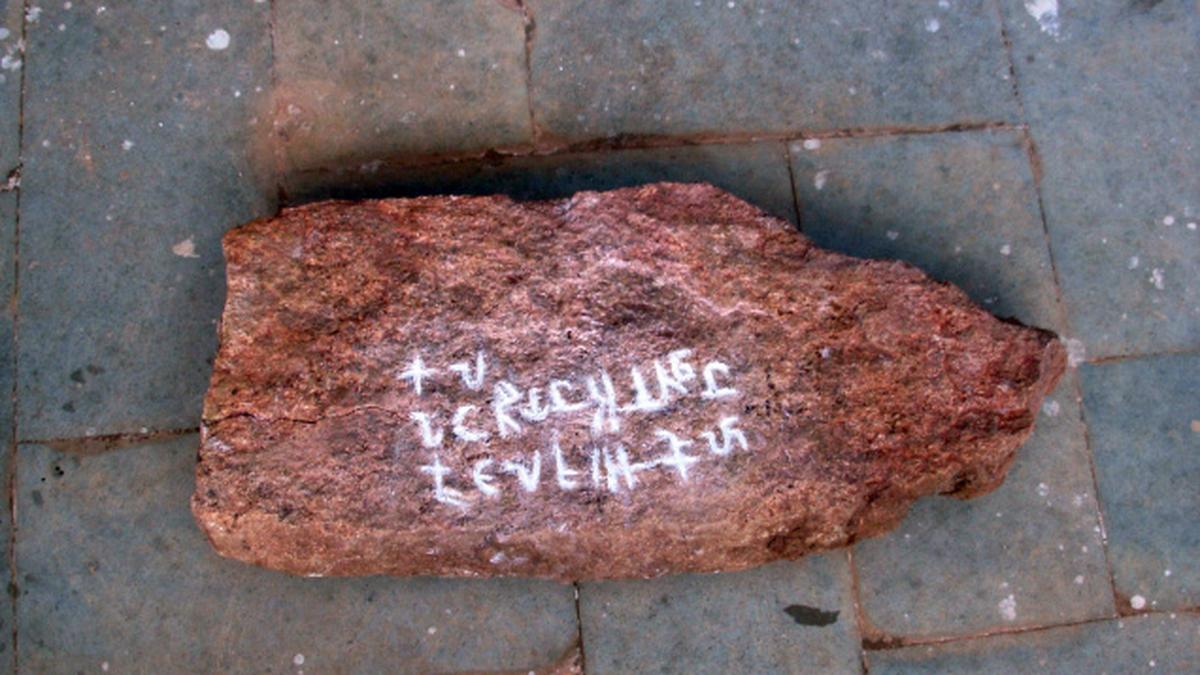
Veerakkal Tamil-Brahmi inscription (ca. 2nd cent. BCE) from Pulimaankombai, raised in memory of tīyaṉ antavaṉ, who died in a cattle raid in a village called kūṭal ūr. The words 'peṭu' and 'tīyaṉ' are regarded by Iravatham Mahadevan as pre-Malayalam terms, with "tīyaṉ" (thiyyar) being the name for a caste from Kerala. The inscription contributed to Malayalam being granted classical language status by the Government of India, a status which is granted to languages deemed older than 2,000 years by the "Linguistic Expert Committee."

Due to the geographical isolation of the Malabar Coast from the rest of the Indian peninsula due to the presence of the Western Ghats mountain ranges which lie parallel to the coast, the dialect of Old Tamil spoken in Kerala was different from that spoken in Tamil Nadu. The mainstream view holds that Malayalam began to grow as a distinct literary language from the western coastal dialect of Middle Tamil and separated from Proto-Tamil-Malayalam sometime between the 9th and 13th centuries. The renowned poets of Classical Tamil such as Paranar (1st century CE), Ilango Adigal (2nd–3rd century CE), and Kulasekhara Alvar (9th century CE) were Keralites. The Sangam works can be considered as the ancient predecessor of Malayalam.

However Govindankutty argues that both Tamil and Malayalam was developed during the prehistoric period from a common ancestor, "Proto-Tamil-Malayalam", and that the notion of Malayalam being a "daughter" of Tamil is misplaced. This is based on the fact that Malayalam and several Dravidian languages on the Western Coast have common archaic features which are not found even in the oldest historical forms of literary Tamil. Despite this, Malayalam shares many common innovations with Tamil that emerged during the early Middle Tamil period, thus making independent descent untenable. (Note: Linguist K.M Prabhakar Variar further adds: "It is an accepted principle in comparative linguistics that 'innovations' rather than 'retentions' or 'losses' are to be relied on for sub-grouping of genetically related language. Every member of a language family has a stock of 'retentions of a few proto-features' together with a stock 'innovations'. It is the later that would show the relative distances among the member languages. Therefore, retention of a few proto-features in a particular language does not prove the earlier branching of the same from the proto-language. Malayalam, of course, has retained certain phonological and morphological features which can be reconstructed as belonging to the Proto-Dravidian and which have been lost or have suffered shape changes in the other member-languages. Which language in the Dravidian family doesn't have such retentions? Has anyone measured the relative percentages of retentions of archaic features in the twenty and odd Dravidian languages?".) Indeed, most features of Malayalam morphology are derivable from a form of speech corresponding to early Middle Tamil. S.V. Shanmugam, emphasizing the close connection of Malayalam with Early middle tamil while also recognizing the archaisms present in malayalam and independent innovations that likely happened in its prehistoric period, states that the pre-history of Malayalam or the position of Malayalam in Dravidian cannot be explained in a simple and straightforward manner.

Robert Caldwell, in his 1856 book "A Comparative Grammar of the Dravidian or South-Indian Family of Languages", opined that literary Malayalam branched from Classical Tamil and over time gained a large amount of Sanskrit vocabulary and lost the personal terminations of verbs. As the language of scholarship and administration, Old-Tamil, which was written in Tamil-Brahmi and the Vatteluttu alphabet later, greatly influenced the early development of Malayalam as a literary language. The Malayalam script began to diverge from the Vatteluttu and the Western Grantha scripts in the 8th and 9th centuries of Common Era. By the end of the 13th century, a written form of the language emerged which was unique from the Vatteluttu script that was used to write Tamil on the eastern coast.

=== Old Malayalam ===
Old Malayalam (Paḻaya Malayāḷam), an inscriptional language found in Kerala from the 9th to the 13th century CE, is the earliest attested form of Malayalam. The development of Old Malayalam from a western coastal dialect of Middle Tamil began around the 8th century CE. It remained a west coast dialect until circa 9th century CE or a little later. The origin of Malayalam calendar dates back to year 825 CE. It is generally agreed that the western coastal dialect of Tamil began to separate, diverge, and grow as a distinct language due to geographical separation of Kerala from the Tamil country and the influence of Sanskrit and Prakrit from the Nambudiri Brahmins of the Malabar Coast, although the spoken dialect itself likely also preserved several archaic features suggesting an earlier divergence of the spoken dialects in the prehistoric period.

The Old Malayalam language was employed in several official records and transactions (at the level of the Chera Perumal kings, as well as the upper-caste (Nambudiri) village temples). Most of the inscriptions in Old Malayalam were found from the northern districts of Kerala, which lie adjacent to Tulu Nadu. Old Malayalam was mostly written in Vatteluttu script (with Pallava/Southern Grantha characters). Old Malayalam had several features distinct from the contemporary Tamil, including the nasalisation of adjoining sounds, substitution of palatal sounds for dental sounds, contraction of vowels, and the rejection of gender verbs. Ramacharitam and Thirunizhalmala are the possible literary works of Old Malayalam found so far. Some authors consider Old Malayalam inscriptional language to be rather a variety of tamil.

=== Middle Malayalam ===
Old Malayalam gradually developed into Middle Malayalam (Madhyakaala Malayalam) by the 13th century CE. Malayalam literature also completely diverged from Tamil literature during this period. Works including Unniyachi Charitham, Unnichiruthevi Charitham, and Unniyadi Charitham, are written in Middle Malayalam, and date back to the 13th and 14th centuries of the Common Era. The Sandesha Kavyas of 14th century CE written in Manipravalam language include Unnuneeli Sandesam. Kannassa Ramayanam and Kannassa Bharatham by Rama Panikkar of the Niranam poets who lived between 1350 and 1450, are representative of this language. Ulloor has opined that Rama Panikkar holds the same position in Malayalam literature that Edmund Spenser does in English literature. The Champu Kavyas written by Punam Nambudiri, one among the Pathinettara Kavikal (Eighteen and a half poets) in the court of the Zamorin of Calicut, also belong to Middle Malayalam. The literary works of this period were heavily influenced by Manipravalam, which was a combination of contemporary Tamil and Sanskrit. The word Mani-Pravalam literally means Diamond-Coral or Ruby-Coral. The 14-16th century text Lilatilakam states Manipravalam to be a Bhashya (language) where "Dravida and Sanskrit should combine like ruby and coral, without the least trace of any discord". The scripts of Kolezhuthu and Malayanma were also used to write Middle Malayalam. In addition to Vatteluthu and Grantha script, those were used to write Old Malayalam. The literary works written in Middle Malayalam were heavily influenced by Sanskrit and Prakrit, while comparing them with the modern Malayalam literature.

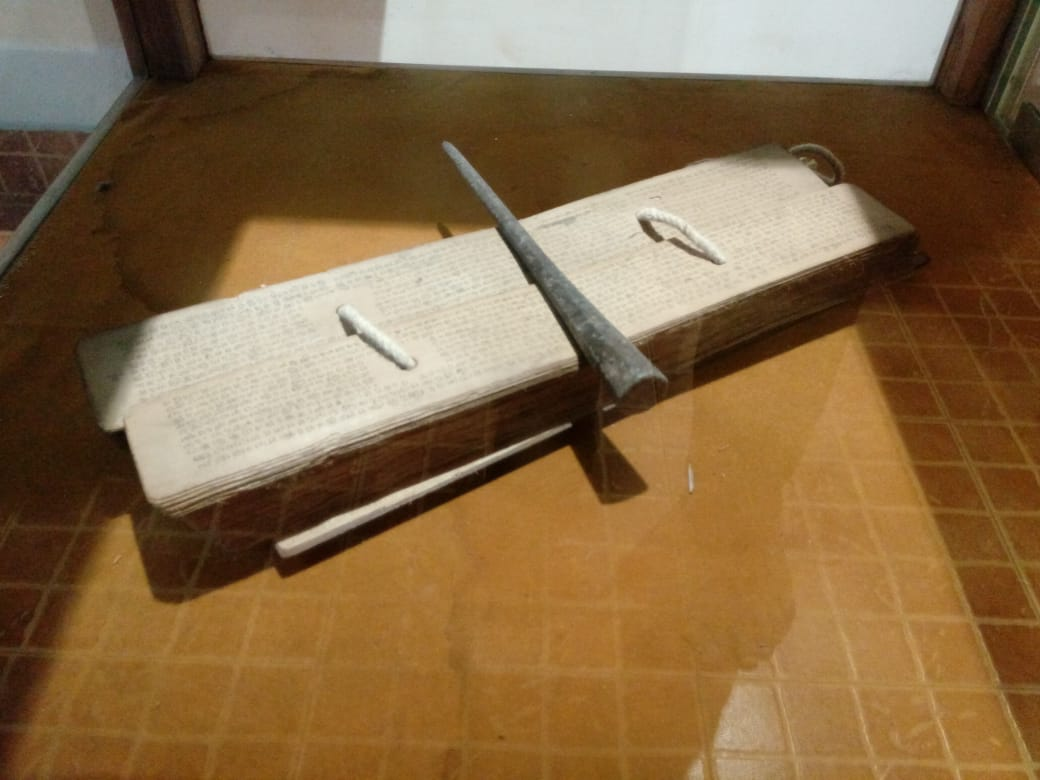
Copy of Ezhuthachan's stylus and Adhyatma Ramayanam preserved at Thunchan Parambu, Tirur

=== Modern Malayalam ===
The Middle Malayalam was succeeded by Modern Malayalam (Aadhunika Malayalam) by 15th century CE. The poem Krishnagatha written by Cherusseri Namboothiri, who was the court poet of the king Udaya Varman Kolathiri (1446–1475) of Kolathunadu, is written in modern Malayalam. The language used in Krishnagatha is the modern spoken form of Malayalam. During the 16th century CE, Thunchaththu Ezhuthachan from the Kingdom of Tanur and Poonthanam Nambudiri from the Kingdom of Valluvanad, followed the new trend initiated by Cherussery in their poems. The Adhyathmaramayanam Kilippattu and Mahabharatham Kilippattu, written by Ezhuthachan, and Jnanappana, written by Poonthanam, are also included in the earliest form of Modern Malayalam.

Comparison of Grantha, Tigalari, and Malayalam scripts
	Letter				
Script	ka	kha	ga	gha	ṅa
Malayalam	ക	ഖ	ഗ	ഘ	ങ
Grantha	𑌕	𑌖	𑌗	𑌘	𑌙
Tigalari	𑎒	𑎓	𑎔	𑎕	𑎖
Tamil	க				ங
Sinhala	ක්	ඛ	ග	ඝ	ණ
Kannada	ಕ	ಖ	ಗ	ಘ	ಙ

Thunchaththu Ezhuthachan is also credited with developing the Malayalam script into the current form through the intermixing and modification of the erstwhile scripts of Vatteluttu, Kolezhuthu, and Grantha script, which were used to write the inscriptions and literary works of Old and Middle Malayalam. He further eliminated excess and unnecessary letters from the modified script. Hence, Ezhuthachan is also known as The Father of modern Malayalam. The development of modern Malayalam script was also heavily influenced by the Tigalari script, which was used to write Sanskrit, due to the influence of Tuluva Brahmins in Kerala. The language used in the Arabi Malayalam works of the 16th–17th century CE is a mixture of Modern Malayalam and Arabic. They follow the syntax of modern Malayalam, though written in a modified form of Arabic script, which is known as Arabi Malayalam script. P. Shangunny Menon ascribes the authorship of the medieval work Keralolpathi, which describes the Parashurama legend and the departure of the final Cheraman Perumal king to Mecca, to Thunchaththu Ramanujan Ezhuthachan.

Kunchan Nambiar introduced a new literary form called Thullal, and Unnayi Variyar introduced reforms in Attakkatha literature. The printing, prose literature, and Malayalam journalism, developed after the latter-half of the 18th century CE. Modern literary movements in Malayalam literature began in the late 19th century with the rise of the famous Modern Triumvirate consisting of Kumaran Asan, Ulloor S. Parameswara Iyer and Vallathol Narayana Menon. In the second half of the 20th century, Jnanpith winning poets and writers like G. Sankara Kurup, S. K. Pottekkatt, Thakazhi Sivasankara Pillai, M. T. Vasudevan Nair, O. N. V. Kurup, and Akkitham Achuthan Namboothiri, had made valuable contributions to the modern Malayalam literature. The life and works of Edasseri Govindan Nair have assumed greater socio-literary significance after his death and Edasseri is now recognised as an important poet of Malayalam. Later, writers like O. V. Vijayan, Kamaladas, M. Mukundan, Arundhati Roy, and Vaikom Muhammed Basheer, have gained international recognition. Malayalam has also borrowed a lot of its words from various foreign languages: mainly from the Semitic languages including Arabic, and the European languages including Dutch and Portuguese, due to the long heritage of Indian Ocean trade and the Portuguese-Dutch colonization of the Malabar Coast.

Malayalam is taught in public schools of Kerala, Lakshadweep and Puducherry (Mahé) (India).The language is also taught in Indian schools in the Middle East.

== Dialects ==
Variations in intonation patterns, vocabulary, and distribution of grammatical and phonological elements are observable along the parameters of region, religion, community, occupation, social stratum, style and register.

According to the Dravidian Encyclopedia, the regional dialects of Malayalam can be divided into fifteen dialect areas. They are as follows:

- Kasaragod
- North Malabar
- Wayanad
- Kozhikode
- Eranad
- Valluvanad (South Malabar)
- Palakkad
- Thrissur-Kochi
- North Travancore
- West Vembanad
- Central Travancore
- South Travancore
- Lakshadweep
- Beary
- Ravula

According to Ethnologue, the dialects are: Malabar, Nagari-Malayalam, North Kerala, Central Kerala, South Kerala, Kayavar, Namboodiri, Nair, Mappila, Beary, Jeseri, Yerava, Pulaya, Nasrani, and Kasargod. The community dialects are: Namboodiri, Nair, Arabi Malayalam, Pulaya, and Nasrani. Whereas both the Namboothiri and Nair dialects have a common nature, Arabi Malayalam is among the most divergent of dialects, differing considerably from literary Malayalam. Jeseri is a dialect of Malayalam spoken mainly in the Union territory of Lakshadweep and Beary is spoken in Tulu Nadu which are nearer to Kerala. Of the total 33,066,392 Malayalam speakers in India in 2001, 33,015,420 spoke the standard dialects, 19,643 spoke the Yerava dialect and 31,329 spoke non-standard regional variations like Eranadan.

The dialects of Malayalam spoken in the districts like Kasaragod, Kannur, Wayanad, Kozhikode, and Malappuram in the former Malabar District have few influences from Kannada. For example, the words those start with the sound "V" in Malayalam become "B" in these districts as in Kannada. Also the Voiced retroflex approximant (/ɻ/) which is seen in both Tamil and the standard form of Malayalam, are not seen in the northern dialects of Malayalam, as in Kannada. For example, the words Vazhi (Path), Vili (Call), Vere (Another), and Vaa (Come/Mouth), become Bayi, Bili, Bere, and Baa in the northern dialects of Malayalam. Similarly the Malayalam spoken in the southern districts of Kerala, i.e., Thiruvananthapuram-Kollam-Pathanamthitta area is influenced by Tamil.

Labels such as "Nampoothiri Dialect", "Mappila Dialect", and "Nasrani Dialect" refer to overall patterns constituted by the sub-dialects spoken by the subcastes or subgroups of each such caste. The most outstanding features of the major communal dialects of Malayalam are summarized below:

- Lexical items with phonological features reminiscent of Sanskrit (e.g., viddhi meaning 'fool'), bhosku 'lie', musku 'impudence', dustu 'impurity', and eebhyan and sumbhan (both meaning 'good-for-nothing fellow') abound in the Nampoothiri dialect.
- The Muslim dialect, also known as Arabi Malayalam, shows maximum divergence from the literary Standard Dialect of Malayalam. It is very much influenced by Arabic and Persian rather than by Sanskrit or by English. The retroflex continuant zha of the literary dialect is realised in the Muslim dialect as the palatal ya. In some other dialects of Northern Kerala too, zha of the literary dialect is realised as ya.
- The Syrian Christian or Nasrani dialect of Malayalam is quite close to the Nair dialect, especially in phonology. The speech of the educated section among Syrian Christians and that of those who are close to the church are peculiar in having a number of assimilated as well as unassimilated loan words from English and Syriac. The few loan words which have found their way into the Christian dialect are assimilated in many cases through the process of de-aspiration.
- The Ravula is a tribal dialect of Malayalam spoken by the members of Ravula, an indigenous people's tribe who are primarily inhabitants of the Kodagu district of Karnataka.
- Tamil spoken in the Kanyakumari district has influences from the Malayalam language.

=== External influences and loanwords ===
Malayalam has incorporated many elements from other languages over the years, the most notable of these being Sanskrit and later, English. According to Sooranad Kunjan Pillai who compiled the authoritative Malayalam lexicon, the other principal languages whose vocabulary was incorporated over the ages were Arabic, Dutch, Hindustani, Pali, Persian, Portuguese, Prakrit, and Syriac.

- Many medieval liturgical texts were written in an admixture of Sanskrit and early Malayalam, called Manipravalam. The influence of Sanskrit was very prominent in formal Malayalam used in the medieval literature. Malayalam has a substantially high number of Sanskrit loanwords but these are seldom used.
- Some Arabic loanwords like adālattŭ (court of justice), jāmyaṃ (bail), japti (foreclosure), jilla (district), tālukkŭ (subdistrict), etc., are used in the formal literary Malayalam for administrative purposes.
- Loanwords and influences also from Hebrew, Syriac, and Ladino abound in the Jewish Malayalam dialects, as well as English, Portuguese, Syriac, and Greek in the Christian dialects, while Arabic and Persian elements predominate in the Muslim dialects.
- The Muslim dialect known as Mappila Malayalam is predominantly in the northern districts of Kerala. Another Muslim dialect called Beary bashe is used in the extreme northern part of Kerala along with the southern part of Karnataka in a former region called Tulu Nadu.

Examples of vocabulary from various origins
Malayalam word	Source

== Geographic distribution and population ==
State/Union Territory	Malayalam speakers 2011	Proportion
Kerala	32,413,213	97.03%
Lakshadweep	54,264	84.17%
Andaman and Nicobar Islands	27,475	7.22%
Puducherry	47,973	3.84%
Karnataka	7,74,057	2.22%
Tamil Nadu	7,26,096	2.08%
India	34,838,819	2.88%

Malayalam is a language spoken by the native people of southwestern India and the islands of Lakshadweep in the Arabian Sea. According to the Indian census of 2011, there were 32,413,213 speakers of Malayalam in Kerala, making up 93.2% of the total number of Malayalam speakers in India, and 97.03% of the total population of the state. There were a further 7,74,057 (2.22% of the total number) in Karnataka, 7,26,096 (2.05%) in Tamil Nadu, and 406,358 (1.2%) in Maharashtra.

The number of Malayalam speakers in Lakshadweep is 51,100, which is only 0.15% of the total number, but is as much as about 84% of the population of Lakshadweep. Malayalam was the most spoken language in the erstwhile Gudalur taluk (now Gudalur and Panthalur taluks) of Nilgiris district in Tamil Nadu which accounts for 48.8% population and it was the second most spoken language in Mangaluru and Puttur taluks of South Canara accounting for 21.2% and 15.4% respectively according to 1951 census report. 25.57% of the total population in the Kodagu district of Karnataka are Malayalis, and they form the single largest linguistic group accounting for 35.5% in the Virajpet Taluk. Around one-third of the Malayalis in Kodagu district speak the Yerava dialect according to the 2011 census, which is native to Kodagu and Wayanad.

In all, Malayalis made up 3.22% of the total Indian population in 2011. Of the total 34,713,130 Malayalam speakers in India in 2011, 33,015,420 spoke the standard dialects, 19,643 spoke the Yerava dialect and 31,329 spoke non-standard regional variations like Eranadan. As per the 1991 census data, 28.85% of all Malayalam speakers in India spoke a second language and 19.64% of the total knew three or more languages.

Just before independence, Malaya attracted many Malayalis. Large numbers of Malayalis have settled in Chennai, Bengaluru, Mangaluru, Hyderabad, Mumbai, Navi Mumbai, Pune, Mysuru and Delhi. Many Malayalis have also emigrated to the Middle East, the United States, and Europe. There were 179,860 speakers of Malayalam in the United States, according to the 2000 census, with the highest concentrations in Bergen County, New Jersey, and Rockland County, New York. There are 144,000 Malayalam speakers in Malaysia. There were 11,687 Malayalam speakers in Australia in 2016. The 2001 Canadian census reported 7,070 people who listed Malayalam as their mother tongue, mainly in Toronto. The 2006 New Zealand census reported 2,139 speakers. 134 Malayalam speaking households were reported in 1956 in Fiji. There is also a considerable Malayali population in the Persian Gulf regions, especially in Dubai, Kuwait and Doha.

== Phonology ==
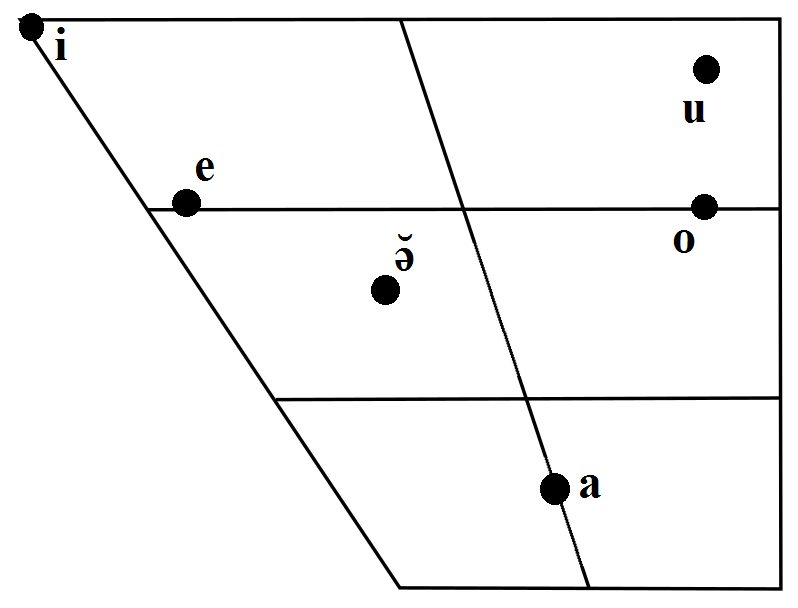
Monophthongs of the Namboodiri dialect of Malayalam, from Namboodiripad (2016)

Literary Malayalam

For the consonants and vowels, the International Phonetic Alphabet (IPA) symbol is given, followed by the Malayalam character and the ISO 15919 transliteration.

=== Vowels ===
The first letter in Malayalam

	Short			Long		
	Front	Central	Back	Front	Central	Back
Close	/i/ ഇ i		/u/ ഉ u	/iː/ ഈ ī		/uː/ ഊ ū
Mid	/e/എ e	/ə̆/ ് ŭ	/o/ ഒ o	/eː/ ഏ ē		/oː/ ഓ ō
Open		/a/ അ a			/aː/ ആ ā	

=== Consonants ===
		Labial	Dental	Alveolar	Retroflex	Postalveolar/ Palatal	Velar	Glottal
Nasal		m മ ⟨m⟩	n̪ ന ⟨n⟩	n ന / ഩ (Note: Obsolete) ⟨ṉ⟩	ɳ ണ ⟨ṇ⟩	ɲ ഞ ⟨ñ⟩	ŋ, (ŋʲ) ങ ⟨ṅ⟩	
Plosive/ Affricate	voiceless	p പ ⟨p⟩	t̪ ത ⟨t⟩	t റ്റ ⟨ṟṟ⟩	ʈ ട ⟨ṭ⟩	t͡ɕ~t͡ʃ ച ⟨c⟩	k, (kʲ) ക ⟨k⟩	
Plosive/ Affricate	aspirated	pʰ ഫ ⟨ph⟩	t̪ʰ ഥ ⟨th⟩		ʈʰ ഠ ⟨ṭh⟩	t͡ɕʰ~t͡ʃʰ ഛ ⟨ch⟩	kʰ ഖ ⟨kh⟩	
Plosive/ Affricate	voiced	b ബ ⟨b⟩	d̪ ദ ⟨d⟩	(d) (Note: Only occurs after ṉ.) ന്റ ⟨nṟ⟩	ɖ ഡ ⟨ḍ⟩	d͡ʑ~d͡ʒ ജ ⟨j⟩	ɡ ഗ ⟨g⟩	
Plosive/ Affricate	breathy	bʱ ഭ ⟨bh⟩	d̪ʱ ധ ⟨dh⟩		ɖʱ ഢ ⟨ḍh⟩	d͡ʑʱ~d͡ʒʱ ഝ ⟨jh⟩	ɡʱ ഘ ⟨gh⟩	
Fricative		f ഫ ⟨f⟩		s, (z) സ ⟨s⟩	ʂ ഷ ⟨ṣ⟩	ɕ~ʃ ശ ⟨ś⟩		h ഹ ⟨h⟩
Approx.	central	ʋ വ ⟨v⟩			ɻ ഴ ⟨ḻ⟩ (Note: Often transliterated as zh by Malayalis and Tamils, may also be transliterated as ẓ or r̤ by some others.)	j യ ⟨y⟩		
Approx.	lateral			l ല ⟨l⟩	ɭ ള ⟨ḷ⟩			
Tap				ɾ ര ⟨r⟩				
Trill				r റ ⟨ṟ⟩				

== Sample text ==
The following text is Article 1 of the Universal Declaration of Human Rights.

=== English ===
All human beings are born free and equal in dignity and rights. They are endowed with reason and conscience and should act towards one another in a spirit of brotherhood.

=== Malayalam ===
മനുഷ്യരെല്ലാവരും തുല്യാവകാശങ്ങളോടും അന്തസ്സോടും സ്വാതന്ത്ര്യത്തോടുംകൂടി ജനിച്ചിട്ടുള്ളവരാണ്‌. അന്യോന്യം ഭ്രാതൃഭാവത്തോടെ പെരുമാറുവാനാണ്‌ മനുഷ്യന് വിവേകബുദ്ധിയും മനസാക്ഷിയും സിദ്ധമായിരിക്കുന്നത്‌.

=== Romanisation (ISO 15919) ===
manuṣyarellāvaruṁ tulyāvakāśaṅṅaḷōṭuṁ antassōṭuṁ svātantryattōṭuṅkūṭi janicciṭṭuḷḷavarāṇŭ. anyōnyaṁ bhrātr̥bhāvattōṭe perumāṟuvānāṇŭ manuṣyanŭ vivēkabuddhiyuṁ manasākṣiyuṁ siddhamāyirikkunnatŭ.

=== IPA ===
[/manuʂjaɾellaːʋaɾum t̪uljaːʋakaːʃaŋŋaɭoːʈum an̪t̪assoːʈum sʋaːt̪an̪t̪rjat̪t̪oːʈuŋkuːʈi d͡ʒanit͡ʃt͡ʃiʈʈuɭɭaʋaɾaːɳɨ̆ ǁ anjoːnjam bʱraːt̪rɨ̆bʱaːʋat̪t̪oːʈe peɾumaːruʋaːnaːɳɨ̆ manuʂjanɨ̆ ʋiʋeːkabud̪d̪ʱijum manasaːkʂijum sid̪d̪ʱamaːjiɾikkun̪ːat̪ɨ̆ ǁ/]

== Grammar ==
Malayalam has a canonical word order of SOV (subject–object–verb), as do other Dravidian languages. A rare OSV word order occurs in interrogative clauses when the interrogative word is the subject. Both adjectives and possessive adjectives precede the nouns they modify. Malayalam has 6 or 7 grammatical cases. Verbs are conjugated for tense, mood and aspect, but not for person, gender nor number except in archaic or poetic language. The modern Malayalam grammar is based on the book Kerala Panineeyam written by A. R. Raja Raja Varma in late 19th century CE.

=== Nouns ===
The declensional paradigms for some common nouns and pronouns are given below. As Malayalam is an agglutinative language, it is difficult to delineate the cases strictly and determine how many there are, although seven or eight is the generally accepted number. Alveolar plosives and nasals (although the modern Malayalam script does not distinguish the latter from the dental nasal) are underlined for clarity, following the convention of the National Library at Kolkata romanization.

=== Personal pronouns ===
Vocative forms are given in parentheses after the nominative, as the only pronominal vocatives that are used are the third person ones, which only occur in compounds.

Singular
Case വിഭക്തി	1st person	2nd person informal (Note: 2nd person singular formal is similar to 2nd person plural.)	3rd person (distal) (Note: For proximal form, replace the initial 'a' with an 'i'.)		
Case വിഭക്തി	1st person	2nd person informal	masculine	feminine	neutral
Nominative സംബോധന	ñāṉ	nī	avaṉ (voc. avaṉē)	avaḷ (voc. avaḷē)	adŭ (voc. athinē)
Accusative പ്രതിഗ്രാഹിക	eṉṉe	niṉṉe	avaṉe	avaḷe	atiṉe
Genitive സംബന്ധിക	eṉte (also eṉ, eṉṉute)	niṉte (also niṉ, niṉṉute)	avaṉte (also avaṉute)	avaḷute	atiṉte
Dative ഉദ്ദേശിക	eṉikkŭ	niṉakkŭ	avaṉŭ	avaḷkkŭ	atiṉŭ
Instrumental പ്രായോജിക	eṉṉāl	niṉṉāl	avaṉāl	avaḷāl	atiṉāl
Locative ആധാരിക	eṉṉil	niṉṉil	avaṉil	avaḷil	atil
Sociative സംയോജിക	eṉṉōḍŭ	niṉṉōḍŭ	avaṉōḍŭ	avaḷōḍŭ	adinōḍŭ
Notes:

Plural
Case വിഭക്തി	1st person		2nd person	3rd person
Case വിഭക്തി	exclusive	inclusive	2nd person	3rd person
Nominative സംബോധന	ñaṅṅaḷ	nām/ nammaḷ	niṅṅaḷ	avar̠ (voc. avarē)
Accusative പ്രതിഗ്രാഹിക	ñaṅṅaḷe	nammaḷe	niṅṅaḷe	avare
Genitive സംബന്ധിക	ñaṅṅaḷuḍe (also ñaṅṅuḍe)	nammuḍe	niṅṅaḷuḍe	avaruḍe
Dative ഉദ്ദേശിക	ñaṅṅaḷkkŭ	nammaḷkkŭ (also namukkŭ)	niṅṅaḷkkŭ	avar̠kkŭ
Instrumental പ്രായോജിക	ñaṅṅaḷāl (also ñaṅṅāl)	nammāl	niṅṅaḷāl	avarāl
Locative ആധാരിക	ñaṅṅaḷil	nammil	niṅṅaḷil	avaril (also avaṟkal)
Sociative സംയോജിക	ñaṅṅaḷōḍŭ	nammōḍŭ	niṅṅaḷōḍŭ	avarōḍŭ

=== Other nouns ===
The following are examples of some of the most common declension patterns.

Word (translated)	"Tree"		"Elephant"		"Human"		"Dog"	
Case	Singular	Plural	Singular	Plural	Singular	Plural	Singular	Plural
Nominative	മരം maram	മരങ്ങൾ maraṅṅaḷ	ആന āṉa	ആനകൾ āṉakaḷ	മനുഷ്യൻ maṉuṣyaṉ	മനുഷ്യർ maṉuṣyaṟ	പട്ടി paṭṭi	പട്ടികൾ paṭṭigaḷ
Vocative	മരമേ maramē	മരങ്ങളേ maraṅṅaḷē	ആനേ āṉē	ആനകളേ āṉakaḷē	മനുഷ്യാ maṉuṣyā	മനുഷ്യരേ maṉuṣyarē	പട്ടീ paṭṭī	പട്ടികളേ paṭṭikaḷē
Accusative	മരത്തെ maratte	മരങ്ങളെ maraṅṅaḷe	ആനയെ āṉaye	ആനകളെ āṉakaḷe	മനുഷ്യനെ maṉuṣyaṉe	മനുഷ്യരെ maṉuṣyare	പട്ടിയെ paṭṭiye	പട്ടികളെ paṭṭikaḷe
Genitive	മരത്തിൻ്റെ marattiṉḏe	മരങ്ങളുടെ maraṅṅaḷuḍe	ആനയുടെ āṉayuḍe	ആനകളുടെ āṉagaḷuḍe	മനുഷ്യൻ്റെ maṉuṣyaṉḏe	മനുഷ്യരുടെ maṉuṣyaruḍe	പട്ടിയുടെ paṭṭiyuḍe	പട്ടികളുടെ paṭṭikaḷuḍe
Dative	മരത്തിന് marattiṉŭ	മരങ്ങൾക്ക് maraṅṅaḷkkŭ	ആനയ്ക്ക് āṉaykkŭ	ആനകൾക്ക് āṉakaḷkkŭ	മനുഷ്യന് maṉuṣyaṉŭ	മനുഷ്യർക്ക് maṉuṣyaṟkkŭ	പട്ടിയ്ക്ക് paṭṭiykkŭ	പട്ടികൾക്ക് paṭṭikaḷkkŭ
Instrumental	മരത്താൽ marattāl	മരങ്ങളാൽ maraṅṅaḷāl	ആനയാൽ āṉayāl	ആനകളാൽ āṉakaḷāl	മനുഷ്യനാൽ maṉuṣyaṉāl	മനുഷ്യരാൽ maṉuṣyarāl	പട്ടിയാൽ paṭṭiyāl	പട്ടികളാൽ paṭṭikaḷāl
Locative	മരത്തിൽ marattil	മരങ്ങളിൽ maraṅṅaḷil	ആനയിൽ āṉayil	ആനകളിൽ āṉakaḷil	മനുഷ്യനിൽ maṉuṣyaṉil	മനുഷ്യരിൽ maṉuṣyaril	പട്ടിയിൽ paṭṭiyil	പട്ടികളിൽ paṭṭikaḷil
Sociative	മരത്തോട് marattōḍŭ	മരങ്ങളോട് maraṅṅaḷōḍŭ	ആനയോട് āṉayōḍŭ	ആനകളോട് āṉakaḷōḍŭ	മനുഷ്യനോട് maṉuṣyaṉōḍŭ	മനുഷ്യരോട് maṉuṣyarōḍŭ	പട്ടിയോട് paṭṭiyōḍŭ	പട്ടികളോട് paṭṭikaḷōḍŭ

=== Words adopted from Sanskrit ===
When words are adopted from Sanskrit, their endings are usually changed to conform to Malayalam norms:

==== Nouns ====
- Masculine Sanskrit nouns with a word stem ending in a short /a/ take the ending /an/ in the nominative singular. For example, Kr̥ṣṇa → Kr̥ṣṇan. The final /n/ is dropped before masculine surnames, honorifics, or titles ending in /an/ and beginning with a consonant other than /n/ – e.g., "Krishna Menon", "Krishna Kaniyaan" etc., but "Krishnan Ezhutthachan". Surnames ending with /ar/ or /aḷ/ (where these are plural forms of "an" denoting respect) are treated similarly – "Krishna Pothuval", "Krishna Chakyar", but "Krishnan Nair", "Krishnan Nambiar", as are Sanskrit surnames such "Varma(n)", "Sharma(n)", or "Gupta(n)" (rare) – e.g., "Krishna Varma", "Krishna Sharman". If a name is a compound, only the last element undergoes this transformation – e.g., "Kr̥ṣṇa" + "dēva" = "Kr̥ṣṇadēvan", not "Kr̥ṣṇandēvan".
- Feminine words ending in a long /ā/ or /ī/ are changed to end in a short /a/ or /i/, for example, "Sītā" → "Sīta" and "Lakṣmī" → "Lakṣmi". However, the long vowel still appears in compound words, such as "Sītādēvi" or" Lakṣmīdēvi". The long ī is generally reserved for the vocative forms of these names, although in Sanskrit the vocative actually takes a short /i/. There are also a small number of nominative /ī/ endings that have not been shortened – a prominent example being the word "strī" for "woman".
- Nouns that have a stem in /-an/ and which end with a long /ā/ in the masculine nominative singular have /vŭ/ added to them, for example "Brahmā" (stem "Brahman") → "Brahmāvŭ". When the same nouns are declined in the neuter and take a short /a/ ending in Sanskrit, Malayalam adds an additional /m/, e.g. "Brahma" (neuter nominative singular of "Brahman") becomes "Brahmam". This is again omitted when forming compounds.
- Words whose roots end in /-an/ but whose nominative singular ending is /-a-/ (for example, the Sanskrit root of "karma" is actually "karman") are also changed. The original root is ignored and "karma" (the form in Malayalam being "karmam" because it ends in a short /a/) is taken as the basic form of the noun when declining. However, this does not apply to all consonant stems, as "unchangeable" stems such as "manas" ("mind") and "suhr̥t" ("friend") are identical to the Malayalam nominative singular forms (although the regularly derived "manam" sometimes occurs as an alternative to "manas").
- Sanskrit words describing things or animals rather than people with a stem in short /a/ end with an /m/ in Malayalam. For example, "Rāmāyaṇa" → "Rāmāyaṇam". In most cases, this is actually the same as the Sanskrit accusative case ending, which is also /m/ (or, allophonically, anusvara due to the requirements of the sandhi word-combining rules) in the neuter nominative. However, "things and animals" and "people" are not always differentiated based on whether or not they are sentient beings; for example, "Narasimha" becomes "Narasiṃham" and not "Narasiṃhan", whereas "Ananta" becomes "Anantan" even though both are sentient. This does not strictly correspond to the Sanskrit neuter gender, as both "Narasiṃha" and "Ananta" are masculine nouns in the original Sanskrit.
- Nouns with short vowel stems other than /a/, such as "Viṣṇu", "Prajāpati" etc. are declined with the Sanskrit stem acting as the Malayalam nominative singular (the Sanskrit nominative singular is formed by adding a visarga, e.g., as in "Viṣṇuḥ")
- The original Sanskrit vocative is often used in formal or poetic Malayalam, e.g. "Harē" (for "Hari") or "Prabhō" (for "Prabhu" – "Lord"). This is restricted to certain contexts – mainly when addressing deities or other exalted individuals, so a normal man named Hari would usually be addressed using a Malayalam vocative such as "Harī". The Sanskrit genitive is also occasionally found in Malayalam poetry, especially the personal pronouns "mama" ("my" or "mine") and "tava" ("thy" or "thine"). Other cases are less common and generally restricted to the realm of Maṇipravāḷam.
- Along with these tatsama borrowings, there are also many tadbhava words in common use. These were incorporated via borrowing before the separation of Malayalam and Tamil. As the language did not then accommodate Sanskrit phonology as it now does, words were changed to conform to the Old Tamil phonological system, for example "Kr̥ṣṇa" → "Kaṇṇan". Most of his works are oriented on the basic Malayalam family and cultures and many of them were path-breaking in the history of Malayalam literature

== Writing system ==
Aside from the Malayalam script, the Malayalam language has been written in other scripts like Latin, Syriac and Arabic. Suriyani Malayalam was used by Saint Thomas Christians (also known as Nasranis) until the 19th century. Arabic scripts particularly were taught in madrasahs in Kerala and the Lakshadweep Islands.

=== Malayalam script ===
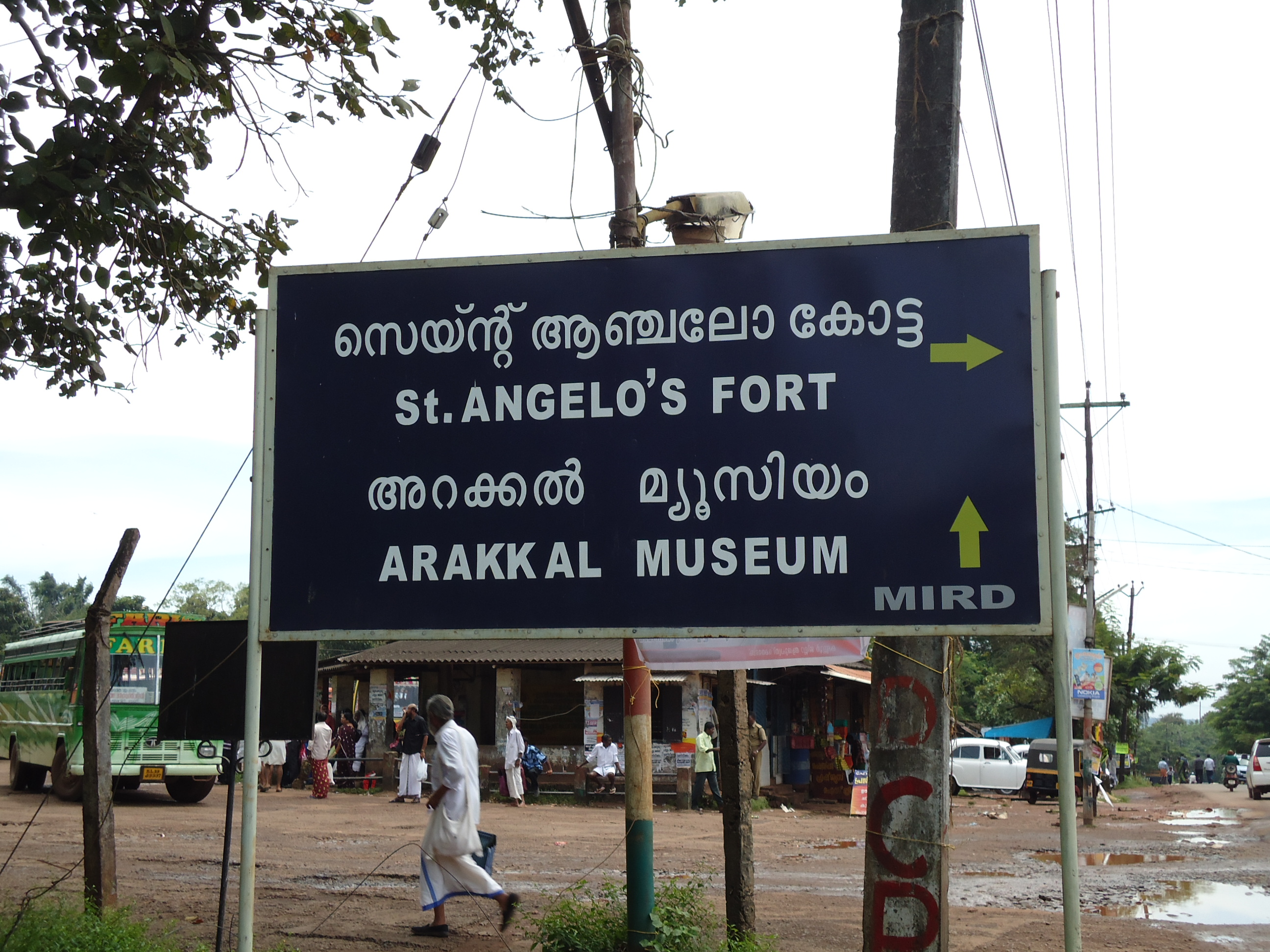
A Malayalam signboard from Kannur, Kerala. Malayalam is official language in the Indian state of Kerala and the union territories of Lakshadweep and Puduchery

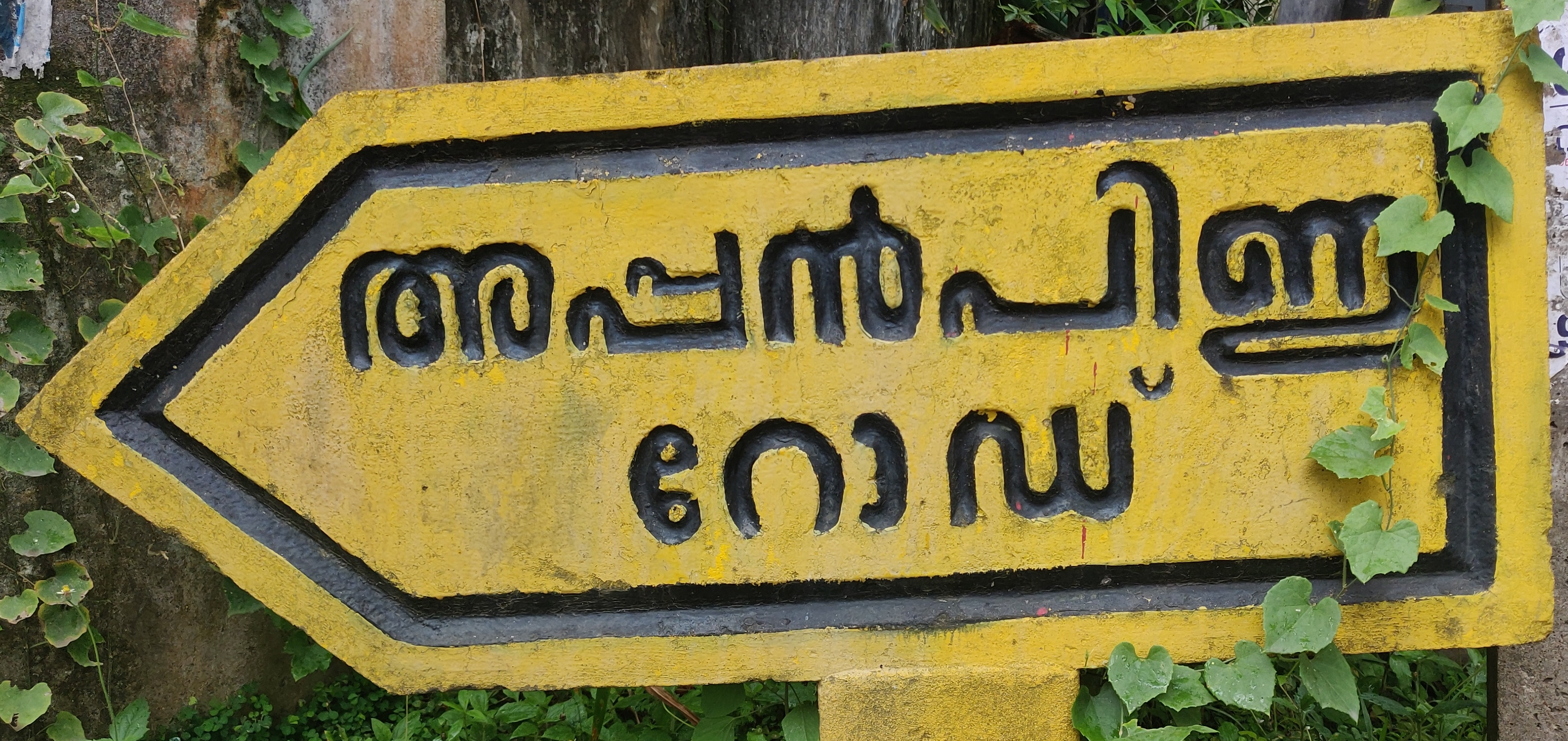
A Board in Malayalam which uses the complex letters in traditional script

Historically, several scripts were used to write Malayalam. Among these were the Vatteluttu, Kolezhuthu and Malayanma scripts. But it was the Grantha script, another Southern Brahmi variation, which gave rise to the modern Malayalam script. The modern Malayalam script bears high similarity to the Tigalari script, which was used for writing the Tulu language in Coastal Karnataka (Dakshina Kannada and Udupi districts) and the northernmost Kasaragod district of Kerala. It is syllabic in the sense that the sequence of graphic elements means that syllables have to be read as units, though in this system the elements representing individual vowels and consonants are for the most part readily identifiable. In the 1960s Malayalam dispensed with many special letters representing less frequent conjunct consonants and combinations of the vowel /u, u:/ with different consonants.

Malayalam script consists of a total of 578 characters. The script contains 52 letters including 16 vowels and 36 consonants, which forms 576 syllabic characters, and contains two additional diacritic characters named anusvāra and visarga. The earlier style of writing has been superseded by a new style as of 1981. This new script reduces the different letters for typesetting from 900 to fewer than 90. This was mainly done to include Malayalam in the keyboards of typewriters and computers.

In 1999 a group named "Rachana Akshara Vedi" produced a set of free fonts containing the entire character repertoire of more than 900 glyphs. This was announced and released along with a text editor in the same year at Thiruvananthapuram, the capital of Kerala. In 2004, the fonts were released under the GPL license by Richard Stallman. A dedicated Malayalam operating system was released in 2006.

=== Chillu letters ===
A chillu (ചില്ല്, cillŭ), or a chillaksharam (ചില്ലക്ഷരം, cillakṣaram), is a special consonant letter that represents a pure consonant independently, without the help of a virama. Unlike a consonant represented by an ordinary consonant letter, this consonant is never followed by an inherent vowel. Anusvara and visarga fit this definition but are not usually included. ISCII and Unicode 5.0 treat a chillu as a glyph variant of a normal ("base") consonant letter. In Unicode 5.1 and later, chillu letters are treated as independent characters, encoded atomically.

Chillu letters
Letter	Unicode name	Base	Remarks	Examples
ൺ	CHILLU NN	ṇa ണ		കൂൺ (kūṇ, "mushroom")
ൻ	CHILLU N	ṉa ന	Chillu of dental – alveolar nasal ṉa.	അവൻ (avaṉ, "he")
ർ	CHILLU RR	ṟa റ	Historically stood for ra ര, not ṟa റ.	അവർ (avar̠, "they")
ൽ	CHILLU L	la ല		കാൽ (kāl, "foot")
ൾ	CHILLU LL	ḷa ള		അവൾ (avaḷ, "she")
ൿ	CHILLU K	ka ക	Not in modern use	വാൿചാതുരി (doesn't occur word finally.)
ൔ	CHILLU M	ma മ	Not in modern use	
ൕ	CHILLU Y	ya യ	Not in modern use	
ൖ	CHILLU LLL	ḻa ഴ	Not in modern use	

=== Number system and other symbols ===
Praślēṣam	ഽ	Corresponds to Devanagari avagraha, used when a Sanskrit phrase containing an avagraha is written in Malayalam script. The symbol indicates the elision of the word-initial vowel a after a word that ends in ā, ē, or ō, and is transliterated as an apostrophe ('), or sometimes as a colon + an apostrophe (:'). (Malayalam: പ്രശ്ലേഷം, praślēṣam)
Malayalam date mark	൹	Used in an abbreviation of a date.
Daṇḍa	।	Archaic punctuation marks.
Double daṇḍa	॥	Archaic punctuation marks.

=== Numerals ===
Malayalam numbers and fractions are written as follows. These are archaic and no longer used. Instead, the common Hindu-Arabic numeral system is followed. There is a confusion about the glyph of Malayalam digit zero. The correct form is oval-shaped, but occasionally the glyph for 1/4 (൳) is erroneously shown as the glyph for 0.

0	1	2	3	4	5	6	7	8	9	10	100	1000	1/4	1/2	3/4
൦	൧	൨	൩	൪	൫	൬	൭	൮	൯	൰	൱	൲	൳	൴	൵

Number "11" is written as "൰൧" and not "൧൧". "32" is written as "൩൰൨" similar to the Tamil numeral system.

11	20	21	30	110	10,099
൰൧	൨൰	൨൰൧	൩൰	൱൰	൰൲൯൰൯

For example, the number "2013" is read in Malayalam as രണ്ടായിരത്തി പതിമൂന്ന് (raṇḍāyiratti padimūnnŭ). It is split into:

- രണ്ട് (raṇḍŭ): 2 – ൨
- ആയിരം (āyiram): 1000 – ൲
- പത്ത് (pattŭ): 10 – ൰
- മൂന്ന് (mūnnŭ): 3 – ൩

Combine them together to get the Malayalam number ൨൲൰൩.

And 1,00,000 as "൱൲" = hundred(൱), thousand(൲) (100×1000), 10,00,000 as "൰൱൲" = ten(൰), hundred(൱), thousand(൲) (10×100×1000) and 1,00,00,000 as "൱൱൲" = hundred(൱), hundred(൱), thousand(൲) (100×100×1000).

Later on this system got reformed to be more similar to the Hindu-Arabic numerals so 10,00,000 in the reformed numerals it would be ൧൦൦൦൦൦൦.

=== Fractions ===
In Malayalam you can transcribe any fraction by affixing (-il) after the denominator followed by the numerator, so a fraction like 7/10 would be read as പത്തിൽ ഏഴ് (pattil ēḻŭ) 'out of ten, seven' but fractions like 1/2 1/4 and 3/4 have distinct names (ara, kāl, mukkāl) and 1/8 (arakkāl) 'half quarter'.

=== Vattezhuthu alphabet ===
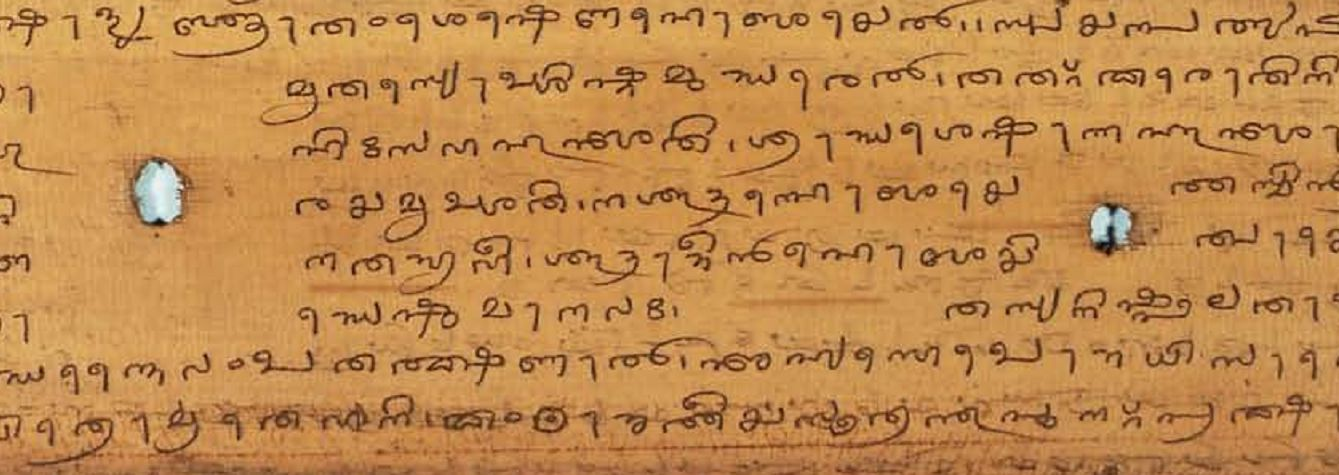
A medieval Tigalari manuscript (Bears high similarity with modern Malayalam script)

Vatteluttu (Malayalam: വട്ടെഴുത്ത്, Vaṭṭezhuthŭ, "round writing") is a script that had evolved from Tamil-Brahmi and was once used extensively in the southern part of present-day Tamil Nadu and in Kerala.

Malayalam was first written in Vattezhuthu. The Vazhappally inscription issued by Rajashekhara Varman is the earliest example, dating from about 830 CE. During the medieval period, the Tigalari script that was used for writing Tulu in South Canara, and Sanskrit in the adjacent Malabar region, had a close similarity to the modern Malayalam script. In the Tamil country, the modern Tamil script had supplanted Vattezhuthu by the 15th century, but in the Malabar region, Vattezhuthu remained in general use up to the 17th century, or the 18th century. A variant form of this script, Kolezhuthu, was used until about the 19th century mainly in the Malabar-Cochin area.

Vatteluttu was in general use, but was not suitable for literature where many Sanskrit words were used. Like Tamil-Brahmi, it was originally used to write Tamil, and as such, did not have letters for voiced or aspirated consonants used in Sanskrit but not used in Tamil. For this reason, Vatteluttu and the Grantha alphabet were sometimes mixed, as in the Manipravalam. One of the oldest examples of the Manipravalam literature, Vaishikatantram (വൈശികതന്ത്രം, Vaiśikatantram), dates back to the 12th century, where the earliest form of the Malayalam script was used, which seems to have been systematized to some extent by the first half of the 13th century.

Another variant form, Malayanma, was used in the south of Thiruvananthapuram. By the 19th century, old scripts like Kolezhuthu had been supplanted by Arya-eluttu – that is the current Malayalam script. Nowadays, it is widely used in the press of the Malayali population in Kerala.

=== Grantha ===
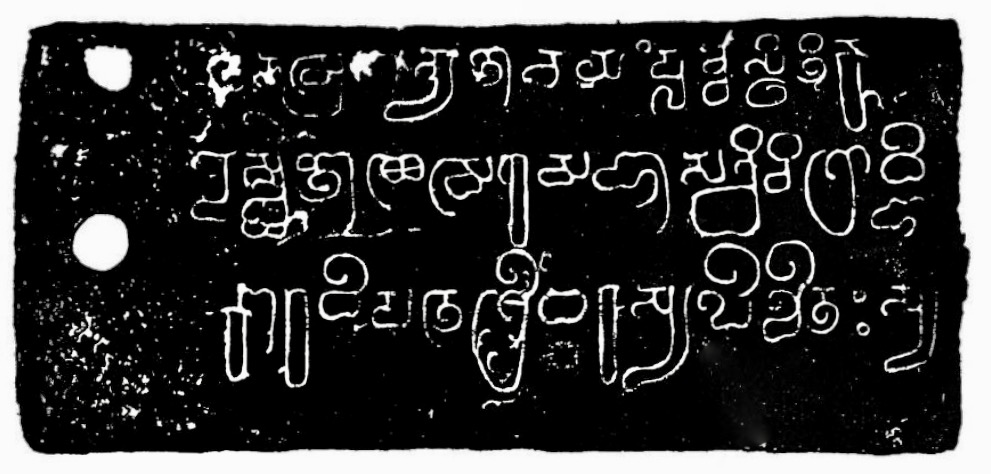
A Chera era Grantha inscription

According to Arthur Coke Burnell, one form of the Grantha alphabet, originally used in the Chola dynasty, was imported into the southwest coast of India in the 8th or 9th century, which was then modified in course of time in this secluded area, where communication with the east coast was very limited. It later evolved into Tigalari-Malayalam script was used by the Malayali, Havyaka Brahmins and Tulu Brahmin people, but was originally only applied to write Sanskrit. This script split into two scripts: Tigalari and Malayalam. While Malayalam script was extended and modified to write vernacular language Malayalam, the Tigalari was written for Sanskrit only. In Malabar, this writing system was termed Arya-eluttu (ആര്യ എഴുത്ത്, Ārya eḻuttŭ), meaning "Arya writing" (Sanskrit is Indo-Aryan language while Malayalam is a Dravidian language).

=== Karshoni ===
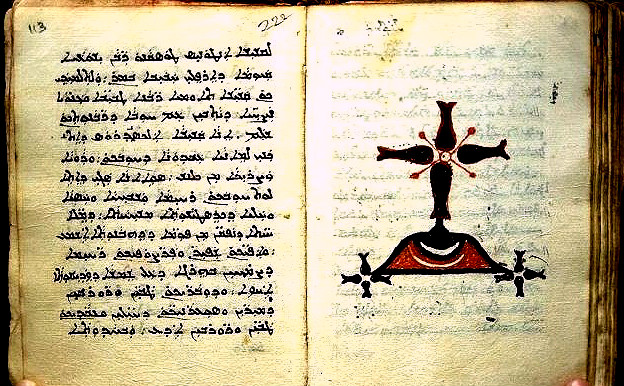
East Syriac Script Thaksa (Chaldean Syrian Church, Thrissur, Kerala, India)

Suriyani Malayalam (സുറിയാനി മലയാളം, ܣܘܪܝܢܝ ܡܠܝܠܡ), also known as Karshoni, Syro-Malabarica or Syriac Malayalam, is a version of Malayalam written in a variant form of the Syriac alphabet which was popular among the Saint Thomas Christians (also known as Syrian Christians or Nasranis) of Kerala in India. It uses Malayalam grammar, the Maḏnḥāyā or "Eastern" Syriac script with special orthographic features, and vocabulary from Malayalam and East Syriac. This originated in the South Indian region of the Malabar Coast (modern-day Kerala). Until the 20th century, the script was widely used by Syrian Christians in Kerala.

=== Ponnani script ===
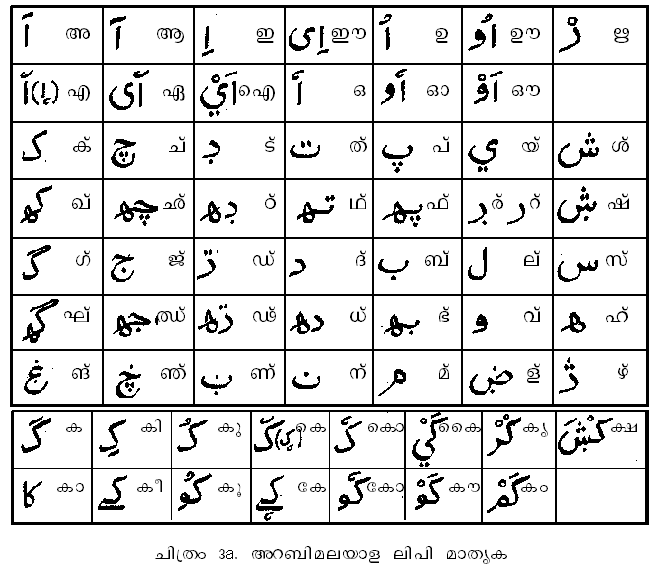
Arabi Malayalam alphabet with Malayalam alphabet correspondences

The Arabi Malayalam script, otherwise known as the Ponnani script, is a writing system – a variant form of the Arabic script with special orthographic features – which was developed during the early medieval period and used to write Arabi Malayalam until the early 20th century CE. Though the script originated and developed in Kerala, today it is predominantly used in Malaysia and Singapore by the migrant Muslim community.

== Literature ==
The Sangam literature can be considered as the ancient predecessor of Malayalam. According to Iravatham Mahadevan, the earliest Malayalam inscription discovered until now is the Edakal-5 inscription (ca. late 4th century – early 5th century) reading ī pazhama (transl. 'this is old'). Although this has been disputed by many scholars who regard it as a regional dialect of Old Tamil. The use of the pronoun ī and the lack of the literary Tamil -ai ending are archaisms from Proto-Dravidian rather than unique innovations of Malayalam. (Note: "*aH and *iH are demonstrative adjectives reconstructed for Proto-Dravidian, as they show variation in vowel length. When they occur in isolation they occur as ā, and ī but when they are followed by a consonant initial word then they appear as a- and i- as in Ta. appoẓutu 'that time'.,: Te. appuḍu id. and Ta. ippoẓutu 'that time'.,: Te.ippuḍu id. However, Modern Tamil has replaced ā, and ī with anda and inda but most Dravidian languages have preserved it.")

The early literature of Malayalam comprised three types of composition: Malayalam Nada, Tamil Nada and Sanskrit Nada.

- Classical songs known as Nadan Pattu
- Manipravalam of the Sanskrit tradition, which permitted a generous interspersing of Sanskrit with Malayalam. Niranam poets Manipravalam Madhava Panikkar, Sankara Panikkar and Rama Panikkar wrote Manipravalam poetry in the 14th century.
- The folk song rich in native elements

Malayalam literature has been profoundly influenced by poets Cherusseri Namboothiri, Thunchaththu Ezhuthachan, and Poonthanam Nambudiri, in the 15th and the 16th centuries of Common Era. Unnayi Variyar, a probable 17th–18th century poet, and Kunchan Nambiar, a poet of 18th century, also greatly influenced Malayalam literature in its early form. The words used in many of the Arabi Malayalam works those date back to 16th–17th centuries of Common Era are also very closer to the modern Malayalam language. The prose literature, criticism, and Malayalam journalism began after the latter half of 18th century CE. Contemporary Malayalam literature deals with social, political, and economic life context. The tendency of modern poetry is often towards political radicalism. Malayalam literature has been presented with six Jnanapith awards, the second-highest for any Dravidian language and the third-highest for any Indian language.

Malayalam poetry to the late 20th century betrays varying degrees of the fusion of the three different strands. The oldest examples of Pattu and Manipravalam, respectively, are Ramacharitam and Vaishikatantram, both from the 12th century.

The earliest extant prose work in the language is a commentary in simple Malayalam, Bhashakautalyam (12th century) on Chanakya's Arthashastra. Adhyatmaramayanam by Thunchaththu Ramanujan Ezhuthachan (known as the father of modern Malayalam literature) who was born in Tirur, one of the most important works in Malayalam literature. Unnunili Sandesam written in the 14th century is among the oldest literary works in Malayalam language. Cherusseri Namboothiri of 15th century (Kannur-based poet), Poonthanam Nambudiri of 16th century (Perinthalmanna-based poet), Unnayi Variyar of 17th–18th centuries (Thrissur-based poet), and Kunchan Nambiar of 18th century (Palakkad-based poet), have played a major role in the development of Malayalam literature into current form. The words used in many of the Arabi Malayalam works, which dates back to 16th–17th centuries are also very closer to modern Malayalam language. The basin of the river Bharathappuzha, which is otherwise known as River Ponnani, and its tributaries, have played a major role in the development of modern Malayalam Literature.

By the end of the 18th century some of the Christian missionaries from Kerala started writing in Malayalam but mostly travelogues, dictionaries and religious books. Varthamanappusthakam (1778), written by Paremmakkal Thoma Kathanar is considered to be the first travelogue in an Indian language. The modern Malayalam grammar is based on the book Kerala Panineeyam written by A. R. Raja Raja Varma in the late 19th century CE.

=== Folk Songs ===
For the first 600 years of the Malayalam calendar, Malayalam literature remained in a preliminary stage. During this time, Malayalam literature consisted mainly of various genres of songs (Pattu). Folk songs are the oldest literary form in Malayalam. They were just oral songs. Many of them were related to agricultural activities, including Pulayar Pattu, Pulluvan Pattu, Njattu Pattu, Koythu Pattu, etc. Other Ballads of Folk Song period include the Vadakkan Pattukal (Northern songs) in North Malabar region and the Thekkan Pattukal (Southern songs) in Southern Travancore. Some of the earliest Mappila songs (Muslim songs) were also folk songs.

=== Old and Middle Malayalam ===
The earliest known poems in Malayalam, Ramacharitam and Thirunizhalmala, dated to the 12th to 14th century, were completed before the introduction of the Sanskrit alphabet. It was written by a poet with the pen name Cheeramakavi who, according to poet Ulloor S Parameswara Iyer, was Sree Veerarama Varman, a king of southern Kerala from AD 1195 to 1208. However the claim that it was written in Southern Kerala is expired on the basis of new discoveries. Other experts, like Chirakkal T Balakrishnan Nair, K.M. George, M. M. Purushothaman Nair, and P.V. Krishnan Nair, state that the origin of the book is in Kasaragod district in North Malabar region. They cite the use of certain words in the book and also the fact that the manuscript of the book was recovered from Nileshwaram in North Malabar. The influence of Ramacharitam is mostly seen in the contemporary literary works of Northern Kerala. The words used in Ramacharitam such as Nade (Mumbe), Innum (Iniyum), Ninna (Ninne), Chaaduka (Eriyuka) are special features of the dialect spoken in North Malabar (Kasaragod-Kannur region). Furthermore, the Thiruvananthapuram mentioned in Ramacharitham is not the Thiruvananthapuram in Southern Kerala. But it is Ananthapura Lake Temple of Kumbla in the northernmost Kasaragod district of Kerala. The word Thiru is used just by the meaning Honoured. Today it is widely accepted that Ramacharitham was written somewhere in North Malabar (most likely near Kasaragod).

But the period of the earliest available literary document cannot be the sole criterion used to determine the antiquity of a language. In its early literature, Malayalam has songs, Pattu, for various subjects and occasions, such as harvesting, love songs, heroes, gods, etc. A form of writing called Campu emerged from the 14th century onwards. It mixed poetry with prose and used a vocabulary strongly influenced by Sanskrit, with themes from epics and Puranas.

The works including Unniyachi Charitham, Unnichirudevi Charitham, and Unniyadi Charitham, are written in Middle Malayalam, those date back to 13th and 14th centuries of Common Era. The Sandesha Kavyas of 14th century CE written in Manipravalam language include Unnuneeli Sandesam The literary works written in Middle Malayalam were heavily influenced by Sanskrit and Prakrit, while comparing them with the modern Malayalam literature. The word Manipravalam literally means Diamond-Coral or Ruby-Coral. The 14th-century Lilatilakam text states Manipravalam to be a Bhashya (language) where "Malayalam and Sanskrit should combine together like ruby and coral, without the least trace of any discord". The Champu Kavyas written by Punam Nambudiri, one among the Pathinettara Kavikal (Eighteen and a half poets) in the court of the Zamorin of Calicut, also belong to Middle Malayalam.

=== Modern Malayalam ===
The poem Krishnagatha written by Cherusseri Namboothiri, who was the court poet of the king Udaya Varman Kolathiri (1446–1475) of Kolathunadu, is written in modern Malayalam. The language used in Krishnagatha is the modern spoken form of Malayalam. It appears to be the first literary work written in the present-day language of Malayalam. During the 16th century CE, Thunchaththu Ezhuthachan from the Kingdom of Tanur and Poonthanam Nambudiri from the Kingdom of Valluvanad followed the new trend initiated by Cherussery in their poems. The Adhyathmaramayanam Kilippattu and Mahabharatham Kilippattu written by Ezhuthachan and Jnanappana written by Poonthanam are also included in the earliest form of Modern Malayalam. The words used in most of the Arabi Malayalam works, which dates back to 16th–17th centuries, are also very closer to modern Malayalam language. P. Shangunny Menon ascribes the authorship of the medieval work Keralolpathi, which describes the Parashurama legend and the departure of the final Cheraman Perumal king to Mecca, to Thunchaththu Ramanujan Ezhuthachan.

The Thunchath Ezhuthachan Malayalam University is situated at Thunchan Parambu, Tirur, Malappuram

Kunchan Nambiar, the founder of Thullal movement, was a prolific literary figure of the 18th century.

==== Impact of European scholars ====
Cover page of Nasranikal okkekkum ariyendunna samkshepavedartham which is the first book to be printed in Malayalam in 1772.

The British printed Malabar English Dictionary by Graham Shaw in 1779 was still in the form of a Tamil-English Dictionary. Paremmakkal Thoma Kathanar wrote the first Malayalam travelogue called Varthamanappusthakam in 1789.

Hermann Gundert, (1814–1893), a German missionary and scholar of exceptional linguistic talents, played a distinguishable role in the development of Malayalam literature. His major works are Keralolpathi (1843), Pazhancholmala (1845), Malayalabhaasha Vyakaranam (1851), Paathamala (1860) the first Malayalam school text book, Kerala pazhama (1868), the first Malayalam dictionary (1872), Malayalarajyam (1879) – Geography of Kerala, Rajya Samacharam (1847 June) the first Malayalam news paper, Paschimodayam (1879) – Magazine. He lived in Thalassery for around 20 years. He learned the language from well established local teachers Ooracheri Gurukkanmar from Chokli, a village near Thalassery and consulted them in works. He also translated the Bible into Malayalam.

In 1821, the Church Mission Society (CMS) at Kottayam in association with the Syriac Orthodox Church started a seminary at Kottayam in 1819 and started printing books in Malayalam when Benjamin Bailey, an Anglican priest, made the first Malayalam types. In addition, he contributed to standardizing the prose. Hermann Gundert from Stuttgart, Germany, started the first Malayalam newspaper, Rajya Samacaram in 1847 at Talasseri. It was printed at Basel Mission. Malayalam and Sanskrit were increasingly studied by Christians of Kottayam and Pathanamthitta. The Marthomite movement in the mid-19th century called for replacement of Syriac by Malayalam for liturgical purposes. By the end of the 19th century Malayalam replaced Syriac as language of Liturgy in all Syrian Christian churches.

==== 1850–1904 ====
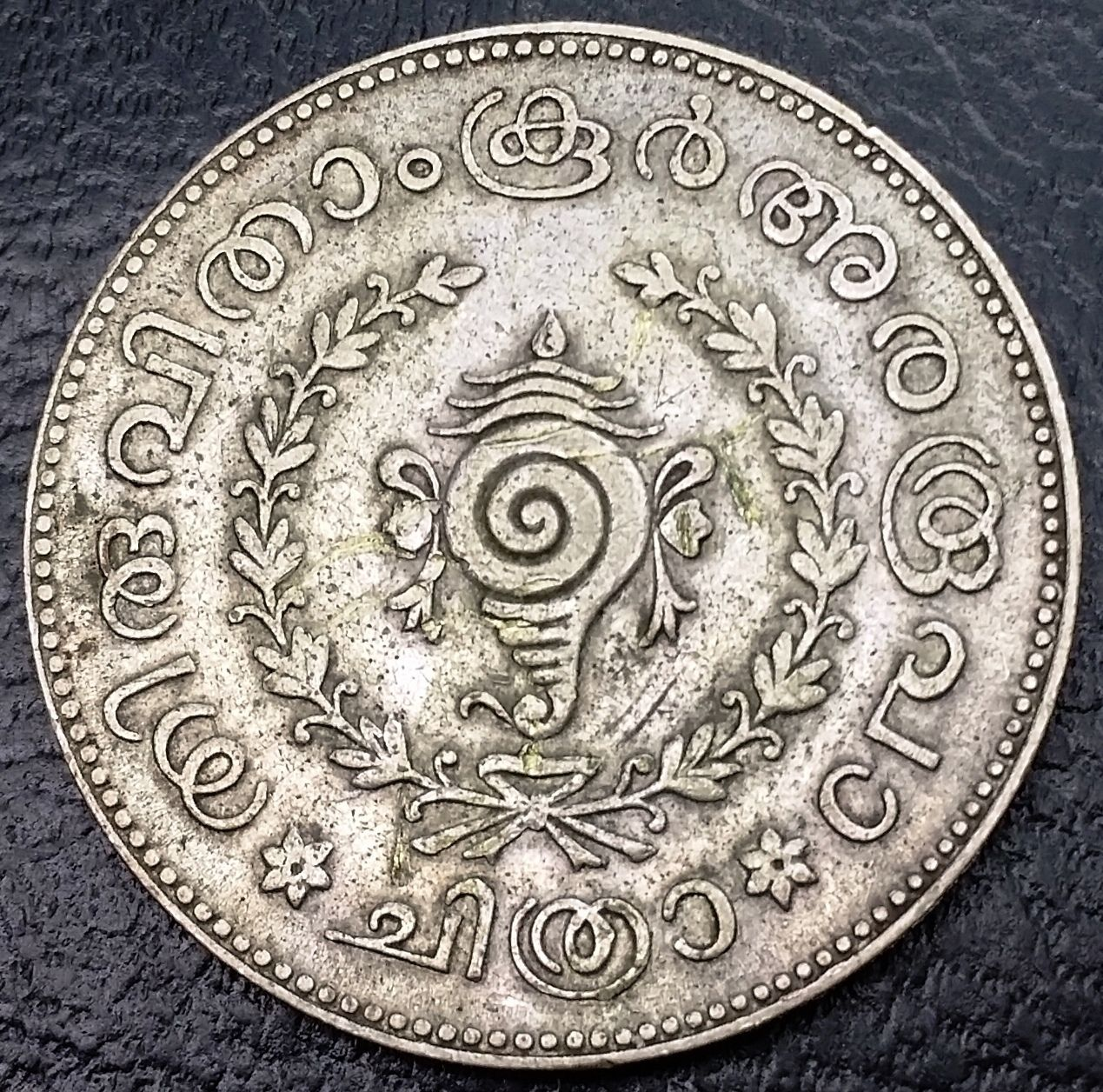
Malayalam letters on old Travancore Rupee coin

Vengayil Kunhiraman Nayanar, (1861–1914) from Thalassery was the author of first Malayalam short story, Vasanavikriti. After him innumerable world class literature works by was born in Malayalam.

O. Chandu Menon wrote his novels "Indulekha" and "Saradha" while he was the judge at Parappanangadi Munciff Court. Indulekha is also the first Major Novel written in Malayalam language.

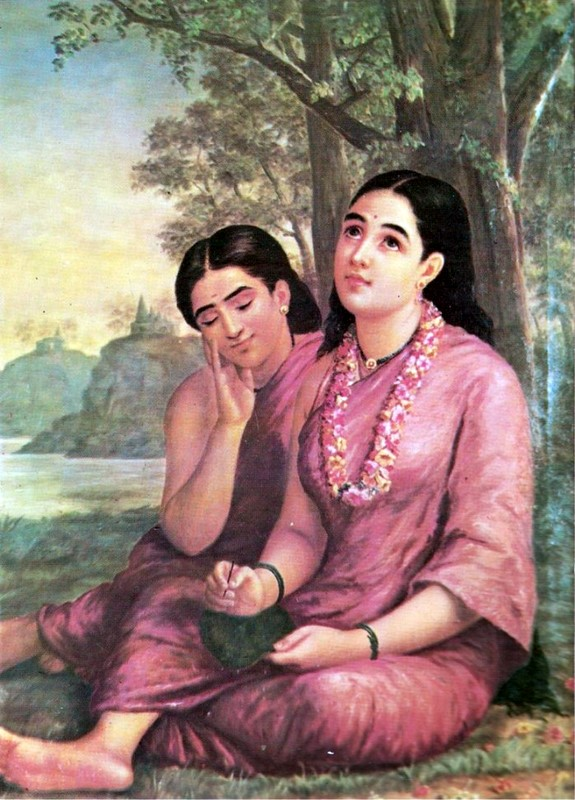
Shakuntala writes to Dushyanta. Painting by Raja Ravi Varma. The poetry was translated by Kerala Varma as Abhijnanasakuntalam

.

The third quarter of the 19th century CE bore witness to the rise of a new school of poets devoted to the observation of life around them and the use of pure Malayalam. The major poets of the Venmani School were Venmani Achhan Nambudiripad (1817–1891), Venmani Mahan Nambudiripad (1844–1893), Poonthottam Achhan Nambudiri (1821–1865), Poonthottam Mahan Nambudiri (1857–1896) and the members of the Kodungallur Kovilakam (Royal Family) such as Kodungallur Kunjikkuttan Thampuran. The style of these poets became quite popular for a while and influenced even others who were not members of the group like Velutheri Kesavan Vaidyar (1839–1897) and Perunlli Krishnan Vaidyan (1863–1894). The Venmani school pioneered a style of poetry that was associated with common day themes, and the use of pure Malayalam (Pachcha Malayalam) rather than Sanskrit.

=== Twentieth century ===
In the second half of the 20th century, Jnanpith winning poets and writers like G. Sankara Kurup, S. K. Pottekkatt, Thakazhi Sivasankara Pillai, M. T. Vasudevan Nair, O. N. V. Kurup, Edasseri Govindan Nair and Akkitham Achuthan Namboothiri, had made valuable contributions to the modern Malayalam literature. Later, writers like O. V. Vijayan, Kamaladas, M. Mukundan, Arundhati Roy, and Vaikom Muhammed Basheer, have gained international recognition.

==== Prose ====
The travelogues written by S. K. Pottekkatt were turning point in the travelogue literature. The writers like Kavalam Narayana Panicker have contributed much to Malayalam drama.

Thakazhi Sivasankara Pillai turned away from party politics and produced a moving romance in Chemmeen (Shrimps) in 1956. For S. K. Pottekkatt and Vaikom Muhammad Basheer, who had not dabbled in politics, the continuity is marked in the former's Vishakanyaka (Poison Maid, 1948) and the latter's Ntuppuppakkoranendarnnu (My Grandpa had an Elephant, 1951). The non-political social or domestic novel was championed by P. C. Kuttikrishnan (Uroob) with his Ummachu (1955) and Sundarikalum Sundaranmarum (Men and Women of Charm, 1958).

In 1957 Basheer's Pathummayude Aadu (Pathumma's Goat) brought in a new kind of prose tale, which perhaps only Basheer could handle with dexterity. The fifties thus mark the evolution of a new kind of fiction, which had its impact on the short stories as well. This was the auspicious moment for the entry of M. T. Vasudevan Nair and T. Padmanabhan upon the scene. Front runners in the post-modern trend include Kakkanadan, O. V. Vijayan, E. Harikumar, M. Mukundan and Anand.

Kerala has the highest media exposure in India with newspapers publishing in nine languages, mainly English and Malayalam.

==== Poetry ====
Contemporary Malayalam poetry deals with social, political, and economic life context. The tendency of the modern poetry is often towards political radicalism.

== See also ==
- Arabi Malayalam
- Jeseri
- Judeo-Malayalam
- Malayalam (Unicode block)
- Malayalam Braille
- Malayalam calendar
- Malayalam cinema
- Malayalam languages
- Malayalam literature
- Malayalam poetry
- Malayali
- Manipravalam
- Mulabhadra
- Mygurudu
- Suriyani Malayalam

== Sources ==
- Gopinathan Nair, B. (2009). "Malayalam". In Keith Brown; Sarah Ogilvie (eds.). Concise Encyclopedia of Languages of the World. pp. 680–683.
- Karashima, Noboru (2014). A Concise History of South India: Issues and Interpretations. Oxford University Press. ISBN 978-0-19-809977-2.
- Mahapatra, B. P. (1989). Constitutional Languages. The Written Languages of the World: A Survey of the Degree and Modes of Use. Vol. 2. Presses Université Laval. ISBN 978-2-7637-7186-1.
- Asher, R. E.; Kumari, T. C. (1997). Malayalam. Psychology Press. ISBN 978-0-415-02242-2.
- Govindankutty, A. "From Proto-Tamil-Malayalam to West Coast Dialects", 1972. Indo-Iranian Journal, Vol. XIV, Nr. 1/2, pp. 52–60.
- Steever, Sanford B. (15 April 2015). The Dravidian Languages. Routledge. ISBN 978-1-136-91171-2.
