= Kerala Panineeyam =

Grammar book by A. R. Raja Raja Varma

Keralapanineeyam
- Author: A. R. Raja Raja Varma
- Original title: കേരളപാണിനീയം
- Language: Malayalam
- Genre: Grammar
- Publication date: 1896
- Publication place: India
- ISBN: 978-8171306725
- Original text: കേരളപാണിനീയം at Malayalam Wikisource

Keralapanineeyam (or Kerala Panineeyam, Keralapaniniyam) is a treatise on Malayalam grammar and rhetoric, written by A. R. Raja Raja Varma, grammarian, litterateur and one of the pioneers of Malayalam Language studies. The book was first published in 1896 and earned its author the sobriquet, Kerala Panini, after the Sanskrit grammarian, Panini. It is considered to be an epoch making work on the growth and structure of Malayalam language.

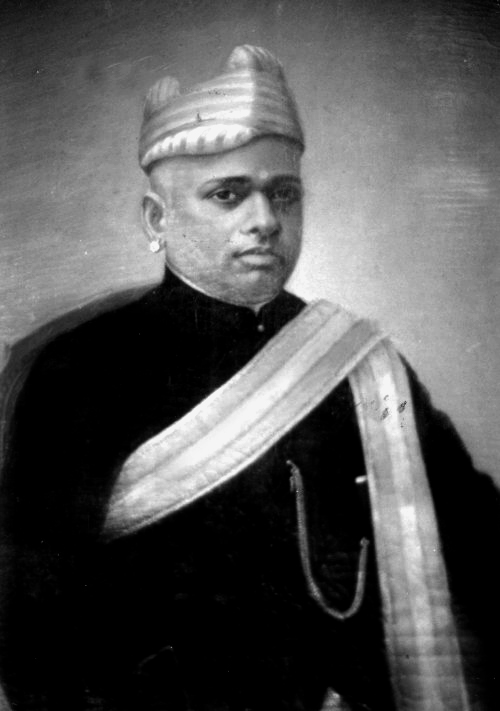

Keralapanineeyam consists of 8 sections and their subsections:

- Peedika – History of the Malayalam language, alphabets and language evolution.
- Sandhiprakaram – defines sentences and compound words
- Namadhikaram – discusses grammatical gender, countability, words formed by joining two or more words, adjectives, adverbs, formation of new words denoting a set of words
- Dhathwadhikaram – describes imperative sentences, active / passive sentences, prefix words (khiladathu), suffixes, affirmative/negative usages, complex and compound sentences
- Bhedhakadhikaram – further description of adjectives
- Nipathavyayadhikaram - describes words with multiple meanings/usages
- Akamshadhikaram – describes linking words
- Shabhdolpathi – essay on word formation and evolutions.

Keralapanineeyam was one of the first scientific descriptions of Malayalam grammar. A.R. Raja Raja Varma complemented the treatise with subsequent works such as Bhashabhooshanam and Vritha Manjari.

In 2017, on the 100th anniversary of its first publication, the digitised version of Keralapanineeyam was released by Sayahna Foundation under Creative Commons ShareAlike License.
