= Mulabhadra =

Medieval secret method of communication

Mūlabhadra (മൂലഭദ്ര) a.k.a. Mūlabhadri (ml:മൂലഭദ്രി) was a secret method of communication employed by the royal spies of the erstwhile Travancore Kingdom during the medieval period. The scheme was also colloquially referred to as Mūlapatra. It was essentially a cryptographic scheme involving a partial transposition of the letters of the Malayalam alphabet. The scheme had been extensively used by King Marthanda Varma (1706–1758) of Travancore Kingdom and his spies both for oral and written communication of messages. It was a fixed one-time unchangeable code in as much as it did not employ any key in its implementation in contrast to modern methods of substitution ciphers involving the utilisation of a key for generating a system of codes.

== The scheme ==
The following tables give the transposition scheme used in the Mulabhadra code.

=== Vowels ===
Clear text	അ	ആ	ഇ	ഈ	ഉ	ഊ	ഋ	എ	ഏ	ഐ	ഒ	ഓ	ഔ	അം	അഃ
Cipher text	ക	കാ	കി	കീ	കു	കൂ	കൃ	കെ	കേ	കൈ	കൊ	കോ	കൌ	കം	ക:

=== Consonants ===
Clear text	ക	ഖ	ഗ	ഘ	ങ	ച	ഛ	ജ	ഝ	ഞ	ട	ഠ	ഡ	ഢ	ണ	ത	ഥ	ദ	ധ	ന	പ	ഫ	ബ	ഭ	മ
Cipher text	അ	ഗ	ഖ	ങ	ഘ	ട	ഠ	ഡ	ഢ	ണ	ച	ഛ	ജ	ഝ	ഞ	പ	ഫ	ബ	ഭ	മ	ത	ഥ	ദ	ധ	ന

Clear text:	യ	ര	ല	വ	ശ	ഷ	സ	ഹ	ള	ന
Cipher text	ശ	ഷ	സ	ഹ	യ	ര	ല	വ	ക്ഷ	റ

=== Chillus ===
Clear text:	ല്‍	ന്‍	ര്‍	ള്‍
Cipher text	പ്	മ്	ഷ്	ക്ഷ്

=== Mnemonic ===
The users had developed a mnemonic to learn and remember this language. The mnemonic was very similar to Sanskrit slokas.

അകോഖഗോഘങശ്ചൈവ

ചടോഞണതപോമനഃ

യശോരഷോലസശ്ചൈവ

=== Examples ===
Clear text	പല്‍മനാഭപുരം	രാമന്‍	ആള്‍ക്കാര്‍
Cipher text	തസ്നറാധതുഷം	ഷാനമ്	കാക്ഷ് ആഷ്

== See also ==
- Mlecchita vikalpa
