= Malayalam literature =

Literary traditions of the Malayali people of India

Cover page of Nasranikal okkekkum ariyendunna samkshepavedartham, the first book to be printed in Malayalam in 1772.

Malayalam, the lingua franca of the Indian state of Kerala and the union territories of Lakshadweep and Mahé district (under Puduchery), is one of the eleven classical languages of India. Malayalam literature comprises those literary texts written in Malayalam, a South-Dravidian language spoken in the Indian state of Kerala. The first travelogue in any Indian language is the Malayalam Varthamanappusthakam, written by Paremmakkal Thoma Kathanar in 1785. Malayalam literature has been presented with 6 Jnanapith awards, the second-most for any Dravidian language and the third-highest for any Indian language.

The Sangam literature can be considered as the ancient predecessor of Malayalam. The origin of Malayalam calendar dates back to year 825 CE. It is generally agreed that the Quilon Syrian copper plates of 849/850 CE is the available oldest inscription written in Old Malayalam. The earliest known literary works in Malayalam are Ramacharitam (late 12th or early 13th century) and Thirunizhalmala, two epic poems written in Old Malayalam. In the subsequent centuries, besides a popular Pattu ("song") literature, the manipravalam poetry also flourished. Manipravalam (translates "ruby coral") style consisted of poetry in an admixture of Malayalam and Sanskrit. Then came works such as champus and sandeshakavyas in which prose and poetry were interspersed. Later, poets like Cherusseri introduced poems on devotional themes.

Designated a "Classical Language in India" in 2013, Malayalam literature developed into the current form mainly by the influence of the poets Cherusseri Namboothiri, Thunchaththu Ezhuthachan, and Poonthanam Nambudiri, in the 15th and the 16th centuries of Common Era. Thunchathu Ezhuthachchan is also known as The father of modern Malayalam literature. Kunchan Nambiar, a poet of 18th century CE, also has contributed much to Malayalam literature in its early form. The Bharathappuzha river, also known as River Ponnani, and its tributaries, have played a major role in the development of modern Malayalam Literature. There were also other important works, in Arabi Malayalam like Muhyadheen Mala, which was also produced in 16th-17th centuries of Common Era. The growth of Arabi Malayalam literature eventually lead to Mappila Songs. The words used in many of the Arabi Malayalam works those date back to 16th-17th centuries of Common Era are also very closer to the modern Malayalam language. Ezhuthachan, a strong proponent of Bhakti movement, is known as the father of Malayalam. His poems are classified under the genre of kilippattu.

The prose literature, criticism, and Malayalam journalism began after the latter half of the 18th century CE. Contemporary Malayalam literature deals with social, political, and economic life context. Modern literary movements in Malayalam literature began in the late 19th century with the rise of the famous Modern Triumvirate consisting of Kumaran Asan, Ulloor S. Parameswara Iyer and Vallathol Narayana Menon. Kumaran Asan was temperamentally a pessimist—a disposition reinforced by his metaphysics—yet all his life was active in promoting his downtrodden Hindu-Ezhava community. Ullor wrote in the classical tradition, appealing for universal love, while Vallathol responded to the human significance of social progress. Contemporary Malayalam poetry deals with social, political, and economic life context. The tendency of the modern poetry is often towards political radicalism. In the second half of the 20th century, Jnanpith winning poets and writers like G. Sankara Kurup, S. K. Pottekkatt, Thakazhi Sivasankara Pillai, Edasseri Govindan Nair, M. T. Vasudevan Nair, O. N. V. Kurup, and Akkitham Achuthan Namboothiri, had made valuable contributions to the modern Malayalam literature. Later, writers like O. V. Vijayan, Kamaladas, M. Mukundan, Arundhati Roy, and Vaikom Muhammed Basheer, have gained international recognition. The modern Malayalam grammar is based on the book Kerala Panineeyam written by A. R. Raja Raja Varma in the late 19th century CE.

== Evolution of Malayalam ==
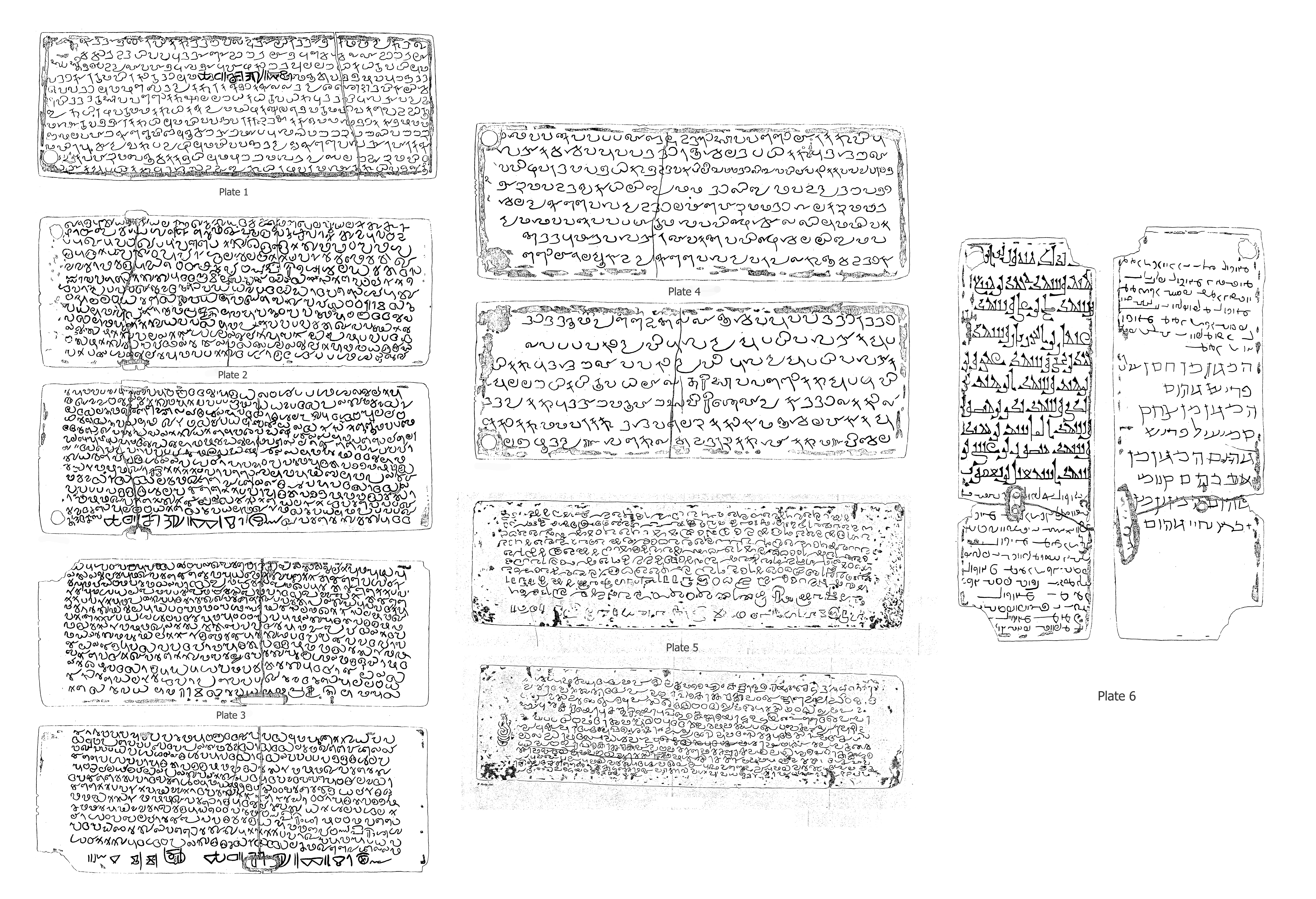
The Quilon Syrian copper plates (849/850 CE) is the available oldest inscription written in Old Malayalam. Besides Old Malayalam, the copper plate also contains signatures in Arabic (Kufic script), Middle Persian (cursive Pahlavi script) and Judeo-Persian (standard square Hebrew) scripts.

The western dialect of Old Tamil spoken in the southwestern Malabar Coast of India was known as Malanaattu Tamil/Malabar Tamil (Meaning the Tamil of the hilly region/the Tamil of Malabar) since the ancient Sangam period (300 BCE - 300 CE). Due to the geographical separation of the Malabar Coast from Tamil Nadu, and the presence of Western Ghats mountain ranges in between these two geographical regions, the dialect of Tamil spoken in the territory of the western Malabar Coast of the ancient Chera kingdom was different from that spoken in the Tamil-mainland. The generally held view is that Malayalam was the western coastal dialect Middle Tamil and started separation from Proto-Tamil-Malayalam sometime in the 8th century CE. The renowned poets of Classical Tamil such as Paranar (1st century CE), Ilango Adigal (2nd-3rd century CE), and Kulasekhara Alvar (9th century CE) were Keralites. The Sangam literature can be considered as the ancient predecessor of Malayalam.

Some scholars however believe that both Tamil and Malayalam developed during the prehistoric period from a common ancestor, 'Proto-Tamil-Malayalam', and that the notion of Malayalam being a 'daughter' of Tamil is misplaced. This is based on the fact that Malayalam and several Dravidian languages on the western coast have common archaic features which are not found even in the oldest historical forms of literary Tamil. However they share few striking innovations with Middle Tamil thus making independent descent impossible.

Old Malayalam (Pazhaya Malayalam), an inscriptional language found in Kerala from c. 9th to c. 13th century CE, is the earliest attested form of Malayalam. The start of the development of Old Malayalam from a western coastal dialect of contemporary Tamil (Middle Tamil) can be dated to c. 7th - 8th century CE. It remained a west coast dialect until c. 9th century CE or a little later. The origin of Malayalam calendar dates back to year 825 CE. The formation of the language is mainly attributed to geographical separation of Kerala from the Tamil country. It is generally agreed that the western coastal dialect of Tamil began to separate, diverge, and grow as a distinct language, mainly due to the heavy influence of Sanskrit and Prakrit, those became common prominent languages on Malabar Coast, when the caste system became strong in Kerala under Nambudiri Brahmins.

The Old Malayalam language was employed in several official records and transactions (at the level of the Chera Perumal kings as well as on the village temples). Most of the inscriptions in Old Malayalam were found from the northern districts of Kerala, those lie adjacent to Tulu Nadu. Old Malayalam was mostly written in Vatteluttu script (with Pallava/Southern Grantha characters). Old Malayalam had several features distinct from the contemporary Tamil, which include the Nasalisation of adjoining sounds, Substitution of palatal sounds for dental sounds, Contraction of vowels, and the Rejection of gender verbs.

The Old Malayalam got gradually developed into Middle Malayalam (Madhyakaala Malayalam) by the 13th century CE. The Malayalam literature also completely got diverged from Tamil literature by this period. Kannassa Ramayanam and Kannassa Bharatham by Rama Panikkar of the Niranam poets who lived between 1350 and 1450, are representative of this language. The Champu Kavyas written by Punam Nambudiri, one among the Pathinettara Kavikal (Eighteen and a half poets) in the court of the Zamorin of Calicut, also belong to Middle Malayalam. The literary works of this period were heavily influenced by Manipravalam, which was a combination of contemporary Malayalam and Sanskrit. The scripts of Kolezhuthu and Malayanma were also used to write Middle Malayalam, in addition to Vatteluthu and Grantha script those were used to write Old Malayalam.

The Middle Malayalam was succeeded by Modern Malayalam (Aadhunika Malayalam) by the 15th century CE. The poem Krishnagatha written by Cherusseri Namboothiri, who was the court poet of the king Udaya Varman Kolathiri (1446 – 1475) of Kolathunadu, is written in modern Malayalam. The language used in Krishnagatha is the modern spoken form of Malayalam. During the 16th century CE, Thunchaththu Ezhuthachan from the Kingdom of Tanur and Poonthanam Nambudiri from the Kingdom of Valluvanad followed the new trend initiated by Cherussery in their poems. The Adhyathmaramayanam Kilippattu and Mahabharatham Kilippattu written by Ezhuthachan and Jnanappana written by Poonthanam are also included in the earliest form of Modern Malayalam.

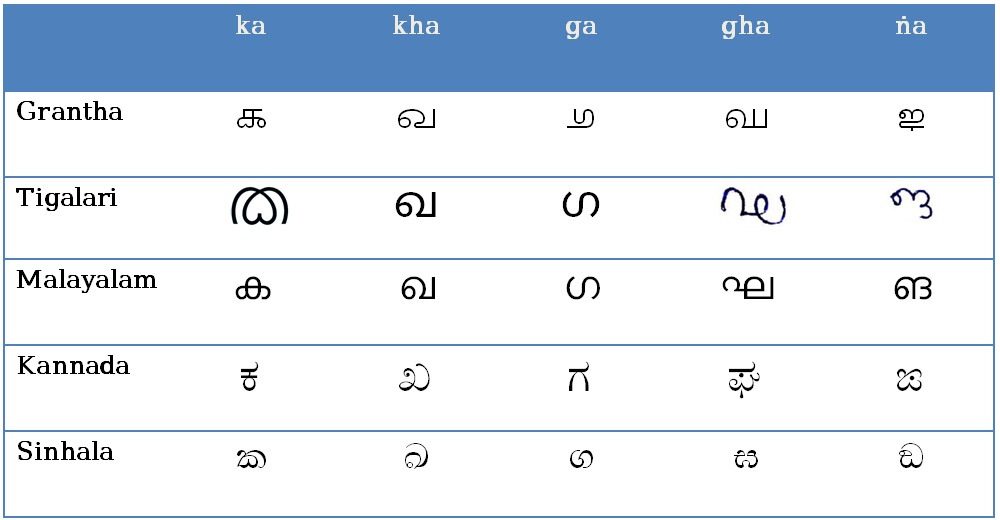
Grantha, Tigalari, and Malayalam scripts

It is Thunchaththu Ezhuthachan who is also credited with the development of Malayalam script into the current form through the intermixing and modification of the erstwhile scripts of Vatteluttu, Kolezhuthu, and Grantha script, which were used to write the inscriptions and literary works of Old and Middle Malayalam. He further eliminated excess and unnecessary letters from the modified script. Hence, Ezhuthachan is also known as The Father of modern Malayalam. The development of modern Malayalam script was also heavily influenced by the Tigalari script, which was used to write the Tulu language. The currently adopted Malayalam script is the only script in India that can be used to write any other language of India as it contain letters to denote both of the Voiced retroflex approximant (/ɻ/) (which is unique to Tamil and Malayalam in India) and the letters unique to Sanskrit (those are not there in the Tamil script). The language used in the Arabi Malayalam works of 16th-17th century CE is a mixture of Modern Malayalam and Arabic. They follow the syntax of modern Malayalam, though written in a modified form of Arabic script, which is known as Arabi Malayalam script.

Kunchan Nambiar introduced a new literary form called Thullal, and Unnayi Variyar introduced reforms in Attakkatha literature. Modern literary movements in Malayalam literature began in the late 19th century with the rise of the famous Modern Triumvirate consisting of Kumaran Asan, Ulloor S. Parameswara Iyer and Vallathol Narayana Menon. The printing, prose literature, and Malayalam journalism, developed after the latter-half of the 18th century CE. In the second half of the 20th century, Jnanpith winning poets and writers like G. Sankara Kurup, S. K. Pottekkatt, Thakazhi Sivasankara Pillai, Edasseri Govindan Nair, M. T. Vasudevan Nair, O. N. V. Kurup, and Akkitham Achuthan Namboothiri, had made valuable contributions to the modern Malayalam literature. Later, writers like O. V. Vijayan, Kamaladas, M. Mukundan, Arundhati Roy, Vaikom Muhammed Basheer, have gained international recognition. Malayalam has also borrowed a lot of its words from various foreign languages, mainly from the Semitic languages including Arabic, and the European languages including Dutch and Portuguese, due to the long heritage of Indian Ocean trade and the Portuguese-Dutch colonisation in the Malabar Coast.

Examples of vocabulary from various origins
| Word | Original word | Language of origin | Meaning |
|---|---|---|---|
| കത്ത് (Kattŭ) | Khaṭ | Arabic | letter |
| ജനാല or ജനൽ (Jaṉāla or Jaṉal) | Janela | Portuguese | window |
| കക്കൂസ് (Kakkūsŭ) | Kakhuis | Early Modern Dutch | toilet |

== Old Malayalam ==
=== Folk Songs ===
Folk songs are the oldest literary form in Malayalam. They were just oral songs. Many of them were related to agricultural activities, including Pulayar Pattu, Pulluvan Pattu, Njattu Pattu, Koythu Pattu, etc. Other Ballads of Folk Song period include the Vadakkan Pattukal (Northern songs) in North Malabar region and the Thekkan Pattukal (Southern songs) in Southern Travancore. Some of the earliest Mappila songs (Muslim songs) were also folk songs. For the first 600 years of the Malayalam calendar, Malayalam literature remained in a preliminary stage. During this time, Malayalam literature consisted mainly of various genres of songs (Pattu). Prominent were songs praising the goddesses of the land, ballads of brave warriors, songs related to the work of a particular caste and songs intended just for entertainment. Bhadrakali pattu, thottam pattu, Mappila pattu, mavaratham pattu, sasthanga pattu, nizhalkoothu pattu, sarpa pattu, sastham pattu, thiyyattu pattu, pulluvar pattu, mannar pattu, panar pattu, krishi pattu, thamburan pattu, pada pattu, villadichan pattu, onappattu, kummi and lullaby were some of the major subgenres. These names were not used historically, but are used in modern times to describe the song genres of that time.

=== Ramacharitham ===
Ramacharitham is a collection of poems written at the end of the preliminary stage. It is the oldest Malayalam book available, with a possible exception of Thirunizhalmala. The collection has 1,814 poems in it. Ramacharitham mainly consists of stories from the Yuddha Kanda of the Ramayana. It was written by a poet with the pen name Cheeramakavi who, according to poet Ulloor S Parameswara Iyer, was Sree Veerarama Varman, a king of southern Kerala from AD 1195 to 1208. However the claim that it was written in Southern Kerala is expired on the basis of new discoveries. Other experts, like Chirakkal T Balakrishnan Nair, Dr. K.M. George, M. M. Purushothaman Nair, and P.V. Krishnan Nair, state that the origin of the book is in Kasaragod district in North Malabar region. They cite the use of certain words in the book and also the fact that the manuscript of the book was recovered from Nileshwaram in North Malabar. The influence of Ramacharitam is mostly seen in the contemporary literary works of Northern Kerala. The words used in Ramacharitam such as Nade (Mumbe), Innum (Iniyum), Ninna (Ninne), Chaaduka (Eriyuka) are special features of the dialect spoken in North Malabar (Kasaragod-Kannur region). Furthermore, the Thiruvananthapuram mentioned in Ramacharitham is not the Thiruvananthapuram in Southern Kerala. But it is Ananthapura Lake Temple of Kumbla in the northernmost Kasaragod district of Kerala. The word Thiru is used just by the meaning Honoured. Today it is widely accepted that Ramacharitham was written somewhere in North Malabar (most likely near Kasaragod). Ramacharitham is considered a book written during the formative years of Malayalam. According to Rev. Dr. Hermann Gundert, who compiled the first dictionary of the Malayalam language, Ramacharitham shows the ancient style of the Malayalam language.

== Middle Malayalam ==
=== Manipravalam ===
While the Pattu school flourished among certain sections of the society, the literature of the elite was composed in the curious mixture of Sanskrit and Malayalam which is referred to as Manipravalam, mani meaning ruby (Malayalam) and pravalam meaning coral (Sanskrit). Lilathilakam, a work on grammar and rhetoric, written in the last quarter of the 14th century discusses the relationship between Manipravalam and Pattu as poetic forms. It lays special emphasis on the types of words that blend harmoniously. It points out that the rules of Sanskrit prosody should be followed in Manipravalam poetry. This particular school of poetry was patronised by the upper classes, especially the Nambudiris. Dramatic performances given in Koothambalams, known by the names of Koothu and Koodiyattom, often used Sanskrit and Malayalam. In Koodiyattom, the clown (vidooshaka) is allowed to use Malayalam while the hero recites slokas in Sanskrit. Tholan, a legendary court poet in the period of the Kulasekhara kings, is believed to have started this practice.

The earliest of these works in the Manipravalam school is Vaisika Tantram written in the 13th century. It contains about 200 quatrains in Sanskrit metres and is in the form of professional advice given to a prostitute or courtesan by her mother. Each quatrain is composed with care and due weight is given to the rules of rhetoric. Several quatrains of this type are quoted in Lilathilakam by way of illustration for the several rules of grammar and rhetoric.

The most representative of the early Manipravalam works are the tales of courtesans (Achi Charitams) and the Message Poems (Sandesa Kavyas). Unniyachi Charitam, Unnichiruthevi Charitam and Unniyadi Charitam are examples of the former type which is known by the name champu. The Padya (verse) portion is in Sanskrit metres and the Gadya (prose) portion is mostly in Dravidian metres. Authorship of Unniyachi Charitam and Unnichiruthevi Charitam is not known and only a portion of the works is now available. Unniyadi Charitam, which also exists in a fragmented form, is supposed to be written by Damodara Chakkiar. The Sandesa Kavyas are an important poetic genre in Sanskrit, and on the model of Kalidasa's Meghadūta and Lakshmidasa's Sukasandesa, a number of message poems came to be written first in Manipravalam and later in pure Malayalam. The best known among these sandesas is perhaps Unnuneeli Sandesam written in the 14th century. The poem is written under the pen-name Amruthanilakshi, and some believe that it was written in 1362 CE. The exact identity of the author remains a mystery, but it is widely believed that one of the members of the Travancore Royal Family wrote it.

The next work to be mentioned is Ramakathapattu, as it is popularly known, though the author calls it Ramayanakavyam. The author is Ayyappilli Asan who lived sometime about 1400 CE at Auvatutura near Kovalam and whom P. K. Narayana Pillai, who discovered the full text of the book in 1965, calls "the Homer of Malayalam." Ramakathapattu contains 3163 songs in 279 Vrittas or parts.

=== Niranam poets ===
While the Manipravala poetry flourished as a diversion from the mainstream, the tradition set up by Cheeraman of Ramacharitamand the more enlightened among the anonymous folk poets was resumed and replenished by three writers commonly referred to as Niranam poets, being Madhava Panikkar, Sankara Panikkar and Rama Panikkar. They were influenced by the Bhakti movement. The Bhakti school was thus revived, and in the place of the excessive sensuality and eroticism of the Manipravalam poets, the seriousness of the poetic vocation was reasserted by them. It is believed that they all belonged to the same Kannassa family and that Madhava Panikkar and Sankara Panikkar were the uncles of Rama Panikkar, the youngest of the three. Their most important work is Kannasa Ramayanam which is an important link between Ramacharitam, Ramakathapattu and Ezhuthachan's Adhyathmaramayanam. Ulloor has said that Rama Panikkar holds the same position in Malayalam literature that Edmund Spenser has in English literature.

=== Later Champus and Krishnagatha ===
The 15th century CE saw two paralleled movements in Malayalam literature: one spearheaded by the Manipravalam works, especially the Champus, and the other emanating from the Pattu school and adumbrated in Cherusseri's magnum opus, Krishnagatha (Song of Krishna). The language of the later Champus reads more like modern Malayalam than that of the earlier Champus and Sandesa Kavyas. Champus were mostly works of satire and hyperbole was a regular feature of it. The greatest Champus of the 15th century is Punam Nambudiri's Ramayanam which uses Puranic themes and episodes unlike the 14th century Champus which were tales of the courtesans. Punam was a court poet of the Zamorin of Calicut. Punam also wrote a Bharatam Champoo. There are also many others, the authorship of which is ascribed to him. The later Champus came to be used for dramatic oral narration by performing artists in their Koothu and Patakam. Mahishamangalam (or Mazhamangalam) Narayanan Nambudiri who lived in the 16th century is the author of some of the best Champus of all time. The most widely known of these is Naishadham followed by Rajaratnavaliyam and Kodia Viraham. Chandrotsavam, whose authorship is unknown, is a long narrative poem written in Manipravalam.

The elitist Manipravala Champu school disappeared by the end of the 16th century. The average readers without much grounding in Sanskrit had their favourite poems and poets in the so-called Pattu school. With the writing of Krishnagatha by Cherusseri, the validity of the use of spoken Malayalam for literary purposes received its ultimate justification. Unlike the language of Ramacharitam and the works of the Niranam poets, the language of Krishnagatha marks the culmination of a stage of evolution. There is some dispute about the author's name and his identity. Some scholars are of opinion that he was the same as the Punam Nambudiri of the Champus. It is widely believed that Cherusseri lived in the 15th century CE and was the court poet of Udayavarma of Kolathunadu.

=== Arabi Malayalam ===
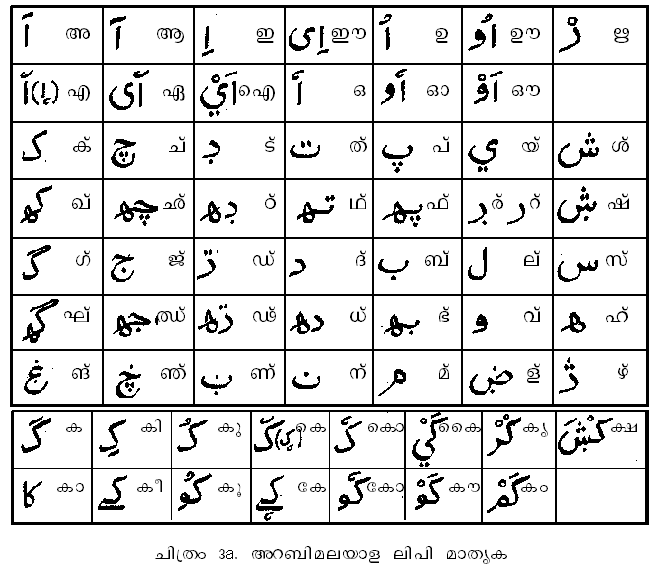
Arabi Malayalam alphabet with Malayalam alphabet correspondences

The Arabi Malayalam (also called Mappila Malayalam and Moplah Malayalam) was the traditional Dravidian language of the Mappila Muslim community in Malabar Coast. The poets like Moyinkutty Vaidyar and Pulikkottil Hyder have made notable contributions to the Mappila songs, which is a genre of the Arabi Malayalam literature. The Arabi Malayalam script, otherwise known as the Ponnani script, is a writing system - a variant form of the Arabic script with special orthographic features - which was developed during the early medieval period and used to write Arabi Malayalam until the early 20th century CE. Though the script originated and developed in Kerala, today it is predominantly used in Malaysia and Singapore by the migrant Muslim community.

== Evolution of Modern Malayalam ==
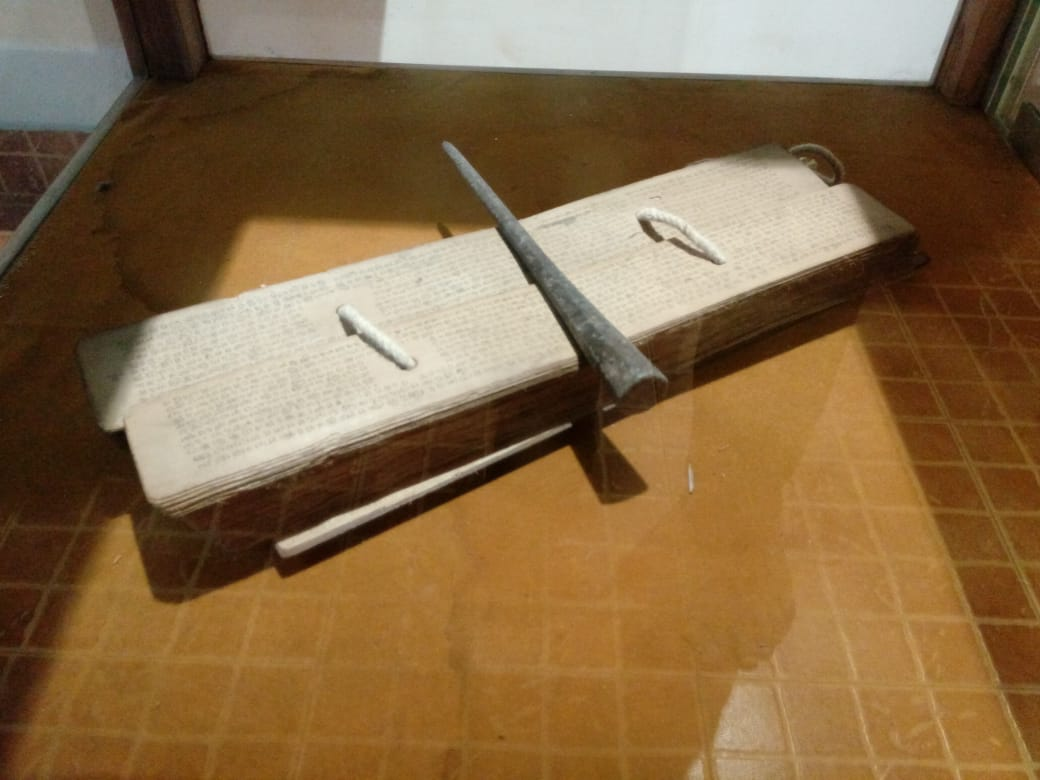
Copy of Ezhuthachan's stylus and Adhyatma Ramayanam preserved at Thunchan Parambu, Tirur

The Middle Malayalam (Madhyakaala Malayalam) was succeeded by Modern Malayalam (Aadhunika Malayalam) by the 15th century CE. The poem Krishnagatha written by Cherusseri Namboothiri, who was the court poet of the king Udaya Varman Kolathiri (1446 – 1475) of Kolathunadu, is written in modern Malayalam. The language used in Krishnagatha is the modern spoken form of Malayalam. During the 16th century CE, Thunchaththu Ezhuthachan from the Kingdom of Tanur and Poonthanam Nambudiri from the Kingdom of Valluvanad followed the new trend initiated by Cherussery in their poems. The Adhyathmaramayanam Kilippattu and Mahabharatham Kilippattu written by Ezhuthachan and Jnanappana written by Poonthanam are also included in the earliest form of Modern Malayalam.

It is Thunchaththu Ezhuthachan who is also credited with the development of Malayalam script into the current form through the intermixing and modification of the erstwhile scripts of Vatteluttu, Kolezhuthu, and Grantha script, which were used to write the inscriptions and literary works of Old and Middle Malayalam. He further eliminated excess and unnecessary letters from the modified script. Hence, Ezhuthachan is also known as The Father of modern Malayalam. The development of modern Malayalam script was also heavily influenced by the Tigalari script, which was used to write the Tulu language, due to the influence of Tuluva Brahmins in Kerala. The language used in the Arabi Malayalam works of 16th-17th century CE is a mixture of Modern Malayalam and Arabic. They follow the syntax of modern Malayalam, though written in a modified form of Arabic script, which is known as Arabi Malayalam script.

P. Shangunny Menon ascribes the authorship of the medieval work Keralolpathi, which describes the Parashurama legend and the departure of the final Cheraman Perumal king to Mecca, to Thunchaththu Ramanujan Ezhuthachan. The currently adopted Malayalam script, adopted by Ezhuthachan can be used to write any other language of India as it contain letters to denote both of the Voiced retroflex approximant (/ɻ/) (which is unique to Dravidian languages in India) and the letters unique to Sanskrit (those are not there in the Tamil script).

== Modern Malayalam ==
=== Bhakti era ===
The Thunchath Ezhuthachan Malayalam University is situated at Thunchan Parambu, Tirur, Malappuram

Thunchaththu Ezhuthachan

Malayalam literature passed through a tremendous process of development in the 15th and 16th centuries. Cherusseri's Krishnagatha bore witness to the evolution of modern Malayalam language as a proper medium for serious poetic communication. Alongside this, there flourished numerous Sanskrit poets who were very active during this period. The greatest of them was Melpathur Narayana Bhattathiri (1559–1665), the author of Narayaniyam. The most significant development of the time took place in the field of Malayalam poetry. Thunchaththu Ramanujan Ezhuthachan wrote his two great epics Adhyathmaramayanam and Srimahabharatam and two shorter pieces, Irupathinalu Vrittam and Harinama Kirtanam and thereby revolutionised Malayalam language and literature at once. Ezhuthachan refined the style of Malayalam language and it was during his period that Malayalam literature attained its individuality and Malayalam became a fully fledged independent language. Today he is known as the father of Malayalam language and its literature. The Kilippattu form he adopted in Ramayanam and Bharatam may be a pointer to his recognition of the importance of sound effect in poetry. Ezhuthachan is perhaps the greatest spokesman of the Bhakti movement in Malayalam but he is more than a writer of devotional hymns. K. Ayyappa Paniker has noted that "the transition from Cherrusseri to Ezhuthachan marks the triumph of modernism over medievalism." Another important poet of this period was Poonthanam Nambudiri (1547–1640). His chief poems are Jnanappana (The Song of Divine Wisdom), Bhasha Karnamritam and Kumaraharanam or Santanagopalam Pana.

=== Performance arts ===
The 16th century also saw the writing of some dramatic works in Manipravalam and pure Malayalam, Bharatavakyam, often described as a choral narration, is a work in Manipravalam which was used for stage performance. The main development in the cultural field in Kerala in the 17th century was the growth of a new form of visual art called Kathakali, which brought into being a new genre of poetry called Attakkatha consisting of the libretto used for a Kathakali performance. The origins of aattakatha literature dates back to the 12th century and it emerged as a literary genre in the 17th century. The earliest of the aattakathas is believed to be a cycle of eight Ramayana stories (collectively known as Ramanattam), composed by Kottarakkara Tampuran and about whose date there is an ongoing controversy. Next in importance are the works of Kottayathu Tampuran whose period is about the middle of the seventeenth century. Since the four aattakathas he wrote Bakavadham, Kalyanasaugandhikam, Kirmeeravadham and Kalakeyavadham punctiliously conform to the strict rules of Kathakali, they are particularly favoured by orthodox artistes and their patrons. Another poet of this category is Irayimman Thampi (1783–1863). Unnayi Variyar's Nalacharitham Aattakatha is one of the most famous works in this genre. Margamkali was the form of ritual and entertainment among the Syrian Christians corresponding to the Sanghakali of the Brahmins. Margamkalippattu is the song for this performance depicting the story of Thomas the Apostle. This was one of the numerous pieces of Christian literature that must have gained currency in the 16th and 17th centuries.

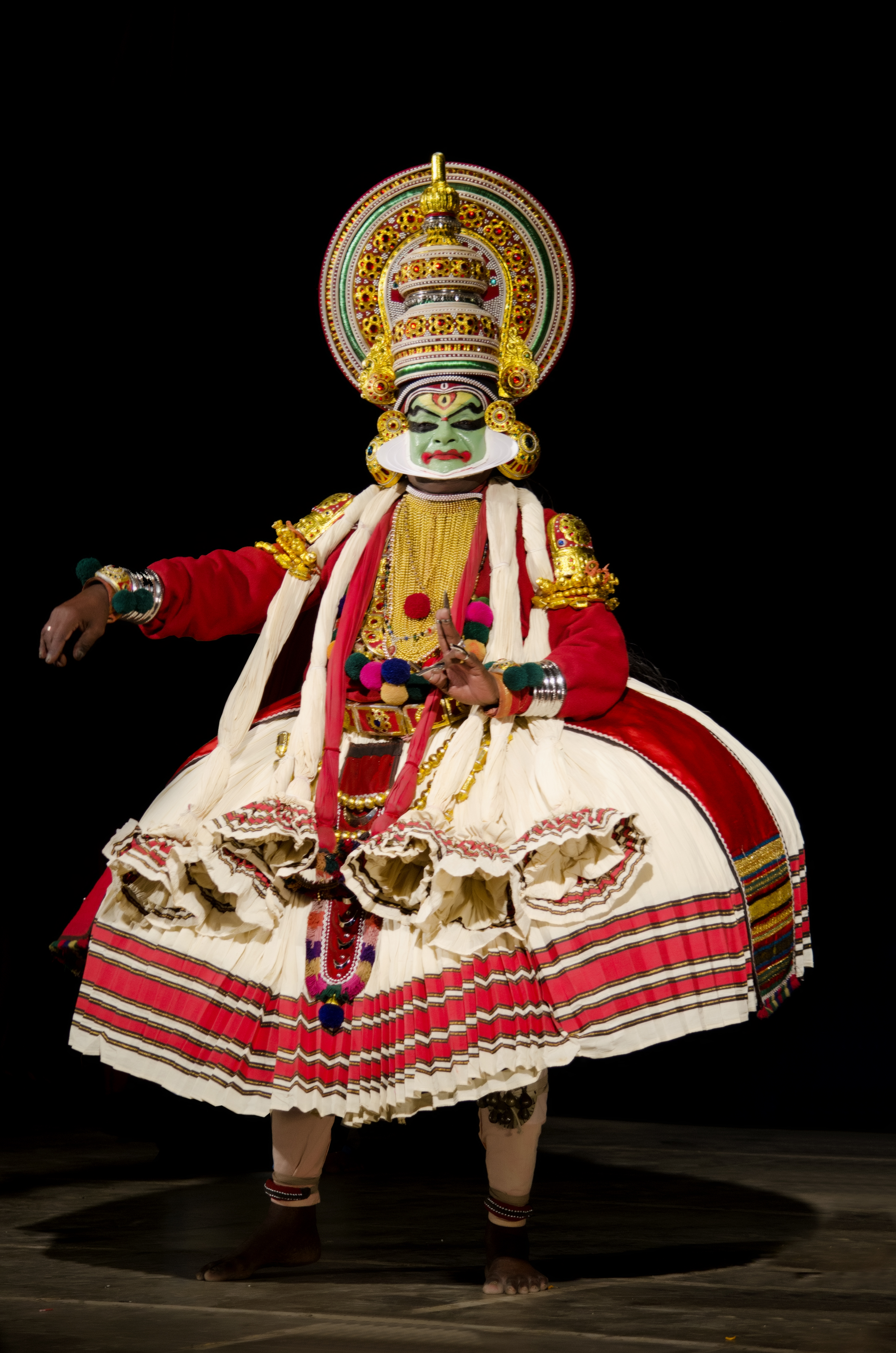
Kathakali

In the court of Travancore king Marthanda Varma (1706–1758) and his successor Dharma Raja Kartika Tirunal Rama Varma, there flourished a number of poets distinguished in several ways. Ramapurathu Warrier (1703–1753), the author of Kuchela Vrittam Vanchippattu, was one of them. The Vanchippattu or Boat song is a poetic form of folk origin composed entirely in the Dravidian metre nathonnata. Kunchan Nambiar (1705–1770), the founder of Thullal and its rich literature, is often considered as the master of Malayalam satirist poetry. Born in Killikkurussimangalam, he spent his boyhood at Kudamalur and youth at Ambalappuzha. 1748 he moved to the court of Marthanda Varma and later to the court of his successor Dharma Raja. The word "Thullal" literally means "dance", but under this name Nambiar devised a new style of verse narration with a little background music and dance-like swinging movement to wean the people away from the Chakkiyar Koothu, which was the art form popular till then. He used pure Malayalam as opposed to the stylised and Sanskritised Malayalam language of Chakkiyar Koothu. He also adopted many elements from Padayani and Kolam Thullal and certain local folk arts. There are three kinds of Tullal distinguished on the basis of the performer's costume and the style of rendering, viz., Ottan, Sitankan and Parayan. Dravidian metres are used throughout although there is a quatrain in a Sanskrit metre.

=== Prose literature ===
There was a great lull in the field of literary creation in Malayalam for nearly a century after the death of Kunchan Nambiar. There was however a consistent and steady development of prose at this time. The evolution of prose literature in the early centuries was a very slow process. In the wake of Bhashakautaliyam several translations began to appear in the fifteenth and sixteenth centuries. The prose of Attaprakarams was meant to aid the Chakiyars in learning the art of Koodiyattom. Doothavakyam (14th century CE) is one of the earliest of these works. 15th century Malayalam prose is represented by Brahmanda Puranam, a summary of the original in Sanskrit. A large number of prose works appeared during this period, most of which are either narrative based on puranas and religious works in Sanskrit or commentaries on similar works. With the starting of the first printing presses in the 16th century by Christian missionaries, prose literature received a great boost. Several regional versions of Keralolpathi, tracing the beginnings of Kerala history, began to appear in the 18th century. Paremmakkal Thoma Kathanar (1737–1799) wrote the first travelogue in Malayalam, Varthamanapustakam (Book of News). The works of Christian missionaries like Arnos Patiri (Johann Ernst Hanxleden), 1699–1732) and Paulinose Patiri (John Philip Wesdin, 1748–1806) also led to a widening of the range of topics and themes in Malayalam literature.

=== Venmani school ===
The third quarter of the nineteenth century bore witness to the rise of a new school of poets devoted to the observation of life around them and the use of pure Malayalam (Pachcha Malayalam). The major poets of the Venmani school were Venmani Achhan Nambudiripad (1817–1891), Venmani Mahan Nambudiripad (1844–1893), Poonthottam Achhan Nambudiri (1821–1865), Poonthottam Mahan Nambudiri (1857–1896) and the members of the Kodungallur Kovilakam (Royal Family) such as Kodungallur Kunjikkuttan Thampuran. The style of these poets became quite popular for a while and influenced even others who were not members of the group like Velutheri Kesavan Vaidyar (1839–1897) and Perunlli Krishnan Vaidyan (1863–1894). The Venmani school pioneered a style of poetry that was associated with common day themes, and the use of pure Malayalam rather than Sanskrit. The poetry was therefore easily understood by the common man. The works were known for its humour, wit, and lyrical metre.

== Modern prose literature ==
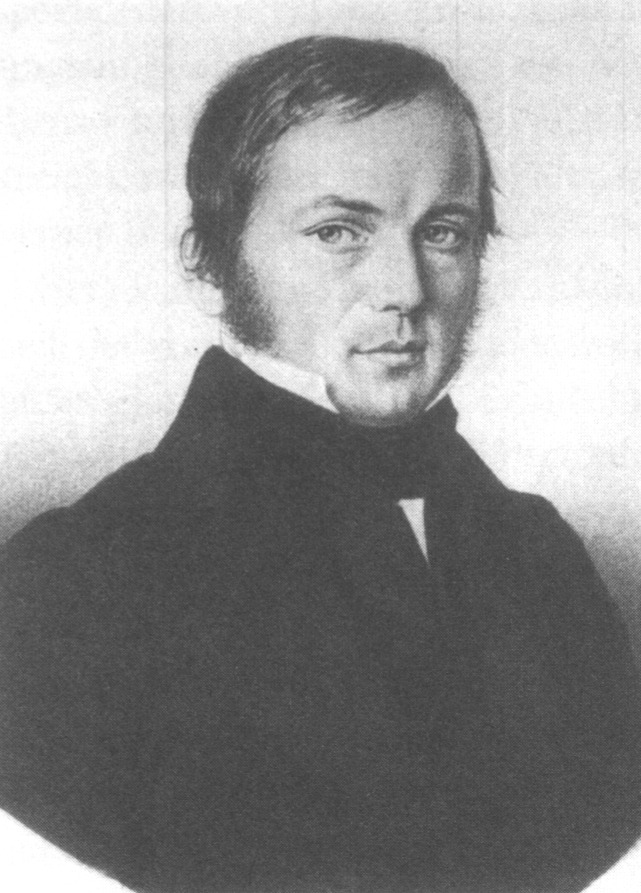
Herman Gundert

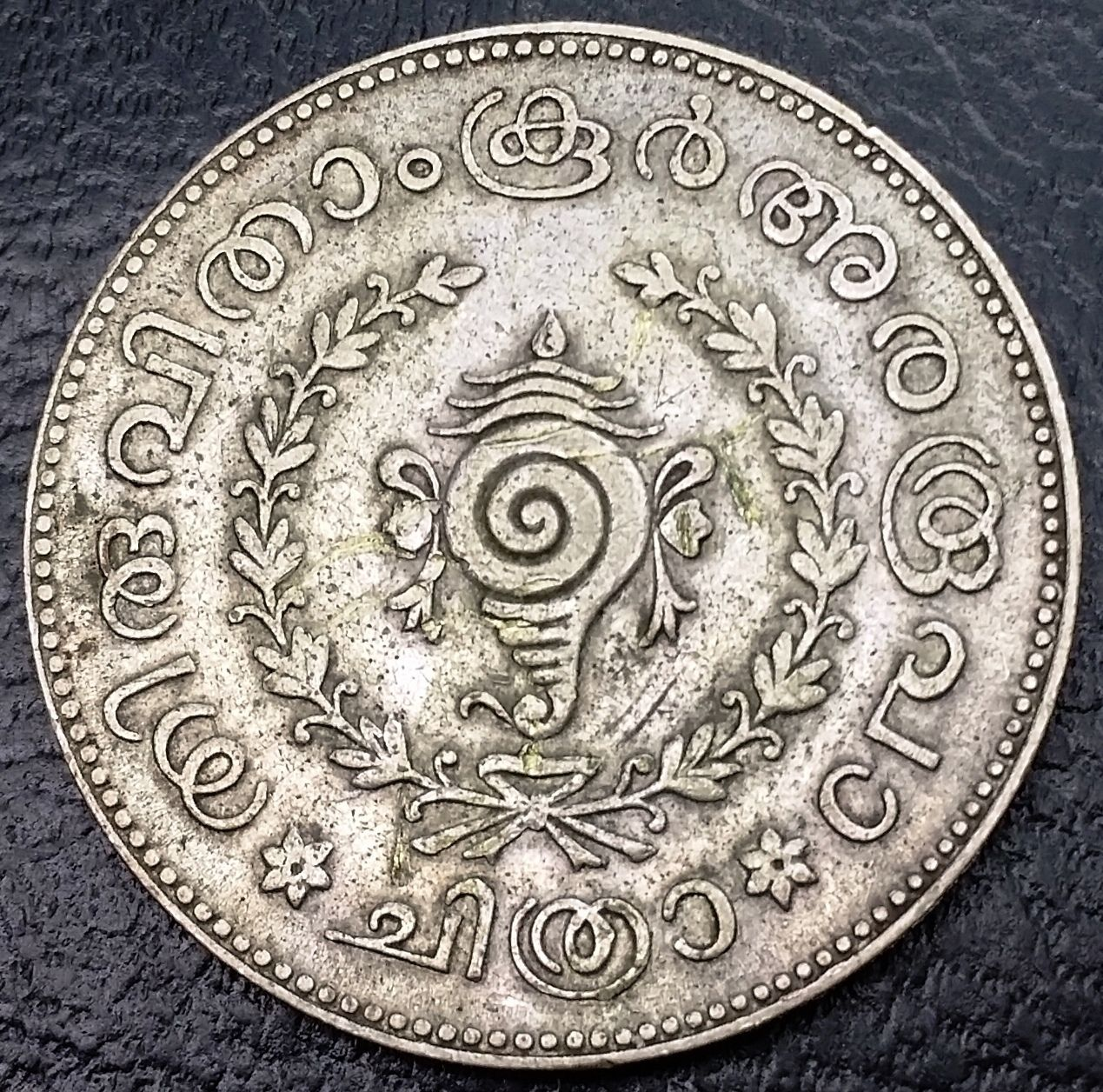
Malayalam letters on old Travancore Rupee coin. The establishment of the Kingdom of Travancore was a turning point in the field of Malayalam literature.

Contemporary Malayalam poetry deals with social, political, and economic life context. The tendency of the modern poetry is often towards political radicalism. Nineteenth century was not a very creative period for Malayalam literature (except towards the end) from the point of view of imaginative writing. The modern Malayalam grammar is based on the book Kerala Panineeyam written by A. R. Raja Raja Varma in the late 19th century CE. But the foundations for the great renaissance that began at the end of the century were laid during this period. The establishment of colleges for imparting English education, the translation of the Bible and other religious works, the compilation of dictionaries and grammars, the formation of the text book committee, the growth of printing presses, the starting of newspapers and periodicals, the introduction of science and technology, the beginning of industrialisation and the awakening of social and political consciousness: these constitute the giant strides towards modernisation. Like his predecessors Swathi Thirunal and Uthram Thirunal, Ayilyam Thirunal (1832–1880) and Visakham Thirunal (1837–1885) were great patrons of letters and were themselves talented writers. Christian missionaries Benjamin Bailey (1805–1871), Joseph Peet, Richard Collins and George Mathen (1819–1870) were responsible for many works on Malayalam language based on western models. Perhaps the most important of these missionaries was Herman Gundert (1814–1893). Born in Stuttgart in Germany and educated at Tübingen and Switzerland, Gundert came to India in 1836. He wrote over twenty books in Malayalam, the most important of which are A Malayalam-English Dictionary, A Grammar of Malayalam, Keralappazhama and Pazhamcholmala. The first authoritative grammar of Malayalam was also Gundert's contribution (1851). This led to the production of a number of grammatical works in Malayalam. Vaikkam Patchu Moothathu (1814–1883) published his Grammar of Malayalam in 1876, Kerala Kaumudi by Kovunni Nedungadi (1831–1889) came out in 1878. This was soon followed by the first history of the language by P. Govinda Pillai (1849–1897) published in 1881. The first work on rhetoric in Malayalam on the European model was brought out by Father Gerad under the title Alankara Sastram in the same year. By the end of the 19th century two different traditions could be clearly distinguished in Malayalam literature: the western school and the oriental or traditionalist school. Writers such as Kerala Varma Valiya Koyithampuran represent the confluence of these two major traditions. His major works include Mayurasandesam (Peacock Message) and the translations of Kalidasa's Abhijñānaśākuntalam (which got him the title of Kerala Kalidasa), and of Von Limburg Brower's Akbar. Meanwhile, many literary magazines were established to encourage all kinds of writers and writings, such as C. P. Achutha Menon's Vidyavinodini, Kandathil Varghese Mappillai's Bhashaposhini and Appan Thampuran's Rasikaranjini.

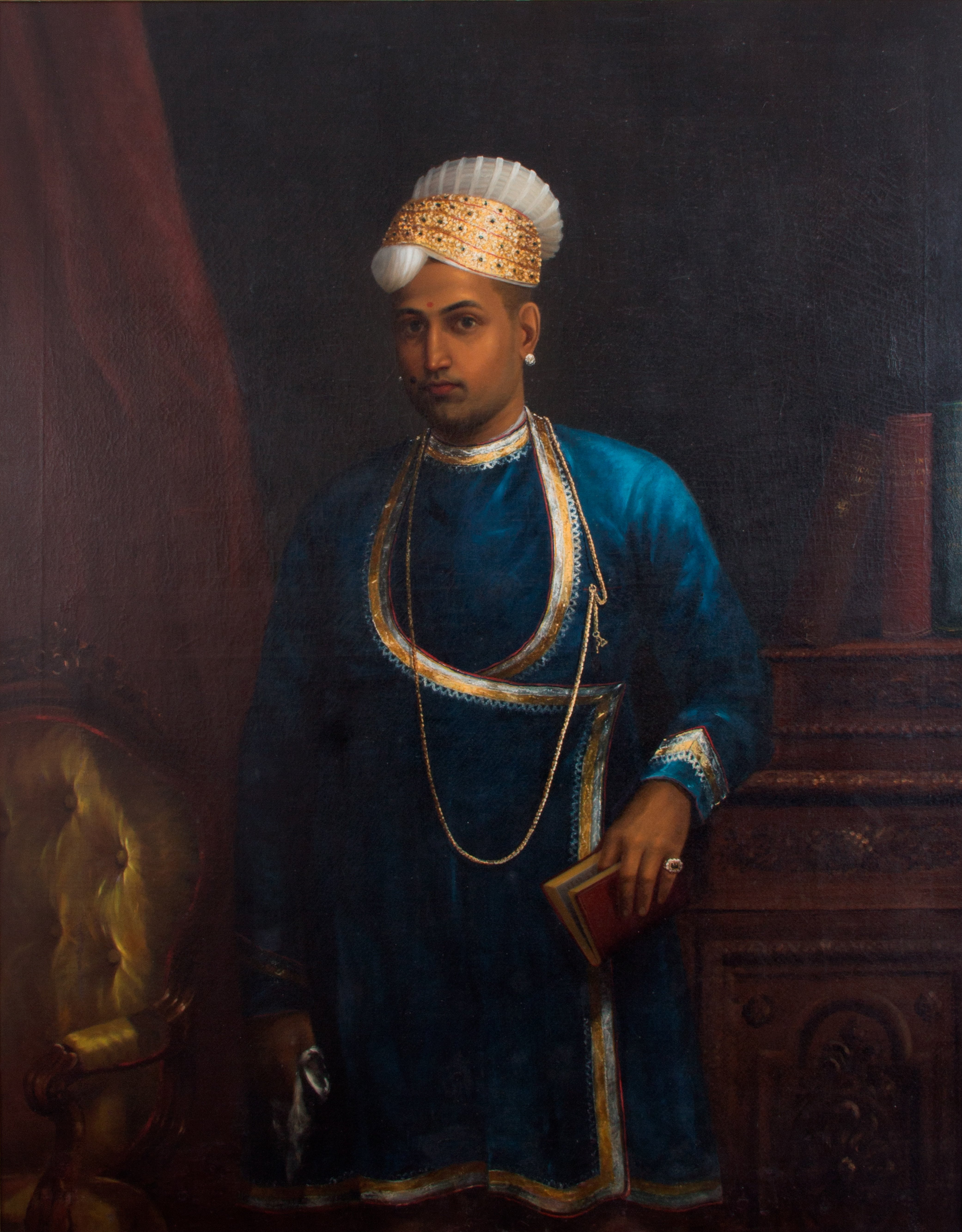
Kerala Varma Valiya Koyithampuran

In the wake of Kerala Varma's translation of Abhijñānaśākuntalam, several attempts were made to translate numerous plays from Sanskrit and English into Malayalam. These plays were seldom acted. The stage conditions of those days were crude and unfit to project a performance. As if irritated by this imitation plays of low quality, P. Rama Kurup wrote Chakki Chankaram (1893). Kerala Varma's nephew A. R. Raja Raja Varma went a step further than his uncle in the promotion of a synthesis between the different trends current in the literature of his time. A professor in the His Highness Maharaja's University College, Thiruvananthapuram, he had to modernise the process of teaching Malayalam language and literature; this made him write books on grammar and rhetoric (which earned him the title of Kerala Panini) and eventually prepare the ground for an enlightened renaissance in Malayalam poetry and literary criticism. A close associate of both Kerala Varma and Raja Raja Varma, K. C. Kesava Pillai wrote Kesaviyam (a mahakavya) and a number of attakkathas. Azhakathu Padmanabha Kurup (1869–1932: author of Ramachandravilasam), Pandalam Kerala Varma (1879–1919: author of Rukmangatha Charitam), Kattakkayam Cherian Mappila (1859 – 1937: author of Sri Yesu Vijayam), Ulloor S. Parameswara Iyer (1877–1949 : author of Umakeralam) and Vallathol Narayana Menon (1879–1958: author of Chitrayogam), all paid their obeisance to this neoclassicist trend.

The developments in prose at this time were very significant, Vengayil Kunhiraman Nayanar (1861–1895), more famous under his pseudonym Kesari, was one of the first to explore the essay form in Malayalam. He was closely associated with periodicals like Kerala Chandrika (started in 1879 at Thiruvananthapuram), Kerala Patrika (started in 1884 by C. Kunhiraman Menon (1854–1936) and Appu Nedungadi (1866–1934) at Kozhikode), Kerala Sanchari (after 1898 under the editorship of Murkoth Kumaran) and the English Journal Malabar Spectator. His Vasanavikriti is considered by historians and literary experts as the first short story in Malayalam literature. It was published in Vidyavinodini in 1891. Along with Nayanar, the pioneers of short stories in Malayalam were Oduvil Kunhikrishna Menon, C. S. Gopala Panicker, Ambadi Narayana Poduval, Chenkulath Cheriya Kunhirama Menon (M. R. K. C.) and Moorkoth Kumaran. Fulmoni Ennum Koruna Ennum Peraya Randu Sthreekalude Katha (Phulmōni ennuṁ kōruṇa ennuṁ pērāya ranṭu strīkaḷuṭe katha), a translation of Hana Catherine Mullens's Bengali novel Fulmoni O Korunar Biboron by Rev. Joseph Peet, is believed to be the first novel printed and released in Malayalam (1858). Ghathakawadham (Ghātakavadhaṁ, 1877) by Rev. Richard Collins was the first novel printed and published in Malayalam with a story based in Kerala and around Malayalis.

The first novel conceived and published in Malayalam was Appu Nedungadi's Kundalatha (1887). Though Kundalatha is not considered a major novel, it gets the pride of place as the first work in the language having the basic characteristics of a novel. O. Chandhu Menon's Indulekha was the first major novel in Malayalam language. It was a landmark in the history of Malayalam literature and initiated the novel as a new flourishing genre. The title refers to the main character in this novel, a beautiful, well educated Nair lady of 18 years. C. V. Raman Pillai's Marthandavarma (1891) had many distinctions: it was the first historical novel in any South Indian languages, first novel from Travancore, first Malayalam novel to be a part of a trilogy and the first Malayalam novel to have a masculine title. Marthandavarma was completed even before Indulekha but could not be published until 1891 owing to lack of finance. The novel recounted the history of Venad (Travancore) during the final period of Rajah Rama Varma's reign and subsequently to the accession of Marthanda Varma. The novel had a film adaptation of the same name in 1933 and was the first Malayalam novel to be adapted into film. During the early 20th century, Malayalam received outstanding novels, either as translations or adaptations of Western literature. The post-independence period saw a fresh start in the history of longer fiction in Malayalam as in many other Indian languages, parallel to the evolution of post-world war fiction in other parts of the world. It was both a break and a continuation. P. Kesava Dev, who was a Communist in the thirties and forties turned away from diehard ideologies and wrote a symbolic novel called Arku Vendi? (For Whose Sake?) in 1950, challenging the philosophy of Stalinist liquidation of political enemies. It had a special significance in the context of the 'Calcutta thesis'. After portraying the class struggle of farm labourers in Randidangazhi (Two Measures) in 1949, Thakazhi Sivasankara Pillai turned away from party politics and produced a moving romance in Chemmeen (Shrimps) in 1956. For S. K. Pottekkatt and Vaikom Muhammad Basheer, who had not dabbled in politics, the continuity is marked in the former's Vishakanyaka (Poison Maid, 1948) and the latter's Ntuppuppakkoranendarnnu (My Grandpa had an Elephant, 1951). The non-political social or domestic novel was championed by P. C. Kuttikrishnan (Uroob) with his Ummachu (1955) and Sundarikalum Sundaranmarum (Men and Women of Charm, 1958). In 1957 Basheer's Pathummayude Aadu (Pathumma's Goat) brought in a new kind of prose tale, which perhaps only Basheer could handle with dexterity. The fifties thus mark the evolution of a new kind of fiction, which had its impact on the short stories as well. This was the auspicious moment for the entry of M. T. Vasudevan Nair and T. Padmanabhan upon the scene. Front runners in the post-modern trend include Kakkanadan, O. V. Vijayan, E. Harikumar, M. Mukundan and Anand. The travelogues written by S. K. Pottekkatt were turning point in the travelogue literature. Prominent literary critics of twentieth century include Kuttikrishna Marar.

In the second half of the 20th century, Jnanpith winning poets and writers like G. Sankara Kurup, S. K. Pottekkatt, Thakazhi Sivasankara Pillai, Edasseri Govindan Nair, M. T. Vasudevan Nair, O. N. V. Kurup, and Akkitham Achuthan Namboothiri, had made valuable contributions to the modern Malayalam literature. Later, writers like O. V. Vijayan, Kamaladas, M. Mukundan, Arundhati Roy, Vaikom Muhammed Basheer, have gained international recognition. Kerala has the highest media exposure in India with newspapers publishing in nine languages, mainly English and Malayalam.

== Early prose literature ==
List of early prose literature in the 19th century.

=== Allegories ===
| Title | Author | Year | Make | Other notes |
|---|---|---|---|---|
| Sanchariyude Prayanam (സഞ്ചാരിയുടെ പ്രയാണം – Sancāriyuṭe Pṟayāṇaṁ) | Rev. C. Muller; Rev. P. Chandran | 1846 | Translation | More Translation of The Pilgrim's Progress (English, 1674) by John Bunyan |
| Paradeshi Mokshayathra (പരദേശി മോക്ഷയാത്ര – Paradēśi Mōkṣayātṟa) | Rev. K. Koshy; Rev. Joseph Peet | 1844 | Translation | More Translation of The Pilgrim's Progress (English, 1677) by John Bunyan; First repeated translation of an English literature to Malayalam |
| Thirupporattam (തിരുപ്പോരാട്ടം – Tiruppōrāṭṭaṁ) | Archdeacon. K. Koshy | 1868 | Translation | More Translation of The Holy War (English, 1682) by John Bunyan |

=== Plays ===
Writers like Edasseri Govindan Nair, N. N. Pillai, Cherukad, Thoppil Bhasi, Kavalam Narayana Panicker have contributed much to Malayalam drama.

| Title | Author | Year | Make | Other notes |
|---|---|---|---|---|
| Bashashankunthalam (ഭാഷാശാകുന്തളം – Bhaṣāśākuntaḷaṁ) | Ayilyam Thirunal Rama Varma | 1850–1860 | Translation | More Translation of Abhijnanasakuntalam (Sanskrit ,1000 B.C-0400) by Kalidasa; The first prose translation to Malayalam from Sanskrit literature |
| Almarattam (ആൾമാറാട്ടം – Āḷmāṟāṭṭaṁ) | Kalloor Umman Philipose | 1866 | Translation | More Translation of The Comedy of Errors (1594–1595) by William Shakespeare |
| Kamakshee Charitham (കാമാക്ഷീചരിതം – Kāmākṣīcaritaṁ) | K. Chidambara Wadhyar | 1880–1885 | Translation | More Translation of Tales from Shakespeare: As You Like It by Mary Lamb, (Children's Story Adaptation-English,1807) As You Like It (1599–1600) by William Shakespeare |
| Varshakala Katha (വൎഷകാലകഥ – Varṣakāla Katha) | K. Chidambara Wadhyar | 1880–1885 | Translation | More Translation of Tales from Shakespeare: The Winter's Tale by Mary Lamb, (Children's Story Adaptation-English,1807) The Winter's Tale (1623) by William Shakespeare |

=== Stories ===
| Title | Author | Year | Make | Other notes |
|---|---|---|---|---|
| Oru Kuttiyude Maranam (ഒരു കുട്ടിയുടെ മരണം – Oru Kuṭṭiyuṭe Maraṇaṁ) | <Anonymous Writer> | 1847 | Original | More Published in the monthly periodical Rajyasamacharam December edition |
| Vishathinu Marunnu (വിഷത്തിന് മരുന്ന് – Viṣattinŭ Marunnŭ) | <Anonymous Writer> | 1848 | Original | More Published in the monthly periodical Rajyasamacharam February edition |
| Anayum Thunnanum (ആനയും തുന്നനും – Āṉayuṁ Tunnaṉuṁ) | <Anonymous Writer> | 1849 | Original | More Published in the monthly periodical Jnananikshepam August edition |
| Meenakethanan or Meenakethana Charitham (മീനകേതനൻ or മീനകേതനചരിതം – Mīṉakētaṉan or Mīṉakētaṉacaritaṁ ) | Ayilyam Thirunal Rama Varma | 1850–1860 | Inspiration | More Inspired from 'The Story of the Prince Kamar-Ez-Zeman and the Princess Budoor', The Thousand And One Nights Vol II by Edward William Lane (English, 1839) which is a translation of Kitab Alf Laylah Wa-Laylah (Arabic, 1100–1200) |
| Jathibetham (ജാതിഭേദം – Jātibēdaṁ) | Archdeacon. K. Koshy | 1860 | Original | More Published in the monthly periodical Jnananikshepam August, September, November editions |
| Aayalkarane Konnavante Katha (അയൽക്കാരനെ കൊന്നവന്റെ കഥ – Ayalkārane Konnavanṯe Katha) | <Anonymous Writer> | 1873 | Original | More |
| Kallan (കല്ലൻ – Kallan) | <Anonymous Writer> | 1881 | Adaptation | More Published in the periodical Vidyavilasini |
| Pullelikunchu (പുല്ലേലിക്കുഞ്ചു – Pullēlikkuñcu) | Archdeacon. K. Koshy | 1882 | Original | More Sequel to ജാതിഭേദം (1860), First sequel in Malayalam prose literature Divided into three parts: Part One is a prequel ജാതിഭേദം (1860). Part Two has a plot with same characters of the prequel and some new characters in a new situation. Part Three is presented as a religious tract following incidents of Part Two. |
| Vasanavikrithi (വാസനാവികൃതി – Vāsanāvikr̥ti) | Vengayil Kunjiraman Nayanar | 1891 | Original | More Regarded as the first short-story of Malayalam literature |

=== Novels ===
| Title | Author | Year | Make | Other notes |
|---|---|---|---|---|
| Fulmoni Ennum Koruna Ennum Peraya Randu Sthreekalude Katha (ഫുൽമോനി എന്നും കോരുണ എന്നും പേരായ രണ്ടു സ്ത്രീകളുടെ കഥ – Phulmōni ennuṁ kōruṇa ennuṁ pērāya ranṭu strīkaḷuṭe katha) | Rev. Joseph Peet | 1858 | Translation | More First novel printed and released in Malayalam; First novel translated to Malayalam which was originally conceived in an Indian language Translation of The History of Phulmani and Karuna (English,1853) by Mrs. (Hana Catherine) Mullens which is a translation of ফুলমনি ও করুণার বিবরণ [Fulmoni O Korunar Biboron] (Bengali ,1852) by Mrs. (Hana Catherine) Mullens |
| Ghathakawadham (ഘാതകവധം – Ghātakavadhaṁ) | Rev. Richard Collins | 1877 | Translation | More First novel printed and published in Malayalam with a story based in Kerala and around Malayalees, First novel translated to Malayalam which was originally conceived in English; Translation of The Slayer Slain (English,1864–1866) by Mrs. (Frances) Richard Collins & Rev. Richard Collins |
| Pathminiyum Karunayum (പത്മിനിയും കരുണയും – Patmiṉiyuṁ karuṇayuṁ) | <Anonymous Writer> | 1884 | Translation | More First repeated translation of a novel to Malayalam; Translation of The History of Phulmani and Karuna (English,1853) by Mrs. (Hana Catherine) Mullens which is a translation of ফুলমনি ও করুণার বিবরণ [Fulmoni O Korunar Biboron] (Bengali ,1852) by Mrs. (Hana Catherine) |
| Kundalatha (കുന്ദലത – Kundalata) | Appu Nedungadi | 1887 | Original | More First novel conceived and published in Malayalam, first novel by a Malayalee Keralite, First novel from Malabar; First Malayalam novel to have a story outside Kerala and without Malayali characters |
| Indulekha (ഇന്ദുലേഖ – Indulēkha) | O. Chandumenon | 1889 | Original | More First social novel in Malayalam, first novel made in Malayalam with Malayali characters and a story based in Malabar, Kerala, |
| Indumathee Swayamvaram (ഇന്ദുമതീസ്വയംവരം – Indumatīsvayaṁvaraṁ) | Padinjare Kovilakathu Ammaman Raja | 1890 | Original | More |
| Meenakshi (മീനാക്ഷി – Mīṉākṣi) | C. Chathu Nair | 1890 | Original | More |
| Marthandavarma (മാർത്താണ്ഡവർമ്മ – Māṟttāṇḍavaṟmma) | C. V. Raman Pillai | 1891 | Original | More First Historical novel in Malayalam, Kerala and South India, First novel from Travancore; First Malayalam novel to be a part of a trilogy, First Malayalam novel to have a masculine title |
| Saraswatheevijayam (സരസ്വതീവിജയം – Sarasvatīvijayaṁ) | Potheri Kunjanbu | 1892 | Original | More |
| Parishkarapathi (പരിഷ്ക്കാരപ്പാതി – Pariṣkārappāti) | Kochuthomman Appothikari | 1892 | Original | More |
| Parangodee Parinayam (പറങ്ങോടീപരിണയം – Paṟaṅṅōṭīpariṇayaṁ) | Kizhakepattu Raman Menon | 1892 | Original | More First satirical novel in Malayalam |
| Sarada (ശാരദ – Śārada) | O. Chandumenon | 1892 | Original | More First novel foretold to have sequels in a trilogy |
| Lakshmeekeshavam (ലക്ഷ്മീകേശവം – Lakṣmīkēśavaṁ) | Komattil Padu Menon | 1892 | Original | More |
| Naluperiloruthan (നാലുപേരിലൊരുത്തൻ – Nālupēriloruttan) | C. Anthapayi | 1893 | Original | More |
| Chandrahasan (ചന്ദ്രഹാസൻ – Candrahāsan) | P. Krishnan Menon; T. K. Krishnan Menon; C. Govindan Eledam | 1893 | Translation | More |
| Akbar (അക്ബർ – Akbaṟ) | Kerala Varma Valiya Koi Thampuran | 1894 | Translation | More First Historical novel translated to Malayalam; Translation of Akbar (English,1879) by M. M which is a translation of Akbar (Dutch ,1872) by Dr. P.A.S van Limburg Brouwer |
| Kalyani (കല്യാണി – Kalyāṇi) | <Anonymous Writer> | 1896 | Original | More Published in Vidyāvinodini periodical |
| Sukumari (സുകുമാരി – Sukumāri) | Joseph Mooliyil | 1897 | Original | More |
| Saguna (സഗുണ – Saguṇa) | Joseph Mooliyil | 1898–1899 | Translation | More Translation of Saguna (English, 1896) by Kirubai Sathyanathan Ammal |
| Kamala (കമല – Kamala) | C. Krishnan Nair | 1899 | Translation | More Translation of Kamala (English, 1896) by Kirubai Sathyanathan Ammal |

=== Apologues ===
| Title | Author | Year | Make | Other notes |
|---|---|---|---|---|
| Rasselas (റാസലസ് – Ṟāsalas) | Pilo Paul | 1895 | Translation | More Translation of Rasselas or The History of Rasselas, Prince of Abissinia (English, 1759) by Samuel Johnson |
| Nandipa Deepika (നന്ദിപദീപിക – Nandipadīpika) | Kunji Kelu Nair | 1895 | Translation | More Translation of Rasselas or The History of Rasselas, Prince of Abissinia (English, 1759) by Samuel Johnson |
| Rasalelika (രസലേലിക – Rasalēlika) | Thatha Kanaran | 1898 | Translation | More Translation of Rasselas or The History of Rasselas, Prince of Abissinia (English, 1759) by Samuel Johnson |

== See also ==
- Indian literature
- List of Malayalam poets
- List of fiction writers in Malayalam
- Malayalam Literary Awards
- Arabi Malayalam
- Bible translations into Malayalam
- Malayalam (Unicode block)
- Malayalam Braille
- Women in Malayalam literature
