= Seevolli Narayanan Nambudiri =

Seevolli Narayanan Nambudiri (1868–1905) was a well-known Malayali poet of the Venmani style, who was also an Ayurvedic physician.

== Early life ==
Narayanan Nambudiri was born in 1868 in Seevolli Illam near Aluva. He learned Sanskrit including Grammar, Logic, Astrology and Ayurvedam (under Thaikkatt Mooss). Narayanan mastered Malayalam, Sanskrit, Tamil, Kannada and had a working knowledge of Tulu, Marathi and English. He also learned allopathy under a government doctor.

== Literary works ==
Narayanan Nambudiri's main works are Madana Kethana Charitham, a long but incomplete work on the model of Bhoothibhoosha Charitham by Venmani, Saaropadesa Dasakam, a work written when he was only 28, Oru Katha, Dathyooha Sandesam, a sarcastic lampoon of Kerala Varma's Mayoorasandesam, Insparsa Naatakam, Ghoshayaathra, a "Thullal" work. His devotional Slokams (verses) exhibit a high sense of humour and wit. They are the best examples of the rare phenomenon of humour, in devotional poetry. He has also written two poems in Sanskrit, Paarvathi Viraham and Devimaahaatmyam. The latter work closely follows and resembles the celebrated Narayaneeyam by Melpathur Narayana Bhattathiri.

== See also ==
- Malayalam Literature
- Venmani School
