= Venmani Vishnu Nambudiripad =

Indian poet

Venmani Vishnu Nambudiripad was an early 19th-century Malayalam poet belonging to the well known Venmani family. He was the uncle of the famous Venmani Achhan Nambudiripad. He was also involved in religious and philosophical pursuits. Some of his works include Ganapath Praathal, Raghuvamsam and Samsariyute Paaraavasyam.

== See also ==
- Venmani Illam
- Malayalam Literature
