= Venmani School =

School of poets involved in the Venmani Movement

The Venmani School of poets were involved in a movement in Malayalam Literature also known as the Venmani Movement. The style of poetry was pioneered by members of the Venmani Illam of Kodungalloor in the 19th century.

== Main members ==
The major poets of the Venmani school were Venmani Achhan Nambudiripad (1817-1891), Venmani Mahan Nambudiripad (1844-1893), Poonthottam Achhan Nambudiri (1821-1865), Poonthottam Mahan Nambudiri (1857-1896) and the members of the Kodungallur Kovilakam (Royal Family) such as Kodungallur Kunjikkuttan Thampuran. The style of these poets became quite popular for a while and influenced even others who were not members of the group like Velutheri Kesavan Vaidyar (1839-1897) and Perunlli Krishnan Vaidyan (1863-1894).

== Style of literature ==
The Venmani School pioneered a style of poetry that was associated with common day themes, and the use of pure Malayalam rather than Sanskrit. The poetry was therefore easily understood by the common man. The works were known for its humor, wit, and lyrical meter.

== See also ==
- Akavoor Narayanan, author of Venmani Prasthanam, a study on Venmani School.
- Malayalam Literature
- Malayalam
- Sanskrit
