= Sringapuram =

- Village
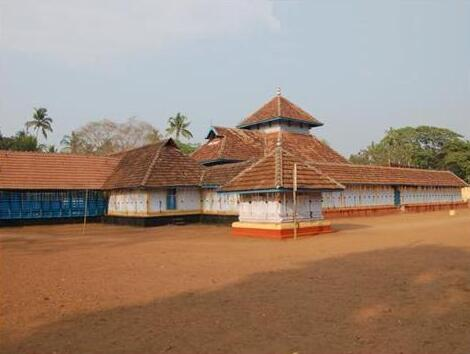
- Country: India
- State: Kerala
- Village: Methala

Government
  - Body: Methala Grama Panchayat
- Time zone: UTC+5:30 (Indian Standard Time)
- PIN: 680664
- Telephone codetemplatedata: 91 (0)485 XXX XXXX
- Vehicle registration: KL-47
- Civic agency: Methala Grama Panchayat
- Weather: Am/Aw (Köppen)
- Precipitation: 1,700 millimetres (67 in)
- Avg. annual temperature: 27.2 °C (81.0 °F)
- Avg. summer temperature: 35 °C (95 °F)
- Avg. winter temperature: 24.4 °C (75.9 °F)

Sringapuram is a village in the Thrissur district of Kerala state, India. It is located about 2 km from the town of Kodungallur.

== Places of worship ==
- Sringapuram Mahadeva Temple
- Sri Kumara Subramanya Swamy Temple
- Kunnumpuram Temple
- Durga Bhagwati Temple at Pararath
- Thiruvanchikkulam Mahadeva Temple
- Sri Dharmashastha Temple Sringapuram
- St. Mary's Church

== Educational institutions ==
- Bharatiya Vidya Bhavan's Vidya Mandir School
- Government Higher Secondary School

== Roads ==
- Kodakara Kodungallur Highway
- Palpu College Road
