= Guruvayur Maraprabhu =

Statue of Guruvayurappan in Kerala, India

Guruvayur Maraprabhu is a 54 feet (16 m) terracotta statue located at the Sreevalsam Guest House Complex in Guruvayur, Kerala, India. It is a creative interpretation of lord Guruvayurappan.

The word Maraprabhu means the ‘lord of tree’. The statue was inaugurated by K. Karunakaran, the popular Congress leader and former Chief Minister of Kerala on 24 June 1995, his 77th birthday (according to Malayalam customs).The sculpture was designed by P.V.Ramachandran (a well known artist of terracotta monuments in Kerala); chief sculptor being Krishnan Paloor, mainly assisted by Nilambur Apputty Swami, Nilambur Kuttan, Nilambur Chamy and Kozhikode Gopalan (all belonging to the traditional pottery community).

== Myth ==
Melpathur and Poonthanam were contemporary scholars and both were devotees of Guruvayurappan. The writing styles of Melpathur and Poonthanam were different. Melpathur used Sanskrit and at the same time Poonthanam used Malayalam. Once at a Sahasranamam recital Poonthanam wrongly recited ’ Padmanabha Amaraparbhu’ as ‘Padmanabha Maraprabhu' which means God of trees. Melpathur insulted Poonthanam by openly laughing out at him. Poonthanam’s compositions were brimmed with devotion and he was humble. The myth goes like this. Guruvayurappan himself came to the aid of his devotee and intervened as a celestial voice that ‘ I am also Maraprabhu‘ to save him from insult.

== Features ==
The sculptor P.V. Ramachandran is the one who is behind the construction of terracotta sculpture which is 52 feet tall. Thousands of artists labored hard for the construction of Guruvayur Maraprabhu. It was inaugurated by former Kerala Chief Minister, K. Karunakaran, who was the then Industrial Minister, Government of India.

== Significance ==
Maraprabhu is the symbol of cure with the help of herbs. Trees and Herbs are the ultimate source of medicines and it can cure ailments and can save the life. The Maraprabhu idol is said to generate immense cosmic energy because of the medicinal herbs used in its construction.
