= Middle Malayalam =

Period of the Malayalam language

- മധ്യകാലമലയാളം
- Pronunciation: Madhyakālamalayāḷam
- Region: Kerala
- Era: Developed into Modern Malayalam by the 15th century
- Language family: Dravidian: Southern; Tamil–Kannada; Tamil–Kodagu; Tamil-Malayalam; Middle Malayalam
- Early form: Old Malayalam
- Writing system: Vatteluttu, then Kolezhuthu, Malayanma, Grantha

Language codes
- ISO 639-3: –
- Glottolog: None

Middle Malayalam is the period of the Malayalam language spanning from 13th century to 15th century AD.

The works including Unniyachi Charitham, Unnichiruthevi Charitham, and Unniyadi Charitham, are written in Middle Malayalam, those date back to 13th and 14th centuries of Common Era. The Sandesha Kavyas of 14th century CE written in Manipravalam language include Unnuneeli Sandesam. The word Manipravalam literally means Diamond-Coral or Ruby-Coral. The 14th-century Lilatilakam text states Manipravalam to be a Bhashya (language) where "Malayalam and Sanskrit should combine together like ruby and coral, without the least trace of any discord". Kannassa Ramayanam and Kannassa Bharatam by Rama Panikkar of the Niranam poets who lived between 1350 and 1450 are representative of this language. The Champu Kavyas written by Punam Nambudiri, one among the Pathinettara Kavikal (Eighteen and a half poets) in the court of the Zamorin of Calicut, also belong to Middle Malayalam.

The Old Malayalam language ( 1stcentury BCE – 13th century CE) was employed in several official records and transactions (at the level of the Chera Perumal kings as well as the upper-caste (Nambudiri) villages). It was an inscriptional language and there was not any literary work of its own, with possible exceptions of Ramacharitam and Thirunizhalmala. However the Malayalam literature completely diverged from the contemporary Tamil literature by the period of Middle Malayalam. The Middle Malayalam period marked the commencement of the unique traits of Malayalam literature. The literary works written in Middle Malayalam were heavily influenced by Sanskrit and Prakrit, while comparing them with the modern Malayalam literature.
