= Poonthottam Achhan Nambudiri =

Indian poet

Poonthottam Achhan Nambudiri (also known as Poonthottam Parameshwaran Nambudiri) (c. 1821–1865) was a poet of the Venmani School of Malayalam Literature.

Nambudiri was born in about 1821 in Killikkurussimangalam, Palakkad district. He was a close friend and associate of Venmani Achhan Nambudiripad from Kodungalloor.

Nambudiri was a talented poet whose works include Ambareesha Charitham (Ottan Thullal), Kaalakeya Vadham (Seethankan Thullal), Syamanthakam (Aattakkathha) and a few Muktakams. His son Damodaran Nambudiri was also a poet and was known as Poonthottam Mahan Nambudiri.
