= Attoor Krishna Pisharody =

Sanskrit scholar, teacher and writer

Attoor Krishna Pisharody (Āttūr)
- Born: Krishnachandra; 29 September 1875; Attoor
- Died: 5 June 1964 (aged 88); Thrissur
- Occupations: Teacher, Writer, Dramatist, Musicologist
- Spouse: Nāṇikuṭṭi Piṣārasyār (m. 1900–1956)
- Children: three children
- Writing career
- Language: Sanskrit, Malayalam

Attoor Krishna Pisharody (1875–1964) was a Sanskrit scholar, teacher and writer from Kerala, India. He was born on September 29, 1875, in Vadakkancheri in Thrissur district to Narayanan Namboothiri and Pappikkutty Pisharasyar. He learned Sanskrit in the traditional way from Kodungalloor Godavarma Bhattan Thampuran. From 1911 to 1929 he taught at Maharajas college (present day University college), Trivandrum and for the next five years worked as the Sanskrit tutor to the Maharaja of Travancore. He was the editor of two magazines Rasika rathnam and Mangalodayam. He was a veena artist and musicologist well. He died on June 5, 1964.

== Major works ==
- Sangeetha chandrika
- Bhashayum Sahityavum
- Bhasha sahitya charitham
- Kerala charitham
- Vidya vivekam
- Bhasha darpanam
- Uthara Ramayanam (Translation)
- Shakunthalam (Translation)
- Leelathilakam (Commentary on the 14th century text Leelathilakam)
