= Akavoor Narayanan =

Indian literary critic

- Born: Narayanan Nampoothirippad; 1929; Aluva, Kingdom of Cochin, British India
- Died: 2 December 2009 (aged 79–80); New Delhi, India
- Education: University College Thiruvananthapuram
- Occupations: writer, scholar and critic
- Spouse: Gowri Antharjanam
- Children: 3
- Writing career
- Notable work: Venmani Prasthanam (study)
- Notable awards: Kerala Sahitya Akademi Endowment

Akavoor Narayanan was a Malayalam language writer, scholar and critic from Kerala, India. His most important work is Venmani Prasthanam, which is a study on the nineteenth century Malayalam poetry movement known as Venmani Movement. He has authored more than twenty books, including three Aattakkathas.

== Biography ==
Narayanan Nampoothirippad was born in 1929 at Akavoor Mana in Vellarapilly, Aluva of present-day Ernakulam district. As a child he studied Vedas and Sanskrit. After passing intermediate at Union Christian College, Aluva, degree in chemistry from University College, Thiruvananthapuram and post graduate degree in Malayalam literature with first class, he became Malayalam lecturer at Sree Kerala Varma College, Thrissur and worked there for nine years. Then in 1968, he became a lecturer of Malayalam in the Department of Modern Languages at the University of Delhi and continued there till he retired in 1994.

Narayanan has written reviews of Malayalam books in the Hindu daily since 1950. He has also written several articles and books on Kathakali. He has also served as chairman of the International Center for Kathakali and editor of Pranavam magazine. He was appointed Malayalam Sub Editor of the Directorate of Audio Visual Publicity in Delhi in 1961 and later became the Malayalam Editor of the Indian Council for Agricultural Research (ICAR). Narayanan, who was a member of the Malayalam language advisory board of several institutions including Aligarh University, Punjab University, UPSC, CBSE and UGC, was also served as advisor at the Civil Service Training Academy in Mussoorie.

=== Personal life and death ===
He and his wife Gowri Antharjanam have 3 children. He died on 2 December 2009 at New Delhi.

== Works ==
- Venmani Prasthanam (in Malayalam). Kottayam: Sahithya Pravarthaka Co-operative Sosciety. 1982.
- Akavoorinte lokam (in Malayalam). Kottayam: Current Books. 2002.
- Kunhikkuttan Thampuran (in Malayalam). Delhi: Sahitya Akademi. 2010. ISBN 9788126026944.
- Vakathiriv (in Malayalam) (2nd ed.). DC books. 2001. ISBN 978-8126403165.
- Artharuchi (in Malayalam). Kozhokode: PK Brothers. 1995. Essays
- Ilamkoompukal (in Malayalam). Mangalodayam. 1955.
- Vyakthi vivekam (in Malayalam). Kozhikode: Poorna Publications. 2004.
- Arivukal Anubhoothikal (in Malayalam). Kottayam: DC books. 1996.
- Arangaliyavar (in Malayalam). 1989.
- Kavi Kokilam (attakkatha)
- Uthara Ramayanam (attakkatha)
- Sreeramodantham
- Krishi Bodhini
- Lakshminath Base Baruva. 1974. (translation)
- Perspectives (essays in English)
- Kathakali Rasayanam (in Malayalam). Kozhikode: Mathrubhumi Books. 2008. ISBN 9788182645691.
- Sajjanasamsargam. Mathrubhumi Books. 2011. (memoirs)

== Awards and honors ==
- Kerala Sahithya Akademi Endowment Award 2005 for Akavoorinte Lokam
