= Unniyachi Charitham =

Poem

Unniyachi Charitham is considered to be the oldest of the ancient Manipravala Champukas and the first Champukavya in the Malayalam language. It is believed to be written in the 13th century during the Middle Malayalam period. The poem is about Unniyachi, a dancer of Tirumaruthur temple near Tirunelli. Uyyiyachi Charitham has its place in various fields like language, literature, social and national history. Thevar Chirikumaran is mentioned in the poem as its author. It is also mentioned in the poem that Rama Chirikumaran copied the poem in the Palm-leaf manuscript.

== Overview ==
The period of writing of the poem is believed to be between the beginning and the end of the 13th century. From the references in this work itself, Ulloor postulates that the Unniachicharitam must have been written before 1346 AD. The theme of Unniyachi Charitham is the infatuation of a Gandharvan with Unniyachi, the younger of the two daughters of Nangaiah's daughter Achiyar, who came from Atiyamanallur in Salem to Kolathunath and from there to Tirumaruthur in Purakizhanadu (present Kottayam).

== See also ==
- Unnichiruthevi Charitham
- Manipravalam
