= Poonthottam Mahan Nambudiri =

Indian poet

Poonthottam Mahan Nambudiri (also known as Poonthottam Damodaran Nambudiri) (1857–1946) was a poet from the Venmani School of Malayalam Literature.

He was the author of several Malayalam poems like Thaarakaasura Vadham, Raajasooyam, Kuchelavritham, Guruvaayupura Maahaatmyam. His father was Poonthottam Achhan Nambudiri.
