= Manipravala champu =

Collection of Sanskrit poems

The three Pracheena Manipravala Champu poems are Unniyachi Charitham, Unniyadi Charitham and Unni Chiruthevi Charitham.

Champu (or Champukkal) poems, written in the model of Sanskrit Champu poetry, defined the development of medieval Malayalam poetry. The padya or "verse" portion of a Champu poem was written in Sanskrit meters while the gadya or "prose" portion was almost in medieval Malayalam meters.

Champu poems can be classified into two types, being Pracheena Manipravala Champukkal and Madhyakala Champukkal.

Ramayanam Champu, Bharatham Champu, Naishadham Champu, Rajaratnavaleeyam Champu, Kodiyam Viraham Champu, Kamadahanam Champu, Chellur Nadhodayam Champu, Narayaneeyam Champu and Thenkaila Nadhodayam Champu are the main Madhyakala Champu poems.
