= Sringapuram Mahadeva Temple =

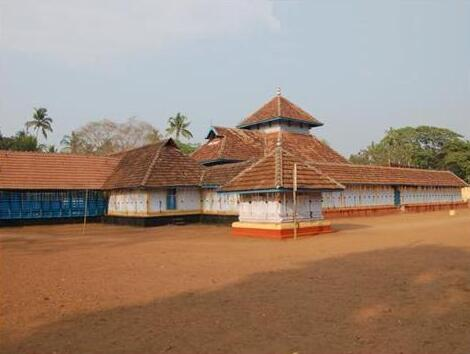
- Sringapuram Mahadeva Temple

- Sringapuram Mahadeva Temple, Kodungallur, Thrissur, Kerala

Religion
- Affiliation: Hinduism
- District: Thrissur
- Deity: Shiva
- Festival: Maha Shivaratri

Location
- Location: Kodungallur
- State: Kerala
- Country: India
- Interactive map of Sringapuram Mahadeva Temple
- Coordinates: 10.218029°N 76.201014°E

Architecture
- Type: Kerala

Specifications
- Temple: One
- Elevation: 29.3 m (96 ft)

Sringapuram Mahadeva Temple is a Shiva Temple, (Malayalam: ശൃംഗപുരം മഹാദേവക്ഷേത്രം) and is located at Kodungallur in Thrissur District of Kerala. The temple adjoins the Kodungallur Kovilakam Palace. The presiding deity of the temple is Shiva.
