= List of fiction writers in Malayalam =

This is a list of fiction writers in Malayalam language.

== A - B ==
- Akbar Kakkattil (1954–)
- Anand (1936–)
- B. M. Suhara

== C - D ==
- C. Radhakrishnan (1939–)
- C. V. Balakrishnan (1952-)
- C. V. Raman Pillai (1858–1922)
- C. V. Sreeraman (1931–2007)
- Chandramathi (Chandrika Balan) (1954-)

== E - F ==
- E. Harikumar (1943–)
- E. V. Krishna Pillai (1894–1938)

== G - H ==
- G. R. Indugopan (1974–)
- George Onakkoor
- George Joseph K. (1955-)

== I - J ==
- Jose Panachippuram (1951–)
- Joy J. Kaimaparamban (1939–)

== K - L ==
- K. P. Ramanunni (1955–)
- K. Saraswathi Amma (1919–1975)
- K. Surendran (1921–1997)
- Kakkanadan (1935–)
- Kanam EJ (1926–1982)
- Karoor Neelakanta Pillai (1898–1975)
- Kottayam Pushpanath (1937–2018)
- Kovilan (1923–2010)
- Lajo Jose
- Lalithambika Antharjanam (1909–1987)
- Leela Devi (1932–1998)

== M - N ==
- N. Prabhakaran (1952–)
- M. Mukundan (1942–)
- M. Sukumaran (1943–)
- M. P. Narayana Pillai (1939–1998)
- M. T. Vasudevan Nair (1933–2024)
- Madampu Kunjukuttan (1941–2021)
- Madhavikkutti (Kamala Surayya) (1934–2009)
- Malayatoor Ramakrishnan (1927–1999)
- Maythil Radhakrishnan (1944–)
- Muttathu Varkey (1917–1989)
- Nalini Bekal (1954-)
- N. P. Mohammed (1929–2003)
- N. S. Madhavan (1948–)
- Nandanar (1926-1999)

== O - P ==
- O. Chandhu Menon (1847–1899)
- O. V. Vijayan (1931–2005)
- P. Ayyaneth (1928-2008)
- P. Kesavadev (1905–1983)
- P. Padmarajan (1945–1991)
- P. Surendran (1961–)
- P. Valsala (1938–2023)
- P. F. Mathews (1960-)
- P. C. Sanal Kumar (1949–)
- P. K. Balakrishnan (1926–1991)
- Pamman (1920–2007)
- Parappurath (1924–1981)
- Perumbadavam Sreedharan (1938–)
- Ponkunnam Varkey (1911–2004)
- Punathil Kunjabdulla (1940–2017)

== Q - R ==
- Raghunath Paleri
- Rajalakshmi (1930–1965)
- Rajesh Chithira

== S - T ==
- S. K. Pottekkatt (1913–1982)
- Sarah Joseph (1946–)
- Sethu (1942–)
- Sumangala (1934–)
- Thakazhi Sivasankara Pillai (1912–1999)
- T. Padmanabhan (1931–)
- T. V. Varkey (1938–)
- Thikkodiyan (1916–2001)
- T.V. Kochubava (1955-1999)

== U - V ==
- Unnikrishnan Puthoor (1933–)
- Uroob (1915–1979)
- V. Balakrishnan (1932–2004)
- Vaikom Chandrasekharan Nair (1920–2005)
- Vaikom Muhammad Basheer (1908–1994)
- Veloor Krishnankutty (1929–2003)
- Vengayil Kunhiraman Nayanar (1861–1914)
- Vilasini (1928–1993)
- VKN (1932–2004)

== W - Z ==
- Zacharia

== See also ==
- List of people from Kerala
