= Venmani Mahan Nambudiripad =

Indian poet

Venmani Mahan Nambudiripad (1844-1893) (also known as KadambanKadambhan) was a famous Malayalam poet of the Venmani Illam and one of the main literary figures of the Venmani Movement of Malayalam Literature.

Venmani Mahan was born in 1844 to the famous Venmani Achhan Nambudiripad and Sreedevi of Polpaya Mana. He was a reputed scholar and practitioner of Rig Vedam. He started writing poetry from a very early age, but because of his natural laziness and lethargy he could not finish most of his poems. He never kept any of his poems in written form because he could recite whatever he wrote, at any required time.

His main works include Pooraprabandham (describing the Pooram of Thrissur), Omana Kuttan Govindan, Bhothibhooshacharitam, Three Aattakathhaas, Madhuraapuricharitam, Kavipushpamaala, Sangamesa Yaathra, Sangamesaashtakam, four Thullal works as well as numerous songs and devotional verses.

He died in 1893 of smallpox at the age of 49.
