= Jnanappana =

16th century Malayalam devotional poem

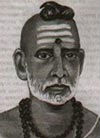
Poonthanam Nambudiri

Jnanappana is a devotional poem written by the 16th century Malayalam poet Poonthanam. This poem written as a devotional prayer to Guruvayoorappan is considered as an important work in Malayalam literature. Written in simple Malayalam, the Jnanappana was Poonthanam's magnum opus and is an important work of Bhakti literature from Kerala and is revered for its poetic merit and intensity of devotion.

== About ==
Jnanappana can be considered as the Bhagavad Gita of Malayali Hindus. This is a darshanika kavyam or philosophical poem expressed in simple Malayalam for ordinary people. The Jnanappana is noted for its literary quality, the use of simple phrases, its philosophical strength and reflects Poonthanam's deep bhakti to Guruvayoorappan. Jnanappana consists of 360 lines of verse written in the pana metre of Malayalam poetry. The Jnanappana is noted for its use of opposing images through which Poonthanam draws out the cosmic acts of Krishna through the web of karma.

In the Jnanappana, Poonthanam Namboothiri, an ardent devotee of Shri Guruvayurappan, transforms his unbearable sorrow from his infant son's death into a yogavishesham. He used this sad experience to build his Bhakti soudham or house of devotion and opens it for all devotees for all time. The line "unnikrishnan manasil kalikumbol, unnikal mattu venamo makkalai" (When the baby Krishna plays in one's mind, does one need one's own children?) expresses the poet's grief at the death of his child and his deep devotion to Guruvayurappan even in that grief-stricken state. Even though the language is very simple, Jnanappana, or song of wisdom deals within it with the essence of the Srimad Bhagavatam, Bhagavad Gita, Bhajagovindam, Viveka Chudamani and Narayaneeyam. According to legend, Poonthanam's humility and unflinching devotion prompted Guruvayoorappan to prefer the poem to Poonthanam's contemporary and literary rival Melpathur Narayana Bhattathiri's ‘Narayaneeyam’.

The devotional hymn ‘Kandu Kandangirikkum Janangale’ is from the Jnanappana.

Jnanappana has been transcreated into English by poet cum writer Dr Gopi Kottoor, the book "Poonthanam's Hymns Gynapana - The Fountain Of God" is published by Writer's workshop Calcutta.

== See also ==
- Narayaniyam
