= Tolan =

Tolan is a surname.

== Notable people ==
Notable people with the surname include:

- Bobby Tolan (born 1945), American baseball player
- Brentwood S. Tolan (1855–1923), American architect
- Eddie Tolan (1908–1967), American athlete and sprinter
- John H. Tolan (1877–1947), U.S. Representative from California
- John V. Tolan, historian of religious and cultural relations between the Arab and Latin worlds in the Middle Ages
- Johnnie Tolan (1917–1986), American racecar driver
- Michael Tolan (born 1925), American actor
- Peter Tolan (born 1958), American television producer, director, and screenwriter
- Stephanie S. Tolan, American author
- Thomas J. Tolan (1830–1883), American architect
- Tolan (medieval poet), south Indian poet and kudiyattam playwright

== See also ==
- Tollan, Mesoamerican city
- Jicaquean languages, also called Tolan
- Diphenylacetylene, sometimes called tolan
