= Kodungallur Kovilakam =

Palace in Kerala, India

Kodungallur Kovilakam is a palace of the royal family of the late medieval Kingdom of Kodungallur (Cranganore), in the modern-day Indian state of Kerala. Kodungallur was a feudal principality subordinate to the rulers of the Kingdom of Cochin from the later half of the eighteenth century until Indian independence. The Kingdom of Kodungallur was under the protection of the Dutch government after 1707 for a few years before returning to its allegiance to the Zamorin. The Kodungallur Royal Family had two branches, at Chirakkal Kovilakam and Puthen Kovilakam.

== Design ==
The Chirakkal Kovilakam has two nalukettu structures, one larger than the other. The main residential building and two more old buildings, a water tank (known as padakulam), the family temple (dedicated to Hindu goddess Talattil Bhagavati) and Sarpakkavu are all within the Kovilakam Complex. The Kodungallur Kovilakam was renowned as a gurukulam (centre of learning). Scholars from across present day Kerala used to live in the palaces and study Sanskrit and Vedic science. Eminent scholars from this Kovilakam contributed to Malayalam and Sanskrit literature. According to Venmani Achan Namboodiribad, Kerala's gurukulams were for many decades centred on the Kodungallur Kovilakam.

== Puthen Kovilakam ==
Puthen Kovilakam means "new palace". This Kovilakam (manor house) was known by the name "Gurukulam". It was a well-known learning center. Many eminent scholars from this Kovilakam contributed to Malayalam and Sanskrit literature.

== Literature ==
Writers born there contributed immensely to Malayalam literature. The leading light among them was Venmani Achan Namboodiripad, born in 1816 at Venmani Illam in Vellarappilly, Alwaye. Achan married Sreedevi Antharjanam in 1838 and they had one son, Venmani Mahan Namboodiripad. Later, he married Kunhippilla Thampuratti of the Kodungallur Kovilakam. He had two children from this marriage – Kunjikuttan Thamburan and Kunjunni Thamburan. Achan died at the age of 74. Namboodiripad lived for several years in Ernakulam, Thripunithura, Kodungallur and Kottayam. At the Kodungallur Palace, Mahan found his calling as a poet. After Kathollil Achuta Menon completed primary education at home, he was sent to Kodungallur Palace to study Sanskrit under Vidwan Kunjiramavarma Thamburan. At age 16, he started writing poetry and composed approximately 20 slokas in an hour during competitions.

Key members of this gurukula were:

- Veena specialist Valia Thampuran (Kunjiramavarma Thampuran). First guru of Kodungallur Gurukulam
- Vidwan Elaya Thampuran (Godavarma Thampuran), Contemporary of Swathi Thirunal Rama Varma
- Sakran Godavarma Thampuran
- Vidwan Kunjiramavarma Thampuran
- Valia Kunjunni Thampuran
- Valia Kochunni Thampuran
- Kunjan Thampuran
- Cheria Kochunni Thampuran (Kavi Sarvabhouman)
- Bhattan Godavarma Thampuran
- Mani Madhava Chakyar
- Bhagavathar Kunjunni Thampuran
- Kochikavu Thampuratti
- Kodungallur Kunjikuttan Thampuran

Most popular among these scholars is Kodungallur Kunjikuttan Thampuran.
