= Velutheri Kesavan Vaidyar =

Velutheri Kesavan Vaidyar(1858–1896) was a Malayalam poet; Sanskrit scholar and Ayurveda physician from the state of Kerala, India.

He is associated with the Venmani School of Malayalam Literature. Kesavan was a schoolmate, friend and follower of Sree Narayana Guru. His literary output ranged from original poetry to adaptations and translations from prominent Sanskrit pieces and even attakkathas and prose like academic texts on grammar in Malayalam.

== Birth and family ==
Kesavan was born second child to Eeshwaran Padmanabhan of Velutheri House in Thottam, and Azhaki Amma of Thalathoppu House in Karinkulam. Velutheri House is situated in a serene residential locality named Thottam in Manacaud, a place close to Padmanabhaswamy Temple. Kesavan married Lekshmi Amma of Karickal family at the age of 29.

== Biography - 'Randu Vidwat Kavikal - Volume 1' ==
Mahopadhyaaya Vidwan Kunju Krishnan had authored and published a two-volume biographical work titled 'Vismritharaya Randu Vidwat Kavikal (Velutheriyum Perunnelliyum)' on the life and work of Velutheriyil Kesavan Vaidyar and his equally eminent contemporary; scholar; poet and dear friend Perunnelli Krishnan Vaidyar. 'Vismritharaya Randu Vidwat Kavikal (Velutheriyum Perunnelliyum) - 1', the biography of Velutheriyil Kesavan Vaidyar was published in the year 1951 and 'Randu Vidwat Kavikal Volume-2', the biography of Perunnelli Krishnan Vaidyar was published in the year 1975 which was almost twenty five years after the former was published.

== Major literary works ==
- Balisugreeva Sambhavam (Vanchippattu/Malayalam poetry composed in the Dravidian metre Nathonnata)
- Abhijnana Shakunthalam (Malayalam translation)
- Ashtangahridayam (Malayalam translation)
- Hithopadesam (Malayalam translation)
- Sundopasundayudham (Aattakkatha/libretto for Kathakali)
- Prasannaraghavam (Malayalam translation)
- Sourapuranam (Malayalam translation)
- Arthalankara Manipravalam (Alankarashastra adaptation in Malayalam)
- Balapaddhamrutham (Grammar)
- Vanchiraja Vamshacharitham (epic poem in Sanskrit)
- Durganandavilasom (Sanskrit devotional poetry)
