= Venmani Achhan Nambudiripad =

Indian poet

Venmani Parameshwaran Nambudiripad (1817–1890), popularly known as Venmani Achhan Nambudiripad was a poet of Malayalam. He was born in the Venmani Illam, a family which was involved in the Venmani School of Malayalam Literature. He was the nephew of Venmani Vishnu Nambudiripad, another well-known poet of the era.

Achhan Nambudiripad evolved a simple poetic style, which the common people could understand and appreciate. He was married to Sreedevi from the Polpaya Mana and also to Kunjippilla Thampuratti, a princess from the Kodungalloor Royal family. His sons, Venmani Mahan and Kodungallur Kunjikkuttan Thampuran carried on his scholarly legacy.

Venmani Achhan initiated the poetic structure of the long narrative and letter writing in verse. Unfortunately, none of his poems were published in his lifetime but many were transmitted from generation to generation by heart.
