= Poonthanam Nambudiri =

Poet and devotee of Guruvayurappan

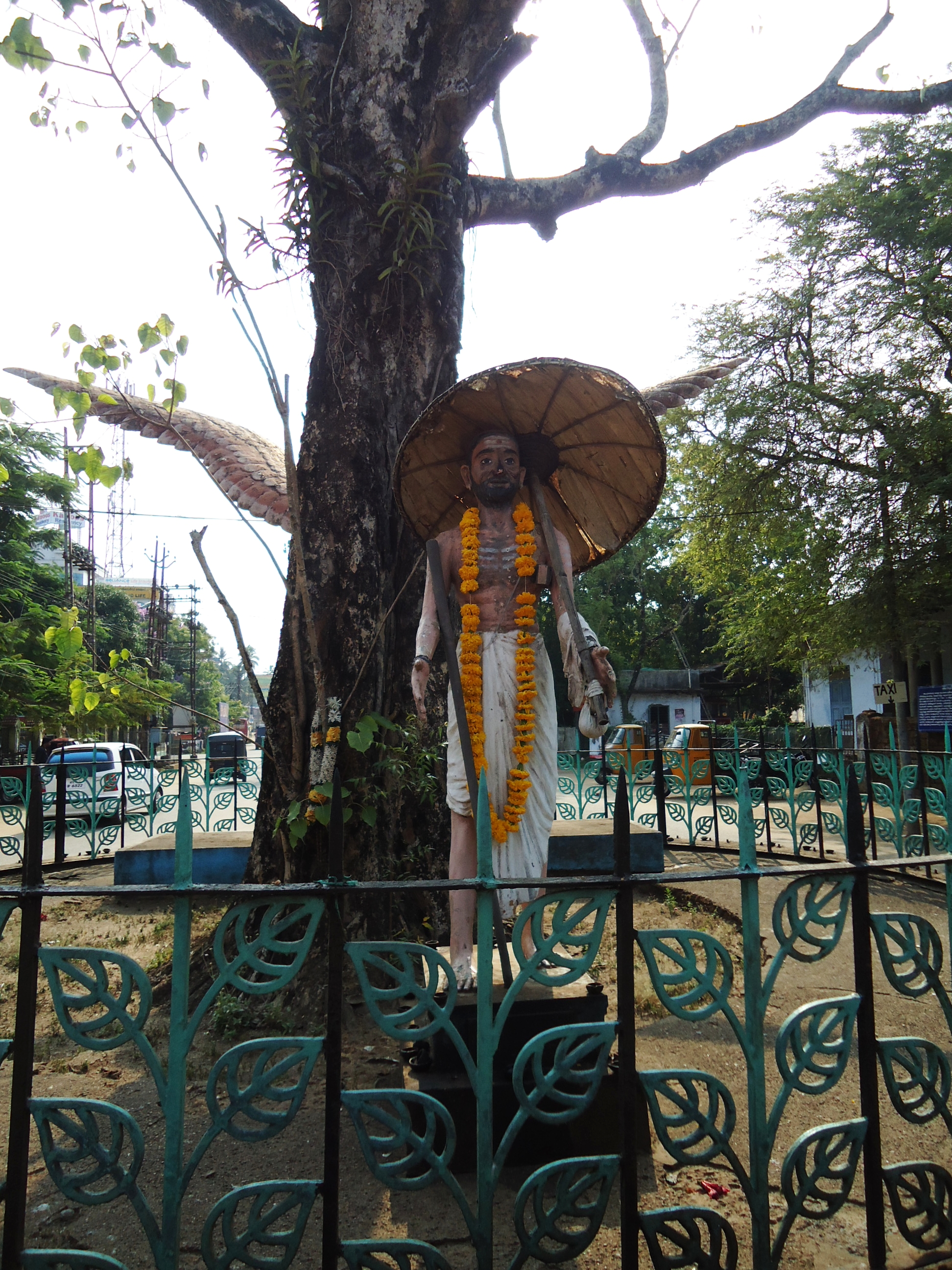
- Statue of Poonthanam Namboothiri, Guruvayur, Kerala

Personal life
- Born: 1547 CE Keezhattoor, near Perinthalamanna in present-day Malapuram district, Kerala
- Died: 1640 CE
- Known for: Poet, Vaishnavism (Krishna)

Religious life
- Religion: Hinduism

Poonthanam Nambudiri (1547–1640 CE) was a famous poet and a devotee of Guruvayurappan, who lived in Keezhattoor in what is now Malappuram district, Kerala, India. He is remembered for his masterpiece, Jnanappana which means "the song of divine wisdom" in Malayalam. His other chief poems in Malayalam are Bhasha Karnamritam and Kumaraharanam or Santanagopalam Pana. His other works include Raghaviyam, Vishnuvilasam and Sitaraghavam in Sanskrit and Vishnugeeta and Panchatantram in modern Malayalam.

Many hymns and prayer songs which are still popular in Kerala have been attributed to Poonthanam.

== Early life ==
Poonthanam was born in 1547 in the month of masi on the day of Aswini, at Keezhattoor, near Perinthalmanna in Malapuram district, into a Namboodiri Brahmin family. He married at 20, but for a long time, they had no children. He began to propitiate the Lord of Guruvayur by reciting the ‘[Santhana Gopalam]’ and a son was born. He called for a celebration and everybody known was invited, but the child died an hour before the Annaprasanam ceremony. Grief-stricken, Poonthanam sought refuge at Guruvayur and started praying with the puranic story of Kumaraharanam. The heartbroken Poonthanam, it is said, was consoled by Guruvayurappan himself, who lay down on his lap, for a moment, as a child. He considered Lord Krishna as his son and achieved enlightenment. In the Jnanappana he writes: "While little Krishna is dancing in our hearts, do we need little ones of our own?". Poonthanam spent the rest of his life reading the Bhagavatham and singing the Lord's glories in simple Malayalam. His magnum opus, the Jnanappana, was composed during this period. His house, the Poonthanam Illam is now under the Guruvayur Devaswom.

== Poonthanam and Melpathur ==
He was a contemporary of Melpathur Narayana Bhattathiri, another famous poet from Athavanad. Melputhur, the author of the Sanskrit work Narayaneeyam, was a famed scholar who out of pride refused Poonthanam's request to read his Jnanappana, a work in Malayalam. Legend has it that Guruvayurappan, impressed by Poonthanam's humility and devotion preferred his works to those of Bhattathiri's and once even rebuked Bhattathiri for ignoring Poonthanam's Santhanagopala Paana saying he preferred Poonthanam’s genuine bhakti to Bhattathiri’s vibhakti.

== Works ==
The chief poems of Poonthanam are Jnanappana, Bhasha Karnamritam and Kumaraharanam or Santanagopalam Pana. Jnanappana (transliteration: The Song of Divine Wisdom) is a veritable storehouse of transcendental knowledge which is firmly rooted in the experiences of this world. In a language, absolutely free from regionalism and dialectal influences, unadorned with excessive rhetorical features, through a series of concrete pictures taken from contemporary life, the poet is able to drive home his perception of the short lived nature of the ephemeral aspects of life. His religious meditations flow uncluttered and unencumbered with irrelevant matter. Jnanappana has been transcreated into English by poet cum writer Dr Gopi Kottoor, the book "Poonthanam's Hymns - The Fountain Of God" is published by Writer's Workshop, Calcutta.

Bhasha Karnamritam is a devotional work intended to create devotion to Lord Krishna in the readers. Santanagopalam Pana tells the story of a Brahmin father who lost all his children and sought the help of the Pandava prince Arjuna. Arjuna proudly offered to help him preserve his next child alive, but he was unable to keep his word. The Brahmin abuses Arjuna to his great anguish and in his wounded pride he decides to commit suicide by leaping into flames. Krishna out of love for Arjuna, intervenes at the last moment and takes him to Vaikuntha from where they recover all the lost children of the Brahmin. Krishna's infinite love for his devotees is thus the central theme, but the poem also makes its appeal because of its down-to-earth realism and unmistakable touch of authenticity.

== Bhakti ==
Poonthanam preached Namasmaranam, or the constant remembrance of the Lord's name, as the only way to reach Him. He emphasised the futility of material existence and advocated instead service to the Lord through the Nama japa, or recitation of the names of the Lord, as the path to moksha. At the end of each verse of the Jnanappana, the nama japa of ‘Krishna Krishna Mukunda Janardhana,’ stresses Poonthanam's emphasis on nama sankeerthanam. Jnanappana has been transcreated into English by poet cum writer Dr Gopi Kottoor, the book "Poonthanam's Hymns - The Fountain Of God" is published by Writer's Workshop, Calcutta.

Over a period of time, Poonthaanam has acquired the status of most sought after commentator of the scriptures in Guruvaayoor Temple. He was also like a VIP in any of the Forums. In the regular feast held in the temple, Poonthaanam was accorded the most prominent seat meant for the VIP. One day certain other important dignitary had arrived in the temple. The authorities concerned asked Poonthaanam to vacate the main seat for accommodating the guest. Hesitatingly, Poonthaanam made way. However, thereupon happened one more incorporeal proclamation from the sanctum sanctorum:" Poonthaanam need not stay in the temple any more with unfriendly people as I have decided to come to your house. I will visit your house (on such and such date) and stay there for ever".

Poonthaanam obeyed the divine command and proceeded to his house. On the destined day he was seen extending hospitality to the invisible guest at his house- apparently the visit by God. He constructed a temple to install the lord on the "left" side of the house and it had come to be known as the left side temple during his times.This temple is now known by the name Edathupuram Poonthanam Sree Krishna temple.The main deity here is believed to be the representation of Guruvayurappan. For those who could not visit Guruvayur temple due to health or personal reasons can visit this temple instead.

== Death ==
According to legend, Poonthanam left this world in his body in 1640. When he announced his departure for his Lord's abode, he invited anyone who wanted to join him, which all the villagers declined. Ultimately, his wife joined him on this journey.

== See also ==
- Guruvayurappan
- Melpathur Narayana Bhattathiri
