= E. Harikumar =

Indian writer (1943–2020)

- Born: 13 July 1943; Ponnani, Kerala, India
- Died: 24 March 2020 (aged 76)
- Occupations: Novelist, short story writer
- Website: e-harikumar.com

Edasseri Harikumar (13 July 1943 – 24 March 2020) was an Indian Malayalam novelist and short story writer and novelist in Malayalam, the language of Kerala in South West India. Born on 13 July 1943 in Ponani a coastal town between Calicut and Kochi. Harikumar's parents were Edasseri Govindan Nair, a well-known poet and playwright, and E. Janaki Amma, who in her early years had written poems and stories and translated Tagore's Fruit Gathering into Malayalam. Married Lalitha. Son Ajay, married. Wife: Subha.

Harikumar was a member of the Kerala Sahitya Akademi, the foremost literary institution under the Cultural Department of Government of Kerala, for two terms from 1998 till 2006. He died on 24 March 2020, due to COVID-19 at the age of 76.

== Awards ==
- Kerala Sahitya Akademi Award for the year 1988 for anthology of short stories titled Dinosarinte Kutty (The Dinosaur's Baby),
- Padmarajan Award in 1997 for the best story of the year ‘Pachhapayyine Pidikkan’ (To Catch A Grasshopper)
- Nalappadan Award for the book ‘Sookshichu Vacha Mayilpeeli’ (Peacock Feather Treasured) in 1998
- Kathapeedam Award for the book ‘Anithayude Veedu’ (Anitha's House) in 2006
- Kerala State Chalachithra Academy Award for best story for the TV film ‘Sreeparvathiyude Paadam’ (Holy Foot of Goddess Sreeparvathi) in 2012

== List of works ==
=== Novels ===
1. Urangunna Sarpangal (The Serpents Dormant)
2. Asaktiyude Agninalangal (The Flames of Passion)
3. Oru Kudumbapuranam (A Family Saga)
4. Engine Drivere Snehicha Penkutti (The Girl Who Loved An Engine Driver)
5. Ayanangal (The Solstices)
6. Thadakatheerathu (On the banks of the Lakes)
7. Pranayathinnoru Software (A software for Love)
8. Kochambratti (Young Mistress)
9. Ariyathalangalilekku (Journey to the Unknown)

=== Memoir ===
1. Nee Evideyanenkilum (Wherever You're)
2. Ee Oramakal Marikkathirikkatte (Let Not Die These Memories)

=== Stories ===
1. Koorakal (The Cockroaches)
2. Vrishabhathinte Kannu (The eye of the Taurus)
3. Kumkumam Vithariya Vazhikal (Alleys Sprinkled With Vermilion)
4. Dinosarinte Kutti (The Dinosaur's Baby)
5. Canadayilninnoru Rajakumari (A Princess from Canada)
6. Sreeparvathiyude Paadam (The Holy Foot of Goddess Sri Parvathi)
7. Sookshichu Vacha Mayilpeeli (The Peacock Feather Treasured)
8. Pachappayine Pidikkan (To Catch a Grasshopper)
9. Doore Oru Nagarathil (In a City Far Away)
10. Karutha Thambratti (The Black Mistress)
11. Anithayude Veedu (Anitha's House)
12. Nagaravasiyaya Oru Kutti (Boy Who Lives in the City)
13. Ilaveyilinte Santhwanam (Solace of the Mellow Sunshine)
14. Vellithirayilennapole (As If In A Silver Screen)
15. Ente Sthreekal (My Women)
16. Ummukkulsoonte Veedu (House of Ummukkulsu)

Mr. E. Harikumar has posted his complete works from 1962 to 2013 in his website. He has also brought out a CD containing his complete works. This CD is meant for research scholars and research institutions and libraries.
