= Unnichiruthevi Charitham =

Ancient Malayalam poem

Unnichiruthevi Charitam is one of the ancient Manipravalam written during the Middle Malayalam period. Unnichiruthevi, the daughter of a dancer named Rayarambilla is the heroine in it. In the poem, Devendran comes to earth, falls in love with Unnichiruthevi, and reaches her house after seeing the sights. Unnichiruthevi Charitham, which is written between the 13th century to 15th century AD has its place in various fields like language, literature, and social and national history. It is one of the oldest works in Malayalam and is considered a work that reflects the social history of the time it was written.

== Overview ==
The poem begins by praising the legend of the temple established by Athavarma in the village of Chokiram (present-day Shukapuram), the 'Nayakamani' of Brahmin villages, and the Ardhanarishvara Thenkailanatha who was enshrined there.

It is assumed that the poet who wrote the poem belongs to Chokiram village. Manipravalakavi, the son of Chiruthevi mentioned in the book, is considered the counterpart of the poet himself. At the end of the book, mentioning 'Marayancherikerlamishramaravacha', P. V. Krishnan Nair says that the poet could be any of the Marayancheri (Maravancheri) Namboothiris. The beginning of the poem tells about the Mahakavya written by Achan about Unnichiruthevi.

== See also ==
- Unniyachi Charitham
- Manipravalam
