= Lilatilakam =

Treatise on grammar and poetics of Manipravalam language

- Original title: Līlā-tilakam
- Language: Sanskrit
- Subject: Grammar and poetics of Manipravalam
- Publication place: India
- Media type: Manuscript

Lilatilakam (IAST: Līlā-tilakam, "diadem of poetry") is a 14th-century Sanskrit-language treatise on the grammar and poetics of the Manipravalam language style, a blend of Sanskrit and early Malayalam used in the Kerala region of India.

== Date and authorship ==
Lilatilakam is an anonymous work, generally dated to the late 14th century. It is attested by two (possibly three) manuscripts and is not referenced by any other surviving pre-modern source. In 1909, Appan Thampuran published a translation of the first part of Lilatilakam in the Malayalam magazine Mangalodhayam. Later, Attoor Krishna Pisharody (A. Kṛṣṇa Piṣāraṭi) translated and published the entire treatise: in 1916, he edited the Sanskrit sutras with a Malayalam translation of the original Sanskrit commentary.

== Contents ==
Lilatilakam (literally "diadem of poetry") calls itself the only disciplinary treatise (shastra) on Manipravalam, which it describes as the "union" of Sanskrit and Kerala-bhasha (the regional language spoken in Kerala).

The text is written in Sanskrit language, in form of a series of verses with commentary; it also features examples of Manipravalam-language verses. The text is divided into eight parts called shilpam.
