= Kodungallur Kunjikkuttan Thampuran =

Indian poet (1864–1913)

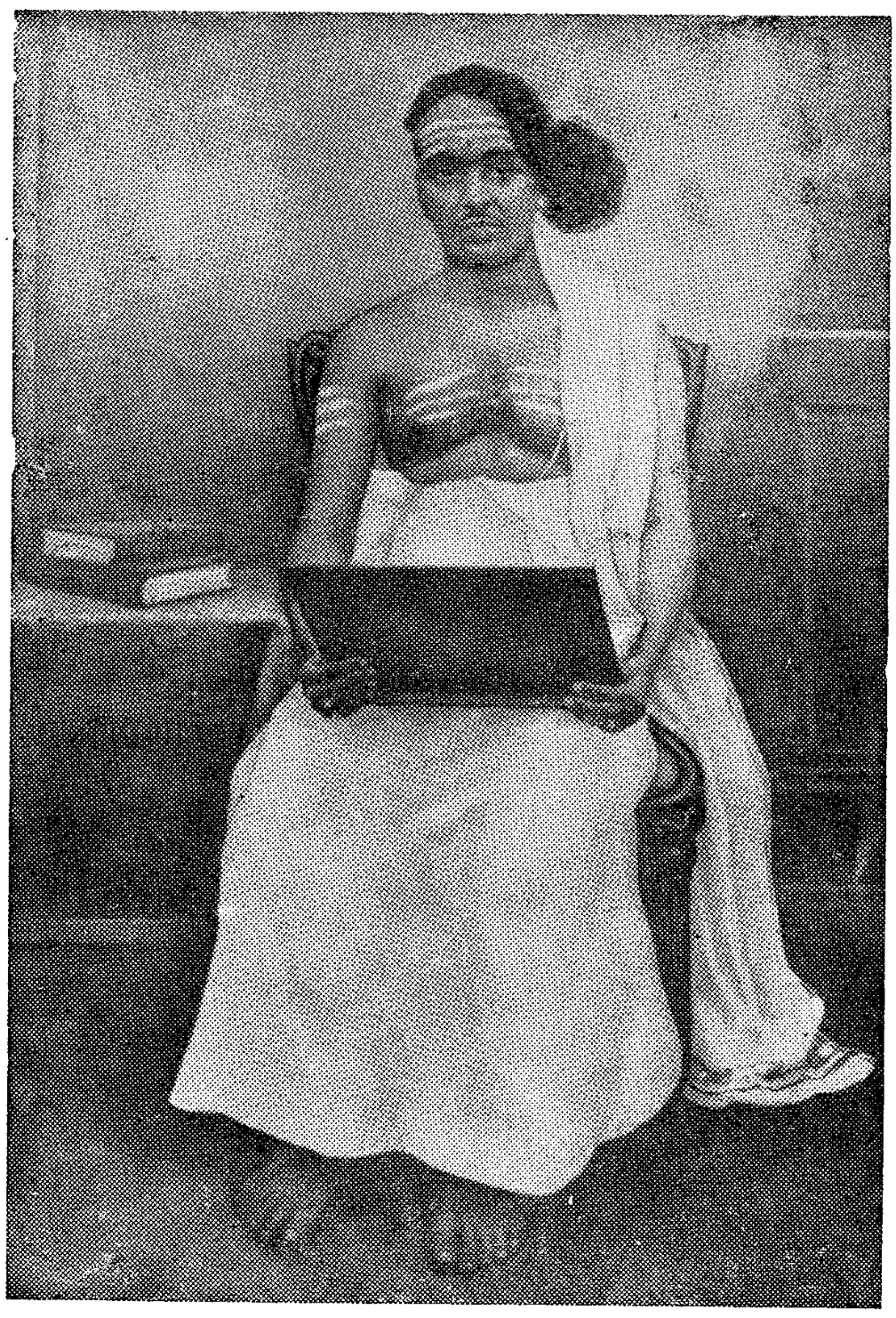
- Born: September 8, 1864
- Died: January 22, 1913 (aged 48)

Kodungallur Kunjikkuttan Thampuran (Note: also transliterated as Kotungallur Kunhikkuttan Thampuran) (1864 - 1914) was a Malayalam poet and prominent Sanskrit scholar of Kerala. His birth-name was Rama Varma. He is famous for his single-handed, word-by-word translation of entire Mahabharata within 874 days for which he gained the epithet Kerala Vyasa (lit. 'the Vyāsa of Kerala').

== Birth ==
He was born on 18 September 1864 (i.e., Malayalam era 1040 Kanni 4). His father was Venmani Achhan Nambudiripad and his mother was Kunjippilla Thampuratti. During his childhood, he was known by the nickname "Kunjikkuttan".

== Life ==
His family tutor, Valappil Unni Ashaan, was his first teacher. Later, he studied under Moonnaamkoor Godavarma Thampuran. He learned Tarka Shastra from Vidwan Kunhirama Varman Thampuran and Jyothisha from Valiya Kochunni Thampuran. He started writing poetry in ME 1047. At the age of 16, turned full-time to writing poetry. Started in Sanskrit. Turned to writing poetry in Malayalam under the influence of Venmani Achan and Venmani Mahan. He married Kodungallur Koippalli Pappiyamma at his age of 21. In ME 1062, at his age of 22, his first book "Kavibharatam" was published. At his age of 39, when Pappiyamma died, he married Thrissur Vadakke kuruppath(Kizhakke Srambil) Kuttipparu Amma. Later he married Sridevithampuratti of Zamorin family. In 1914 January 22 (i.e. on Makaram 10th of ME 1088), at his age of 49, he died.

== Literary movements ==
Kunjikkuttan Thampuran started two literary movements in Malayalam: Pacha Malayalam (Pure Malayalam) and Puranetihasa Vivartanam (Translation of Itihasas and Puranas).

=== Paccha Malayalam Movement ===
Kunjikkuttan Thampuran had many scholar friends. Their meetings, called "Kavi Sammelanam", were also famous. They began writing poems in pure Malayalam, avoiding the excessive influence of Sanskrit. This movement came to be known as the "Paccha Malayalam" Movement.

=== Translations ===
He collected and studied the ancient scriptures of India. He translated the entire Mahabharata within 874 days. In the Malayalam Era year 1068, under the leadership of C. P. Achuta Menon, an effort was made to translate the Mahabharata as kilippaattu. An advertisement appeared in the Malayala Manorama daily on ME 1068, Kanni 17. The plan was to finish the translation in five years. Whatever portion Kunhikkuttan Thampuran was assigned, he supposedly completed. However, the manuscript was never found.

After 8 to 10 years, Katatthanaattu Udayavarman Thampuran began an effort to translate Bharata Manjari by Kshemendra. Kunhikkuttan Thampuran completed the Drona Parva. The effort remained unfinished due to the death of Udayavarman Thampuran. The work was completed up to the Santi Parva.

Kunhikkuttan Thampuran started the translation single-handedly on ME 1079, Metam 25. He planned to translate 50 slokas a day during one yaama (until 9 o'clock), so that the work could be finished in 4 to 5 years. As he continued translating, his speed increased to up to 150 slokas in one yaama. The translation was completed on ME 1082, Kanni 12 (874 days). This was a metre-by-metre translation. He remained faithful even to broken metres in the original.

== Works ==
14 in Sanskrit. In Malayalam: 18 poems, 11 Ruupakams, 16 Gathas, 38 Khanda Kaavya, 3 in health, grammar, 18 translations.

- Kavibharatam
- Ambopadesham
- Dakshayaga Satakam
- Nalla Bhasha
- Thuppal Kolampi
- Palulli Charitham
- Madirasi Yathra
- Krithirathna Panchakam
- Kamsan
- Keralam
- Dronacharyar (incomplete)
- Nalacharitam
- Chandrika
- Santhanagopalam
- Seetha Svayamvaram
- Ganga Vitharanam
- Marthanda Vijayam (incomplete)
- Madusoodana Vijayam
- Ghoshayathra

=== Poems ===
- Ayoddhyakandham
- Athmabodham Pana
- Pattabhishekam Pana
- Doshavicharam Kilippattu
- Radhamadhava Yogam Vanchippattu
- Kodungallur Bhagavati Kurathippattu

=== Translations ===
- Mahabharata as Bhasha Bharatam
  - Bhagavad Gita as Bhasha Bhagavad Gita
- Kadambari
- Vikramorvashiyam
- Shukasandesham
