= Pandalam Kerala Varma =

Indian poet (1879–1919)

Mahakavi Pandalam Kerala Varma
- Pandalam Kerala Varma
- Born: January 1879; Pandalam, Travancore
- Died: June 1919 (age 40)
- Occupations: Poet, publisher, teacher
- Notable work: Rugmamgadacharitham, Vijayodayam
- Spouse: Ammukkutty Amma
- Parent(s): Perinjeri Illathu Vishnu Namboothiri, Puthankoikkal Aswathynal Thanwangi Thamburatti

Kerala Varma (January 1879 – June 1919), most commonly known as Mahakavi Pandalam Kerala Varma, was an Indian poet, scholar, and publisher. He was born in Pandalam, and belonged to the Pandalam Royal Family. He wrote two mahakavyas, more than a hundred narrative poems, translations, and children's poetry. He is widely regarded as the author of the first complete mahakavya in Malayalam. He was the owner and Chief Editor of Kavana Kaumudi, the first Malayalam periodical, which was also the first to introduce special issues in Malayalam.

== Personal life ==
Kerala Varma was born in Pandalam in 1879, to Kottayam Puthuppally Vishnu Namboothiri of the Thrikkonamangalam Desathu Perinjeri Illathu tharavad and Aswathynal Thanwangi Thamburatti of the Puthankoikkal tharavad.

He had two elder brothers and an elder sister. He also had two paternal half-brothers; Neythelloor Koikkal Makayiramnal Kerala Varma Thampuran (1846–1890) and Neythelloor Kottarathil Thrikkettanal Veera Kerala Varma Thampuran. Makayiramnal Kerala Varma Thampuran was the author of Bhoothanatholbhavam thullal and Aardra Maholsavam Sanskrit champu. Thrikkettanal Veera Kerala Varma Thampuran was the author of Rukmamgadacharitham Sanskrit poem and Banayuddham Sanskrit champu. He was also the logical reasoning guru of Pandalam Kerala Varma. Pandalam Kerala Varma's relative Malikathazhe Bharaninal Kerala Varma Thampuran (1823–1883) was an astrology and grammar expert. It is believed that he had predicted that Pandalam Kerala Varma would become famous one day. Another relative, Vadakke Kottarathil Thiruvathiranal Raja Raja Varma Valiya Thampuran (1817–1902), was the author of the hymns Dharmasathru Sathakam, Krishnaleela, Devi Sthothram, Sabarigireesa Sthothram, and Pandalam Mahadeva Sathakam. He took care of Pandalam Kerala Varma's poetic practice and grammatical studies. Thekkekkettil Kottarathil Athamnal Godavarma Valiya Thampuran (1840–1911) was the grammar guru of Pandalam Kerala Varma.

Kerala Varma started learning the alphabet at age 3 from Pandalam Achutha Warrier. After Warrier's death, Avittomnal Rama Varma Thampuran became his guru. Kerala Varma learnt Siddha Roopam, Sree Ramodantham, and Amara Kosam by age 10. Thereafter he studied the poems Sree Krishna Vilasam, Naishadheeya Charitha, Kiratharjuneeyam and plays like abhigijñānaśākuntalam. From age 17 to 24, he studied Vyulpathi Vadaparyantham logical reasoning and Praudamanoramantham grammatical lessons. Kerala Varma's upanayana was completed at the age of 14. He started writing Sanskrit poems from age 12, and Malayalam poems from age 19. He was established as a poet by the age of 20. Beside poetry, he was also skilled in other activities. In his childhood, he made a striking clock and a cycle for use in water.

Kerala Varma married Ammukkutty Amma, who was the sister of the poet Oduvil Kunhikrishna Menon in the year 1905. The couple had two sons and three daughters. In 1914, he joined SMV High School, Thiruvananthapuram as language teacher. He also bought a house at Kaithamukku and settled in Thiruvananthapuram. During this period, he along with Ulloor S. Parameswara Iyer learnt grammar and rhetorical figures under the guidance of Thuravoor Narayana Shastri. He was appointed a member on the expert panel of the Maharaja of Travancore by the then king Moolam Thirunal Rama Varma and was granted 10 rupees as salary. He was conferred "Kavi Thilakan" honour by the King of Cochin.

Kerala Varma used to visit Thiruvananthapuram every year during Navratri festival time and engage in literary discussions with Kerala Varma Valiya Koil Thampuran. His last journey with Ulloor S. Parameswara Iyer was to Kochi to receive the "Kavi Thilakan" honour. Kerala Varma was friends with Kodungallur Kochunni Thampuran, Kochi Parikshith Thampuran, and Sahridaya Thilakan Rama Pisharody.

Kerala Varma was disturbed by the unexpected deaths of his relatives and close associates in a short period. His guru Avittomnal Rama Varma Thampuran, mother, father, and brother Veera Kerala Varma Thampuran died in a span of six years. Kerala Varma died in 1919 from fever known at that time as Bombay Fever. In 1979, a collection of his writings were reprinted and published in two volumes as 'selected works'.

== Literary career ==
=== Earlier works ===
Kerala Varma's initial works were Sreekrishna Sthothram, an astakam on Dharmasastha, Kesadipada Sathakam, and Rasavilasambhanam. His first work was published in Subhashini newspaper, Changanassery in 1898. It was the completion of a poetic puzzle Kunnennu Cholvathinu Kuttamaseshamundo by Ulloor S. Parameswara Iyer. Later he published his poems in Malayala Manorama, Rasika Ranjini, Kavitha Vilasini, Dakshina Deepam, Vijnana Ratnakaram, Kerala Varma, Kerala Kesari, Bhasha Sarada, Sumangala, Aryakesari, Mahila Ratnam, Kerala Vyasan, Mangalodayam, and Vani Vilasam. He used to engage two writers to note down his recitations. He never wanted to monetise his poems. Once he quipped that he did not want to publish poems immediately after writing, but wanted to review and correct it later before sending for publication.

=== Mahakavyas ===
Kerala Varma authored 16 major works, including two mahakavyas Rukmamgadacharitham and Vijayodayam. Of these, Rukmamgadacharitham is considered his masterpiece. It was widely respected as an example of a typical mahakavya before Ulloor S. Parameswara Iyer published Umakeralam. Revealing Varma's command over the language and the medium of expression, Rukmamgadacharitham was meant for a scholarly audience. The book was first published in 1913 although it was completed five years before its publication. It contains 19 chapters.

Both mahakavyas are considered as representations of neoclassical style. Madasseri Madhava Warrier observed that Rukmamgadacharitham was a complete mahakavya in the old style and those who were familiar with that style would like it best. According to N. Krishna Pillai, Kerala Varma's mahakavyas would astonish everybody with their word control and effortless beauty. Kumaran Asan reviewed Rukmamgadacharitham in Vivekodayam magazine and described it as a great work, although his review contained praises and criticism alike. In the preface to the book, Kerala Varma wrote that he never felt any sense of pride in writing a mahakavya, but wanted to give a place to the mythological story in Kerala literature. Vijayodayam is Kerala Varma's second mahakavya. It is a relatively smaller work as it contained only eight chapters which is the minimum requirement for a mahakavya. It deals with the story of Kirata and Arjuna. While some critics do not consider it as a mahakavya, some others, most notably M. Leelavathy, T. P. Balakrishnan Nair, and T. G. Madhavan Kutty rate it as a mahakavya. It is believed that Bharavi's Kirātārjunīya was Kerala Varma's inspiration to write Vijayodayam. Ulloor S. Parameswara Iyer opined that the poem was quite enchanting.

=== Narrative poems ===
Kerala Varma's narrative poems were based on either history, mythology, or pure imagination. Marthanda Devodayam, Vancheesa Sathakam, Sreemoola Prakasika, and Sreemoolaraja Vijayam fall into the history based category. Saubhadra Niryanam, Urmila, Bheema Prabhavam, Lakshmana Pravasam, Ghatolkkachan, Subhadra, Marthya Vaibhavam, Barbareekan, Sayoojyam, and Vibheeshaabhishekam can be categorised as mythology based. Bhageerathi, Oru Kadha, Lakshmi, Oru Puravriththam, Naanikkutty, Chelapparambu are based on pure imagination.

=== Children's poetry ===
Kerala Varma wrote 35 poems for children. Kerala Varma wrote the widely popular Malayalam prayer song for children Daivame Kai Thozham. Some of his other poetry for children include Kalikkutty, Maasangal, Neram Veluthu, Thathammayum Penkuttiyum, Aana, Ponnu Thampuran, Nakshathrangal, Nazhikamani, Sundara Viddi, Ammepaksham, Kanduvo Nee, Kadannalum Theneechayum, Arivu, Manthan Chanthayil Poyathu, Jalam, Oru Tharkkam, Chinthikkaran, Payyeppayye, Kallane Killan Pidikkum, Vaayu, Oru Vanchippattu, Kallanaya Eli, Dinacharya, Kakkayum Kurukkanum, Pasu, Palliyunarthal, Prarthana, Vallamkali, and Ambili Ammavan. His poems Kaliyum Karyavum, Payyethinnal Panayum Thinnam, and Othoruma contain advice for children.

=== Translations ===
Kerala Varma translated a drama and a vyayogam from Sanskrit to Malayalam. These are Veni Samharam by Bhatta Narayana and Dootha Vakyam by Bhasa. Kerala Varma later commented that he had only respected the original authors in his translations although he never translated the works word by word. According to Ulloor S. Parameswara Iyer, the translations were excellent and were comparable to Kodungallur Kunjikkuttan Thampuran's translation of Ascharya Choodamani. He further added that it required remarkable skills to translate the works of Bhatta Narayana at the same quality.

=== Hymns and essays ===
Although his ancestral deity is Lord Ayyappa, Kerala Varma wrote majority of hymns in praise of Devi. Vani Panchakam, Gauristhavam, Devi Dasakam, and Aryashtakam are such works. He also wrote hymns such as Ramesa Dasakam in praise of Lord Vishnu. Kerala Varma wrote essays rarely. Two of his essays are Loka Vaichithyam and Iravan, which are noted for their humour content and the writer's observation. Loka Vaichithryam explains the strange aspects of the world and poetry. Iravan discusses the mythological story of the tactical self-sacrifice of Iravan planned by Sree Krishna to sustain the fame of Arjuna. Generally, Kerala Varma's works uphold moral values.

=== Other works ===
Kerala Varma's narrative poem Sreemoolaraja Vijayam is essentially lyrics for an Ottamthullal, although it did not have the ease and rhythm of traditional thullal lyrics. This contains the chronological life events of Sree Moolam Thirunal, from birth to his 60th birthday. His Yathra Kavyam is a neoclassical work which narrates his personal experience of visiting Sabarimala along traditional route, following traditional custom and rituals. This is an incomplete work.

=== Critical reception ===
Kerala Varma had a vast vocabulary. According to his biographer A. D. Hari Sarma, Kerala Varma never faced an issue in finding the right choice of word and that once he started writing, apt words used to appear as the flow of river Ganges. Vallathol described him as "Padam kondu panthaadunna Pandalam" (One who juggles with words). Kerala Varma was severely criticised by Kumaran Asan in the literary periodical Vivekodayam. Joseph Mundassery also criticised Kerala Varma for his poetic style. P. V. Krishna Warrier criticised Kerala Varma in a special issue of Kavana Kaumudi.

Ulloor S. Parameswara Iyer called Kerala Varma "Prithveesan" for his uncanny ability to write poems in Prithvi metre. He also remarked that Kerala Varma had absolute control over all words in Malayalam and Sanskrit. Muloor S. Padmanabha Panicker compared Kerala Varma to Garuda in his Kaviramayanam.

== Publishing career ==
Kerala Varma used to publish a fortnightly periodical Kavana Kaumudi, which contained poetry and contemporary issues. The periodical was published from Pandalam. It was the first Malayalam periodical. The first issue of Kavana Kaumudi was published on 4 November 1904, which was 1 Vrischikam 1080 as per the Malayalam calendar. Kerala Varma was the owner and Chief Editor of the periodical and P. K. Narayanan Namboothiri was the publisher and manager. The editorials in the periodical discussed social, political, and contemporary issues. These were mainly targeted at corruption and inefficiency of administration. The periodical contained advertisements also. All contents in the periodical including advertisements were in poetic form. The periodical also contained a column Balopadesam for children. Poets like Ulloor S. Parameswara Iyer opposed the idea of such a periodical initially, but later praised it and wrote in it.

Kavana Kaumudi was printed on a broadsheet with eight pages and four columns on each page. It was published on the 1st and 15th of all Malayalam months. The earlier issues of the periodical were printed at Suvarnaratnaprabha Press, Kayamkulam. After the first three years, Kavana Kaumudi became a monthly publication. In 1905, the printing of the periodical was shifted to Kerala Kalpadrumam Press in Thrissur, which was managed by Vallathol Narayana Menon. In March 1910, the printing was further shifted to Lakshmisahayam Press at Kottakkal. The running of Kavana Kaumudi put Kerala Varma into financial crisis. Later, P. V. Krishna Warrier joined as the co-editor of Kavana Kaumudi. Following the death of Kerala Varma, Warrier became the Chief Editor of the periodical. Warrier introduced a book review column in the periodical by the name Njangalude Vayanamuri. Later, advertisements and book reviews started appearing in prose. Several poems from Vallathol's Sahitya Manjari and G. Sankara Kurup's Sahitya Kauthukam were first published in Kavana Kaumudi. The periodical also carried several translations of English romantic poems.

Kerala Varma used to write poetic editorials in Kavana Kaumudi. Among those who wrote on Kavana Kaumudi were Kerala Varma Valiya Koil Thampuran, A. R. Raja Raja Varma, Punnasseri Nambi Neelakanta Sharma, Kodungallur Kunjikkuttan Thampuran, K. C. Kesava Pillai, Vallathol Narayana Menon, Ulloor S. Parameswara Iyer, Muloor S. Padmanabha Panicker, Kuttippuram, and Kochunni Thampuran. The earlier poems of Nalappattu Narayana Menon, G. Sankara Kurup, and V. C. Balakrishna Panicker were also published in this periodical. Among the famous poets of that time, only Kumaran Asan had not written in the periodical.

Beside the regular issues, Kavana Kaumudi introduced special issues on nine occasions. It was the first time a special issue was being printed for a Malayalam publication. The special issues were titled Bhasha Vilasam. The first special issue was published in 1914 and the last in 1930. The special issues contained both poems and prose. The first special issue contained astakams by famous poets based on the subject train. The periodical was in print for 11 more years after the death of Kerala Varma, until it stopped in 1930.

Kavana Kaumudi is considered to have served as a unifying factor, surpassing the regional differences and parochial discriminations that existed in the early 20th century. Poet O. N. V. Kurup observed that Kavana Kaumudi ushered the poets of Kerala who were split into three regions, to a single platform. Even Kumaran Asan who was reluctant to publish his poems through the periodical, wrote that it would not be a mistake to consider Kavana Kaumudi as a standard for understanding the prosperity of poetic skills in Malayalam. In the souvenir published during the birth centenary of Kerala Varma, poet Cherukunnam Purushothaman observed that none of the obstacles such as the complexity of the topic, demand for fast completion, or lack of time for revision or correction marred Kerala Varma's priceless editorials. Sahitya Akademi, New Delhi has published a Monograph of Pandalam Kerala Varma ( by P. Ravi Varma) in 2013

== Other notable works ==
- Katha Kaumudi
- Sookthimaala
- Sabarimalayathra
- Shumbha Nishumbha Vadham
- Bhujamga Sandesham

== Pandalam Kerala Varma Award ==
The Pandalam Kerala Varma Smaraka Samithi is an association set up in remembrance of the poet. The Samithi, with the support of Pandalathu Kottaram Nirvahaka Sanghom (Pandalam Palace Managing Committee) offers two awards; a literary award to honour excellence in poetry and a media award to honour excellence in editorial. The award is known by the name Mahakavi Pandalam Kerala Varma Award. The award for poetry consists of a cash prize of INR 15,001, plaque, and citation, and that for media consists of INR 10,001, plaque, and citation. Media Awards were given to Editorials of Malayalam Newspapers and Periodicals from 2003 to 2012. From 2013 onwards the Media Award is given to the columns published/telecasted by journalists.

| Year | Recipient | Award |
|---|---|---|
| 1979 | O. N. V. Kurup | Literary |
| 2003 | Ayyappa Paniker | Literary |
| 2003 | Madhyamam | Media |
| 2004 | Vishnunarayanan Namboothiri | Literary |
| 2004 | Deepika | Media |
| 2005 | K. Satchidanandan | Literary |
| 2005 | Mathrubhumi | Media |
| 2006 | Kadammanitta Ramakrishnan | Literary |
| 2006 | Kerala Kaumudi | Media |
| 2007 | Akkitham Achuthan Namboothiri | Literary |
| 2007 | Deshabhimani | Media |
| 2008 | Sugathakumari | Literary |
| 2009 | Attoor Ravi Varma | Literary |
| 2010 | D. Vinayachandran | Literary |
| 2011 | K. G. Sankara Pillai | Literary |
| 2012 | Ezhacherry Ramachandran | Literary |
| 2013 | Kavalam Narayana Panicker | Literary |
| 2013 | Thomas Jacob | Media |
| 2014 | Chemmanam Chacko | Literary |
| 2014 | T. J. S. George | Media |
| 2015 | V. Madhusoodanan Nair | Literary |
| 2015 | T. N. Gopakumar | Media |
| 2016 | Prabha Varma | Literary |
| 2016 | Jose Panachippuram | Media |
| 2017 | Kureepuzha Sreekumar | Literary |
| 2017 | N. P. Rajendran | Media |
| 2018 | Rafeeq Ahamed | Literary |
| 2018 | G. Sekharan Nair | Media |
