= K. C. Kesava Pillai =

Indian composer and poet (1868–1914)

- Born: February 4, 1868; Travancore (present-day Paravur, Kerala, India)
- Died: September 2, 1914 (aged 46); Kerala, India
- Occupations: Teacher, poet, musician
- Spouse(s): Kalyani Amma; Nanikutty Amma
- Relatives: Valiyavelichathu Veettil Raman Pillai (father); Desathu Lakshmy Amma (mother); R. Narayana Panickar
- Writing career
- Notable works: Kesaviyam; Adimalarina; Asanna Marana Chitha Sathakam; Sadarama; Bhashanarayaniyam

Kanakku Chembakaraman Kesava Pillai (1868–1914) was an Indian composer of Carnatic music and a poet of Malayalam literature. He was the Poet Laureate of Travancore and was known for Kesaveeyam, a mahakavya in Malayalam, two attakathas and several bhajans and kirtans. He also translated the Sanskrit text, Narayaniyam, into Malayalam under the title, Bhashanarayaniyam.

== Biography ==
K. C. Kesava Pillai (Note: K. C. stands for Kanakku Chembakaraman, a title given to Pillai's maternal family by the Maharajah of Travancore) was born on February 4, 1868, in Travancore kingdom to Valiyavelichathu Veettil Raman Pillai and Desathu Lakshmy Amma. His early schooling was at Paravur Malayalam School where he studied up to 5th standard and followed it up with Sanskrit studies under the tutelage of Paravur Kesavan Asan and grammar studies under Enakkattu Rajaraja Varma. As a boy, Pillai regularly watched Kathakali and learnt the basics of Kathakali literature, costumes and mudras, besides gaining proficiency in music. Aged 15, he wrote his first attakadha, Prahladacharitham. Simultaneously, he studied English with the help of a few friends while working as a Sanskrit teacher at a Vaidya School. In 1897, he joined as a Sanskrit teacher at a Malayalam school in Kollam but shifted to an English school in 1901 before moving to Thiruvananthapuram in 1901 as the teacher of Velayudhan Thampi, the son of Sree Moolam Thirunal, the then Maharajah of Travancore.

Pillai married Kalyani Amma in 1890 but she died after two years. He married again in 1894; Nanikutty Amma, his father's niece, was the bride. A close associate of Pandalam Kerala Varma and A. R. Raja Raja Varma, Pillai died on September 4, 1913, at the age of 45 years. On account of his musical and poetical achievements, he was awarded the title of Sarasa Gayaka Kavimani by Kerala Varma Valiya Koil Thampuran. Noted writer and Sahitya Akademi Award winner, R. Narayana Panickar, was his son-in-law. Dr.Sreenath.P.R, Neurosurgeon at KMCIMS is his relative.

== Legacy ==
=== Literary work ===
Kesava Pillai's body of literary work, written in Sanskrit and Malayalam languages, comprises an epic, three attakathas for Kathakali, two Thullal songs, eleven short poems, six khandakavyas, four plays, two stories and four commentaries. He wrote Prahlaada Charitham, later renamed, Hiranyasuravadham, the first of this three attakathas, when he was only 15. It was reported that Pillai, with his advice, assisted A. R. Rajaraja Varma in writing Vritha Manjari. His plays, such as Lakshmikalyanam, were reported to portray the social life of the Nair community of his times. Kesaviyam, a mahakavya and Kerala Varma Vilasam, a poem on the life of Kerala Varma Valiya Koil Thampuran are two of his major works. Kesaviyam has been written without observing the dvitīyākṣara prāsa (second syllable rhyming), which was in vogue during those times.

=== Music ===
Pillai composed six compositions, including Ganamalika, which has two volumes, besides over 100 songs. Sadarama, one of his compositions, is composed in the form of a Geya nataka, while Sangitamalika is an ensemble of 42 songs. The majority of his songs are devotional and are composed in ragas such as Todi, Sankarabharanam, Mohanam, Kapi, Kalyani and Pantuvarali. One of his songs, "Omanappennallayo...", has been reworked by the Malayalam music director, M. Jayachandran, for the 2010 film, Kadaksham.

== Bibliography ==
=== Attakadha ===
- Prahlaada Charitham, later renamed, Hiranyasuravadham
- Soorapadmasuravadham
- Sreekrishnavijayam

=== Poetry ===
- Asanna Marana Chinta Satakam (Reflections of a Dying Man) although written for a competition, is a touching lyrical monologue with a predominant elegiac tone and anticipates the Khandakavyas or shorter poems of the poets of the renaissance. It has an underground connection with C. S. Subramanian Potti's Oruvilapam (A Lament: 1903), V. C. Balakrishna Panicker's Oruvilapam (A Lament:1908) and even Kumaran Asan's Veena Poovu (A Fallen Flower:1907) which may be thought of an elegy in disguise.
- Adimalarina: A ragamalika in four languages: Malayalam, Tamil, English and Sanskrit.
- Satya Swaroopavibho in raga Sankarabharana
- Bhajikka Nee Ramane in Mohanam
- Koti Divakara in Dhanyasi
- Nana Jaathikal in Kambhoji
- Vande Maatharam in Sindhubhairavi
- Vande Maatharam in Kuntalavarali
- Kamalanatha in Thodi
- Sree vasudeva in Kāpi
- Sreemoolarajavijayam, 1894, submitted to Sree Moolam Thirunal Maharaja.
- Aasannamaranachintasatakam: a work consisting of 104 slokas (songs in Carnatic music or Indian music praising God) in Saardoolavikriditham.
- Kerala Bhashaa Narayaneeyam: a translation of Narayaneeyam in Malayalam.
- Subhashitha Ratnakaram
- Abhinayamalika
- Kesaviyam: A mahakavya modeled on the Sanskrit pattern, adhering to the rules of structure and style of the classical rhetorician, Dandi.
- Sadarama (A popular Tamil musical play)
- A selection of attakkathas.

=== Plays ===
- Lekshmi Kalyanam
- Raghava Madhavam
- Vikramorvaseeyam
- Sadaarama

=== Other works ===
- K.C. Kesava Pillai. Jyothisha Gurubhoothan. Mathrubhumi.

=== Musical compositions ===
- Sangeetha manjari and Sthavaratnavali: both contain kritis and bhajan songs
- Sangeethamaalika and
- Eswarasthothranga
- Sthavaratnamalika
- K. C. Kesava Pillai. Maya Gopala Bala (in Sanskrit). Raaga. Archived from the original on 21 March 2019. "Raaga : Kaapi, Thaala: Aadi thala"

=== Works on Kesava Pillai ===
- A. Alice (2014). K C Kesava Pillai: Kavithayude Samkramana Kaalam (in Malayalam). National Book Stall. p. 144. Archived from the original on 27 March 2019. "A study on the literary contributions of poet K C Kesava Pillai"
