= Vaikkath Pachu Moothathu =

Indian writer

Parameswaran Moothathu
- Born: 1814; Vaikom, Kottayam
- Died: 1883
- Occupations: Ayurvedic physician, writer, historian, astrologer
- Writing career
- Genre: Literature
- Notable works: Hradyapriya, Sukhasadhakam

Vaikathu Paramesvara Sivadvija, better known as Vaikath Pachu Moothathu, was a scholar of the princely state of Travancore. A scholar of Ayurveda, Sanskrit, Malayalam and history, and established the first institution for learning the traditional Indian ayurvedic medicine, which developed to become Government Ayurveda College, Thiruvananthapuram. He wrote the first children's literature in Malayalam language named Balabhooshanam, wrote first autobiography in Malayalam and also wrote first grammar book in Malayalam.

== Early life ==
Moothathu was born on 25 Edavam 989 Kolla era (1814 AD) in Vaikom, Travancore state, and was adopted by a Moothathu family called Vattapalli Matom at Suchindrum to perform temple rites and rituals. The family lacked a male child who could do those duties.

The family of Vattapalli Matom is the Tantri of the Suchindrum Thanumalayan temple from where one male member (usually the eldest) must perform the rites and rituals of the temple. It is said that up to the age of 11, Moothathu had only elementary knowledge of the alphabets but during his stay at Suchindrum, his knowledge in arts, literature and traditional sciences rose to great heights. He wrote more than twenty books in Sanskrit and in Malayalam.

He is known as the first person to introduce the idea of lottery as a means of fund raising in the princely state of Travancore. His self-portrait, which he had painted by looking at his image in a mirror was also well known.

== Learning ==
Moothathu learned Ayurveda, a system of traditional medicine native to India. He was influenced by Vahata's (Vagbhata) Astangahridaya and started learning it. He learned Astangahrdaya in the Kollam Era 1018 (Kanni 2) and completed on the 29th of Thulam 1018 (1843 AD).

He wrote Sri Rama Charitram Mahakavyam (1037 Kollam era), Thiruvitamcore Charitram (narrating the legends and facts up to the 1036 Kollam Era (1861 AD) i.e. up to the period of Maharaja Ayilyam Thirunal). Hradyapriya (1040 Kollam Era) 1865 AD and Sukhasadhakam(1057 Kollam Era) 1882 AD are two important works by Sri Pachu Moothathu on Ayurveda and can be considered as a pragmatic commentary of Vahata's Astangahridaya. He insisted in transferring the knowledge of Ayurveda to ordinary people and his book Sukhasadhagam is an attempt in this direction.

He was the Kottaram Vaidyan (official ayurvedic physician) of Travancore and was awarded with the Veera Sringala (golden bracelet) by the maharaja, Ayilyam Thirunal.

== See also ==
- Thanumalayan Temple
