= Parakkai Lake =

- Location within India
- Location: Kanniyakumari district, Tamil Nadu, India
- Coordinates: 8°8′52″N 77°27′25″E
- Type: lake

Parakkai Lake is a lake in Kanniyakumari district in the state of Tamil Nadu, India. It is located near the southern tip of India, just to the north of Parakkai village and west of the town of Suchindram.
