= Vattapalli Matom =

Vattappalli Madam is located in Suchindram, Kanyakumari District, Tamil Nadu, India. Suchindram is one of the famous Shivaite and Vaishnavite temple places of the erstwhile Hindu kingdom of Travancore. It is about 7 km from Nagercoil, and about 75 km from Thiruvananthapuram, Kerala. It is one of the oldest houses in Suchindram village and the family is the chief priests of the Suchindram Thanumalayan Temple. The river Pazhayaar flows nearby and the temple pond Theppakulam is in very close proximity to the house.

== See also ==
- Suchindram
- Vaikkath Pachu Moothathu
