= K. V. Thikkurissi =

Indian poet (1932–2021)

- Born: 1932; Marthandam
- Died: 5 May 2021; Thiruvananthapuram
- Occupations: Poet; writer; teacher

K. V. Thikkurissi (born V. V. Krishna Varman Nair; 1932 – 5 May 2021) was a Malayalam author who wrote books in different genres, including poetry, children's fiction, biography and travelogues.

== Biography ==
Born in Thikkurissi in Marthandam, he started his literary career in Thiruvananthapuram following the separation of Kanyakumari from Thiruvananthapuram. He won an award from the Kendra Sahitya Akademi for his poem Bhakranangal in 1960. His other noted works include biographies of R. Narayana Panickar and Chattambi Swamikal and children's stories about Vikramaditya. He was a member of the Kerala Sahitya Akademi, Kerala Sangeetha Nataka Akademi and Kalamandalam. He also worked as a high school teacher in different schools in Thiruvananthapuram. He died on 5 May 2021 from COVID-19.
