= Ezhacherry Ramachandran =

Indian writer

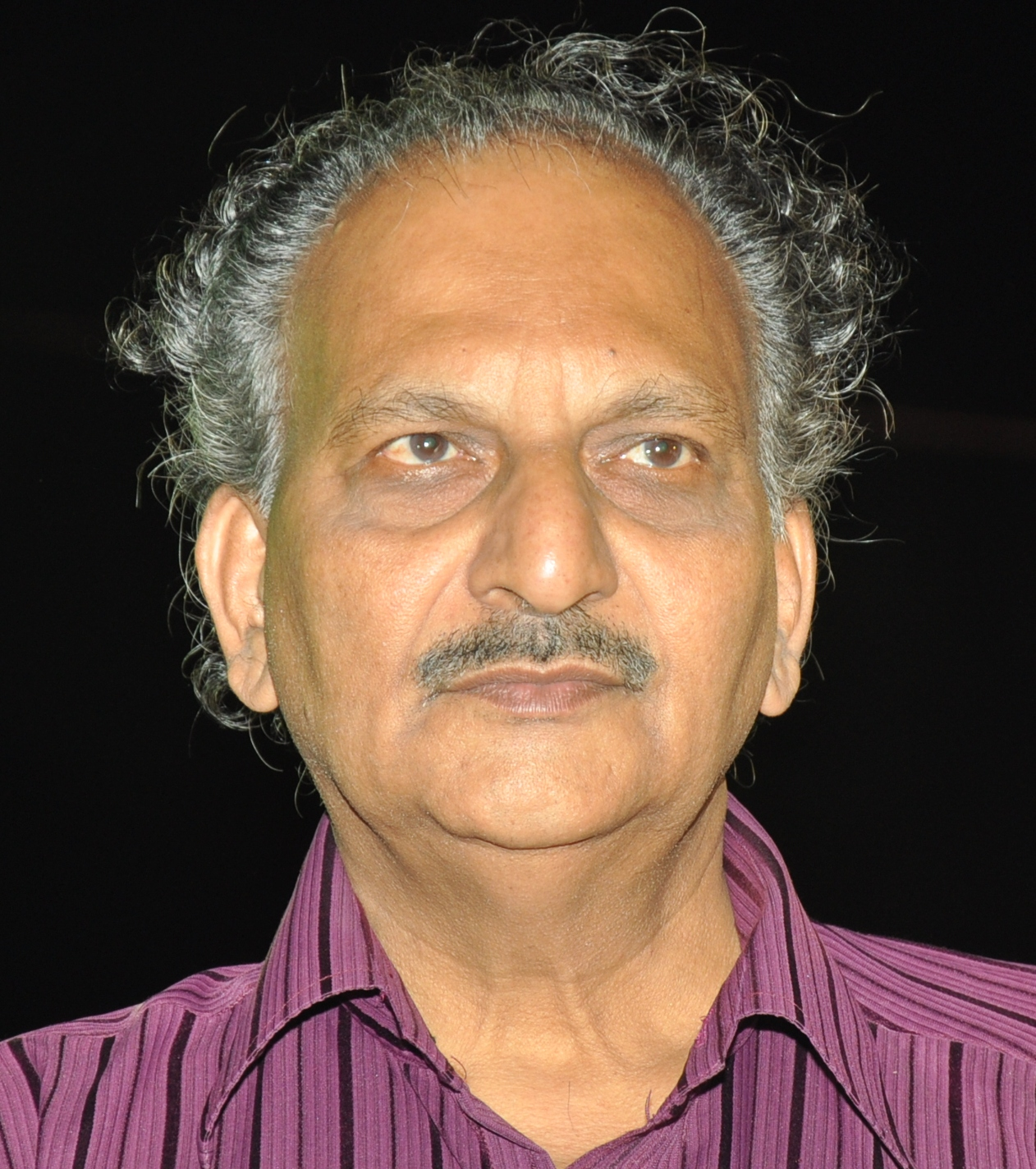
- Born: 1944 (age 81–82); Ezhacherry, Kottayam district, India
- Occupations: Poet; lyricist; journalist
- Writing career
- Notable work: Enniloode
- Notable awards: Kerala Sahitya Akademi Award (2008); Vayalar Award (2020)

Ezhacherry Ramachandran (born 1944) is a Malayalam poet, lyricist and journalist. He has penned lyrics for several Malayalam movies and albums. In 2020, he won the Vayalar Award.

== Personal life ==
Ramachandran was born at Ezhacherry near Pala, Kerala. He studied at S.V.N.S.S High School, Edanad. He was the chief editor of Deshabhimani weekly. He has won the best lyricist award for professional dramas several times. He has also written more than 30 film songs. Chandana Manivathil from the 1988 film Marikkunnilla Njan, composed by Raveendran and sung by G. Venugopal is the most popular among them.

== Awards ==
- 1995: Kerala State Bala Sahitya Institute Award
- 2008: Kerala Sahitya Akademi Award for Poetry – Enniloode
- 2015: Kerala Sahitya Akademi Award for Children's Literature – Sunny Cherukkanum Sangeetha Pengalum
- 2015: Abu Dhabi Sakthi Award for Poetry – Ilathumbile Vajradaaham
- 2016: Asan Poetry PrizeBalan Foundation Award

Punalur BL

- 2020: Vayalar Award – Oru Virginian Veyilkaalam
- 2020: I. V. Das Award
- Ulloor Award
- Moloor Award
- A. P. Kalaykkad Award
- S. B. T. Award
- Nimishakavi Achal R. Velu Pillai Award
- Ezhumangalam Vamadevan Award
- Pandalam Kerala Varma Award
- M. S. Rudran Award
