= T. N. Gopakumar =

Indian journalist

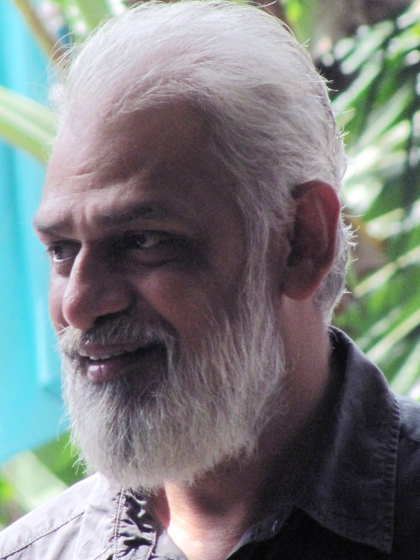
- Born: 1957; Suchindram, Kanyakumari, India
- Died: 30 January 2016 (aged 58–59); Thiruvananthapuram, Kerala, India
- Other name: T.N.G
- Occupations: Journalist; Writer; Film director
- Spouse: Heather Gopakumar
- Children: 2
- Parents: P. Neelakanda Sharma; L. Thankamma

T. N. Gopakumar (1957 – 30 January 2016) was an Indian journalist. He was the news editor-in-chief of Asianet News. Gopakumar was also the producer and anchorperson of the popular weekly programme Kannadi on Asianet.

== Personal life ==
Gopakumar was born in 1957 in Shuchindram to Vattappallimadam P. Neelakanda Sharma, a Sucheendram Temple Sthanikar, and L. Thankamma. He had two siblings- T. N. Vijayam and T. N. Sreekumar. He was married to Heather Gopakumar and the couple had two daughters, Gayathri and Kaveri.

== Career ==
He began his career with Indian Express and evolved as a journalist through tenures in Mathrubhumi, News Time, The Statesman and The Independent. During his association with the BBC, he was called in to take charge of the news division in the newly formed Asianet television channel.

Gopakumar also contributed to the literature and cinema of Malayalam. Apart from many articles and columns in periodicals, he wrote more than fourteen books. The premier among them were VOLgA tharam_gangngaL(വോൾഗാ തരംഗങ്ങൾ), AkampaTi sarppangngal(അകമ്പടി സർപ്പങ്ങൾ) and shudran (ശൂദ്രൻ). Notable among the many accolades he earned were the 1998 award for the best autobiography for shucheendram rEkhakaL (ശുചീന്ദ്രം രേഖകൾ) and 2011 award for the best travelogue in Malayalam, both from Kerala Sahitya Akademy for the work vOLgA tharam_gangngaL, Mahakavi Pandalam Kerala Varma Media Award (Kannadi-Asianet-, Shangumukham-Kalakaumudi) and the FCCJ Asian Journalist Award from Tokyo. He also directed the film Jeevan Masai. vErukaL, a noteworthy serial from Doordarshan, was directed by him.

He was also one of the favourite choices for mimicry artists in Kerala to imitate, due to his distinctive articulation of words and high bass voice.

== Filmography ==
as director

- 2001- Jeevan Masai starring- Nedumudi Venu, Kavya Madhavan

== Death ==
Gopakumar died in a private hospital in Thiruvananthapuram on 30 January 2016 at 3:50 AM, aged 58. He was suffering from cancer and was undergoing treatment for several months. He was cremated with full state honours at Santhikavadam Crematorium. Being an atheist, there were no religious customs followed at his cremation. He is survived by his wife and two daughters.
