= A. R. Raja Raja Varma =

Indian poet and linguist (1863–1918)

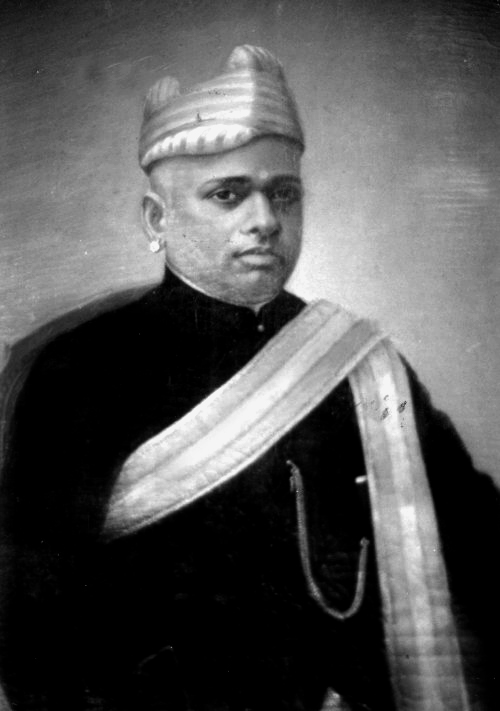

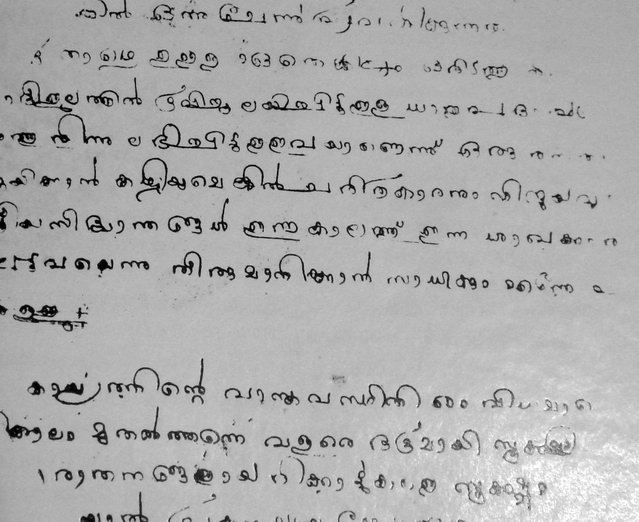
A. R. Raja Raja Varma handwriting

A. R. Raja Raja Varma (1863–1918) was an Indian poet, grammarian, and Professor of Oriental Languages at Maharaja's College (present University College Thiruvananthapuram.

== Life ==
A. R. Raja Raja Varma was part of the royal family of erstwhile Parappanad, Malappuram district. Rajaraja Varma Koyi Thampuran was born in February 1863 at the Lakshmipuram Palace in Changanacherry to mother Kunjikkavu Thampuratti and father Vasudevan Namboodiri.

Later in his life, Raja Raja Varma became one the first survivors of the very first car accident in India. Raja Raja Varma, along with his uncle Kerala Varma Valiya Koyil Thampuran, was travelling via car on 20 September 1914 when a stray dog jumped in front of their vehicle near Kayamkulam causing the driver to lose control which sent the car tumbling. Kerala Varma suffered chest trauma and died two days later on 22 September becoming the first victim of any car accident in India while Raja Raja Varma escaped with minor injuries.

A.R Raja Raja Varma died in 1918.

== Work ==
Varma wrote widely in Sanskrit and Malayalam. He is known as Kerala Panini for his contributions to Malayalam grammar. Varma was the moving spirit behind the great literary renaissance in Kerala in the Golden Age of Malayalam literature. Says Ulloor of A.R. Rajaraja Varma, "While others embellished the walls of the mansion of Malayalam literature with their paintings and drawings, A.R. worked both on its foundation and dome and made it a long enduring and imposing structure for the benefit of the people of Kerala. His fame rests on this architectural accomplishment and is bound to last forever".

== Major works ==
=== On grammar and rhetoric ===
His important works are Kerala Panineeyam, Bhashabhooshanam, Vritha Manjari and Sahitya Sahyam, the last of which introduced English-style punctuation to Malayalam.

=== Poems ===
- Bhangavilaapam
- Malayavilasam
- Angalasamrajyam

=== Translations ===
- Bhasha Megha Dootu
- Bhasha Kumara Sambhavam
- Malayala Sakuntalam
- Malavikagnimitram
- Charudattam
