= Malayalam grammar =

Grammar of the Indian Malayalam language

Malayalam belongs to the Dravidian language family and features an agglutinative grammatical structure. It typically adheres to a subject–object–verb (SOV) sentence pattern, though alternative arrangements are employed to add emphasis. Nouns undergo inflection to indicate case and number, whereas verbs are conjugated to express tense, mood, and causativity. In archaic forms, verb conjugation additionally reflected grammatical person, gender, number, and polarity. Meanwhile, adjectives, adverbs, postpositions, and conjunctions remain invariable and never inflect.

== Nouns ==
The declension paradigms for several frequent nouns and pronouns are detailed below. Because Malayalam functions as an agglutinative language, clearly separating distinct cases and establishing their exact count is challenging, though seven or eight are typically recognized. Alveolar plosives and nasals (even though modern Malayalam script does not differentiate the latter from the dental nasal) are indicated with a macron below, in accordance with the standard National Library at Kolkata Romanization system.

=== Pronouns ===
There are three persons – first, second, and third. The first person has three forms – singular, inclusive plural (i.e. speaker, listener, and possibly others), and exclusive plural (i.e. speaker and others, but not the listener). The second person has three forms – singular informal, singular formal and plural. Of these, the singular formal and plural forms are similar. A fourth form ('respectful' or 'official') is sometimes used in certain official documents and announcements.

The third person has eight forms – proximal and distal forms of singular masculine, singular feminine, singular neutral and plural. The masculine and feminine genders are used for humans and anthropomorphised non-humans. Non-living objects, plants and most animals take the neutral gender. The plural form is used for multiple objects of any gender. The plural form can also be used for a single person to show respect or because the gender is unknown or irrelevant.

Personal Pronoun
			singular	plural
1st person	Exclusive		ഞാൻ ñān̠ I	ഞങ്ങൾ ñaṅṅaḷ we
1st person	Inclusive		ഞാൻ ñān̠ I	നാം / നമ്മൾ nām / nammaḷ we
2nd person	Informal		നീ nī you	നിങ്ങൾ niṅṅaḷ you (all)
2nd person	Formal		നിങ്ങൾ niṅṅaḷ you	നിങ്ങൾ niṅṅaḷ you (all)
2nd person	'Respectful' / 'Official'		താങ്കൾ tāṅkaḷ you	നിങ്ങൾ niṅṅaḷ you (all)
3rd person	Proximal	Masculine	ഇവൻ ivan̠ (this) he	ഇവർ ivar̠ (this) they
3rd person	Proximal	Feminine	ഇവൾ ivaḷ (this) she	ഇവർ ivar̠ (this) they
3rd person	Proximal	Neutral	ഇത് itŭ this/it	ഇവ iva these
3rd person	Distal	Masculine	അവൻ avan̠ (that) he	അവർ avar̠ (that) they
3rd person	Distal	Feminine	അവൾ avaḷ (that) she	അവർ avar̠ (that) they
3rd person	Distal	Neutral	അത് atŭ that/it	അവ ava those
3rd person	Reflexive		താൻ tān̠ himself	താങ്കൾ tāṅkaḷ themselves തങ്ങൾ taṅṅaḷ themselves

- These are the commonly used pronouns though in total they have rarer synonyms and dialectal/colloquial forms, for example 2SG "you" can have around over 10 forms like nī, niṅṅaḷ, tāṉ, tāṅkaḷ, aṅṅŭ, tvaṁ, sanskritic gendered bhavāṉ, bhavati, dialectal for nī: ī, iyyŭ, ijjŭ, ji etc. Some colloquial dialects use avaṉmār̠, avaḷmār̠ as (dist.) 3Pl. masculine and feminine pronouns.

=== Cases ===
Vocative forms are given in parentheses after the nominative, as the only pronominal vocatives that are used are the third person ones, which only occur in compounds.

Singular
Case വിഭക്തി	1st person	2nd person		3rd person (distal) (Note: For proximal form, replace the initial 'a' with an 'i'.)		
Case വിഭക്തി	1st person	informal	formal	masculine	feminine	non-human
Nominative നിർദ്ദേശിക	ഞാൻ ñāṉ	നീ nī	നിങ്ങൾ niṅṅaḷ	അവൻ avaṉ (voc. avaṉē)	അവൾ avaḷ (voc. avaḷē)	അത് atŭ (voc. atiṉē)
Accusative പ്രതിഗ്രാഹിക	എന്നെ eṉṉe	നിന്നെ niṉṉe	നിങ്ങളെ niṅṅaḷe	അവനെ avaṉe	അവളെ avaḷe	അതിനെ atiṉe
Genitive സംബന്ധിക	എന്റെ/എന്നുടെ/എൻ eṉṟe/eṉṉuṭe/eṉ	നിന്റെ/നിന്നുടെ/നിൻ niṉṟe/niṉṉuṭe/niṉ	നിങ്ങളുടെ niṅṅaḷuṭe	അവന്റെ/അവനുടെ avaṉṟe/avaṉuṭe	അവളുടെ avaḷuṭe	അതിന്റെ atiṉṟe
Dative ഉദ്ദേശിക	എനിക്ക് eṉikkŭ	നിനക്ക് niṉakkŭ	നിങ്ങൾക്ക് niṅṅaḷkkŭ	അവന് avaṉŭ	അവൾക്ക് avaḷkkŭ	അതിന് atiṉŭ
Instrumental പ്രായോജിക	എന്നാൽ eṉṉāl	നിന്നാൽ niṉṉāl	നിങ്ങളാൽ niṅṅaḷāl	അവനാൽ avaṉāl	അവളാൽ avaḷāl	അതിനാൽ atiṉāl
Locative ആധാരിക	എന്നിൽ eṉṉil	നിന്നിൽ niṉṉil	നിങ്ങളിൽ niṅṅaḷil	അവനിൽ avaṉil	അവളിൽ avaḷil	അതിൽ atil
Sociative സംയോജിക	എന്നോട് eṉṉōṭŭ	നിന്നോട് niṉṉōṭŭ	നിങ്ങളോട് niṅṅaḷōṭŭ	അവനോട് avaṉōṭŭ	അവളോട്‌ avaḷōṭŭ	അതിനോട് atiṉōtŭ
Notes:

Plural
Case വിഭക്തി	1st person		2nd person	3rd person
Case വിഭക്തി	exclusive	inclusive	2nd person	3rd person
Nominative നിർദ്ദേശിക	ഞങ്ങൾ ñaṅṅaḷ	നമ്മൾ/നാം nammaḷ/nām	നിങ്ങൾ niṅṅaḷ	അവർ avaṟ (voc. avarē)
Accusative പ്രതിഗ്രാഹിക	ഞങ്ങളെ ñaṅṅaḷe	നമ്മളെ/നമ്മെ nammaḷe/namme	നിങ്ങളെ niṅṅaḷe	അവരെ avare
Genitive സംബന്ധിക	ഞങ്ങളുടെ ñaṅṅaḷuṭe	നമ്മളുടെ/നമ്മുടെ nammaḷuṭe/nammuṭe	നിങ്ങളുടെ niṅṅaḷuṭe	അവരുടെ avaruṭe
Dative ഉദ്ദേശിക	ഞങ്ങൾക്ക് ñaṅṅaḷkkŭ	നമ്മൾക്ക്/നമുക്ക് nammaḷkkŭ/namukkŭ	നിങ്ങൾക്ക് niṅṅaḷkkŭ	അവർക്ക് avaṟkkŭ
Instrumental പ്രായോജിക	ഞങ്ങളാൽ ñaṅṅaḷāl	നമ്മളാൽ/നമ്മാൽ nammaḷāl/nammāl	നിങ്ങളാൽ niṅṅaḷāl	അവരാൽ avarāl
Locative ആധാരിക	ഞങ്ങളിൽ ñaṅṅaḷil	നമ്മളിൽ/നമ്മിൽ nammaḷil/nammil	നിങ്ങളിൽ niṅṅaḷil	അവരിൽ avaril
Sociative സംയോജിക	ഞങ്ങളോട് ñaṅṅaḷōṭŭ	നമ്മളോട്/നമ്മോട് nammaḷōṭŭ/nammōṭŭ	നിങ്ങളോട് niṅṅaḷōṭŭ	അവരോട് avarōṭŭ

The mnemonic 'നിപ്രസം ഉപ്രസം ആ' (niprasam uprasam ā) created by combining the first sounds of the case names is used.

=== Number ===
The suffix -കൾ (-kaḷ), which changes to -ങ്ങൾ (-ṅṅaḷ) when the nouns end in -അം (-aṁ), is the most common suffix for denoting plural nouns. It is used by all inanimate nouns, concrete or abstract, and most animate, non-gendered nouns. Two other suffixes, -മാർ (-māṟ) and അർ (-aṟ), are used exclusively by a few animate nouns. All suffixes follow the sandhi (സന്ധി) rules where applicable, and are not used when preceded by numeral adjectives. The following are a few examples.

Word	Singular	Plural
book	പുസ്തകം (pustakaṁ)	പുസ്തകങ്ങൾ (pustakaṅṅaḷ)
umbrella	കുട (kuṭa)	കുടകൾ (kuṭakaḷ)
fish	മീൻ (mīṉ)	മീനുകൾ (mīṉukaḷ)
female	പെണ്ണ് (peṇṇŭ)	പെണ്ണുങ്ങൾ (peṇṇuṅṅaḷ)
youngster	യുവാവ് (yuvāvŭ)	യുവാക്കൾ (yuvākkaḷ)
cattle calf	കിടാവ് (kiṭāvŭ)	കിടാങ്ങൾ/കിടാക്കൾ (kiṭāṅṅaḷ/kiṭākkaḷ)
dog	നായ (nāya)	നായ്ക്കൾ/നായകൾ (nāykkaḷ/nāyakaḷ)
mother	അമ്മ (amma)	അമ്മമാർ (ammamāṟ)
king	രാജാവ് (rājāvŭ)	രാജാക്കന്മാർ (rājākkaṉmāṟ)
human	മനുഷ്യൻ (manuṣyaṉ)	മനുഷ്യർ (manuṣyaṟ)
person from Kochi	കൊച്ചിക്കാരൻ/-രി (koccikkār(aṉ/i))	കൊച്ചിക്കാർ (koccikkāṟ)

- A person from a place is denoted with -kāraṉ/kāri whose plural is -kāṟ. other ways include malayāḷikaḷ, tamiḻaṉmāṟ, kannaḍigaṟ.

=== Other nouns ===
The following are examples of some of the most common declensional patterns.

Word	tree		elephant		human		dog	
Case	Singular	Plural	Singular	Plural	Singular	Plural	Singular	Plural
Nominative	മരം (maram)	മരങ്ങൾ (maraṅṅaḷ)	ആന (āṉa)	ആനകൾ (āṉakaḷ)	മനുഷ്യൻ (maṉuṣyaṉ)	മനുഷ്യർ (maṉuṣyar)	പട്ടി (paṭṭi)	പട്ടികൾ (paṭṭikaḷ)
Vocative	മരമേ (maramē)	മരങ്ങളേ (maraṅṅaḷē)	ആനയേ (āṉayē)	ആനകളേ (āṉakaḷē)	മനുഷ്യാ (maṉuṣyā)	മനുഷ്യരേ (maṉuṣyarē)	പട്ടീ (paṭṭī)	പട്ടികളേ (paṭṭikaḷē)
Accusative	മരത്തിനെ (marattiṉe)	മരങ്ങളെ (maraṅṅaḷe)	ആനയെ (āṉaye)	ആനകളെ (āṉakaḷe)	മനുഷ്യനെ (maṉuṣyaṉe)	മനുഷ്യരെ (maṉuṣyare)	പട്ടിയെ (paṭṭiye)	പട്ടികളെ (paṭṭikaḷe)
Genitive	മരത്തിന്റെ (marattiṉṯe)	മരങ്ങളുടെ (maraṅṅaḷuṭe)	ആനയുടെ (āṉayuṭe)	ആനകളുടെ (āṉakaḷuṭe)	മനുഷ്യന്റെ (maṉuṣyaṉṯe)	മനുഷ്യരുടെ (maṉuṣyaruṭe)	പട്ടിയുടെ (paṭṭiyuṭe)	പട്ടികളുടെ (paṭṭikaḷuṭe)
Dative	മരത്തിന് (marattiṉŭ)	മരങ്ങൾക്ക് (maraṅṅaḷkkŭ)	ആനയ്ക്ക് (āṉaykkŭ)	ആനകൾക്ക് (āṉakaḷkkŭ)	മനുഷ്യന് (maṉuṣyaṉŭ)	മനുഷ്യർക്ക് (maṉuṣyarkkŭ)	പട്ടിക്ക് (paṭṭikkŭ)	പട്ടികൾക്ക് (paṭṭikaḷkkŭ)
Instrumental	മരത്താൽ (marattāl)	മരങ്ങളാൽ (maraṅṅaḷāl)	ആനയാൽ (āṉayāl)	ആനകളാൽ (āṉakaḷāl)	മനുഷ്യനാൽ (maṉuṣyaṉāl)	മനുഷ്യരാൽ (maṉuṣyarāl)	പട്ടിയാൽ (paṭṭiyāl)	പട്ടികളാൽ (paṭṭikaḷāl)
Locative	മരത്തിൽ (marattil)	മരങ്ങളിൽ (maraṅṅaḷil)	ആനയിൽ (āṉayil)	ആനകളിൽ (āṉakaḷil)	മനുഷ്യനിൽ (maṉuṣyaṉil)	മനുഷ്യരിൽ (maṉuṣyaril)	പട്ടിയിൽ (paṭṭiyil)	പട്ടികളിൽ (paṭṭikaḷil)
Sociative	മരത്തോട് (marattōṭŭ)	മരങ്ങളോട് (maraṅṅaḷōṭŭ)	ആനയോട് (āṉayōṭŭ)	ആനകളോട് (āṉakaḷōṭŭ)	മനുഷ്യനോട് (maṉuṣyaṉōṭŭ)	മനുഷ്യരോട് (maṉuṣyarōṭŭ)	പത്തിയോട് (paṭṭiyōṭŭ)	പട്ടികളോട് (paṭṭikaḷōṭŭ)

== Adjectives ==
Malayalam is thought to have no semantic category for adjectives, and instead relies heavily on using participial relative clauses for modifying nouns. There are two classes of words that typically act as adjectives.

1. Native roots + -(iy)a: This includes words such as നൽ > നല്ല (nalla, good), വൽ > വലിയ (valiya, big), നനഞ്ഞു > നനഞ്ഞ (naṉañña, wet), and ചെറു/ചിറു > ചെറിയ/ചിറ്റ (ceṟiya/ciṟṟa, short). All such words can be directly used as adjectives, without further modification. The conventional view regarding this category of words is that they typically encode the possession of the property they signify in the participial marker (-a) attached to them, meaning a word such as നല്ല (nalla) would actually mean "having goodness". For instance: ഇതൊരു നല്ല പുസ്തകമാണ് (itoru nalla pustakamāṇŭ), translating to "this is a good book", could be thought to mean "this is a goodness-having book". Note that when used in typical relative clauses, the marker -a can be inflected for tense, but not when used here in an adjectival sense.
2. Removing the noun formative -am: This includes words such as സങ്കടം (saṅkaṭaṁ, sadness), മരം (maraṁ, tree), and ഉയരം (uyaraṁ, height/tallness). As in marattaṭi "timber", mara vīṭŭ "wooden house". Another way is in the form of -ഉള്ള (uḷḷa), the suffix for the non-finite existential copula. For instance: അവൻ ഉയരമുള്ള കുട്ടിയാണ് (avaṉ uyaramuḷḷa kuṭṭiyāṇŭ, translating to "he is a tall child") could be thought to mean "he is a tallness-having child". Since the suffix is non-finite it does not vary with tense or person. The exception is with color words like (skt. nīla >) nīla "blue" which can act as both a noun and an adjective.
- Words ending with -ṟu, -tu, -ṭu can have the plosive doubled to make an adjective as in kāṭŭ > kāṭṭŭ, kāṭṭu tī "forest fire"; cōṟŭ > cōṟṟŭ, cōṟṟupātram "tiffin box".
- Words ending in -വ് (-vŭ) drop the suffix: നിലാവ് (nilāvŭ) → നിലാ നിഴൽ (nilā-niḻal), രാജാവ് (rājāvŭ) → രാജപുത്രൻ (rāja-putraṉ).
- Another adjectivizing suffix is -m added to some words ending with vowels, pai > paim "green, gorgeous," paiṅkiḷi > "green bird, parrot"; pū > pūm "flowery", pūmpāṟṟa "flower lizard, butterfly".
- Another adjectivizing suffix is -aṉ, eg. kaṭu > kaṭṭaṉ "strong, thick", kaṭṭaṉ cāya "strong tea, black tea".

== Verbs ==
Inflection of Malayalam verbs occurs for tense, aspect, and mode (TAM), and not for number (plurality) or gender. The dictionary form of verbs typically have the ending -ഉക (-uka), although some verbs have the ending ഇക (-ika) too.

=== Tenses ===
Broadly, there are three tenses in Malayalam language: present, past and future. Verb forms in different tenses are created by either simply replacing the citation form ending (for present and future tense), or by suffixing the verb stem (obtained by removing the citation form ending and the preceding consonant) with a special marker depending on the class of the verb (for past tense).

==== Present tense ====
The present tense is formed by replacing the citation form ending with -ഉന്നു (-unnu). For example, the present tense form of പറയുക (paṟayuka, 'to say') is പറയുന്നു (paṟayunnu).

==== Future tense ====
The future tense is formed by replacing the citation form ending with -ഉം (-um). For example, the future tense form of നടക്കുക (naṭakkuka, 'to walk') is നടക്കും (naṭakkum). -um is also used as an adjective, eg. paṟakkum taḷika.

==== Past tense ====
In Malayalam, all past-tense verbs end in either -ു (-u) or -ി (-i). The exact past-tense form depends on the final letters or sounds of the verb stem (excluding the citation suffix -ക / -ka). Below is a list of rules for the different verb classes, along with some exceptions:

Common Past Tense Formations
Citation Ending	Change Rule	Example
-ഇക്കുക (-ikkuka) (equal to or more than 4 syllables)	Replace ending with -ഇച്ചു (-iccu)	അടിക്കുക → അടിച്ചു (aṭikkuka → aṭiccu)
-ഇക്കുക (-ikkuka) (3 syllables)	Replace ending with -ഇക്കി (-ikki) (only വിക്കുക, തിക്കുക, ചിക്കുക)	വിക്കുക → വിക്കി (vikkuka → vikki) തിക്കുക → തിക്കി (tikkuka → tikki) ചിക്കുക → ചിക്കി (cikkuka → cikki)
-പ്പിക്കുക (-ppikkuka) (mostly causative)	Replace ending with -പ്പിച്ചു (-ppiccu)	പഠിപ്പിക്കുക → പഠിപ്പിച്ചു (paṭhippikkuka → paṭhippiccu)
-യ്ക്കുക (-ykkuka)	Replace ending with -ച്ചു (-ccu)	നനയ്ക്കുക → നനച്ചു (naṉaykkuka → naṉaccu)
-ർക്കുക (-ṟkkuka)	Replace ending with -ർത്തു (-ṟttu) (except the verbs listed below)	ഓർക്കുക → ഓർത്തു (ōṟkkuka → ōṟttu)
-ൽക്കുക (-lkkuka)	Replace ending with -റ്റു (-ṯṯu)	തോൽക്കുക → തോറ്റു (tōlkkuka → tōṯṯu)
-യുക (-yuka)	Replace ending with -ഞ്ഞു (-ññu)	പറയുക → പറഞ്ഞു (paṟayuka → paṟaññu)
-യ്യുക (-yyuka)	Replace ending with -യ്തു (-ytu)	ചെയ്യുക → ചെയ്തു (ceyyuka → ceytu)
-ടുക (-ṭuka) (after short vowel)	Replace ending with -ട്ടു (-ṭṭu)	ഇടുക → ഇട്ടു (iṭuka → iṭṭu)
-ടുക (-ṭuka) (after long vowel)	Replace ending with -ടി (-ṭi)	പാടുക → പാടി (pāṭuka → pāṭi)
-ട്ടുക (-ṭṭuka)	Replace ending with -ട്ടി (-ṭṭi)	കൂട്ടുക → കൂട്ടി (kūṭṭuka → kūṭṭi)
-ണ്ടുക (-ṇṭuka)	Replace ending with -ണ്ടി (-ṇṭi)	തോണ്ടുക → തോണ്ടി (tōṇṭuka → tōṇṭi)
-റുക (-ṟuka)	Replace ending with -റി (-ṟi)	നീറുക → നീറി (nīṟuka → nīṟi)
-റ്റുക (-ṟṟuka)	Replace ending with -റ്റി (-ṟṟi)	പറ്റുക → പറ്റി (paṟṟuka → paṟṟi)
-ത്തുക (-ttuka)	Replace ending with -ത്തി (-tti)	നടത്തുക → നടത്തി (naṭattuka → naṭatti)
-തുക (-tuka)	Replace ending with -തി (-ti)	കോതുക → കോതി (kōtuka → kōti)
-കുക (-kuka)	Replace ending with -കി (-ki)	ഉരുകുക → ഉരുകി (urukuka → uruki)
-ങ്ങുക (-ṅṅuka)	Replace ending with -ങ്ങി (-ṅṅi)	മുങ്ങുക → മുങ്ങി (muṅṅuka → muṅṅi)
-ണ്ണുക (-ṇṇuka)	Replace ending with -ണ്ണി (-ṇṇi)	എണ്ണുക → എണ്ണി (eṇṇuka → eṇṇi)
-പ്പുക (-ppuka)	Replace ending with -പ്പി (-ppi)	തുപ്പുക → തുപ്പി (tuppuka → tuppi)
-മ്മുക (-mmuka)	Replace ending with -മ്മി (-mmi)	തുമ്മുക → തുമ്മി (tummuka → tummi)
-മ്പുക (-mpuka)	Replace ending with -മ്പി (-mpi)	വിളമ്പുക → വിളമ്പി (viḷampuka → viḷampi)
-ഞ്ചുക (-ñcuka)	Replace ending with -ഞ്ചി (-ñci)	കെഞ്ചുക → കെഞ്ചി (keñcuka → keñci)
-ച്ചുക (-ccuka)	Replace ending with -ച്ചി (-cci)	പിച്ചുക → പിച്ചി (piccuka → picci)
-ന്നുക (-nnuka)	Replace ending with -ന്നി (-nni)	തോന്നുക → തോന്നി (tōnnuka → tōnni)
-രുക (-ruka) (after short vowel)	Replace ending with -ർന്നു (-ṟnnu)	പടരുക → പടർന്നു (paṭaruka → paṭarnnu)
-ളുക (-ḷuka) (after short vowel)	Replace ending with -ണ്ടു (-ṇṭu)	ഉരുളുക → ഉരുണ്ടു (uruḷuka → uruṇṭu)
-ഉക്കുക (-ukkuka) (equal to or more than 4 syllables)	Replace ending with -ഉക്കി (-ukki) or -ഉത്തു (-uttu) (depends on the verb)	ഉരുക്കുക → ഉരുക്കി (urukkuka → urukki) തണുക്കുക → തണുത്തു (taṇukkuka → taṇuttu)

===== Exceptions and Irregulars =====
- ഇരിക്കുക (irikkuka, to sit) → ഇരുന്നു (irunnu). (Exception to the -ikkuka rule).
- പണിയുക (paṇiyuka, to build) → പണിതു (paṇitu). (Exception to the -yuka rule.)
- നിൽക്കുക (nilkkuka, to stand) → നിന്നു (ninnu). (Exception to the -lkkuka rule).
- തിന്നുക (tiṉṉuka, to eat) → തിന്നു (tinnu). (Exception to the -nnuka rule).
- പെറുക (peṟuka, to give birth) → പെറ്റു (peṟṟu). (Exception to the -ṟuka rule).
- അറുക (aṟuka, to be severed) → അറ്റു (aṟṟu). (Exception to the -ṟuka rule).
- വേവുക (vēkuka, to cook) → വെന്തു (ventu).
- നോവുക (nōvuka, to pain) → നൊന്തു (nontu).
- ചാകുക (cākuka, to die) → ചത്തു (cattu).
- ആകുക (ākuka, to become) → ആയി (āyi).
- കാണുക (kāṇuka, to see) → കണ്ടു (kaṇṭu).
- പിളർക്കുക (piḷaṟkkuka, to split) → പിളർത്തി (piḷaṟtti). (Exception to the -ṟkkuka rule; takes -i instead of -u.) Alternative citation form പിളർത്തുക (piḷaṟttuka) follows the regular -ttuka rule: പിളർത്തുക → പിളർത്തി.
- മലർക്കുക (malaṟkkuka, to lie face up) → മലർത്തി (malaṟtti). (Exception to the -ṟkkuka rule.) Alternative form മലർത്തുക (malaṟttuka) → മലർത്തി, regular.
- പകർക്കുക (pakaṟkkuka, to copy / to transfer) → പകർത്തി (pakaṟtti). (Exception to the -ṟkkuka rule.) Alternative form പകർത്തുക (pakaṟttuka) → പകർത്തി, regular.
- കൈക്കുക (kaikkuka) → കൈച്ചു ( kaiccu) (rare verb that ends with -ഐക്കുക (-aikkuka) )

=== Aspect ===
Verb conjugations for the verb "പോകുക" (pōkuka, to go) based on the commonly recognized aspects in Malayalam are given below. The past tense marker in this case is -ഇ (-i).

Tenses
	Past	Present	Future
Simple	പോയി pōyi	പോകുന്നു pōkunnu	പോകും pōkum
Continuous	പോകുകയായിരുന്നു pōvukayāyirunnu	പോകുകയാണ് pōvukayāṇŭ	പോയികൊണ്ടിരിക്കും pōyikkoṇṭirikkum
Perfect	പോയിട്ടുണ്ടായിരുന്നു/പോയിരുന്നു pōyiṭṭuṇṭāyirunnu	പോയിട്ടുണ്ട് pōyiṭṭuṇṭŭ	പോയിട്ടുണ്ടാകും pōyiṭṭuṇṭākum
Perfect continuous	പോയിക്കൊണ്ടിരിക്കുകയായിരുന്നു pōyikkoṇṭirikkukayāyirunnu	പോയിക്കൊണ്ടിരിക്കുകയാണ് pōyikkoṇṭirikkukayāṇŭ	പോയിക്കൊണ്ടിരിക്കുകയായിരിക്കും pōyikkoṇṭirikkukayāyirikkum
Habitual	പോകാറുണ്ടായിരുന്നു pōkāṟuṇṭāyirunnu	പോകാറുണ്ട് pōkāṟuṇṭŭ	–

=== Mood ===
==== Imperative ====
Bare root can act as an imperative, eg. cey! "do!", another way is by aorist suffix formal -ū (< -um), informal -ŭ eg. ceyyū/ceyyŭ and -aṇam/ēṇam, ceyyaṇam/ceyyēṇam "must do!" which is a short form of vēṇam. Originally in old Malayalam -Ø/-kku was for singular and -viṉ (weak verbs), -ppiṉ (strong verbs), -miṉ (after nasals) for plurals, eg 2sg cey, pl cey-viṉ "do!", sg naṭa/naṭakku "walk!", pl naṭa-pp-iṉ "walk!", kāṇmiṉ "see!". Plural set is rarely used in modern formal Malayalam and is interchangeable with the singular set. Certain northern dialects preserve -vin as -i, eg. vannōḷi < vannu koḷḷuviṉ. A polite imperative is made with -ka/-kka in finite forms, eg. ceyyuka "do!". Old Malayalam prohibitive was by adding -āy before -ka for singular and -viṉ for plural, eg. ceyy-āy-ka "(one) should not do", nill-āy-vin "do not stand!".

==== Conditional ====
In old Malayalam -il/-kil were used as conditionals and is rarely used in modern formal Malayalam, eg. OMa. var-il/varu-kil "if one comes". Modern Malayalam uses past form and -āl (dialectal -ēl), Mdn Ma. vann-āl (dialectal vann-ēl) "if one comes". -āl can come only after verbs, eg uṇṭeṅkil = uṇṭēl but there can't be uṇṭāl. Concessive is made by adding -um to the conditional form, vann-āl-um. Another form is adding -eṅkil (from -en "to say" and -kil) to the past form, vann-eṅkil.

==== Infinitive ====
In Old Malayalam the infinitive was made by adding -ān to the non-past stem in -m/-pp/-uv-/-v, eg. kāṇ-m-āṉ "to see", koṭu-pp-āṉ "to give", cey-v-āṉ "to do". Modern Malaylam -āṉ acts as an infinitive suffix preceded by -kk in the case of strong verbs, eg. kāṇ-āṉ, koṭu-kk-āṉ, ceyy-āṉ.

==== Potential ====
-ām is used for potential mood, ceyyām "will do", ceytēkkām "may do".

=== Copula ===
Malayalam employs two defective verbs as its copulas. The first, -ആക് (ākŭ), is the plain equative copula. The second, -ഉണ്ട് (uṇṭŭ), is the locative copula and also used to indicate possession (with the subject/possessor in the dative case). These verbs change forms in different tenses and are usually suffixed to the noun phrases that are specified by the copula. The table below lists some examples.

Example	Notes
Equative
അവൻ സന്തുഷ്ടനാണ് avaṉ santuṣṭaṉāṇŭ He is happy	Present tense form of ആക് is ആണ് (āṇŭ)
അവൻ സന്തുഷ്ടനായിരുന്നു avaṉ santuṣṭaṉāyirunnu He was happy	Past tense form of ആക് is ആയിരുന്നു (āyirunnu)
അവൻ സന്തുഷ്ടനാകും avaṉ santuṣṭaṉākuṁ He will be happy	Future tense form of ആക് is ആകും (ākuṁ)
Locative
അവൻ വീട്ടിലുണ്ട് avaṉ vīṭṭiluṇṭŭ He is in the house	ഉണ്ട് stays the same in the present tense
അവൻ വീട്ടിൽ ഉണ്ടായിരുന്നു avaṉ vīṭṭil uṇṭāyirunnu He was in the house	Past tense form of ഉണ്ട് is ഉണ്ടായിരുന്നു (uṇṭāyirunnu)
അവൻ വീട്ടിൽ ഉണ്ടാകും avaṉ vīṭṭil uṇṭākuṁ He will be in the house	Future tense form of ഉണ്ട് is ഉണ്ടാകും (uṇṭākuṁ)
Possessive
അവൾക്ക് ഒരു പുസ്തകമുണ്ട് avaḷkkŭ oru pustakamuṇṭŭ She has a book	
അവൾക്ക് ഒരു പുസ്തകം ഉണ്ടായിരുന്നു avaḷkkŭ oru pustakaṁ uṇṭāyirunnu She had a book	
അവൾക്ക് ഒരു പുസ്തകം ഉണ്ടാകും avaḷkkŭ oru pustakaṁ uṇṭākuṁ She will have a book	

=== Causatives ===
Malayalam has 3 levels of causatives, usually verb happening, 1st person causing it to happen and making someone do it. Usually the last consonant is doubled to make the 2nd level but some verbs can use -kku- for it; 3rd level suffixes -ppikku-. Example ōṭuka "to run", ōṭikkuka/ōṭṭuka "to make someone run/ to drive", ōṭippikkuka/ōṭṭikkuka "to make someone make someone run/to make someone drive". Another suffix for 2nd level is -ttu, eg. cāruka/cāṟttuka/cāṟttikkuka, akaluka/akaṟṟuka/akaṟṟikkuka, kāṇuka/kāṭṭuka/kāṭṭikkuka, last 2 with sandhi for -ttu. 2nd level can be made 1st by adding peṭuka after it, eg. kāṇappeṭuka "get seen". Not all verbs have causatives like pōkuka.

=== Negation ===
Standard negation is expressed through the use of the negative particle/suffix -ഇല്ല (-illa, literally "no"), regardless of tense. The equative copula -ആക്, however, is negated by the negative suffix -അല്ല (-alla) in the present tense; in all other tenses -ഇല്ല is used. When these particles are suffixed to their corresponding noun phrases, sandhi (സന്ധി) rules must be obeyed.

Example	Notes
അവൻ സന്തുഷ്ടനല്ല avaṉ santuṣṭaṉalla He is not happy	Equative copula negated by -അല്ല (-alla) in the present tense
അവൻ സന്തുഷ്ടനായിരുന്നില്ല avaṉ santuṣṭaṉāyirunnilla He was not happy	Equative copula negated by -ഇല്ല (-illa) in any tense other than the present tense
അവൾക്ക് ഒരു പുസ്തകമില്ല avaḷkkŭ oru pustakamilla She does not have a book	All other negations use -ഇല്ല (-illa)
അവൾ പോകുന്നില്ല avaḷ pōkunnilla She is not going	All other negations use -ഇല്ല (-illa)
അവർ ഇവിടെയില്ല avaṟ iviṭeyilla They are not here	All other negations use -ഇല്ല (-illa)

- Old Malayalam -ā(y) is rare today, used mostly in the standard language, eg. paṟakkā kiḷi "flightless bird", paṟakkāyka "flightlessness", commonly paṟakkātta kiḷi / paṟakkillātta kiḷi, varāñña (<var-āy-nt-a) "(subject) which did not come", commonly vannillātta.

Prohibitive

Dismissive/Insistent/Low "don't"	ചെയ്യല്ലേ (ceyyallē)
Non-polite "don't"	ചെയ്യാൻ പാടില്ല (ceyyān pāṭilla)
Polite "please don't"	ചെയ്യാതെ (ceyyāte)
Recommending "shouldn't"	ചെയ്യരുത് (ceyyarutu)
Forbidding "mustn't"	ചെയ്യണ്ട (ceyyaṇṭa)

== Others ==
=== Comparatives ===
- -kāḷ and -kāṭṭi are used interchangeably as comparatives after adding the accusative case, eg. pattiṉekkāṭṭi/pattiṉekkāḷ valutŭ nūṟāṇŭ. -um can be added for intensification pattiṉekkāṭṭum valutŭ nūṟāṇŭ.

== Sandhi (സന്ധി) ==
Malayalam is an agglutinative language, and words can be joined in many ways. These ways are called sandhi (literally 'junction'). There are basically two genres of Sandhi used in Malayalam – one group unique to Malayalam (based originally on Old Tamil phonological rules, and in essence common with Tamil), and the other one common with Sanskrit. Thus, we have the "Malayāḷa Sandhi" and "Saṁskr̥ta Sandhi".

=== Sandhi unique to Malayalam, based on Old Tamil ===
There are basically four Sandhi types unique to Malayalam – the "lōpa sandhi", "dvitva sandhi", "āgama sandhi" and "ādēśa sandhi".

==== Lōpa sandhi or "Elision"(ലോപ സന്ധി) ====
The Lopa sandhi occurs when the varna (vowel) at the end of a word is lost when it merges with another word. In most cases, the varna is the "samvr̥tōkāram". (the "closed u sound").

കണ്ട് + ഇല്ല = കണ്ടില്ല
kaṇṭŭ + illa = kaṇṭilla

നായ + കുട്ടി = നായ്ക്കുട്ടി
nāya + kuṭṭi = nāykuṭṭi

==== Dvitva Sandhi or "Rule of doubling" ====
In Malayalam, gemination is more in tense consonants and less in lax consonants. When two words combine in which the first is the qualifier and the qualified, the tense consonant initial to the second word geminates.

മര + കൊമ്പ് = മരക്കൊമ്പ്
mara + kombŭ = marakkombŭ

കൈ + കൂലി = കൈക്കൂലി
kai + kūli = kaikkūli

==== Āgama sandhi or "Rule of arrival" (ആഗമ സന്ധി) ====
When two vowels undergo Sandhi, a consonant ("y" or "v") is added to avoid the pronunciation difficulty.

വഴി + അമ്പലം = വഴിയമ്പലം
vaḻi + ampalam = vaḻiyampalam.

പൊതു + ആയി = പൊതുവായി
potu + āyi = potuvāyi

==== Ādēśa Sandhi or "Rule of substitution" ====
In this Sandhi, one letter is substituted by another during concatenation.

വിൺ + തലം = വിണ്ടലം
viṇ + talam = viṇṭalam

വലം + കൈ = വലങ്കൈ
valam + kai = valaṅkai

നൽ + -മ = നന്മ
nal + ma = naṉma

This sandhi also includes Sanskrit Sandhi forms like vi + samam = viṣamam, but the latter rule isn't absolute, its patisandhya, nissāram, vismayam not patiṣandhya, niṣṣāram, viṣmayam.

=== Sandhi common with Sanskrit ===
These Sandhi rules are basically inherited from Sanskrit, and are used in conjunction with Sanskrit vocabulary which forms approximately 60% of Modern Standard Malayalam (the entire Sanskrit vocabulary is also usable with appropriate changes). The rules like savarṇadīrgha sandhi, yaṇ sandhi, guṇa sandhi, vr̥ddhi sandhi and visarga sandhis are used without changes.

==== Samāsam (സമാസം) ====
All the Sanskrit samāsa rules are adapted to Malayalam compounds. In Malayalam, the tatpuruṣa compounds are classified according to the vibhakti they are based on, during compounding. The "alaṅkāraṁ" is also used to classify tatpuruṣa compounds. There are 4 types of samasam: 1) āvyayi bhavaṉ, 2) tatpuruṣa, 3) dvandaṉ, and 4) bahuvr̥hi.

==== Vr̥ttaṁ (വൃത്തം) ====
The vr̥ttaṁ consists of metres of Malayalam prosody. Like Sandhi, there are specific vr̥ttaṁs unique to Malayalam apart from the metres common with Sanskrit. As in case of Sandhi, the Malayalam vrittams are also named in Sanskrit.

==== Alaṅkāram (അലങ്കാരം) ====
Alaṅkāraṁ or "ornamentation" is also based on Sanskritic grammarian classification. It consists of the different figures of speech used in Malayalam poetry. Being successor to Sanskrit and Maṇipravāḷam, most of Sanskrit alankaras are used in Malayalam. Thus, the common figures of speech in poems are rūpakaṁ, utprēkṣā, upamā etc.

== Words adopted from Sanskrit ==
When words are adopted from Sanskrit, their endings are usually changed to conform to Malayalam norms:

=== Nouns ===
1. Masculine Sanskrit nouns with a word stem ending in a short "a" take the ending "an" in the nominative singular. For example, Kr̥ṣṇa -> Kr̥ṣṇaṉ. The final "n" is dropped before masculine surnames, honorifics, or titles ending in "an" and beginning with a consonant other than "n" – e.g. Krishna Menon, Kr̥ṣṇa Kaṇiyāṉ etc., but Kr̥ṣṇan Eḻuttaccaṉ. Surnames ending with "aṟ" or "aḷ" (where these are plural forms of "aṉ" denoting respect) are treated similarly – Kr̥ṣṇa Potuvāḷ, Kr̥ṣṇa Cākyāṟ, but Kr̥ṣṇaṉ Nāyaṟ, Kr̥ṣṇaṉ Nambyāṟ, as are Sanskrit surnames such "Vaṟma(ṉ)", "Śaṟma(ṉ)", or "Gupta(ṉ)" (rare) – e.g. Kr̥ṣṇa Vaṟma, Kr̥ṣṇa Śaṟmaṉ. If a name is a compound, only the last element undergoes this transformation – e.g. Kr̥ṣṇa + dēva = Kr̥ṣṇadēvaṉ, not Kr̥ṣṇandēvaṉ. This is also done to personify something like śukraṉ, śvāṉaṉ etc.
2. Feminine words ending in a long "ā" or "ī" are changed so that they now end in a short "a" or "i", for example Sītā -> Sīta and Lakṣmī -> Lakṣmi. However, the long vowel still appears in compound words, such as Sītādēvi or Lakṣmīdēvi. The long ī is generally reserved for the vocative forms of these names, although in Sanskrit the vocative actually takes a short "i". There are also a small number of nominative "ī" endings that have not been shortened – a prominent example being the word "strī" "woman".
3. Nouns that have a stem in -an and which end with a long "ā" in the masculine nominative singular have a "vŭ" added to them, for example Brahmā (stem Brahman) -> Brahmāvŭ. When the same nouns are declined in the neuter and take a short "a" ending in Sanskrit, Malayalam adds an additional "m", e.g. Brahma (neuter nominative singular of Brahman) becomes Brahmam. This is again omitted when forming compounds.
4. Words whose roots end in -an but whose nominative singular ending is -a – for example, the Sanskrit root of "Karma" is actually "Karman" –are also changed. The original root is ignored and "Karma" (the form in Malayalam being "Karmam" because it ends in a short "a") is taken as the basic form of the noun when declining. However, this does not apply to all consonant stems, as "unchangeable" stems such as "manasa" ("mind") and "suhr̥ta (friend)" are identical to the Malayalam nominative singular forms (although the regularly derived "manam" sometimes occurs as an alternative to "manasa").
5. Sanskrit words describing things or animals rather than people with a stem in short "a" end with an "m" Malayalam. For example, Rāmāyaṇa -> Rāmāyaṇam. In most cases, this is actually the as the Sanskrit ending, which is also "m" (or allophonically anusvara due to Sandhi) in the neuter nominative. However, "things and animals" and "people" are not always differentiated based on whether or not they are sentient beings – for example Narasimha becomes Narasiṃham and not Narasiṃhan, whereas Ananta becomes Anantan even though both are sentient.
6. Nouns with short vowel stems other than "a", such as "Viṣṇu", "Prajāpati" etc. are declined with the Sanskrit stem acting as the Malayalam nominative singular (the Sanskrit nominative singular is formed by adding a visarga, e.g. Viṣṇuḥ)
7. The original Sanskrit vocative is often used in formal or poetic Malayalam, e.g. "Harē" (for Hari) or "Prabhō" (for "Prabhu" – "lord"). This is restricted to certain contexts – mainly when addressing deities or other exalted individuals, so a normal man named Hari would usually be addressed using a Malayalam vocative such as "Harī". The Sanskrit genitive is also occasionally found in Malayalam poetry, especially the personal pronouns "mama" (my/ mine) and "tava" (thy/ thine). Other cases are less common and generally restricted to the realm of Maṇipravāḷam.
8. Along with these tatsama borrowings, there are also many tadbhava words in common use. These were borrowed into Malayalam before it became distinct from Tamil. As the language did not then accommodate Sanskrit phonology as it now does, words were changed to conform to the native phonological system. For example: Kr̥ṣṇa -> Kaṇṇan, suṣira > tuḻiraṁ.
