= R. Narayana Panickar =

Malayalam Writer

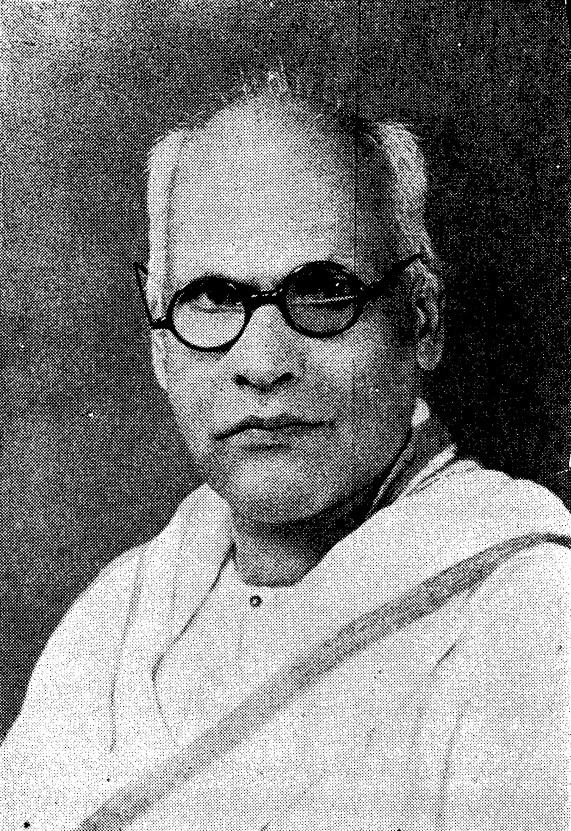
- Born: 25 January 1889; Ambalappuzha, Travancore
- Died: 29 October 1959 (aged 70)
- Occupations: Essayist; playwright; translator; lexicographer; novelist; historian
- Notable work: Kerala Bhasha Sahitya Charitram; Navayuga Bhasha Nighantu
- Spouse(s): Janaki Amma, Thankamma
- Parents: Ayyappan Pilla; Kunji Amma
- Awards: Sahitya Akademi Award

R. Narayana Panickar (25 January 1889 – 29 October 1959) was an Indian essayist, playwright, translator, lexicographer, novelist and historian of Malayalam. He was credited with over 100 books but the best known among them are the seven-volume work, Kerala Bhasha Sahitya Charitram, a comprehensive history of Malayalam literature up to 1951 and Navayuga Bhasha Nighantu, a lexicon. He also wrote a number of novels and translated several works including Purananuru, Akanaṉūṟu and Silappatikaram. He was also a historian and published works such as Thiruvithamkoor Charitram and Kerala Charitram. Sahitya Akademi honoured him with their annual award in 1955.

== Biography ==
Narayana Panickar was born on 25 January 1889 at Ambalappuzha, in Alappuzha district of the south Indian state of Kerala to Ayyappan Pilla and Valezhathu Kunji Amma. After schooling at Ambalappuzha and Alappuzha, he completed his intermediate course from Maharaja's College, Ernakulam and continued his undergraduate studies at Thiruvananthapuram which he could not complete it. subsequently, he returned to Alappuzha where he worked as a teacher, simultaneously studying privately to earn a bachelor's degree. Thereafter, he worked at various schools in Kerala including St. Mary's High School, Champakkara, St. Aloysiuos High School, Edathua, Kottappuram High School, Government Sanskrit School, Thiruvananthapuram, and S. M. V. High School, Vanchiyoor before superannuating from service from S. R. V. High School, Nagarcoil in 1944.

Panickar was known to have published over 100 books, composed of novels, poems, histories, biographies, translations and lexicons. However, he is best remembered for the seven-volume work, Kerala Bhasha Sahitya Charitram, a comprehensive history of Malayalam literature up to 1951 and Navayuga Bhasha Nighantu, a lexicon. Kerala Bhasha Sahitya Charitram fetched him the Sahitya Akademi Award for Malayalam in 1955. He also translated several classics of Tamil and Bengali literature including Purananuru, Akanaṉūṟu, Silappatikaram and Sita of Dwijendralal Ray.

Panickar married three times, first to Janaki Amma but after her death in 1913, he had a short marriage after which he married Thankamma, the daughter of K. C. Kesava Pillai, a noted Carnatic musician and the poet laureate of Travancore. He died on 29 October 1959, at the age of 70. His life has been documented in a biography, R. Narayana Panicker, by R. Balakrishnan Nair.

== List of works ==
R. Narayana Panickar authored about 100 books comprising history, novels, short stories and plays.

History: Kerala Bhasha Sahitya Charitram (7 volumes), Thiruvithamkoor Charitram, Kerala Charitram, Mukila Samrajyodayam, Mukila Prabhavam, Ayurveda Charitram, Muhammad Nabi, Ayyappa Charitam (2 volumes), Mahacharitamala, Asokavardhana, Arya Charitam, Dharmaraja, Ayyappan Marthanda Pillai, Raja Kesava Dasan, Sri Ramanujan Ezhuthachan, Kunchan Nambiar, Matruka Bhrityan, Bharatan, Chaitra Rajaratnam, Mahatma Gandhi, Netaji, Jawaharlal

Novels/short stories: Yugalanguliyakam, Amritavalli, Mrinalini, Saraswati, Maharashtra Jivanaprabhatam, Chandranathan, Annapurnalayam, Lalita, Atma Samarpanam, Anuradha, Manorama, Satisha Chandran, Valiya Chechi, Madhuri, Rahasya Petika, Vanaja Kumari, Kusuma, Ashalatha

Plays: Sita Nirvasam, Devika Rani, Premotkarsham, Rama, Meena, Maurya Vijayam, Mevar Pathanam

Songs: Gandhi Gitangal (3 volumes), Desiya Gana Manjari, Sri Ramakrishna Ganavali

Dictionaries: Angaleya-Malayala Brihatkosam, Navayuga Bhasha Nighantu, English-Malayalam Nighantu, Sanketika Nighantu

Interpretations: Kathakali – Nalacharitam (4 volumes), Uttaraswayamvaram, Rukminiswayamvaram, Nivatakavacha Kalakeyavadham; Thullal – Patra Charitam, Kiratam; Mahabharata – Bhishma Parvam; Ramayana – Irupathinalu Vritham; Sanskrit – Anurangam, Ratimanjari

Miscellaneous: Urdu Sikshakan, Hindi Balabodhini, Hindi Mahopadhyayan, Muthollayiram, Vijyana Veethi, Matruka Rajyam, Jyotisha Sarasarvasvam, Bhavaphalam

== Selected bibliography ==
=== Non-fiction ===
- R. Narayana Panikkar (1929–1951). Kerala Bhasha Sahitya Charitram (7 volumes). Trivandrum: Vidya Vilasini Book Depot.
- R. Narayana Panicker (1964). Navayuga Bhasha Nighantu (in Malayalam). Trivandrum: Reddiar Press & Book Depot. OCLC 14055820.
- R. Narayana Panicker (1922). Mukhya Pareekshapadasahyavum Haindava Natyasastravum. Trivandrum: Anantha Rama Varma Press.
- R. Narayana Panikkar. Thiruvithamkoor Charitram. Trivandrum.

=== Novels ===
- R. Narayana Panickar. Premolkarsham. B. V. Book Depot.
- R. Narayana Panickar. Lalita. Trivandrum: Subbiah Reddiar.

=== Translations ===
- Dvijendralal Roy (2005). Sita Nirvasam (PDF). Translated by R. Narayana Panikkar. Sahitya Akademi. ISBN 9788172017989. "Translation of Roy's Sita from Bengali"
- R. Narayana Panickar (1966). Chilappathikaram. Calicut: Mathrubhumi.
- R. Narayana Panickar (1958). Pathittupathu. Quilon: S.T. Reddiar and Sons.

=== Writings on Panickar ===
- R. Balakrishnan Nair (1996). R. Narayana Panicker (in Malayalam).

== See also ==
- List of Malayalam-language authors by category
- List of Malayalam-language authors
