= Thanumalayan Temple =

Shiva temple in Kanyakumari district, Tamil Nadu, India

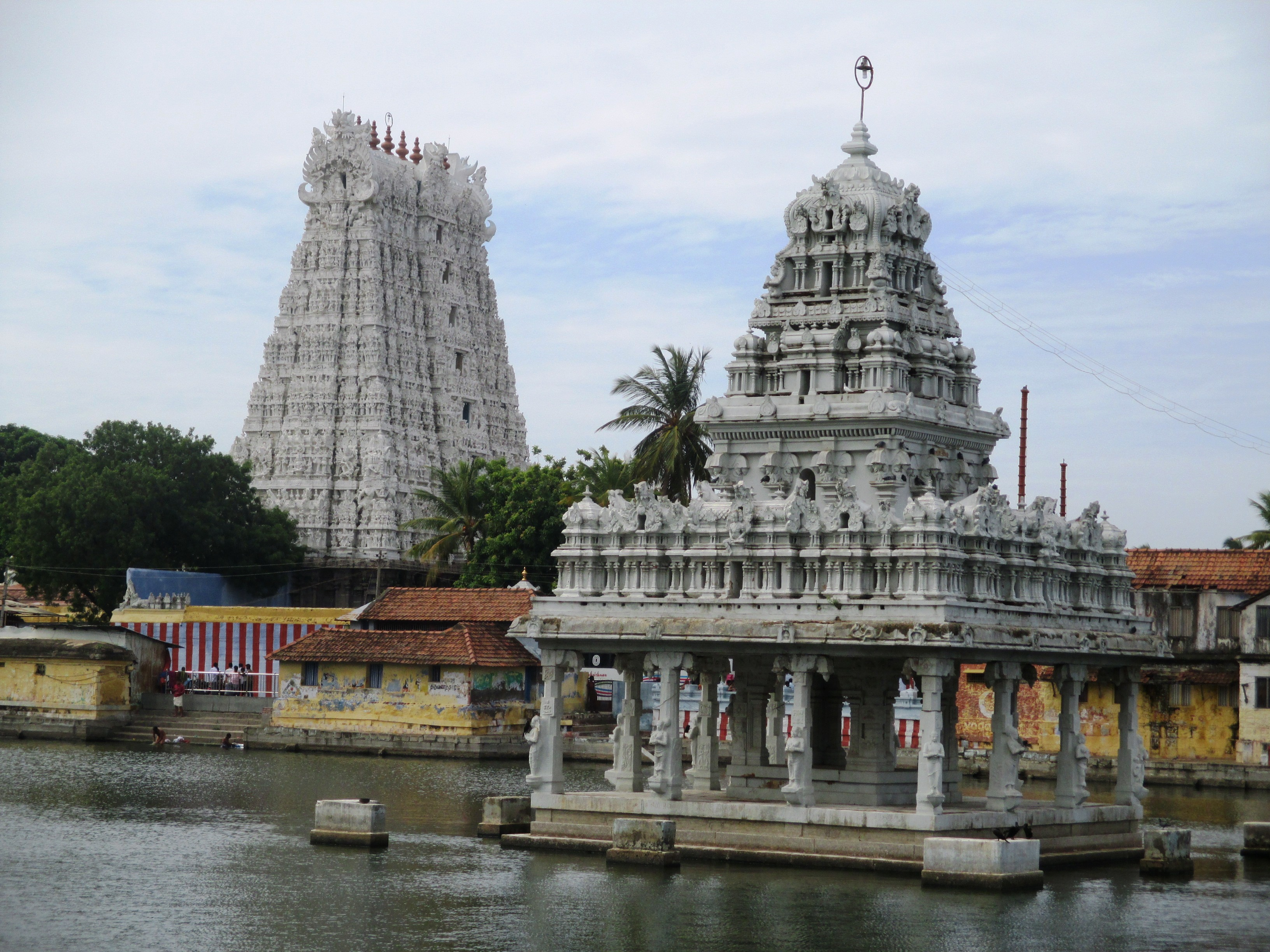

- Location in Tamil Nadu

Religion
- Affiliation: Hinduism
- District: Kanyakumari
- Deity: Thanumalayan

Location
- Location: Suchindram
- State: Tamil Nadu
- Country: India
- Coordinates: 8°9′17″N 77°27′55″E

Architecture
- Type: Dravidian architecture
- Creator: Cheras, Pandyas Vijayanagar Nayak Kings, Travancore royal family, Cholas

The Thanumalayan Temple, also called Sthanumalayan Temple, is an important Hindu temple located in Suchindram in the Kanyakumari district of Tamil Nadu, India. The Thanumalayan Temple is of importance to both Shaivaite and Vaishnavite sects of Hinduism, as the name Stanumalaya denotes the Trimurti; "Stanu" means Shiva; "Mal" means Vishnu; and the "Ayan" means Brahma. It counts among the Abhimana Kshetrams in Vaishnavite traditions. It is one of the 108 Shiva Temples revered by the Kerala Hindu culture, though this temple is now in Tamil Nadu, after Kanyakumari District was merged into Tamil Nadu from Travancore.

The temple complex covers around two acres and has two gateway towers called gopurams. The tallest is the eastern tower with 11 stories and a height of 44 metres (144 ft). The temple has numerous shrines, with those of Sthanumalayan and that of Hanuman being the most prominent. The temple has six daily rituals at various times from 5:30 a.m. to 9 p.m., and many yearly festivals on its calendar, with the festival during Margazhi being the most prominent. The present masonry structure was built during the Chola dynasty in the 9th century, while later expansions are attributed to Thirumalai Nayak and the Travancore Maharajas. The temple is maintained and administered by the Dharmapuram Aadhenam. The temple is associated with Indra whose sin was propitiated after worshiping the presiding deity and also Anasuya known for her chastity. The temple is maintained and administered by the Hindu Religious and Charitable Endowments Department of the Government of Tamil Nadu.

== Legend ==
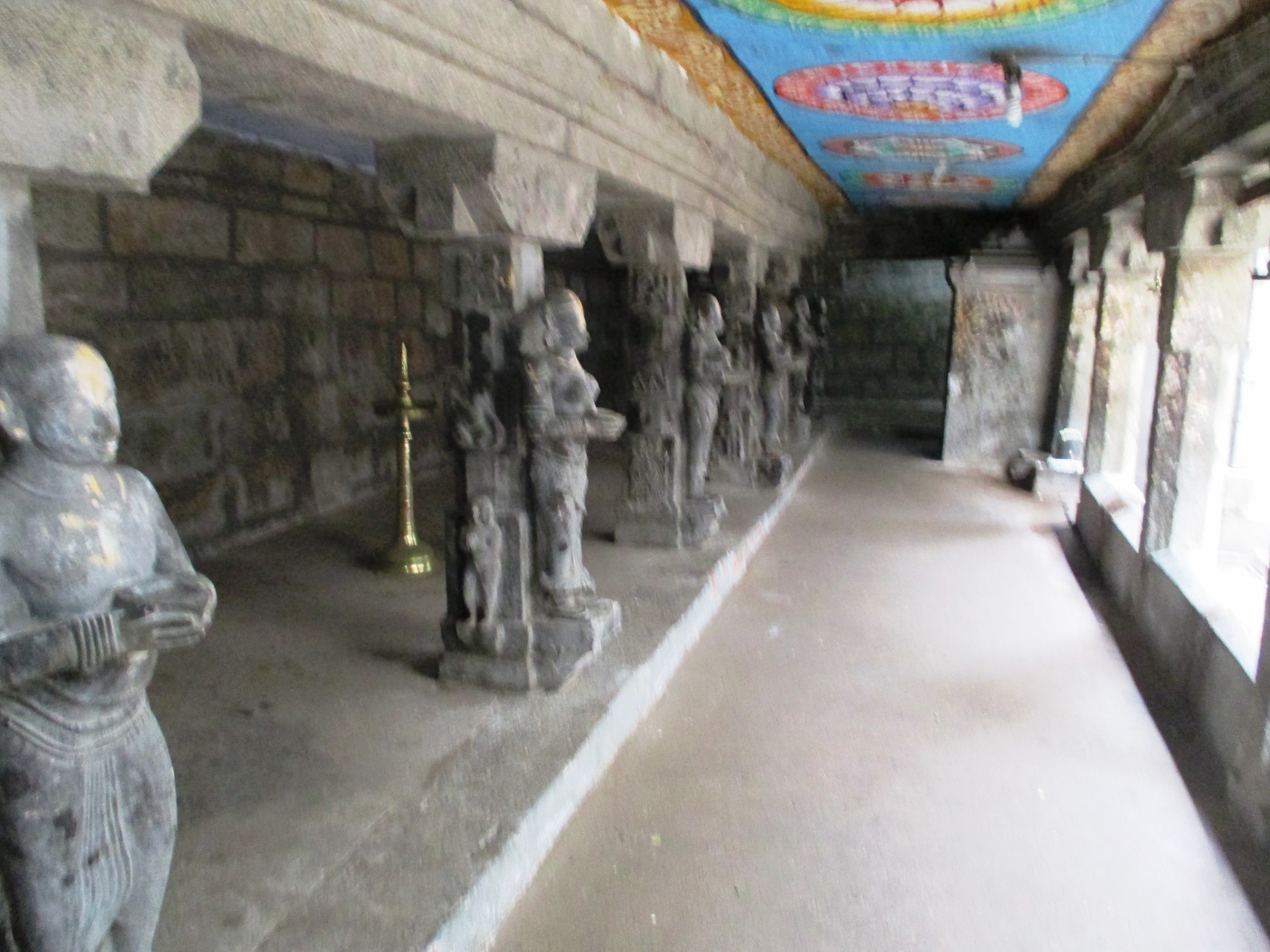
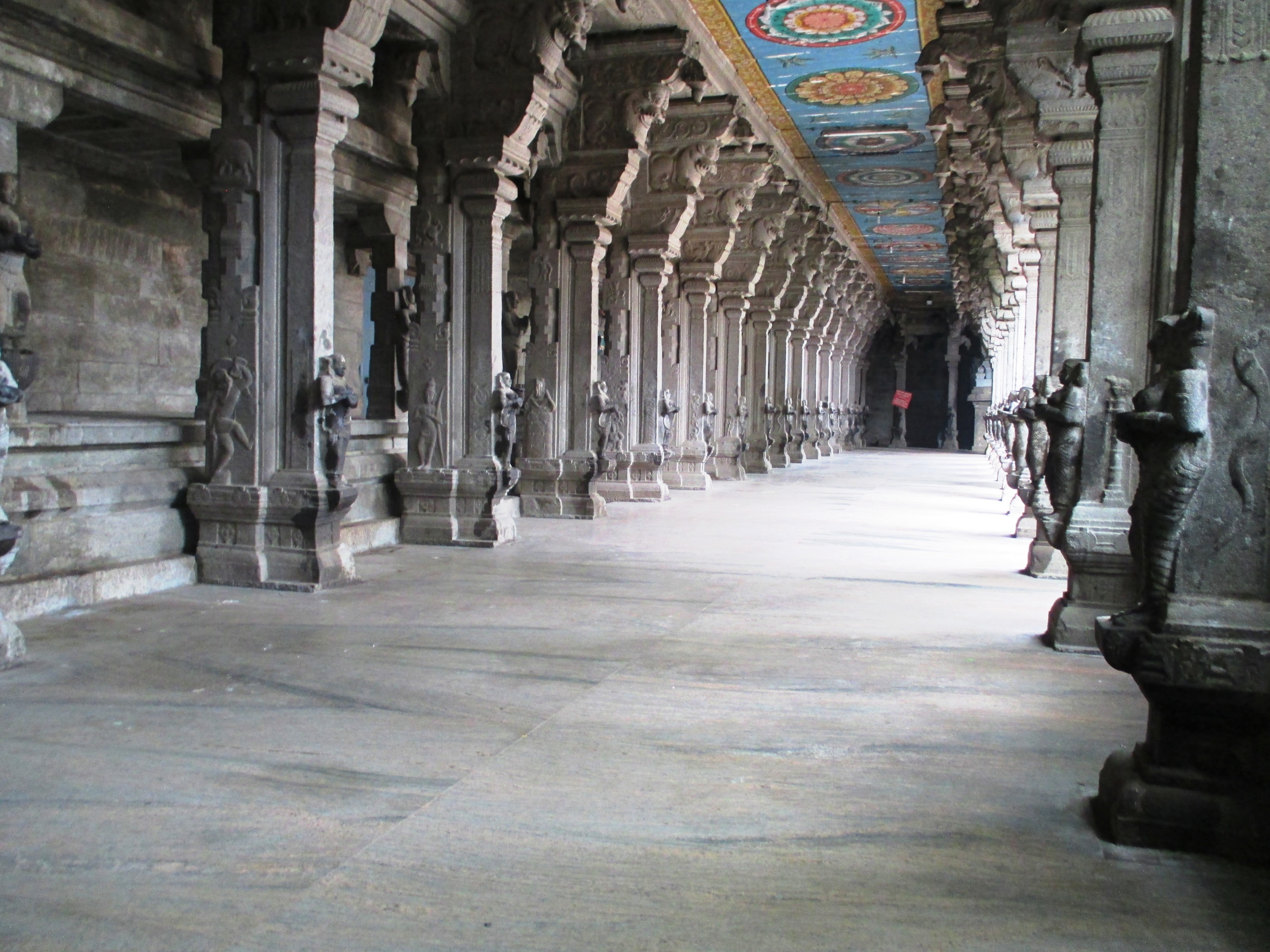
Pillared corridors in the temple

The place got the name of Suchindrum from the Sthala Purana. Hindu mythological legend has it that king of devas, Indra got relieved of a curse at the place of the main linga in the temple. The term "Suchi" in Suchindrum is believed to have derived from the Sanskrit meaning that stands for "purify". Accordingly, Indra is supposed to visit the temple for performing "Ardhajama Pooja", or worship, at midnight every day. As per another legend, sage Atri and his wife Anasuya stayed at Jnaranya. Sage Anasuya was highly devoted to her husband. The trinity of Hinduism, namely, Brahma, Vishnu and Shiva wanted to make her name eternal with their divine act. They came to the sage's hermitage as Brahmin mendicants. Anasuya treated them with utmost care. The Brahmins put forth a condition that they would accept her hospitality with a condition that she would come out nude. With her power of chastity, she converted the three to small kids and served them with her breast milk. Atri returned to the hermitage at the behest of Parvathi, Saraswathi and Lakshmi (the wives of the trinity) to restore their husbands to their original form. Anasuya obliged immediately and restored the kids to their original form. The trinity blessed the couple for their devotion. The three emanated in the form of three Lingas and the place where the couple worshiped the trinity is believed to be the temple.

== History ==
There are several inscriptions from the period of early and medieval Cholas along with other Pandya rulers and Chera rulers in the region. There are two records from Kopparakesarivarman who took Madurai and Eezham (Sri lanka) from the 30th and 40th regnal year of Parantaka I (907–950 CE).

The current temple was renovated by Madurai Nayak kings in the 17th century and is famous for its sculptures . It was previously administered and controlled by "Thekkumon Madam", a famous Namboothiri priest family. The main deity of the temple is Lord Shiva, Lord Vishnu and Lord Brahma in a single form called Sthanumalyam. This 17th-century temple is famous for its architectural grandeur. The seven-storey white gopuram (gateway tower) is visible from a distance. Its 44 m (144 ft) facade is covered with sculptures of Hindu deities. The Travancore Maharajas, under whose administration the temple remained till Kanyakumari's merger with Tamil Nadu, have made many endowments for its upkeep. During the reign of Ayilyam Thirunal Rama Varma Maharajah of Travancore, a lottery scheme was introduced in 1875 CE, to raise funds for rebuilding a portion of the temple and a sum of over Rs. 40,000 was realised.

== Architecture ==
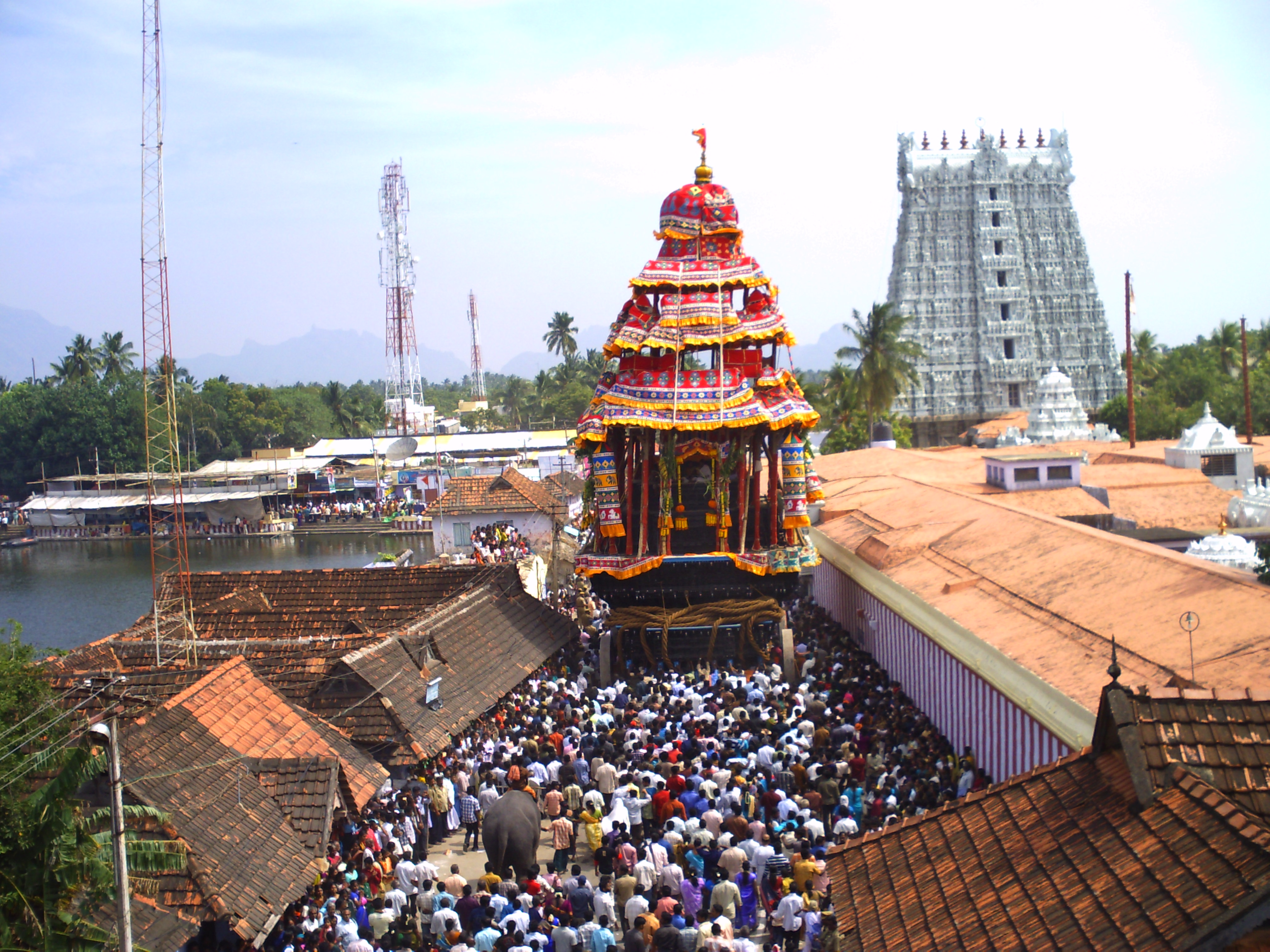
The Temple Chariot festival

The temple is one of the few temples in the Kanyakumari region in both Kerala style architecture and Tamil style architecture. The Navaratri Mandapam built during the 16th century has a typical wooden structure like Kerala temples. The temple is known for its quality of workmanship in stone. There are four musical pillars carved out of a single stone, and which stand at 18 feet (5.5 m) in height; these are an architectural and design highlight of the temple grounds. They are in the Alankara Mandapam area, and they emit the sounds of various musical notes when struck. There are an additional 1035 pillars with carvings in the area known as the dancing hall.

There is an Anjaneya (Hanuman) statue which stands at 22 feet (6.7 m) and is carved of a single granite block. It is one of the tallest statues of its type in India. It is also of historical interest that this statue was buried in the temple in 1740 and was subsequently forgotten. It was rediscovered in 1930, and subsequently restored for viewing by the then Devaswom Board Commissioner Rajya Seva Praveena Sri M.K. Neelankantha Iyer of Kottarathu Mathom, Moncompu. There is also a Nandi statue, made of mortar and lime, which is 13 feet (4.0 m) tall and 21 feet (6.4 m) long, it is one of the biggest Nandi statues in India. There are also various scenes from Ramayana and Mahabharatha depicted in various pillars in the temple.

== Religious significance ==
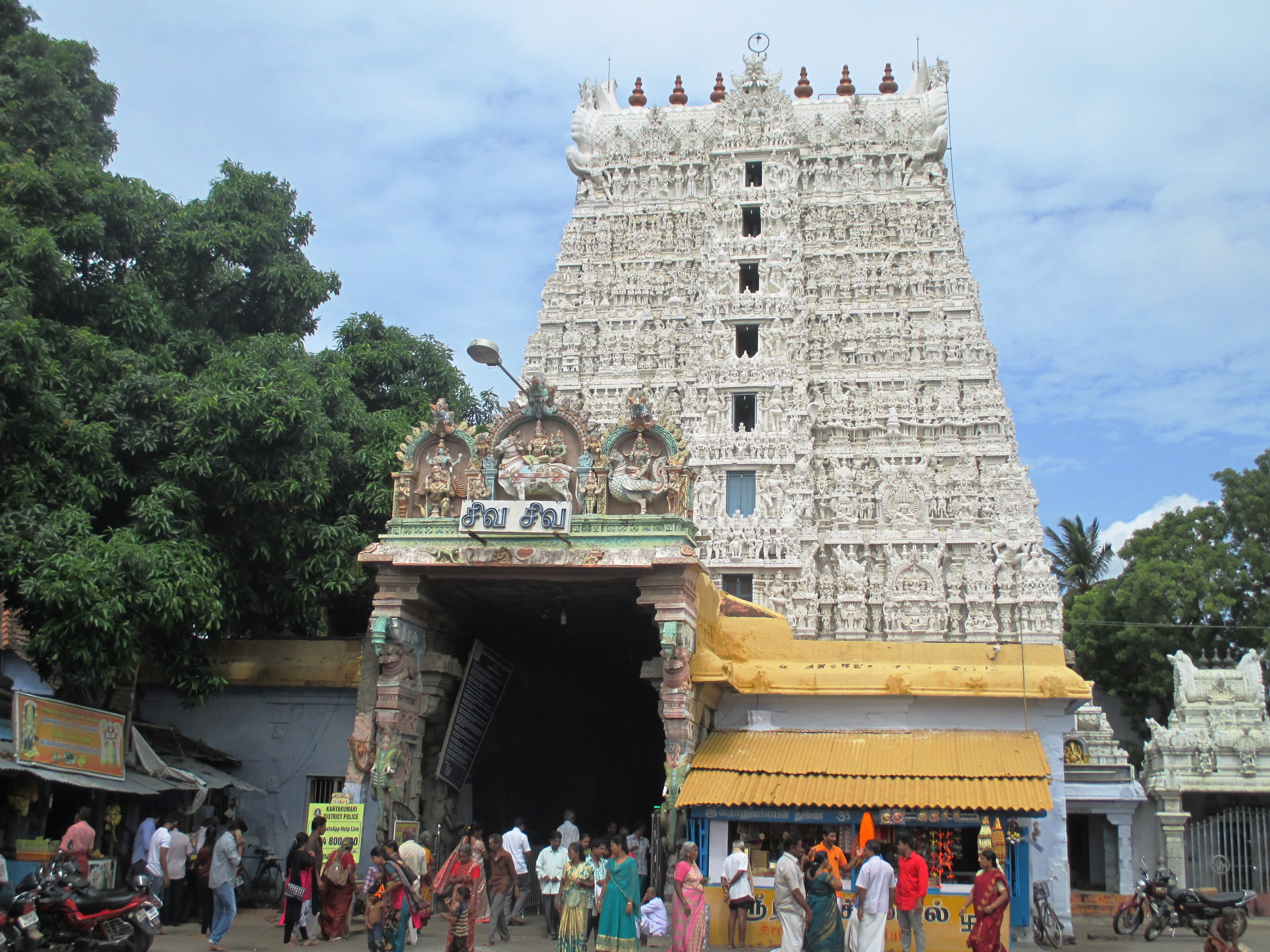
A view of the temple from outside

The religious significance of the temple stems from the fact that the main statue of linga represent Shiva (Sthanu), Vishnu (maal) and Brahma (Ayan) (as well as giving the temple its name). The representation of the three central gods of Hinduism in one linga makes it unique in India. The 10-day procession including the car festival in the last few days is celebrated in this temple between December and January, attracts crowds of thousands of people. Special worship practices are followed and the festival images of Sthanumalayan, Aram valartha Nayagi and Vinayagar are taken in the temple car around the streets of the temple. Another festival known as Teppam is celebrated during between April and May every year. The Sanskrit work Sucindrastalamahatmya gives a full-fledged legendary account of the origin and development of this temple.

== Administration ==
The temple is maintained and administered by the Hindu Religious and Charitable Endowments Department of the Government of Tamil Nadu.

== See also ==
- 108 Shiva Temples
