= V. C. Balakrishna Panicker =

Indian journalist and poet

Vellaatt Chembalancheri Balakrishna Panicker (1 March 1889 – 20 October 1912) was a journalist and poet who wrote several poems, slokas, plays, articles and translations, such as his elegy or lament Oru Vilapam and a description of nature Viswaroopam for which he is remembered. He was the author of Manki Geetha.

== Biography ==
V.C. Balakrishna Panicker was born on 1 March 1889 at Oorakam-Keezhmuri near Malappuram. He was born in a poor family but went to Mankavu Palace in Kozhikode, where he stayed for 4 years amongst other poets and authors.

He wrote a well-known editorial on 26 October 1910 against the externment of Swadeshabhimani Ramakrishna Pillai.

V.C. died of tuberculosis at the early age of 23 on 20 October 1912.
