= Suchindram =

- town
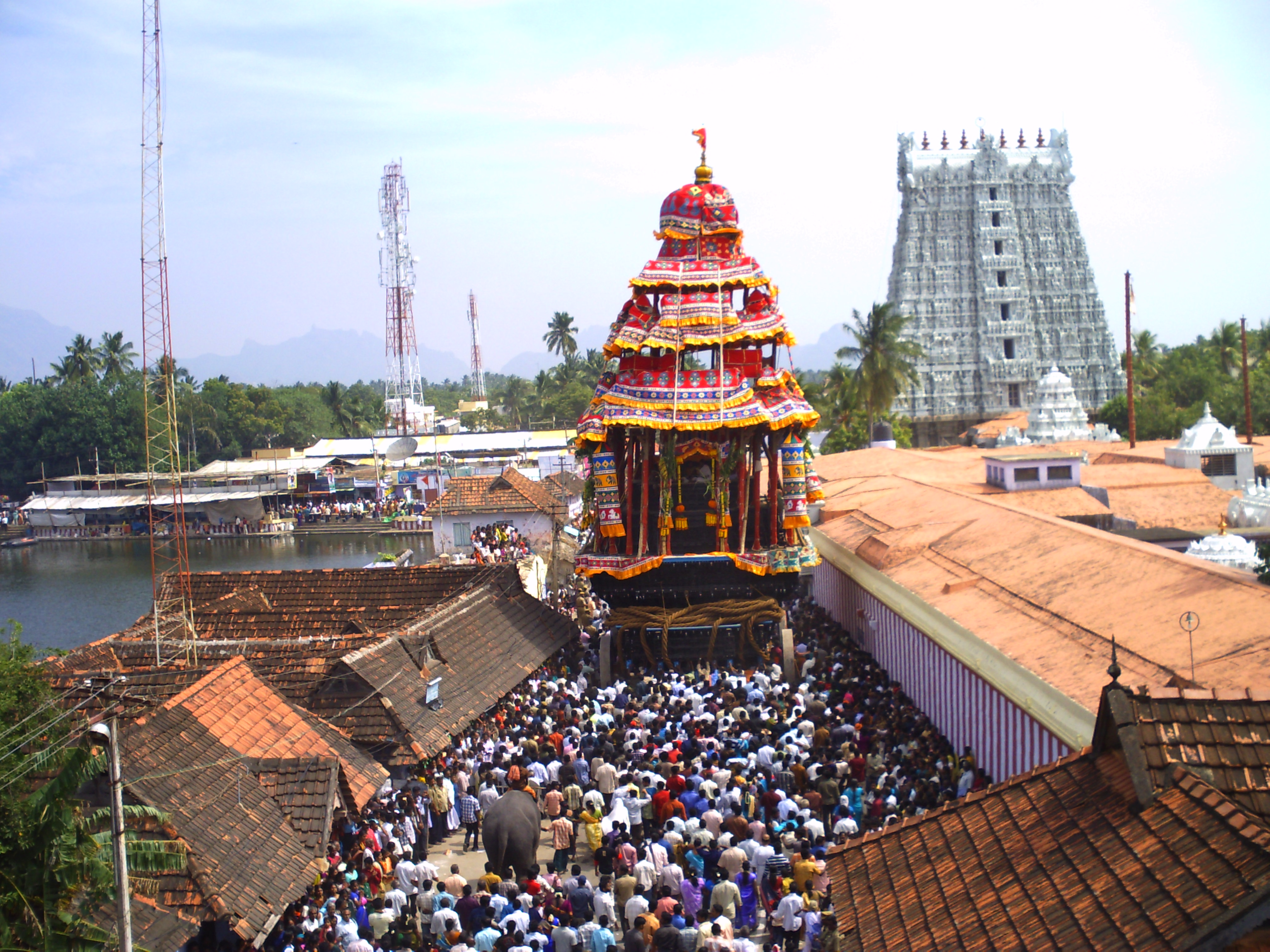
- Suchindram temple Chariot festival

- Suchindram, Tamil Nadu
- Coordinates: 8.159700°N 77.455800°E
- Country: India
- State: Tamil Nadu
- District: Kanniyakumari
- Elevation: 41 m (135 ft)

Population (2001)
  - Total: 11,953

Languages
  - Official: Tamil
- Time zone: UTC+5:30 (IST)
- PIN: 629704
- Telephone code: 04652
- Vehicle registration: TN-74
- Website: www.suchindram.com

Suchindram is a panchayat town in the Kanyakumari district in the Indian state of Tamil Nadu with the Indian postal code 629704. It is an important pilgrim centre and the site of the famous Thanumalayan Temple. There is an Anjaneya (or Hanuman) statue that stands at 22 feet (6.7 m) and is carved from a single granite block.

== Geography ==
Suchindram is located at Kanyakumari District. It has an average elevation of 19 metres (62 feet).

Suchindram is a temple town situated in the southernmost district of Kanyakumari in Tamil Nadu, India. It is 11 km from Kanyakumari city and 7 km from Nagarcoil town 105 km from adjacent Tirunelveli district and approximately 81 km from Thiruvananthapuram city. The town of Suchindrum is renowned for the Thanumalayan Temple and was an important citadel of Travancore.

== History ==
The town along with Kanyakumari was part of Travancore. It became part of Tamil Nadu in 1956.

== Transportation ==
Suchindram is about 11 km from Kanyakumari and about 7 km from Nagercoil lying between these two towns. Busses ply from Thirunelveli, Kanyakumari and Thiruvananthapuram. The nearest railway station is Nagercoil Junction railway station on the Thiruvananthapuram - Kanyakumari section of the Southern Railway.

Government of Kerala is operating KSRTC bus between Holy Places Haripad, Thiruvananthapuram, Nagercoil, Suchindram, Mylaudy, and Athankarai Pallivasal (Tirunelveli dist).

== Thanumalayan Temple ==
Suchindram Temple, also known as Thanumalayan Temple, is a Hindu temple dedicated to Shiva, Vishnu, and Brahma, who are represented together by a single image in the main sanctum. The name Thanumalayan derives from Sthanu (Shiva), Maal (Vishnu), and Ayan (Brahma). The temple complex is known for its centuries-old stone sculptures and traditional architecture.

The entrance tower to this temple is visible from a distance as it rises majestically for 134 feet. The face of the tower is covered with sculptures and statues from Hindu Scriptures. There is a covered area in front of the main entrance and the entrance itself is about 24 feet high with a beautifully carved door. There is only one corridor running along the outer wall of the temple with many shrines and mandapams scattered in the inner area. This temple attracts both Vaishnavites and Saivites in large numbers. About 30 shrines to various deities within the temple complex, the large Lingam in the sanctum, the idol of Vishnu in the adjacent shrine and a large idol of Hanuman at the Eastern end of the Northern corridor represent almost all the deities of the Hindu pantheon.

The temple has quite a few sculptures and art. In the 'Alankara mandapam' adjacent to the Northern corridor there are four large pillars each formed by a group of smaller pillars all carved from a single stone. Two of these large pillars have 33 smaller pillars and the other two 25 each. These are the famous musical pillars. Each of these smaller pillars produce a different musical note when tapped. Unfortunately these pillars are surrounded by iron grills to prevent vandalism.

Step out of the 'Alankara mandapam' and you come face to face with a gigantic figure of Hanuman. The figure is 18 feet high and depicts 'visuvaroopam'. There are other carvings and sculptures on every pillar and panel throughout the temple, which are a feast to the eye and the imagination.

== Festivals ==
There are two important festivals, one in Markazhi (December/January) and the other in Chiththirai (April/May). During the Markazhi festival, on the 9th day the deities are taken out in procession around the streets on three festival cars.

== Demographics ==
As of 2001 India census, Suchindram had a population of 11,953. Males constitute 49% of the population and females 51%. Suchindram has an average literacy rate of 86%, higher than the national average of 59.5%: male literacy is 89%, and female literacy is 84%. In Suchindram, 9% of the population is under 6 years of age.

== Neighborhoods ==
- Mylaudy
- Marungoor
- Nagercoil
- Nalloor
- Rajavoor
- Kumarapuram thoppur

== List of Schools ==
- Maharishi Vidya Mandir, South Car Street
- S.M.S.M. Higher Secondary School
- Government Primary School
- Government Middle School
- Arasu Thodakkappalli, Karkadu
- Dwarakai Krishnan Hindu Vidyalaya
- Isha Vidhya Matriculation Higher Secondary School, Theroor
- St. Teresa Matriculation Higher Secondary School

== Notable people ==
- T. N. Gopakumar
